= 2016–17 Formula E Championship =

Electric racing car championship

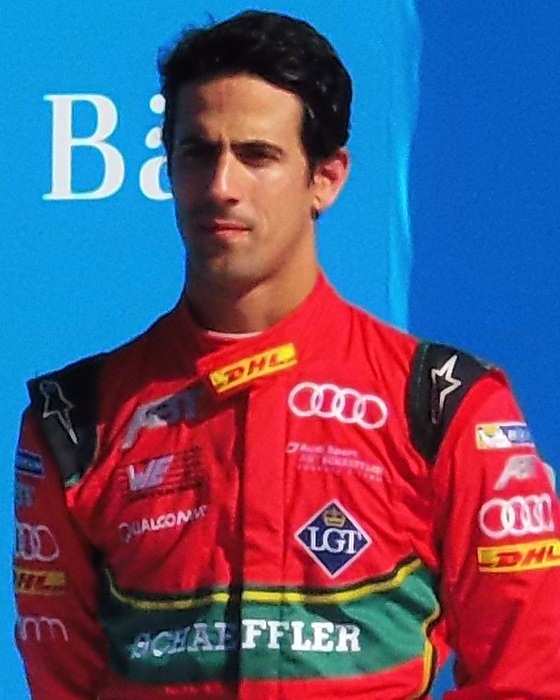
Lucas di Grassi won the Drivers' Championship.

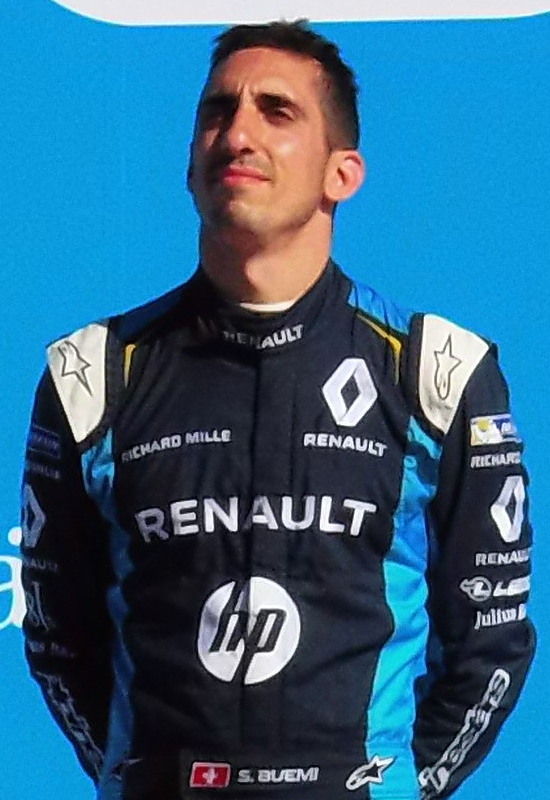
Sébastien Buemi finished second in the drivers standings, 24 points behind Lucas di Grassi.

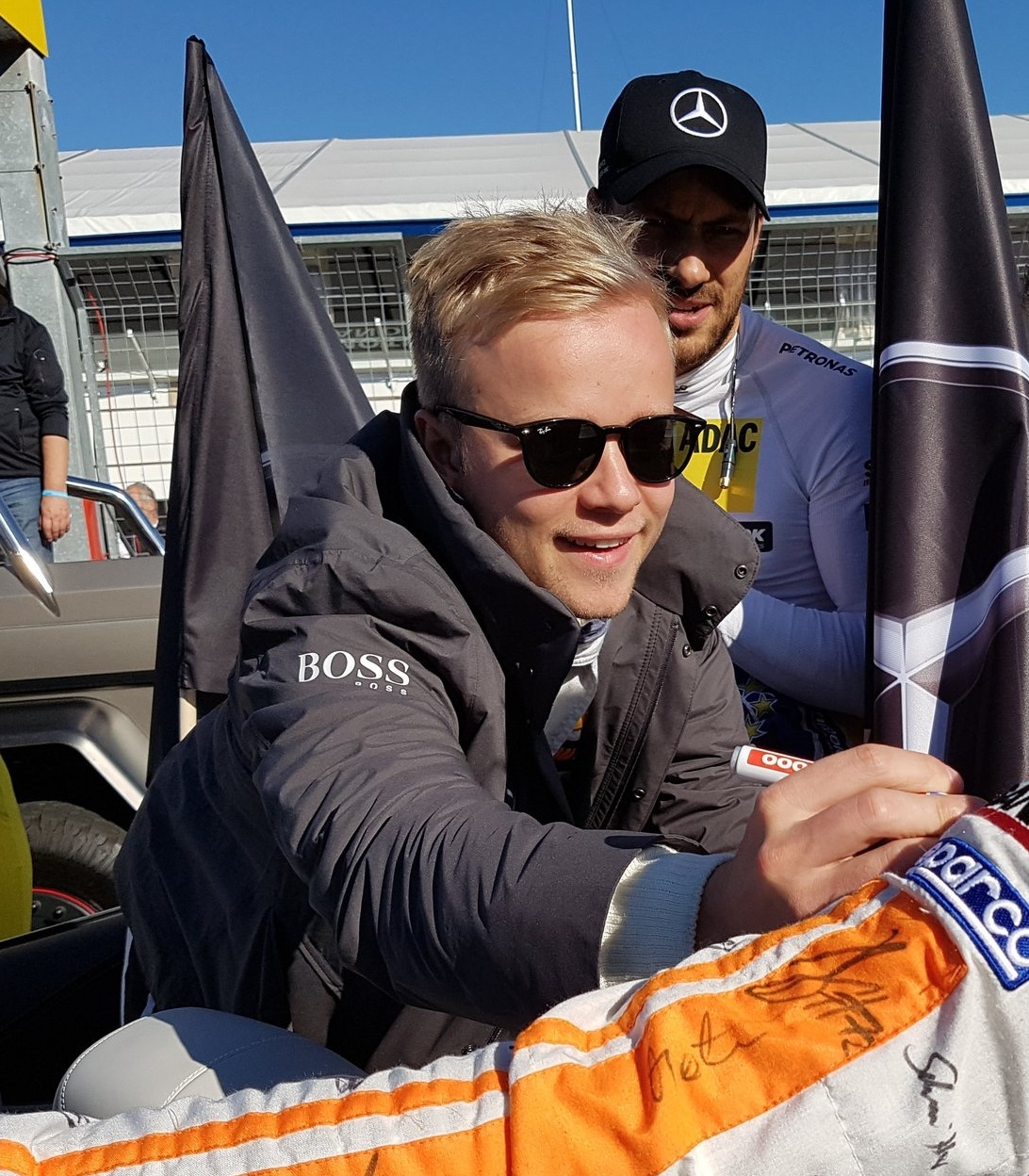
Felix Rosenqvist finished the championship in third place in his first season in Formula E.

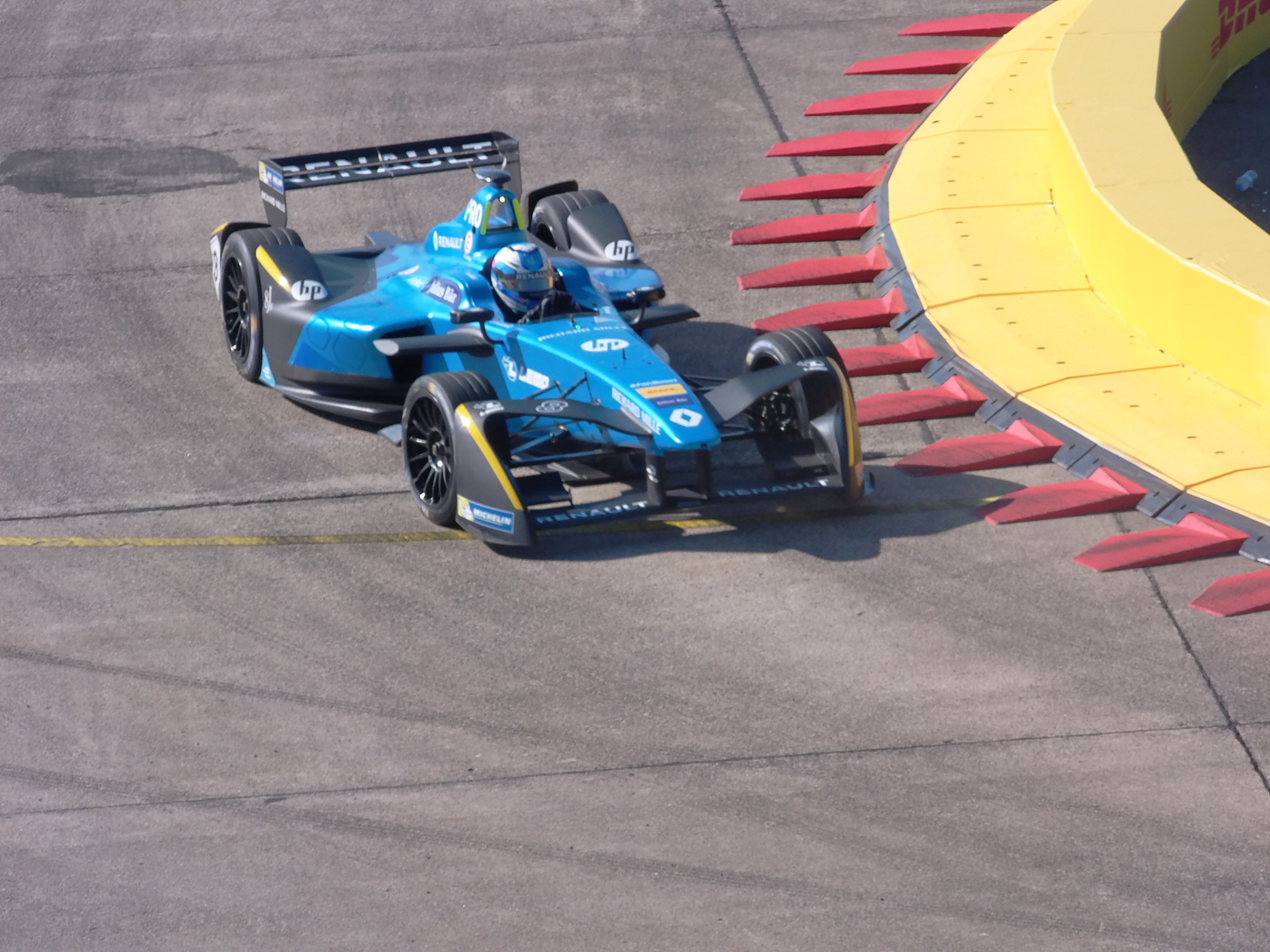
Renault e.dams won the Teams' Championship

The 2016–17 FIA Formula E Championship was the third season of Fédération Internationale de l'Automobile (FIA) Formula E (FE) motor racing. It featured the 2016–17 FIA FE Championship, a motor racing championship for open-wheel electric racing cars, recognised by FIA, the sport's governing body, as the highest class of competition for electrically powered vehicles. 25 drivers representing 10 teams contested 12 ePrix, starting in Hong Kong on 8 October 2016 and ending in Montreal on 30 July 2017 as they competed for the Drivers' and Teams' Championships.

The calendar featured eleven significant changes from the 2015–16 season. The first two were the introduction of the Hong Kong and Marrakesh races, with the latter taking the championship to its first African city. The third was the return of the Monaco ePrix, held for the first time since the 2014–15 season. The fourth was the Berlin ePrix returning to Tempelhof Airport after the event was held along the Karl-Marx-Allee in 2016. The fifth was the New York City ePrix double header, which brought motor racing back to the city for the first time since 1896. The sixth was FE's first visit to Canada for the season-closing Montreal ePrix. The final four changes saw the Long Beach and Punta del Este rounds discontinued due to financial issues, the London double header was cancelled because of opposition to it being held in a public park and the Beijing and Putrajaya were dropped for undisclosed reasons. There were two new teams: car manufacturer Jaguar returned to motor racing as a works team for the first time in 12 years, and Team Aguri was bought by public entity and venture capital firm China Media Capital and renamed Techeetah.

ABT Schaeffler Audi Sport driver Lucas di Grassi secured his first Drivers' Championship in the season-closing race in Montreal. The runner-up was defending champion Buemi, 24 points behind, after missing the New York City races because of a World Endurance Championship commitment at the Nürburgring. Rookie driver Felix Rosenqvist of Mahindra was third, another 30 points adrift. While neither of their drivers won the drivers' title, Renault e.Dams secured their third consecutive Teams' Championship, ahead of ABT Schaeffler Audi Sport and Mahindra.

== Teams and drivers ==
The following 10 teams and 25 drivers competed in the 2016–17 FIA Formula E Championship (FE): All teams used Spark chassis.

Teams and drivers competing in the 2016–17 Championship
Team	Powertrain	No.	Drivers	Rounds
(United Kingdom) DS Virgin Racing	DS Virgin DSV-02	2	(United Kingdom) Sam Bird	All
(United Kingdom) DS Virgin Racing	DS Virgin DSV-02	37	(Argentina) José María López	1–8, 11–12
(United Kingdom) DS Virgin Racing	DS Virgin DSV-02	37	(United Kingdom) Alex Lynn	9–10
(China) NEXTEV NIO	NEXTEV TCR Formula 002	3	(Brazil) Nelson Piquet Jr.	All
(China) NEXTEV NIO	NEXTEV TCR Formula 002	88	(United Kingdom) Oliver Turvey	All
(Monaco) Venturi Formula E Team	Venturi VM200-FE-02	4	(France) Stéphane Sarrazin	1–6
(Monaco) Venturi Formula E Team	Venturi VM200-FE-02	4	(France) Tom Dillmann	7–12
(Monaco) Venturi Formula E Team	Venturi VM200-FE-02	5	(Germany) Maro Engel	1–5, 7–12
(Monaco) Venturi Formula E Team	Venturi VM200-FE-02	5	(France) Tom Dillmann	6
(United States) Faraday Future Dragon Racing	Penske 701-EV (Note: It is a rebadged Mahindra M3Electro powertrain.)	6	(France) Loïc Duval	1–5, 7–12
(United States) Faraday Future Dragon Racing	Penske 701-EV	6	(United Kingdom) Mike Conway	6
(United States) Faraday Future Dragon Racing	Penske 701-EV	7	(Belgium) Jérôme d'Ambrosio	All
(France) Renault e.Dams	Renault Z.E 16	8	(France) Nico Prost	All
(France) Renault e.Dams	Renault Z.E 16	9	(Switzerland) Sébastien Buemi	1–8, 11–12
(France) Renault e.Dams	Renault Z.E 16	9	(France) Pierre Gasly	9–10
(Germany) ABT Schaeffler Audi Sport	ABT Schaeffler FE02	11	(Brazil) Lucas di Grassi	All
(Germany) ABT Schaeffler Audi Sport	ABT Schaeffler FE02	66	(Germany) Daniel Abt	All
(India) Mahindra Racing	Mahindra M3Electro	19	(Sweden) Felix Rosenqvist	All
(India) Mahindra Racing	Mahindra M3Electro	23	(Germany) Nick Heidfeld	All
(United Kingdom) Panasonic Jaguar Racing	Jaguar I-Type 1	20	(New Zealand) Mitch Evans	All
(United Kingdom) Panasonic Jaguar Racing	Jaguar I-Type 1	47	(United Kingdom) Adam Carroll	All
(China) Techeetah	Renault Z.E 16	25	(France) Jean-Éric Vergne	All
(China) Techeetah	Renault Z.E 16	33	(China) Ma Qinghua	1–3
(China) Techeetah	Renault Z.E 16	33	(Mexico) Esteban Gutiérrez	4–6
(China) Techeetah	Renault Z.E 16	33	(France) Stéphane Sarrazin	7–12
(United States) MS Amlin Andretti Formula E	Andretti ATEC-02	27	(Netherlands) Robin Frijns	All
(United States) MS Amlin Andretti Formula E	Andretti ATEC-02	28	(Portugal) António Félix da Costa	All

=== Team changes ===
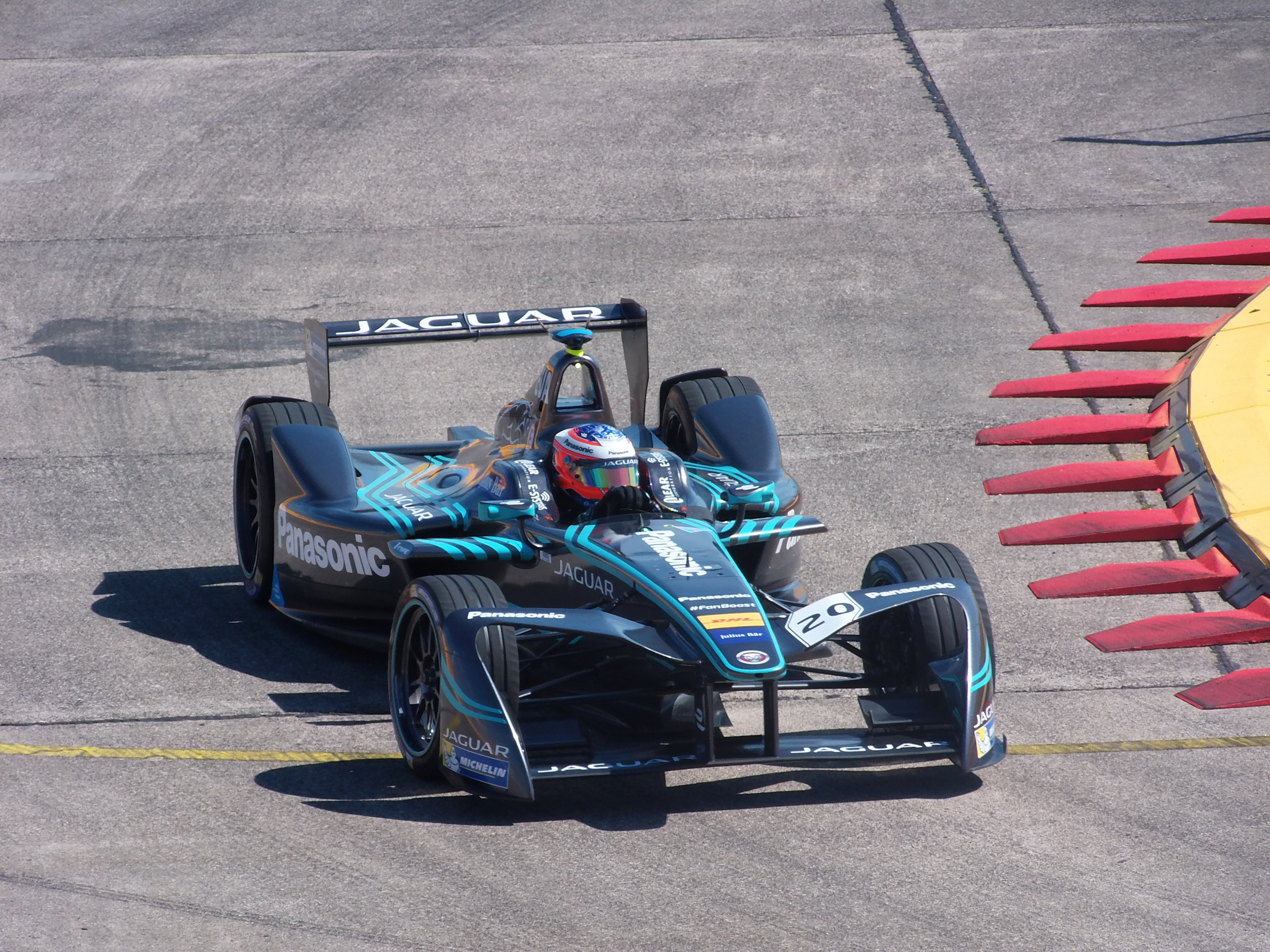
Jaguar returned to motor racing after a 12-year absence in collaboration with Williams Grand Prix Engineering.

Several team changes took place before the season began. Car manufacturer Jaguar announced their return to motor racing in December 2015 as a works team for the first time since its withdrawal from Formula One (F1) at the end of 2004. It entered the sport in collaboration with Williams Grand Prix Engineering, as a means of expanding their electric vehicle portfolio. Dragon Racing manufactured its own powertrain after using one supplied by Venturi in the previous season. It entered into a technical partnership with American start-up technology company Faraday Future in July 2016 for the next four seasons, with an option for a further four years after the current agreement expires.

Andretti announced a two-year technical partnership with BMW, enabling the German marque to familiarise itself with the series in view of a potential works team for the 2018–19 season. Team Aguri principal Aguri Suzuki announced he would leave the team in April 2016 as senior personnel entered "a period of consultation" over a future change in ownership. In the week before the 2016 London ePrix, the Chinese public equity and venture capital firm China Media Capital announced its purchase of Team Aguri and established a new entity named Techeetah in its place. Senior personnel from Team Aguri, including team principal Mark Preston, retained their jobs with Techeetah, and the cars ran a custom Renault powertrain.

=== Driver changes ===
==== Joining Formula E and changing teams ====
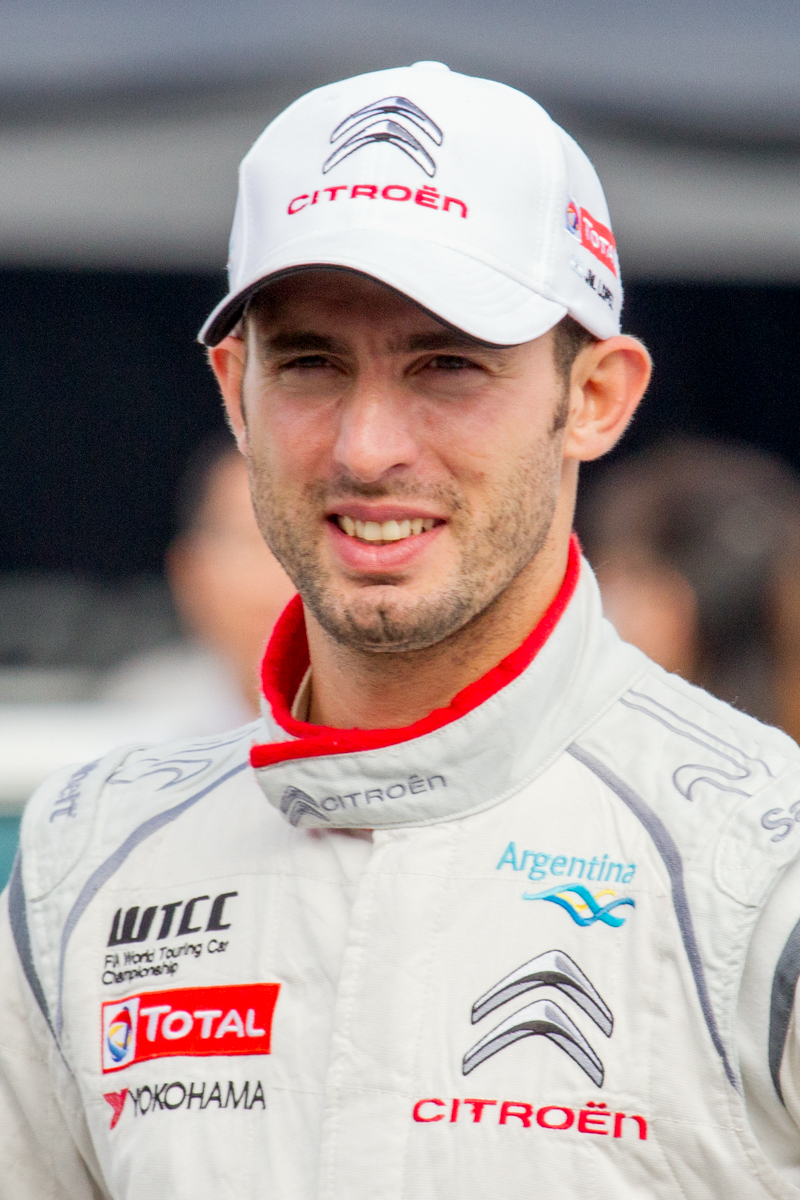
José María López joined the series with Virgin Racing, his first season in single-seaters since 2006.

2015 FIA Formula Three European Championship winner and two-time Macau Grand Prix victor Felix Rosenqvist joined the series with Mahindra to partner Nick Heidfeld, in lieu of Bruno Senna, who focused on the World Endurance Championship (WEC) in 2017. Defending FIA GT World Cup champion Maro Engel, who had not driven a single-seater car since the 2007 British Formula Three Championship, was hired by Venturi to replace WEC driver Mike Conway, who left FE to focus on endurance racing. Three-time World Touring Car champion José María López was employed by Virgin Racing to join its regular driver Sam Bird. López had previously driven in single-seater motor racing series such as the GP2 Series with Super Nova Racing, along with occasional testing for the Renault F1 team in 2006.

Jean-Éric Vergne's future at Virgin Racing was under review since February and it was later confirmed he had left the team on 4 July. He signed with the Techeetah team three days later, and was joined by Ma Qinghua, who drove in the 2015–16 season's final three rounds. António Félix da Costa, who spent the previous two seasons with Team Aguri, joined the Andretti team, replacing Simona de Silvestro who moved to Nissan Motorsport in the Australian Supercars Championship in 2017. Jaguar announced their drivers after the pre-season test session at Donington Park. Four drivers were evaluated: 2008–09 A1 Grand Prix champion Adam Carroll, GP2 Series drivers Mitch Evans and Alex Lynn, and European Le Mans Series competitor Harry Tincknell to determine who would suit their team. In September 2016, Jaguar nominated Carroll and Evans to drive for them with three-time FE starter Ho-Pin Tung their reserve driver.

===== Mid-season changes =====
The season saw five driver changes. The first was the former Haas F1 driver Esteban Gutiérrez entering FE in January 2017 having explored options with three teams before joining Techeetah. Gutiérrez replaced Ma who could not match teammate Vergne's form in the season's first three rounds; he remained at Techeetah as its third driver. Duval and Engel did not participate in the Paris ePrix because of a Deutsche Tourenwagen Masters (DTM) commitment at the Lausitzring and were replaced by Conway and Formula V8 3.5 Series champion Tom Dillmann respectively.

Heading into the Berlin race, Stephane Sarrazin—who had raced for Venturi since the championship started in 2014—was granted permission to leave the team and joined Techeetah to replace Gutiérrez, who deputised for the injured Dale Coyne Racing driver Sébastien Bourdais in the IndyCar Series. His position at Venturi was assumed by Dillmann for the rest of the season. Because the New York City ePrix clashed with the 6 Hours of Nürburgring, López and Sébastien Buemi were required to prioritise the WEC by Toyota and Lynn and 2016 GP2 Series champion and Super Formula driver Pierre Gasly replaced them.

== Season calendar ==
Schedule of events
Round	ePrix	Country	Track	Date
1	Hong Kong ePrix	Hong Kong	Hong Kong Central Harbourfront Circuit	9 October 2016
2	Marrakesh ePrix	Morocco	Circuit International Automobile Moulay El Hassan	12 November 2016
3	Buenos Aires ePrix	Argentina	Puerto Madero Street Circuit	18 February 2017
4	Mexico City ePrix	Mexico	Autódromo Hermanos Rodríguez	1 April 2017
5	Monaco ePrix	Monaco	Circuit de Monaco	13 May 2017
6	Paris ePrix	France	Paris Street Circuit	20 May 2017
7	Berlin ePrix Race 1	Germany	Tempelhof Airport Street Circuit	10 June 2017
8	Berlin ePrix Race 2	Germany	Tempelhof Airport Street Circuit	11 June 2017
9	New York City ePrix Race 1	United States	Brooklyn Street Circuit	15 July 2017
10	New York City ePrix Race 2	United States	Brooklyn Street Circuit	16 July 2017
11	Montreal ePrix Race 1	Canada	Montreal Street Circuit	29 July 2017
12	Montreal ePrix Race 2	Canada	Montreal Street Circuit	30 July 2017

=== Calendar changes ===
==== New and returning races ====
Formula E visited Marrakesh for the first time in the season, which marked the inaugural race on the African continent.

The idea for a Hong Kong race first arose in 2013 when a design team visited the city. It was intended for inclusion in the 2014–15 season before schedule negotiations and approval from local authorities, and motorsport's international governing body, the Fédération Internationale de l'Automobile (FIA), delayed its debut. In October 2015, the Hong Kong ePrix was announced by FE's CEO and founder Alejandro Agag at a press conference at the Central Harbour Front Event Space pending further review by the FIA. In February 2016, Stéphane Roux, the chief organiser of the World Touring Car Championship, announced to the local press that FE was "keen" to hold a race on the streets of Marrakesh in the "near future". Both races were confirmed in the final version of the calendar in a meeting of the FIA World Motor Sport Council in September 2016.

After being left out of the 2015–16 calendar because it takes the place of the Historic Grand Prix of Monaco every other year, the Monaco ePrix was reinstated for the 2016–17 season with a scheduled date of 13 May to start a three-round streak in Europe. It had been proposed that the principality hold a race following the cancellation of the Moscow ePrix the previous season; it did not proceed because of a lack of preparation time. In December 2016, Berlin city officials voted against the ePrix returning to the Karl-Marx-Allee, citing "unreasonable road closures and restrictions for residents and road users," prompting race organisers to find an alternative venue. Following consultation with city authorities, it was announced two months later that the Berlin ePrix would return to the venue that held the event's first edition in 2015, Templehof Airport, on a revised layout.

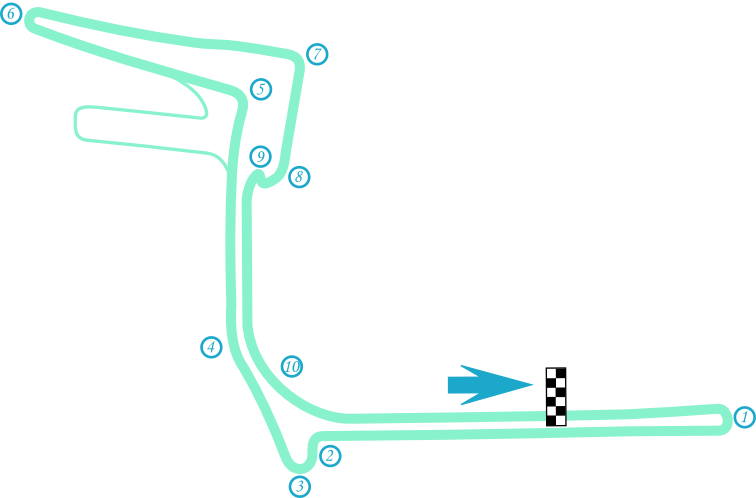
Formula E made its first appearance in New York City, the first motor race to be held in the city since 1896.

In March 2014, it was announced that FE was working with New York City authorities to bring a motor race to the area. Agag told CNN in May 2016 that he was "very optimistic" about the possibility of hosting an event in the city: "I've just come from New York looking at different venues, different possibilities. It's far from done yet but we are very optimistic. Our dream would be to have a race in New York." On 21 September 2016, officials announced that the New York City ePrix would be held on the 1.210-mile (1.947 km) long Brooklyn Street Circuit in the neighbourhood of Red Hook, Brooklyn. Montreal's Mayor Denis Coderre announced in September 2014 that he had entered into advanced discussions with FIA's President Jean Todt over holding a race in the city. After flying to Miami to meet with series officials six months later, Coderre said in May 2015 that "informal agreements" had been reached, and planning for the event commenced in January 2016.

==== Failed races ====
A planned race in Brussels was removed from the calendar after local government officials could not agree on a suitable location to hold the ePrix. It was initially agreed that the race be held in the Heysel/Heizel Plateau area north of the city, until the idea was dropped because finances for it were withdrawn and the Couleur Café music festival was relocated to the area. The series located a replacement venue 3 mi (4.8 km) south in Koekelberg; officials opposed this because of the disruption to early summer transport links. A venue was not found and the race was officially cancelled on 9 March, prompting the series to upgrade the Berlin ePrix to a double header.

The Long Beach round was discontinued because a financial agreement to continue hosting the event was not reached, and the Punta del Este ePrix was dropped from the calendar owing to similar consequences with the Uruguayan government. The London ePrix double header was cancelled after a local community group brought a High Court challenge against FE because it opposed the race being held in Battersea Park. The Beijing and Putrajaya races were discontinued for undisclosed reasons.

=== ePrix locations ===
Location of non-European ePrix in season 3.
(ePrix – single race)
(ePrix – double header)
Location of European ePrix in season 3.
(held ePrix)

== Rule changes ==
The start of the first practice session took place 15 minutes later to accommodate Roborace, the autonomous racing car series which held demonstration runs during the season. Unlike previous seasons, only one point was offered to the driver who recorded the fastest lap of a race to reduce the possibility that the championship would be decided by the additional award.

A 50% increase in the available regeneration progress from 100 kW (130 hp) to 150 kW (200 hp) was made possible by an evolution of the Williams Advanced Engineering-constructed battery, expanding the amount of possible strategies to drivers. The maximum amount of usable power during the race weekend remained at 200 kW (270 hp) for season three. It was planned to increase the maximum amount of permitted power to 220 kW (300 hp) in season four and 250 kW (340 hp) in season five following extensive battery performance and cost analysis. Battery cell weight was increased from 200 kg (440 lb) to 230 kg (510 lb) and the car's maximum weight fell from 888 kg (1,958 lb) to 880 kg (1,940 lb).

With regard to battery management, "power ramping down" was introduced whereby cars that exceeded their maximum power usage during the race were required to linearly ramp down to 0 kilowatts (0 hp) within five seconds on the track, and the car's rain light had to illuminate to alert other drivers. After the car crossed the line to mark the entry to pit lane, the driver had to engage the motor-generator unit to continue racing or return to the pit lane if this was unsuccessful. The change was introduced to aid spectators on energy usage rule transgressions without relying on a steward's decision.

For the new season, tyre supplier Michelin introduced an upgraded version of its 18 in (460 mm) all-weather tyre, which provided less rolling resistance, a weight reduction, and better energy management. The tyres were expected to gain optimum temperature faster and have the same high amount of longevity as the previous generation of tyres. The front wing mounted on all cars was redesigned for a more aggressive cosmetic appearance, and to give the series "a strong visual identity" to distinguish itself from other motor racing championships. Cars also ran with a redesigned steering wheel, which provided drivers with additional functionality options and provided them with the new strategic choices made possible by battery modifications. Starting from the Berlin ePrix, teams were required to display a driver's name and racing number on the car's external bodywork for improved visual identification for spectators.

== Race summaries ==
=== Pre-season ===
Two pre-season test sessions, held at Donington Park, were conducted on 23 to 25 August and 5 to 7 September 2016. The test sessions saw quick times laid down throughout, and marked the first usage of Michelin's new tyre compound in both dry and wet weather conditions. Reigning champion Sébastien Buemi and Jean-Éric Vergne were the two fastest overall drivers on the third day of running; 1.5 seconds covered the field in terms of outright pace on a circuit almost twice the length of a standard ePrix track.

=== Round 1 – Hong Kong ===
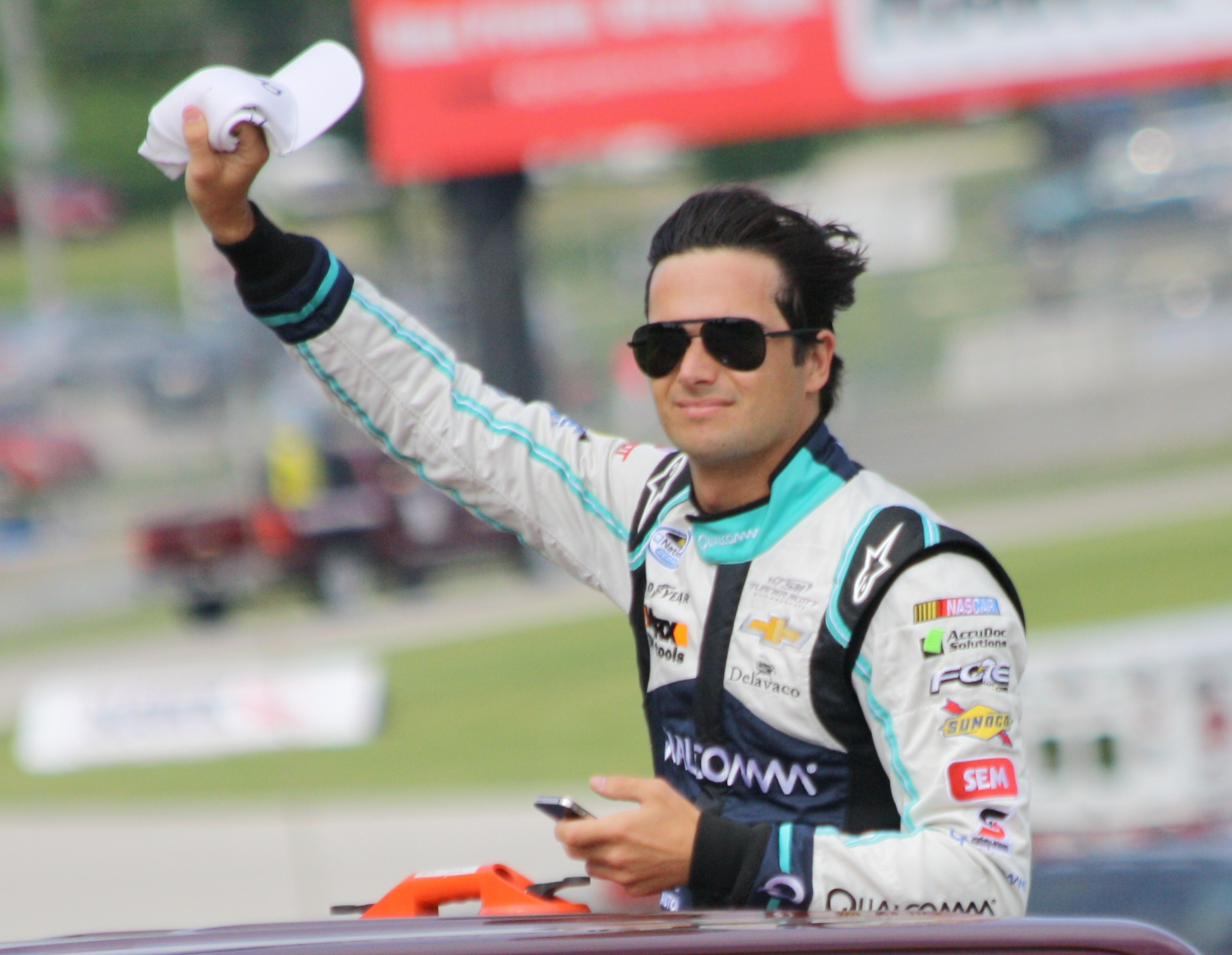
Nelson Piquet Jr. (pictured in 2013) took pole position for the Hong Kong ePrix and led until lap 17 before crashing.

The season opener in Hong Kong had its qualifying shortened due to multiple crashes causing several stoppages. The starting order was determined by the fastest drivers in the four qualifying groups. Nelson Piquet Jr. earned the first pole position of his career ahead of his teammate Oliver Turvey in second. He took an early lead from Turvey as the field was bottle-necked by contact in turns one and two. Di Grassi was caught off guard by Ma braking, and rammed into his car, removing the right-front section of his nose cone. While Piquet pulled clear from the rest of the field, di Grassi was required to enter the pit lane for a replacement front wing and made his stop on the eighth lap.

Bird had risen to second after passing Turvey two laps previously; he took the lead from Piquet when the latter reacted late to López's stricken car at the complex composing turns three and four on lap 17, and crashed into a barrier. Piquet resumed by selecting reverse gear and emerged without damage to his car. The safety car was deployed to enable the extrication of López's car from the track and for marshals to repair the barrier. Some drivers elected to switch into their second cars at the end of the 20th lap. Having chosen not to make a pit stop, Bird led for five laps until a problematic pit stop lost him positions, and elevated Buemi to first place and di Grassi second. Buemi was unchallenged for the rest of the race en route to his first victory of the season and the seventh of his career.

=== Round 2 – Marrakesh ===
In the first FE race on the African continent, Rosenqvist earned his maiden career pole position in his second race start and Mahindra's first. Buemi, who took second, was demoted five places on the starting grid because of an underweight fire extinguisher that was emptied by a possible leak. Rosenqvist took an early lead with a brisk getaway off the line. Shortly after, an information display error on his steering wheel's dashboard limited the information available to him. Rosenqvist had opened a five-second advantage over Bird; Vergne caught Rosenqvist by more than four-tenths of a second per lap. Albeit with less electrical energy, Vergne caught and overtook Bird for second on the 16th lap. On the same lap, the pit stops for the mandatory car change began when Rosenqvist and Vergne entered the pit lane, promoting Bird and Buemi to first and second. Buemi was faster than Bird and passed him on the following lap before both drivers made their pit stops.

After the pit stops, Rosenqvist retook first place and retained most of his four-second advantage over Vergne. The latter incurred a drive-through penalty for speeding in the pit lane and took it on lap 23, ending his chances of winning. Because he made a pit stop one lap earlier than the rest of the field, Rosenqvist slowed to conserve electrical energy, allowing Buemi to draw closer at the rate of two seconds per lap with FanBoost aid. Buemi slipstreamed Rosenqvist and braked later than him to gain the lead on the 29th lap. Rosenqvist struggled with his energy usage, and his slower pace allowed Bird to pass him for second with two laps to go. While Rosenqvist focused on preserving electrical energy, Buemi took his second consecutive win, and the eighth of his career.

=== Round 3 – Buenos Aires ===
The championship resumed four months later in Buenos Aires. It was announced in November 2016 that the Buenos Aires race would be the last to be held at the Puerto Madero Street Circuit due to redevelopment in the Puerto Madero area. For the third consecutive race, the pole sitter secured his maiden first position start. This time di Grassi secured the accolade by nearly-two-tenths of a second over Vergne. Di Grassi kept the lead at the beginning of the event, and Vergne held off Buemi for second place. Carroll remained stationary at his grid slot on the opening lap; he was able to start his car and racing resumed on the next lap. Vergne immediately began challenging for first and overtook di Grassi at turn four on the third lap to move into the lead.

Buemi passed di Grassi three turns later to claim second place while Vergne established a small lead over Buemi. Buemi got a better exit leaving the final corner and out-braked Vergne for the lead three laps further on. Di Grassi struggled with his car's handling, enabling Turvey to pass him for third, and he was put under pressure by the other e.Dams car of Prost. The pit stop phase began on lap 18 and when it ended Buemi regained the lead. Six laps later, di Grassi returned to third by capitalising on a driving mistake by Prost. Di Grassi pushed hard in an attempt to close up to Vergne; the latter responded by stabilising the time deficit to two seconds. Buemi had braking difficulties with his second car rendered him unable to brake in a straight line, and won his third race of the season and the ninth of his career. He also became the first driver in FE to win three consecutive ePrix.

=== Round 4 – Mexico City ===
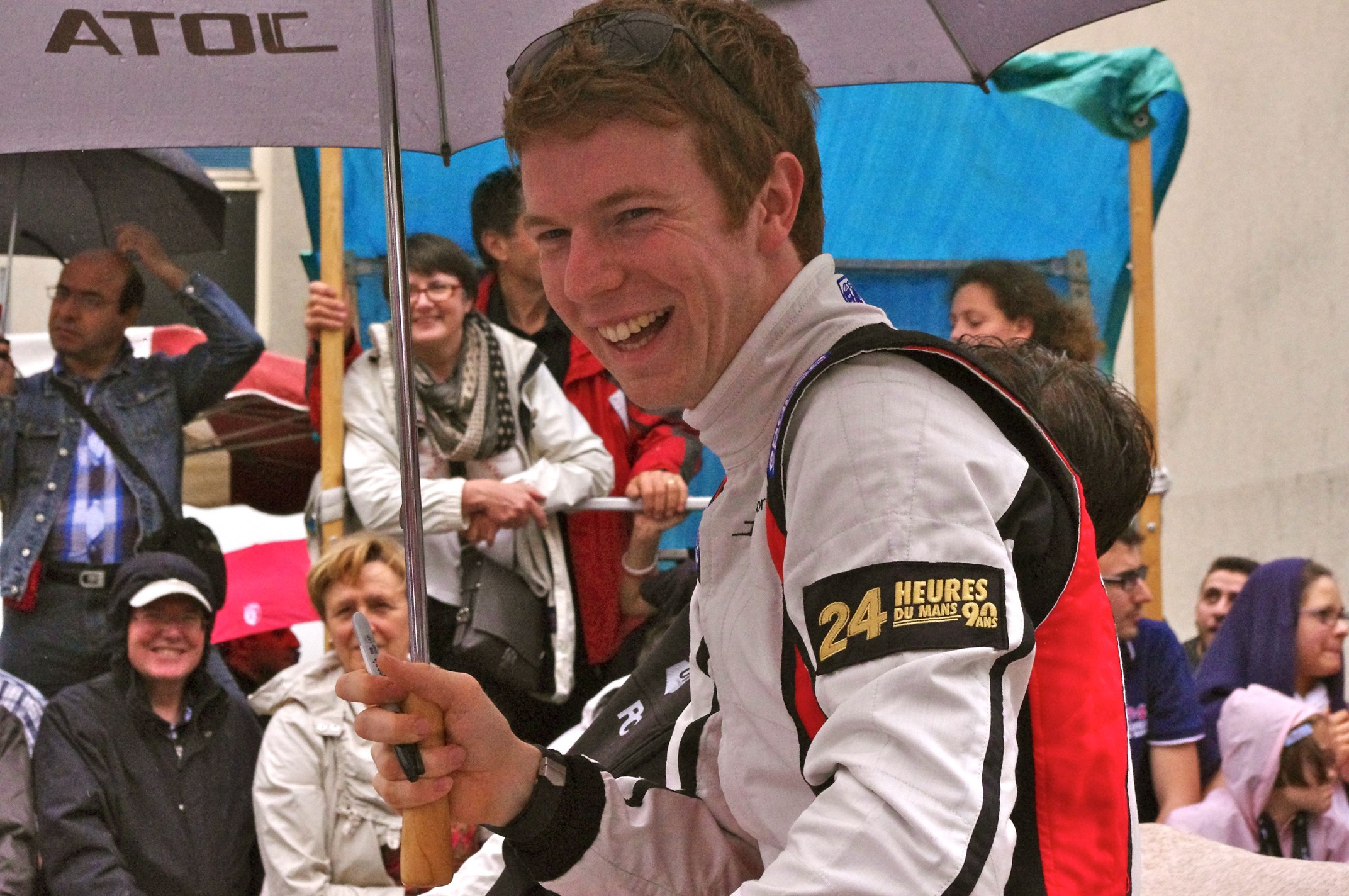
Oliver Turvey (pictured in 2013) took his maiden pole position in Mexico City and led laps before retiring with power problems.

Prior to the race, Techeetah announced that former Haas F1 driver Esteban Gutiérrez would replace Ma Qinghua in the team's second car. For the only time in the season, the fastest driver in qualifying did not start from pole position. Daniel Abt set the fastest time; a hefty grid penalty for tyre pressures that were below the minimum of 1.60-bar (160 kPa) left him 18th overall. Second-place qualifier Maro Engel was demoted ten places because of a gearbox change. This promoted Turvey to his first career pole position. He retained his startline advantage on the first lap. As the field concertinaed through turns three and five, Engel hit di Grassi's car and damaged his rear wing. Di Grassi made an unscheduled pit stop for a replacement rear wing. The safety car was deployed on the second lap for marshals to clear debris and di Grassi avoided going a lap behind the leaders. Turvey kept the lead at the restart three laps later. López followed Turvey until the latter retired with power issues, promoting López to first place, and necessitating the safety car's second appearance.

With the field closed up, di Grassi and Jérôme d'Ambrosio opted to make the mandatory switch to their second cars on the 18th lap. The change enabled the duo to gain positions when other drivers made their stops; it required them to conserve electrical energy towards the end of the race's. Di Grassi and d'Ambrosio moved into first and second places after the field entered into their second cars between laps 24 and 26. The safety car was deployed after Loïc Duval retired with a battery issue. The safety car was withdrawn on lap 30 and di Grassi held the lead and conserved his electrical energy usage enough to make the finish, securing his first victory of the season and the fifth of his career. Elsewhere in an action-packed race, Buemi finished 14th after spinning attempting to overtake Rosenqvist, and earned one point for setting the fastest lap. Di Grassi's victory brought with it twenty-five points and put him five points behind Buemi in the championship contest.

=== Round 5 – Monaco ===
The European leg of the season commenced in Monaco. The fifth consecutive driver to clinch pole position in the season came to fruition when Buemi recorded the fastest time in qualifying. He took an early lead with second-place starter di Grassi close behind. Buemi established a small advantage of one second over di Grassi. On the eighth lap, Bird drove over the kerbing at Tabac corner and damaged his suspension in an impact with a barrier. He was shown a black flag with an orange disc, requiring him to enter the pit lane for car repairs. His teammate López was mandated to do the same after officials noted damage to his rear wing. Both drivers began a battle to set the race's fastest lap. Piquet could not remain with the leaders and Vergne closed up to him. Vergne steered right onto the inside line on lap 21. As the two locked their tyres, Piquet clambered with his steering wheel, and the two made contact. Vergne's race ended prematurely at the wall, and Piquet continued driving. The safety car was deployed to enable Vergne's car to be extricated from the track, and drivers made pit stops for the compulsory switch into their second vehicles.

Buemi led the field at the lap-26 restart, followed by di Grassi and Nick Heidfeld. After one lap under racing speeds, Buemi again pulled clear from di Grassi to establish a one-second advantage over him. Buemi attempted to level out the electrical energy difference between himself and di Grassi by conserving energy and used his FanBoost to keep the lead. Di Grassi narrowed the gap to Buemi—who had less electrical energy available—to half a second with six laps to go. While pondering an overtake on Buemi, slower traffic delayed the two, causing di Grassi to drop back. Di Grassi was also awarded FanBoost; he could not use it because of battery voltage limitations. He drew closer to Buemi on the final lap and forced the latter to defend his position, as he could not find the space to get ahead as the run to the start/finish line was not long enough. It allowed Buemi to repel di Grassi, for his fourth win of the season, and the tenth of his career.

=== Round 6 – Paris ===
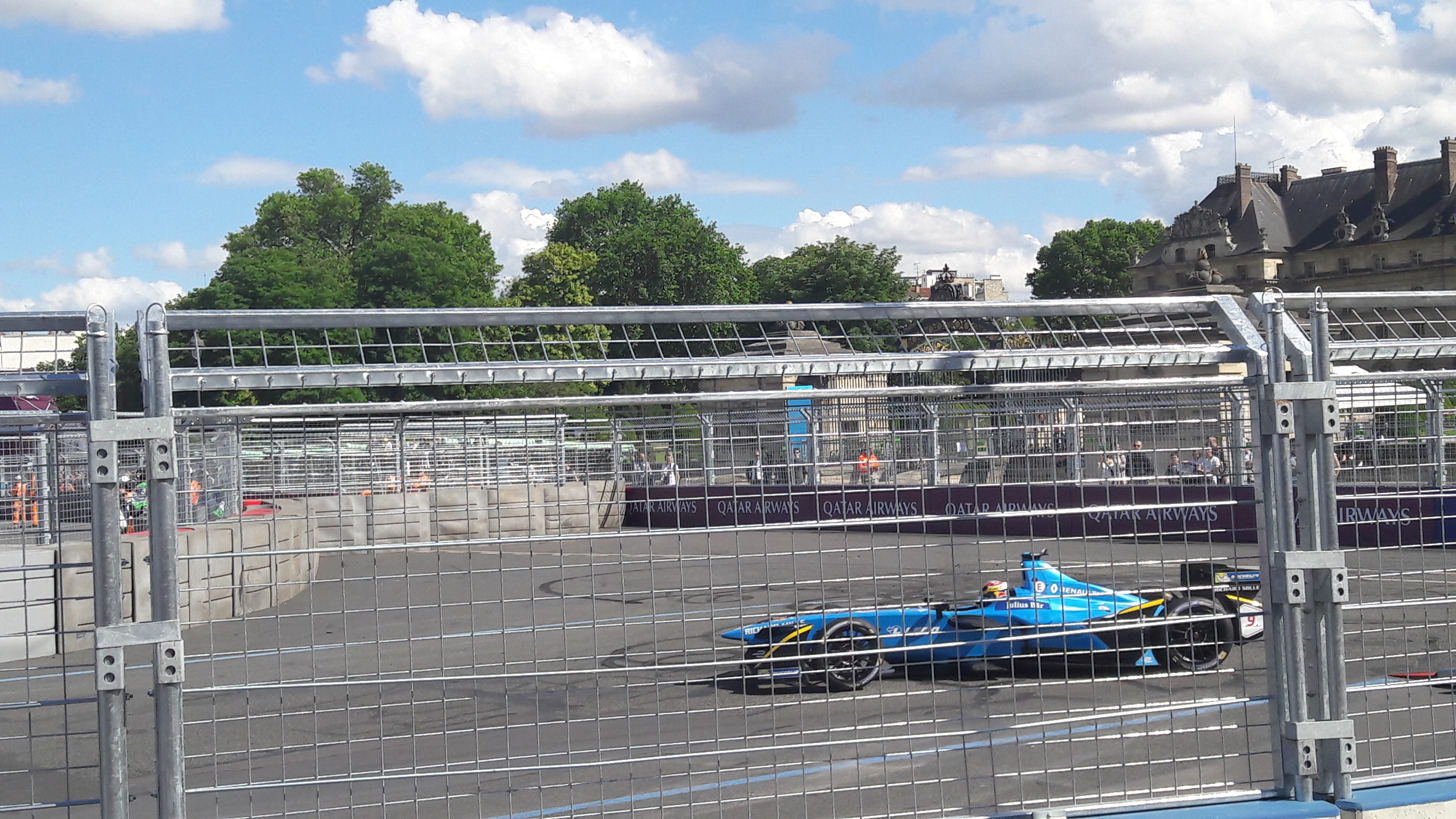
Sébastien Buemi won his fifth victory of the season in Paris to extend his Drivers' Championship advantage to a season-high of 43 points.

Duval and Engel missed the Paris ePrix because of a DTM commitment at the Lausitzring and were replaced by Toyota WEC driver Mike Conway and Formula V8 3.5 Series champion Tom Dillmann. In qualifying Buemi became the first driver to achieve his second pole position of the season. Buemi blocked an overtake by Vergne to maintain the lead at the start. After the first lap passed without incident, the field established themselves and the first on-track battles commenced. Upfront, Buemi led Vergne by one second as Gutiérrez lost positions because he was slower than the leaders. After passing Dillmann, Antonio Félix da Costa gained on di Grassi and overtook him; di Grassi remained close behind Félix da Costa.

Di Grassi attempted to pass Félix da Costa on lap 16. He moved in front, as both cars made contact, causing them to spear into the wall. The stewards investigated the collision and took no action against di Grassi. The incident prompted the activation of the full course yellow procedure. Most drivers, including Buemi, clambered into their second cars. Conway led for three laps before making his own stop. Vergne drew closer to Buemi on lap 34. He suspected a defective mechanical arm loosening his steering. He ran wide leaving turn 13, damaging his vehicle's front-right corner in a collision with a barrier, ending his race. Vergne's stricken car necessitated the safety car's deployment, and racing resumed four laps later with Buemi closely followed by López and Heidfeld. With two laps remaining, di Grassi locked his tyres and crashed into the wall, prompting the race to end behind the safety car for the second consecutive year. This enabled Buemi to take his fifth victory of the season and the 11th of his career. The result gave Buemi a season-high Drivers' Championship lead of 43 points.

=== Rounds 7 and 8 – Berlin ===
==== First race ====
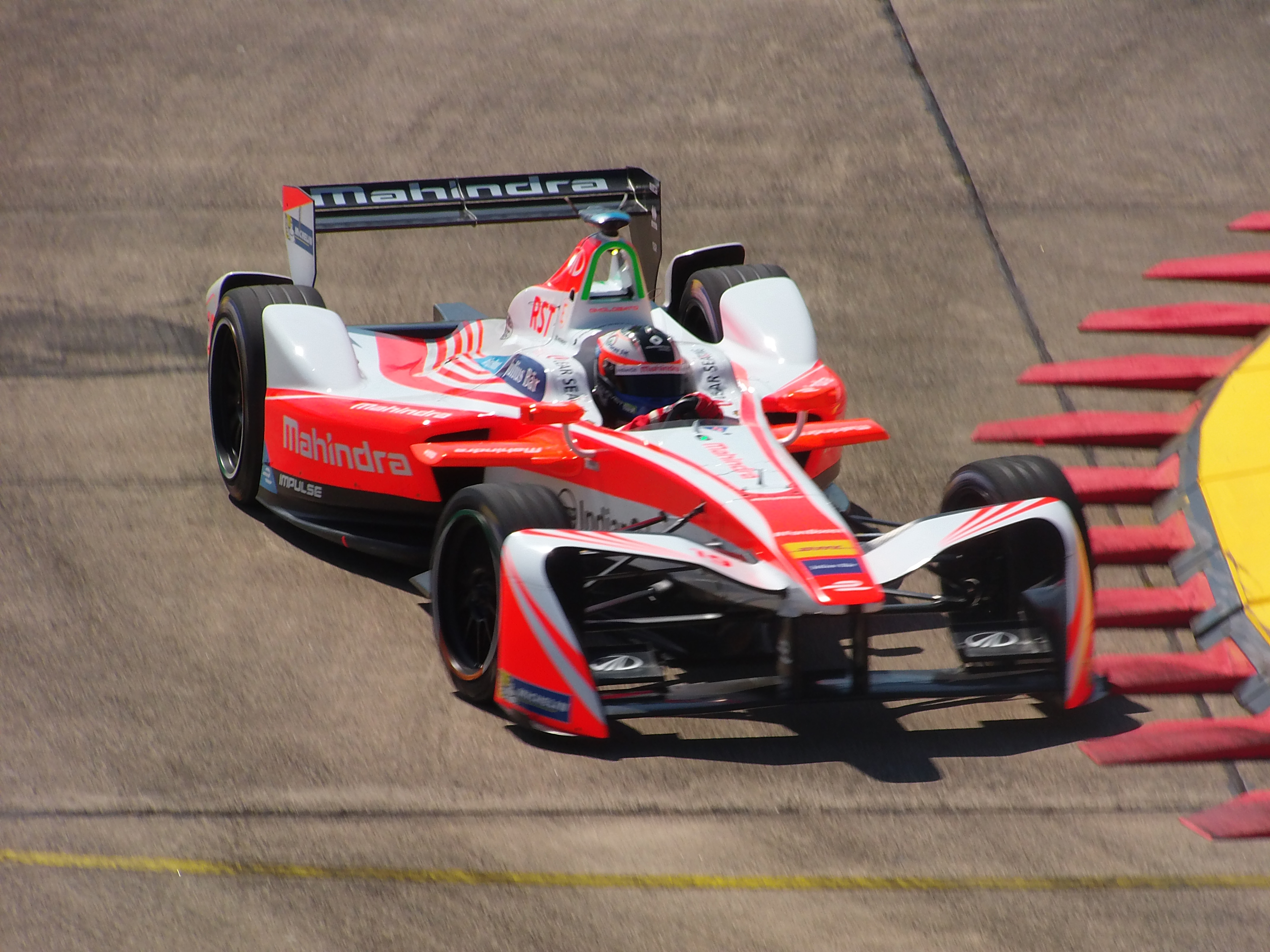
Rosenqvist secured his first career victory in the first Berlin ePrix. He was penalised for an unsafe pit stop release in the second race.

One week before the first Berlin ePrix, two more driver changes occurred when Gutiérrez left Techeetah to deputise for the injured Dale Coyne Racing driver Sébastien Bourdais in the IndyCar Series. Stéphane Sarrazin took his seat with Dillmann driving the second Venturi car. Di Grassi—nursing an ankle injury he sustained in a charity football match four days prior to the first race— took his second pole position of the season with the closest margin in FE history, 0.001 seconds over López. Di Grassi took an early lead, as a slow getaway from López meant the Mahindras of Heidfeld and Rosenqvist passed him. By the start of lap five, di Grassi led Rosenqvist by 1.2 seconds and the latter required extra electrical energy to attack in the race's closing stages.

Entering the pit stop phase, Rosenqvist reduced di Grassi's lead to three-tenths of a second, and took the lead from the electrical energy conservative di Grassi on lap 22. After every driver switched into a second car, Rosenqvist remained the leader with di Grassi in second and holding back on using his FanBoost for an attack on him. Heidfeld began to close up on di Grassi. Rosenqvist opened up a two-second advantage over the slower di Grassi and the latter activated his FanBoost to defend from the closing Heidfeld. Rosenqvist led the rest of the race to achieve his (and Mahindra's) first FE victory. Elsewhere, Buemi recovered from a sub-par qualifying performance to finish fifth on the road. He was later disqualified because all four tyres on both his cars were below the minimum mandated pressure of 1.60-bar (160 kPa).

==== Second race ====
Rosenqvist carried over his strong form into the second race with his second career pole position by nearly one-tenth of a second over Buemi. He maintained his pole position advantage on the first lap and opened up a two-second lead over Buemi. At this early stage of the race, Rosenqvist was instructed over the radio to preserve electrical energy by lifting and coasting. His teammate Heidfeld— who qualified 20th (and last) because a throttle sensor malfunction prevented him from recording a maximum power lap— caught Mitch Evans's Jaguar and challenged him for the final points-scoring position of tenth by the 13th lap. Upfront, Rosenqvist and Buemi pulled away from López and both were separated by a second. López was challenged by teammate Bird for third; the latter had difficulty overtaking until Bird executed a failed overtake four laps later that resulted in contact. Bird fell to seventh behind Vergne, di Grassi and Abt.

At this stage, Buemi was 1.3 seconds adrift of Rosenqvist; the latter was aware of the situation and glanced at his rear-view mirrors to ensure his advantage was large enough to remain ahead after the pit stops. The mandatory pit stop phase for the switch into a second car began on lap 23 when the leaders entered the pit lane. After exiting his team's garage, Rosenqvist was released into teammate Heidfeld's path, causing the latter to swerve and nearly enter another team's pit lane gantry. Even after the delay, Rosenqvist remained the leader. He was immediately investigated by the stewards, and built up a steady advantage over Buemi as he was aware of the possible implications of his pit stop release. After reviewing Rosenqvist's pit stop release, he was imposed a ten-second post-race time penalty. Rosenqvist crossed the start/finish line after 46 laps to finish first on the road, 2.9 seconds ahead of Buemi. With the application of Rosenqvist's penalty, Buemi was declared the winner, his sixth of the season and the 12th of his career.

=== Rounds 9 and 10 – New York City ===
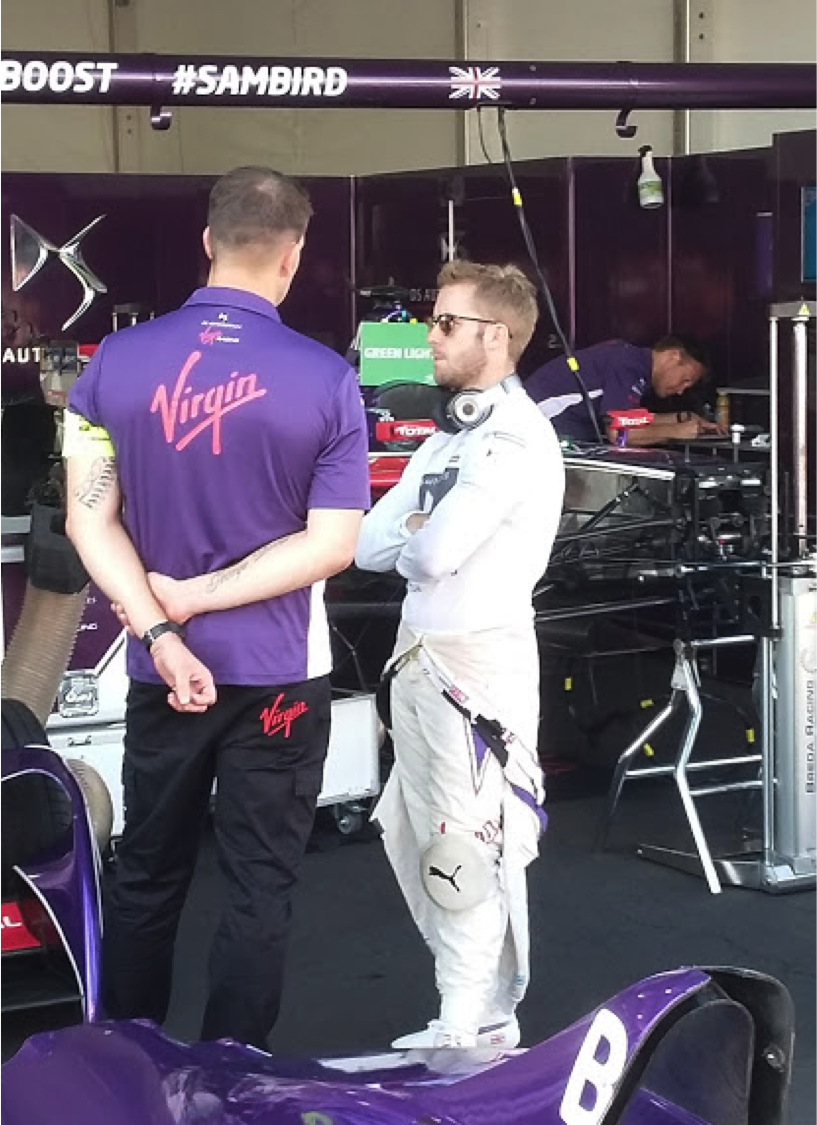
Sam Bird, pictured (right), won both New York City races.

==== First race ====
Buemi and López missed the New York City ePrix since the race clashed with the 6 Hours of Nürburgring. They were replaced by 2016 GP2 Series champion and Super Formula driver Pierre Gasly and GP2 Series driver Alex Lynn. In the first motor race held in New York City since 1896, Lynn clinched pole position in his maiden ePrix ahead of Abt. Wheelspin from Lynn at the start promoted Abt to first place. He could not pull away from the field because he conserved electrical energy. Bird grew frustrated with teammate Lynn defending and was later granted permission to overtake him for second on lap nine and quickly challenged Abt for the lead. Meanwhile, Abt had brake trouble and his team requested he focus on restoring electrical energy. Bird used this handicap to his advantage, and after twice failing to pass him, overtook Abt for the lead on lap 16. Electrical energy management issues swiftly demoted Lynn from second to fifth by lap 17. By this point, Heidfeld attacked Abt, as Vergne drew closer to him; both demoted Abt to fourth.

Abt regained the lead temporarily for one lap when the field made pit stops. Bird later reclaimed the position with Vergne second. Swift work from Sarrazin's crew enabled him to gain the most places and move into fourth while Heidfeld fell to eighth. Di Grassi drove cautiously in his attempt to find space for a pass on Rosenqvist. He passed Rosenqvist when the latter spun into a barrier on lap 33 and was required by officials to make a pit stop for car repairs. Heidfeld's right-rear suspension collapsed from heavy contact with a kerb and stopped on the track on the 37th lap, necessitating the safety car's deployment. This prompted a two-lap sprint to the finish from lap 42 with Bird leading. Sarrazin took third after Abt slowed with a battery management system failure on the final lap; Abt narrowly avoided collecting his teammate di Grassi as he endeavoured to rejoin the race. Vergne attempted to pass Bird by braking later than him, but he was not close enough to affect an overtake. Bird held the lead to claim his fourth career victory and become the first driver to win a motor race in New York City.

==== Second race ====
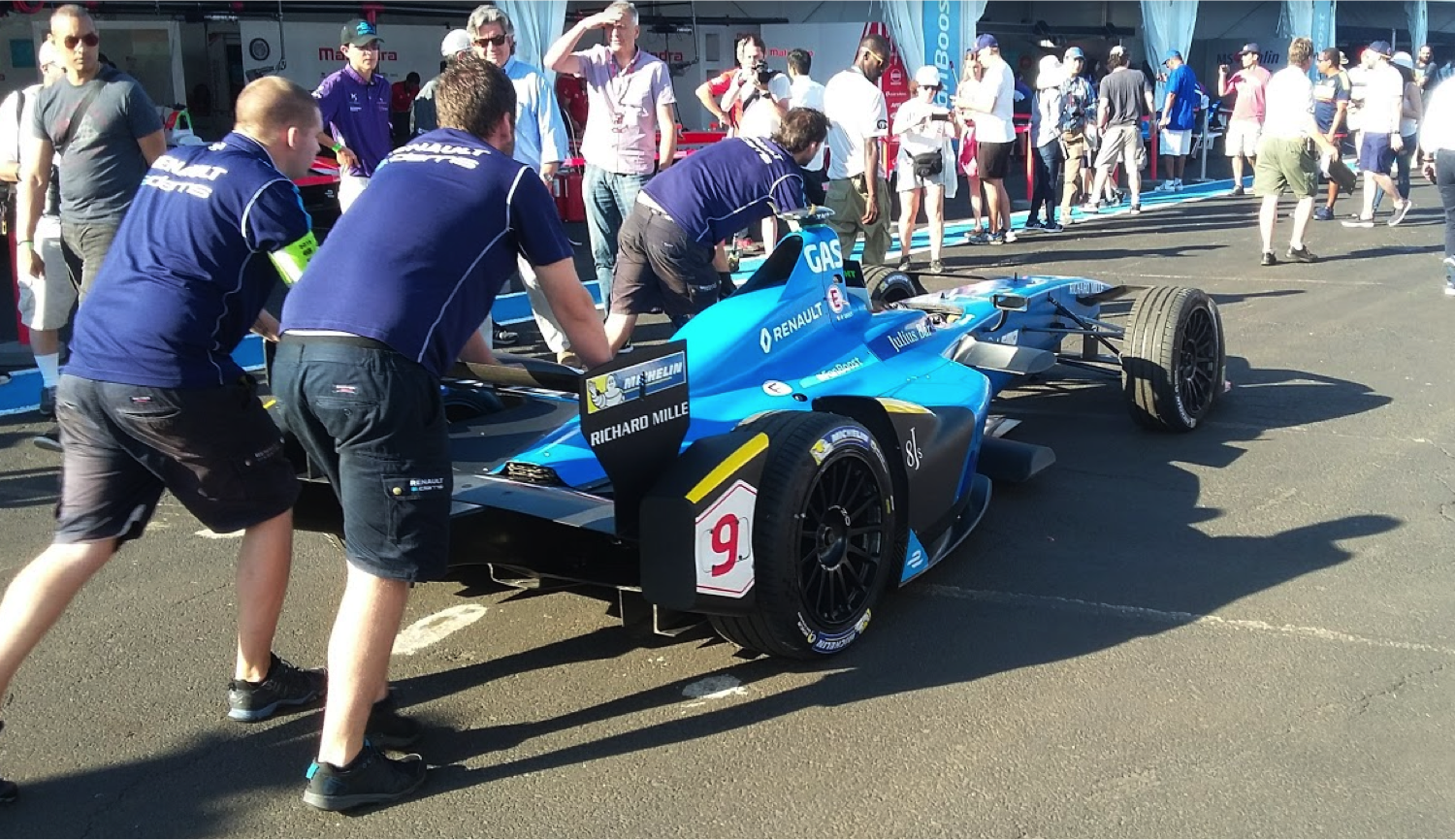
The car of Pierre Gasly in the paddock prior to Sunday qualifying. He replaced Buemi who had a World Endurance Championship commitment.

Bird carried his winning form from the previous day's race to earn pole position with a 0.037-second margin over Rosenqvist. Drivers ran six more laps in the second race, making battery management the primary concern. For the second consecutive ePrix, it was not the pole sitter who led as Rosenqvist accelerated faster than Bird to lead the first lap. Bird kept within reach of Rosenqvist in the opening laps, as Heidfeld gained on both drivers. The first full course yellow was prompted on lap nine when Evans hit a barrier near the entry to the pit lane and had difficulty reversing. Shortly after the restart, Bird caught Rosenqvist off guard and passed him for the lead on lap 11. Bird began to pull away from the field. A second full course yellow came nine laps later when Lynn stopped on the back straight with a technical problem, and it prompted several drivers to make pit stops. Bird remained on track for one additional lap before making his stop, giving him more electrical energy than the drivers behind him.

When racing resumed, Bird used the restart to increase his lead to three seconds over the Mahindra cars without overusing electrical energy. Mahindra located an energy readout issue on Rosenqvist's car, and the team prompted Heidfeld to pass him for second on lap 36 to see whether he could draw closer to Bird and pass him. Rosenqvist fell behind quickly so that his problem could be solved in a calmer environment. This allowed Bird to extend his advantage by another second. Heidfeld allowed his teammate Rosenqvist to reclaim second on the 48th (and penultimate) lap. An oversteer in the race's final moments did not deter Bird, who took his second consecutive victory of the season and the fifth of his career. Gasly caught Rosenqvist and Heidfeld on the final lap; all three drivers concertinaed through the final turn. As he challenged Heidfeld for third, an overspeed for Gasly caused him to drift into a wall lining the track. He hurled a detachable barrier onto the circuit, which no other driver collected. After the race weekend, di Grassi narrowed Buemi's championship lead to ten points heading into the season-closing Montreal ePrix.

=== Rounds 11 and 12 – Montreal ===
==== First race ====
A maximum of 59 points were available for the final ePrix which meant Buemi could still win the title if di Grassi won both races and Buemi took two pole positions and finished second twice. A heavy crash in the second practice session by Buemi prompted his team to construct a new car around a spare monocoque. He incurred a ten-place grid penalty for a change of battery. Di Grassi took his third career pole position by 0.196 seconds over Buemi in qualifying; the latter's penalty demoted him to 12th. Di Grassi held off Sarrazin at the start to lead the first lap. Buemi's conservative driving delayed him in a tight pack of cars and sustained steering damage from contact with Robin Frijns. While di Grassi pulled away to establish a large lead, attention switched to Buemi who gained positions. On the 14th lap, Heidfeld attempted to pass Duval; the latter defended and the two made contact. Duval continued driving and Heidfeld sustained front-right suspension damage. The full course yellow procedure was activated to allow for Heidfeld's damaged car to be removed from the track. This prompted most of the field to enter the pit lane and switch into their second cars.

Buemi was frustrated at Abt in the pit lane and Abt rammed into Buemi's rear. Swift work from Vergne's pit crew elevated him to third. His teammate Sarrazin ceded second and Vergne gained on di Grassi. López lost control of his car's rear on lap 24, and spun into a barrier, necessitating the safety car's deployment. The safety car was withdrawn five laps later, and racing resumed with di Grassi using his FanBoost to pull clear from Vergne's Techeetah. Vergne drew close to di Grassi in the final two laps. Di Grassi defended the lead from Vergne. Buemi closed up to third-place Sarrazin on the final lap; he did not get ahead, as di Grassi won the event. A visibly angered Buemi argued with Félix da Costa, Frijns and Abt after the race. He was later disqualified due to an underweight second car. Renault e.Dams did not appeal. Hence, di Grassi displaced season-long championship leader Buemi and held an 18-point advantage going into the season's final race.

==== Second race ====
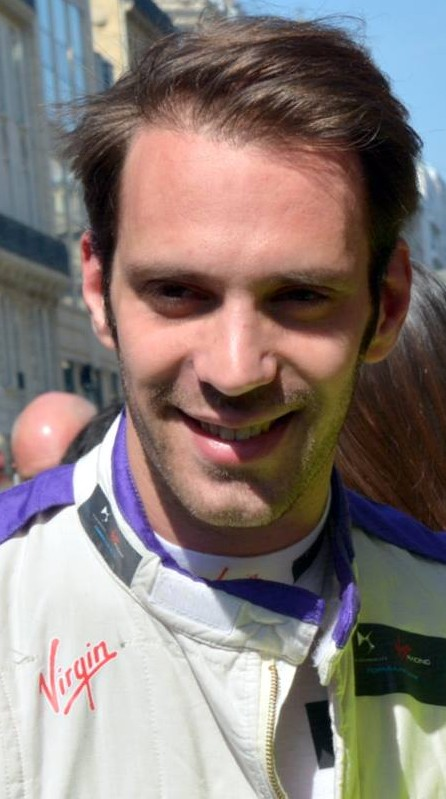
Jean-Éric Vergne (pictured in 2016) clinched his first motor racing victory in the second Montreal race since the 2011 Formula Renault 3.5 Series.

In qualifying for the second Montreal race, Rosenqvist took his third pole position with Bird in second. Di Grassi took fifth while a driving error restricted Buemi to 13th. Rosenqvist kept his pole position advantage on the first lap. Sarrazin spun following contact with Piquet, and Abt and blocked the track at the first turn. Buemi's right-rear wheel guard flailed and detached from contact with Félix da Costa. He was shown a black flag with an orange disc, requiring him to enter the pit lane for repairs. The loose bodywork part fell off his car and his short pit stop lost him positions. After ten laps, Vergne mounted an attack on Rosenqvist for the lead as the former had more usable electrical energy than the Mahindra ahead of him. He could not find any space to move in front. The mandatory change for drivers to switch into their second cars began on lap 18 when Engel and Piquet became the first drivers to enter the pit lane. Rosenqvist followed on the next lap with Vergne, López and both ABT Schaeffler Audi Sport cars of di Grassi and Abt staying on track for an additional lap to allow all four drivers to run in clean air.

Di Grassi's strategy of staying out for one extra lap did not work as his pit stop lasted two seconds longer than the agreed minimum pit stop time. He emerged in tenth, behind his teammate Abt. After the pit stops, Rosenqvist reclaimed the lead with a five-second advantage over Vergne. Vergne drew closer to race leader Rosenqvist on the 29th lap and took advantage of the latter lifting and coasting to overtake him for the lead. The improved top speed of Vergne enabled him to pull away quickly from Rosenqvist. López caught and could not pass Rosenqvist in the race's final laps. Vergne maintained the lead for the remainder of the race to clinch his maiden FE victory after securing eight podium results in the preceding three seasons. It was Vergne's first motor racing victory since the 2011 Formula Renault 3.5 Series round at Circuit Paul Ricard. Di Grassi advanced through the field to finish seventh and won his first Drivers' Championship. As Buemi finished 11th, and Prost took a solitary point for the fastest lap, Renault e.Dams retained the Teams' Championship for the third successive season.

== Results and standings ==
=== ePrix ===
Round	Race	Pole position	Fastest lap	Winning driver	Winning team	Report
1	Hong Kong	(Brazil) Nelson Piquet Jr.	(Sweden) Felix Rosenqvist	(Switzerland) Sébastien Buemi	(France) Renault e.Dams	Report
2	(Morocco) Marrakesh	(Sweden) Felix Rosenqvist	(France) Loïc Duval	(Switzerland) Sébastien Buemi	(France) Renault e.Dams	Report
3	(Argentina) Buenos Aires	(Brazil) Lucas di Grassi	(Sweden) Felix Rosenqvist	(Switzerland) Sébastien Buemi	(France) Renault e.Dams	Report
4	Mexico City	(United Kingdom) Oliver Turvey (Note: Daniel Abt set the fastest time but was excluded for an illegal tyre pressure.)	(Switzerland) Sébastien Buemi	(Brazil) Lucas di Grassi	(Germany) ABT Schaeffler Audi Sport	Report
5	Monaco	(Switzerland) Sébastien Buemi	(United Kingdom) Sam Bird	(Switzerland) Sébastien Buemi	(France) Renault e.Dams	Report
6	(France) Paris	(Switzerland) Sébastien Buemi	(United Kingdom) Sam Bird	(Switzerland) Sébastien Buemi	(France) Renault e.Dams	Report
7	(Germany) Berlin	(Brazil) Lucas di Grassi	(New Zealand) Mitch Evans	(Sweden) Felix Rosenqvist	(India) Mahindra Racing	Report
8	(Germany) Berlin	(Sweden) Felix Rosenqvist	(Germany) Maro Engel	(Switzerland) Sébastien Buemi (Note: Felix Rosenqvist and Mahindra Racing were the initial winners but was given a 10-second time penalty for an unsafe pit stop release.)	(France) Renault e.Dams	Report
9	(United States) New York City	(United Kingdom) Alex Lynn	(Germany) Maro Engel	(United Kingdom) Sam Bird	(United Kingdom) DS Virgin Racing	Report
10	(United States) New York City	(United Kingdom) Sam Bird	(Germany) Daniel Abt	(United Kingdom) Sam Bird	(United Kingdom) DS Virgin Racing	Report
11	(Canada) Montreal	(Brazil) Lucas di Grassi	(France) Loïc Duval	(Brazil) Lucas di Grassi	(Germany) ABT Schaeffler Audi Sport	Report
12	(Canada) Montreal	(Sweden) Felix Rosenqvist	(France) Nico Prost	(France) Jean-Éric Vergne	(China) Techeetah	Report

=== Drivers' standings ===
Points were awarded to the top ten classified finishers in every race, the pole position starter, and the driver who set the fastest lap, using the following structure:

Position	**1st**	**2nd**	**3rd**	**4th**	**5th**	**6th**	**7th**	**8th**	**9th**	**10th**	**Pole**	**FL**	**Ref**
Points	25	18	15	12	10	8	6	4	2	1	3	1	

Pos.	Driver	HKG (Hong Kong)	MRK (Morocco)	BUE (Argentina)	MEX (Mexico)	MCO (Monaco)	PAR (France)	BER (Germany)		NYC (United States)		MTL (Canada)		Pts
1	(Brazil) Lucas di Grassi	2*	5*	**3***	1*	2*	Ret*	**2***	3*	4*	5*	**1***	7*	181
2	(Switzerland) Sébastien Buemi	1*	1*	1*	13*	**1***	**1***	DSQ*	1*			DSQ*	11*	157
3	(Sweden) Felix Rosenqvist	15	**3**	18	16†	6	4	1	**2**	15	2	9	**2**	127
4	(United Kingdom) Sam Bird	13	2	Ret	3	Ret	16	7	7	1	**1**	5	4	122
5	(France) Jean-Éric Vergne	Ret	8	2	2	Ret	Ret	8	6	2*	8	2*	1	117
6	(France) Nico Prost	4	4	4	5	9	5	5	8	8	6	6	Ret	93
7	(Germany) Nick Heidfeld	3	9	15	12	3	3	3	10	Ret	3*	Ret	5	88
8	(Germany) Daniel Abt	Ret	6*	7*	7*	7	13†*	6*	4*	14†*	Ret*	4	6*	67
9	(Argentina) José María López	Ret*	10	10	6	Ret	2	4	5			Ret	3	65
10	(France) Stéphane Sarrazin	10	12	12	15	15†*	10	11	14	3	12†	3	8	36
11	(Brazil) Nelson Piquet Jr.	**11**	16	5	9	4	7	12	12	11	16†	13	16	33
12	(United Kingdom) Oliver Turvey	8	7	9	**Ret**	13†	12	10	9	6	14	15	17	26
13	(Netherlands) Robin Frijns	6	11	14	11	12	6	17	18	9	9	8	13	24
14	(New Zealand) Mitch Evans	Ret	17	13	4	10	9	Ret	17	NC	Ret	7	12	22
15	(France) Loïc Duval	14	18†	6	Ret	NC		15	Ret	5	13†	Ret	19†	20
16	(France) Pierre Gasly									7	4			18
17	(Germany) Maro Engel	9	NC	NC	Ret	5		9	NC	NC	Ret	12	18	16
18	(Belgium) Jérôme d'Ambrosio	7	13	8	14	Ret	Ret	13	13	Ret	10	11	9	13
19	(France) Tom Dillmann						8	18	15	13	7	10	10	12
20	(Portugal) António Félix da Costa	5	Ret	11	Ret	11	Ret	16	11	12	15	14	15	10
21	(United Kingdom) Adam Carroll	12	14	17	8	14	15	14	16	10	11	16	14	5
22	(Mexico) Esteban Gutiérrez				10	8	11							5
23	(United Kingdom) Alex Lynn									**Ret**	Ret			3
24	(United Kingdom) Mike Conway						14							0
25	(China) Ma Qinghua	Ret	15	16										0
Pos.	Driver	HKG (Hong Kong)	MRK (Morocco)	BUE (Argentina)	MEX (Mexico)	MCO (Monaco)	PAR (France)	BER (Germany)		NYC (United States)		MTL (Canada)		Pts

Colour	Result
Gold	Winner
Silver	Second place
Bronze	Third place
Green	Points classification
Blue	Non-points classification
Blue	Non-classified finish (NC)
Purple	Retired, not classified (Ret)
Red	Did not qualify (DNQ)
Red	Did not pre-qualify (DNPQ)
Black	Disqualified (DSQ)
White	Did not start (DNS)
White	Withdrew (WD)
White	Race cancelled (C)
Blank	Did not practice (DNP)
Blank	Did not arrive (DNA)
Blank	Excluded (EX)

**Bold** – Pole
Italics – Fastest Lap
* – FanBoost

Notes

† – Drivers did not finish the race, but were classified as they completed more than 90% of the race distance.

=== Teams' standings ===
Pos.	Team	No.	HKG (Hong Kong)	MRK (Morocco)	BUE (Argentina)	MEX (Mexico)	MCO (Monaco)	PAR (France)	BER (Germany)		NYC (United States)		MTL (Canada)		Points
1	(France) Renault e.Dams	8	4	4	4	5	9	5	5	8	8	6	6	Ret	268
1	(France) Renault e.Dams	9	1	1	1	13	**1**	**1**	DSQ	1	7	4	DSQ	11	268
2	(Germany) ABT Schaeffler Audi Sport	11	2	5	**3**	1	2	Ret	**2**	3	4	5	**1**	7	248
2	(Germany) ABT Schaeffler Audi Sport	66	Ret	6	7	7	7	13†	6	4	14†	Ret	4	6	248
3	(India) Mahindra Racing	19	15	**3**	18	16†	6	4	1	**2**	15	2	9	**2**	215
3	(India) Mahindra Racing	23	3	9	15	12	3	3	3	10	Ret	3	Ret	5	215
4	(United Kingdom) DS Virgin Racing	2	13	2	Ret	3	Ret	16	7	7	1	**1**	5	4	190
4	(United Kingdom) DS Virgin Racing	37	Ret*	10	10	6	Ret	2	4	5	**Ret**	Ret	Ret	3	190
5	(China) Techeetah	25	Ret	8	2	2	Ret	Ret	8	6	2	8	2	1	156
5	(China) Techeetah	33	Ret	15	16	10	8	12	11	14	3	12†	3	8	156
6	(United Kingdom) NextEV NIO	3	**11**	16	5	9	4	7	12	12	11	16†	13	16	59
6	(United Kingdom) NextEV NIO	88	8	7	9	**Ret**	13†	11	10	9	6	14	15	17	59
7	(United States) Andretti Formula E	27	6	11	14	11	12	6	17	18	9	9	8	13	34
7	(United States) Andretti Formula E	28	5	Ret	11	Ret	11	Ret	16	11	12	15	14	15	34
8	(United States) Faraday Future Dragon Racing	6	14	18	6	Ret	NC	14	15	Ret	5	13†	Ret	19†	33
8	(United States) Faraday Future Dragon Racing	7	7	13	8	14	Ret	Ret	13	13	Ret	10	11	9	33
9	(Monaco) Venturi Formula E	4	10	12	12	15	15†	10	18	15	13	7	10	10	30
9	(Monaco) Venturi Formula E	5	9	NC	NC	Ret	5	8	9	NC	NC	Ret	12	18	30
10	(United Kingdom) Panasonic Jaguar Racing	20	Ret	17	13	4	10	9	Ret	17	NC	Ret	7	12	27
10	(United Kingdom) Panasonic Jaguar Racing	47	12	14	17	8	14	15	14	16	10	11	16	14	27
Pos.	Team	No.	HKG (Hong Kong)	MRK (Morocco)	BUE (Argentina)	MEX (Mexico)	MCO (Monaco)	PAR (France)	BER (Germany)		NYC (United States)		MTL (Canada)		Points

Colour	Result
Gold	Winner
Silver	Second place
Bronze	Third place
Green	Points classification
Blue	Non-points classification
Blue	Non-classified finish (NC)
Purple	Retired, not classified (Ret)
Red	Did not qualify (DNQ)
Red	Did not pre-qualify (DNPQ)
Black	Disqualified (DSQ)
White	Did not start (DNS)
White	Withdrew (WD)
White	Race cancelled (C)
Blank	Did not practice (DNP)
Blank	Did not arrive (DNA)
Blank	Excluded (EX)

**Bold** – Pole
Italics – Fastest Lap
* – FanBoost

Notes

† – Drivers did not finish the race, but were classified as they completed more than 90% of the race distance.
