= 2017 Monaco ePrix =

Race 5 of 12 of the 2016–17 Formula E Championship
← Previous race	Next race →
- Layout of the Monaco Formula E street circuit

Race details
- Date: 13 May 2017
- Official name: 2017 FIA Formula E Monaco ePrix
- Location: Circuit de Monaco, Monte Carlo, Monaco
- Course: Street circuit
- Course length: 1.765 km (1.097 miles)
- Distance: 51 laps, 90.018 km (55.935 miles)
- Weather: Sunny: Air: 20.0 to 20.8 °C (68.0 to 69.4 °F), Track: 24.4 to 25.6 °C (75.9 to 78.1 °F)
- Attendance: 18,000

Pole position
Driver	(Switzerland) Sébastien Buemi	e.Dams-Renault
- Time: 53.313

Fastest lap
Driver	(United Kingdom) Sam Bird	Virgin-Citroën
- Time: 53.822 on lap 24

Podium
First	(Switzerland) Sébastien Buemi	e.Dams-Renault
Second	(Brazil) Lucas di Grassi	Audi Sport ABT
Third	(Germany) Nick Heidfeld	Mahindra

The 2017 Monaco ePrix (formally the 2017 FIA Formula E Monaco ePrix) was a Formula E electric motor race held on 13 May 2017 at the Circuit de Monaco in Monte Carlo before a crowd of 18,000 people. It was the fifth round of the 2016–17 Formula E Championship and the second Monaco ePrix. e.Dams-Renault driver Sébastien Buemi won the 51-lap race from pole position. Lucas di Grassi finished second for Audi Sport ABT and Mahindra driver Nick Heidfeld was third.

Buemi won the pole position by recording the fastest lap in qualifying and pulled away from di Grassi until the race was neutralised on the 22nd lap when the safety car was deployed following a collision between Nelson Piquet Jr. and Jean-Éric Vergne on lap 21. All drivers elected to switch into their second cars under safety car conditions, and Buemi kept the lead at the lap 26 restart. Buemi slowed to conserve electrical energy to ensure he would be able to finish the race and di Grassi began to narrow the deficit to him in the final laps. He was unable to pass the defensive Buemi who held the lead to secure the victory.

It was Buemi's fourth victory of the season, the tenth of his career, and his second consecutive in Monaco. The result moved Buemi further ahead of di Grassi in the Drivers' Championship to 15 points while Nico Prost kept third after finishing ninth. Vergne remained in fourth despite his retirement and Sam Bird was one point closer to him in fifth place. e.Dams-Renault increased their lead in the Teams' Championship over Audi Sport ABT by a further six points and Mahindra moved from fifth to third with seven races left in the season.

== Background ==
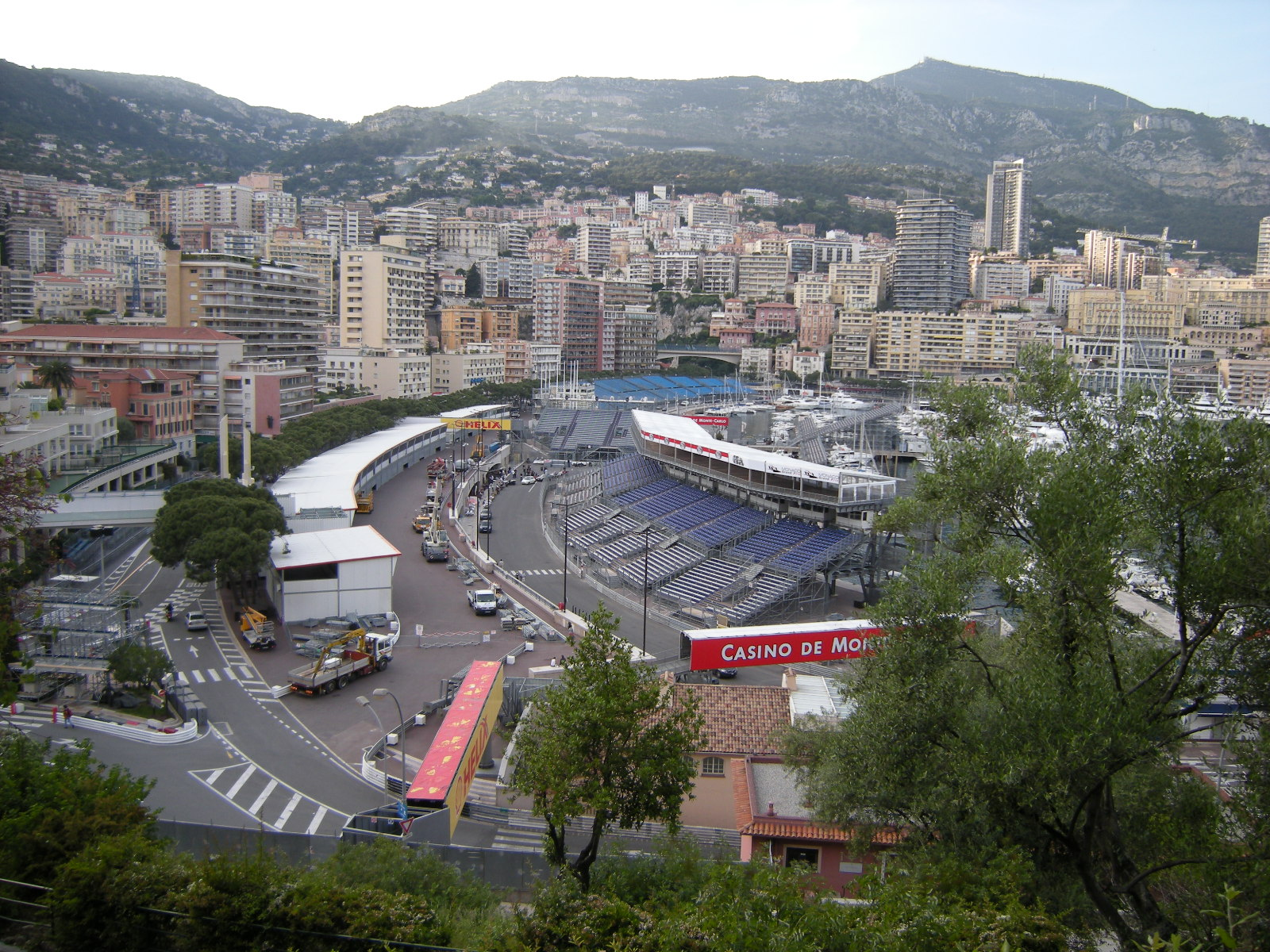
Circuit de Monaco (pictured in 2009), where the race was held.

The Monaco ePrix was confirmed as part of Formula E's 2016–17 schedule by the FIA World Motor Sport Council in September 2016. It was the fifth of twelve single-seater electric car races of the 2016–17 Championship, the second Monaco ePrix, and took place on 13 May 2017 at the Circuit de Monaco in Monte Carlo. The race returned after an absence of one year as it takes the slot occupied by the Historic Grand Prix every other year and due to a law limiting Monaco to holding two races per year. It had been proposed Monaco hold a race following the cancellation of the Moscow ePrix in the 2015–16 season but it did not proceed because of the lack of preparation time. The 12-turn clockwise 1.765 km (1.097 mi) Circuit de Monaco street circuit was the shortest track on the 2016–17 calendar and was heavily modified from the version used by Formula One for the Monaco Grand Prix.

Before the race e.Dams-Renault driver Sébastien Buemi led the Drivers' Championship with 76 points, six ahead of Lucas di Grassi in second and a further 25 ahead of Buemi's teammate Nico Prost in third. Jean-Éric Vergne was fourth on 46 points and Sam Bird was fifth with 33 points. e.Dams-Renault led the Teams' Championship with 122 points; Audi Sport ABT were in second place on 91 points. Virgin, Techeetah and Mahindra contended for third place.

After finishing 14th at the Mexico City race, Buemi, the pre-race favourite, arrived in Monaco with a lot of hope and expectation, saying: "Monaco is one of the best tracks on the calendar. I have great memories from 2015 and I will do my best to win a second time here." Di Grassi was looking forward to his "home race" because he was knowledgeable about the track as a Monaco resident and wanted to carry over his momentum from his Mexico City win into the principality: "We made an important step with the victory in Mexico to keep the championship exciting. We are once again in striking distance." However, he did not have the championship in his mind because his team wanted to focus on winning races and amassing points: "It’s very early to be talking about the championship. We’re [on] round five, there’s another eight to go." Nick Heidfeld said he was looking forward to racing in Monaco where he has extensive experience of racing at the track in other motorsport series and expressed his feeling that his chances of winning were improved with a competitive car and Mahindra wanted to score more points than in the last two races.

There were 20 participants entered by ten teams each for two per squad for the race. José María López's participation was under risk after damaging two vertebrae in a heavy crash at the 6 Hours of Silverstone. He stressed he would take part in Monaco if his doctors consented to it and hoped it would not be aggravated enough to prevent him from participating in the 24 Hours of Le Mans. It was reported that Virgin would have their reserve driver Alex Lynn on standby to drive López's car should the need arise. López was cleared to race after meeting with the Fédération Internationale de l'Automobile's medical team following the first practice session's conclusion. Robin Frijns injured his right knee ligaments while training and his team Andretti were concerned the injury would be worsened by the mandatory switch to his second car and drafted BMW factory driver Alexander Sims as a replacement if Frijns had further problems. After reporting an handing imbalance in the Mexico City ePrix (possibly due to chassis damage caused by his predecessor Ma Qinghua in multiple crashes), Esteban Gutiérrez received a new Techeetah chassis after the team made a successful request to the stewards to change it.

== Practice ==
Two practice sessions—both on Saturday morning—were held before the Saturday late afternoon race. The first session ran for 45 minutes and the second for 30 minutes. Unlike the preceding four races, the Friday shakedown session was not held. Both practice sessions took place in dry weather. In the first practice session, which saw lap times lower and multiple drivers lead, Buemi was fastest with a lap of 52.795 seconds, four-tenths ahead of teammate Prost in second. Stéphane Sarrazin (Venturi), Felix Rosenqvist, López, Vergne. Bird, Gutiérrez, Nelson Piquet Jr. and di Grassi made up positions three to ten. Prost spun at turn three and Adam Carroll (Jaguar) stopped close to a barrier at Anthony Noghes corner. Rosenqvist locked his tyres entering Sainte Dévote corner and went onto the turn's run-off area and Gutiérrez later made a similar error. The session ended early when NextEV's Oliver Turvey braked heavily to avoid passing Buemi into the Novelle Chicane under yellow flag conditions. Rosenqvist was caught off guard and ploughed heavily into Turvey's rear, destroying his car's front-right corner and heavily damaging Turvey's vehicle. Buemi used 200 kW (270 hp) of power to set the fastest lap of the second practice session at 52.729 seconds; Bird, di Grassi, Vergne, López, Loïc Duval, Daniel Abt, Piquet, Prost and Sarrazin completed the top ten. Prost struck the wall at Anthony Noghes corner with his front-right wheel, removing a small chunk from his car's bodywork, but was able to continue.

== Qualifying ==
Saturday afternoon's qualifying session ran for 60 minutes and was divided into four groups of five cars. Each group was determined by a lottery system and was permitted six minutes of on-track activity. All drivers were limited to two timed laps with one at maximum power. The fastest five overall competitors in the four groups participated in a "Super Pole" session with one driver on the track at any time going out in reverse order from fifth to first. Each of the five drivers was limited to one timed lap and the starting order was determined by the competitor's fastest times (Super Pole from first to fifth, and group qualifying from sixth to twentieth). The driver and team who recorded the fastest time were awarded three points towards their respective championships. Qualifying was held in dry weather.

In the first group of five runners, which saw the drivers drive on a slippery track surface and warmed their brakes and got their lock-ups resolved, Buemi was fastest on his maximum power lap, half a second quicker than Duval in second and Mitch Evans third. Turvey and António Félix da Costa were the group's slowest two drivers. Heidfeld was the fastest driver in the second group, four-tenths of a second ahead of Gutiérrez. Carroll (who damaged his wheel guard by hitting the barrier at the exit of the Swimming Pool complex) and Prost (who glanced the wall) followed in the next two positions. Jérôme d'Ambrosio aborted his timed lap and did not rememerge from the pit lane, causing him to start from 20th (and last) place. In the third group, Maro Engel went quicker than Buemi's benchmark lap time to go fastest overall. Di Grassi finished behind Engel in second place, followed by Bird in third position. Sarrazin and Frijns rounded the group's five competitors.

Vergne recorded the fastest overall timed lap of all drivers in the group stages in the fourth group at 53.286 seconds, 0.135 seconds quicker than the second-placed Piquet. Rosenqvist, López and Abt were the group's slowest three drivers. After group qualifying ended, the times set by Vergne, Engel, Buemi, Piquet and di Grassi progressed them into super pole. Di Grassi was the first driver to attempt his lap in super pole and lost control of the rear of his car, making contact with a wall leaving Anthony Noughes corner and qualified in second. Piquet was initially slower than di Grassi but recovered some of the lost time to take third place. Buemi drove cleanly to earn provisional pole position with a time of 53.313 seconds. Engel drove over a large section of kerb, drifted sideways into a barrier and took fifth. Vergne struggled to locate grip, locked his tyres heading into Sainte Dévote corner and qualified fourth. This secured Buemi his first pole position of the season, his second consecutive in Monaco, the seventh of his career, and his first since the 2016 London ePrix. He became the fifth consecutive driver to win pole position in the season's first five races. After qualifying ended, Duval was sent to the back of the grid for exceeding the maximum amount of permitted laps. After penalties, the rest of the order consisted of Engel, Rosenqvist, López, Heidfeld, Abt, Bird, Sarrazin, Frijns, Gutiérrez, Evans, Turvey, Félix da Costa, Carroll, Prost, d'Ambrosio and Duval.

=== Qualifying classification ===
Final qualifying classification
Pos.	No.	Driver	Team	GS	SP	Grid
1	9	(Switzerland) Sébastien Buemi	e.Dams-Renault	53.413	53.313	1
2	11	(Brazil) Lucas di Grassi	Audi Sport ABT	53.556	53.550	2
3	3	(Brazil) Nelson Piquet Jr.	NextEV NIO	53.421	53.606	3
4	25	(France) Jean-Éric Vergne	Techeetah-Renault	53.286	53.756	4
5	5	(Germany) Maro Engel	Venturi	53.397	55.013	5
6	19	(Sweden) Felix Rosenqvist	Mahindra	53.609	—N/a	6
7	37	(Argentina) José María López	Virgin-Citroën	53.666	—N/a	7
8	23	(Germany) Nick Heidfeld	Mahindra	53.687	—N/a	8
9	66	(Germany) Daniel Abt	Audi Sport ABT	53.725	—N/a	9
10	2	(United Kingdom) Sam Bird	Virgin-Citroën	53.729	—N/a	10
11	4	(France) Stéphane Sarrazin	Venturi	53.846	—N/a	11
12	6	(France) Loïc Duval	Dragon-Penske	53.929	—N/a	20^{1}
13	27	(Netherlands) Robin Frijns	Andretti-BMW	54.034	—N/a	12
14	33	(Mexico) Esteban Gutiérrez	Techeetah-Renault	54.092	—N/a	13
15	20	(New Zealand) Mitch Evans	Jaguar	54.115	—N/a	14
16	88	(United Kingdom) Oliver Turvey	NextEV NIO	54.522	—N/a	15
17	28	(Portugal) António Félix da Costa	Andretti-BMW	54.631	—N/a	16
18	47	(United Kingdom) Adam Carroll	Jaguar	55.031	—N/a	17
19	8	(France) Nico Prost	e.Dams-Renault	55.081	—N/a	18
20	7	(Belgium) Jérôme d'Ambrosio	Dragon-Penske	1:00.636	—N/a	19

Notes:

- ^1 — Loïc Duval was sent to the back of the grid for exceeding the number of permitted qualifying laps.

== Race ==
A special feature of Formula E is the "Fan Boost" feature, an additional 100 kW (130 hp) of power to use in the driver's second car. The three drivers who were allowed to use the boost were determined by a fan vote. For the Monaco race, Buemi, Sarrazin and di Grassi were handed the extra power. The weather at the start were dry and sunny with an air temperature between 20.0 to 20.8 °C (68.0 to 69.4 °F) and a track temperature from 24.4 to 25.6 °C (75.9 to 78.1 °F); conditions were expected to remain consistent and a 10 per cent chance of rain was forecast. The race began at 16:00 Central European Summer Time (UTC+2) before a crowd of 18,000 people. On the grid, Buemi maintained his pole position advantage heading into Sainte Dévote corner. Di Grassi ran close behind Buemi to keep second place. Heidfeld overtook Rosenqvist and Engel on the outside to move into fifth. Most of the field made a good start but some drivers were caught off guard by the concertina effect at Sainte Dévote with Piquet narrowly avoiding damaging his rear suspension after hitting the barrier, and Abt ran into the back of López, damaging his rear wing and nose cone. Bird made the equal best getaway in the field, gaining three positions by the end of lap one, while Sarrazin stalled after leaving the grid, dropping him to the back of the field.

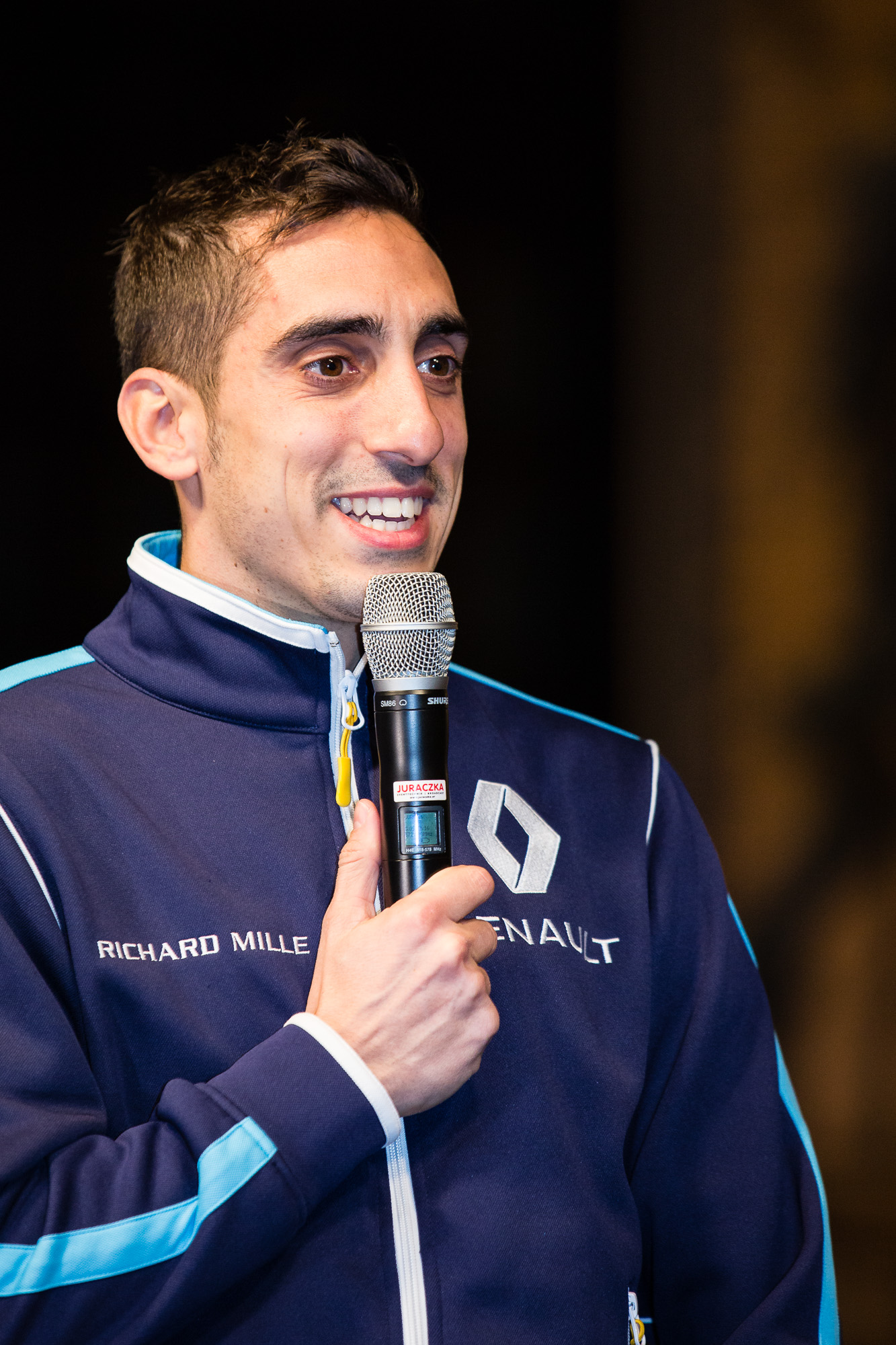
Sébastien Buemi (pictured in 2016) won the pole position and held off championship rival Lucas di Grassi to win the race.

At the end of the first lap, Buemi led di Grassi, Piquet, Vergne, Heidfeld, Engel, Bird, Rosenqvist, Frijns, López, Abt, Evans, Gutiérrez, Turvey, Carroll, Félix da Costa, Prost, d'Ambrosio, Duval and Sarrazin. Buemi began to pull away from di Grassi, establishing a lead of one second. The field settled down for the next six laps with nothing notable occurring. On lap eight, Bird went over the kerb at Tabac corner, lost control of the rear of his car, and veered into a barrier, damaging his rear suspension. Bird was forced to make a pit stop, while his teammate López was shown a black flag with an orange circle, requiring him to stop for repairs to his rear wing. Bird's mechanics repaired his vehicle's rear with a spanner and replaced López's rear wing. Both drivers returned to the track to begin battling for the fastest lap. Buemi continued to extend his lead over di Grassi and Piquet while Rosenqvist challenged Engel for sixth. Abt passed Frijns on the outside for eighth and closed up to the Engel and Rosenqvist battle. Piquet struggled to stay with the leading drivers, and Vergne was close behind him, steering left onto the inside. As both drivers locked their tyres, Piquet clambered with his steering wheel, and both cars made contact; Vergne ended his race in the Novelle Chicane barrier on lap 21.

The incident necessitated the deployment of the safety car on the following lap to allow Vergne's car to be extricated from the track and everyone made pit stops for the mandatory change into a second vehicle. Dragon teammates Duval and d'Ambrosio were the first drivers to enter the pit lane, and after the safety car was withdrawn on lap 26, racing resumed with Buemi leading di Grassi and Heidfeld. Buemi again started to pull away from di Grassi and was one second ahead after one lap. D'Ambrosio moved out of the train of cars a few laps later, stopped and restarted his car, causing him to drop down the field before entering the pit lane. Duval joined his teammate in the garage with mechanical problems on the 31st lap. Bird set the race's fastest lap on his 24th lap, completing a circuit in 53.822 seconds, earning him one championship point. Buemi lifted and coasted as he attempted to level out the electrical energy difference between himself and di Grassi; he used his FanBoost to maintain the advantage he had built up over the latter. Elsewhere, the stewards investigated Gutiérrez for an unsafe pit stop release but elected not to penalise the driver. The primary battle at this point was between Piquet, Engel, Rosenqvist and Abt but all four drivers drove reasonably to allow them one large push at the race's conclusion.

Di Grassi narrowed the gap to Buemi to half a second with six laps remaining. While pondering about an overtake on Buemi, both were delayed by slower traffic, causing di Grassi to drop back. Buemi had less available electrical energy than di Grassi which allowed his rival to run close behind him. Although di Grassi could not use his FanBoost because of battery voltage limitations, he drew closer to Buemi on the final lap. He forced Buemi to defend his position at the Swimming Pool complex and La Rascasse corner, but could not find the space to get ahead as run to the start/finish line was not long enough, allowing Buemi to fend him off and take his fourth victory of the season, the tenth of his career, and his second consecutive in Monaco. Di Grassi finished 0.320 seconds adrift in second with Heidfeld third. Heidfeld became the first driver to stand on the Monaco podium in both Formula One and Formula E. Piquet, Engel, Rosenqvist and Abt all finished close behind each other in positions four to seven. with Gutiérrez, Prost and Evans in eighth to tenth places. Félix da Costa was adjudged to have been unsafely released from his garage and incurred a 33-second time penalty that demoted him from ninth to 11th. His teammate Frijns was eighth in the final stages but he lost all electrical energy on the final lap and fell to 12th. Turvey, Carroll and Sarrazin were the final classified finishers. Of the other retirees, d'Ambrosio and Duval returned to the track but both retired with the former suffering from a powertrain malfunction and the latter was affected by regenerative braking problems, and both Virgin cars were not classified in the final results.

=== Post-race ===
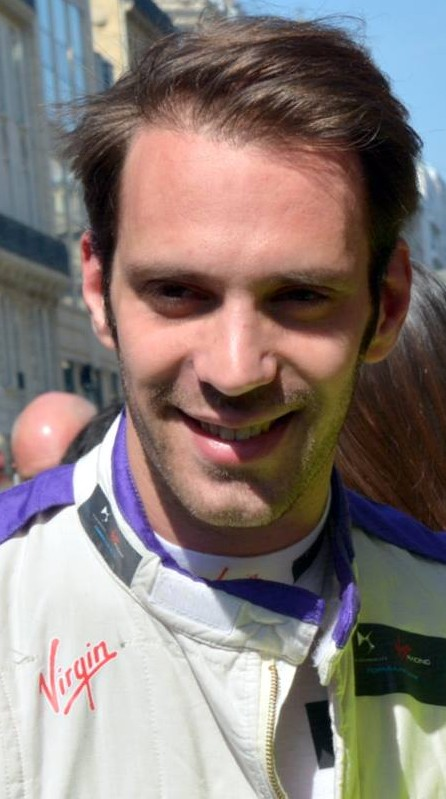
Jean-Éric Vergne (pictured in 2016) injured his right hand in a collision with Nelson Piquet Jr.

The top three drivers appeared on the podium to collect their trophies and spoke to the media in a later press conference. Buemi said after the safety car was sent out on the track, his team were aware about learning the tactics of making their pit stops early as used by Audi Sport ABT in the season-opening Hong Kong ePrix and the Mexico City race. He stated that felt that it was the right decision but was aware of the difficulty of finishing the event because of him having to conserve electrical energy and that he pulled a gap over di Grassi to maintain the lead. Di Grassi said during the race's first stint, he did not have enough pace as he was focused on saving electrical energy, but attempted to remain close to Buemi in the second half, and knew he could attack at the end of the race with the correct strategy. He revealed he did not want to risk colliding with Buemi because of the lack of overtaking opportunities around the tight confines of the Monaco circuit. Third-place finisher Heidfeld stated it felt good to return to the podium after sub-par results in the season's last two races. He revealed Mahindra heavily discussed their strategy and Heidfeld told them that they follow di Grassi's example which helped the team to finish on the podium.

Vergne's right hand was injured in the collision with Piquet and required an X-ray scan after complaining he was unable to move it correctly. He was annoyed with Piquet and briefly visited the NextEV garage to know if the latter had also retired. Vergne stated that he would ensure that he was fit for the next race of the season in Paris but spoke his feeling the incident "destroyed" his race in Monaco. He believed that the crash prevented him from finishing on the podium and he chose not to speak to Piquet after the event concluded. Piquet was annoyed at Vergne's attempts at overtaking him, labelling him "impatient" and said he felt he could have been easily passed during the pit stop phase. He thought Vergne would slow down because the latter was unwilling to be overtaken around the outside, and that Vergne had placed himself in that situation, deeming it "unnecessary" but spoke of his belief it was a "racing incident": "It's a shame, I hate that it happened with him and I hate these kinds of situations. I don't like bad feelings and I'm sure he's very upset and thinks I did it on purpose, but I was just going to defend my position." Vergne represented the incident as less important six days later by saying he did not regret performing his manoeuvre and it was part of motor racing.

The result extended Buemi's Drivers' Championship advantage over di Grassi to 15 points. Prost remained in third place with 48 points in spite of his poor performance. Vergne maintained fourth position on 40 points despite his retirement while Bird's fastest lap achievement narrowed the gap to the latter to six points. e.Dams-Renault's result increased their Teams' Championship lead over Audi Sport ABT by a further six points, while Mahindra's finish moved the team from fifth to third. Techeetah overtook Virgin for fourth place with seven races left in the season.

=== Race classification ===
Drivers who scored championship points are denoted in bold.

Final race classification
Pos.	No.	Driver	Team	Laps	Time/Retired	Grid	Points
1	**9**	**(Switzerland) Sébastien Buemi**	**e.Dams-Renault**	**51**	**51:05.488**	**1**	25+3^{1}
2	**11**	**(Brazil) Lucas di Grassi**	**Audi Sport ABT**	**51**	**+0.320**	**2**	18
3	**23**	**(Germany) Nick Heidfeld**	**Mahindra**	**51**	**+13.678**	**8**	15
4	**3**	**(Brazil) Nelson Piquet Jr.**	**NextEV NIO**	**51**	**+19.074**	**3**	12
5	**5**	**(Germany) Maro Engel**	**Venturi**	**51**	**+19.518**	**5**	10
6	**19**	**(Sweden) Felix Rosenqvist**	**Mahindra**	**51**	**+19.599**	**6**	8
7	**66**	**(Germany) Daniel Abt**	**Audi Sport ABT**	**51**	**+20.430**	**9**	6
8	**33**	**(Mexico) Esteban Gutiérrez**	**Techeetah-Renault**	**51**	**+32.295**	**13**	4
9	**8**	**(France) Nico Prost**	**e.Dams-Renault**	**51**	**+35.667**	**18**	2
10	**20**	**(New Zealand) Mitch Evans**	**Jaguar**	**51**	**+38.410**	**14**	1
11	28	(Portugal) António Félix da Costa	Andretti-BMW	51	+1:08.330	16^{3}	
12	27	(Netherlands) Robin Frijns	Andretti-BMW	51	+1:14.053	12	
13	88	(United Kingdom) Oliver Turvey	NextEV NIO	50	+1 Lap	15	
14	47	(United Kingdom) Adam Carroll	Jaguar	50	+1 Lap	17	
15	4	(France) Stéphane Sarrazin	Venturi	49	+2 Laps	11	
Ret	37	(Argentina) José María López	Virgin-Citroën	43	Suspension	7	
Ret	7	(Belgium) Jérôme d'Ambrosio	Dragon-Penske	43	Powertrain	19	
Ret	6	(France) Loïc Duval	Dragon-Penske	40	Brakes	20	
Ret	**2**	**(United Kingdom) Sam Bird**	**Virgin-Citroën**	**36**	**Suspension**	**10**	1^{2}
Ret	25	(France) Jean-Éric Vergne	Techeetah-Renault	20	Collision	4	

Notes:

- **^1** — Three points for pole position.
- **^2** — One point for fastest lap.
- **^3** — António Félix da Costa had 33 seconds added to his race time for an unsafe pit stop release.

== Standings after the race ==
Drivers' Championship standings

+/–	Pos	Driver	Points
	1	(Switzerland) Sébastien Buemi	104
	2	(Brazil) Lucas di Grassi	89 (−15)
	3	(France) Nico Prost	48 (−58)
	4	(France) Jean-Éric Vergne	40 (−64)
	5	(United Kingdom) Sam Bird	34 (−70)

Teams' Championship standings

+/–	Pos	Team	Points
	1	(France) e.Dams-Renault	152
	2	(Germany) Audi Sport ABT	115 (−37)
2	3	(India) Mahindra	60 (−88)
1	4	(China) Techeetah-Renault	45 (−107)
2	5	(United Kingdom) Virgin-Citroën	44 (−108)

- Notes: Only the top five positions are included for both sets of standings.

Previous race: 2017 Mexico City ePrix	FIA Formula E Championship; 2016–17 season	Next race: 2017 Paris ePrix
Previous race: 2015 Monaco ePrix	Monaco ePrix	Next race: 2019 Monaco ePrix
