= Adam Carroll (racing driver) =

British racing driver (born 1982)

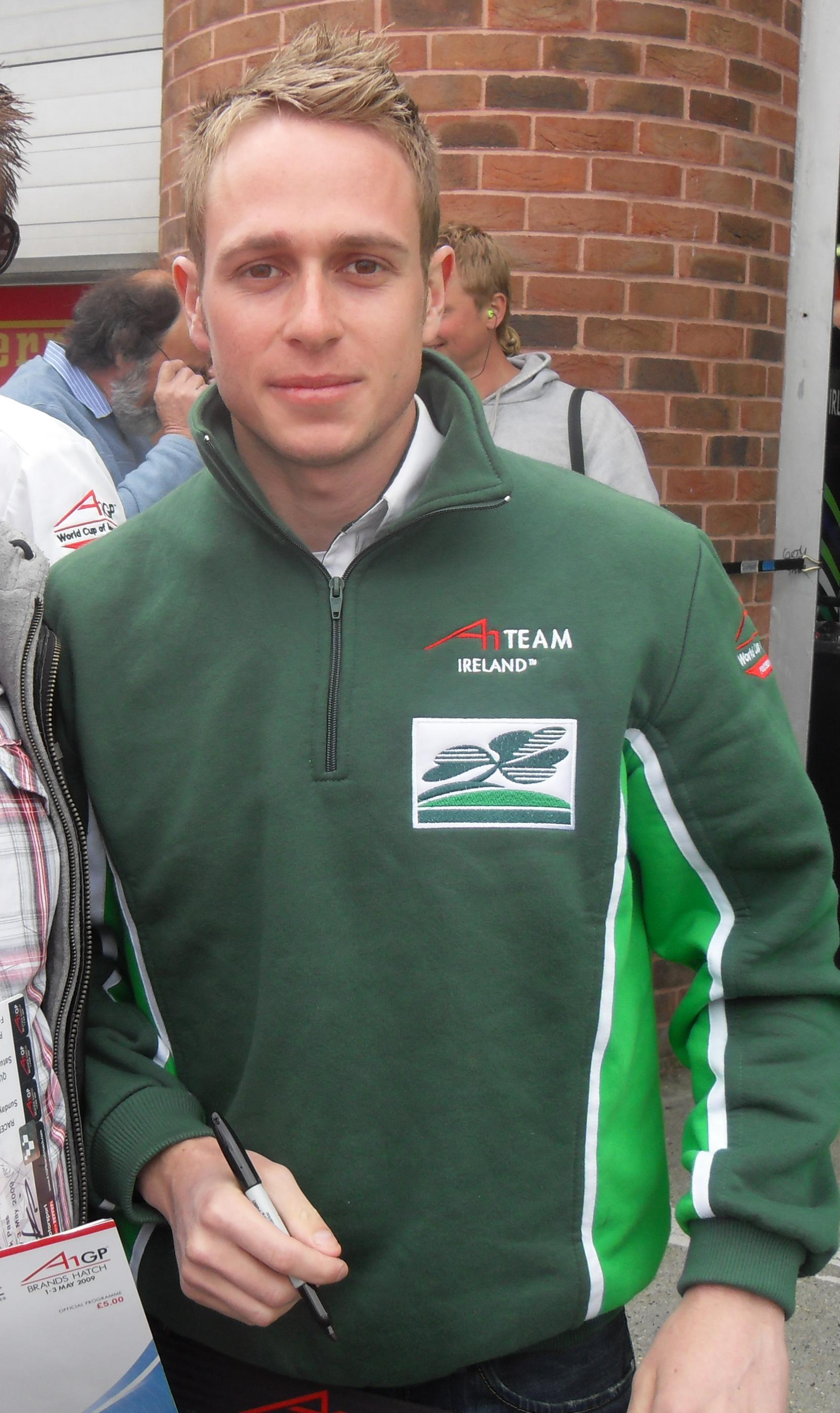
- Carroll at Brands Hatch in 2009
- Nationality: (United Kingdom) British (Republic of Ireland) Irish via dual nationality
- Born: Adam Norman Carroll; 26 October 1982 (age 44) Portadown, Northern Ireland

GP2 Series career
- Debut season: 2005
- Current team: Super Nova Racing
- Categorisation: FIA Platinum (until 2021); FIA Gold (2022–)
- Car number: 17
- Former teams: Racing Engineering; FMS International
- Starts: 72
- Wins: 5
- Poles: 1
- Fastest laps: 3
- Best finish: 5th in 2005

Formula E career
- Debut season: 2016–17
- Current team: Panasonic Jaguar Racing
- Car number: 47
- Starts: 12
- Championships: 0
- Poles: 0
- Fastest laps: 0
- Best finish: 21st in 2016–17
- Finished last season: 21st

Previous series
- 2011 2011 2010 2007–2009 2007 2005 2003 2002–2004 2000–2001 2000 1999 1999: Auto GP; Formula Renault 3.5; IndyCar; A1 Grand Prix; DTM; Formula One test driver Formula Three Euroseries; British F3; British Formula Ford; British FFord Winter Series; Formula Renault Campus France; Formula Palmer Audi Winter Series

Championship titles
- 2008–09 2002 2000: A1 Grand Prix; British F3 National Class; British FFord Winter Series

Adam Carroll (born 26 October 1982) is a British professional racing driver. He last raced in the 2016–17 Formula E season for Jaguar Racing. He has also raced for Team Ireland in A1 Grand Prix, winning the series in 2009.

== Career history ==
=== Early career ===
Carroll, who was born in Portadown, Northern Ireland, started his career in 1993 competing in karting events. He continued in karting until 1998. After winning the Elf LA FILIERE SCHOLARSHIP in 1999, he moved on to British Formula Ford, winning the Winter Series and taking third in the festival. He raced in the British Formula Ford competition in 2001, before successfully making the move to British Formula 3 B-Class in 2002 with the Sweeney team. Despite driving year-old cars, Carroll was always an outright front runner and he dominated the class winning the title with a record points tally.

=== International racing ===
In 2003, Carroll moved up to Championship Class British Formula 3, but due to lack of finance, he had little stability and finished the year having driven with three different teams (eight podiums in a row with Menu), before competing in part of the Formula Three Euroseries season, where despite being new to both team, series, track and tyres, he finished in the points in his first race. He also partnered and outperformed future Formula One driver Nico Rosberg in an end of season event in South Korea. He continued in Formula Three throughout 2004, finishing as runner up to Nelson Piquet Jr. before joining the 2005 GP2 Series, replacing Hayanari Shimoda at the Super Nova Racing team just before the start of the season.

Although Carroll's pre-season preparation for GP2 left him at a disadvantage to all the other drivers due to the lateness of his race deal and consequent lack of testing with his new team, he was immediately competitive, briefly challenging for the championship before slipping back as the season progressed due to reliability setbacks and on-track incidents.

Despite continually having trouble raising a budget for his racing, Carroll still managed to outperform drivers who had funding readily available to them, including 2005 team-mate, and ex F1 driver, Giorgio Pantano. His undoubted talent caught the eye of Formula One and in 2005 he was signed as a test driver for Formula One team BAR-Honda. For the 2006 GP2 season, he surprised many in choosing to join the Racing Engineering team when his previous team had a better chance of picking up the title. It soon became clear that due to Carroll's continued lack of sponsorship, the Racing Engineering deal saved him from having to drop out of top line motorsport altogether. He has since removed himself from the Honda driver program sensing a lack of opportunity as Button and Barrichello would be hard to replace.

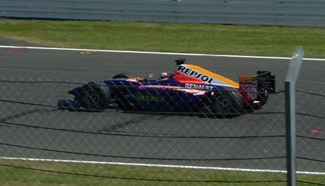
Adam Carroll, seen here on the warm up lap of the first GP2 race at Silverstone, England on 10 June 2006.

The only real high point of the 2006 season was a pole position, third place and second place combo at Silverstone. It was clear throughout the season, however, that Carroll's team was not as strong as the majority of the other teams in the series. This was highlighted many times due to car failures that cost him many points throughout the year. As well as this, the car was distinctly slower and he also had trouble with other drivers hitting him from behind. This coupled with a driver error while leading race two in Hungary cost Carroll a lot of points that, should he have gained them, he would have been in contention for at least third in the championship. As it was though, Carroll's 33 points was enough to give him eighth place (equal points with seventh-placed Gianmaria Bruni, with Bruni ahead having scored more wins). Carroll scored all of his team's points, outscoring his old team Super Nova Racing.

=== DTM, GP2 and A1GP ===
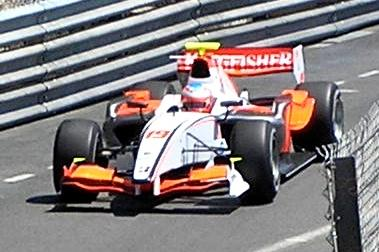
Carroll driving for FMS International at the Monaco round of the 2008 GP2 Series season.

For the start of the 2007 season, Carroll was driving a two-year-old Audi A4 in the German DTM series for the Futurecom TME team. On 26 June, it was announced that he would replace Antônio Pizzonia in the FMS GP2 team for the event supporting the French Grand Prix. Carroll won at the Silverstone round of the GP2 series and scored four other points to take a total of thirteen in one weekend, only his second back in GP2, in a car that had only scored one point beforehand. It was announced on 13 July that he had left the DTM due to sponsorship problems, and concentrated on GP2 for the rest of 2007. Carroll also went on to claim victory in the first race at the Hungaroring, despite starting sixth and changing all four tires during his mandatory pit stop. The season did not end so well for Carroll, as he scored only two points in the last three races despite being in contention for much more. However, he did finish in seventh place, ahead of many drivers who, unlike Carroll, had completed the entire season. During this time, Carroll had tested the A1GP car for Ireland, which led to him being signed to race in A1GP. In his first start, he scored Ireland's biggest points haul in the history of A1GP by scored a podium in his first race and despite starting eighteenth on the grid due to being blocked in qualifying, sixth in the feature race. Later in the season, he won the Mexico City feature race, Ireland's first win in A1GP. He also finished on the podium at Brands Hatch, en route to helping Team Ireland finish sixth overall in the championship.

Carroll began the 2008 GP2 Series season without a drive, but when Adrián Vallés was dropped by FMS International after the first round of the season, he took part in four races for his old team. He was then replaced by Marko Asmer.

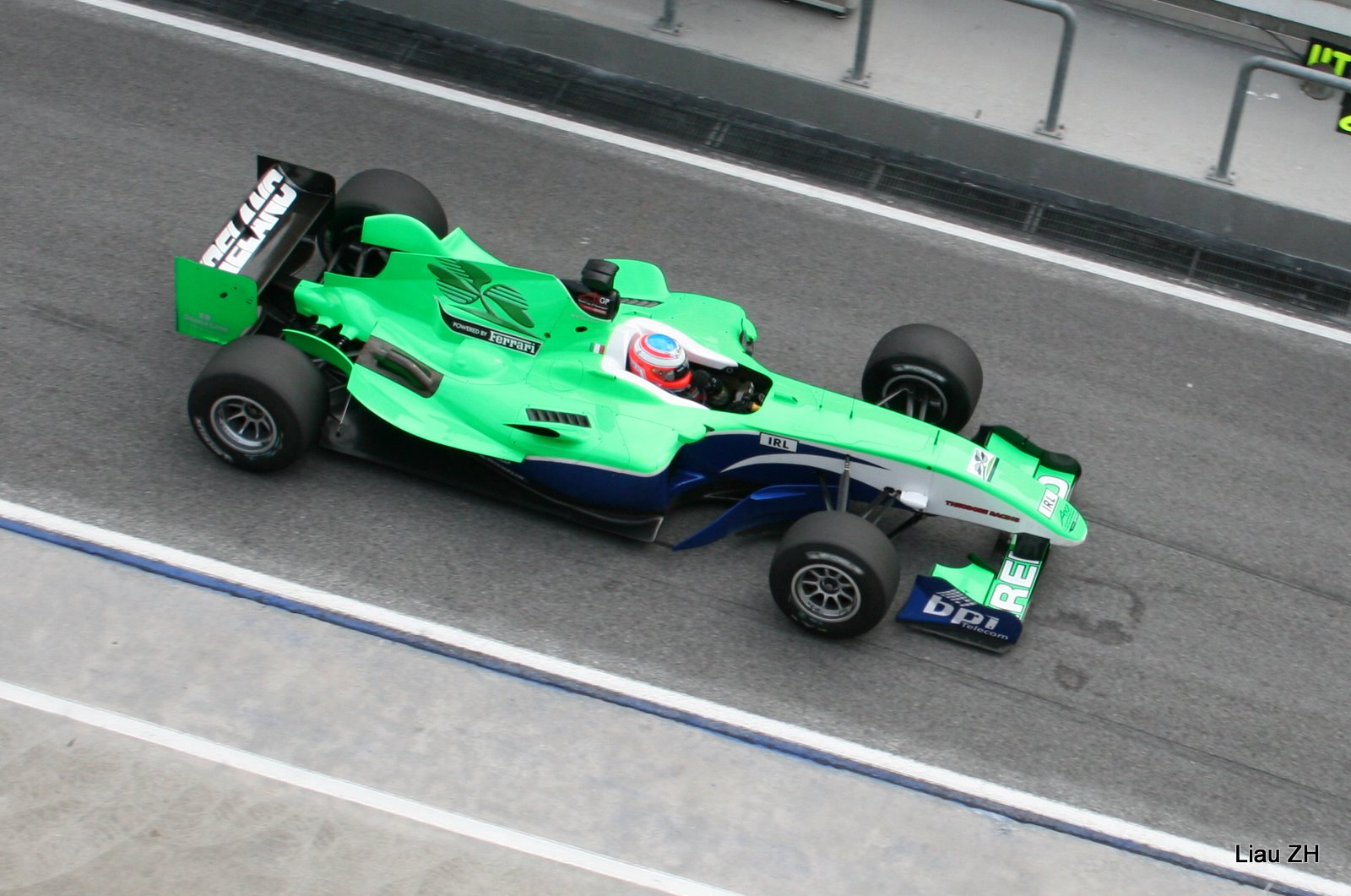
Carroll driving for A1 Team Ireland for the 2008-09 A1 Grand Prix season.

For 2008/2009, Carroll returned to A1GP and Team Ireland again leading them to victory for the first time, in China. A1 Team Ireland became the fourth A1 Grand Prix champions, after a title battle which went down to the final round in Great Britain. Ireland won with 112 points, all scored by Carroll and included five race victories and three fastest laps.

Carroll announced in April 2009 that he was approached by two F1 teams in negotiation for a driver's seat for 2010. It turned out that the two teams were Campos Meta and Manor GP, both of which were new entries for the 2010 season. Carroll said that he could not raise the 4 million Euros needed to sign for Virgin. He was also in line for a drive with Lola, which was also planning to enter the sport in 2010, but the British marque's entry was turned down.

=== IndyCar ===
IndyCar Series team Andretti Autosport announced that Carroll was to take part in some races during the second half of the 2010 season. He ultimately competed in the Watkins Glen Grand Prix and the Honda Indy 200, finishing in sixteenth and nineteenth places respectively. He scored 26 points in total and finished the season 34th in the drivers' championship.

=== 2011 ===
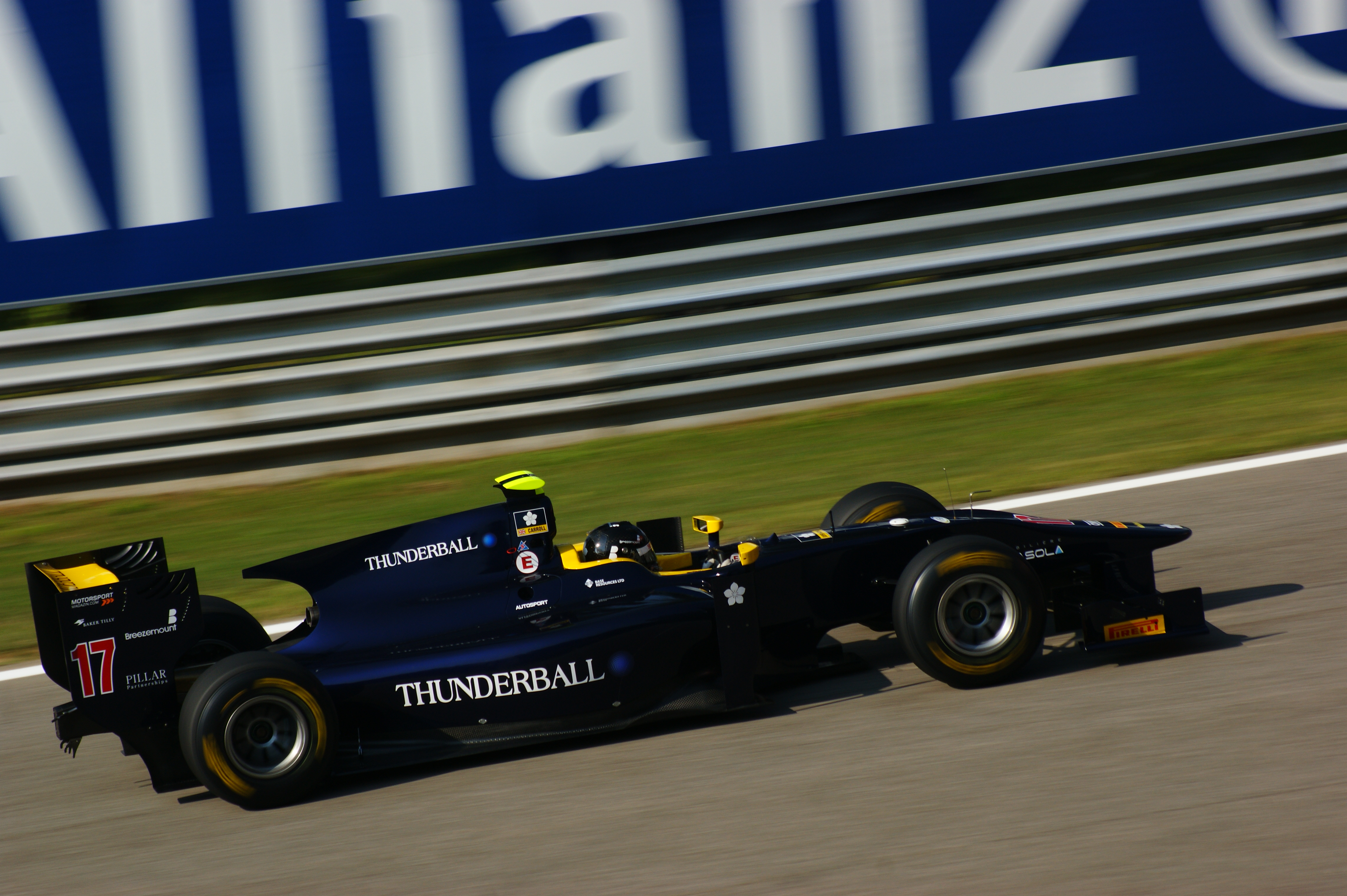
Carroll driving for Super Nova at the Monza round of the 2011 GP2 Series season.

On 2 July, Carroll made a one-off appearance in the Formula Renault 3.5 Series at the sixth round of the championship where he finished fourth and third in the two races. This was in place of the injured Austrian driver, Walter Grubmüller. He also drove in the Donington round of the Auto GP series taking pole and finishing fifth and second in the races. He then returned to GP2 with Super Nova Racing for the German round onwards, replacing Luca Filippi.

=== Formula E ===
Carroll frequented the series during the 2015–16 season as a potential substitute driver for Mahindra and Team Aguri, neither of which came to fruition. On 19 August 2016, Carroll was listed as one of four drivers partaking with Jaguar Racing in the 2016–17 Formula E pre-season test at Donington Park, having tested with the team previously. Carroll was subsequently signed with the team.

In the 2020–21 Formula E season, Carroll was signed as NIO 333's reserve driver.

=== Sports car racing ===
In 2023, Carroll joined Team WRT in the GT World Challenge Europe Endurance Cup, driving alongside Lewis Proctor and Tim Whale in the team's No. 31 entry. He also added a part-time campaign in the GT World Challenge America with Esses Racing.

== Racing record ==
=== Complete British Formula Three Championship results ===
(key)

Year	Entrant	Chassis	Engine	Class	1	2	3	4	5	6	7	8	9	10	11	12	13	14	15	16	17	18	19	20	21	22	23	24	25	26	27	DC	Points
2002	Sweeney Racing	Dallara F301	Mugen-Honda	S	BRH; 1 Ret	BRH; 2; 11	**DON**; **1**; 4	**DON**; **2**; 5	**SIL**; **1**; 2	**SIL**; **2**; 17	KNO; 1; 17	**KNO**; **2**; 14	CRO; 1 Ret	CRO; 2 C	**SIL**; **1**; 14	SIL; 2; 13	CAS; 1; 8	CAS; 2; 6	BRH; 1; 23	BRH; 2; 6	**ROC**; **1**; 8	**ROC**; **2**; 5	**OUL**; **1** Ret	OUL; 2 Ret	SNE; 1; 9	SNE; 2; 8	SNE; 3; 6	THR; 1; 9	THR; 2; 13	DON; 1; 17	**DON**; **2** Ret	1st	367
2003	Lola Cars	Lola-Dome F106-03	Mugen-Honda	C	DON; 1 Ret	DON; 2; 6	SNE; 1; 12	SNE; 2 Ret	CRO; 1	CRO; 2	KNO; 1	KNO; 2																				10th	90
2003	Menu F3 Motorsport	Dallara F303	Opel Spiess	C									SIL; 1; 2	SIL; 2; 12	CAS; 1; 2	CAS; 2; 3	OUL; 1; 3	OUL; 2; 2	ROC; 1; 10	ROC; 2 Ret	THR; 1 Ret	THR; 2; 3	SPA; 1; 10	SPA; 2 Ret	DON; 1	DON; 2	BRH; 1	BRH; 2				10th	90
2004	P1 Motorsport	Dallara F304	Mugen-Honda	C	**DON**; **1**; 1	DON; 2 Ret	SIL; 1; 4	SIL; 2 C	CRO; 1 Ret	CRO; 2 Ret	KNO; 1; 4	KNO; 2 Ret	SNE; 1; 2	SNE; 2; 2	SNE; 3; 1	CAS; 1; 3	**CAS**; **2**; 2	**DON**; **1**; 1	DON; 2; 7	OUL; 1; 4	OUL; 2; 8	SIL; 1; 5	SIL; 2; 18	THR; 1; 3	THR; 2; 7	SPA; 1; 1	**SPA**; **2**; 1	BRH; 1; 9	BRH; 2; 4			2nd	233

=== Complete Formula 3 Euro Series results ===
(key)

Year	Entrant	Chassis	Engine	1	2	3	4	5	6	7	8	9	10	11	12	13	14	15	16	17	18	19	20	DC	Points
2003	Opel Team KMS	Dallara F302/009	Spiess-Opel	HOC; 1	HOC; 2	ADR; 1	ADR; 2	PAU; 1	PAU; 2	NOR; 1	NOR; 2	LMS; 1	LMS; 2	NÜR; 1	NÜR; 2	A1R; 1; 6	A1R; 2 Ret	ZAN; 1; 11	ZAN; 2; 15	HOC; 1; 5	HOC; 2 Ret	MAG; 1 Ret	MAG; 2; 17	17th	7

=== Complete GP2 Series results ===
(key) (Races in bold indicate pole position) (Races in italics indicate fastest lap)

Year	Entrant	1	2	3	4	5	6	7	8	9	10	11	12	13	14	15	16	17	18	19	20	21	22	23	DC	Points
2005	Super Nova International	IMO; FEA; 5	IMO; SPR; 1	CAT; FEA; 7	CAT; SPR; 6	MON; FEA; 1	NÜR; FEA; Ret	NÜR; SPR; 2	MAG; FEA; 4	MAG; SPR; 6	SIL; FEA; 21	SIL; SPR; 8	HOC; FEA; Ret	HOC; SPR; 11	HUN; FEA; 9	HUN; SPR; 9	IST; FEA; 7	IST; SPR; 2	MNZ; FEA; 5	MNZ; SPR; 6	SPA; FEA; 8	SPA; SPR; 1	BHR; FEA; 9	BHR; SPR; 8	5th	53
2006	Racing Engineering	VAL; FEA; 14	VAL; SPR; Ret	IMO; FEA; Ret	IMO; SPR; 12	NÜR; FEA; 3	NÜR; SPR; 5	CAT; FEA; 10	CAT; SPR; 12	MON; FEA; Ret	**SIL**; **FEA**; 3	SIL; SPR; 2	MAG; FEA; 20	MAG; SPR; 14	HOC; FEA; 6	HOC; SPR; 8	HUN; FEA; 7	HUN; SPR; Ret	IST; FEA; 6	IST; SPR; 3	MNZ; FEA; Ret	MNZ; SPR; Ret			8th	33
2007	Petrol Ofisi FMS International	BHR; FEA	BHR; SPR	CAT; FEA	CAT; SPR	MON; FEA	MAG; FEA; DSQ	MAG; SPR; 14	SIL; FEA; 6	SIL; SPR; 1	NÜR; FEA; Ret	NÜR; SPR; 14	HUN; FEA; 1	HUN; SPR; 2	IST; FEA; 3	IST; SPR; 3	MNZ; FEA; Ret	MNZ; SPR; 15	SPA; FEA; Ret	SPA; SPR; 6	VAL; FEA; Ret	VAL; SPR; 15			7th	36
2008	Fisichella Motor Sport International	CAT; FEA	CAT; SPR	IST; FEA; 8	IST; SPR; Ret	MON; FEA; Ret	MON; SPR; Ret	MAG; FEA	MAG; SPR	SIL; FEA	SIL; SPR	HOC; FEA	HOC; SPR	HUN; FEA	HUN; SPR	VAL; FEA	VAL; SPR	SPA; FEA	SPA; SPR	MNZ; FEA	MNZ; SPR				25th	1
2011	Super Nova Racing	IST; FEA	IST; SPR	CAT; FEA	CAT; SPR	MON; FEA	MON; SPR	VAL; FEA	VAL; SPR	SIL; FEA	SIL; SPR	NÜR; FEA; 15	NÜR; SPR; 5	HUN; FEA; 19	HUN; SPR; 12	SPA; FEA; 9	SPA; SPR; 11	MNZ; FEA; 5	MNZ; SPR; 11						17th	6

=== Complete Deutsche Tourenwagen Masters results ===
(key) (Races in bold indicate pole position) (Races in italics indicate fastest lap)

Year	Team	Car	1	2	3	4	5	6	7	8	9	10	Pos	Points
2007	Futurecom TME	Audi A4 DTM 2005	HOC; Ret	OSC; 9	LAU; 11	BRH; 15	NOR; 17†	MUG	ZAN	NÜR	CAT	HOC	18th	0

† Driver did not finish, but was classified as he completed 90% of the winner's race distance.

=== Complete A1 Grand Prix results ===
(key) (Races in bold indicate pole position) (Races in italics indicate fastest lap)

Year	Entrant	1	2	3	4	5	6	7	8	9	10	11	12	13	14	15	16	17	18	19	20	DC	Points
2007–08	Ireland	NED; SPR	NED; FEA	CZE; SPR; 3	CZE; FEA; 6	MYS; SPR; 7	MYS; FEA; 7	ZHU; SPR; 4	ZHU; FEA; 16	NZL; SPR; 6	NZL; FEA; 5	AUS; SPR; 15	AUS; FEA; 13	RSA; SPR; 15	RSA; FEA; Ret	MEX; SPR; 4	MEX; FEA; 1	SHA; SPR; 11	SHA; FEA; 3	GBR; SPR; 3	GBR; FEA; 13	6th	94
2008–09	Ireland	NLD; SPR; Ret	NLD; FEA; Ret	**CHN**; **SPR**; 1	CHN; FEA; 2	MYS; SPR; 5	**MYS**; **FEA**; 1	**NZL**; **SPR**; 1	**NZL**; **FEA**; 2	RSA; SPR; 4	RSA; FEA; Ret	POR; SPR; 2	POR; FEA; 5	**GBR**; **SPR**; 1	**GBR**; **FEA**; 1							**1st**	**112**

=== American open–wheel results ===
(key)

==== IndyCar ====
Year	Team	No.	1	2	3	4	5	6	7	8	9	10	11	12	13	14	15	16	17	Rank	Points	Ref
2010	Andretti Autosport	27	SAO	STP	ALA	LBH	KAN	INDY	TXS	IOW	WGL; 16	TOR	EDM	MDO; 19	SNM	CHI	KTY	MOT	HMS	34th	26	

Years	Teams	Races	Poles	Wins	Podiums (Non-win)	Top 10s (Non-podium)	Indianapolis 500 Wins	Championships
1	1	2	0	0	0	0	0	0

=== Complete Formula Renault 3.5 Series results ===
(key) (Races in bold indicate pole position) (Races in italics indicate fastest lap)

Year	Entrant	1	2	3	4	5	6	7	8	9	10	11	12	13	14	15	16	17	Pos	Points
2011	P1 Motorsport	ALC; 1	ALC; 2	SPA; 1	SPA; 2	MNZ; 1	MNZ; 2	MON	NÜR; 1	NÜR; 2	HUN; 1; 4	HUN; 2; 3	SIL; 1	SIL; 2	LEC; 1	LEC; 2	CAT; 1	CAT; 2	17th	27

=== Complete Auto GP results ===
(key) (Races in bold indicate pole position) (Races in italics indicate fastest lap)

Year	Entrant	1	2	3	4	5	6	7	8	9	10	11	12	13	14	Pos	Points
2011	Campos Racing	MNZ; 1	MNZ; 2	HUN; 1	HUN; 2	BRN; 1	BRN; 2	**DON**; **1**; 5	DON; 2; 2	OSC; 1	OSC; 2	VAL; 1; 8	VAL; 2; 2	MUG; 1; 8	MUG; 2; 1	10th	64

=== Complete European Le Mans Series results ===
Year	Entrant	Class	Chassis	Engine	1	2	3	4	5	Rank	Points
2014	Gulf Racing UK	GTE	Porsche 911 GT3 RSR	Porsche 4.0 L Flat-6	SIL; 9	IMO; 8	RBR; 9			11th	28
2014	Gulf Racing UK	GTE	Porsche 911 RSR	Porsche 4.0 L Flat-6				LEC; 6	EST; 4	11th	28
2015	Gulf Racing UK	GTE	Porsche 911 RSR	Porsche 4.0 L Flat-6	SIL; 1	IMO; 8	RBR; 7	LEC; 7	EST; 3	4th	56

=== Complete British GT Championship results ===
(key) (Races in bold indicate pole position) (Races in italics indicate fastest lap)

Year	Team	Car	Class	1	2	3	4	5	6	7	8	9	10	DC	Points
2014	FF Corse	Ferrari 458 Italia GT3	GT3	OUL; 1	OUL; 2	ROC; 1	SIL; 1	SNE; 1 Ret	SNE; 2; 2	SPA; 1; 21	SPA; 2; 3	BRH; 1; 8	DON; 1	15th	39
2015	FF Corse	Ferrari 458 Italia GT3	GT3	OUL; 1; 2	OUL; 2; 6	ROC; 1 DSQ	SIL; 1	SPA; 1	BRH; 1; 5	SNE; 1; 11	SNE; 2 DNS	DON; 1		12th	41
2016	Barwell Motorsport	Lamborghini Huracán GT3	GT3	BRH; 1	ROC; 1; 4	OUL; 1; 1	OUL; 2; 5							8th	75.5
2016	FF Corse	Ferrari 488 GT3	GT3					SIL; 1; 3	SPA; 1	SNE; 1	SNE; 2	DON; 1		8th	75.5
2022	Balfe Motorsport	Audi R8 LMS Evo II	GT3	OUL; 1; 1	OUL; 2; 2	SIL; 1 Ret	DON; 1; 8	SNE; 1	SNE; 2	SPA; 1	BRH; 1	DON; 1		15th	49

=== Complete FIA World Endurance Championship results ===
Year	Entrant	Class	Car	Engine	1	2	3	4	5	6	7	8	9	Rank	Points
2016	Gulf Racing	LMGTE Am	Porsche 911 RSR	Porsche 4.0 L Flat-6	SIL; Ret	SPA; 5	LMS; 3	NÜR; 5	MEX; 4	COA; 4	FUJ; 4	SHA; 6	BHR; 4	7th	106

=== 24 Hours of Le Mans results ===
Year	Team	Co-Drivers	Car	Class	Laps	Pos.	Class Pos.
2016	(United Kingdom) Gulf Racing	(United Kingdom) Ben Barker (United Kingdom) Mike Wainwright	Porsche 911 RSR	GTE; Am	328	33rd	5th

=== Complete Formula E results ===
Year	Team	Chassis	Powertrain	1	2	3	4	5	6	7	8	9	10	11	12	Pos	Points
2016–17	Panasonic Jaguar Racing	Spark SRT01-e	Jaguar I-Type 1	HKG; 12	MRK; 14	BUE; 17	MEX; 8	MCO; 14	PAR; 15	BER; 14	BER; 16	NYC; 10	NYC; 11	MTL; 16	MTL; 14	21st	5

=== Ferrari Challenge Finali Mondiali results ===
Year	Class	Team	Car	Circuit	Pos.
2019	**Trofeo Pirelli Pro**	(Hungary) Ferrari Budapest - FF Corse	Ferrari 488 Challenge	(Italy) Mugello Circuit	**1st**

Sporting positions
Preceded by Neel Jani (Team Switzerland)	A1 Grand Prix; Champion (Team Ireland); 2008–09	Succeeded by None (Series ended)
