= Beijing ePrix =

- Beijing Olympic Green Circuit (2014–2015)

Race information
- Number of times held: 2
- First held: 2014
- Last held: 2015
- Circuit length: 3.44 km (2.14 miles)
- Race length: 89.4 km (55.7 miles)
- Laps: 26

Last race (2015)

Pole position
- (Switzerland) Sébastien Buemi; Renault e. Dams; 1:37.297

Podium
- 1. (Switzerland) S. Buemi; Renault e. Dams; 50:08.835; 2. (Brazil) L. di Grassi; ABT; +11.006; 3. (Germany) N. Heidfeld; Mahindra; +15.681

Fastest lap
- (Switzerland) Sébastien Buemi; Renault e. Dams; 1:39.993

The Beijing ePrix was an automobile race of the Formula E championship in Beijing, People's Republic of China. It was first raced in the 2014-15 season, of which the 2014 Beijing ePrix was the first Formula E race in history.

== Circuit ==
The ePrix took place at the Beijing Olympic Green Circuit. It ran around the grounds of the "Bird's Nest" Olympic stadium used in the 2008 Summer Olympics. The track featured 20 turns, and at 3.453 km (2.146 mi) was the longest track used in Formula E. Choosing the location and designing the track was done by designer Rodrigo Nunes in close cooperation with the FIA, Formula E, the People's Republic of China Motor Sport Federation, the Olympic Park Committee, the Mayor of Beijing, the Chinese Government, and event organiser China Racing.

== History ==
For the first Beijing ePrix on 13 September 2014 of the first Formula E race was ever the same time, were 75,000 spectators in the Olympic Park to the route. Admission to the event site was free, only the courts in the stands at the start-finish line were chargeable. 40 million people watched the race. Lucas di Grassi won the first ePrix. He benefited from a collision between Nicolas Prost and Nick Heidfeld, who were involved in an accident shortly before the last corner.

== Results ==
| Edition | Track | Winner | Second | Third | Pole position | Fastest lap | Ref |
|---|---|---|---|---|---|---|---|
| 2014 | Olympic Green | (Brazil) Lucas di Grassi; Audi Sport Abt | (France) Franck Montagny; Andretti Autosport | (United Kingdom) Sam Bird; Virgin Racing | (France) Nicolas Prost e. Dams Renault | (Japan) Takuma Sato; Amlin Aguri | |
| 2015 | Olympic Green | (Switzerland) Sébastien Buemi; Renault e.dams | (Brazil) Lucas di Grassi; Abt Schaeffler Audi Sport | (Germany) Nick Heidfeld; Mahindra Racing | (Switzerland) Sébastien Buemi; Renault e.dams | (Switzerland) Sébastien Buemi; Renault e.dams | |
