= 2015 Beijing ePrix =

Race 1 of 10 of the 2015–16 Formula E season
Next race →
- Layout of the Beijing Olympic Green Circuit

Race details
- Date: 24 October 2015
- Official name: 2015 FIA Formula E SWUSP Beijing ePrix
- Location: Beijing Olympic Green Circuit, Chaoyang District, Beijing, China
- Course: Street circuit
- Course length: 3.44 km (2.14 miles)
- Distance: 26 laps, 89.4 km (55.67 miles)

Pole position
Driver	(Switzerland) Sébastien Buemi	Renault e.Dams
- Time: 1:37.297

Fastest lap
Driver	(Switzerland) Sébastien Buemi	Renault e.Dams
- Time: 1:39.993 (lap record) on lap 24

Podium
First	(Switzerland) Sébastien Buemi	Renault e.Dams
Second	(Brazil) Lucas di Grassi	ABT Schaeffler Audi Sport
Third	(Germany) Nick Heidfeld	Mahindra Racing

The 2015 Beijing ePrix, formally the 2015 FIA Formula E SWUSP Beijing ePrix, was a Formula E motor race that was held on 24 October 2015 at the Beijing Olympic Green Circuit in Beijing, China. It was the second edition of the Beijing ePrix and the first race of the second season of the electrically powered racing car series. The race was dominated by Sébastien Buemi, who won starting from pole position. Since he also recorded the fastest lap, he became the first driver to score the maximum of 30 points from a single ePrix.

== Report ==
=== Background ===
The Beijing Olympic Green Circuit was slightly modified in comparison to the previous year. The first chicane, previously Turns 3, 4 and 5, has been removed with the second chicane taking a tighter profile than last year. Drivers believe that the modified layout offers increased chances of overtaking.

Three drivers made their Formula E debut at this ePrix: Jacques Villeneuve (for Venturi), Robin Frijns (for Amlin Andretti) and Nathanaël Berthon (for Team Aguri).

Trulli did not start the Beijing ePrix because of a failure to submit their car for scrutineering. The team claimed that key components had been held up in customs. They will be able to resubmit their car for scrutineering for the second race.

The Fanboost was awarded to Nelson Piquet Jr., Sam Bird and Oliver Turvey.

=== Qualifying ===
Sébastien Buemi, Jean-Éric Vergne, Nicolas Prost, Nick Heidfeld, and Lucas di Grassi advanced to the pole position shoot-out. Di Grassi was first on track, however he had a big lock up into turn 1, and therefore was unable to set a competitive time. Heidfeld then set a solid but unspectacular time, before Prost went and lapped eight-tenths faster than the German. Then Vergne went out, only to have such a big lock up at turn 1 he went straight down the escape road, and gave up. That left Buemi to try to beat 2014's polesitter, and a poor middle sector made that look unlikely, but he then superbly negotiated the final sector to take pole position.

=== Race ===
Buemi got a good start from pole, while Heidfeld was quick off the line, passing Prost round the outside of turn 1 in a similar move to the one he did in the previous year's race, before attacking race leader Buemi, unsuccessfully. Buemi then pulled away. On lap 2, prost locked up and ran deep, gifting Di Grassi third place. Simona de Silvestro then went straight into the wall on lap 3, bringing out a full course yellow. Meanwhile, a battle for 5th place at the time developed between Vergne and Bruno Senna, Loïc Duval and Sam Bird. Bird then lost out when he locked up and went down the escape road, but he caught back up by lap 11, and was in the ever changing battle again. Most people pitted at the end of lap 13, and a slow stop for Heidfeld dropped him from 2nd to 4th. Heidfeld did overtake Prost for a podium again. Crucially, both Dragon cars stayed out, giving them more usable energy at the end of the race. Jacques Villeneuve and António Félix da Costa collided, putting the Portuguese driver out of the race and bringing out a full course yellow, giving even more of the advantage to the Dragon cars who lost less time. Prost was more alert than Heidfeld off the restart and went through. His rear wing then broke on lap 20, although it made no difference to performance, but he was forced to retire. This left the Dragon cars with more usable energy, having already caught Heidfeld, to fight the Mahindra driver for the final spot on the podium. Jérôme d'Ambrosio locked up and was lucky to avoid his teammate. On the final lap, Heidfeld had to park the bus, and however hard the Frenchman tried, Duval simply couldn't find a way past the Mahindra in a battle that went right to the final corner. Buemi crossed the line to dominantly win, while Di Grassi, having been very quiet throughout the race, finished 2nd. Heidfeld just managed to keep his podium. The reigning champion Nelson Piquet Jr. finished, albeit two laps down in the last classified position.

== Classification ==
=== Qualifying ===
Pos.	No.	Driver	Team	Time	Gap	Grid
1	9	(Switzerland) Sébastien Buemi	Renault e.Dams	1:37.488		1^{1}
2	25	(France) Jean-Éric Vergne	DS Virgin Racing	1:38.028	+0.540	5^{1}
3	8	(France) Nicolas Prost	Renault e.Dams	1:38.206	+0.718	2^{1}
4	23	(Germany) Nick Heidfeld	Mahindra Racing	1:38.512	+1.024	3^{1}
5	11	(Brazil) Lucas di Grassi	ABT Schaeffler Audi Sport	1:38.519	+1.031	4^{1}
6	4	(France) Stéphane Sarrazin	Venturi	1:38.645	+1.157	6
7	21	(Brazil) Bruno Senna	Mahindra Racing	1:38.761	+1.273	7
8	6	(France) Loïc Duval	Dragon Racing	1:38.859	+1.371	8
9	2	(United Kingdom) Sam Bird	DS Virgin Racing	1:38.884	+1.396	9
10	7	(Belgium) Jérôme d'Ambrosio	Dragon Racing	1:39.058	+1.570	10
11	66	(Germany) Daniel Abt	ABT Schaeffler Audi Sport	1:39.220	+1.732	11
12	12	(Canada) Jacques Villeneuve	Venturi	1:39.665	+2.177	12
13	27	(Netherlands) Robin Frijns	Amlin Andretti	1:39.672	+2.184	13
14	28	(Switzerland) Simona de Silvestro	Amlin Andretti	1:39.681	+2.193	14
15	88	(United Kingdom) Oliver Turvey	NEXTEV TCR	1:39.734	+2.246	15
16	55	(Portugal) António Félix da Costa	Team Aguri	1:40.295	+2.807	16
17	77	(France) Nathanaël Berthon	Team Aguri	1:40.386	+2.898	17
18	1	(Brazil) Nelson Piquet Jr.	NEXTEV TCR	1:40.638	+3.150	18

Notes:

- ^1 – Final grid position of top five qualifiers determined by Super Pole shootout.

=== Super Pole ===
Pos.	No.	Driver	Team	Time	Gap	Grid
1	9	(Switzerland) Sébastien Buemi	Renault e.Dams	1:37.297		1
2	8	(France) Nicolas Prost	Renault e.Dams	1:37.581	+0.284	2
3	23	(Germany) Nick Heidfeld	Mahindra Racing	1:38.339	+1.042	3
4	11	(Brazil) Lucas di Grassi	ABT Schaeffler Audi Sport	1:39.539	+2.242	4
5	25	(France) Jean-Éric Vergne	DS Virgin Racing	2:21.284	+43.987	5

=== Race ===
Pos.	No.	Driver	Team	Laps	Time/Retired	Grid	Points
1	9	(Switzerland) Sébastien Buemi	Renault e.Dams	26	50:08.835	1	25+3+2^{2}
2	11	(Brazil) Lucas di Grassi	ABT Schaeffler Audi Sport	26	+11.006	4	18
3	23	(Germany) Nick Heidfeld	Mahindra Racing	26	+15.681	3	15
4	6	(France) Loïc Duval	Dragon Racing	26	+16.009	8	12
5	7	(Belgium) Jérôme d'Ambrosio	Dragon Racing	26	+16.514	10	10
6	88	(United Kingdom) Oliver Turvey	NEXTEV TCR	26	+39.466	15	8
7	2	(United Kingdom) Sam Bird	DS Virgin Racing	26	+47.531	9	6
8	77	(France) Nathanaël Berthon	Team Aguri	26	+58.620	17	4
9	4	(France) Stéphane Sarrazin	Venturi	26	+1:07.814	6	2
10	27	(Netherlands) Robin Frijns	Amlin Andretti	26	+1:09.260	13	1
11	66	(Germany) Daniel Abt	ABT Schaeffler Audi Sport	26	+1:13.351^{3}	11	
12	25	(France) Jean-Éric Vergne	DS Virgin Racing	26	+1:31.040	5	
13	21	(Brazil) Bruno Senna	Mahindra Racing	26	+1:50.833	7	
14	12	(Canada) Jacques Villeneuve	Venturi	25	+1 Lap	12	
15	1	(Brazil) Nelson Piquet Jr.	NEXTEV TCR	24	+2 Laps	18	
Ret	8	(France) Nicolas Prost	Renault e.dams	22	Rear wing	2	
Ret	55	(Portugal) António Félix da Costa	Team Aguri	13	Collision	16	
Ret	28	(Switzerland) Simona de Silvestro	Amlin Andretti	2	Accident	14	
DNP	10	(Mexico) Salvador Durán	Trulli	0	Failed Scrutineering	-	
DNP	18	(Italy) Vitantonio Liuzzi	Trulli	0	Failed Scrutineering	-	

Notes:

- ^2 – Three points for pole position and two points for fastest lap.
- ^3 - Daniel Abt received a 10-seconds time penalty for an unsafe pit stop release.

== Standings after the race ==
Drivers' Championship standings

Pos	Driver	Points
1	(Switzerland) Sébastien Buemi	30
2	(Brazil) Lucas di Grassi	18
3	(Germany) Nick Heidfeld	15
4	(France) Loïc Duval	12
5	(Belgium) Jérôme d'Ambrosio	10

Teams' Championship standings

Pos	Constructor	Points
1	(France) Renault e.Dams	30
2	(United States) Dragon Racing	22
3	(Germany) ABT Schaeffler Audi Sport	18
4	(India) Mahindra Racing	15
5	(China) NEXTEV TCR	8

- Notes: Only the top five positions are included for both sets of standings.

Previous race: 2015 London ePrix; 2014–15 season	FIA Formula E Championship; 2015–16 season	Next race: 2015 Putrajaya ePrix
Previous race: 2014 Beijing ePrix	Beijing ePrix	Next race: -
