= 2014 Beijing ePrix =

Formula E motor race

- Race 1 of 11 of the 2014–15 Formula E season
- Layout of the Beijing Olympic Green Circuit

Race details
- Date: 13 September 2014
- Official name: 2014 FIA Formula E Evergrande Spring Beijing ePrix
- Location: Beijing Olympic Green Circuit, Chaoyang District, Beijing, China
- Course: Street circuit
- Course length: 3.44 km (2.14 miles)
- Distance: 25 laps, 86.0 km (53.5 miles)

Pole position
Driver	(France) Nicolas Prost	e.dams-Renault
- Time: 1:42.200

Fastest lap
Driver	(Japan) Takuma Sato	Amlin Aguri
- Time: 1:45.101 on lap 21

Podium
First	(Brazil) Lucas di Grassi	Audi Sport ABT
Second	(France) Franck Montagny	Andretti
Third	(United Kingdom) Sam Bird	Virgin Racing

The 2014 Beijing ePrix, formally the 2014 FIA Formula E Evergrande Spring Beijing ePrix, was a Formula E motor race that was held on 13 September 2014 at the Beijing Olympic Green Circuit in Beijing, China. It was the first Championship race of the single-seater, electrically powered racing car series' inaugural season. The race was won by Lucas di Grassi for the Audi Sport ABT team, ahead of Franck Montagny and Sam Bird.

== Report ==
=== Race ===
Nicolas Prost claimed pole position for the race for the e.dams-Renault team and, with the exception of one lap during the pit stops, led the race up until the final corner. That was the moment when Nick Heidfeld had closed the gap to Prost and made an overtaking manoeuvre. Prost hit Heidfeld while they were side to side, sending the German driver into a spin. Heidfeld's car then hit the kerb sideways, and flipped into the barrier. The collision forced both drivers to retire from the race, and Lucas di Grassi went through to claim victory. Montagny finished second, while Daniel Abt was third on track, but was penalised 57 seconds for exceeding "the maximum permitted electrical power during the race," relegating him to tenth position, which promoted Bird to the final place on the podium. Jaime Alguersuari and Katherine Legge also received 57-second penalties: Alguersuari for the same transgression, and Legge for a pit violation.

Despite his retirement, Prost collected three championship points for his pole position, and Takuma Sato, who was also unable to complete the race, gained two points for recording the fastest lap of the race. During the race, three drivers were able to gain benefit from a "fan boost" which gave them an extra 30 kilowatts of power for two five-second stints. The drivers voted to receive this were Bruno Senna, Legge, and Di Grassi. However, none of the drivers actually used the boost of energy during the race, leading the organization to mandate the use for coming races.

== Classification ==
=== Qualifying ===
Pos.	No.	Driver	Team	Time	Gap	Grid
1	8	(France) Nicolas Prost	e.dams-Renault	1:42.200		1
2	11	(Brazil) Lucas di Grassi	Audi Sport ABT	1:42.306	+0.106	2
3	66	(Germany) Daniel Abt	Audi Sport ABT	1:42.454	+0.254	3
4	5	(India) Karun Chandhok	Mahindra Racing	1:42.461	+0.261	4
5	27	(France) Franck Montagny	Andretti	1:42.530	+0.330	8^{1}
6	23	(Germany) Nick Heidfeld	Venturi	1:42.579	+0.379	5
7	3	(Spain) Jaime Alguersuari	Virgin Racing	1:42.683	+0.483	6
8	28	(France) Charles Pic	Andretti	1:42.726	+0.526	7
9	9	(Switzerland) Sébastien Buemi	e.dams-Renault	1:42.746	+0.546	18^{2}
10	99	(Brazil) Nelson Piquet Jr.	China Racing	1:42.785	+0.585	9
11	6	(Spain) Oriol Servia	Dragon Racing	1:42.847	+0.647	10
12	2	(United Kingdom) Sam Bird	Virgin Racing	1:42.918	+0.718	11
13	7	(Belgium) Jérôme d'Ambrosio	Dragon Racing	1:44.056	+1.856	12
14	55	(Japan) Takuma Sato	Amlin Aguri	1:44.129	+1.929	13
15	88	(China) Ho-Pin Tung	China Racing	1:45.282	+3.082	PL^{2}
16	77	(United Kingdom) Katherine Legge	Amlin Aguri	1:45.369	+3.169	14
17	18	(Italy) Michela Cerruti	Trulli	1:46.170	+3.970	16^{2}
18	10	(Italy) Jarno Trulli	Trulli	2:16.788	+34.588	20^{2}
19	21	(Brazil) Bruno Senna	Mahindra Racing	2:32.729	+50.529	15
20	30	(France) Stéphane Sarrazin	Venturi	3:22.723	+1:40.523	19^{2}

Notes:

- ^1 – Franck Montagny received a three-place grid penalty for entering the fast lane during qualifying before the green light.
- ^2 – Michela Cerruti, Ho-Pin Tung, Sébastien Buemi, Stéphane Sarrazin and Jarno Trulli each received a ten-place grid penalty for a gearbox change. Tung later opted to start from the pitlane.

=== Race ===
Pos.	No.	Driver	Team	Laps	Time/Retired	Grid	Points
1	11	(Brazil) Lucas di Grassi	Audi Sport ABT	25	52:23.413	2	25
2	27	(France) Franck Montagny	Andretti	25	+2.867	8	18
3	2	(United Kingdom) Sam Bird	Virgin Racing	25	+6.559	11	15
4	28	(France) Charles Pic	Andretti	25	+19.301	7	12
5	5	(India) Karun Chandhok	Mahindra Racing	25	+23.952	4	10
6	7	(Belgium) Jérôme d'Ambrosio	Dragon Racing	25	+31.664	12	8
7	6	(Spain) Oriol Servià	Dragon Racing	25	+41.968	10	6
8	99	(Brazil) Nelson Piquet Jr.	China Racing	25	+43.896	9	4
9	30	(France) Stéphane Sarrazin	Venturi	25	+43.975	19	2
10	66	(Germany) Daniel Abt	Audi Sport ABT	25	+1:02.507^{1}	3	1
11	3	(Spain) Jaime Alguersuari	Virgin Racing	25	+2:00.613^{1}	6	
12	8	(France) Nicolas Prost	e.dams-Renault	24	Collision	1	3^{3}
13	23	(Germany) Nick Heidfeld	Venturi	24	Collision	5	
14	18	(Italy) Michela Cerruti	Trulli	24	+1 lap	16	
15	77	(United Kingdom) Katherine Legge	Amlin Aguri	24	+1 lap^{2}	14	
16	88	(China) Ho-Pin Tung	China Racing	23	+2 laps	PL	
Ret	55	(Japan) Takuma Sato	Amlin Aguri	21	Mechanical	13	2^{4}
Ret	9	(Switzerland) Sébastien Buemi	e.dams-Renault	14	Rear wing	18	
Ret	10	(Italy) Jarno Trulli	Trulli	2	Battery	20	
Ret	21	(Brazil) Bruno Senna	Mahindra Racing	0	Collision	15	

Notes:

- ^1 – Daniel Abt and Jaime Alguersuari each received a drive through penalty converted into a 57-second time penalty for exceeding the allowed battery usage limit of 208kW.
- ^2 - Katherine Legge received a drive through penalty converted into a 57-second time penalty for crossing the white lane at pit exit.
- ^3 – Three points for pole position.
- ^4 – Two points for fastest lap.

== Standings after the race ==
Drivers' Championship standings

Pos	Driver	Points
1	(Brazil) Lucas di Grassi	25
2	(France) Franck Montagny	18
3	(United Kingdom) Sam Bird	15
4	(France) Charles Pic	12
5	(India) Karun Chandhok	10

Teams' Championship standings

Pos	Constructor	Points
1	(United States) Andretti	30
2	(Germany) Audi Sport ABT	26
3	(United Kingdom) Virgin Racing	15
4	(United States) Dragon Racing	14
5	(India) Mahindra Racing	10

- Notes: Only the top five positions are included for both sets of standings.

Previous race: N/A	FIA Formula E Championship; 2014–15 season	Next race: 2014 Putrajaya ePrix
Previous race: N/A	Beijing ePrix	Next race: 2015 Beijing ePrix
