= Bruno Senna =

Brazilian racing driver (born 1983)

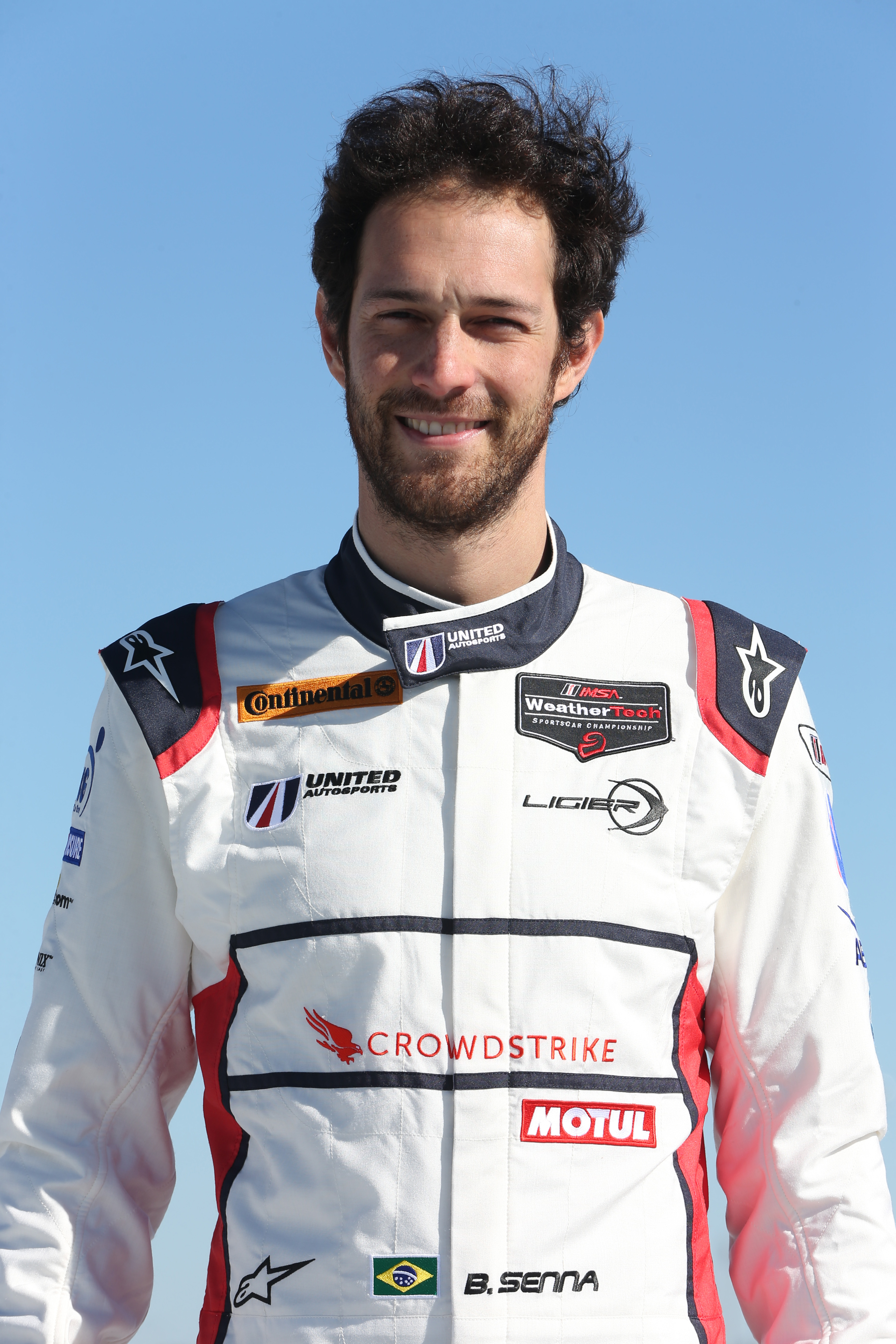
- Senna in 2018
- Born: Bruno Senna Lalli; 15 October 1983 (age 43); São Paulo, Brazil
- Spouse: Ludovica Colombotto Rosso (m. 2023)
- Parent: Viviane Senna (mother)
- Relatives: Ayrton Senna (uncle)

Formula One World Championship career
- Nationality: (Brazil) Brazilian
- Active years: 2010–2012
- Team(s): HRT, Renault, Williams
- Entries: 46
- Championships: 0
- Wins: 0
- Podiums: 0
- Career points: 33
- Pole positions: 0
- Fastest laps: 1
- First entry: 2010 Bahrain Grand Prix
- Last entry: 2012 Brazilian Grand Prix

FIA World Endurance Championship career
- Categorisation: FIA Platinum
- Years active: 2013–2014, 2016–2020
- Teams: Aston Martin, Morand, Rebellion
- Starts: 42
- Championships: 1 (2017)
- Wins: 11
- Podiums: 27
- Poles: 11
- Fastest laps: 5
- Best finish: 1st in 2017 (LMP2)

Formula E career
- Years active: 2014–2016
- Teams: Mahindra
- Car number: 21
- Starts: 21
- Championships: 0
- Wins: 0
- Podiums: 1
- Poles: 0
- Fastest laps: 1

24 Hours of Le Mans career
- Years: 2009, 2013–2014, 2016–2020
- Teams: Oreca, Aston Martin, Morand, Rebellion
- Best finish: 2nd (2020)
- Class wins: 0

Previous series
- 2018–2019; 2017–2018; 2009; 2008; 2007–2008; 2006; 2005–2006; 2004: ELMS; IMSA SportsCar; Le Mans Series; GP2 Asia Series; GP2 Series; Porsche Supercup; British F3; Formula BMW UK

Awards
- 2012: Lorenzo Bandini Trophy

Bruno Senna Lalli (Brazilian Portuguese: [ˈbɾunu ˈsenɐ]; born 15 October 1983) is a Brazilian former racing driver who competed in Formula One from 2010 to 2012. In endurance racing, Senna won the 2017 FIA Endurance Trophy in the LMP2 class with Rebellion.

Born and raised in São Paulo, Senna is a nephew of three-time World Drivers' Champion Ayrton Senna. He made his debut in Formula One for HRT in 2010, raced for Renault from August 2011 as a replacement for Nick Heidfeld, and drove for the Williams team in 2012. Between 2014 and 2016, he drove for Mahindra in Formula E.

== Early life ==
Bruno Senna Lalli was born on 15 October 1983 in São Paulo, Brazil, the second eldest of three to businessman Flávio Pereira Lalli and Viviane Senna Lalli (née Senna da Silva), who worked as a psychotherapist and businesswoman. His mother was raised in São Paulo with his two uncles, Ayrton and Leonardo, and his grandparents Milton Teodoro Guirado da Silva and Neide Senna da Silva. Senna's family owns multiple businesses in Brazil which involve agriculture and cars.

Senna started karting on the family farm at the age of five and was taught by his grandfather Milton and his uncle Ayrton, who was a Formula One driver for McLaren at the time. Senna stated his main influence was his grandfather and Ayrton, having learnt mechanics by fixing the engines of jet skis or go-karts that his uncle owned. Ayrton regarded Senna's potential very highly during his youth, saying in 1993, "If you think I'm fast, just wait until you see my nephew".

== Career ==
=== Early career ===
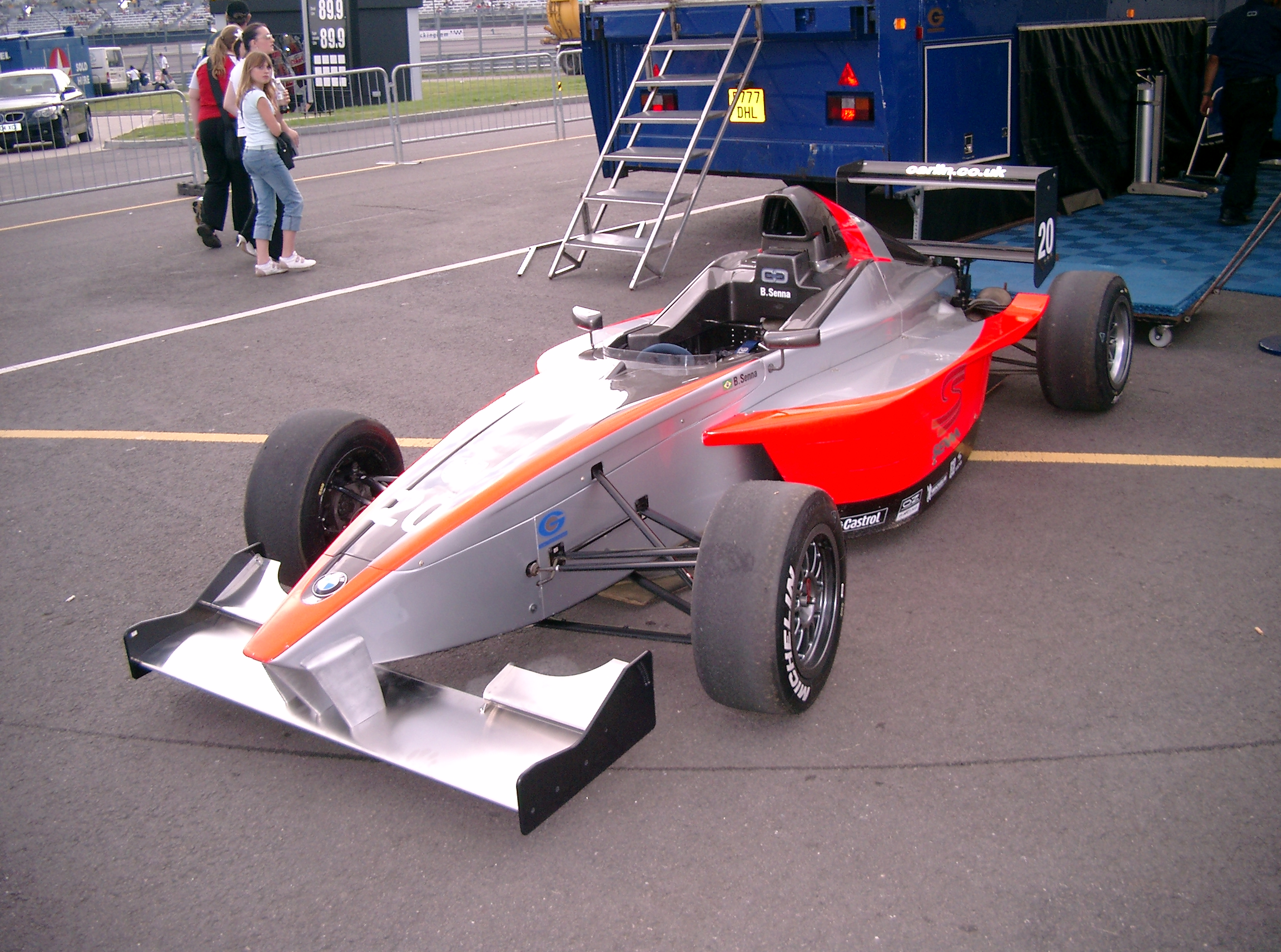
Senna's 2004 Formula BMW UK car at Rockingham

Ayrton's death while driving a Williams at the 1994 San Marino Grand Prix, however, brought Bruno's own racing career to an abrupt halt. Despite these setbacks, including the death of his father in a motorbike accident in 1996, Bruno's mother and his uncle Ayrton's sister Viviane had reluctantly backed her son's interest in motor racing.

At Imola in 2004, on the tenth anniversary of his uncle's death, Senna was given an example of his uncle's 1986 Lotus 98T as a gift from an Italian friend. Senna drove the car at the 2004 Brazilian Grand Prix meeting in São Paulo, at Interlagos, where Ayrton had won in 1991 and 1993. Ayrton's McLaren teammate from 1990 to 1992, Gerhard Berger, is a close friend of the Senna family and has advised Senna on his career. Senna's sister, Bianca, meanwhile, has managed his affairs and sponsorship acquisition.

In 2004, Senna competed in six races of the Formula BMW UK series for Carlin Motorsport, scoring six points.

=== Formula 3 (2005–2006) ===
In 2005, Senna moved on to the British Formula Three Championship, driving for the Räikkönen Robertson Racing team owned by then-McLaren Formula One driver Kimi Räikkönen and his business managers David and Steve Robertson. His results included three podium finishes in the last seven races of the season, as he finished tenth in the final standings. In 2006, he stayed with the team and finished third in the series standings behind champion and teammate Mike Conway and Oliver Jarvis, taking five victories. He won the opening two races of the series at Oulton Park in the wet. He again won the first race at Donington Park and then won the second race at Mugello in Italy, again in the wet.

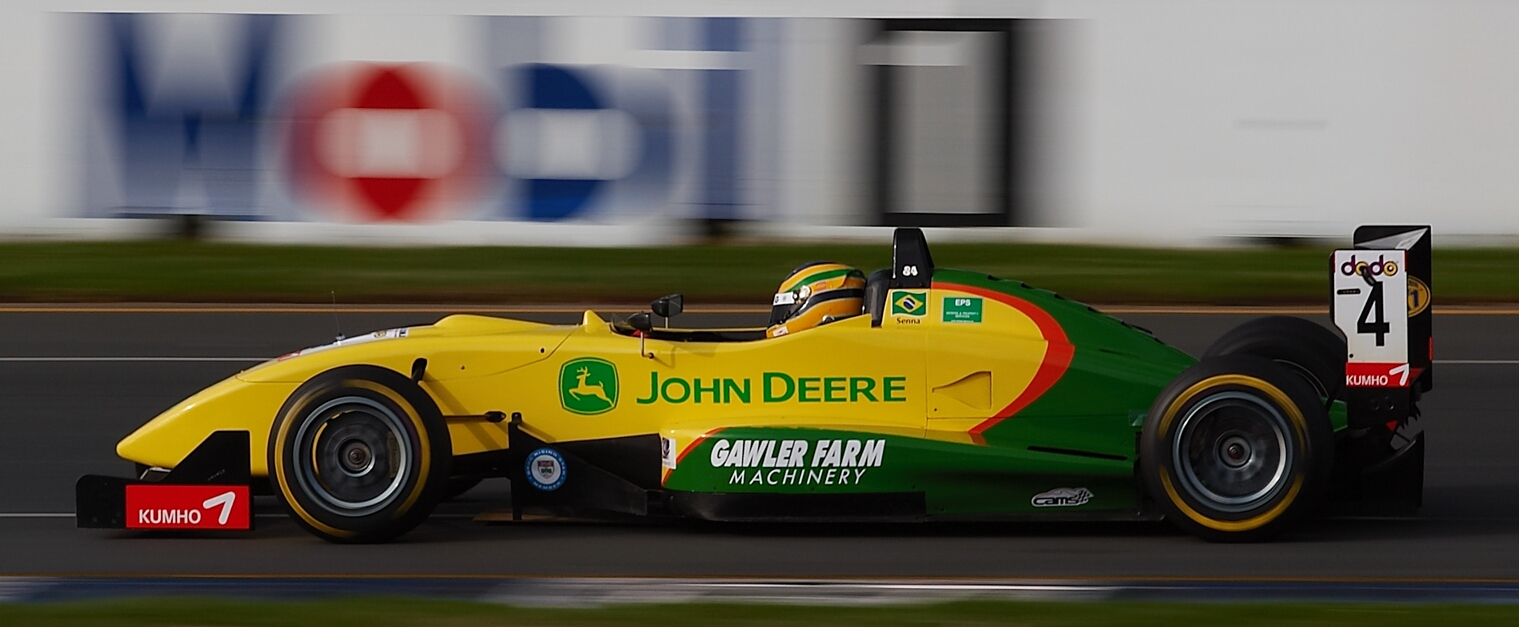
Bruno Senna driving a Dallara F304 in a support race at the 2006 Australian Grand Prix

Senna had a massive crash during the first race of round five of the series at Snetterton. On lap 2, he and Hitech Racing's Salvador Durán clashed wheels on the Revett Straight at nearly 150 mph (240 km/h). Senna's car took off just before the bridge and may have even clipped it, while cartwheeling through the air. His car landed violently and careered along and down the safety barrier for some distance, but Senna walked away. His car, however, was damaged beyond immediate repair and Senna missed out on the second race of the day. On the rear wing of the car he had advertised his uncle's foundation.

In 2006, Senna competed in the Formula Three support races at the 2006 Australian Grand Prix, winning three of the four races. Driving a Spiess Opel powered Dallara F304, Senna set the Formula Three lap record of 1:50.8640 in the first race of the meeting which as of 2016 remains the fastest ever non-F1 lap of the Melbourne Grand Prix Circuit. Senna finished third in the race, the only one of the four races he did not win over the weekend.

On 28 May, Senna made his first appearance on the Monaco circuit, as a guest in the Porsche Supercup event. Unfortunately, he was forced to retire at the first corner because of a clutch failure.

In October 2006, Senna appeared in an eight-part weekly series called Vroom Vroom on British TV station Sky One. Each week, he would drive a different car being tested on the show, as quickly as possible, to the top of a multi-storey car park.

=== GP2 Series (2007–2008) ===
In October 2006, Senna was said to be targeting a seat on the Formula One grid by 2009. He signed to drive for the Red Bull-sponsored Arden International team for the 2007 GP2 Series. He finished fourth on his debut at Bahrain and soon after scored his first win in the feature race in Spain. In the single-race Monaco event, Senna struggled owing to poor tyres.

During the four-week break in the GP2 series between the Monaco and French races, Senna took part in the third round of the Ferrari Challenge Trofeo Pirelli European series at Silverstone on 9 and 10 June 2007. Driving an F430 on a weekend devoted to the 60th anniversary of Ferrari, Senna won both races, starting each from pole. The purpose of this involvement was to gain a better understanding of the circuit, which is on the GP2 calendar.

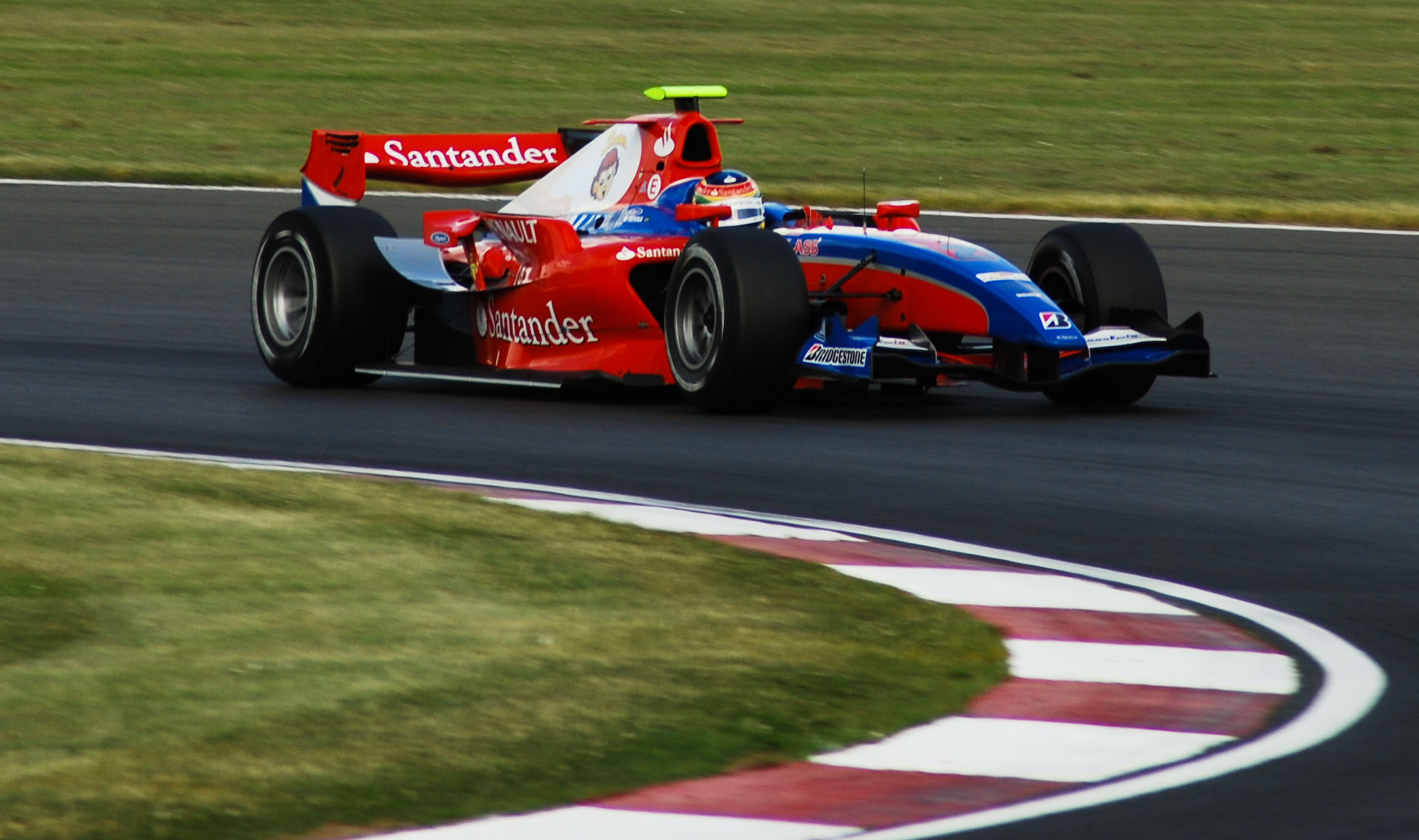
Senna driving for iSport International at the Silverstone round of the 2008 GP2 Series

At Silverstone, a mistake during qualifying on the Friday meant Senna started 26th and last. After a great start, Senna was able to finish 11th in the feature race. The sprint race was not any better in terms of points, with a tenth-place finish. A poor qualifying session at the Nurburgring for the feature race meant Senna started 16th but was up to ninth after a cleverly timed first pit stop. However, he was given a drive-through penalty after being involved in a collision with Adam Carroll and ended up finishing a poor 15th. The Sprint race ended on the first lap after a collision. In Hungary, for both races, Senna finished out of the top ten after struggling with the set-up of the car. The feature race in Turkey brought another poor result; however, Senna finished sixth in the sprint race and with it came his first points since France. At Monza, Senna finished fourth after starting fourteenth. Starting fifth for the sprint race, Senna had an excellent start by moving up to second; however, after contact with Luca Filippi resulted in bent steering, Senna managed to finish third and on the podium for the first time since France in July. At Spa, Senna showed raw pace through practice and set the third fastest time early on during qualifying for the feature race. However, a stall on the grid meant he started 22nd, and while fighting to make up ground, he got a bit of oversteer and then the camber changed, ending his day in the tyre barrier. Starting at the back of the grid for the sprint race, Senna finished eighth, leaving Belgium pointless. At the season finale in Valencia, Spain, Senna ended the feature race with a DNF and thus started the sprint race from 19th, but could only manage to finish 14th. This was a positive season on the whole for Senna, finishing in the top-ten in only his third full year of single-seater racing, with one win and three podiums.

Senna switched teams for the 2008 season, moving to iSport International, where his teammate was Karun Chandhok. He also drove for the team in the 2008 GP2 Asia Series. In the second round of the season at Istanbul, Senna collided with a stray dog during the sprint race. The suspension of Senna's car was damaged in the incident, causing him to retire. Senna himself escaped without injury, while the dog died in the incident. Senna won the GP2 Feature race at Monte Carlo, the first time in 15 years since the Senna name has shown at the top of the leaderboards at the principality. It also moved Senna to first position in the points table, although he was to eventually finish runner-up in the championship to Giorgio Pantano.

=== Le Mans Series (2009) ===
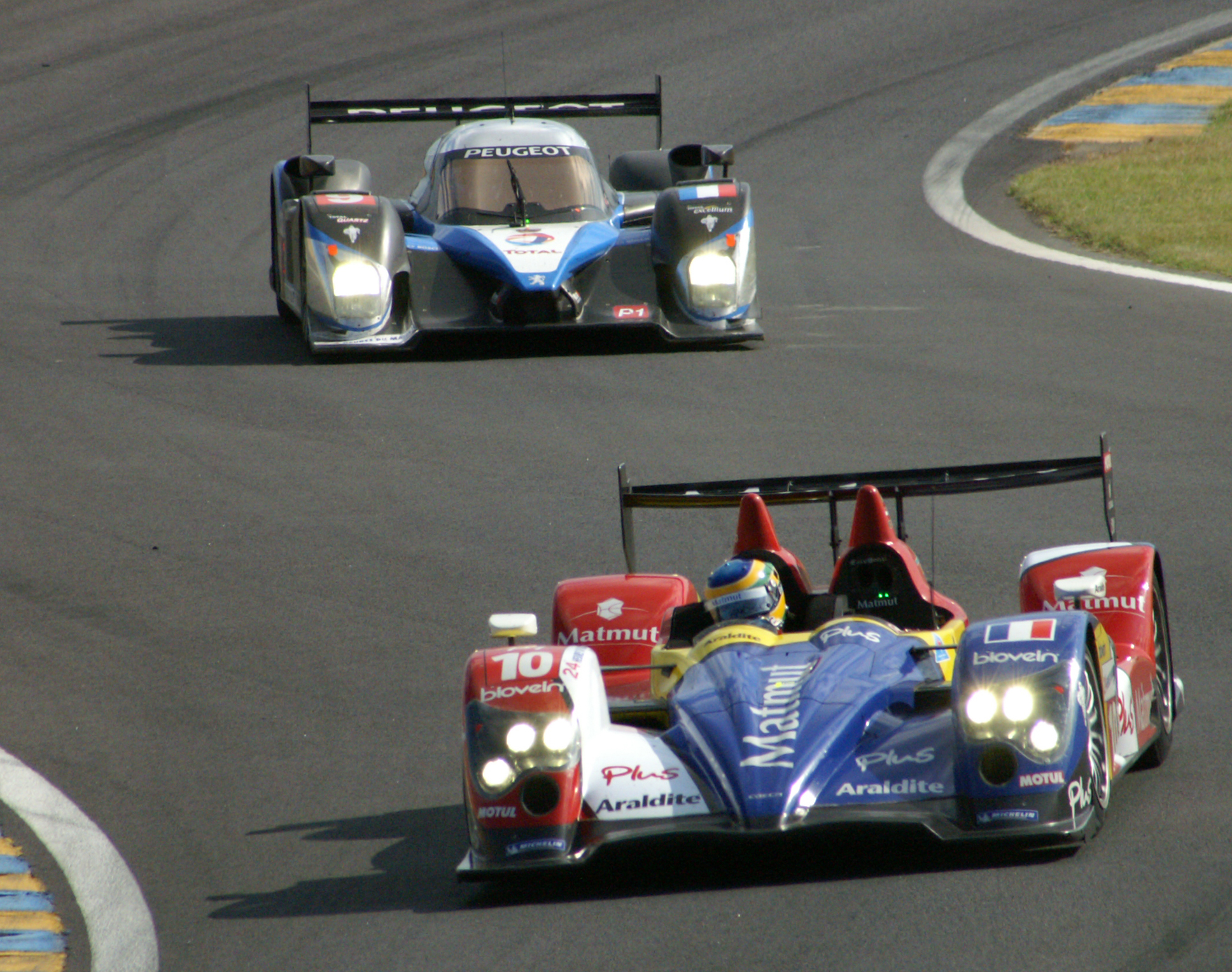
Senna driving for Oreca at the 2009 24 Hours of Le Mans

Senna had been holding out for a Formula One drive for 2009, and after he realised this would not happen, he began looking at other opportunities to keep him "race fit" ahead of negotiations for a 2010 drive in Formula One. He tested with the Mercedes-AMG DTM team, but after holding talks with the outfit he decided he did not want to commit himself to the series.

After testing an Oreca LMP1 car, Senna joined the team to race the 24 Hours of Le Mans and the Le Mans Series. His first race was the 2009 1000 km of Catalunya, teamed with Stéphane Ortelli, finishing third.

=== Formula One ===
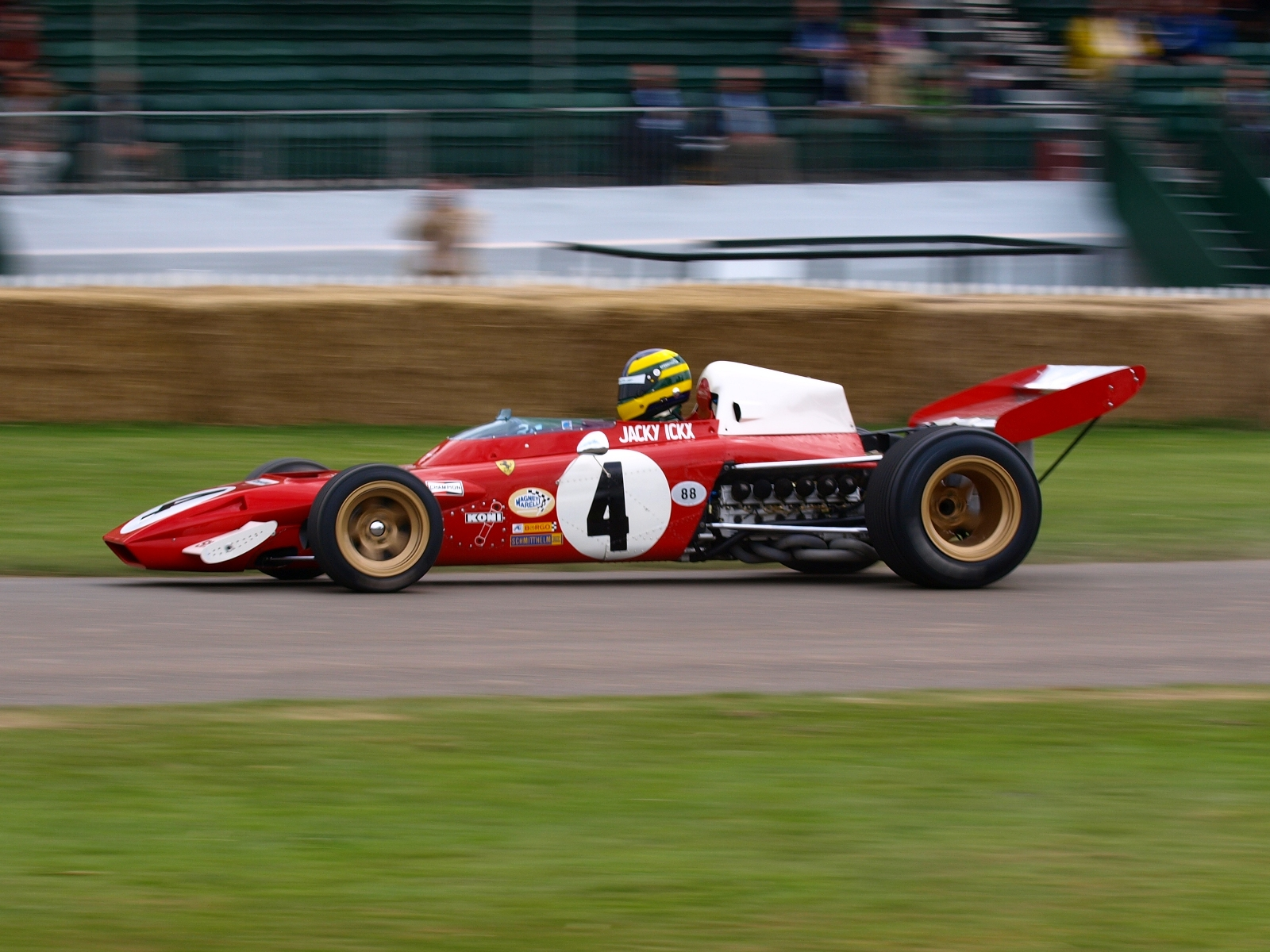
Senna demonstrating a Ferrari 312B2 Formula One car at the 2008 Goodwood Festival of Speed

Senna sampled a contemporary Formula One car for the first time in November 2008 when he tested for Honda in Barcelona. Honda assessed the Brazilian during their first winter test at the Circuit de Catalunya on 17–19 November. His tasks included an initial familiarisation with Honda's RA108 car and its systems before progressing to a full programme during which the team intended to evaluate his performance, technical skill and ability to work within a large team organisation.

Despite Senna, over the course of the three-day test, coming to within 0.3 seconds of then Honda F1 racing driver Jenson Button, the later announcement that Honda would withdraw from Formula One with immediate effect amid the economic crisis appeared to have significantly lessened his opportunity of a 2009 race seat in Formula One, unless the squad were to find a buyer before the beginning of the season in March. Senna was expected to be the team's second driver were it to make the 2009 grid, until Rubens Barrichello was reported to have re-signed with the team. Senna decided not to sign with Mercedes for the 2009 Deutsche Tourenwagen Masters season "to focus completely on his Formula One chances". Bruno Senna said to the BBC in an interview that he did not want to negotiate with Lotus because of sentimental reasons as his uncle Ayrton Senna took his first win with Team Lotus. He also told the BBC that "I felt important to enter F1 now otherwise I would never be in it". He also told the BBC he had been negotiating with Manor GP, Campos Meta and one existing outfit rumoured to be Brawn GP as he was close to securing a drive the previous season but Barrichello renewed his contract with Brawn. Rubens Barrichello admitted he was lucky to be driving for Brawn. Barrichello said, "I'm just lucky that at this time F1 has changed a little bit". He also wished Bruno the very best in the future, saying he only had a position as Ross Brawn chose the more experienced person because of the lack of testing time. He also said he was sure, due to Senna's potential, that he would get a drive next season.

==== HRT (2010) ====
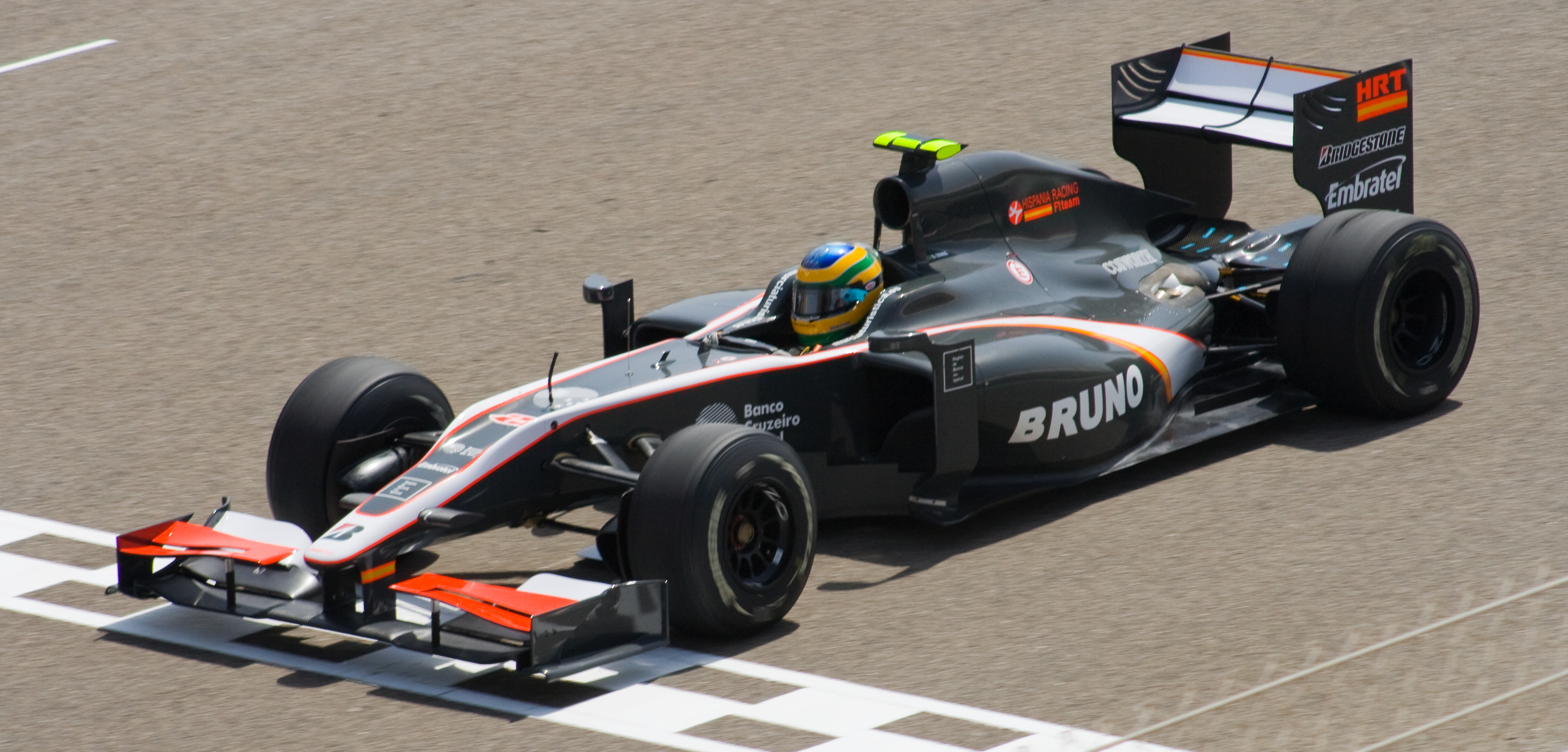
Senna driving for Hispania Racing at the 2010 Bahrain Grand Prix, his Formula One début

On 30 October 2009, Senna announced that he had signed a deal to race in Formula One in 2010; on 31 October 2009, Adrián Campos confirmed that Senna would be driving for Campos Meta. It was unclear whether Senna still had the drive after the takeover of Campos by José Ramón Carabante, with new team principal Colin Kolles saying the new-look team would need to find extra funding, review the existing operation, and announce the driver line up in due course, with no mention of Senna. On 2 March, Campos announced a name change to Hispania Racing. Two days later, Karun Chandhok was confirmed as Senna's teammate.

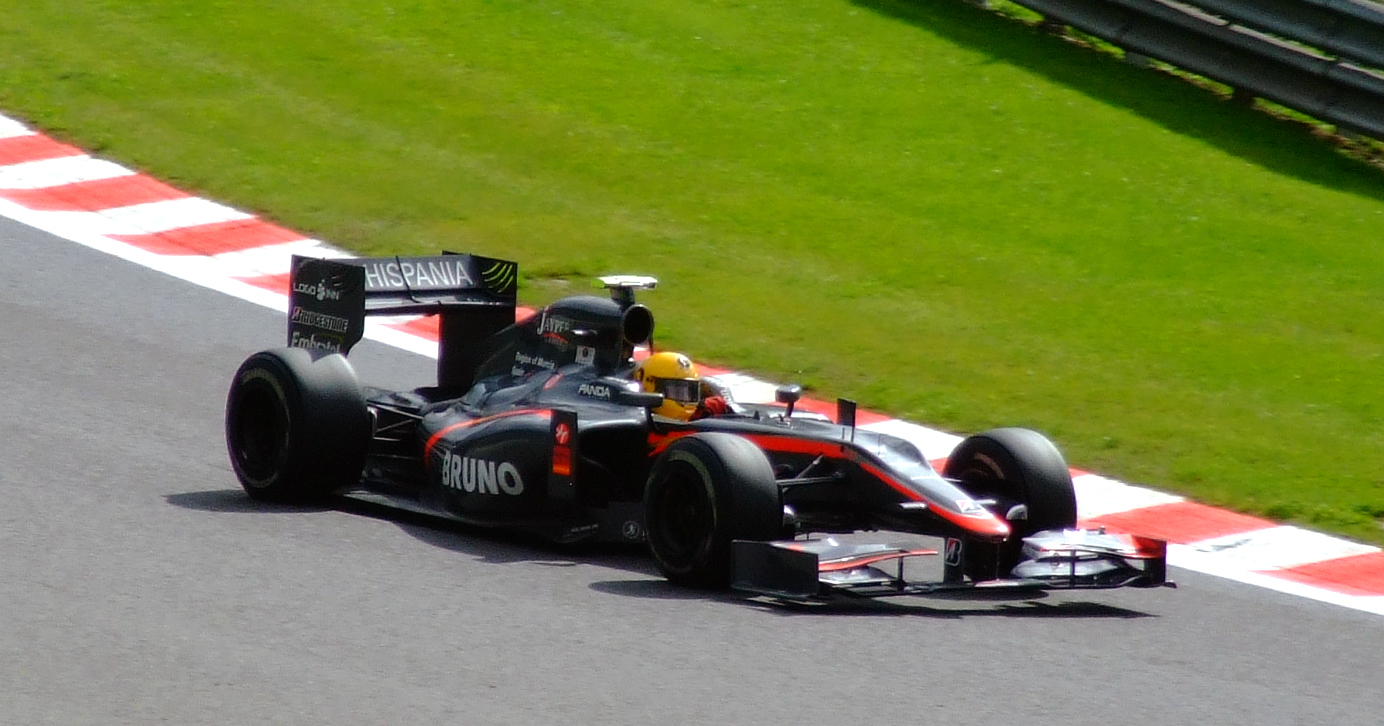
Senna wore a plain yellow helmet at the 2010 Belgian Grand Prix to advertise a competition where fans could design his helmet for his home race later in the year

After nine races, Senna was replaced for the British Grand Prix, with Sakon Yamamoto filling his seat. Senna returned to the driver's seat for the German Grand Prix with Yamamoto replacing Chandhok in the team's other car.

On 7 January 2011, HRT announced that Senna would not drive for them during the 2011 season.

==== Renault (2011) ====
On 31 January 2011, Senna was announced as a test and reserve driver for the Renault team. On 9 February, the team confirmed that Senna would be sharing testing duties with Nick Heidfeld on the Saturday and Sunday of the four-day test at Jerez. This was to evaluate the drivers in preparation for replacing the injured Robert Kubica for the 2011 season. Heidfeld was given the race seat on 16 February 2011. On 24 July 2011, after the conclusion of the German Grand Prix, it was confirmed that Senna would make his first appearance of the 2011 season, replacing Heidfeld in the first free-practice session at the Hungarian Grand Prix.

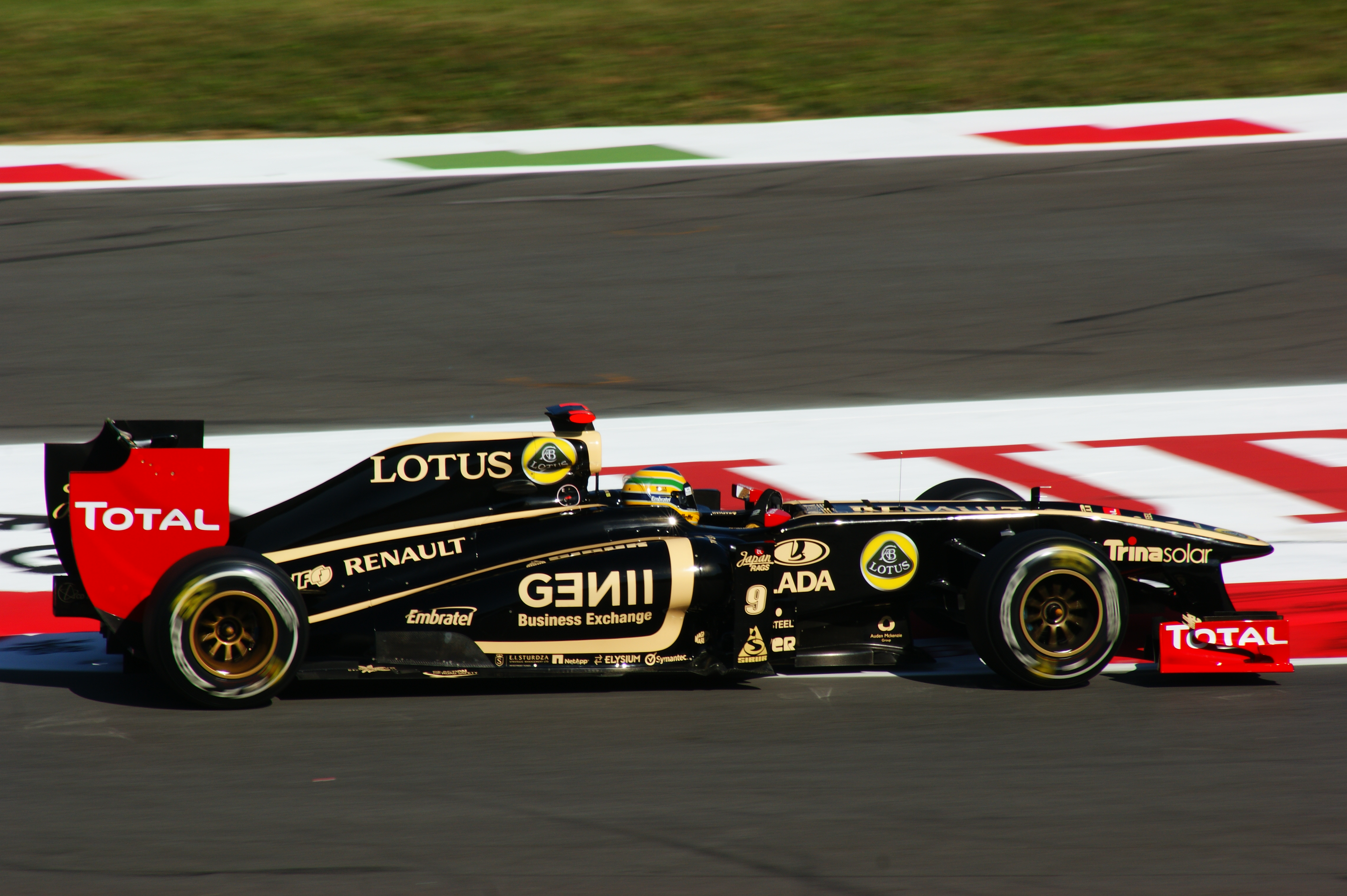
Senna scored his first Formula One points for Renault at the 2011 Italian Grand Prix.

On 22 August, Eddie Jordan reported that Senna would replace Nick Heidfeld for the remaining races of the 2011 season. On 24 August, this was confirmed by Renault. He qualified seventh for his first race with the team, the Belgian Grand Prix, and finished 13th after colliding with Jaime Alguersuari at the first corner, for which Senna received a drive-through penalty. He finished ninth at the Italian Grand Prix, scoring his first Formula One points. In Singapore, the Renault cars struggled with grip on the slow street circuit, with Senna qualifying and finishing 15th, ahead of teammate Petrov. Senna finished 16th in Japan, 13th in Korea, and 12th in the first Indian Grand Prix, after being forced to change tyres late in the race. In Abu Dhabi, Senna again finished 16th after receiving a drive-through penalty for ignoring blue flags, and suffering a KERS failure. In the final race of the season, his home race in Brazil, Senna outqualified Petrov for the third time, by starting ninth on the grid. On lap 10 of the race, Senna was involved in a collision with Michael Schumacher, for which Senna received a drive-through penalty, and finished the race in 17th place.

On 9 December, it was announced that Romain Grosjean would partner Kimi Räikkönen at the team in 2012, leaving Senna without a drive.

==== Williams (2012) ====
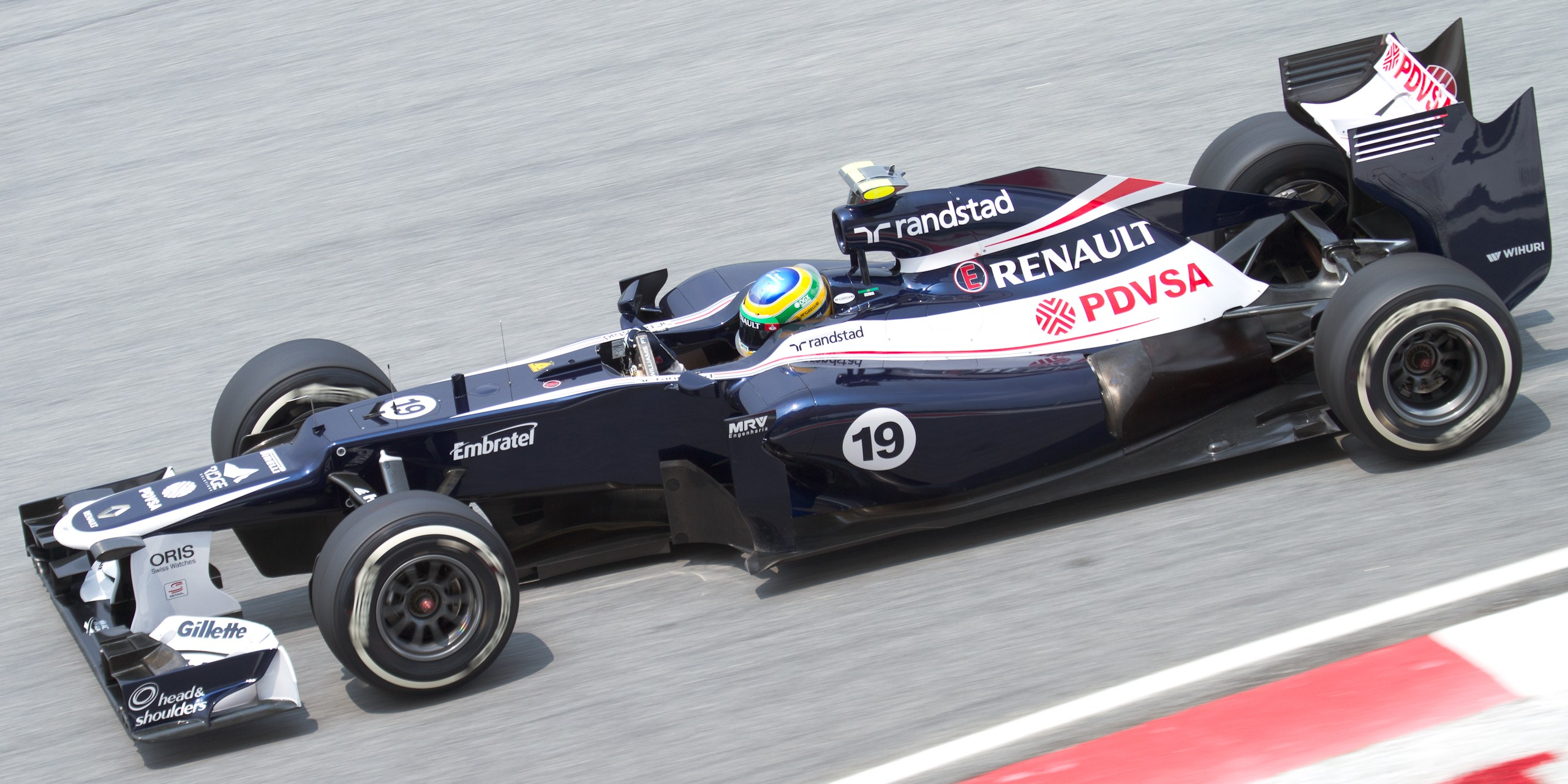
Senna driving for Williams at the 2012 Malaysian Grand Prix.

On 17 January 2012, Senna was confirmed as a Williams driver, where he was partnered by Venezuelan Pastor Maldonado. As his uncle had been racing for Williams at the time of his death, Senna first sought out his family's blessing before joining the team. Senna qualified 14th for the Australian Grand Prix, and retired in the race's closing stages after contact with Felipe Massa; both drivers later agreed that it was a racing incident. He was classified 16th, having completed around 90% of the race distance. On 25 March, Senna scored his first points for Williams at the Malaysian Grand Prix, finishing in sixth place, for which he earned eight points after coming through the field in changeable conditions. Senna's result in Sepang gained more points for the team than Williams had earned throughout the whole of the 2011 season. Senna finished seventh in China and classified 22nd in Bahrain after retiring due to brake issues. Three races later, Maldonado won his first Grand Prix in Spain as Senna retired in a collision with Michael Schumacher. After the race, a fire broke out in the Williams garage. Senna's car was damaged, and four crew members were treated for injuries.

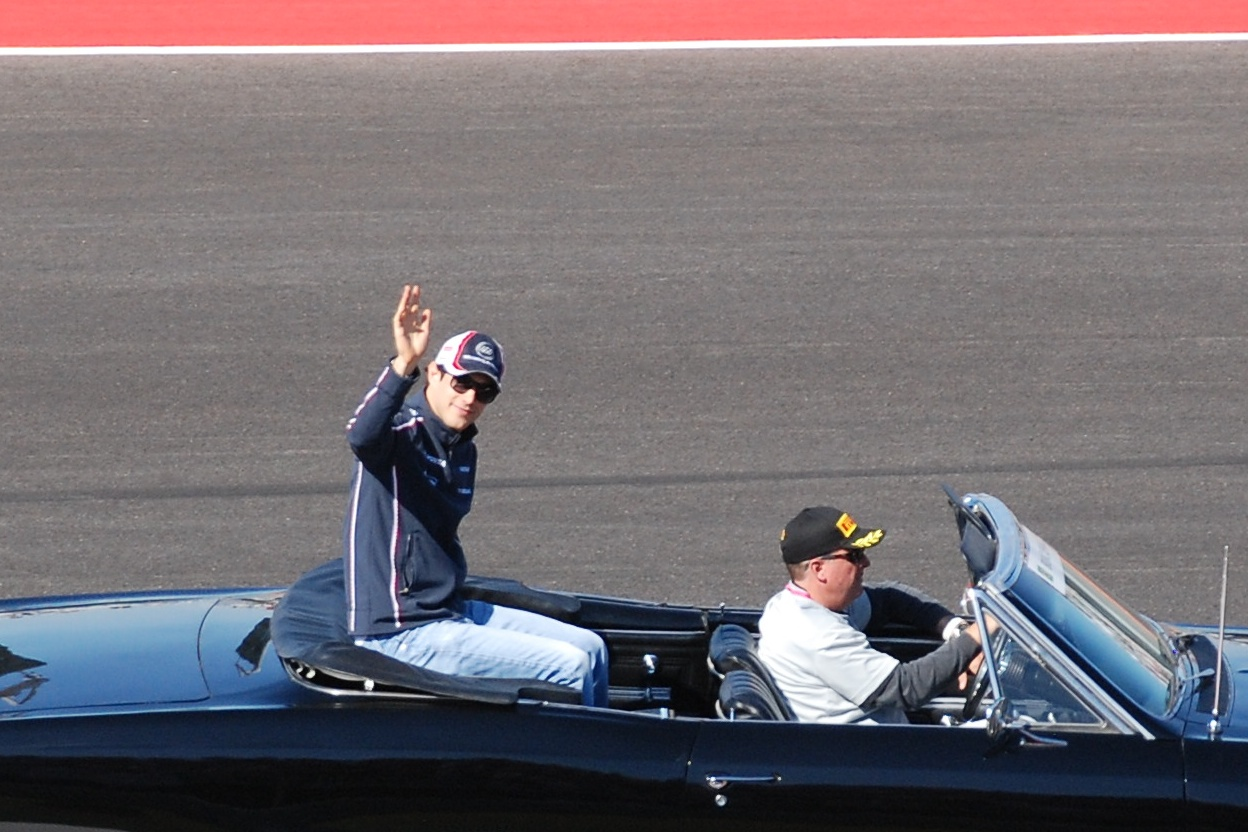
Senna at the 2012 United States Grand Prix

Senna finished 10th in Monaco, and 17th in Canada. In the European Grand Prix, he picked up a drive through penalty after a collision with Kamui Kobayashi; the damage and penalty dropped Senna to 22nd and last, and he finished the race in 11th, promoted to tenth after Maldonado was given a 20-second time penalty following a collision with Lewis Hamilton. In Britain, Senna qualified 15th after he had to slow in his last lap as Romain Grosjean spun in the last corner. He started 13th after grid penalties and after a strong start finished the race in ninth. At the 2012 Belgian Grand Prix, Senna scored the first fastest lap of his career after a late puncture dropped him from eighth place to 12th place. Senna finished the season 16th in the Championship on 31 points and was dropped by Williams for 2013 in favour of Finnish rookie Valtteri Bottas on 28 November 2012.

=== FIA World Endurance Championship and Le Mans return ===
==== Aston Martin (2013–2014) ====
On 5 February 2013, it was confirmed that Senna would be racing for Aston Martin Racing in the FIA World Endurance Championship and the 24 Hours of Le Mans in 2013.

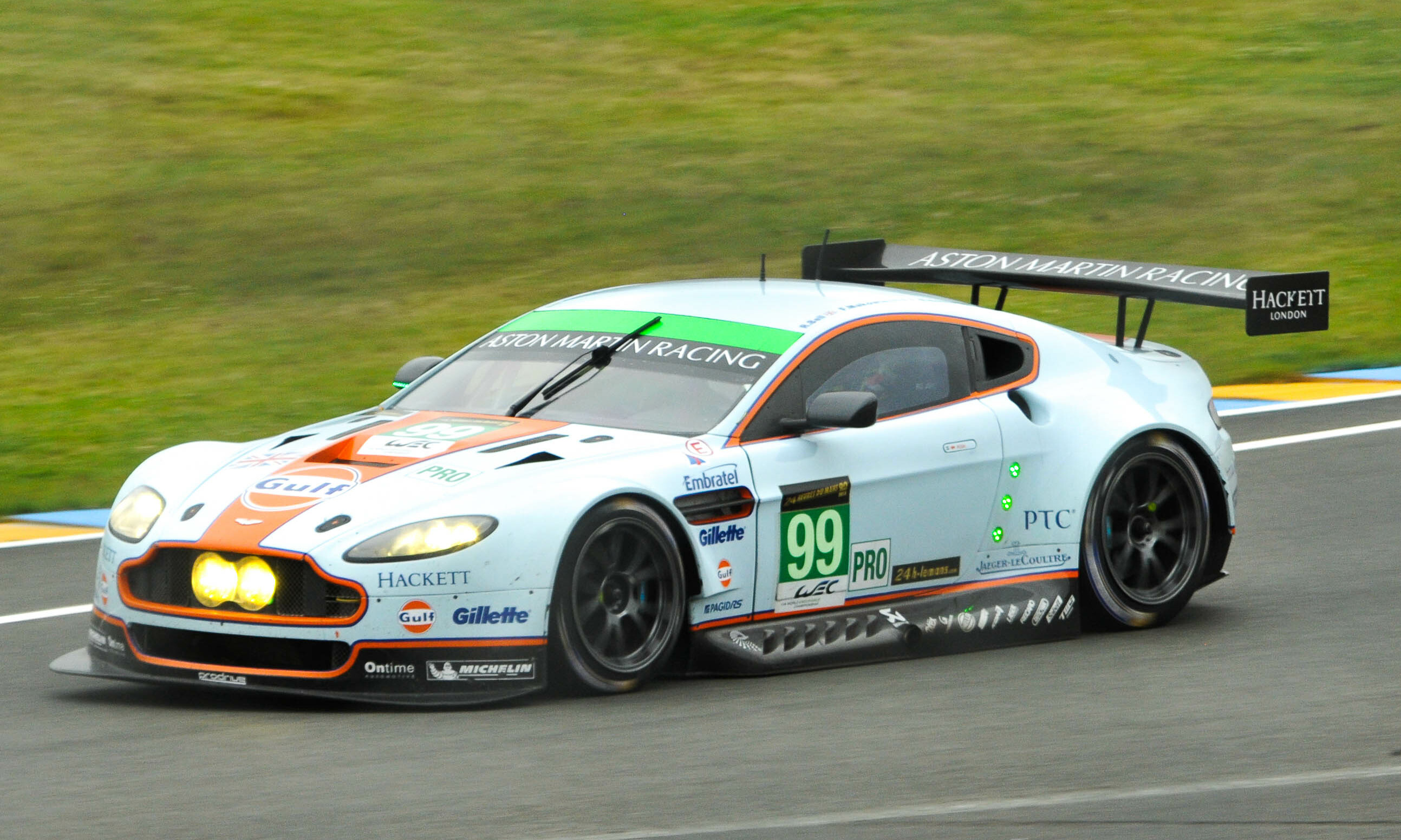
The #99 Aston Martin Vantage GT2 belonging to Senna, Bell, and Makowiecki at the 2013 24 Hours of Le Mans

Senna and his co-drivers had a successful start to the championship, winning at Silverstone and then collecting another podium at Spa. At Le Mans, the Aston Martin Vantage GT2 No. 99 driven by Senna, Rob Bell and Frédéric Makowiecki started from pole position in the GTE class but did not finish the race after serious crash with five hours to the end, when running third. Makowiecki had no major injuries from the accident. In Brazil at São Paulo, there was contact with other cars just in front of Senna resulting in Senna making contact with one of the cars causing suspension damage that forced him to retire from the race.

==== McLaren (2015–) ====
On 9 February 2015, it was confirmed that Senna would be a factory driver for the McLaren GT3 project.

Rebellion Racing (2017–2020)

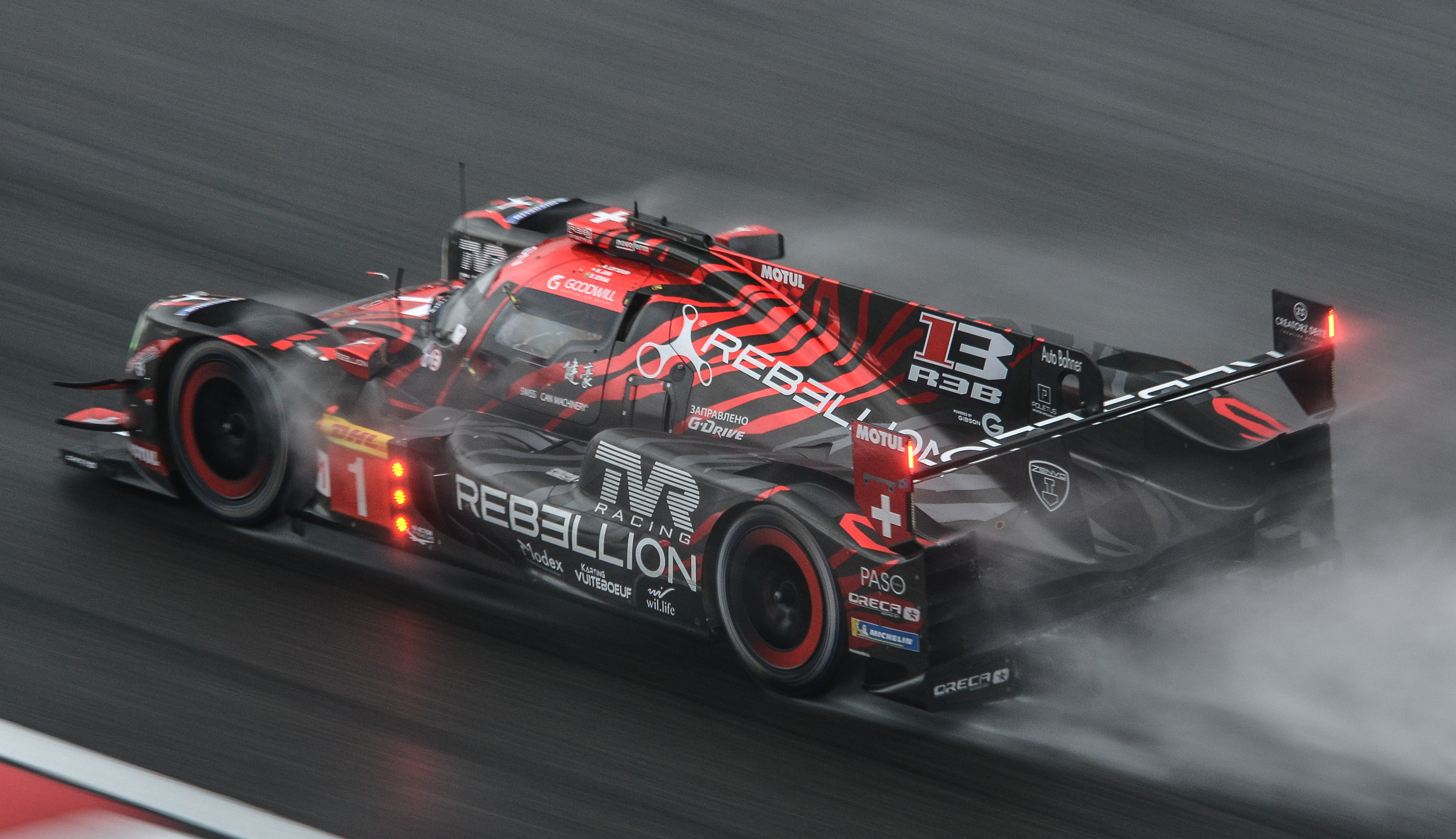
The #1 Rebellion R18 belonging to Senna, Andre Lotterer, and Neel Jani at the 2018 6 Hours of Shanghai

For 2017, Senna joined the Swiss-flagged Vaillante Rebellion Racing. Driving the number 13 car in the LMP2 class, Senna and his teammate Julien Canal won the world championship. The LMP2 championship came down to the last race of the season. That final, the 6 Hours of Bahrain, saw Rebellion's No. 13 (driven by Julien Canal, Senna, and Nico Prost) and rivals Jackie Chan DC Racing both within one race of clenching the season title. After trailing to their rivals for much of the race, the Rebellion No. 13 car took the lead. However, with Senna at the wheel, the car suffered a loss of power steering during the final stint. Despite the power steering failure, Senna muscled through for the final 50 minutes of the race to win the race and the championship.

=== Formula E (2014–2016) ===
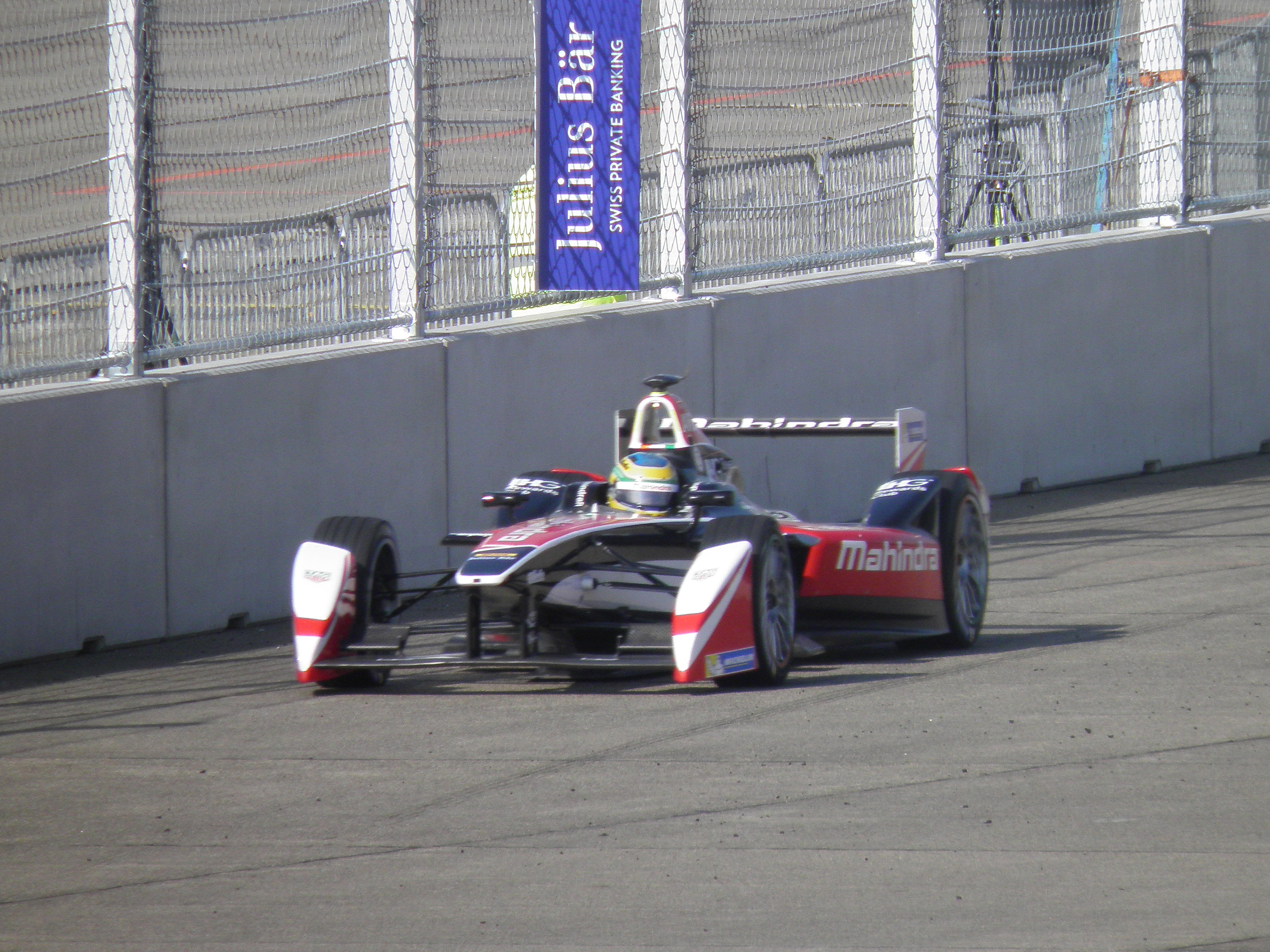
Senna competing for Mahindra Racing at the 2015 Berlin ePrix.

On 26 May 2014, Mahindra Racing confirmed Karun Chandhok and Senna as their Formula E drivers for the 2014–15 season. Senna remained with the team for the 2015–16 season. He did not re-sign ahead of the 2016–17 season and left the series.

=== Airspeeder (2022–) ===
On 10 March 2022, electric vertical take-off and landing (eVTOL) racing series Airspeeder confirmed Senna as a development pilot and global ambassador. Senna will play a major role in developing the sport as it moves towards the first crewed Airspeeder Grand Prix's in 2023 working with the company’s leading team of engineers on developing onboard safety technology.

=== Television punditry ===
On 7 March 2014, Senna was added to Sky Sports F1's line-up for seven races: Malaysia, China, Hungary, Singapore, Russia, USA and Brazil. Senna also commentated during practice sessions alongside David Croft, as well as providing race analysis on the presentation day throughout the seven Grand Prix weekends.

Senna also made guest appearances on The F1 Show and operated the Skypad.

On 8 March 2016, Senna was announced as part of Channel 4's Formula One coverage, appearing in special features throughout the season.

== Awards ==
On 15 July 2012, Senna collected the Lorenzo Bandini Trophy in Brisighella, Italy. He was the 19th driver to collect the award.

== Helmet design ==
Senna's helmet is a modified version of his uncle's helmet design: a yellow helmet with a green and a blue S-shaped stripe. The green stripe has a blue-and-white outline, while the blue stripe has a green-and-white outline. There is a green stripe under the chin area and a blue rounded rectangle in the top area.

== Personal life ==
Senna dated Ramóna Kiss, a Hungarian TV presenter and actress, in 2011.

== Racing record ==
=== Career summary ===
Season	Series	Team	Races	Wins	Poles	F/Laps	Podiums	Points	Position
2004	Asian Formula Renault Challenge	Shangsai FRD GT Tires Team	1	0	0	?	1	N/A	NC^{†}
2004	Formula BMW UK	Carlin Motorsport	6	0	0	0	0	6	21st
2005	British Formula 3 International Series	Räikkönen Robertson Racing	21	0	1	0	3	75	10th
2005	Masters of Formula 3	Räikkönen Robertson Racing	1	0	0	0	0	N/A	NC
2005	Macau Grand Prix	Räikkönen Robertson Racing	1	0	0	0	0	N/A	NC
2006	British Formula 3 International Series	Räikkönen Robertson Racing	22	5	3	5	9	229	**3rd**
2006	Masters of Formula 3	Räikkönen Robertson Racing	1	0	0	0	0	N/A	7th
2006	Formula 3 Australian Grand Prix	Bronte Rundle Motorsport	3	2	0	?	3	N/A	**1st**
2006	Porsche Carrera Cup Germany	EMC Buchbinder ARAXA Racing	1	0	0	0	0	N/A	NC^{†}
2006	Porsche Supercup	Porsche AG	1	0	0	0	0	N/A	NC^{†}
2007	GP2 Series	Arden International	21	1	0	0	3	34	8th
2007	Ferrari Challenge Europe - Trofeo Pirelli	Ferrari GB Dealer Team	2	2	2	?	2	N/A	NC^{†}
2007	Macau Grand Prix	Räikkönen Robertson Racing	1	0	0	0	0	N/A	NC
2008	GP2 Series	iSport International	20	2	3	0	6	64	**2nd**
2008	GP2 Asia Series	iSport International	9	0	0	4	2	23	5th
2008	Formula One	Honda Racing F1 Team	Test driver						
2009	Le Mans Series	Team Oreca Matmut - AIM	3	0	0	0	2	12	8th
2009	24 Hours of Le Mans	Team Oreca Matmut - AIM	1	0	0	0	0	N/A	NC
2010	Formula One	Hispania Racing F1 Team	18	0	0	0	0	0	23rd
2011	Formula One	Lotus Renault GP	8	0	0	0	0	2	18th
2012	Formula One	Williams F1 Team	20	0	0	1	0	31	16th
2013	FIA World Endurance Championship - LMGTE Pro	Aston Martin Racing	8	2	3	1	4	94	8th
2013	FIA World Endurance Championship - LMGTE Am	Aston Martin Racing	1	1	1	0	1	13.5	23rd
2013	American Le Mans Series	Aston Martin Racing	1	0	0	0	0	0	NC^{†}
2013	24 Hours of Le Mans - LMGTE Pro	Aston Martin Racing	1	0	1	0	0	N/A	DNF
2013	Stock Car Brasil	GT Team Raízen	1	0	0	0	0	0	NC^{†}
2013	Blancpain Endurance Series	Von Ryan Racing	1	0	0	0	0	4	31st
2014	FIA World Endurance Championship - LMGTE Pro	Aston Martin Racing	2	0	0	0	0	14	22nd
2014	24 Hours of Le Mans - LMGTE Pro	Aston Martin Racing	1	0	0	0	0	N/A	6th
2014	Stock Car Brasil	Prati-Donaduzzi	1	0	0	0	0	0	NC^{†}
2014–15	Formula E	Mahindra Racing	11	0	0	0	0	40	10th
2015	Blancpain Endurance Series	Von Ryan Racing	4	0	0	0	0	10	20th
2015	Stock Car Brasil	Prati-Donaduzzi	1	0	0	0	0	0	NC^{†}
2015–16	Formula E	Mahindra Racing	10	0	0	1	1	52	11th
2016	FIA World Endurance Championship - LMP2	RGR Sport by Morand	9	2	1	1	7	166	**2nd**
2016	24 Hours of Le Mans - LMP2	RGR Sport by Morand	1	0	0	0	0	N/A	10th
2016	Blancpain GT Series Endurance Cup	Garage 59	1	0	0	0	0	0	NC
2016	Intercontinental GT Challenge	Garage 59	1	0	0	0	0	1	17th
2017	FIA World Endurance Championship - LMP2	Vaillante Rebellion	9	4	1	2	8	186	**1st**
2017	24 Hours of Le Mans - LMP2	Vaillante Rebellion	1	0	0	0	0	N/A	14th
2017	WeatherTech SportsCar Championship - Prototype	Tequila Patrón ESM	4	0	0	0	0	97	17th
2018	WeatherTech SportsCar Championship - Prototype	United Autosports	2	0	0	0	0	56	33rd
2018	European Le Mans Series - LMP2	United Autosports	1	0	0	0	0	0.5	32nd
2018	24 Hours of Le Mans	Rebellion Racing	1	0	0	0	0	N/A	4th
2018–19	FIA World Endurance Championship	Rebellion Racing	7	0	0	0	1	73	7th
2019	European Le Mans Series - LMP2	RLR MSport	5	0	0	0	0	5.5	21st
2019	24 Hours of Le Mans	Rebellion Racing	1	0	0	0	0	N/A	4th
2019–20	FIA World Endurance Championship	Rebellion Racing	7	2	4	1	6	145	**3rd**
2020	24 Hours of Le Mans	Rebellion Racing	1	0	0	1	1	N/A	**2nd**

^{†} As Senna was a guest driver, he was ineligible to score points.

=== Complete Formula BMW UK results ===
(key) (Races in bold indicate pole position; races in italics indicate fastest lap)

Year	Entrant	1	2	3	4	5	6	7	8	9	10	11	12	13	14	15	16	17	18	19	20	DC	Points
2004	Carlin Motorsport	THR; 1	THR; 2	BRH1; 1	BRH1; 2	SIL; 1	SIL; 2	OUL; 1	OUL; 2	MON; 1	MON; 2	CRO; 1	CRO; 2	KNO; 1	KNO; 2	BRH2; 1 Ret	BRH2; 2; 16	ROC; 1; 13	ROC; 2 Ret	DON; 1; 6	DON; 2; 16	21st	6

=== Complete British Formula Three Championship results ===
(key) (Races in bold indicate pole position; races in italics indicate fastest lap)

Year	Entrant	1	2	3	4	5	6	7	8	9	10	11	12	13	14	15	16	17	18	19	20	21	22	23	24	DC	Points
2005	Räikkönen Robertson Racing	DON; 1; 6	DON; 2 Ret	SPA; 1 C	SPA; 2 C	CRO; 1 Ret	CRO; 2; 5	KNO; 1; 14	KNO; 2 DNS	THR; 1; 11	THR; 2 Ret	CAS; 1; 12	CAS; 2; 10	MNZ; 1 Ret	MNZ; 2; 6	MNZ; 3; 5	SIL1; 1 Ret	SIL1; 2 Ret	SIL1; 3; 3	NÜR; 1 Ret	**NÜR**; **2**; 2	MON; 1; 12	MON; 2; 14	SIL2; 1 Ret	SIL2; 2; 2	10th	75
2006	Räikkönen Robertson Racing	**OUL**; **1**; 1	OUL; 2; 1	DON; 1; 1	DON; 2; 4	PAU; 1; 11	PAU; 2; 10	**MON**; **1**; 1	MON; 2; 5	SNE; 1 Ret	SNE; 2 DNS	SPA; 1; 3	SPA; 2; 3	**SIL1**; **1**; 2	SIL1; 2; 8	BRH; 1; 7	BRH; 2; 5	MUG; 1; 10	MUG; 2; 1	SIL2; 1; 4	SIL2; 2; 2	THR; 1; 4	THR; 2; 6			3rd	229

=== Complete GP2 Series results ===
(key) (Races in bold indicate pole position; races in italics indicate fastest lap)

Year	Entrant	1	2	3	4	5	6	7	8	9	10	11	12	13	14	15	16	17	18	19	20	21	DC	Points
2007	Arden International	BHR; FEA; 4	BHR; SPR; 8	CAT; FEA; 1	CAT; SPR; 4	MON; FEA; 11	MAG; FEA; 3	MAG; SPR; 7	SIL; FEA; 11	SIL; SPR; 10	NÜR; FEA; 15	NÜR; SPR; Ret	HUN; FEA; 13	HUN; SPR; 12	IST; FEA; 10	IST; SPR; 6	MNZ; FEA; 4	MNZ; SPR; 3	SPA; FEA; Ret	SPA; SPR; 8	VAL; FEA; Ret	VAL; SPR; 14	8th	34
2008	iSport International	CAT; FEA; 2	CAT; SPR; 4	IST; FEA; 15	IST; SPR; Ret	MON; FEA; 1	MON; SPR; 5	**MAG**; **FEA**; Ret	MAG; SPR; 5	**SIL**; **FEA**; 6	SIL; SPR; 1	HOC; FEA; 4	HOC; SPR; 3	HUN; FEA; 3	HUN; SPR; 3	VAL; FEA; 9	VAL; SPR; Ret	**SPA**; **FEA**; 11	SPA; SPR; Ret	MNZ; FEA; 5	MNZ; SPR; 9		2nd	64

==== Complete GP2 Asia Series results ====
(key) (Races in italics indicate fastest lap)

Year	Entrant	1	2	3	4	5	6	7	8	9	10	DC	Points
2008	iSport International	DUB1; FEA; 2	DUB1; SPR; 19	SEN; FEA; 7	SEN; SPR; 2	SEP; FEA; Ret	SEP; SPR; 8	BHR; FEA; 4	BHR; SPR; DNS	DUB2; FEA; DSQ	DUB2; SPR; 11	5th	23

=== Complete European Le Mans Series results ===
Year	Entrant	Class	Chassis	Engine	1	2	3	4	5	6	Rank	Points
2009	Team Oreca-Matmut AIM	LMP1	Courage-Oreca LC70E	AIM YS5.5 5.5 L V10	CAT; 3						16th	12
2009	Team Oreca-Matmut AIM	LMP1	Oreca 01	AIM YS5.5 5.5 L V10		SPA; Ret	ALG; 3	NÜR	SIL		16th	12
2018	United Autosports	LMP2	Ligier JS P217	Gibson GK428 4.2 L V8	LEC; 12	MNZ	RBR	SIL	SPA	ALG	32nd	0.5
2019	RLR MSport	LMP2	Oreca 07	Gibson GK428 4.2 L V8	LEC; 8	MNZ; Ret	CAT; 13	SIL	SPA; 14	ALG; 15	21st	5.5

=== Complete 24 Hours of Le Mans results ===
Year	Team	Co-Drivers	Car	Class	Laps	Pos.	Class Pos.
2009	(France) Team Oreca-Matmut AIM	(Monaco) Stéphane Ortelli (Portugal) Tiago Monteiro	Oreca 01-AIM	LMP1	219	DNF	DNF
2013	(United Kingdom) Aston Martin Racing	(France) Frédéric Makowiecki (United Kingdom) Rob Bell	Aston Martin Vantage GTE	GTE; Pro	252	DNF	DNF
2014	(United Kingdom) Aston Martin Racing	(United Kingdom) Darren Turner (Germany) Stefan Mücke	Aston Martin Vantage GTE	GTE; Pro	310	35th	6th
2016	(Mexico) RGR Sport by Morand	(Portugal) Filipe Albuquerque (Mexico) Ricardo González	Ligier JS P2-Nissan	LMP2	344	14th	10th
2017	(Switzerland) Vaillante Rebellion	(France) Nicolas Prost (France) Julien Canal	Oreca 07-Gibson	LMP2	340	16th	14th
2018	(Switzerland) Rebellion Racing	(Switzerland) Neel Jani (Germany) André Lotterer	Rebellion R13-Gibson	LMP1	375	4th	4th
2019	(Switzerland) Rebellion Racing	(Switzerland) Neel Jani (Germany) André Lotterer	Rebellion R13-Gibson	LMP1	376	4th	4th
2020	(Switzerland) Rebellion Racing	(France) Norman Nato (United States) Gustavo Menezes	Rebellion R13-Gibson	LMP1	382	**2nd**	**2nd**

=== Complete Formula One results ===
(key) (Races in italics indicate fastest lap)

Year	Entrant	Chassis	Engine	1	2	3	4	5	6	7	8	9	10	11	12	13	14	15	16	17	18	19	20	WDC	Points
2010	Hispania Racing F1 Team	Hispania F110	Cosworth CA2010 2.4 V8	BHR; Ret	AUS; Ret	MAL; 16	CHN; 16	ESP; Ret	MON; Ret	TUR; Ret	CAN; Ret	EUR; 20	GBR	GER; 19	HUN; 17	BEL; Ret	ITA; Ret	SIN; Ret	JPN; 15	KOR; 14	BRA; 21	ABU; 19		23rd	0
2011	Lotus Renault GP	Renault R31	Renault RS27 2.4 V8	AUS	MAL	CHN	TUR	ESP	MON	CAN	EUR	GBR	GER	HUN; TD	BEL; 13	ITA; 9	SIN; 15	JPN; 16	KOR; 13	IND; 12	ABU; 16	BRA; 17		18th	2
2012	Williams F1 Team	Williams FW34	Renault RS27-2012 V8	AUS; 16^{†}	MAL; 6	CHN; 7	BHR; 22^{†}	ESP; Ret	MON; 10	CAN; 17	EUR; 10	GBR; 9	GER; 17	HUN; 7	BEL; 12	ITA; 10	SIN; 18^{†}	JPN; 14	KOR; 15	IND; 10	ABU; 8	USA; 10	BRA; Ret	16th	31

^{†} Did not finish, but was classified as he had completed more than 90% of the race distance.

=== Complete FIA World Endurance Championship results ===
Year	Entrant	Class	Car	Engine	1	2	3	4	5	6	7	8	9	Rank	Points
2013	Aston Martin Racing	LMGTE Pro	Aston Martin Vantage GTE	Aston Martin 4.5 L V8	**SIL**; 1	SPA; 2	**LMS**; Ret	SÃO; Ret	**COA**; 1		SHA; 2	BHR; Ret		8th	94
2013	Aston Martin Racing	LMGTE Am	Aston Martin Vantage GTE	Aston Martin 4.5 L V8						**FUJ**; 1				8th	94
2014	Aston Martin Racing	LMGTE Pro	Aston Martin Vantage GTE	Aston Martin 4.5 L V8	SIL	SPA; 4	LMS; 10	COA	FUJ	SHA	BHR	SÃO		22nd	14
2016	RGR Sport by Morand	LMP2	Ligier JS P2	Nissan VK45DE 4.5 L V8	**SIL**; 1	SPA; 4	LMS; 6	NÜR; 2	**MEX**; 1	COA; 2	FUJ; 2	SHA; 3	BHR; 2	2nd	166
2017	Vaillante Rebellion	LMP2	Oreca 07	Gibson GK428 4.2 L V8	SIL; 2	SPA; 2	LMS; 6	NÜR; 2	MEX; 1	COA; 3	FUJ; 1	**SHA**; 1	BHR; 1	1st	186
2018–19	Rebellion Racing	LMP1	Rebellion R13	Gibson GL458 4.5 L V8	SPA; DSQ	LMS; 4	SIL; WD	FUJ; 3	SHA; 4	SEB; Ret	SPA; 5	LMS; 4		7th	73
2019–20	Rebellion Racing	LMP1	Rebellion R13	Gibson GL458 4.5 L V8	SIL; 9	FUJ; 3	**SHA**; 1	**BHR**; 3	**COA**; 1	**SPA**; 3	LMS; 2	BHR		3rd	145

=== Complete Stock Car Brasil results ===
Year	Team	Car	1	2	3	4	5	6	7	8	9	10	11	12	13	14	15	16	17	18	19	20	21	Rank	Points	Ref
2013	GT Team Raízen	Chevrolet Sonic	INT	CUR	TAR	SAL	BRA	CAS	RBP	BRA	VEL	CUR	GOI	INT; 15										NC†	0†	
2014	Prati-Donaduzzi	Peugeot 408	INT; 1; 21	SCZ; 1	SCZ; 2	BRA; 1	BRA; 2	GOI; 1	GOI; 2	GOI; 1	CAS; 1	CAS; 2	CUR; 1	CUR; 2	VEL; 1	VEL; 2	SCZ; 1	SCZ; 2	TAR; 1	TAR; 2	SAL; 1	SAL; 2	CUR; 1	NC†	0†	
2015	Prati-Donaduzzi	Peugeot 408	GOI; 1; 25	RBP; 1	RBP; 2	VEL; 1	VEL; 2	CUR; 1	CUR; 2	SCZ; 1	SCZ; 2	CUR; 1	CUR; 2	GOI; 1	CAS; 1	CAS; 2	BRA; 1	BRA; 2	CUR; 1	CUR; 2	TAR; 1	TAR; 2	INT; 1	NC†	0†	

^{†} Ineligible for championship points.

=== Complete Formula E results ===
(key) (Races in bold indicate pole position; races in italics indicate fastest lap)

Year	Team	Chassis	Powertrain	1	2	3	4	5	6	7	8	9	10	11	Pos	Points
2014–15	Mahindra Racing	Spark SRT01-e	SRT01-e	BEI; Ret	PUT; 14†	PDE; 6	BUE; 5	MIA; Ret	LBH; 5	MCO; Ret	BER; 17	MSC; 16	LDN; 16	LDN; 4	10th	40
2015–16	Mahindra Racing	Spark SRT01-e	Mahindra M2ELECTRO	BEI; 13	PUT; 5	PDE; Ret	BUE; 10	MEX; 10	LBH; 5	PAR; 9	BER; 15	LDN; 2	LDN; 6		11th	52

^{†} Driver did not finish the race, but was classified as he completed over 75% of the race distance.

=== Complete IMSA SportsCar Championship results ===
Year	Entrant	Class	Chassis	Engine	1	2	3	4	5	6	7	8	9	10	Rank	Points
2017	Tequila Patrón ESM	P	Nissan Onroak DPi	Nissan VR38DETT 3.8 L Turbo V6	DAY; 7	SEB; 10	LBH	COA	DET	WGL; 8	MOS	ELK	LGA	PET; 4	17th	97
2018	United Autosports	P	Ligier JS P217	Gibson GK428 4.2 L V8	DAY; 4	SEB	LBH	MDO	DET	WGL; 4	MOS	ELK	LGA	PET	33rd	56

== Notes and references ==
Sporting positions
Preceded by Nicolas Lapierre; Gustavo Menezes; Stephane Richelmi	FIA Endurance Trophy for LMP2 Drivers; 2017; With: Julien Canal	Succeeded by Nicolas Lapierre; André Negrão; Pierre Thiriet
Awards and achievements
Preceded by Nico Rosberg	Lorenzo Bandini Trophy; 2012	Succeeded by Piero Ferrari
