= Beijing Olympic Green Circuit =

Motorsport circuit in Beijing, China

- Street Circuit (2014–2015)
- Location: Beijing, China
- Coordinates: 39°59′41″N 116°23′7″E
- Opened: September 11, 2014; 11 years ago
- Closed: October 24, 2015; 10 years ago
- Architect: Rodrigo Nunes
- Major events: Formula E Beijing ePrix (2014–2015)

Street Circuit (2014–2015)
- Length: 3.453 km (2.146 mi)
- Turns: 20
- Race lap record: 1:39.993 ( (Switzerland) Sébastien Buemi, Renault Z.E 15, 2015, F-E)

Beijing Olympic Green Circuit was a street circuit in Beijing, China, which was first used on 13 September 2014 during the first ePrix of Formula E. It ran around the grounds of the Olympic Stadium used in the 2008 Summer Olympics. The track featured 20 turns, and at 3.453 km (2.146 mi) was still the longest track currently used in Formula E. Choosing the location and designing the track was done by designer Rodrigo Nunes in close cooperation with the FIA, Formula E, the Federation of Automobile and Motorcycle Sports of PR China, the Olympic Green management, the Mayor of Beijing, the Chinese Government, and event organiser China Racing.

== Driver comments ==
Lucas di Grassi, Audi Sport ABT: "The Beijing track is an amazing facility. For the drivers, it will be a tremendous challenge to learn the limits of this track quickly, as well as to understand the best overtaking opportunities. The most obvious places are likely to be Turns 1, 2, 6, 19 and 20. The circuit will also require much traction and braking stability, while the energy recuperation at braking zones will help to stabilise the car. Also, it will be our first ever race, so all the drivers will be raring to go! The pit lane is also unique and requires some special practice to get right, also because drivers have to switch cars in their pit box."

Katherine Legge, Amlin Aguri: "This is the first chicane, turn 3. (...) Unrealistically tight, I would say. They've had a good first attempt at it, but as these things happen, they do change and I would imagine that this would be a little bit too tight."

== Track changes ==
For the second ePrix, the track layout was lightly modified. The first chicane, previously Turns 3, 4 and 5, has been removed with the second chicane taking a tighter profile than last year. Drivers believe that the modified layout offers increased chances of overtaking.
