= Mahindra Racing =

Indian Formula E team

(India) Mahindra Racing
- Founded: 2014
- Founder(s): K. C. Mahindra, Anand Mahindra
- Base: Banbury, England
- Team principal(s): Frédéric Bertrand
- Current series: Formula E
- Former series: MotoGP
- Current drivers: 21. Nyck de Vries; 48. Edoardo Mortara
- Noted drivers: Karun Chandhok; Bruno Senna; Nick Heidfeld; Alex Lynn; Felix Rosenqvist; Jérôme d'Ambrosio; Pascal Wehrlein; Alexander Sims (United Kingdom) Oliver Rowland; Lucas di Grassi; Roberto Merhi; Jehan Daruvala
- Races: 147
- Wins: 6
- Podiums: 33
- Poles: 14
- Fastest laps: 13
- Points: 1142
- First entry: 2014 Beijing ePrix
- Last entry: 2026 London ePrix
- First win: 2017 Berlin ePrix
- Last win: 2026 Tokyo ePrix
- Website: www.mahindraracing.com

Mahindra Racing is a motor racing team based in Banbury, England, competing with an Indian racing license. It is part of the Mahindra Group. The team is currently competing in the electric FIA Formula E Championship and has been since the inaugural season in 2014. The team formerly competed in Grand Prix motorcycle racing, fielding a team in the junior 125cc category (later renamed Moto3) between 2011 and 2015. Mahindra later refocused on being a bike and engine supplier, until ultimately pulling out of the sport in 2017.

== FIA Formula E World Championship (2014–present) ==
=== 2014–15 season ===
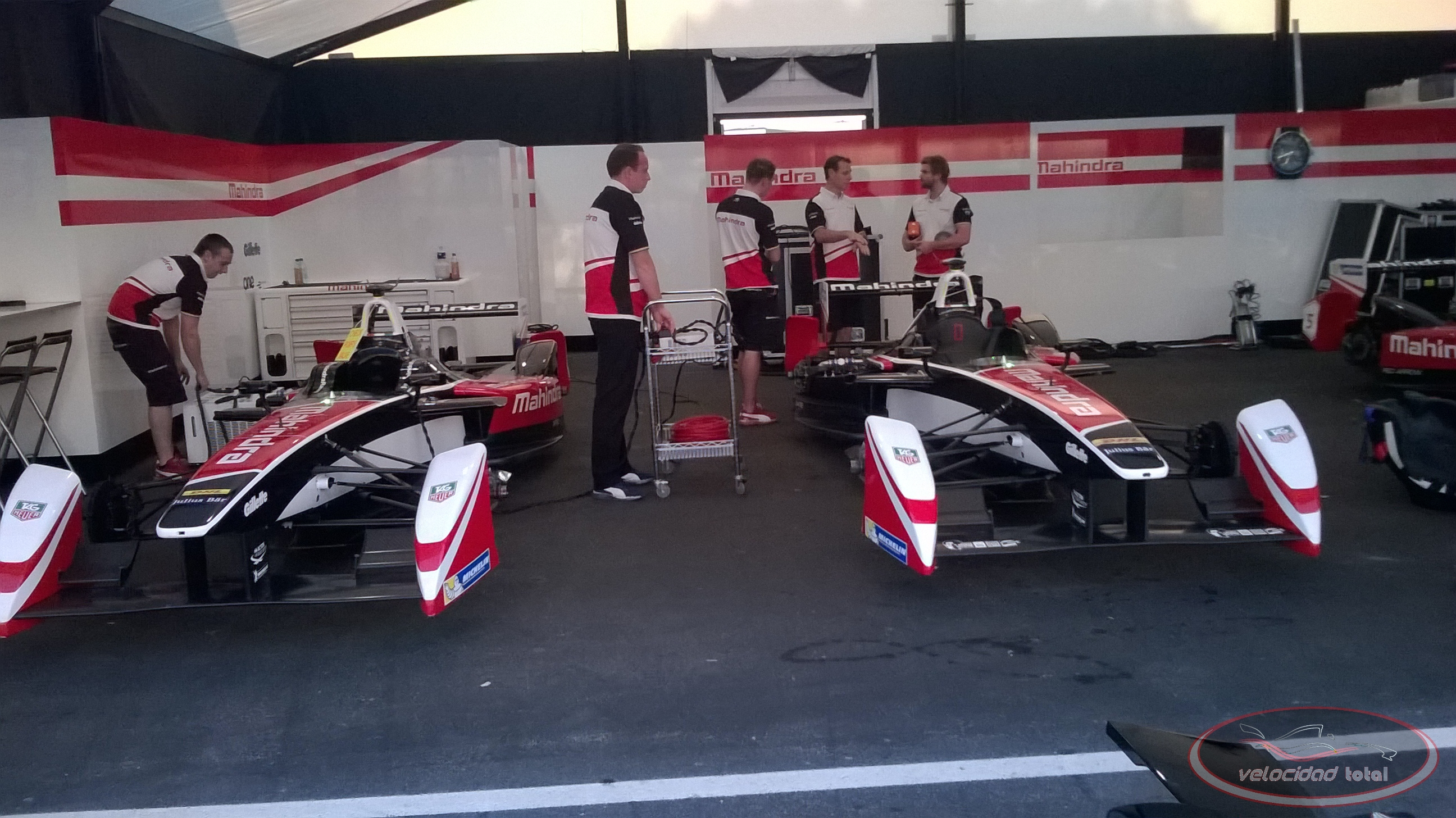
Mahindra cars at the 2014 Punta del Este ePrix.

Mahindra Racing competes in the FIA Formula E World Championship. They entered the Championship in the inaugural 2014-2015 season as one of the ten founding teams.

=== 2015–16 season ===
From the second season, the team developed its own electric powertrain, the M2Electro, to power their quartet of electric racing cars. The M2Electro impressed out of the box, with Nick Heidfeld scoring the team's first podium in the opening round in Beijing. Bruno Senna had a second place podium finish in the first of the two season finale races in London. The M2Electro also impressed with its efficiency and reliability, contributing to seven double points finishes throughout the season.

=== 2016–17 season ===
Rookie Felix Rosenqvist joined as teammate to Nick Heidfeld. Mahindra Racing developed the new M3Electro car, which proved to be a competitive package, powering the team to its maiden win at the hands of Rosenqvist at the 2017 Berlin ePrix. The team also scored nine further podiums, three pole positions and two fastest lap awards. These results were underscored by Mahindra Racing's third place in the Teams’ Championship standings.

=== 2017–18 season ===
Drivers Felix Rosenqvist and Nick Heidfeld remained with Mahindra for the fourth season, piloting the M4Electro to two further victories, in Hong Kong and Marrakesh, and three pole positions. After a strong and encouraging start to the season, the team finished fourth overall in the team's championship, with Rosenqvist in the driver's title hunt for much of the season.

=== 2018–19 season ===
For Season Five, Felix Rosenqvist left the team to join the Chip Ganassi Racing team in IndyCar series and was replaced by former Dragon Racing driver Jérôme d'Ambrosio. Nick Heidfeld stepped down from his race seat to become a special advisor and official reserve driver for the squad and was replaced by former Manor and Sauber Formula 1 driver and DTM champion Pascal Wehrlein. Racing the M5Electro, the Mahindra drivers secured one win, two podiums, two fastest laps, a pole position and seven Super Pole appearances between them, finishing the Championship in sixth place.

=== 2019–20 season ===
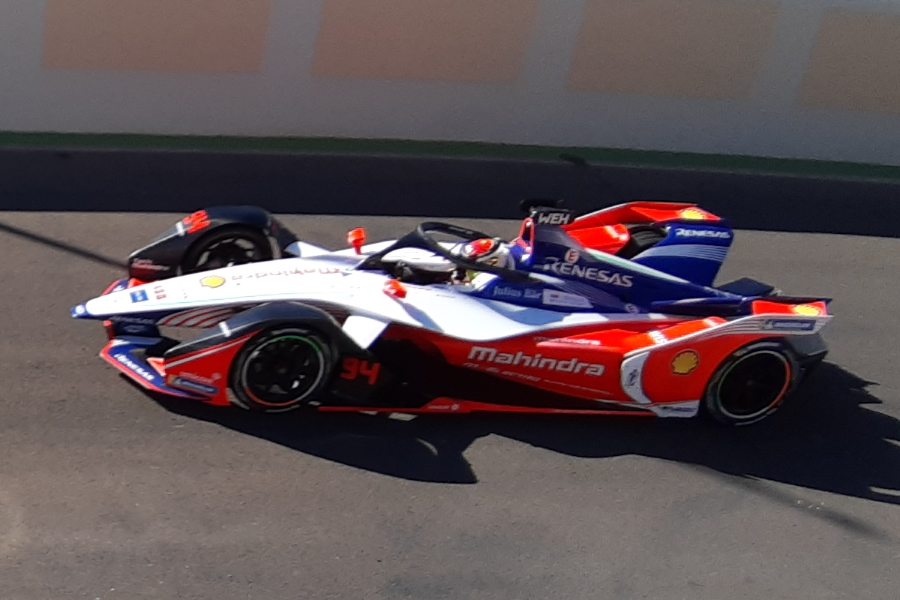
Pascal Wehrlein at the 2019 Marrakesh ePrix.

Wehrlein and D'Ambrosio were announced as continuing with the team for Season 6 at a launch event in Germany in October 2019. On 24 June 2020 the team announced that Alex Lynn would replace Wehrlein for the remainder of the 2019/20 Season. The team finished the 2019–20 season ranking ninth on the constructors standings. D'Ambrosio would later announce his retirement from professional racing after the season to take on a team principal role at Venturi Racing.

=== 2020–21 season ===
On 29 October 2020, Mahindra revealed the new M7Electro car, Alexander Sims and Alex Lynn were confirmed as the driver lineup for the 2020–21 Formula E season. Lynn secured a race victory in London Race 2.

=== 2021–22 season ===
Lynn was replaced by Oliver Rowland for the 2021–22 Formula E season.

=== 2022–23 season ===
Sims was announced to not return to the team for the 2022–23 season; he was replaced by Lucas di Grassi. Team principal Dilbagh Gill left the team in September 2022, entering a period of gardening leave; he was replaced by Frédéric Bertrand. In May, it was announced that Oliver Rowland would leave the team, and be replaced by Roberto Merhi for the 2023 Jakarta ePrix.

=== 2023–24 season ===
Despite being contracted for 2024, Mahindra announced that di Grassi have left the team on 26 September 2023. On the following day, Mahindra announced the signing of 2020–21 series champion Nyck De Vries and Edoardo Mortara for the 2023–24 season.

In January 2024, Mahindra drew significant criticism for using generative AI to create a fake Instagram brand ambassador named "Ava Rose" instead of hiring an actual woman. After the backlash, the "Ava Rose" account was deleted (along with the post announcing the partnership), and Mahindra Racing CEO and principal Frédéric Bertrand issued a statement announcing the discontinuation of the program.

=== Mahindra Racing Team and Drivers ===
Season	Drivers	Car	Drivetrain	Tyres	Operator / Management
2014–15	(India) Karun Chandhok	Spark-Renault SRT 01E	SRT 01E / McLaren Applied Technologies	Michelin	Carlin Motorsport
2014–15	(Brazil) Bruno Senna	Spark-Renault SRT 01E	SRT 01E / McLaren Applied Technologies	Michelin	Carlin Motorsport
2015–16	(Germany) Nick Heidfeld	Spark-Renault SRT 01E	Mahindra / Rockfort Engineering M2ELECTRO	Michelin	Campos Racing
2015–16	(Brazil) Bruno Senna	Spark-Renault SRT 01E	Mahindra / Rockfort Engineering M2ELECTRO	Michelin	Campos Racing
2016–17	(Germany) Nick Heidfeld	Spark-Renault SRT 01E	Mahindra / Magneti Marelli M3ELECTRO	Michelin	Campos Racing
2016–17	(Sweden) Felix Rosenqvist	Spark-Renault SRT 01E	Mahindra / Magneti Marelli M3ELECTRO	Michelin	Campos Racing
2017–18	(Germany) Nick Heidfeld	Spark-Renault SRT 01E	Mahindra / Magneti Marelli M4ELECTRO	Michelin	Campos Racing
2017–18	(Sweden) Felix Rosenqvist	Spark-Renault SRT 01E	Mahindra / Magneti Marelli M4ELECTRO	Michelin	Campos Racing
2018–19	(Sweden) Felix Rosenqvist	Spark SRT05e	Mahindra / Magneti Marelli M5ELECTRO	Michelin	Campos Racing
2018–19	(Germany) Pascal Wehrlein	Spark SRT05e	Mahindra / Magneti Marelli M5ELECTRO	Michelin	Campos Racing
2018–19	(Belgium) Jérôme d'Ambrosio	Spark SRT05e	Mahindra / Magneti Marelli M5ELECTRO	Michelin	Campos Racing
2019–20	(Germany) Pascal Wehrlein	Spark SRT05e	Mahindra / Magneti Marelli M6ELECTRO	Michelin	Mahindra Racing
2019–20	(Belgium) Jérôme d'Ambrosio	Spark SRT05e	Mahindra / Magneti Marelli M6ELECTRO	Michelin	Mahindra Racing
2019–20	(United Kingdom) Alex Lynn	Spark SRT05e	Mahindra / Magneti Marelli M6ELECTRO	Michelin	Mahindra Racing
2020–21	(United Kingdom) Alexander Sims	Spark SRT05e	Mahindra / ZF Friedrichshafen M7ELECTRO	Michelin	Mahindra Racing
2020–21	(United Kingdom) Alex Lynn	Spark SRT05e	Mahindra / ZF Friedrichshafen M7ELECTRO	Michelin	Mahindra Racing
2021–22	(United Kingdom) Alexander Sims	Spark SRT05e	Mahindra / ZF Friedrichshafen M8ELECTRO	Michelin	Mahindra Racing
2021–22	(United Kingdom) Oliver Rowland	Spark SRT05e	Mahindra / ZF Friedrichshafen M8ELECTRO	Michelin	Mahindra Racing
2022–23	(United Kingdom) Oliver Rowland	Formula E Gen3	Mahindra / ZF Friedrichshafen M9ELECTRO	Hankook	Mahindra Racing
2022–23	(Brazil) Lucas di Grassi	Formula E Gen3	Mahindra / ZF Friedrichshafen M9ELECTRO	Hankook	Mahindra Racing
2022–23	(Spain) Roberto Merhi	Formula E Gen3	Mahindra / ZF Friedrichshafen M9ELECTRO	Hankook	Mahindra Racing
2023–24	(Netherlands) Nyck De Vries	Formula E Gen3	Mahindra M10ELECTRO	Hankook	Mahindra Racing
2023–24	(Switzerland) Edoardo Mortara	Formula E Gen3	Mahindra M10ELECTRO	Hankook	Mahindra Racing
2023–24	(United Kingdom) Jordan King	Formula E Gen3	Mahindra M10ELECTRO	Hankook	Mahindra Racing
2024–25	(Netherlands) Nyck De Vries	Formula E Gen3	Mahindra M11ELECTRO	Hankook	Mahindra Racing
2024–25	(Brazil) Felipe Drugovich	Formula E Gen3	Mahindra M11ELECTRO	Hankook	Mahindra Racing
2024–25	(Switzerland) Edoardo Mortara	Formula E Gen3	Mahindra M11ELECTRO	Hankook	Mahindra Racing
2025–26	(Netherlands) Nyck De Vries	Formula E Gen3	Mahindra M12ELECTRO	Hankook	Mahindra Racing
2025–26	(Switzerland) Edoardo Mortara	Formula E Gen3	Mahindra M12ELECTRO	Hankook	Mahindra Racing

== FIM MotoGP Series ==
=== As a team (2011–2014) ===
In 2011, Mahindra Racing made its motor racing debut in the 125cc class of the MotoGP championship, which was then in its last year. The team used the GP125 racing motorcycle produced by Italy-based Engines Engineering, which Mahindra had acquired in 2008. The team performed well in their inaugural season, capped off by Danny Webb securing the team's first-ever pole position in the last race, at the Circuit Ricardo Tormo in Valencia, Spain. Mahindra Racing ended the season third in the constructors' championship.

In 2012, Mahindra Racing participated in the newly formed Moto3 class (250cc four-stroke) which replaced the 125cc class. The team utilized the Mahindra MGP3O motorcycle developed and built by Engines Engineering from the 2012 season. Danny Webb and Marcel Schrötter raced for the team in the first eight rounds of the Moto3 World Championship. The team scored its first Moto3 points at Le Mans on 20 May 2012, when Schrötter finished on a strong 12th position. Before the ninth round, at the Mugello Circuit, Schrötter and Team Mahindra parted ways. Riccardo Moretti, who had until then been racing for Mahindra in the CIV, stepped in for Schrötter. The first year of the new Moto3 four-stroke class proved challenging, and prompted the team into a change of direction. In August 2012, Mahindra Racing announced a partnership with Suter Racing Technology to build an all-new MG3PO. The team also announced that it would move its base from Italy to Switzerland. In November of the same year, they announced that riders Efrén Vázquez and Miguel Oliveira would be racing for the team in the 2013 season.

The MG3PO for the 2013 season was built over a period of four months at the team base in Turbenthal, Switzerland, and debuted at the 2013 Moto3 season opener at Qatar, where the team achieved a double Top-10 finish. This result was followed by Oliveira's 5th-place finish at the Circuit of the Americas, Team Mahindra's best performance at that point. Mahindra Racing made history in the 2013 Malaysian Grand Prix taking the first-ever podium for an Indian constructor in the MotoGP World Championship Series. In the same season, the MGP3O recorded top-five finishes in 10 of the 17 rounds, a pole position, three circuit lap records, and third position in the Constructors’ Championship. At the end of 2013, Vázquez confirmed that he would no longer be riding with Mahindra Racing in the 2014 season, and was replaced by Arthur Sissis.

The 2014 season saw some success for Mahindra, with their MGP3O recording three podiums – including a best-ever second-place finish by their customer team, Ambrogio Racing's rider Brad Binder at the German Grand Prix. The first podium of the season was secured by Mahindra Racing rider Miguel Oliveira at the Assen circuit in the Dutch TT. For the entire season, the team riders Oliveira and Andrea Migno regularly challenged at the front of the tight Moto3 pack. The MGP3O recorded six Top-4 finishes in the entire season, as Mahindra finished third overall in the Moto3 Constructors' rankings at the end of the 2014 season.

Following the conclusion of the 2014 season, Mahindra no longer ran their own team and concentrated instead on development of the Mahindra MGP3O racing motorcycle. They switched from competing as a team, and focused on supplying bikes to customer teams, including the Mapfre Aspar Team, which served as Mahindra's factory team for the 2015, 2016 and 2017 seasons. Mahindra Racing also moved their base to Italy, where they opened a new engineering and development centre in Besozzo.

=== As a manufacturer (2013–2017) ===
Mahindra Racing supplied two Mahindra MGP3O motorcycles to Ambrogio Racing for the 2013 season, which was its first customer team. For the 2014 season, Mahindra Racing supplied Mahindra MGP3O motorcycles to Ambrogio Racing, CIP Moto3 and San Carlo Team Italia. Mahindra acquired a 51% controlling stake in Peugeot Motocycles in January 2015.

In 2015, Mahindra Racing became a full-scale independent constructor, supporting four customer teams in the Moto3 series, including a three-bike line up from 4 times World Champion Jorge Martinez's experienced Mapfre Aspar Team. The Aspar Team's Mahindra MGP3Os were piloted by the 2014 Red Bull Rookies Champion, Spaniard Jorge Martin; Italian Francesco Bagnaia, a graduate of the VR 46 academy, who switched from the Sky VR46 team; and Juanfran Guevara, contesting his third Moto3 World Championship. Mahindra also supplied bikes for CIP Moto3, San Carlo Team Italia, and Outox Reset Drink Team for the 2015 season.

In 2015, a Mahindra customer team recorded a podium finish at the French Grand Prix. 2016 got off to a strong start with Aspar Mahindra Moto3 Team rider Francesco (Pecco) Bagnaia securing a third-place podium finish at the opening round in Qatar. The Italian teen picked up podiums in Jerez (Spain) and Mugello (Italy) before making his historic first win in Assen (Netherlands) – Mahindra's maiden victory in the World Championship, and a first for a bike made by an Indian company. Two more victories followed with John Mcphee dominating the field in a wet Czech Grand Prix and Pecco taking a seven-second win in the Malaysian Grand Prix. At the Czech Grand Prix, the Indian manufacturer also scored their first-ever double podium with John Mcphee and Jorge Martin.

In 2016, Mahindra supplied MG3PO motorcycles to the factory Aspar Mahindra Team, CIP, Team Italia, Minimoto Portomaggiore, and Platinum Bay Real Estate/Motomex Team Worldwide Race. It also supplied MG3PO motorcycles under the Peugeot Motorcycles badge to the Peugeot Saxoprint RTG team.

In June 2017, Mahindra Racing announced that it would end its participation in the Moto3 class of MotoGP at the end of the season in order to focus on Formula E. Mahindra Racing supplied the Mahindra MGP3O single-cylinder, 4-stroke, 250cc motorcycle to the factory Aspar Mahindra Team and other customer teams in the 2017 season. It also supplied an official Peugeot Motocycles derivative of the MGP3O to the factory Peugeot MC Saxoprint Team. Mahindra Racing left Moto3 after the 2017 season, and remains the only Indian constructor to have taken part in the series.

== Other series ==
=== CIV – Italian National Motorcycle Racing Championship ===
==== 125 cc and Moto3 class ====
In early December 2012, Mahindra Racing announced its entry into the 125cc class of the Italian National Motorcycle Racing Championship (CIV) with Indian rider S. Sarath Kumar and Italian phenomenon Riccardo Moretti. Moretti was the 2009 champion in the 125cc class while Kumar is a former champion in the 130cc 4-stroke (Novice class, 2008) and the 165cc Expert Class (2009). Moretti won the season-opener, at the Mugello Circuit, Mahindra's first time earning a 1st-place finish. Kumar earned a third-place finish in the third round, at Monza. He left professional racing for personal reasons after round six. Moretti won the second and fourth races, at Imola and Mugello respectively. In the sixth round, at Misano, Moretti and new Mahindra rider Miroslav Popov finished first and second respectively; in the seventh round, again at Misano, Popov took first, while Moretti finished third.

In the final race of the 2012 season, Popov again took first place, and was joined on the podium by new Mahindra Racing rider Lukas Trautmann, who earned a second-place finish in his debut race. The double podium, Mahindra's third of the season, earned the team the 2012 CIV Constructor's Cup, making Mahindra the first Indian team to win an international motorsport championship.

In the 2013 season, the team entered the Moto3 class (250cc 4 stroke) in the CIV with talented riders Andrea Locatelli and Michael Rinaldi. Locatelli ended Rounds 1 and 2 with a twin podium finish: he won the first race, and finished in third place in the second. Rinaldi finished eighth in the first encounter and sixth in the second. Mahindra would go on to win the CIV Constructors’ Championship (Moto3) in 2013, and again in 2015.

Grand Prix rider Max Biaggi rode for Mahindra 2017 CIV – Italian National Championship (Moto3).

=== FIM CEV International Championship ===
In addition to the World Championship, Mahindra Racing was a part of the FIM CEV International Championship (Moto3 Junior World Championship). They supplied MGP3O machines to Team Aspar and Team LaGlisse to compete in the World Championship feeder series.

== Mahindra Racing Team Riders ==
=== FIM MotoGP (125cc and Moto3) ===
- (Germany) Marcel Schrötter No. 77 (2011–2012)
- (United Kingdom) Danny Webb No. 99 (2011–2012)
- (Czech Republic) Miroslav Popov No. 95 (2012)
- (Italy) Riccardo Moretti No. 20 (2012)
- (Portugal) Miguel Oliveira No. 44 (2013–2014)
- (Spain) Efrén Vázquez No. 7 (2013)
- (Italy) Andrea Locatelli No. 55 (2013)
- (Italy) Andrea Migno No. 16 (2014)
- (Australia) Arthur Sissis No. 61 (2014 - 2019)
- (Italy) Francesco Bagnaia No. 21 (2015)
- (Spain) Jorge Martín No. 88 (2015)
- (Spain) Juanfran Guevara No. 58 (2015)
- (Italy) Stefano Manzi No. 62 (2016)
- (Italy) Marco Bezzecchi No. 53 (2016)

== Customer teams ==
=== FIM MotoGP (Moto3) ===
Ambrogio Racing (2013–2014)

- (South Africa) Brad Binder No. 41 (2013–2014)
- (Germany) Luca Amato No. 21 (2013)
- (France) Jules Danilo No. 95 (2014)

CIP Team (2014–2017)

- (Italy) Alessandro Tonucci No. 19 (2014)
- (Netherlands) Bryan Schouten No. 51 (2014)
- (Netherlands) Jasper Iwema No. 13 (2014)
- (Japan) Tatsuki Suzuki No. 24 (2015–2016)
- (Australia) Remy Gardner No. 2 (2015)
- (Italy) Fabio Spiranelli No. 3 (2016)
- (France) Enzo Boulom No. 99 (2016)
- (Italy) Marco Bezzecchi No. 12 (2017)
- (Italy) Manuel Pagliani No. 96 (2017)

Team Italia (2014–2016)

- (Italy) Andrea Locatelli No. 55 (2014)
- (Italy) Matteo Ferrari No. 3 (2014–2015)
- (Italy) Marco Bezzecchi No. 53 (2015)
- (Italy) Stefano Manzi No. 29 (2015)
- (Italy) Stefano Valtulini No. 43 (2016)
- (Italy) Lorenzo Petrarca No. 77 (2016)

Outox Reset Drink Team (2015)

- (Italy) Alessandro Tonucci No. 19 (2015)
- (South Africa) Darryn Binder No. 40 (2015)

Aspar Mahindra Team Moto3 (2016–2017)

- (Italy) Francesco Bagnaia No. 21 (2016)
- (Spain) Jorge Martín No. 88 (2016)
- (Spain) Albert Arenas No. 75 (2017)
- (Italy) Lorenzo Dalla Porta No. 48 (2017)

Platinum Bay Real Estate Team (2016)

- (South Africa) Darryn Binder No. 40 (2016)
- (Czech Republic) Karel Hanika No. 98 (2016)
- (United Kingdom) Danny Webb No. 22 (2016)
- (Spain) Marcos Ramírez No. 42 (2016)

Peugeot MC Saxoprint Team (2016–2017)

- (France) Alexis Masbou No. 10 (2016)
- (United Kingdom) John Mcphee No. 17 (2016)
- (Spain) Albert Arenas No. 12 (2016)
- (Malaysia) Hafiq Azmi No. 38 (2016)
- (Spain) Vicente Pérez No. 63 (2016)
- (Czech Republic) Jakub Kornfeil No. 84 (2017)
- (Finland) Patrik Pulkkinen No. 4 (2017)

Minimoto Portomaggiore Team (2016)

- (San Marino) Alex Fabbri No. 71 (2016)

Motomex Team Worldwide Race (2016)

- (Mexico) Gabriel Martínez-Ábrego No. 18 (2016)

Mahindra MRW Aspar Team (2017)

- (Spain) Raúl Fernández No. 31 (2017)

3570-MTA Team (2017)

- (Italy) Edoardo Sintoni No. 30 (2017)

== Racing results ==
=== Formula E results ===
(key)

Year	Chassis	Powertrain	Tyres	No.	Drivers	1	2	3	4	5	6	7	8	9	10	11	12	13	14	15	16	17	Points	T.C.
2014–15	Spark; SRT01-e	SRT01-e^{1}	M			BEI	PUT	PDE	BUE	MIA	LBH	MCO	BER	MSC	LDN								58	8th
2014–15	Spark; SRT01-e	SRT01-e^{1}	M	5	(India) Karun Chandhok	5	6	13	Ret	14	12	13	18	12	12	13							58	8th
2014–15	Spark; SRT01-e	SRT01-e^{1}	M	21	(Brazil) Bruno Senna	Ret	14†	6	5	Ret	5	Ret	17	16	16	4							58	8th
2015–16	Spark; SRT01-e	Mahindra; M2Electro	M			BEI	PUT	PDE	BUE	MEX	LBH	PAR	BER	LDN									105	5th
2015–16	Spark; SRT01-e	Mahindra; M2Electro	M	21	(Brazil) Bruno Senna	13	5	Ret	10	10	5	9	15^{F}	2	6								105	5th
2015–16	Spark; SRT01-e	Mahindra; M2Electro	M	23	(Germany) Nick Heidfeld	3	9		7	8	4	12^{F}	7	13	7								105	5th
2015–16	Spark; SRT01-e	Mahindra; M2Electro	M	23	(United Kingdom) Oliver Rowland			13															105	5th
2016–17	Spark; SRT01-e	Mahindra; M3Electro	M			HKG	MRK	BUE	MEX	MCO	PAR	BER		NYC		MTL							215	3rd
2016–17	Spark; SRT01-e	Mahindra; M3Electro	M	19	(Sweden) Felix Rosenqvist	15^{F}	3^{P}	18^{F}	16	6	4	1	2^{P}	15	2	9	2^{P}						215	3rd
2016–17	Spark; SRT01-e	Mahindra; M3Electro	M	23	(Germany) Nick Heidfeld	3	9	15	12	3	3	3	10	16	3	Ret	5						215	3rd
2017–18	Spark; SRT01-e	Mahindra; M4Electro	M			HKG		MRK	SCL	MEX	PDE	RME	PAR	BER	ZUR	NYC							138	4th
2017–18	Spark; SRT01-e	Mahindra; M4Electro	M	19	(Sweden) Felix Rosenqvist	14	1^{PF}	1	4	Ret^{P}	5	Ret^{P}	8	11	15	14	5						138	4th
2017–18	Spark; SRT01-e	Mahindra; M4Electro	M	23	(Germany) Nick Heidfeld	3	16	7	Ret	Ret	Ret	16	11	10	6	6	8						138	4th
2018–19	Spark; SRT05e	Mahindra; M5Electro	M			ADR	MRK	SCL	MEX	HKG	SYX	RME	PAR	MCO	BER	BRN	NYC						125	6th
2018–19	Spark; SRT05e	Mahindra; M5Electro	M	64	(Belgium) Jérôme d'Ambrosio	3	1	10	4	Ret	6	8	17†	11	17	13	9	11					125	6th
2018–19	Spark; SRT05e	Mahindra; M5Electro	M	94	(Sweden) Felix Rosenqvist	Ret																	125	6th
2018–19	Spark; SRT05e	Mahindra; M5Electro	M	94	(Germany) Pascal Wehrlein		Ret	2	6^{PF}	Ret	7	10	10	4^{F}	10	Ret	7	12					125	6th
2019-20	Spark; SRT05e	Mahindra; M6Electro	M				ADR		SCL	MEX	MRK	BER		BER		BER							49	9th
2019-20	Spark; SRT05e	Mahindra; M6Electro	M	64	(Belgium) Jérôme d'Ambrosio	9	DNS	NC	10	13	5	DSQ	7	15	16	18							49	9th
2019-20	Spark; SRT05e	Mahindra; M6Electro	M	94	(Germany) Pascal Wehrlein	11	15	4	9	22													49	9th
2019-20	Spark; SRT05e	Mahindra; M6Electro	M	94	(United Kingdom) Alex Lynn						12	11	17	9	5	8							49	9th
2020–21	Spark; SRT05e	Mahindra; M7Electro	M			DIR		RME		VLC		MCO	MEX		NYC		LDN		BER	BER			132	9th
2020–21	Spark; SRT05e	Mahindra; M7Electro	M	29	(United Kingdom) Alexander Sims	7	15	Ret	2	DSQ	23	Ret	4	14	Ret	6	Ret	16	17	5			132	9th
2020–21	Spark; SRT05e	Mahindra; M7Electro	M	94	(United Kingdom) Alex Lynn	Ret	Ret	8	17	DSQ^{G}	3^{F}	9	10	6	11	9	**3**	1^{G}	20	13			132	9th
2021–22	Spark; SRT05e	Mahindra; M8Electro	M			DRH		MEX	RME		MCO	BER		JAK	MRK	NYC		LDN		SEO			46	8th
2021–22	Spark; SRT05e	Mahindra; M8Electro	M	29	(United Kingdom) Alexander Sims	14	Ret	Ret	12	Ret	11	9	18	15	14	14	4	13	11	Ret	12		46	8th
2021–22	Spark; SRT05e	Mahindra; M8Electro	M	30	(United Kingdom) Oliver Rowland	Ret	8	16	Ret	Ret	Ret	11	7	Ret	10	13	14	Ret	Ret	2^{P}	Ret		46	8th
2022–23	Formula E Gen3	Mahindra M9Electro	H			MEX	DIR		HYD	CPT	SPL	BER		MCO	JAK		PRT	RME		LDN			41	10th
2022–23	Formula E Gen3	Mahindra M9Electro	H	8	(United Kingdom) Oliver Rowland	13	19	Ret	6	WD	15	10	14	Ret									41	10th
2022–23	Formula E Gen3	Mahindra M9Electro	H	8	(Spain) Roberto Merhi										18	17	Ret	12	Ret	15	20		41	10th
2022–23	Formula E Gen3	Mahindra M9Electro	H	11	(Brazil) Lucas di Grassi	**3**	13	15	14	WD	13	11	12	12	14	14	7	Ret	Ret	6	18		41	10th
2023–24	Formula E Gen3	Mahindra M10Electro	H			MEX	DIR		SAP	TKO	ITA		MCO	BER		SHA		POR		LDN			47	10th
2023–24	Formula E Gen3	Mahindra M10Electro	H	21	(Netherlands) Nyck de Vries	15	17	15	14	Ret	14	15	12			7	16	12	Ret	4	16		47	10th
2023–24	Formula E Gen3	Mahindra M10Electro	H	21	(United Kingdom) Jordan King									12	18								47	10th
2023–24	Formula E Gen3	Mahindra M10Electro	H	48	(Switzerland) Edoardo Mortara	13	15	11	12	DSQ	Ret	13	Ret	**8**	16	Ret	13	4	Ret	5	Ret		47	10th
2024–25	Formula E Gen3 Evo	Mahindra M11Electro	H			SAP	MEX	JED		MIA	MCO		TKO		SHA		JAK	BER		LDN			186	4th
2024–25	Formula E Gen3 Evo	Mahindra M11Electro	H	21	(Netherlands) Nyck de Vries	6	8	4	13	11	2	5	11	15	8	12	Ret			2	2		186	4th
2024–25	Formula E Gen3 Evo	Mahindra M11Electro	H	21	(Brazil) Felipe Drugovich													17	7				186	4th
2024–25	Formula E Gen3 Evo	Mahindra M11Electro	H	48	(Switzerland) Edoardo Mortara	5	19	7	10	5	4	12	6	12	Ret	19	2	3	11	4	Ret		186	4th
2025-26	Formula E Gen3 Evo	Mahindra M11Electro	H			SAP	MEX	MIA	JED		MAD	BER		MCO		SAN	SHA		TKO		LDN		252	3rd
2025-26	Formula E Gen3 Evo	Mahindra M11Electro	H	21	(Netherlands) Nyck de Vries	9	Ret	5	DNS	20	18	9	Ret	1	8	3	5	18	17	1	13	**2**	252	3rd
2025-26	Formula E Gen3 Evo	Mahindra M11Electro	H	48	(Switzerland) Edoardo Mortara	Ret	2	6	**2**	**4**	5	**4**	7	17	5	Ret	15	16	5	**Ret**	7	3	252	3rd

Notes

- **^1** – In the inaugural season, all teams were supplied with a spec powertrain by McLaren.
- * – Season still in progress.
- † – Driver did not finish the race, but was classified as they completed over 90% of the race distance.
- ^{G} – Driver was fastest in group qualifying stage and was given one championship point.
- **P**– Marks the driver who was given three points for being starting on Pole.
- **F**– Marks the driver who was given one point for fastest lap.

=== Other teams supplied by Mahindra ===
Year	Team	Chassis	Powertrain	Tyres	No.	Drivers	Points	T.C.
2022–23	(Germany) Abt Cupra Formula E Team	Spark Gen3	Mahindra M9Electro	H	No.	Drivers	21	11th
2022–23	(Germany) Abt Cupra Formula E Team	Spark Gen3	Mahindra M9Electro	H	4	(Netherlands) Robin Frijns	21	11th
2022–23	(Germany) Abt Cupra Formula E Team	Spark Gen3	Mahindra M9Electro	H	4	(South Africa) Kelvin van der Linde	21	11th
2022–23	(Germany) Abt Cupra Formula E Team	Spark Gen3	Mahindra M9Electro	H	51	(Switzerland) Nico Müller	21	11th
2023–24	(Germany) Abt Cupra Formula E Team	Spark Gen3	Mahindra M9Electro	H				
2023–24	(Germany) Abt Cupra Formula E Team	Spark Gen3	Mahindra M9Electro	H	11	(Brazil) Lucas di Grassi	56	9th
2023–24	(Germany) Abt Cupra Formula E Team	Spark Gen3	Mahindra M9Electro	H	51	(Switzerland) Nico Müller	56	9th
2023–24	(Germany) Abt Cupra Formula E Team	Spark Gen3	Mahindra M9Electro	H	51	(South Africa) Kelvin van der Linde	56	9th

=== Moto3 and 125cc Manufacturers Championship ===
(key)

Year	1	2	3	4	5	6	7	8	9	10	11	12	13	14	15	16	17	18	Points	Pos.
2011	QAT	ESP	POR	FRA	CAT	GBR	NED	ITA	GER	CZE	IND	RSM	ARA	JPN	AUS	MAL	VAL		49	3rd
2011	16	13	16	Ret	16	11	9	11	14	12	Ret	15	11	12	10	13	12		49	3rd
2012	QAT	ESP	POR	FRA	CAT	GBR	NED	GER	ITA	IND	CZE	RSM	ARA	JPN	MAL	AUS	VAL		4	9th
2012	18	16	19	12	Ret	26	Ret	18	20	20	Ret	19	25	26	Ret	Ret	Ret		4	9th
2013	QAT	AME	ESP	FRA	ITA	CAT	NED	GER	IND	CZE	GBR	RSM	ARA	MAL	AUS	JPN	VAL		173	3rd
2013	7	5	8	Ret	4	5	4	4	8	9	5	7	5	3	7	4	5		173	3rd
2014	QAT	AME	ARG	ESP	FRA	ITA	CAT	NED	GER	IND	CZE	GBR	RSM	ARA	JPN	AUS	MAL	VAL	168	3rd
2014	4	15	13	14	12	4	6	3	2	7	6	4	6	7	3	7	14	8	168	3rd
2015	QAT	AME	ARG	ESP	FRA	ITA	CAT	NED	GER	IND	CZE	GBR	RSM	ARA	JPN	AUS	MAL	VAL	120	3rd
2015	9	15	11	7	3	4	11	11	12	10	11	7	8	7	11	10	12	13	120	3rd
2016	QAT	ARG	AME	ESP	FRA	ITA	CAT	NED	GER	AUT	CZE	GBR	RSM	ARA	JPN	AUS	MAL	VAL	211	3rd
2016	3	8	14	3	12	3	12	1	10	6	2	2	16	6	6	4	1	10	211	3rd
2017	QAT	ARG	AME	ESP	FRA	ITA	CAT	NED	GER	CZE	AUT	GBR	RSM	ARA	JPN	AUS	MAL	VAL	43	3rd
2017	22	19	17	14	14	17	14	16	15	12	19	15	8	19	3	10	15	20	43	3rd

=== CIV Italian National Motorcycle Racing Championship ===
==== 125cc class ====
(key) (Races in bold indicate pole position; races in italics indicate fastest lap)

Year	Motorcycle	Name	1	2	3	4	5	6	7	8	Points	RC	Points	MC
2012	Mahindra 125 GP		MU1	IMO	MON	MU2	MU3	MI1	MI2	VAL				
2012	Mahindra 125 GP	(Italy) Riccardo Moretti	**1**	1	NC	**1**	**Ret**	1	3		116	2nd	176	1st
2012	Mahindra 125 GP	(Czech Republic) Miroslav Popov						2	1	**1**	70	4th	176	1st
2012	Mahindra 125 GP	(India) Sarath Kumar	Ret	7	3	8	6				43	9th	176	1st
2012	Mahindra 125 GP	(Austria) Lukas Trautmann								2	20	11th	176	1st

==== Moto3 class ====
(key) (Races in bold indicate pole position; races in italics indicate fastest lap)

Year	Motorcycle	Name	1	2	3	4	5	6	7	8	9	10	Points	RC	Points	MC
2013	Mahindra MGP3O		MU1	MU2	VAL1	VAL2	MI1	MI2	IMO1	IMO2	MU3	MU4				
2013	Mahindra MGP3O	(Italy) Andrea Locatelli	**1**	**2**	6	Ret	**1**	**1**	**2**	**1**	6	9	167	1st	201	1st
2013	Mahindra MGP3O	(Italy) Michael Ruben Rinaldi	6	5	3	4	2	9	1	3	5	3	145	2nd	201	1st
2015	Mahindra MGP3O		MI1	MI2	VAL1	VAL2	MU1	MU2	IMO1	IMO2	MU3	MU4				
2015	Mahindra MGP3O	(Italy) Marco Bezzecchi	**1**	**1**	**Ret**	**1**	1	Ret	**1**	**Ret**	**1**	**1**	175	1st	215	1st
2015	Mahindra MGP3O	(Italy) Fabio Spiranelli	3	5	2	5	Ret	2	3	Ret	Ret	7	103	4th	215	1st
