= 2006 Euroseries 3000 =

Seasons
- ← 2005 2007 →

The 2006 Euroseries 3000 was the eighth Euro Formula 3000 season. The series was won by Italian Giacomo Ricci for the FMS International team.

All teams used the Lola B02/50-Zytek chassis/engine combination.

== Teams and drivers ==
Team	No.	Driver	Rounds
(Italy) FMS International	1	(Italy) Marco Bonanomi	All
(Italy) FMS International	2	(Italy) Giacomo Ricci	All
(Italy) FMS International	3	(Italy) Paolo Maria Nocera	1-6
(Italy) FMS International	3	(Italy) Marco Mocci	8-9
(Italy) Minardi by GP Racing	4	(Brazil) Tuka Rocha	1
(Italy) Minardi by GP Racing	4	(Spain) Roldán Rodríguez	2-8
(Italy) Minardi by GP Racing	4	(Brazil) Diego Nunes	9
(Italy) Minardi by GP Racing	5	(Uruguay) Juan Cáceres	1-6
(Italy) Minardi by GP Racing	5	(Italy) Davide Rigon	7
(Italy) Minardi by GP Racing	5	(Italy) Fausto Ippoliti	8-9
(Italy) Minardi by GP Racing	6	(Brazil) Tuka Rocha	5-9
(Belgium) Team Astromega	7	(Italy) Oliver Martini	2
(Belgium) Team Astromega	7	(Turkey) Jason Tahinci	3
(Belgium) Team Astromega	8	(Brazil) Tuka Rocha	3
(Italy) Auto Sport Racing	9	(South Africa) Gavin Cronje	All
(Italy) Auto Sport Racing	10	(Italy) Stefano Gattuso	1-7
(Italy) Avelon Formula	11	(Italy) Oliver Martini	1, 3-6
(Italy) Avelon Formula	11	(Italy) Fausto Ippoliti	2
(Italy) Avelon Formula	11	(Italy) Stefano Attianese	8
(Italy) Avelon Formula	12	(Italy) Ivan Bellarosa	All
(Italy) Vanni Racing/Traini Corse	14	(Italy) Matteo Cressoni	All
(Italy) Vanni Racing/Traini Corse	15	(Brazil) Tuka Rocha	2, 4
(Italy) Vanni Racing/Traini Corse	15	(Italy) Glauco Solieri	5
(Italy) Vanni Racing/Traini Corse	15	(Italy) Alex Ciompi	6-7
(Italy) Coloni Rookies Team	16	(Venezuela) Johnny Cecotto Jr.	7
(Italy) Coloni Rookies Team	16	(Italy) Frankie Provenzano	8
(Italy) Coloni Rookies Team	16	(Austria) Bianca Steiner	9
(Italy) Euronova Racing	18	(Italy) Marcello Puglisi	1-4
(Italy) Euronova Racing	18	(Belgium) Jérôme d'Ambrosio	5-9
(Italy) Euronova Racing	19	(Russia) Vitaly Petrov	All
(Italy) Euronova Racing	20	(Italy) Francesco Dracone	1–2, 5-9
(Italy) Scuderia Famà	22	(Italy) Glauco Solieri	1-2
(Italy) Facodini Racing	24	(Italy) Leandro Romano	2, 9
(Italy) Facodini Racing	25	(Italy) Gianmaria Gabbiani	8
(Hungary) Szász Motorsport	26	(Hungary) László Szász	4

== Race calendar ==
Rounds denoted with a blue background are a part of the Italian Formula 3000 Championship.

Round		Circuit	Date	Pole Position	Fastest Lap	Winning Driver	Winning Team
1	R1	(Italy) Adria International Raceway	9 April	(Italy) Marco Bonanomi	(Italy) Marco Bonanomi	(Italy) Marco Bonanomi	(Italy) FMS International
1	R2	(Italy) Adria International Raceway	9 April		(Italy) Giacomo Ricci	(Italy) Giacomo Ricci	(Italy) FMS International
2	R1	(Italy) Autodromo Enzo e Dino Ferrari	7 May	(Italy) Marco Bonanomi	(Italy) Giacomo Ricci	(Italy) Giacomo Ricci	(Italy) FMS International
2	R2	(Italy) Autodromo Enzo e Dino Ferrari	7 May		(Italy) Giacomo Ricci	(Italy) Giacomo Ricci	(Italy) FMS International
3	R1	(Belgium) Circuit de Spa-Francorchamps	4 June	(Italy) Marco Bonanomi	(Italy) Marco Bonanomi	(Italy) Marco Bonanomi	(Italy) FMS International
3	R2	(Belgium) Circuit de Spa-Francorchamps	4 June		(Spain) Roldán Rodríguez	(Italy) Giacomo Ricci	(Italy) FMS International
4	R1	(Hungary) Hungaroring	18 June	(Italy) Marco Bonanomi	(Italy) Giacomo Ricci	(Italy) Marco Bonanomi	(Italy) FMS International
4	R2	(Hungary) Hungaroring	18 June		(Italy) Marco Bonanomi	(Russia) Vitaly Petrov	(Italy) Euronova Racing
5	R1	(Italy) Mugello Circuit	9 July	(Italy) Marco Bonanomi	(Italy) Marco Bonanomi	(Italy) Marco Bonanomi	(Italy) FMS International
5	R2	(Italy) Mugello Circuit	9 July		(Italy) Giacomo Ricci	(Russia) Vitaly Petrov	(Italy) Euronova Racing
6	R1	(United Kingdom) Silverstone Circuit	13 August	(Italy) Marco Bonanomi	(Russia) Vitaly Petrov	(Russia) Vitaly Petrov	(Italy) Euronova Racing
6	R2	(United Kingdom) Silverstone Circuit	13 August		(Italy) Giacomo Ricci	(Brazil) Tuka Rocha	(Italy) Minardi by GP Racing
7	R1	(Spain) Circuit de Catalunya	24 September	(Spain) Roldán Rodríguez	(Belgium) Jérôme d'Ambrosio	(Spain) Roldán Rodríguez	(Italy) Minardi by GP Racing
7	R2	(Spain) Circuit de Catalunya	24 September		(Russia) Vitaly Petrov	(Russia) Vitaly Petrov	(Italy) Euronova Racing
8	R1	(Italy) ACI Vallelunga Circuit	15 October	(Spain) Roldán Rodríguez	(Italy) Marco Bonanomi	(Italy) Marco Bonanomi	(Italy) FMS International
8	R2	(Italy) ACI Vallelunga Circuit	15 October		(Spain) Roldán Rodríguez	(Italy) Fausto Ippoliti	(Italy) Minardi by GP Racing
9	R1	(Italy) Misano World Circuit	22 October	(Italy) Giacomo Ricci	(Italy) Giacomo Ricci	(Italy) Giacomo Ricci	(Italy) FMS International
9	R2	(Italy) Misano World Circuit	22 October		(Italy) Marco Bonanomi	(Italy) Marco Bonanomi	(Italy) FMS International

== Championship Standings ==
- Points for both championships are awarded as follows:

Race
Position	1st	2nd	3rd	4th	5th	6th	7th	8th
**Race One**	10	8	6	5	4	3	2	1
**Race Two**	6	5	4	3	2	1		

In addition:

- One point will be awarded for Pole position for Race One
- One point will be awarded for fastest lap in each race

=== Driver standings ===
Pos	Driver	ADR (Italy)		IMO (Italy)		SPA (Belgium)		HUN (Hungary)		MUG (Italy)		SIL (United Kingdom)		CAT (Spain)		VLL (Italy)		MIS (Italy)		Points
1	(Italy) Giacomo Ricci	5	1	1	1	2	1	2	4	3	3	3	11	2	Ret	5	3	**1**	2	106
2	(Italy) Marco Bonanomi	**1**	5	**2**	2	**1**	Ret	**1**	12	**1**	8	**5**	4	Ret	Ret	1	10	5	1	94
3	(Russia) Vitaly Petrov	6	11	DNS	3	9	4	7	1	7	1	1	Ret	3	1	4	2	2	3	72
4	(Brazil) Tuka Rocha	2	6	7	14	10	Ret	3	3	4	6	7	1	5	4	3	4	Ret	DNS	51
5	(Belgium) Jérôme d'Ambrosio									5	Ret	2	5	4	Ret	2	5	3	4	39
6	(Spain) Roldán Rodríguez			4	5	3	6	11	5	DNS	9	4	Ret	**1**	10	**Ret**	6			36
7	(Uruguay) Juan Cáceres	4	4	DNS	7	8	2	4	6	8	5	9	2							28
8	(Italy) Matteo Cressoni	9	Ret	6	Ret	7	5	6	11	6	2	6	7	10	3	7	7	DNS	DNS	27
9	(Italy) Oliver Martini	7	12	3	8	DSQ	Ret	Ret	8	2	4	12	3							23
10	(South Africa) Gavin Cronje	Ret	7	5	9	6	8	8	2	10	11	10	12	8	6	8	Ret	7	5	20
11	(Italy) Stefano Gattuso	8	3	DNS	Ret	4	3	5	7	Ret	10	13	6	9	9	DNA	DNA			19
12	(Italy) Fausto Ippoliti			10	4											6	1	6	Ret	15
13	(Italy) Paolo Maria Nocera	3	2	Ret	6	DSQ	7	9	9	9	7	8	Ret							13
14	(Italy) Davide Rigon													6	2					8
15	(Brazil) Diego Nunes																	4	6	6
16	(Turkey) Jason Tahinci					5	11													4
17	(Venezuela) Johnny Cecotto Jr.													11	5					2
18	(Italy) Alex Ciompi											11	8	7	Ret					2
19	(Italy) Marco Mocci															11	Ret	8	7	1
20	(Italy) Glauco Solieri	11	10	8	12					12	13									1
21	(Italy) Stefano Attianese															Ret	11			0
22	(Italy) Ivan Bellarosa	DNS	DNS	Ret	10	Ret	9	10	10	11	Ret	Ret	9	Ret	7	9	8	9	8	0
23	(Italy) Francesco Dracone	Ret	9	Ret	11					Ret	12	Ret	10	DNS	8	12	9	DNS	DNS	0
24	(Italy) Frankie Provenzano															10	Ret			0
25	(Italy) Marcello Puglisi	10	8	9	Ret	12	10	12	13											0
26	(Italy) Leandro Romano			DNS	DNS													Ret	10	0
27	(Austria) Bianca Steiner																	10	9	0
28	(Hungary) László Szász							13	Ret											0
29	(Italy) Gianmaria Gabbiani															Ret	DNS			0
Pos	Driver	ADR (Italy)		IMO (Italy)		SPA (Belgium)		HUN (Hungary)		MUG (Italy)		SIL (United Kingdom)		CAT (Spain)		VLL (Italy)		MIS (Italy)		Points

Colour	Result
Gold	Winner
Silver	Second place
Bronze	Third place
Green	Points classification
Blue	Non-points classification
Blue	Non-classified finish (NC)
Purple	Retired, not classified (Ret)
Red	Did not qualify (DNQ)
Red	Did not pre-qualify (DNPQ)
Black	Disqualified (DSQ)
White	Did not start (DNS)
White	Withdrew (WD)
White	Race cancelled (C)
Blank	Did not practice (DNP)
Blank	Did not arrive (DNA)
Blank	Excluded (EX)

**Bold** - Pole
Italics - Fastest Lap

=== Team standings ===
Pos	Team	ADR (Italy)		IMO (Italy)		SPA (Belgium)		HUN (Hungary)		MUG (Italy)		SIL (United Kingdom)		CAT (Spain)		VLL (Italy)		MIS (Italy)		Points
1	(Italy) FMS International	**1**	5	**2**	2	**1**	Ret	**1**	12	**1**	8	**5**	4	Ret	Ret	1	10	5	1	214
1	(Italy) FMS International	5	1	1	1	2	1	2	4	3	3	3	11	2	Ret	5	3	**1**	2	214
2	(Italy) Minardi by GP Racing	2	6	4	5	3	6	11	5	DNS	9	4	Ret	**1**	10	**Ret**	6	4	6	129
2	(Italy) Minardi by GP Racing	4	4	DNS	7	8	2	4	6	8	5	9	2	6	2	6	1	6	Ret	129
3	(Italy) Euronova Racing	10	8	9	Ret	12	10	12	13	5	Ret	2	5	4	Ret	2	5	3	4	111
3	(Italy) Euronova Racing	6	11	DNS	3	9	4	7	1	7	1	1	Ret	3	1	4	2	2	3	111
4	(Italy) Vanni Racing/Traini Corse	9	Ret	6	Ret	7	5	6	11	6	2	6	7	10	3	7	7	DNS	DNS	41
4	(Italy) Vanni Racing/Traini Corse			7	14			3	3	12	13	11	8	7	Ret					41
5	(Italy) Auto Sport Racing	Ret	7	5	9	6	8	8	2	10	11	10	12	8	6	8	Ret	7	5	39
5	(Italy) Auto Sport Racing	8	3	DNS	Ret	4	3	5	7	Ret	10	13	6	9	9					39
6	(Italy) Avelon Formula	7	12	10	4	DSQ	Ret	Ret	8	2	4	12	3			Ret	11			20
6	(Italy) Avelon Formula	DNS	DNS	Ret	10	Ret	9	10	10	11	Ret	Ret	9	Ret	7	9	8	9	8	20
7	(Belgium) Team Astromega			3	8	5	11													10
7	(Belgium) Team Astromega					10	Ret													10
8	(Italy) Coloni Rookies Team													11	5	10	Ret	10	9	2
9	(Italy) Scuderia Famà	11	10	8	12															1
10	(Italy) Facondini Racing			DNS	DNS													Ret	10	0
10	(Italy) Facondini Racing															Ret	DNS			0
11	(Hungary) Szász Motorsport							13	Ret											0
Pos	Team	ADR (Italy)		IMO (Italy)		SPA (Belgium)		HUN (Hungary)		MUG (Italy)		SIL (United Kingdom)		CAT (Spain)		VLL (Italy)		MIS (Italy)		Points

Colour	Result
Gold	Winner
Silver	Second place
Bronze	Third place
Green	Points classification
Blue	Non-points classification
Blue	Non-classified finish (NC)
Purple	Retired, not classified (Ret)
Red	Did not qualify (DNQ)
Red	Did not pre-qualify (DNPQ)
Black	Disqualified (DSQ)
White	Did not start (DNS)
White	Withdrew (WD)
White	Race cancelled (C)
Blank	Did not practice (DNP)
Blank	Did not arrive (DNA)
Blank	Excluded (EX)

**Bold** - Pole
Italics - Fastest Lap
