= 2004 Grand Prix of Portorož =

The 2004 Grand Prix of Portorož was a non-championship Formula 3000 race held on a temporary circuit at Portorož Airport, Portorož, Slovenia on 2 October 2004.

It was contested over five laps by eight drivers from four Italian teams that had contested that year's International F3000 championship: Coloni Motorsport, CMS Performance, Durango and AEZ IE Engineering. All eight drivers used Lola B02/50 chassis with Zytek engines, as in the championship.

Austrian driver Patrick Friesacher won the race for Coloni, with Italians Matteo Meneghello and Matteo Bobbi second and third respectively for CMS.

== Race result ==
Pos	Driver	Team
1	(Austria) Patrick Friesacher	Coloni
2	(Italy) Matteo Meneghello	CMS Performance
3	(Italy) Matteo Bobbi	CMS Performance
4	(Venezuela) E. J. Viso	Durango Formula
5	(Italy) Michele Rugolo	Durango Formula
6	(Italy) Matteo Grassotto	AEZ IE Engineering
7	(Italy) Alex Ciompi	Coloni
8	(Italy) Riccardo Azzoli	AEZ IE Engineering
