= 2005 Italian Formula 3000 Championship =

Seasons
- ← 2004 2006 →

The 2005 Trofeo Nazionale C.S.A.I. Formula 3000 Italia was contested over 8 rounds. 9 different teams and 26 different drivers competed. In this one-make formula all drivers had to utilize Lola B02/50-Zytek chassis/engine combination. This season also saw a Light Class running older Lola B99/50-Zytek chassis/engine combination.. In the Light Class, 11 different drivers competed, but only one of them for the whole season.

The scoring system was 10-8-6-5-4-3-2-1 points awarded to the first eight finishers. Additional points were given to the driver who achieved pole position (1 extra point) and to the driver who led the greatest numer of laps in the race (1 extra point).

== Driver and Team Lineup ==
Team	No.	Driver	Rounds
Main Class
(Italy) Fisichella Motorsport	1	(Italy) Luca Filippi	All
(Italy) Fisichella Motorsport	2	(Italy) Alex Ciompi	All
(Spain) BCN Competicion	3	(Argentina) Matías Russo	1-3
(Spain) BCN Competicion	3	(Italy) Raffaele Gianmaria	4, 6
(Spain) BCN Competicion	4	(Italy) Matteo Grassotto	1
(Spain) BCN Competicion	4	(Italy) Matteo Cressoni	3-5
(Belgium) Team Astromega	5	(Finland) Toni Vilander	1-5
(Belgium) Team Astromega	5	(China) Qinghua Ma	8
(Belgium) Team Astromega	6	(Italy) Giacomo Ricci	All
(Italy) GP Racing	7	(Italy) Fabrizio Del Monte	1-3
(Italy) GP Racing	7	(United Kingdom) Alex Lloyd	4-5
(Italy) GP Racing	7	(Finland) Toni Vilander	6-8
(Italy) GP Racing	8	(Uruguay) Juan Cáceres	All
(Italy) Durango	9	(Germany) Maro Engel	3-7
(Italy) Durango	9	(Germany) Christian Danner	8
(Italy) Durango	10	(Brazil) Christiano Rocha	7
(Italy) Durango	10	(Italy) Giuliano de Magryres	8
(Italy) Euronova Racing	11	(Italy) Giacomo Piccini	4-6
(Italy) Euronova Racing	12	(Italy) Riccardo Mari	5
(Italy) Sighinolfi	14	(Italy) Matteo Pellegrino	1
(Italy) Sighinolfi	14	(Germany) Michael Vorba	2
(Italy) Sighinolfi	14	(Venezuela) Pastor Maldonado	3-6
(Italy) Sighinolfi	14	(Italy) Giacomo Piccini	7
(Italy) Sighinolfi	14	(Italy) Gabriele Lancieri	8
(Italy) Sighinolfi	15	(Austria) Bernhard Auinger	1-5, 7
(Italy) Sighinolfi	15	(Spain) Emilio de Villota Jr.	8
(Czech Republic) Ma-Con Engineering	16	(Germany) Michael Vorba	1
(Czech Republic) Ma-Con Engineering	16	(Czech Republic) Jarek Janis	2-8
(Czech Republic) Ma-Con Engineering	17	(Czech Republic) Jan Charouz	1-6
Light Class
(Italy) Discovery Racing	21	(Italy) Andrea Belicchi	1
(Italy) Discovery Racing	21	(Italy) Riccardo Mardo	3-4
(Italy) Vanni Racing/Traini Corse	23	(Italy) Stefano Gattuso	All
(Italy) Il Motori di Carlotta	25	(Italy) Giuseppe Strano	1-2, 4-6
(Italy) Il Motori di Carlotta	26	(Italy) Glauco Solieri	6-8
(Italy) Azeta Racing	27	(Italy) Alessandro Vitacolonna	1
(Italy) Azeta Racing	27	(Italy) Giovanni Berton	2-3
(Italy) Azeta Racing	28	(Algeria) Nassim Sidi Said	5
(Italy) Euronova Racing	29	(Italy) Giuseppe Chiminelli	5, 7-8
(Italy) Euronova Racing	31	(Belgium) Jérôme d'Ambrosio	6
(Italy) Euronova Racing	32	(Italy) Luca DiCienzo	6-7

== Calendar ==
All races were held in Italy, excluding round at Brno in Czech Republic.

Round	Circuit	Date	Laps	Distance	Time	Speed
1	Adria	17 April	34	2.702=91.868 km	0'40:07.777	137.357 km/h
2	Vallelunga	8 May	32	3.734=119.488 km	0'39:50.381	179.953 km/h
3	Brno	5 June	22	5.403=118.866 km	0'40:54.994	174.305 km/h
4	Imola	19 June	24	4.933=118.392 km	0'42:22.661	167.624 km/h
5	Mugello	3 July	24	5.245=125.88 km	0'43:41.038	172.896 km/h
6	Magione	24 July	30	2.507=75.21 km	0'33:26.305	134.953 km/h
7	Monza	25 September	20	5.793=115.86 km	0'34:01.412	204.317 km/h
8	Misano	23 October	29	4.06=117.74 km	0'40:27.829	174.586 km/h

== Results ==
Round	Circuit	Pole Position	Fastest Lap	Winning Driver	Winning Team
1	Adria	(Finland) Toni Vilander	M: (Italy) Alex Ciompi; L: (Italy) Andrea Belicchi	(Italy) Alex Ciompi	(Italy) Fisichella Motorsport
2	Vallelunga	(Italy) Luca Filippi	M: (Finland) Toni Vilander; L: (Italy) Stefano Gattuso	(Finland) Toni Vilander	(Belgium) Team Astromega
3	Brno	(Italy) Luca Filippi	M: (Italy) Luca Filippi; L: (Italy) Stefano Gattuso	(Italy) Luca Filippi	(Italy) Fisichella Motorsport
4	Imola	(Italy) Luca Filippi	M: (Italy) Luca Filippi; L: (Italy) Stefano Gattuso	(Italy) Luca Filippi	(Italy) Fisichella Motorsport
5	Mugello	(Italy) Luca Filippi	M: (Italy) Luca Filippi; L: (Italy) Stefano Gattuso	(Italy) Luca Filippi	(Italy) Fisichella Motorsport
6	Magione	(Venezuela) Pastor Maldonado	M: (Venezuela) Pastor Maldonado; L: (Italy) Stefano Gattuso	(Venezuela) Pastor Maldonado	(Italy) Sighinolfi
7	Monza	(Czech Republic) Jaroslav Janiš	M: (Germany) Maro Engel; L: (Italy) Stefano Gattuso	(Italy) Luca Filippi	(Italy) Fisichella Motorsport
8	Misano	(Czech Republic) Jaroslav Janiš	M: (Italy) Giacomo Ricci; L: (Italy) Stefano Gattuso	(Czech Republic) Jaroslav Janiš	(Czech Republic) Ma-Con Engineering

== Final points standings ==
=== Driver ===
==== Main championship ====
For every race points were awarded: 10 points to the winner, 8 for runner-up, 6 for third place, 5 for fourth place, winding down to 1 point for 8th place. Additional points were awarded to the pole winner (1 point) and to the driver leading the most laps (1 point). Light Class drivers were also able to score points in the main class.

Pos	Driver	ADR (Italy)	VLL (Italy)	BRN (Czech Republic)	IMO (Italy)	MUG (Italy)	UMB (Italy)	MNZ (Italy)	MIS (Italy)	Pts
1	(Italy) Luca Filippi	3	Ret	1	1	1	5	1	2	65
2	(Czech Republic) Jarek Janis		2	Ret	3	6	3	2	1	43
3	(Italy) Giacomo Ricci	Ret	3	2	9	3	7	5	3	33
4	(Finland) Toni Vilander	Ret	1	Ret	Ret	Ret	2	6	Ret	23
5	(Uruguay) Juan Cáceres	5	5	3	8	Ret	9	10	4	20
6	(Italy) Alex Ciompi	1	Ret	Ret	Ret	2	Ret	9	10	19
7	(Germany) Maro Engel			6	4	Ret	6	4		17
8	(Italy) Fabrizio Del Monte	2	4	7						15
9	(Venezuela) Pastor Maldonado			Ret	Ret	7	1			14
10	(Italy) Raffaele Gianmaria				2		4			13
11	(Czech Republic) Jan Charouz	6	6	10	5	9	11			10
12	(Italy) Matteo Cressoni			4	Ret	5				9
13	(Austria) Bernhard Auinger	Ret	Ret	5	6	Ret				8
14	(Brazil) Christiano Rocha							3		6
15	(Italy) Giacomo Piccini				7	8	8	7		6
16	(United Kingdom) Alex Lloyd				Ret	4				5
17	(Italy) Andrea Belicchi	4								5
18	(Italy) Stefano Gattuso	8	7	9	10	10	13	11	7	5
19	(Italy) Gabriele Lancieri								5	4
20	(Spain) Emilio de Villota Jr.								6	3
21	(Argentina) Matías Russo	7	10	8						3
22	(Germany) Michael Vorba	Ret	8							1
23	(Germany) Christian Danner								8	1
24	(Italy) Glauco Solieri						10	12	9	0
25	(Italy) Giuseppe Strano	9	9		Ret	Ret	Ret			0
26	(Italy) Giovanni Berton		Ret	11						0
27	(China) Qinghua Ma								11	0
28	(Algeria) Nassim Sidi Said					11				0
29	(Italy) Giuseppe Chiminelli					12		13	Ret	0
30	(Italy) Riccardo Mari			12	Ret	Ret				0
31	(Italy) Giuliano de Magryres								12	0
32	(Belgium) Jérôme d'Ambrosio						12			0
33	(Italy) Luca DiCienzo						Ret	Ret		0
34	(Italy) Matteo Grassotto	Ret								0
35	(Italy) Matteo Pellegrino	Ret								0
36	(Italy) Alessandro Vitacolonna	Ret								0
Pos	Driver	ADR (Italy)	VLL (Italy)	BRN (Czech Republic)	IMO (Italy)	MUG (Italy)	UMB (Italy)	MNZ (Italy)	MIS (Italy)	Pts

==== Light Class championship ====
Pos	Driver	ADR (Italy)	VLL (Italy)	BRN (Czech Republic)	IMO (Italy)	MUG (Italy)	UMB (Italy)	MNZ (Italy)	MIS (Italy)	Pts
1	(Italy) Stefano Gattuso	8	7	9	10	10	13	11	7	87
2	(Italy) Glauco Solieri						10	12	9	26
3	(Italy) Giuseppe Strano	9	9		Ret	Ret	Ret			14
4	(Italy) Andrea Belicchi	4								12
5	(Italy) Giuseppe Chiminelli					12		13	Ret	12
6	(Belgium) Jérôme d'Ambrosio						12			9
7	(Italy) Giovanni Berton		Ret	11						8
8	(Algeria) Nassim Sidi Said					11				8
9	(Italy) Ricardo Mari			12	Ret					6
10	(Italy) Luca DiCienzo						Ret	Ret		0
11	(Italy) Alessandro Vitacolonna	Ret								0
Pos	Driver	ADR (Italy)	VLL (Italy)	BRN (Czech Republic)	IMO (Italy)	MUG (Italy)	MAG (Italy)	MNZ (Italy)	MIS (Italy)	Pts

Points system see above.

=== Teams ===
==== Main ====
Pos	Team	ADR (Italy)	VLL (Italy)	BRN (Czech Republic)	IMO (Italy)	MUG (Italy)	MAG (Italy)	MNZ (Italy)	MIS (Italy)	Pts
1	(Italy) Fisichella Motor Sport	3	Ret	1	1	1	5	1	2	84
1	(Italy) Fisichella Motor Sport	1	Ret	Ret	Ret	2	Ret	9	10	84
2	(Czech Republic) Ma-Con Engineering	Ret	2	Ret	3	6	3	2	1	53
2	(Czech Republic) Ma-Con Engineering	6	6	10	5	9	11			53
3	(Italy) GP Racing	2	4	7	Ret	4	2	6	Ret	51
3	(Italy) GP Racing	5	5	3	8	Ret	9	10	4	51
4	(Belgium) Team Astromega	Ret	1	Ret	Ret	Ret			11	45
4	(Belgium) Team Astromega	Ret	3	2	9	3	7	5	3	45
5	(Italy) Sighinolfi	Ret	8	Ret	Ret	7	1	7	5	31
5	(Italy) Sighinolfi	Ret	Ret	5	6	Ret		8	6	31
6	(Spain) BCN Competición	7	10	8	2		4			25
6	(Spain) BCN Competición	Ret		4	Ret	5				25
7	(Italy) Durango			6	4	Ret	6	4	8	24
7	(Italy) Durango							3	12	24
8	(Italy) Discovery Racing	4		12	Ret					5
9	(Italy) Vanni Racing/Traini Corse	8	7	9	10	10	13	11	7	5
10	(Italy) Euronova Racing				7	8	8	13	Ret	4
10	(Italy) Euronova Racing					12	12	Ret		4
11	(Italy) Il Motori Di Carlotta	9	9		Ret	Ret	Ret			0
11	(Italy) Il Motori Di Carlotta						10	12	9	0
12	(Italy) Azerta	Ret	Ret	11		11				0
Pos	Team	ADR (Italy)	VLL (Italy)	BRN (Czech Republic)	IMO (Italy)	MUG (Italy)	MAG (Italy)	MNZ (Italy)	MIS (Italy)	Pts

==== Light ====
Pos	Team	ADR (Italy)	VLL (Italy)	BRN (Czech Republic)	IMO (Italy)	MUG (Italy)	MAG (Italy)	MNZ (Italy)	MIS (Italy)	Pts
1	(Italy) Vanni Racing/Traini Corse	8	7	9	10	10	13	11	7	87
2	(Italy) Il Motori Di Carlotta	9	9		Ret	Ret	Ret			40
2	(Italy) Il Motori Di Carlotta						10	12	9	40
3	(Italy) Euronova Racing					12	12	13	Ret	21
3	(Italy) Euronova Racing						Ret	Ret		21
4	(Italy) Discovery Racing	4		12	Ret					18
5	(Italy) Azerta	Ret	Ret	11		11				16
Pos	Team	ADR (Italy)	VLL (Italy)	BRN (Czech Republic)	IMO (Italy)	MUG (Italy)	UMB (Italy)	MNZ (Italy)	MIS (Italy)	Pts
