= 2017 Montreal ePrix =

Race 11 of 12 of the 2016–17 Formula E Championship
← Previous race
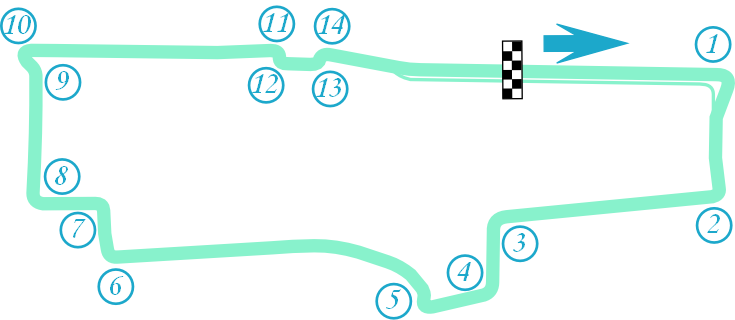

Race details
- Date: 29 July 2017
- Official name: 2017 FIA Formula E Hydro-Québec Montréal ePrix
- Location: Montreal Street Circuit, Montreal, Quebec
- Course: Street circuit
- Course length: 2.745 km (1.706 miles)
- Distance: 35 laps, 96.075 km (59.698 miles)
- Weather: Dry with air temperatures approaching 24.1 °C (75.4 °F); wind speeds up to 11.1 kilometres per hour (6.9 mph)

Pole position
Driver	(Brazil) Lucas di Grassi	Audi Sport ABT
- Time: 1:22.869

Fastest lap
Driver	(France) Loïc Duval	Dragon-Penske
- Time: 1:24.536 on lap 19

Podium
First	(Brazil) Lucas di Grassi	Audi Sport ABT
Second	(France) Jean-Éric Vergne	Techeetah-Renault
Third	(France) Stéphane Sarrazin	Techeetah-Renault

The 2017 Montreal ePrix (formally the 2017 FIA Formula E Hydro-Québec Montréal ePrix) was a pair of Formula E electric car races held on 29 and 30 July 2017 at the Montreal Street Circuit in Montreal, Quebec before a two-day crowd of 45,000 people. They were the 11th and 12th races of the 2016–17 Formula E Championship and the only running of the event. The first 35-lap race contested on 29 July, was won by Audi Sport ABT driver Lucas di Grassi from pole position. The Techeetah duo of Jean-Éric Vergne and Stéphane Sarrazin finished in second and third places. The longer 37-lap race held on 31 July was won by Vergne from a third place start. Mahindra's Felix Rosenqvist took second with Virgin driver José María López third.

Di Grassi won pole position for the first race by recording the fastest lap in qualifying and held off Sarrazin to maintain the lead at the start and pulled away from the field. Attention focused on Sébastien Buemi, demoted from second to twelfth for changing his battery, who sustained steering arm damage on the first lap but was able to move up the field during the course of the race. It was neutralised with a full course yellow flag when Loïc Duval and Nick Heidfeld collided on the 14th lap. Most drivers made pit stops to switch into a second car and di Grassi kept the lead after this phase. Sarrazin ceded second to teammate Vergne who began to draw closer to di Grassi but his chase was neutralised when López crashed on lap 24, necessitating the safety car's deployment. Di Grassi kept the lead at the restart and held off Vergne for the rest of the race to take his second victory of the season and the sixth of his career. No lead changes occurred, as di Grassi was the only driver to lead laps in the first race.

Rosenqvist was the fastest driver for qualifying for the second race and maintained the lead on the first lap. After Sarrazin spun at the first turn from contact with Daniel Abt and Nelson Piquet Jr., Buemi was hit from behind by António Félix da Costa, damaging his right-rear wheel guard which flailed in the wind before detaching. Buemi was required to make a pit stop, dropping him down the order. With more electrical energy to use, Vergne began attacking Rosenqvist for the lead after ten laps. Vergne took the lead for one lap when the change into second cars began on the 18th lap. After the pit stops, Rosenqvist reclaimed the lead with a five-second lead over Vergne who began regaining the lost time having made his pit stop one lap later than the former. Vergne again had more usable electrical energy and overtook the slower Rosenqvist on the 29th lap. Vergne maintained the lead to claim his first Formula E victory. There were four lead changes among three different drivers during the course of the second race.

Di Grassi overturned Buemi's lead in the Drivers' Championship to become the third champion in Formula E history by 24 points. Rosenqvist finished the season in third place, five points ahead of Sam Bird. Vergne's form in both races consolidated his hold on fifth position. Despite its poor form in the second race, e.Dams-Renault secured their third consecutive Teams' Championship by 20 points over Audi Sport ABT. Mahindra finished the season in third with Virgin a further 25 points behind in fourth. Techeetah's performance in both races allowed the team to consolidate fifth place.

== Background to race weekend ==
=== Preview ===
Before the race, e.Dams-Renault driver Sébastien Buemi led the Drivers' Championship with 157 points, ten ahead of Lucas di Grassi in second, who in turn, was a further 43 in front of third-placed Felix Rosenqvist. Sam Bird was fourth on 100 points and Nico Prost was fifth with 84 points. e.Dams-Renault led the Teams' Championship with 259 points; Audi Sport ABT were in second place on 194 points and Mahindra with 182 points contended the team for the position. With 153 points, Virgin were in fourth position and Techeetah rounded out the top five with 94 points. A maximum of 59 points were available for the final ePrix which meant di Grassi could still win the title if he won both races and Buemi placed second twice without taking two pole positions.

After reducing Buemi's lead by 22 points in the preceding New York City ePrix, di Grassi stated his team had to improve vastly in finding hope of winning the championship in Montreal and felt more confident than before: "With the experience that I have with Formula E, you know that it can go from hell to heaven any weekend, any race. We just have to do our best, try and win both races and see how it goes." Buemi, the pre-title favourite, missed the New York City races because of a World Endurance Championship commitment at the Nürburgring, but said he would prepare for the Montreal double header in the same way he would with any other event: "We will try to do the best possible. I hope we can finish this season in style and look forward to it." He created controversy when he raised the issue of his crash with di Grassi at the 2016 London ePrix, saying a similar collision would be difficult for di Grassi to explain and not to do it again." Di Grassi responded by noting Buemi lost the first season championship through an error and said Buemi had more pressure and another mistake would prevent him from reclaiming the title: "Everyone feels pressure in a different way of course. He has pressure big time this weekend, much more than me, this is because everyone will be waiting to see if those mistakes come again in Montreal."

=== Preparation ===
In September 2014 Denis Coderre, the Mayor of Montreal, entered into advance talks with Jean Todt, the president of motorsport's governing body, the Fédération Internationale de l'Automobile (FIA) over holding a motor race in the city. Although it was mooted the Circuit Gilles Villeneuve would host the race, Coderre preferred a city centre track. After flying to Miami to meet with Formula E holding's executive director in March 2015, Corderre said two months later that "informal agreements" had been reached with series promoters, allowing racing to be held in Montreal's streets. Planning for the event began in January 2016, and a six-year contract was signed with an option for a renewal available after half the time had passed. The round was later confirmed as part of Formula E's 2016–17 schedule in September 2016 by the FIA World Motor Sport Council as a double header. They were the 11th and 12th single-seater electric car races of the Championship, and were held on 29 and 30 July 2017 at the Montreal Street Circuit. The city expected 60,000 people to attend the two-day event.

Prior to the double header, Formula One had visited the Circuit Gilles Villeneuve intermittently since 1978 and it was the first time the Formula E title was decided anywhere other than the Battersea Park Street Circuit in London. The first pictures of the 14-turn 2.75 km (1.71 mi) track layout were released to the press on 21 October 2016. Construction of the grandstands and paddock for the race started on 15 July, two weeks before the first ePrix. The circuit foundations were completely dismantled ten days after it had ended. Race ambassador and former driver Patrick Carpentier believed the track's layout would challenge drivers and felt the best place for overtaking would occur into the first turn. Drivers voiced positive feelings about the track. Di Grassi called it possibly "one of the best tracks in Formula E history" and Rosenqvist said it appeared "fantastic" because of its elevation change which is in contrast to most Formula E circuits which are held on flat surfaces. However, local residents complained about the lack of access, and the track's use of public streets and sidewalks for private purposes was questioned.

== Race one ==
=== Practice and qualifying ===
Two practice sessions—both on Saturday morning—were held before the late afternoon race. The first session ran for 45 minutes and the second for half an hour. Both practice sessions took place in dry and warm weather conditions. Di Grassi recorded the first practice session's fastest lap at 1 minute, 22.451 seconds on 200 kW (270 hp) of power, almost 1.2 seconds faster than Bird in second. Jean-Éric Vergne, Buemi, Nico Prost, Rosenqvist. Stéphane Sarrazin, Mitch Evans, Daniel Abt and Nelson Piquet Jr. were in positions three to ten. The track's surface caught several drivers off guard after locking their tyres, causing them to slide onto the run-off areas, and an oversteer affected multiple cars. Abt broke his car's left-front rim following an collision with a barrier lining the track. In the second practice session, Prost was quickest with a time of 1 minute and 22.180 seconds; Vergne, Rosenqvist, Sarrazin, Heidfeld, Bird, Loïc Duval (Dragon), Robin Frijns (Andretti) and the two NextEV cars of Oliver Turvey and Piquet completed the top ten. Di Grassi and Adam Carroll skidded under braking on dust and slid onto the track's run-off areas. Sarrazin later stopped at the pit lane exit but restarted his car without external aid. Buemi glanced the Bus Stop chicane inside barrier, and speared straight into the exit wall at high speed. Buemi was unhurt and exited his car without external assistance. Because his vehicle was significantly damaged, he drove his second car for qualifying. The crash prompted the session to end prematurely with five minutes left due to extensive damage to the barrier and debris strewn across the circuit. e.Dams-Renault mechanics worked for the next five hours to build a new car around a spare monocoque.

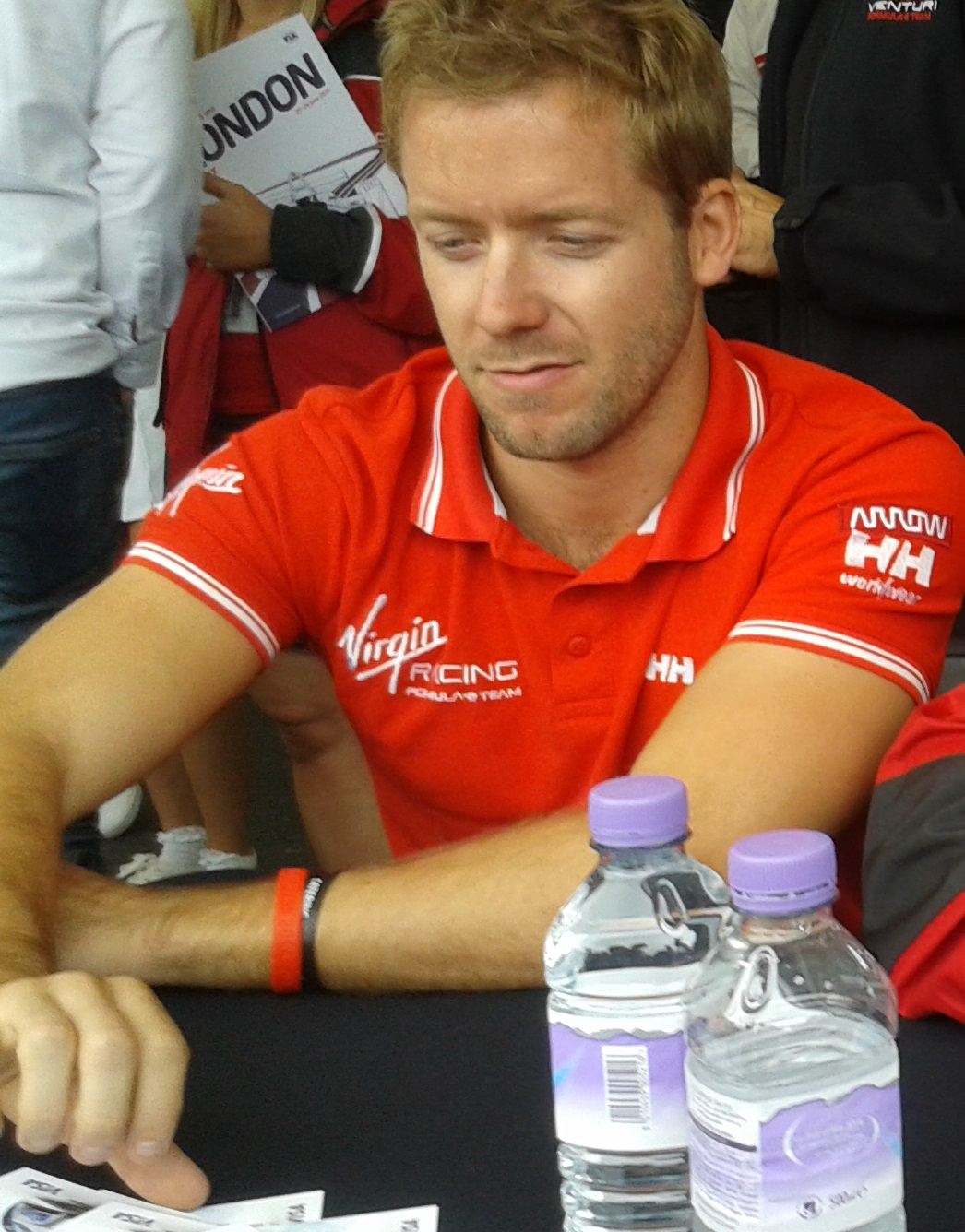
Sam Bird (pictured in 2015) could not use the maximum power available to him and qualified down the field.

Saturday's afternoon qualifying session ran for an hour and was divided into four groups of five cars. Each group was determined by a lottery system and was permitted six minutes of on-track activity. All drivers were limited to two timed laps with one at maximum power. The fastest five overall competitors in the four groups participated in a "Super Pole" session with one driver on the track at any time going out in reverse order from fifth to first. Each of the five drivers was limited to one timed lap and the starting order was determined by the competitor's fastest lap times (Super Pole from first to fifth, and group qualifying from sixth to twentieth). The driver and team who recorded the fastest time were awarded three points towards their respective championships. Qualifying was held in dry and warm weather conditions, and the track appeared slower than in practice. In the first group of five runners, where drivers waited 3½ minutes before venturing onto the track, Duval was fastest, three-tenths of a seconds quicker than Abt. Bird in third could not use the maximum amount of power available to him due to a mapping issue. Piquet locked his tyres on his maximum power lap, and Jérôme d'Ambrosio was the first group's slowest (and overall) driver as he failed to reach the timing line to start his full power lap. Track conditions improved in the second group which saw the five drivers wait until the final seconds to begin their maximum power laps. Sarrazin recorded the fastest lap; Prost and Frijns followed in second and third. António Félix da Costa attacked but struggled with understeer and slid his car to go half a second slower than Sarrazin. José María López was the second group's slowest participant after a similar mapping error to his teammate Bird slowed him.

In the third group, di Grassi set the fastest overall lap of any driver at 1 minute, 23.026 seconds. He was followed by Buemi and Rosenqvist in second and third. Vergne made an error en route to fourth place and Evans was the third group's slowest competitor. Carroll was fastest in the fourth group with Turvey, Tom Dillmann Heidfeld and Engel in second to fifth. Heidfeld was slow due to an error through the first turn and Engel appeared to have a similar problem to both Virgin cars. After group qualifying ended, the lap times set by di Grassi, Buemi, Sarrazin, Rosenqvist and Prost progressed them to super pole. Di Grassi took his third pole position of the season with a time of 1 minute, 22.869 seconds, despite losing four hundredths of a second in the first sector but regained time in the second sector. He was joined on the grid's front row by Buemi who was 0.196 seconds slower. Sarrazin took third place by judging the first braking point correctly and demonstrated strong rear grip despite losing seven hundredths of a second through a driver error. Although he had a small amount of oversteer which cost him time Prost secured fourth. Rosenqvist locked his rear brakes going into the first corner, losing him one second worth of time and took fifth. After qualifying, Buemi was demoted ten places on the grid because he changed his car's battery after his second practice crash. Following the application of penalties, the rest of the grid lined up as Vergne, Evans, Carroll, Turvey, Dillmann, Duval, Abt, Buemi, Frijns, Heidfeld, Félix da Costa, López, Engel, Bird, Piquet and d'Ambrosio.

=== Race ===
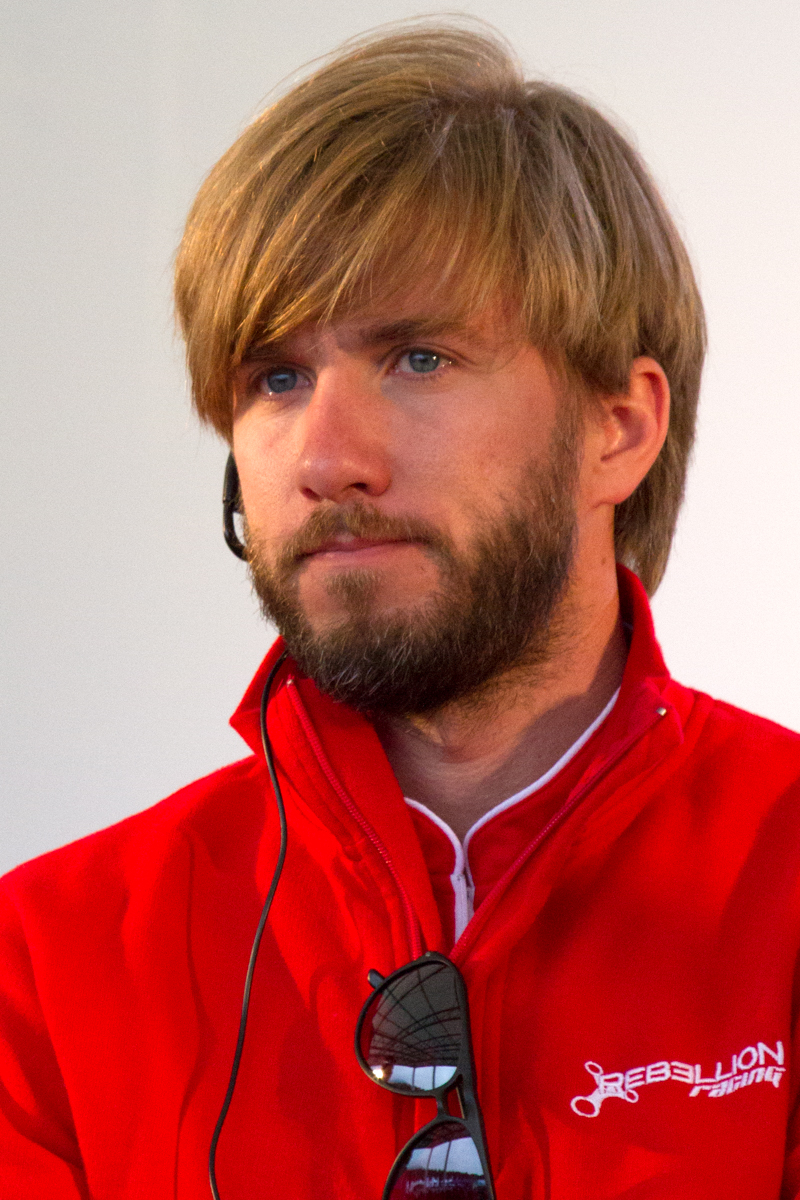
Nick Heidfeld (pictured in 2014) retired after 14 laps due to a collision with Loïc Duval.

The weather at the start was dry with the air temperature between 24.10 to 24.55 °C (75.38 to 76.19 °F) and a track temperature from 28.90 to 29.45 °C (84.02 to 85.01 °F). A special feature of Formula E is the "Fan Boost" feature, an additional 100 kilowatts (130 hp) of power to use in the driver's second car. The three drivers who were allowed to use the boost were determined by a fan vote. For the first Montreal race, di Grassi, Vergne and Buemi were handed the extra power. When the race began at 16:00 Eastern Daylight Time (UTC−04:00), di Grassi held off Sarrazin to lead the field at the first corner. Buemi drove conservatively resulting in him being delayed in a closely bunched pack of cars in the middle of the field. He sustained handling damage from contact with Frijns's front-left wheel in the second turn and fell to 16th place. Evans and his teammate Carroll made fast getaways and moved to fourth and eighth. Prost struggled at the start and lost two positions to fall to sixth position after making contact with one of the Jaguar cars. Heidfeld gained four positions by the end of the first lap while Buemi lost four places over the same distance.

At the end of the first lap, di Grassi led Sarrazin, Rosenqvist, Evans, Vergne, Prost, Carroll, Turvey, Duval, and Dillmann. Di Grassi began to pull away from the rest of the field. Rosenqvist pressured Sarrazin but the latter defended third place. Attention switched to Buemi who began to move through the field. He put his left hand on his steering wheel against his bent steering arm. Heidfeld and Abt were able to enter the top-ten and both battled for position. Abt passed Heidfeld for ninth place on lap nine. After ten laps Buemi had passed four drivers to be in 12th place. After Buemi had overtaken Duval for tenth position on the 14th lap, Heidfeld attempted to pass Duval on the outside, but Duval defended his position, leaving Heidfeld without any space on some dirt and the two made contact at turn six. Duval resumed but Heidfeld's front-right suspension was bent and drove to the side of the track at turn 12 to retire. Heidfeld's stricken car prompted the activation of the full course yellow procedure to allow marshals to remove it from the circuit and most drivers elected to make pit stops for the mandatory change into their second cars.

Buemi and Abt were the first drivers to enter the pit lane to try and pass drivers through an alternative strategy. Buemi was close behind the rear of Abt's car and made minor contact with the slow-moving Abt, gesticulating angrily. Buemi was released from his pit stall alongside Abt, and passed him. Abt then applied his brakes to avoid hitting Buemi. After Buemi appeared to slow at the pit lane exit, Abt drove into the rear of his car, prompting Buemi to complain furiously over the radio. Rosenqvist's pit stop was two seconds longer than expected and fell behind Vergne. Having opted not to make a pit stop under the full course yellow which concluded on lap 17, Carroll moved into the top ten, and rejoined in 14th after making his pit stop. Sarrazin later allowed Vergne through to take over second place. Duval recorded the race's fastest lap on lap 19. He set a lap of 1 minute, 24.536 seconds, earning him one championship point.

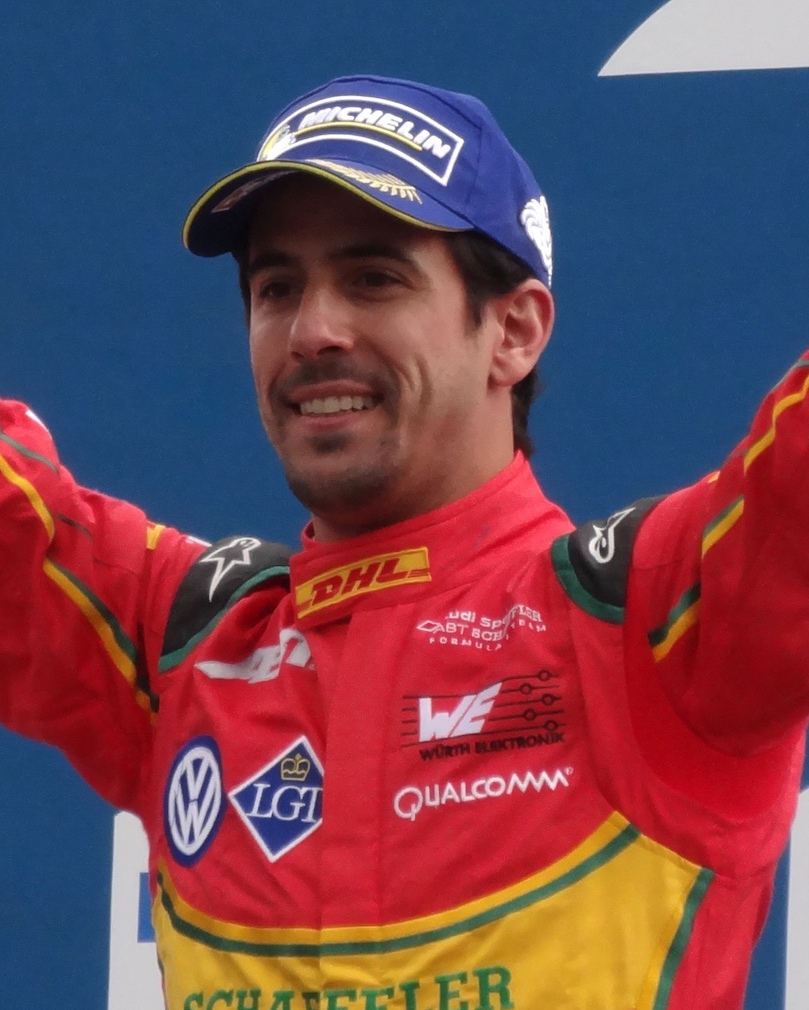
Lucas di Grassi (pictured in 2016) started from pole position and led every lap to win the first race.

At the front, Vergne began to reduce the time deficit to di Grassi. Buemi overtook Turvey for seventh place on lap 21 and he passed Evans two laps later but could not establish a healthy advantage over Abt. López lost control of his car's rear on lap 24, and spun into the turn eight wall, necessitating the deployment of the safety car, and eliminating the time gaps in the field. The safety car was withdrawn at the end of lap 29, and racing resumed as di Grassi used his FanBoost to pull clear from Vergne whom Sarrazin challenged. Prost allowed his teammate Buemi through to fifth place. Abt aggressively overtook Prost soon after for sixth and continued his goal of drawing closer to Buemi. On the 31st lap, Rosenqvist, who aimed for a podium position, struck the wall exiting the chicane, damaging his left-rear suspension and bending his car's steering arm. This allowed Buemi to take over fourth place as Rosenqvist fell down the order.

Vergne drew close to di Grassi and was close behind him in the final two laps. He attempted to overtake di Grassi but the latter defended the lead. Buemi closed up to Sarrazin on the final lap but a battle that saw wheel-to-wheel contact meant he could not pass Sarrazin in the turn six to eight complex. Vergne continued to push di Grassi for the rest of the race but was not able to draw close enough to mount a serious attempt at passing, and di Grassi took his second victory of the season and the sixth of his career. Vergne finished three-tenths of a second behind in second with teammate Sarrazin third. Buemi was fourth on the road, ahead of Abt in fifth and Bird who gained 12 positions over the course of the event to take sixth. Prost, Evans, Frijns, and the limping Rosenqvist rounded out the top ten. Dillmann, d'Ambrosio, Engel, Piquet and Félix da Costa. Turvey and Carroll were the final finishers. There were no lead changes during the race as di Grassi led every lap contested.

=== Post-race ===
The top three drivers appeared on the podium to collect their trophies and spoke to the media in a later press conference. Di Grassi was delighted with his victory, calling it "the best day in my Formula E career" and reserved praise for his team after they used much of their energy to understand their lack of competitiveness at the preceding New York City double header. He stated his belief the secret was to remain calm and "exercise what the driver could do to motivate everybody that person is surrounded by for the season's remaining races," "Formula E can go from heaven to hell in one lap or one decision or one problem. Today we did the job. Tomorrow is a completely different day, a completely different environment. We're going to try to do the same as we did here." Vergne was happy over his team's growing strength and their double podium finish. He said he was hit from both sides at the race's start, causing him to lose positions, but spoke highly of his car and strategy allowed him to go faster than other drivers. Third-place finisher Sarrazin stated he was slower and became aware of Buemi closing on him by glancing at his rear-view mirrors and the latter challenging for the title.

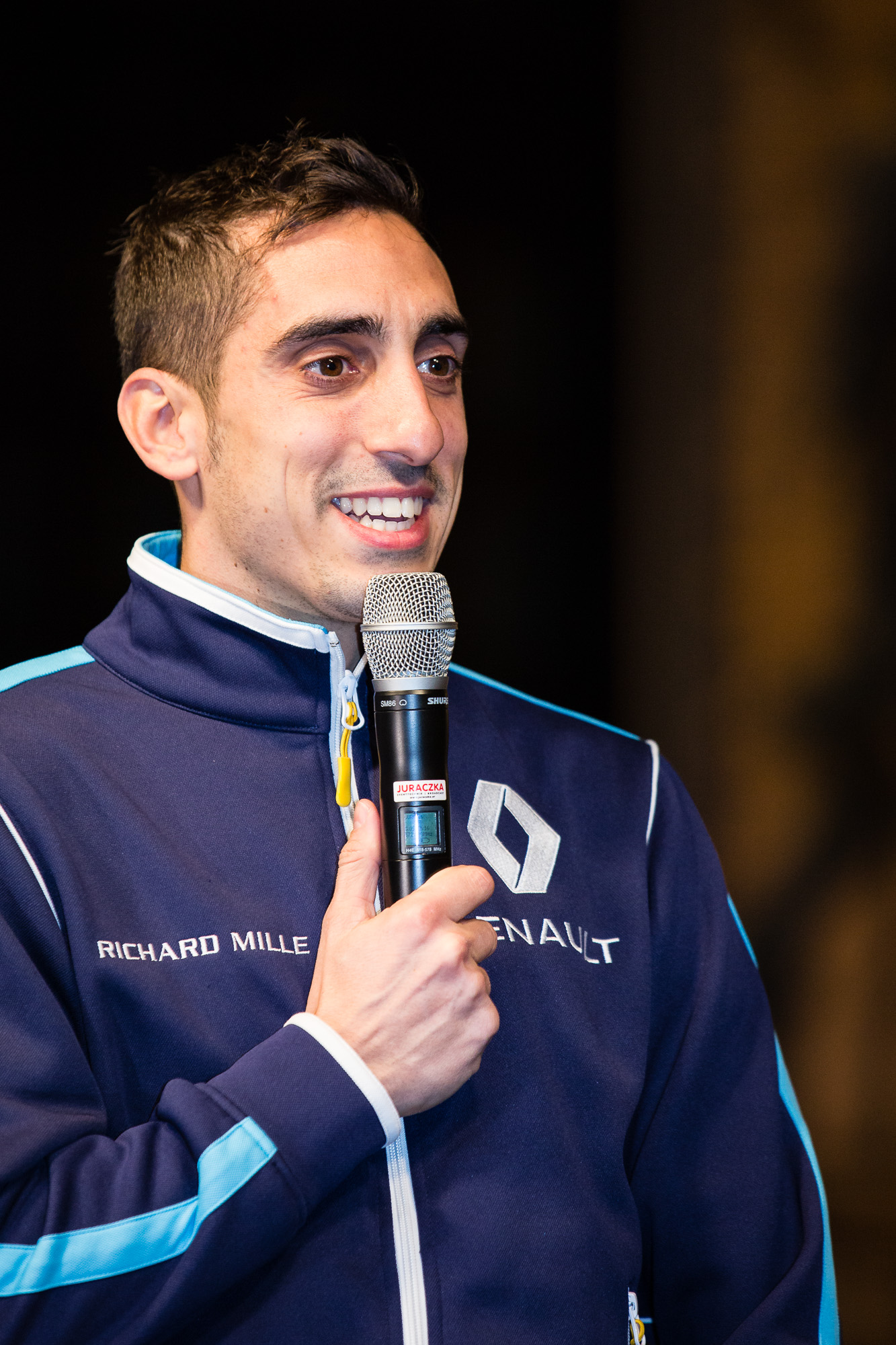
Sébastien Buemi (pictured in 2016) confronted three drivers after the race and was later disqualified for an underweight car.

After the race, the atmosphere in the pit lane became turbulent when a visibly angered Buemi went to Félix da Costa and accused him of breaking his car's steering in the second turn. When Félix da Costa replied he had not made contact, Buemi walked to Frijns and engaged in a heated argument. Frijns argued his choices were either hitting Buemi's rear wing or driving to the outside of him. Buemi countered this by accusing Frijns of being supercilious and swore at him. Buemi confronted Abt soon after and accused the latter of hitting him deliberately. When Buemi walked away, he turned to Abt and branded him "dirty". More than half an hour after the rant, Buemi called Audi Sport Abt "a dirty team" through the press and claimed they violated series regulations. Frijns was perplexed by Buemi's confrontation as he expected to be thanked by him and believed he avoided being caught up in a more serious incident, "I had actually already taken him before I turned in and I felt a small touch on the left rear but nothing much. Then five or six laps later he was behind me and I chose to let him go so I don't know what he is crying about." Ten days after the ePrix, Buemi apologised to his team and both Andretti drivers on Twitter.

Buemi, having risen from twelfth to finish fourth, was disqualified for infringing technical regulations as technical stewards in post-race scrutineering determined his second car was under the minimum weight limit of 880 kg (1,940 lb) and the team were reported to have added an additional 4 kg (8.8 lb) to compensate for any weight variation in his vehicle. This was partly due to the insufficient amount of time to get the car weighed after it was rebuilt from his accident in the second practice session. The team elected not to appeal the penalty. e.Dams-Renault team principal Jean-Paul Driot said he did not understand why the car's weight was not within the limit. He revealed the team attempted to file an appeal for a weighing of the battery but the large amount of difference in the component complicated the situation.

The result moved di Grassi into the lead of the Drivers' Championship with 175 points. Buemi fell to second and was 18 points behind di Grassi. Bird's fifth-place finish promoted him to third place with 110 points but was mathematically excluded from winning the championship. Rosenqvist's poor form dropped him from third to fourth and was also prevented from securing the title. Vergne and Prost were equal on points for fifth place. e.Dams-Renault still led the Teams' Championship on 267 points but their advantage over Audi Sport ABT was reduced to 33 points. Mahindra remained in third position but Virgin moved further towards the team while Techeetah consolidated fifth with one race left in the season. For the second event, Di Grassi only now needed to finish fifth or better to secure the championship regardless of where Buemi finished.

=== Standings after the race ===
- **Bold text** indicates who still had a theoretical chance of becoming Champion.

Drivers' Championship standings

+/–	Pos	Driver	Points
1	1	(Brazil) **Lucas di Grassi**	175
1	2	(Switzerland) **Sébastien Buemi**	157 (−18)
1	3	(United Kingdom) Sam Bird	110 (−65)
1	4	(Sweden) Felix Rosenqvist	106 (−69)
1	5	(France) Jean-Éric Vergne	92 (−83)

Teams' Championship standings

+/–	Pos	Constructor	Points
	1	(France) **e.Dams-Renault**	267
	2	(Germany) **Audi Sport ABT**	234 (−33)
	3	(India) Mahindra	184 (−83)
	4	(United Kingdom) Virgin-Citroën	163 (−104)
	5	(China) Techeetah-Renault	127 (−140)

- Notes: Only the top five positions are included for both sets of standings.

== Race two ==
2017 Montreal ePrix
Race 12 of 12 of the 2016–17 Formula E Championship
← Previous race
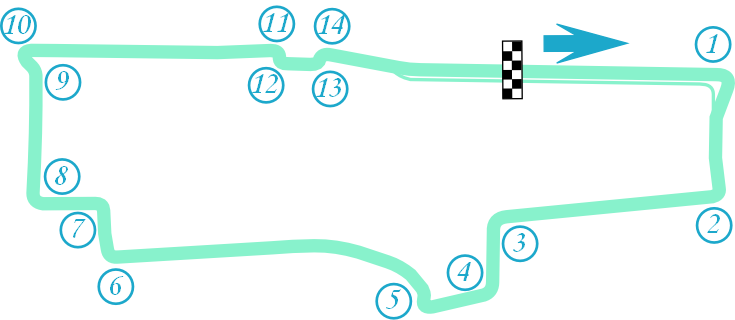

Race details
- Date: 30 July 2017
- Official name: 2017 FIA Formula E Hydro-Québec Montréal ePrix
- Location: Montreal Street Circuit, Montreal, Quebec
- Course: Street circuit
- Course length: 2.745 km (1.706 miles)
- Distance: 37 laps, 101.565 km (63.110 miles)
- Weather: Dry, Air: 27.05 to 27.75 °C (80.69 to 81.95 °F), Track: 30.55 and 31.10 °C (86.99 and 87.98 °F)

Pole position
Driver	(Sweden) Felix Rosenqvist	Mahindra
- Time: 1:22.344

Fastest lap
Driver	(France) Nico Prost	e.Dams-Renault
- Time: 1:23.444 on lap 28

Podium
First	(France) Jean-Éric Vergne	Techeetah-Renault
Second	(Sweden) Felix Rosenqvist	Mahindra
Third	(Argentina) José María López	Virgin-Citroën

=== Practice and qualifying ===
As was the case for 29 July, two practice sessions—both on Sunday morning—were held before the late afternoon race. The first session ran for 45 minutes and the second 30 minutes. Both practice sessions took place in dry and clear weather. In the third practice session, di Grassi used the maximum amount of power available to him to record the fastest time of 1 minute and 21.442 seconds late on, almost four-tenths of a second faster than Prost in second. Buemi, Félix da Costa, Rosenqvist, López, Bird, Evans, d'Ambrosio and Vergne followed in the top ten. Duval was investigated for colliding with Piquet's car heading into the first corner when he overtook him on the inside. Rosenqvist was quickest in the fourth practice session with a 1-minute and 21.183 seconds lap; Buemi, López, Bird, Duval, Abt, Turvey, Vergne, di Grassi and Prost completed the top ten. Abt made minor contact with Prost in the first turn, damaging the latter's front wing, and puncturing Abt's right-rear tyre. The first yellow flag was prompted when Duval locked his tyres and slid onto the chicane's run-off area, and a second was necessitated after Piquet locked his tyres, spun into the barrier at turn eleven and damaged his front wing. Evans narrowly avoided contact with the turn two barrier after locking his tyres driving towards it. After fourth practice ended, Rosenqvist's qualifying car suffered a battery problem, forcing him to use his second vehicle while his team rebuilt his first car's powertrain by disassembling its rear.

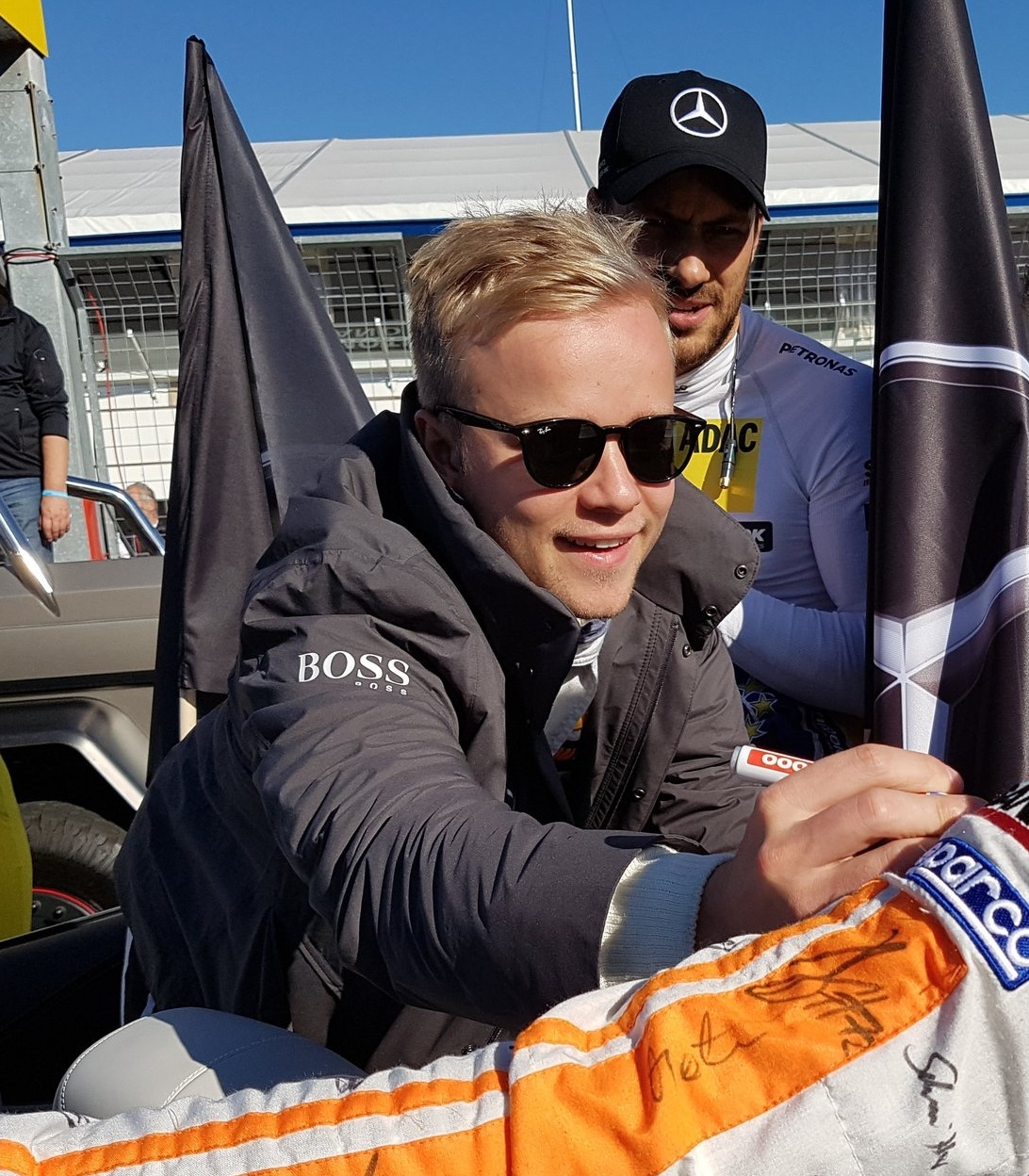
Felix Rosenqvist (pictured in 2016) had his third pole position of the season.

Qualifying took place from early Sunday afternoon with four groups of five cars with the fastest five overall participants progressing into super pole. It was held in dry and warm weather. In the first group of five cars, López set a benchmark lap time with Duval close behind in second. On his maximum power lap, Buemi locked his tyres going into the first turn, but despite going quicker in the second sector, was provisional third. Engel and Carroll were the first group's slowest drivers. Rosenqvist paced the second group, followed by Vergne. Dillmann and d'Ambrosio were third and fourth and Evans was the slowest competitor in the second group after heavily locking his tyres entering the first corner and had to regain control of his car to continue driving. Piquet set the third group's quickest time. Sarrazin in second locked his brakes driving into turn one on his maximum power lap. Félix da Costa ran deep heading into the first turn and excessive oversteer throughout his lap left him in third. Frijns, suffering similar problems to his teammate, followed in fourth, and Turvey was the third group's slowest competitor.

Bird set the fastest overall lap in the fourth group at 1 minute, 22.012 seconds, four-tenths of a second faster than the second-placed Heidfeld. Di Grassi, Abt and Prost were the fourth group's three slowest participants. At the end of group qualifying, the lap times set by Bird, Rosenqvist, Vergne, Heidfeld and di Grassi advanced them to super pole. Rosenqvist clinched his third pole position of the season with a 1-minute, 22.344 seconds lap. He was joined on the grid's front row by Bird who appeared to go fastest by improving in the first sector but drifted in turn seven and voiced his disappointment over the radio. Vergne gained most of his time in the first sector and was clean for the rest of his lap for third. Despite complaining about his state of his brakes, Heidfeld took fourth. Di Grassi locked his rear brakes entering the first turn and oversteered through the corner. He did not regain any time and started fifth. After qualifying, Prost was demoted twenty places on the grid because he changed his battery and inverter following a car bay fire after the first race. However, Prost did not take the full penalty, and began from the pit lane with ten seconds added to his race time. After the penalty was applied, the rest of the field lined up as Abt, Dillmann, Piquet, Sarrazin, d'Ambrosio, López, Duval, Buemi, Félix da Costa, Frijns, Turvey, Evans, Engel, Carroll and Prost.

=== Race ===
The weather at the start were dry and warm with an air temperature ranging from 27.05 to 27.75 °C (80.69 to 81.95 °F) and a track temperature between 30.55 and 31.10 °C (86.99 and 87.98 °F). When the second race started at 16:00 local time, Rosenqvist steered left to keep the lead ahead of the battling Bird and Vergne going into the first corner. Di Grassi pressured Heidfeld but a sudden loss in speed fell him behind Dillmann. Sarrazin made contact with Abt and Piquet in the first turn, and spun, creating a small traffic jam in which all cars got through. As the field concertinaed through the first corner, Robin Frijns hit the right-rear corner of Buemi's car, causing Buemi's right rear wheel guard to detach and flail in the wind. Although the loose bodywork piece came off, Buemi was shown a black flag with an orange disc, requiring him to enter the pit lane to mend car damage. López moved from eleventh to seventh by the end of the first lap, while Sarrazin's incident dropped him ten places over the same distance. At the end of the first lap, Rosenqvist led Vergne, Bird, Heidfeld, Dillmann, di Grassi, López, Abt, d'Ambrosio and Duval.

Buemi gained two positions before entering the pit lane, and voiced his anger over the radio. Because the loose bodywork part had fallen off, Buemi was stationary in his pit stall for only a few seconds and rejoined in 19th, ahead of teammate Prost. D'Ambrosio passed Abt for eighth but the latter regained the position after driving through the next few turns. Heidfeld overtook Bird to take over the third position and Dillmann began to battle the latter. At the front, Rosenqvist and Vergne pulled clear from Bird and Heidfeld. With both e.Dams drivers running at the rear of the pack, the team faced a predicament of pushing to secure the Teams' Championship or for Buemi to retake the Drivers' Championship. After ten laps, Vergne duelled Rosenqvist for the lead as the latter had more electrical energy to use than the latter ahead of him but could not find any space to move in front. Heidfeld and Bird backed themselves into Dillmann's path, prompting him to apply his brakes early and allowing López to challenge for third position. Heidfeld then slowed, allowing the Virgin duo of Bird and López to overtake him.

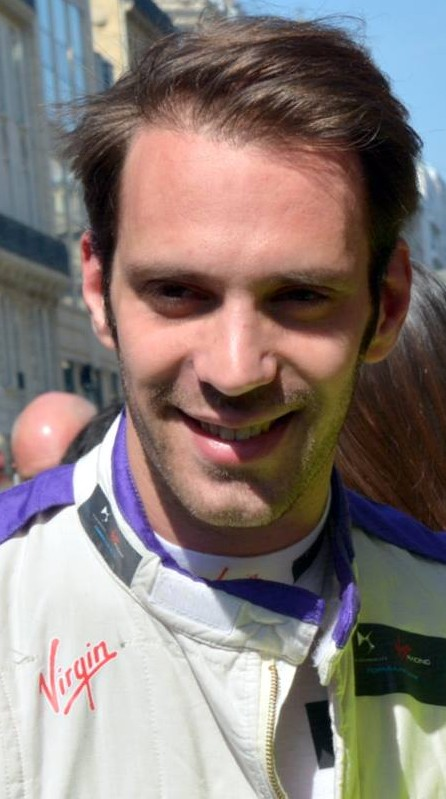
Jean-Éric Vergne (pictured in 2016) took his first motor racing victory since competing in the 2011 Formula Renault 3.5 Series.

The mandatory change for drivers to switch into their second cars began on lap 18 when Engel and Piquet entered the pit lane. Rosenqvist followed on the next lap with Vergne, López and the Audi Sport ABT duo of di Grassi and Abt opting to remain on track for another lap to allow them to run without aerodynamic turbulence affecting their cars. Di Grassi's strategy of staying out for one extra lap did not work as his pit stop lasted two seconds slower than the agreed minimum pit stop time, and emerged in tenth place, behind his teammate Abt. Piquet duelled with di Grassi and the latter retained tenth position. Abt then ceded ninth position to his teammate di Grassi. Prost led the field for one lap before making his pit stop. After the pit stops, Rosenqvist retook the lead and was five seconds ahead of Vergne. The time gaps in the field had extended significantly and most drivers attempted to again close up to their rivals. Both Audi Sport ABT drivers had been unable to make huge progress through the field, improving e.Dams-Renault's chances of retaining the Teams' Championship. However di Grassi and teammate Abt overtook d'Ambrosio and drew closer to the battling Venturi cars of Engel and Dillmann. Di Grassi passed Dillmann on lap 27 and Buemi used his FanBoost to take 15th from Frijns.

Di Grassi forced Engel into a driving error and passed him for sixth. Vergne had drawn close to race leader Rosenqvist and took advantage of him lifting and coasting to overtake him without trouble for first heading towards turn three on the 29th lap. Vergne's higher top speed allowed him to pull away quickly from Rosenqvist. Prost entered the pit lane with a mechanical problem. However, he recorded the race's fastest lap beforehand, completing a circuit in 1 minute, 23.444 seconds on the previous lap for one championship point. Bird lost third place to his teammate López after a closely contested battle that saw both drivers collide. Both Audi Sport ABT drivers continued to draw closer to Heidfeld. With two laps remaining, Frijns tried to pass Duval but they made contact and Duval ended his race in a barrier. Yellow flags were waved in the area but the safety car was not deployed. López caught Rosenqvist in the race's final laps but could not pass him.

Vergne held the lead for the remainder of the race to take his first Formula E victory after eight podium finishes in the preceding three seasons. It was Vergne's first motor racing victory since the 2011 Formula Renault 3.5 Series round at Circuit Paul Ricard. Rosenqvist took second, eight-tenths of a second behind with López third. Off the podium, Bird took fourth and Heidfeld fifth. Abt moved into sixth on the final lap, and teammate di Grassi finished seventh to secure his first Drivers' Championship. Sarrazin came back through the field to take eighth. D'Ambrosio and Dillmann rounded out the top ten. Buemi, Evans, Frijns, Carroll and Félix da Costa. Piquet, Turvey, Engel and Duval were the final finishers. Di Grassi became the third champion in the history of Formula E and the second Brazilian after Piquet in the 2014–15 season. There were four lead changes in the race; three drivers reached the front of the field. Rosenqvist's total of 25 laps led was the most of any competitor. Vergne led twice for a total of 11 laps.

=== Post-race ===
The top three drivers appeared on the podium to collect their trophies and spoke to the media in a later press conference. Vergne was happy with his maiden victory, calling it "extremely satisfying" as he endured a difficult season and it would improve his team's confidence in the future, "There were mistakes as a team but nevertheless, to get second places, double podiums and then a win today is an amazing feeling." He stated the win would put Techeetah's personnel in a positive state of mind and would return for the following the season as a stronger force in the series. Rosenqvist revealed that Bird was his main rival over the race weekend and his focus was to secure third place in the Drivers' Championship. Nevertheless, he was delighted to finish third in his rookie season because he believed it showed the effort of his team Mahindra. Third-place finisher López spoke of his pleasure finishing there following his first race retirement because he immediately noticed changes to his car and had been frustrated qualifying did not give him the opportunity to demonstrate it.

Newly crowned champion di Grassi said of his title success, "This journey, this day started three years ago when we started season one, and then we got a lot of good results. I arrived in London fighting for the championship, even though I got disqualified from winning a race. Season two, the same situation, even got disqualified from winning a race. Finally I came here as an underdog, 10 points behind and had the nerves to keep calm, I did the job yesterday and today managed to win it also. I'm so happy for my team, so happy for the ABT Schaeffler Audi Sport guys, they really deserve it." He later claimed to have not given up hope in winning the championship despite a competitive field and retiring from the Paris ePrix, but also admitted focusing on Formula E after Audi's withdrawal from the World Endurance Championship at the end of 2016 helped him. While Buemi admitted to being disappointed over losing the championship, he congratulated di Grassi on his title win, and stated him missing the New York City races was not an excuse in his defeat. Regarding his pit stop early in the race, Buemi chose not to judge if the stewards were correct and admitted to not knowing about the regulation requiring him to enter the pit lane if his car was damaged.

The result secured di Grassi the Drivers' Championship with 181 points. Buemi, in second place, was 24 points behind with Rosenqvist the best of the rookie drivers in third on 127 points. Bird took fourth, and Vergne's victory secured him fifth place. e.Dams-Renault became the Teams' Champions for the third consecutive year on 268 points; Audi Sport ABT finished 20 points behind in second, and Mahindra were a further 33 points adrift in third position. Virgin consolidated fourth on 190 points and Techeetah was fifth with 156 points. 45,000 people attended the two-day event. Despite insisting the race could not be held elsewhere in the city, Corderre later conceded the 2018 edition was at risk of being relocated due to nearby construction. Future ePrix in Montreal were cancelled by new mayor Valérie Plante in December, citing rising costs to the tax payer.

=== Standings after the race ===
- **Bold text** indicates the Champions.

Drivers' Championship standings

+/–	Pos	Driver	Points
	1	(Brazil) **Lucas di Grassi**	181
	2	(Switzerland) Sébastien Buemi	157 (−24)
1	3	(Sweden) Felix Rosenqvist	127 (−54)
1	4	(United Kingdom) Sam Bird	122 (−58)
	5	(France) Jean-Éric Vergne	117 (−64)

Teams' Championship standings

+/–	Pos	Constructor	Points
	1	(France) **e.Dams-Renault**	268
	2	(Germany) Audi Sport ABT	248 (−20)
	3	(India) Mahindra	215 (−53)
	4	(United Kingdom) Virgin-Citroën	190 (−78)
	5	(China) Techeetah-Renault	156 (−112)

- Notes: Only the top five positions are included for both sets of standings.

== Classification ==
=== Qualifying one ===
Final first qualifying classification
Pos.	No.	Driver	Team	GS	SP	Grid
1	11	(Brazil) Lucas di Grassi	Audi Sport ABT	1:23.026	1:22.869	1
2	9	(Switzerland) Sébastien Buemi	e.Dams-Renault	1:23.056	1:23.065	12^{1}
3	33	(France) Stéphane Sarrazin	Techeetah-Renault	1:23.138	1:23.179	2
4	8	(France) Nico Prost	e.Dams-Renault	1:23.232	1:23.330	4^{2}
5	19	(Sweden) Felix Rosenqvist	Mahindra	1:23.239	1:24.351	3
6	25	(France) Jean-Éric Vergne	Techeetah-Renault	1:23.398	—N/a	5
7	20	(New Zealand) Mitch Evans	Jaguar	1:23.532	—N/a	6
8	47	(United Kingdom) Adam Carroll	Jaguar	1:23.869	—N/a	7
9	88	(United Kingdom) Oliver Turvey	NextEV NIO	1:23.923	—N/a	8
10	4	(France) Tom Dillmann	Venturi	1:23.931	—N/a	9
11	6	(France) Loïc Duval	Dragon-Penske	1:23.999	—N/a	10
12	66	(Germany) Daniel Abt	Audi Sport ABT	1:24.302	—N/a	11
13	27	(Netherlands) Robin Frijns	Andretti-BMW	1:24.622	—N/a	13
14	23	(Germany) Nick Heidfeld	Mahindra	1:24.769	—N/a	14
15	28	(Portugal) António Félix da Costa	Andretti-BMW	1:24.805	—N/a	15
16	37	(Argentina) José María López	Virgin-Citroën	1:25.297	—N/a	16
17	5	(Germany) Maro Engel	Venturi	1:25.369	—N/a	17
18	2	(United Kingdom) Sam Bird	Virgin-Citroën	1:25.770	—N/a	18
19	3	(Brazil) Nelson Piquet Jr.	NextEV NIO	1:26.165	—N/a	19
20	7	(Belgium) Jérôme d'Ambrosio	Dragon-Penske	1:36.580	—N/a	20

Notes:

- **^1** — Sébastien Buemi was demoted ten places because of a battery change.
- **^2** — Nico Prost was demoted to the rear of the super pole field for an underweight car in Super Pole.

=== Race one ===
Drivers who scored championship points are denoted in bold.

Final first race classification
Pos.	No.	Driver	Team	Laps	Time/Retired	Grid	Points
1	**11**	**(Brazil) Lucas di Grassi**	**Audi Sport ABT**	**35**	**56:55.592**	**1**	25+3^{3}
2	**25**	**(France) Jean-Éric Vergne**	**Techeetah-Renault**	**35**	**+0.350**	**5**	18
3	**33**	**(France) Stéphane Sarrazin**	**Techeetah-Renault**	**35**	**+7.869**	**2**	15
4	**66**	**(Germany) Daniel Abt**	**Audi Sport ABT**	**35**	**+8.592**	**11**	12
5	**2**	**(United Kingdom) Sam Bird**	**Virgin-Citroën**	**35**	**+8.913**	**18**	10
6	**8**	**(France) Nico Prost**	**e.Dams-Renault**	**35**	**+10.058**	**4**	8
7	**20**	**(New Zealand) Mitch Evans**	**Jaguar**	**35**	**+10.457**	**6**	6
8	**27**	**(Netherlands) Robin Frijns**	**Andretti-BMW**	**35**	**+15.836**	**13**	4
9	**19**	**(Sweden) Felix Rosenqvist**	**Mahindra**	**35**	**+16.764**	**3**	2
10	**4**	**(France) Tom Dillmann**	**Venturi**	**35**	**+19.320**	**9**	1
11	7	(Belgium) Jérôme d'Ambrosio	Dragon-Penske	35	+20.229	20	
12	5	(Germany) Maro Engel	Venturi	35	+22.314	17	
13	3	(Brazil) Nelson Piquet Jr.	NextEV NIO	35	+23.145	19	
14	28	(Portugal) António Félix da Costa	Andretti-BMW	35	+34.786	15	
15	88	(United Kingdom) Oliver Turvey	NextEV NIO	35	+46.996	8	
16	47	(United Kingdom) Adam Carroll	Jaguar	35	+49.612	7	
Ret	**6**	**(France) Loïc Duval**	**Dragon-Penske**	**26**	**Electrical**	**10**	1^{4}
Ret	37	(Argentina) José María López	Virgin-Citroën	23	Accident	16	
Ret	23	(Germany) Nick Heidfeld	Mahindra	13	Suspension	14	
DSQ	9	(Switzerland) Sébastien Buemi	e.Dams-Renault	35	Underweight^{5}	12	

Notes:

- **^3** — Three points for pole position.
- **^4** — One point for fastest lap.
- **^5** — Sébastien Buemi was disqualified for an underweight second car.

=== Qualifying two ===
Final second qualifying classification
Pos.	No.	Driver	Team	GS	SP	Grid
1	19	(Sweden) Felix Rosenqvist	Mahindra	1:22.051	1:22.344	1
2	2	(United Kingdom) Sam Bird	Virgin-Citroën	1:22.012	1:22.559	2
3	25	(France) Jean-Éric Vergne	Techeetah-Renault	1:22.378	1:22.769	3
4	23	(Germany) Nick Heidfeld	Mahindra	1:22.423	1:23.041	4
5	11	(Brazil) Lucas di Grassi	Audi Sport ABT	1:22.459	1:23.557	5
6	66	(Germany) Daniel Abt	Audi Sport ABT	1:22.694	—N/a	6
7	7	(France) Nico Prost	e.Dams-Renault	1:22.721	—N/a	20^{6}
8	4	(France) Tom Dillmann	Venturi	1:22.822	—N/a	7
9	3	(Brazil) Nelson Piquet Jr.	NextEV NIO	1:22.972	—N/a	8
10	33	(France) Stéphane Sarrazin	Techeetah-Renault	1:23.057	—N/a	9
11	7	(Belgium) Jérôme d'Ambrosio	Dragon-Penske	1:23.058	—N/a	10
12	37	(Argentina) José María López	Virgin-Citroën	1:23.313	—N/a	11
13	6	(France) Loïc Duval	Dragon-Penske	1:23.337	—N/a	12
14	9	(Switzerland) Sébastien Buemi	e.Dams-Renault	1:23.372	—N/a	13
15	28	(Portugal) António Félix da Costa	Andretti-BMW	1:23.635	—N/a	14
16	27	(Netherlands) Robin Frijns	Andretti-BMW	1:23.655	—N/a	15
17	88	(United Kingdom) Oliver Turvey	NextEV NIO	1:23.709	—N/a	16
18	20	(New Zealand) Mitch Evans	Jaguar	1:23.755	—N/a	17
19	5	(Germany) Maro Engel	Venturi	1:23.811	—N/a	18
20	47	(United Kingdom) Adam Carroll	Jaguar	1:24.024	—N/a	19

Notes:

- **^6** — Nico Prost was handed a twenty-place grid penalty for changing his inverter and battery.

=== Race two ===
Drivers who scored championship points are denoted in bold.

Final second race classification
Pos.	No.	Driver	Team	Laps	Time/Retired	Grid	Points
1	**25**	**(France) Jean-Éric Vergne**	**Techeetah-Renault**	**37**	**54:12.606**	**3**	25
2	**19**	**(Sweden) Felix Rosenqvist**	**Mahindra**	**37**	**+0.896**	**1**	18+3^{7}
3	**37**	**(Argentina) José María López**	**Virgin-Citroën**	**37**	**+4.468**	**11**	15
4	**2**	**(United Kingdom) Sam Bird**	**Virgin-Citroën**	**37**	**+7.114**	**2**	12
5	**23**	**(Germany) Nick Heidfeld**	**Mahindra**	**37**	**+21.933**	**4**	10
6	**66**	**(Germany) Daniel Abt**	**Audi Sport ABT**	**37**	**+24.444**	**6**	8
7	**11**	**(Brazil) Lucas di Grassi**	**Audi Sport ABT**	**37**	**+24.855**	**5**	6
8	**33**	**(France) Stéphane Sarrazin**	**Techeetah-Renault**	**37**	**+26.038**	**9**	4
9	**7**	**(Belgium) Jérôme d'Ambrosio**	**Dragon-Penske**	**37**	**+28.282**	**10**	2
10	**4**	**(France) Tom Dillmann**	**Venturi**	**37**	**+28.591**	**7**	1
11	9	(Switzerland) Sébastien Buemi	e.Dams-Renault	37	+35.170	13	
12	20	(New Zealand) Mitch Evans	Jaguar	37	+36.548	17	
13	27	(Netherlands) Robin Frijns	Andretti-BMW	37	+36.826	15	
14	47	(United Kingdom) Adam Carroll	Jaguar	37	+36.972	19	
15	28	(Portugal) António Félix da Costa	Andretti-BMW	37	+39.720	14	
16	3	(Brazil) Nelson Piquet Jr.	NextEV NIO	37	+46.751	8	
17	88	(United Kingdom) Oliver Turvey	NextEV NIO	37	+49.116	16	
18	5	(Germany) Maro Engel	Venturi	37	+1:33.530	18	
19	6	(France) Loïc Duval	Dragon-Penske	34	Accident	12	
Ret	**8**	**(France) Nico Prost**	**e.Dams-Renault**	**32**	**Mechanical**	**20**	1^{8} ^{9}

Notes:

- **^7** — Three points for pole position.
- **^8** — One point for fastest lap.
- **^9** — Nico Prost had ten seconds added to his race time.

Previous race: 2017 New York City ePrix	FIA Formula E Championship; 2016–17 season	Next race: 2017 Hong Kong ePrix
Previous race: N/A	Montreal ePrix	Next race: N/A
