= Jérôme d'Ambrosio =

Belgian racing driver and motorsport executive (born 1985)

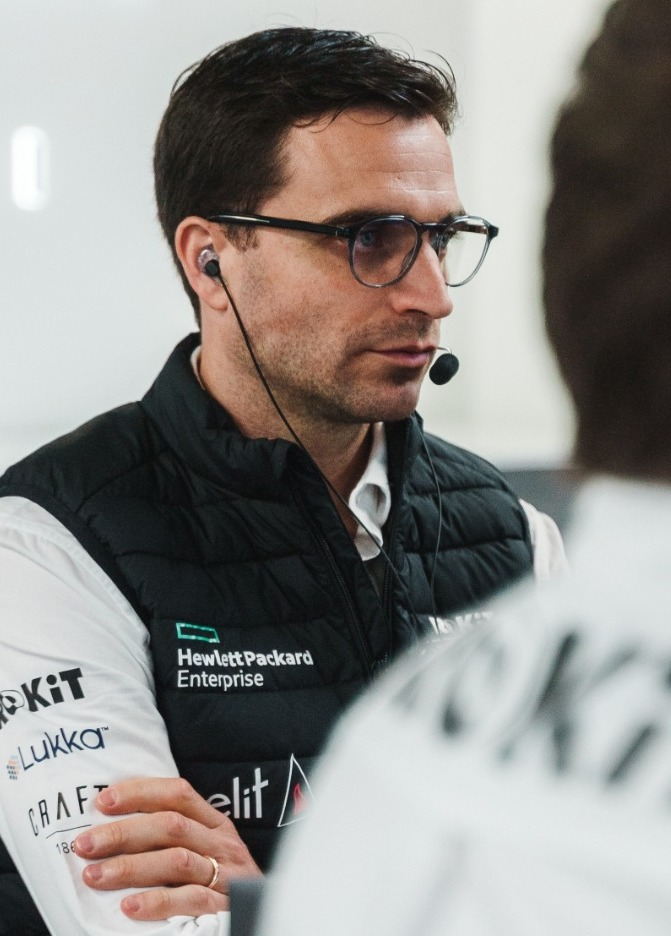
- D'Ambrosio at the 2022 Berlin ePrix
- Born: 27 December 1985 (age 40); Etterbeek, Brussels, Belgium
- Education: St. John's International School
- Occupations: Motorsport executive; racing driver
- Employers: Formula E; Venturi (2020–2022); Formula One; Mercedes (2023–2024); Ferrari (2024–present)
- Title: Deputy Team Principal; Head of the Ferrari Driver Academy
- Spouses: Natalie Sifferman (m. 2013; div. 2015) Eleonore von Habsburg (m. 2020)
- Children: 3
- Family: House of Habsburg-Lorraine (jure uxoris)

Formula One World Championship career
- Nationality: (Belgium) Belgian
- Active years: 2011–2012
- Team(s): Virgin, Lotus
- Entries: 20
- Championships: 0
- Wins: 0
- Podiums: 0
- Career points: 0
- Pole positions: 0
- Fastest laps: 0
- First entry: 2011 Australian Grand Prix
- Last entry: 2012 Italian Grand Prix

Formula E career
- Years active: 2014–2020
- Teams: Dragon, Mahindra
- Car number: 7 (2014–2018); 64 (2018–2020)
- Starts: 68
- Championships: 0
- Wins: 3
- Podiums: 9
- Poles: 2
- Fastest laps: 3
- Best finish: 4th in 2014–15

Previous series
- 2014 2008–2010 2008–2009 2007 2006 2006 2005 2004–2005 2004 2003 2003: Blancpain Endurance Series; GP2 Series; GP2 Asia Series; International Formula Master; Formula Renault 3.5; Euroseries 3000; Italian Formula Renault; Formula Renault Eurocup; French Formula Renault; Formula König; Belgian Formula Renault

Championship titles
- 2007 2003: International Formula Master; Belgian Formula Renault

Jérôme d'Ambrosio (pronounced [ʒeʁom dambrɔzjo]; born 27 December 1985) is a Belgian motorsport executive and former racing driver who competed in Formula One from 2011 to 2012. Since 2024, d'Ambrosio has served as deputy team principal of Ferrari in Formula One, as well as the head of the Ferrari Driver Academy.

Born and raised in Brussels, d'Ambrosio began competitive kart racing aged 13, winning the senior World Cup three years later. Graduating to junior formulae in 2003, d'Ambrosio won his first title in Belgian Formula Renault that year. After four seasons in Formula Renault, he progressed to International Formula Master, winning the championship in its inaugural 2007 season. D'Ambrosio moved up to the GP2 Series in 2008 with DAMS, achieving several podiums across three seasons, amongst finishing runner-up to Kamui Kobayashi in the Asia Series.

D'Ambrosio has previously driven for Marussia Virgin Racing, as well as Lotus F1, in the 2011 and 2012 Formula One World Championships. From 2014 to 2020, he competed in Formula E driving for Dragon Racing and Mahindra Racing. D'Ambrosio achieved three victories in the series, winning the 2015 Berlin ePrix, 2016 Mexico City ePrix, and 2019 Marrakesh ePrix. He was formerly the Team Principal of Venturi Racing in Formula E.

== Early life and career ==
Jérôme d'Ambrosio was born on 27 December 1985 in Etterbeek, Brussels, Belgium. His father is Henri d'Ambrosio, and his mother is Giselle d'Ambrosio.

=== 1999–2002: Karting ===
D'Ambrosio began his career in karting in 1999. By 2002, he was a three-time Belgian champion after winning the Mini class in 1999, Junior class in 2000 and Formula A in 2002. Alongside national success, he won the Junior Monaco Kart Cup in 2000 and was the winner of the World Cup Formula A championship in 2002.

=== 2003–2007: Formula Renault, Euroseries 3000, and Formula Master ===
D'Ambrosio graduated to single-seater competition in 2003 and won the Belgian Formula Renault championship with five wins, driving for Thierry Boutsen Racing. He also contested the German-based Formula König series where he finished fourth in the standings.

For 2004, d'Ambrosio earned a place on the Renault F1 Driver Development Programme and moved into the French Formula Renault 2.0 series where he finished fourth in the Drivers' Championship as the highest-placed rookie. He also contested seven races in Formula Renault 2.0 Eurocup. In 2005, he switched to Italian Formula Renault and finished third in the championship's Winter Series and fourth overall in the regular season, recording three wins and six podiums across both. He also started six races in the Eurocup, taking two podiums.

D'Ambrosio graduated to the highest category of Formula Renault in 2006, racing in the 3.5 Series for Tech 1 Racing but left the championship after seven races. After leaving the Formula Renault 3.5 Series, d'Ambrosio switched to Euroseries 3000 with Euronova Racing and finished fifth in the final standings, despite missing the first half of the season. He also participated in one round of the FIA GT Championship, driving a Gillet Vertigo in the GT2 class.

In 2007, d'Ambrosio participated in the inaugural season of the International Formula Master series. Racing for Cram Competition, he secured five wins, eleven podiums and seven fastest laps in sixteen races to win the championship.

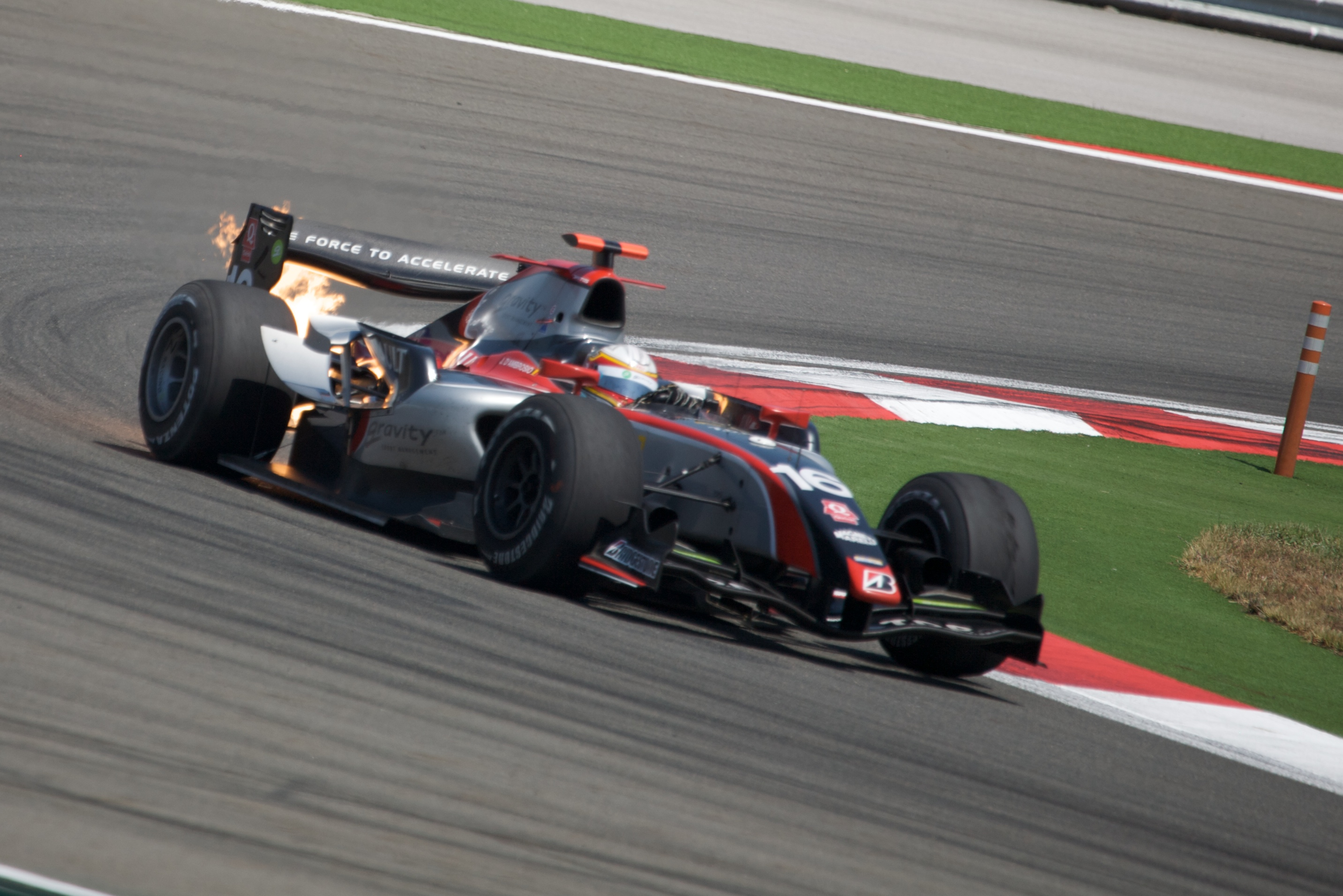
D'Ambrosio driving for DAMS at the Turkish round of the 2009 GP2 Series season.

=== 2008–2010: GP2 Series ===
D'Ambrosio joined Formula One feeder championship, the GP2 Series, in 2008 and also raced in the newly created GP2 Asia Series, both for the DAMS team. He finished 11th in both championships, with two podiums in each series. He extended his relationship with DAMS in 2009 and finished as the vice-champion in the 2008–09 GP2 Asia Series with four podiums. D'Ambrosio started the 2009 GP2 Series well and recorded three podiums in the first four races and finished ninth in the final standings.

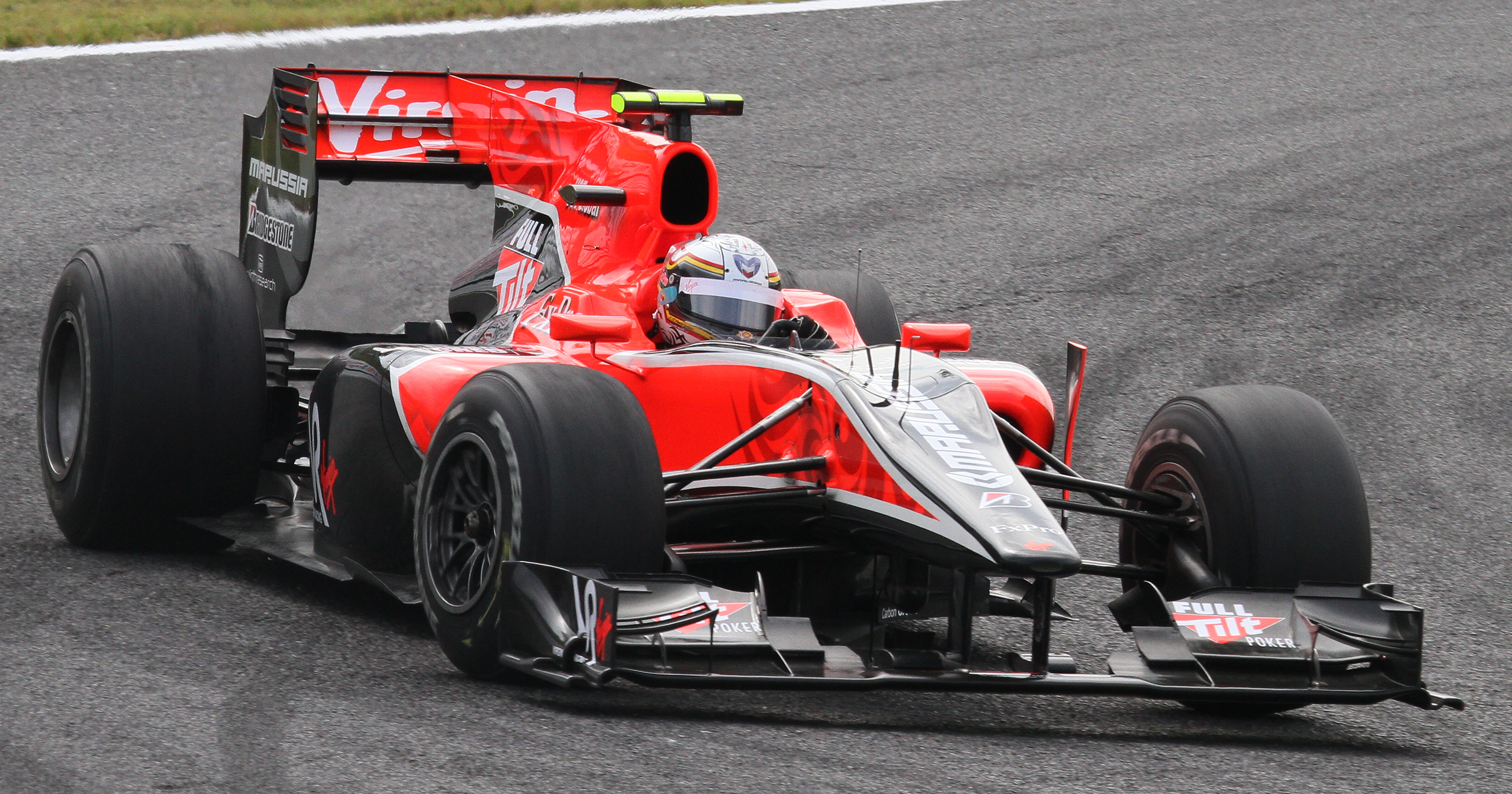
D'Ambrosio driving for Virgin Racing as the team's third driver at the 2010 Japanese Grand Prix.

In 2010, d'Ambrosio experienced a breakout season with DAMS and secured his first victory in the championship at Monaco. He later took his first series pole position at his home event at the Circuit de Spa-Francorchamps but retired from the race when leading. He took one further podium at Monza and finished 12th in the standings.

=== 2010–2013: Formula One ===
In January 2010, d'Ambrosio was named as the Reserve Driver of the Renault F1 Team after rejoining the outfit's young driver programme. Later in the year on 16 September, it was announced that d'Ambrosio would make his Formula One race weekend debut, making four practice appearances with Virgin Racing at the Singapore, Japanese, Korean and Brazilian Grands Prix. He placed 21st in his first FP1 appearance at the Marina Bay Street Circuit, finishing two-tenths behind experienced team-mate Timo Glock.

==== Virgin (2011) ====
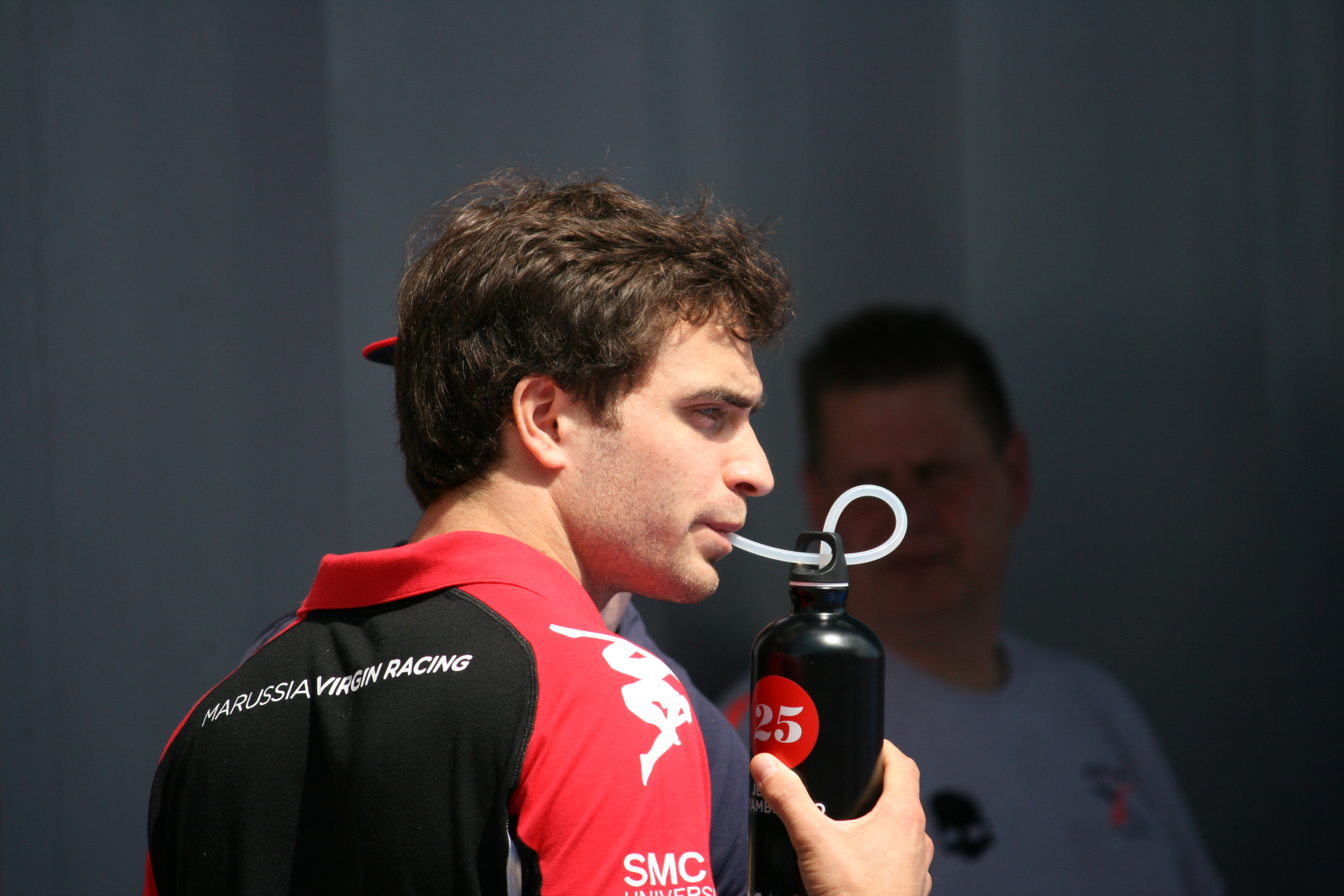
D'Ambrosio at the 2011 Spanish Grand Prix.

On 21 December 2010, it was officially announced that d'Ambrosio would race for Virgin Racing in the 2011 Formula One World Championship, replacing Lucas di Grassi and partnering Glock. In the Virgin garage, d'Ambrosio was affectionately known as "Custard", with the word pasted on his cockpit when he began testing for the 2011 season at Valencia. Ambrosia is a well-known UK brand of custard and rice pudding.

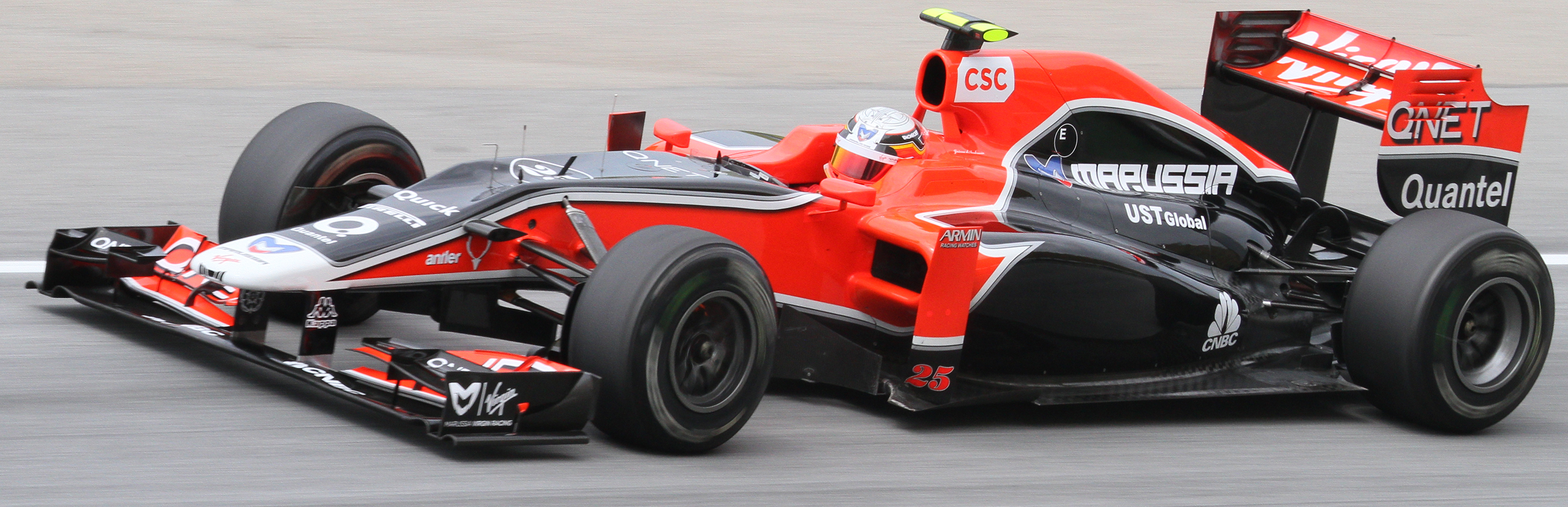
D'Ambrosio at the 2011 Malaysian Grand Prix

Driving the largely uncompetitive Virgin MVR-02, d'Ambrosio finished sixteen of the season's nineteen races and retired from the Malaysian, Italian and Abu Dhabi Grands Prix due to poor reliability with problems with his electronics, gearbox and brakes. D'Ambrosio became the first Belgian driver to compete at the Belgian Grand Prix since Thierry Boutsen in 1993 and finished 17th, beating team-mate Glock. He finished the season 24th in the Drivers' Championship with a best of two 14th-place finishes in Australia and Canada. Despite beating Glock, d'Ambrosio was replaced by Charles Pic for the 2012 season.

==== Lotus (2012–2013) ====
On 24 January 2012, d'Ambrosio was named as the official reserve driver for Lotus F1 for the 2012 season, supporting full-time drivers Kimi Räikkönen and Romain Grosjean. Throughout the season, he did co-commentary work for Sky Sports F1 for Formula One practice sessions, GP2 and GP3 races, and also commentated for the Belgian French-speaking channel, RTBF.

D'Ambrosio replaced Grosjean at the 2012 Italian Grand Prix to make his debut for Lotus after the Frenchman received a one-race ban for causing a multi-car collision at the previous round in Belgium. He qualified 16th for the race and started in 15th due to a ten-place grid penalty for Pastor Maldonado. D'Ambrosio finished in 13th and on the lead lap, 76 seconds behind winner Lewis Hamilton. D'Ambrosio continued as Lotus F1's reserve driver for 2013 until the end of the season.

=== Blancpain Endurance Series ===
In 2014, d'Ambrosio switched from single-seaters to GT racing and joined Bentley to race a Continental GT3 in the Blancpain Endurance Series. Alongside team-mates Duncan Tappy and Antoine Leclerc, d'Ambrosio secured a best result of sixth at the first race of the season at Monza.

=== 2014–2020: Formula E ===
==== Dragon Racing ====
D'Ambrosio joined Dragon Racing to contest the inaugural season of the FIA Formula E Championship, partnering Oriol Servià and Loïc Duval.

===== 2014–15 =====
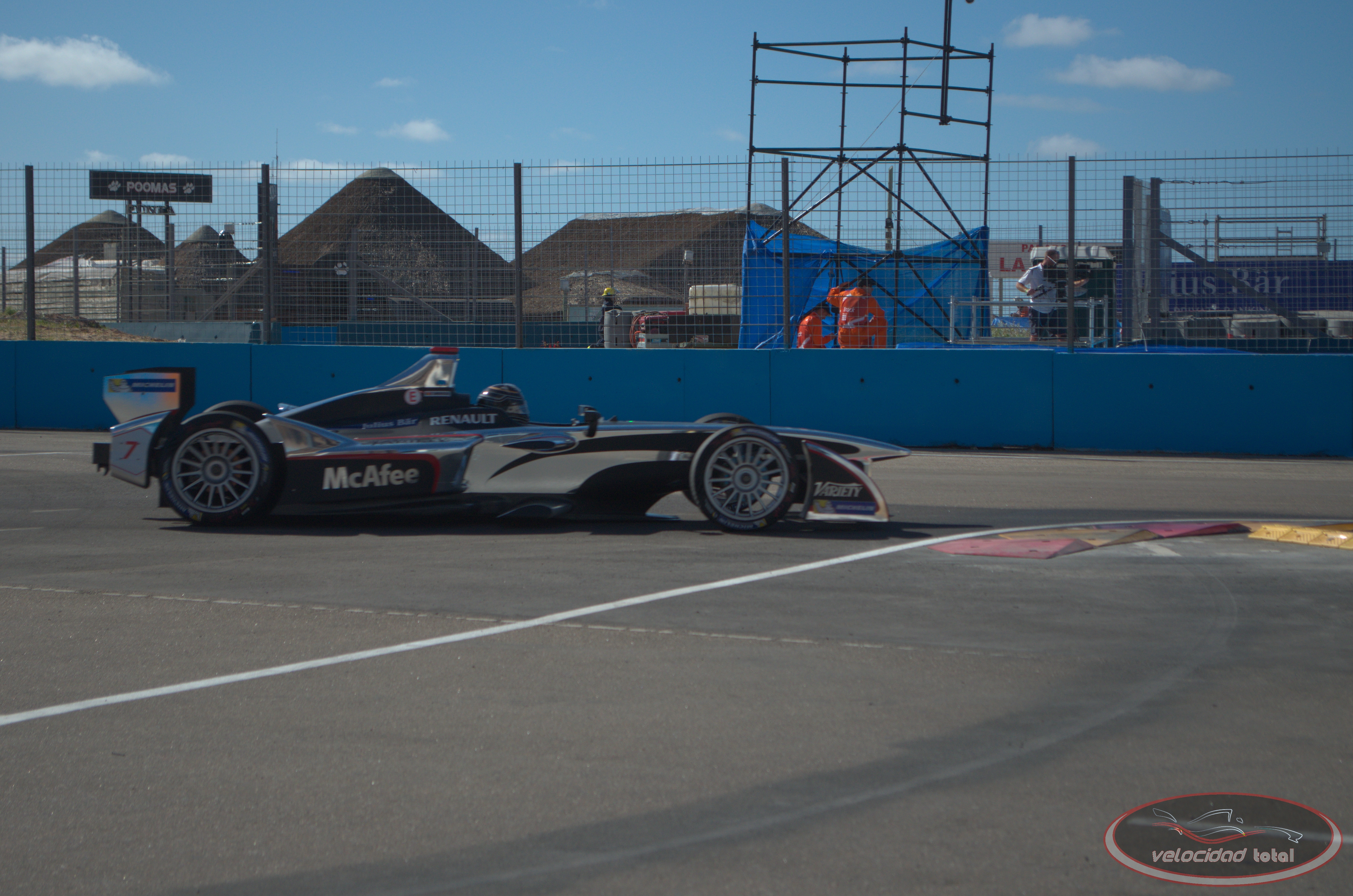
D'Ambrosio at the 2014 Punta del Este ePrix

D'Ambrosio scored points on debut by finishing sixth at the 2014 Beijing ePrix and secured his first victory in the series at the 2015 Berlin ePrix, winning the race after initial victor, Lucas di Grassi, was disqualified after violating technical regulations. D'Ambrosio scored back-to-back podiums at the double-header 2015 London ePrix to finish fourth in the Drivers' Championship with 113 points. During the year, d'Ambrosio was the only driver on the grid to finish every race and completed every racing lap in the 2014/15 season, missing out on the top-ten only twice. Dragon Racing finished second in the Teams' Championship.

===== 2015–16 =====
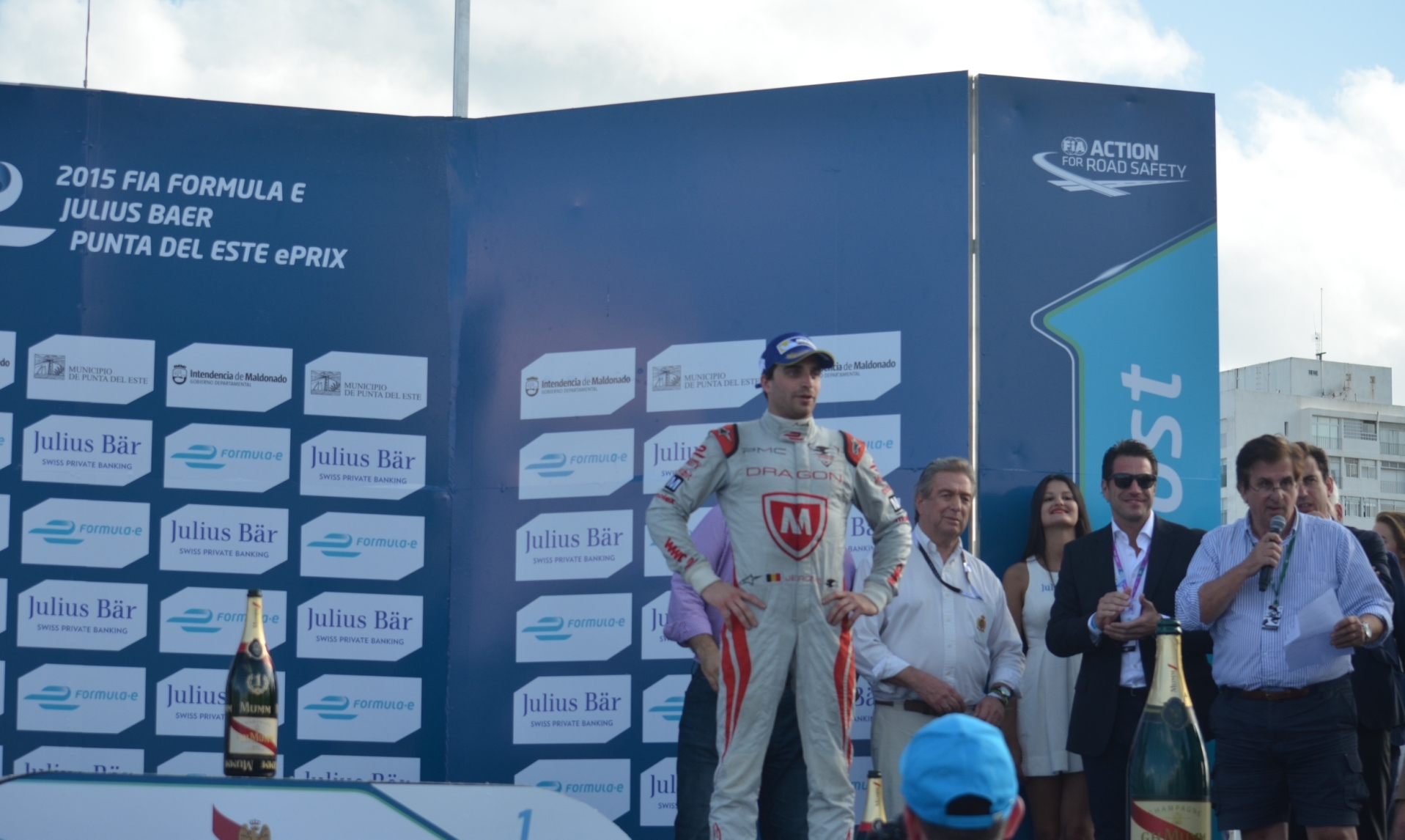
D'Ambrosio finished third at the 2015 Punta del Este ePrix

D'Ambrosio remained with Dragon Racing for the 2015–16 Formula E Championship and was again partnered by Duval. The team used powertrains developed by Venturi Racing. He finished fifth in the first race of the season in Beijing and scored his first pole position in the series at the 2015 Punta del Este ePrix and went on to finish third. D'Ambrosio recorded his second career victory at the 2016 Mexico City ePrix after original winner, Lucas di Grassi, was disqualified due to a technical infringement. By finishing third at the season finale in London, d'Ambrosio finished fifth in the Drivers' Championship with 83 points.

===== 2016–17 =====
D'Ambrosio continued to race for Dragon Racing in the 2016–17 Formula E Championship, with the team manufacturing its own powertrains for the first time after entering a four-year technical partnership with American technology start-up, Faraday Future. He secured his best finish of the year at the season-opening race in Hong Kong, in which he finished seventh. D'Ambrosio scored further points in Buenos Aires, New York, and Montreal and finished 18th in the Drivers' Championship with 13 points.

===== 2017–18 =====
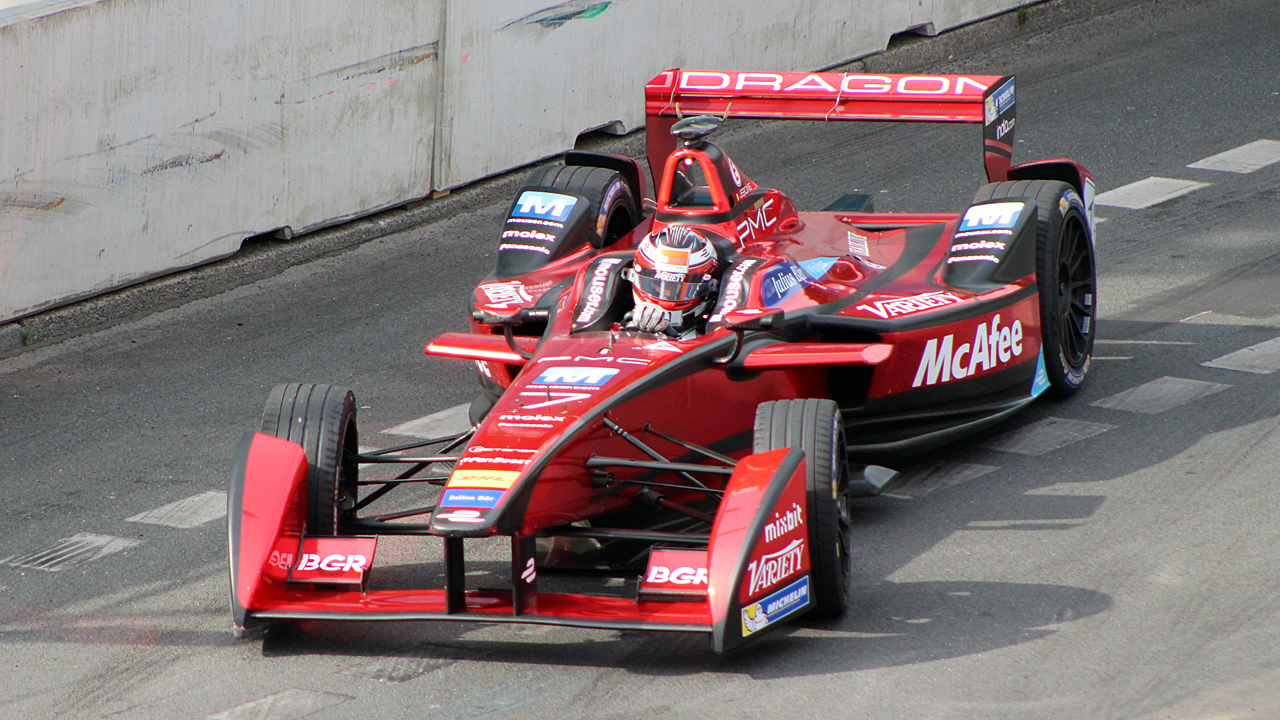
D'Ambrosio competing at the 2018 Berlin ePrix

D'Ambrosio raced for Dragon Racing for a fourth successive season in the 2017/18 FIA Formula E Championship. The team's technical partnership with Faraday Future came to an early conclusion as a result of financial difficulties for the startup. The team's package again proved to be uncompetitive and d'Ambrosio registered his first points of the season at the 2018 Santiago ePrix by finishing eighth. He took further points in Punta del Este and Rome. At the 2018 Zürich ePrix, d'Ambrosio returned to the podium for the first time since the 2016 London ePrix by finishing third. This result marked his best result of the season, in which he finished 14th in the Drivers' Championship with 27 points, beating team-mates José María López and Neel Jani.

==== Mahindra ====
On 13 October 2018, it was announced that d'Ambrosio would leave Dragon Racing to join Mahindra Racing for the 2018–19 Formula E Championship.

===== 2018–19 =====
D'Ambrosio finished third in the first race of the season in Diriyah and secured his third victory in the series at the 2019 Marrakesh ePrix. After taking further points finishes in Santiago, Mexico City, Sanya and Rome, d'Ambrosio led the Drivers' Championship at the mid-way point of the season. The second half of his campaign was much less successful, with points only falling in New York. He ended the season in 11th in the Drivers' Championship with 67 points, beating team-mate Pascal Wehrlein.

===== 2019–2020 =====
D'Ambrosio continued with Mahindra Racing for the 2019–20 Formula E Championship, with the team entering a powertrain partnership with ZF Friedrichshafen. The team's car struggled for efficiency in race conditions. D'Ambrosio scored points in the first race of the season in Diriyah and registered his best finish in the first part of the 2020 Berlin ePrix following Formula E's five-month hiatus as a result of the COVID-19 pandemic. He finished 16th in the Drivers' Championship with 19 points, beating team-mates Wehrlein and Alex Lynn. At the end of the season, d'Ambrosio announced his official retirement from professional competition and ended his career with an 18th-placed finish in Berlin.

=== Other appearances ===
D'Ambrosio featured in the first episode of the Amazon motoring show "The Grand Tour" as a test driver putting in lap times for the LaFerrari, Porsche 918 and McLaren P1.

== Management career ==
=== Formula E ===
==== Venturi Racing (2020–2022) ====
On 30 October 2020, d'Ambrosio joined ROKiT Venturi Racing as Deputy Team Principal for the 2020–21 Formula E World Championship, taking his first steps into motor racing team management. In November, 2021, he was promoted to the role of Team Principal following a management restructure, with former team boss, Susie Wolff, being appointed to the position of chief executive officer.

Under d'Ambrosio's leadership, ROKiT Venturi Racing experienced its most successful campaign to date in the 2021–22 Formula E World Championship, with the team winning five races and scoring ten podiums in sixteen races while also finishing second in the World Teams' Championship with 295 points. On 16 September 2022, it was announced that d'Ambrosio had left the team ahead of its transition to Maserati MSG Racing for Season 9.

=== 2023–present: Formula One ===
==== Mercedes-AMG Petronas F1 Team (2023–2024) ====
D'Ambrosio had been working closely with Mercedes-AMG Petronas F1 Team Team Principal Toto Wolff at the start of the 2023 Formula One World Championship on an informal basis. At the 2023 Saudi Arabian Grand Prix, Wolff announced that d'Ambrosio had acquired a formal role as the Driver Development Director for the team. He looked after and managed all of Mercedes' young drivers in various motorsports categories. After Wolff underwent knee surgery following the Singapore Grand Prix, d'Ambrosio replaced Wolff in Japan until the Qatar Grand Prix.

==== Scuderia Ferrari (2024–present) ====
Scuderia Ferrari announced in May 2024 that d'Ambrosio would be joining their team beginning on 1 October 2024, working as Deputy Team Principal and Head of the Ferrari Driver Academy, the outfit's young driver development program.

== Personal life ==
In 2013, d'Ambrosio married the American-Chilean model Natalie "Natty" Sifferman at St. Nicholas Catholic Church in La Hulpe, Belgium. They divorced after two years of marriage. On 20 July 2020, d'Ambrosio married Austrian jewellery designer, Eleonore von Habsburg at the Civil Registry of Monaco, in a ceremony conducted by the Monaco mayor Georges Marsan. On 20 October 2021, Eleonore gave birth to their son, Otto d'Ambrosio, named after her grandfather, Otto von Habsburg. On 10 August 2024, a daughter, Zita d'Ambrosio, was born, named after her Eleonore's great-grandmother Zita von Habsburg.

On 4 July 2026 a daughter was born, named Cosima.

== Racing record ==
=== Career summary ===
Season	Series	Team name	Races	Wins	Poles	F/Laps	Podiums	Points	Position
2003	Formula Renault 1.6 Belgium	Thierry Boutsen Racing	14	5	3	7	?	?	**1st**
2003	Formula König	N/A	12	4	3	7	9	240	4th
2004	Championnat de France Formula Renault 2.0	Graff Racing	14	0	0	2	2	156	4th
2004	Eurocup Formula Renault 2.0	Graff Racing	7	0	0	0	0	28	16th
2005	Formula Renault 2.0 Italia	Euronova Racing	17	1	1	0	4	199	4th
2005	Formula Renault 2.0 Italia Winter Series	Euronova Racing	4	2	0	?	2	40	**3rd**
2005	Eurocup Formula Renault 2.0	Euronova Racing	6	0	0	0	2	22	15th
2005	Italian Formula 3000 Light	Euronova Racing	1	0	1	0	1	9	6th
2006	Euroseries 3000	Euronova Racing	10	0	0	1	3	39	5th
2006	Formula Renault 3.5 Series	Tech 1 Racing	7	0	0	0	0	0	36th
2006	FIA GT Championship – GT2	Belgian Racing	1	0	0	0	0	0	NC
2007	International Formula Master	Cram Competition	16	5	1	7	11	100	**1st**
2008	GP2 Series	DAMS	20	0	0	0	2	21	11th
2008	GP2 Asia Series	DAMS	10	0	0	0	2	12	11th
2008–09	GP2 Asia Series	DAMS	11	0	1	2	4	36	**2nd**
2009	GP2 Series	DAMS	20	0	0	0	3	29	9th
2010	GP2 Series	DAMS	18	1	1	0	2	21	12th
2010	Formula One	Virgin Racing	Test driver						
2011	Formula One	Marussia Virgin Racing	19	0	0	0	0	0	24th
2012	Formula One	Lotus F1 Team	1	0	0	0	0	0	23rd
2013	Formula One	Lotus F1 Team	Reserve driver						
2014	Blancpain Endurance Series	M-Sport	5	0	0	0	0	15	17th
2014–15	Formula E	Dragon Racing	11	1	0	0	3	113	4th
2015–16	Formula E	Dragon Racing	10	1	2	1	3	83	5th
2016–17	Formula E	Faraday Future Dragon Racing	12	0	0	0	0	13	18th
2017–18	Formula E	Dragon Racing	12	0	0	1	1	27	14th
2018	Stock Car Brasil	Cimed Racing Team	1	0	0	0	0	0	NC†
2018–19	Formula E	Mahindra Racing	13	1	0	0	2	67	11th
2019–20	Formula E	Mahindra Racing	10	0	0	0	0	19	16th

^{†} As d'Ambrosio was a guest driver, he was ineligible for points.

=== Complete Championnat de France Formula Renault 2.0 results ===
(key) (Races in bold indicate pole position) (Races in italics indicate fastest lap)

Year	Team	1	2	3	4	5	6	7	8	9	10	11	12	13	14	Pos	Points
2004	Graff Racing	NOG; 1; 8	NOG; 2; 26	VIE; 1 Ret	VIE; 2; 4	PAU; 1; 4	PAU; 2; 4	DIJ; 1; 3	DIJ; 2; 3	ALB; 1; 4	ALB; 2; 4	LEM; 1; 9	LEM; 2 Ret	MAG; 1; 4	MAG; 2; 4	4th	156

=== Complete Eurocup Formula Renault 2.0 results ===
(key) (Races in bold indicate pole position; races in italics indicate fastest lap)

Year	Entrant	1	2	3	4	5	6	7	8	9	10	11	12	13	14	15	16	17	DC	Points
2004	Graff Racing	MNZ; 1; 25	MNZ; 2 Ret	VAL; 1; 4	VAL; 2; 5	MAG; 1; 13	MAG; 2; 14	HOC; 1	HOC; 2	BRN; 1	BRN; 2	DON; 1	DON; 2	SPA; 15	IMO; 1	IMO; 2	OSC; 1	OSC; 2	15th	28
2005	Euronova Racing	ZOL; 1; 3	ZOL; 2; 2	VAL; 1	VAL; 2	LMS; 1	LMS; 2	BIL; 1	BIL; 2	OSC; 1	OSC; 2	DON; 1	DON; 2	EST; 1; 20	EST; 2; 28	MNZ; 1 Ret	MNZ; 2; 15		15th	22

=== Complete Formula Renault 2.0 Italia results ===
(key) (Races in bold indicate pole position) (Races in italics indicate fastest lap)

Year	Team	1	2	3	4	5	6	7	8	9	10	11	12	13	14	15	16	17	Pos	Points
2005	Euronova Racing	VLL; 1; 3	VLL; 2; 5	IMO; 1; 27	IMO; 2; 7	SPA; 1; 2	SPA; 2; 4	MNZ1; 1; 12	MNZ1; 2; 6	MNZ1; 3; 5	MUG; 1; 3	MUG; 2; 7	MIS; 1; 5	MIS; 2; 4	MIS; 3; 7	**VAR**; 1	MNZ2; 1; 9	MNZ2; 2; 4	4th	179

=== Complete Italian F3000/Euroseries 3000 results ===
(key) (Races in bold indicate pole position) (Races in italics indicate fastest lap)

Year	Team	1	2	3	4	5	6	7	8	9	10	11	12	13	14	15	16	17	18	Pos	Points
2005	Euronova Racing	ADR	VLL	BRN	IMO	MUG	MAG; 12	MNZ	MIS											32nd	0
2006	Euronova Racing	ADR; 1	ADR; 2	IMO; 1	IMO; 2	SPA; 1	SPA; 2	HUN; 1	HUN; 2	MUG; 1; 5	MUG; 2 Ret	SIL; 1; 2	SIL; 2; 5	CAT; 1; 4	CAT; 2 Ret	VLL; 1; 2	VLL; 2; 5	MIS; 1; 3	MIS; 2; 4	5th	39

=== Complete 24 Hours of Spa results ===
Year	Team	Co-Drivers	Car	Class	Laps	Pos.	Class Pos.
2005	(Belgium) Belgian Racing	(Belgium) Sylvie Delcour (Belgium) Renaud Kuppens (Belgium) Bas Leinders	Gillet Vertigo Streiff	G2	84	DNF	DNF
2006	(Belgium) Belgian Racing	(Belgium) Renaud Kuppens (Belgium) Bas Leinders	Gillet Vertigo Streiff	G2	43	DNF	DNF
2014	(United Kingdom) M-Sport Bentley	(France) Antoine Leclerc (United Kingdom) Duncan Tappy	Bentley Continental GT3	Pro Cup	512	17th	11th

=== Complete Formula Renault 3.5 Series results ===
(key) (Races in bold indicate pole position) (Races in italics indicate fastest lap)

Year	Team	1	2	3	4	5	6	7	8	9	10	11	12	13	14	15	16	17	Pos	Points
2006	Tech 1 Racing	ZOL; 1; 19	ZOL; 2; 19†	MON; 1; 12	IST; 1; 14	IST; 2; 22	MIS; 1; 16	MIS; 2; 19	SPA; 1	SPA; 2	NÜR; 1	NÜR; 2	DON; 1	DON; 2	LMS; 1	LMS; 2	CAT; 1	CAT; 2	36th	0

^{†} Driver did not finish the race, but was classified as he completed more than 90% of the race distance.

=== Complete International Formula Master results ===
(key) (Races in bold indicate pole position) (Races in italics indicate fastest lap)

Year	Team	1	2	3	4	5	6	7	8	9	10	11	12	13	14	15	16	Pos	Points
2007	Cram Competition	VAL; 1; 6	VAL; 2; 2	PAU; 1; 3	PAU; 2; 3	BRN; 1; 1	BRN; 2; 1	BOA; 1; 3	BOA; 2 Ret	AND; 1; 2	AND; 2; 16	OSC; 1; 1	OSC; 2; 8	**BRH**; **1**; 1	BRH; 2; 5	MNZ; 1; 1	MNZ; 2; 2	1st	100

=== Complete GP2 Series results ===
(key) (Races in bold indicate pole position)

Year	Entrant	1	2	3	4	5	6	7	8	9	10	11	12	13	14	15	16	17	18	19	20	DC	Points
2008	DAMS	CAT; FEA; Ret	CAT; SPR; 15	IST; FEA; Ret	IST; SPR; Ret	MON; FEA; 9	MON; SPR; 7	MAG; FEA; 6	MAG; SPR; Ret	SIL; FEA; 9	SIL; SPR; 12	HOC; FEA; Ret	HOC; SPR; 11	HUN; FEA; 9	HUN; SPR; Ret	VAL; FEA; 5	VAL; SPR; 2	SPA; FEA; 8	SPA; SPR; 2	MNZ; FEA; 7	MNZ; SPR; 6	11th	21
2009	DAMS	CAT; FEA; 3	CAT; SPR; 3	MON; FEA; 6	MON; SPR; 2	IST; FEA; Ret	IST; SPR; 15	SIL; FEA; 19	SIL; SPR; 12	NÜR; FEA; 10	NÜR; SPR; 7	HUN; FEA; 16	HUN; SPR; Ret	VAL; FEA; 9	VAL; SPR; 4	SPA; FEA; Ret	SPA; SPR; Ret	MNZ; FEA; 4	MNZ; SPR; 4	ALG; FEA; Ret	ALG; SPR; 10	9th	29
2010	DAMS	CAT; FEA; Ret	CAT; SPR; 10	MON; FEA; 8	MON; SPR; 1	IST; FEA; 10	IST; SPR; 8	VAL; FEA; Ret	VAL; SPR; 8	SIL; FEA; 11	SIL; SPR; 11	HOC; FEA	HOC; SPR	HUN; FEA; 6	HUN; SPR; Ret	**SPA**; **FEA**; Ret	SPA; SPR; Ret	MNZ; FEA; 5	MNZ; SPR; 2	YMC; FEA; 14	YMC; SPR; 8	12th	21

==== Complete GP2 Asia Series results ====
(key) (Races in bold indicate pole position; races in italics indicate fastest lap)

Year	Entrant	1	2	3	4	5	6	7	8	9	10	11	12	DC	Points
2008	DAMS	DUB1; FEA; 11	DUB1; SPR; 8	SEN; FEA; Ret	SEN; SPR; Ret	SEP; FEA; 3	SEP; SPR; Ret	BHR; FEA; 11	BHR; SPR; 12	DUB2; FEA; 7	DUB2; SPR; 3			11th	12
2008–09	DAMS	SHI; FEA; 9	SHI; SPR; 5	DUB; FEA; 7	DUB; SPR; C	BHR1; FEA; 2	BHR1; SPR; 3	LSL; FEA; 5	LSL; SPR; 7	**SEP**; **FEA**; DNS	MYS; SPR; DSQ	BHR2; FEA; 3	BHR2; SPR; 2	**2nd**	**36**

=== Complete Formula One results ===
(key)

Year	Entrant	Chassis	Engine	1	2	3	4	5	6	7	8	9	10	11	12	13	14	15	16	17	18	19	20	WDC	Points
2010	Virgin Racing	Virgin VR-01	Cosworth CA2010 2.4 V8	BHR	AUS	MAL	CHN	ESP	MON	TUR	CAN	EUR	GBR	GER	HUN	BEL	ITA	SIN; TD	JPN; TD	KOR; TD	BRA; TD	ABU		–	–
2011	Marussia Virgin Racing	Virgin MVR-02	Cosworth CA2011 2.4 V8	AUS; 14	MAL; Ret	CHN; 20	TUR; 20	ESP; 20	MON; 15	CAN; 14	EUR; 22	GBR; 17	GER; 18	HUN; 19	BEL; 17	ITA; Ret	SIN; 18	JPN; 21	KOR; 20	IND; 16	ABU; Ret	BRA; 19		24th	0
2012	Lotus F1 Team	Lotus E20	Renault RS27-2012 2.4 V8	AUS	MAL	CHN	BHR	ESP	MON	CAN	EUR	GBR	GER	HUN	BEL	ITA; 13	SIN	JPN	KOR	IND	ABU	USA	BRA	23rd	0

=== Complete Formula E results ===
(key) (Races in bold indicate pole position; races in italics indicate fastest lap)

Year	Team	Chassis	Powertrain	1	2	3	4	5	6	7	8	9	10	11	12	13	Pos	Points
2014–15	Dragon Racing	Spark SRT01-e	SRT01-e	BEI; 6	PUT; 5	PDE; 8	BUE; 14	MIA; 4	LBH; 6	MCO; 5	BER; 1	MSC; 11	LDN; 2	LDN; 2			4th	113
2015–16	Dragon Racing	Spark SRT01-e	Venturi VM200-FE-01	BEI; 5	PUT; 14†	**PDE**; 3	BUE; 16	**MEX**; 1	LBH; 7	PAR; 11	BER; 16	LDN; 8	LDN; 3				5th	83
2016–17	Faraday Future Dragon Racing	Spark SRT01-e	Penske 701-EV	HKG; 7	MRK; 13	BUE; 8	MEX; 14	MCO; Ret	PAR; Ret	BER; 13	BER; 13	NYC; Ret	NYC; 10	MTL; 11	MTL; 9		18th	13
2017–18	Dragon Racing	Spark SRT01-e	Penske EV-2	HKG; NC	HKG; 15	MRK; 15	SCL; 8	MEX; 11	PDE; 9	RME; 7	PAR; 12	BER; 19	ZUR; 3	NYC; 13	NYC; Ret		14th	27
2018–19	Mahindra Racing	Spark SRT05e	Mahindra M5Electro	ADR; 3	MRK; 1	SCL; 10	MEX; 4	HKG; Ret	SYX; 6	RME; 8	PAR; Ret	MCO; 11	BER; 17	BRN; 13	NYC; 9	NYC; 11	11th	67
2019–20	Mahindra Racing	Spark SRT05e	Mahindra M6Electro	DIR; 9	DIR; DNS	SCL; NC	MEX; 10	MRK; 13	BER; 5	BER; DSQ	BER; 7	BER; 15	BER; 16	BER; 18			16th	19

^{†} Driver did not finish the race, but was classified as he completed more than 90% of the race distance.

Sporting positions
Preceded by Jan Charouz	International Formula Master; Champion; 2007	Succeeded by Chris van der Drift
