= Alex Ciompi =

Italian racing driver

- Nationality: (Italy) Italian
- Born: 16 June 1985 (age 41) Massa Marittima (Italy)

Alessandro "Alex" Ciompi (born 16 June 1985 in Massa Marittima) is an Italian former racing driver. In 2004, he earned best novice driver at the Formula 3000 series. He has competed in such series as Euroseries 3000, Formula Renault 3.5 Series and the Italian Formula Three Championship.

== Racing record ==
=== Complete Formula Renault 3.5 Series results ===
(key) (Races in bold indicate pole position) (Races in italics indicate fastest lap)

Year	Team	1	2	3	4	5	6	7	8	9	10	11	12	13	14	15	16	17	Pos	Points
2007	Eurointernational	MNZ; 1; 14	MNZ; 2 Ret	NÜR; 1 Ret	NÜR; 2; 21	MON; 1 Ret	HUN; 1 Ret	HUN; 2 DNS	SPA; 1; 15	SPA; 2; 18	DON; 1; 18	DON; 2; 19	MAG; 1 Ret	MAG; 2; 16	EST; 1	EST; 2	CAT; 1	CAT; 2	34th	0
