= Putrajaya ePrix =

Formula E automobile race in Putrajaya, Malaysia

- Putrajaya Street Circuit (2014–2015)

Race information
- Number of times held: 2
- First held: 2014
- Last held: 2015
- Circuit length: 2.560 km (1.591 miles)
- Race length: 84.84 km (52.47 miles)
- Laps: 33

Last race (2015)

Pole position
- (Switzerland) Sébastien Buemi; Renault e.Dams; 1:20.196

Podium
- 1. (Brazil) L. di Grassi; ABT; 50:17.449; 2. (United Kingdom) S. Bird; DS Virgin Racing; +13.884; 3. (Netherlands) R. Frijns; Amlin Andretti; +29.776

Fastest lap
- (Switzerland) Sébastien Buemi; Renault e. Dams; 1:22.748

The Putrajaya ePrix was an automobile race of the Formula E championship in Putrajaya, Malaysia, taking place in November. It was first raced in the 2014–15 season.

== Circuit ==
The ePrix was held on the Putrajaya Street Circuit. The track was specifically designed and built for Formula E. It was 2.560 km (1.591 mi) in length and featured 12 turns.

== Results ==
Edition	Track	Winner	Second	Third	Pole position	Fastest lap	Ref
2014	Putrajaya Street Circuit	(United Kingdom) Sam Bird; Virgin Racing	(Brazil) Lucas di Grassi; Audi Sport ABT	(Switzerland) Sébastien Buemi e.dams Renault	(France) Nicolas Prost e.dams Renault	(Spain) Jaime Alguersuari; Virgin Racing	
2015	Putrajaya Street Circuit	(Brazil) Lucas di Grassi; ABT Schaeffler Audi Sport	(United Kingdom) Sam Bird; DS Virgin Racing	(Netherlands) Robin Frijns; Amlin Andretti	(Switzerland) Sébastien Buemi; Renault e.Dams	(Switzerland) Sébastien Buemi; Renault e.Dams	
