= 2015 Putrajaya ePrix =

Race 2 of 10 of the 2015–16 Formula E season
← Previous race	Next race →
- Layout of the Putrajaya Street Circuit

Race details
- Date: 7 November 2015
- Official name: Y Capital Management Putrajaya ePrix
- Location: Putrajaya, Malaysia
- Course: Street circuit
- Course length: 2.56 km (1.59 miles)
- Distance: 33 laps, 84.84 km (52.47 miles)

Pole position
Driver	(Switzerland) Sébastien Buemi	Renault e.Dams
- Time: 1:20.196

Fastest lap
Driver	(Switzerland) Sébastien Buemi	Renault e.Dams
- Time: 1:22.748 (lap record) on lap 22

Podium
First	(Brazil) Lucas di Grassi	ABT Schaeffler Audi Sport
Second	(United Kingdom) Sam Bird	DS Virgin Racing
Third	(Netherlands) Robin Frijns	Amlin Andretti

The 2015 Putrajaya ePrix (officially the Y Capital Management Putrajaya ePrix), was a Formula E motor race held on 7 November 2015 at the Putrajaya Street Circuit in Putrajaya, Malaysia. It was the second edition of the Putrajaya ePrix and the second championship race of the 2015–16 Formula E season. The race was won by Lucas di Grassi.

== Report ==
=== Background ===
The Trulli team did not participate in Putrajaya; they already failed to participate two weeks earlier in Beijing. This time, the team presented its Motormatica JT-01 for scrutineering, but the car did not pass all of the mandatory checks.

== Classifications ==
=== Qualifying ===
Pos.	No.	Driver	Team	Time	Gap	Grid
1	9	(Switzerland) Sébastien Buemi	Renault e.Dams	1:19.821		1^{1}
2	4	(France) Stéphane Sarrazin	Venturi	1:20.213	+0.392	PL^{1}
3	6	(France) Loïc Duval	Dragon Racing	1:20.251	+0.430	3^{1}
4	8	(France) Nicolas Prost	Renault e.Dams	1:20.401	+0.580	5^{1}
5	55	(Portugal) António Félix da Costa	Team Aguri	1:20.414	+0.593	4^{1}
6	11	(Brazil) Lucas di Grassi	ABT Schaeffler Audi Sport	1:20.449	+0.628	6
7	7	(Belgium) Jérôme d'Ambrosio	Dragon Racing	1:20.496	+0.675	7
8	27	(Netherlands) Robin Frijns	Amlin Andretti	1:20.546	+0.725	8
9	21	(Brazil) Bruno Senna	Mahindra Racing	1:20.616	+0.795	9
10	66	(Germany) Daniel Abt	ABT Schaeffler Audi Sport	1:20.679	+0.858	10
11	23	(Germany) Nick Heidfeld	Mahindra Racing	1:20.727	+0.906	11
12	12	(Canada) Jacques Villeneuve	Venturi	1:20.754	+0.933	12
13	25	(France) Jean-Éric Vergne	DS Virgin Racing	1:20.820	+0.999	13
14	2	(United Kingdom) Sam Bird	DS Virgin Racing	1:20.905	+1.084	14
15	77	(France) Nathanaël Berthon	Team Aguri	1:21.270	+1.449	15
16	1	(Brazil) Nelson Piquet Jr.	NEXTEV TCR	1:21.559	+1.738	16
17	88	(United Kingdom) Oliver Turvey	NEXTEV TCR	1:21.611	+1.790	17
18	28	(Switzerland) Simona de Silvestro	Amlin Andretti	1:21.958	+2.137	18

Notes:

- ^1 – Final grid position of top five qualifiers determined by Super Pole shootout.

=== Super Pole ===
Pos.	No.	Driver	Team	Time	Gap	Grid
1	9	(Switzerland) Sébastien Buemi	Renault e.Dams	1:20.196		1
2	4	(France) Stéphane Sarrazin	Venturi	1:20.639	+0.443	PL
3	6	(France) Loïc Duval	Dragon Racing	1:20.886	+0.690	3
4	55	(Portugal) António Félix da Costa	Team Aguri	1:20.975	+0.779	4
5	8	(France) Nicolas Prost	Renault e.Dams	1:21.786	+1.590	5

=== Race ===
Pos.	No.	Driver	Team	Laps	Time/Retired	Grid	Points
1	11	(Brazil) Lucas di Grassi	ABT Schaeffler Audi Sport	33	50:17.449	6	25
2	2	(United Kingdom) Sam Bird	DS Virgin Racing	33	+13.884	14	18
3	27	(Netherlands) Robin Frijns	Amlin Andretti	33	+29.776	8	15
4	4	(France) Stéphane Sarrazin	Venturi	33	+32.628	PL	12
5	21	(Brazil) Bruno Senna	Mahindra Racing	33	+34.404	9	10
6	55	(Portugal) António Félix da Costa	Team Aguri	33	+36.925	4	8
7	66	(Germany) Daniel Abt	ABT Schaeffler Audi Sport	33	+37.283	10	6
8	1	(Brazil) Nelson Piquet Jr.	NEXTEV TCR	33	+40.623	16	4
9	23	(Germany) Nick Heidfeld	Mahindra Racing	33	+52.904	11	2
10	8	(France) Nicolas Prost	Renault e.dams	33	+53.695	5	1
11	12	(Canada) Jacques Villeneuve	Venturi	33	+58.698	12	
12	9	(Switzerland) Sébastien Buemi	Renault e.Dams	33	+1:07.728	1	2+3^{1}
13	28	(Switzerland) Simona de Silvestro	Amlin Andretti	33	+1:24.464	18	
14	7	(Belgium) Jérôme d'Ambrosio	Dragon Racing	32	Accident	7	
15	77	(France) Nathanaël Berthon	Team Aguri	32	+1 lap	15	
16	6	(France) Loïc Duval	Dragon Racing	29	Accident	3	
Ret	88	(United Kingdom) Oliver Turvey	NEXTEV TCR	4	Accident	17	
Ret	25	(France) Jean-Éric Vergne	DS Virgin Racing	0	Collision	13	

Notes:

- ^1 – Three points for pole position and two points for fastest lap.

== Standings after the race ==
Drivers' Championship standings

Pos	Driver	Points
1	(Brazil) Lucas di Grassi	43
2	(Switzerland) Sébastien Buemi	35
3	(United Kingdom) Sam Bird	24
4	(Germany) Nick Heidfeld	17
5	(Netherlands) Robin Frijns	16

Teams' Championship standings

Pos	Constructor	Points
1	(Germany) ABT Schaeffler Audi Sport	49
2	(France) Renault e.Dams	36
3	(India) Mahindra Racing	27
4	(United Kingdom) DS Virgin Racing	24
5	(United States) Dragon Racing	22

- Notes: Only the top five positions are included for both sets of standings.

Previous race: 2015 Beijing ePrix	FIA Formula E Championship; 2015–16 season	Next race: 2015 Punta del Este ePrix
Previous race: 2014 Putrajaya ePrix	Putrajaya ePrix	Next race: N/A
