= 2014 Putrajaya ePrix =

- Race 2 of 11 of the 2014–15 Formula E season
- Layout of the Putrajaya Street Circuit

Race details
- Date: 22 November 2014
- Official name: 2014 FIA Formula E Ycapital Management Putrajaya ePrix
- Location: Putrajaya, Malaysia
- Course: Street circuit
- Course length: 2.56 km (1.59 miles)
- Distance: 31 laps, 79.36 km (49.29 miles)

Pole position
Driver	(France) Nicolas Prost	e.dams Renault
- Time: 1:21.779

Fastest lap
Driver	(Spain) Jaime Alguersuari	Virgin Racing
- Time: 1:24.429 on lap 20

Podium
First	(United Kingdom) Sam Bird	Virgin Racing
Second	(Brazil) Lucas di Grassi	Audi Sport ABT
Third	(Switzerland) Sébastien Buemi	e.dams Renault

The 2014 Putrajaya ePrix, formally the 2014 FIA Formula E Ycapital Management Putrajaya ePrix was a Formula E motor race that was held on 22 November 2014 at the Putrajaya Street Circuit in Putrajaya, Malaysia. It was the second championship race of the single-seater, electrically powered racing car series' inaugural season.

Drivers Bruno Senna, Katherine Legge and Nick Heidfeld were awarded the "FanBoost" for the race. The race was won by British driver Sam Bird (Virgin Racing)

== Report ==
=== Background ===
The race had originally been scheduled to take place on 18 October. It was delayed until 22 November at the request of the Prime Minister of Malaysia, Najib Razak. The race start time was brought forward by two hours due to heavy rain being forecast.

=== Race ===
After Nicolas Prost had received a ten place grid penalty for causing a collision in Beijing, Oriol Servia started on pole position with Sam Bird second and Daniel Abt third. Abt made a poor start and fell back, while the whole field squeezed through the first series of tight corners without incident. At the end of the first lap, however, Katherine Legge made severe contact with Michela Cerruti and at the same time, Matthew Brabham was seen facing the wrong way in the hairpin. The safety car was brought out.

When the green flag showed at the start of the fifth lap, Bird managed to overtake Servia, which opened the door for Jarno Trulli and later Karun Chandhok to get by as well. On the eighth lap, Franck Montagny overtook Nick Heidfeld, simultaneously pushing his rival into the wall. This brought out a second safety car. Abt went into the pits, effectively extending his second stint to 21 laps.

Racing continued on the twelfth lap. Bruno Senna was soon challenging Nelson Piquet Jr. for fifth, making use of his FanBoost, but hit the wall and damaged his suspension. Meanwhile, Bird continued to lap one to three seconds per lap quicker than everyone else, extending his lead on Trulli, Chandhok, and Servia. When the leaders made their pit stops, Abt reached first position, but with only fifty percent of his power remaining. Meanwhile, Trulli was given a drive-through penalty for exceeding his power usage. He still defended his position, however, handing Piquet the opportunity to overtake Lucas di Grassi. Piquet also tried to take third off of Trulli, but was pushed into the wall and had to retire.

On lap 24, Abt was still leading in front of Bird, Di Grassi, and Sébastien Buemi. Bird, at this point, was gaining three to five seconds per lap, because Abt was having to save energy, after having pitted very early in the race. He held the lead until the 28th lap, but eventually fell back to tenth. Senna, meanwhile, used his FanBoost to pass Prost for fourth, but crashed out in the last lap. Bird took the win, with Di Grassi and Buemi next to him on the podium.

== Classification ==
=== Qualifying ===
Pos.	No.	Driver	Team	Time	Gap	Grid
1	8	(France) Nicolas Prost	e.dams-Renault	1:21.779		11^{1}
2	6	(Spain) Oriol Servia	Dragon Racing	1:22.010	+0.231	1
3	7	(Belgium) Jérôme d'Ambrosio	Dragon Racing	1:22.215	+0.436	20^{2}
4	2	(United Kingdom) Sam Bird	Virgin Racing	1:22.235	+0.456	2
5	66	(Germany) Daniel Abt	Audi Sport ABT	1:22.342	+0.563	3
6	10	(Italy) Jarno Trulli	Trulli	1:22.347	+0.568	4
7	5	(India) Karun Chandhok	Mahindra Racing	1:22.612	+0.833	5
8	99	(Brazil) Nelson Piquet Jr.	China Racing	1:22.620	+0.841	6
9	23	(Germany) Nick Heidfeld	Venturi	1:22.720	+0.941	7
10	21	(Brazil) Bruno Senna	Mahindra Racing	1:22.816	+1.037	8
11	28	(Australia) Matthew Brabham	Andretti	1:22.941	+1.162	9
12	55	(Portugal) António Félix da Costa	Amlin Aguri	1:23.194	+1.415	10
13	30	(France) Stéphane Sarrazin	Venturi	1:23.240	+1.461	12
14	27	(France) Franck Montagny	Andretti	1:23.697	+1.918	13
15	18	(Italy) Michela Cerruti	Trulli	1:23.857	+2.078	14
16	88	(China) Ho-Pin Tung	China Racing	1:23.894	+2.115	15
17	9	(Switzerland) Sébastien Buemi	e.dams-Renault	1:25.319	+3.540	19^{3}
18	77	(United Kingdom) Katherine Legge	Amlin Aguri	1:25.823	+4.044	16
19	3	(Spain) Jaime Alguersuari	Virgin Racing	No time		17
20	11	(Brazil) Lucas di Grassi	Audi Sport ABT	No time		18

Notes:

- ^1 - Nicolas Prost started with a ten place penalty for causing a collision in the previous race.
- ^2 - Jérôme d'Ambrosio was disqualified from the qualifying session for exceeding power usage limits.
- ^3 - Sebastian Buemi was disqualified from the qualifying session for an underweight car.

=== Race ===
Pos.	No.	Driver	Team	Laps	Time/Retired	Grid	Points
1	2	(United Kingdom) Sam Bird	Virgin Racing	31	51:11.979	2	25
2	11	(Brazil) Lucas di Grassi	Audi Sport ABT	31	+ 4.175	18	18
3	9	(Switzerland) Sébastien Buemi	e.dams-Renault	31	+ 5.739	19	15
4	8	(France) Nicolas Prost	e.dams-Renault	31	+ 9.552	11	12+3^{1}
5	7	(Belgium) Jérôme d'Ambrosio	Dragon Racing	31	+ 13.722	20	10
6	5	(India) Karun Chandhok	Mahindra Racing	31	+ 17.158	5	8
7	6	(Spain) Oriol Servià	Dragon Racing	31	+ 18.621	1	6
8	55	(Portugal) António Félix da Costa	Amlin Aguri	31	+19.926	10	4
9	3	(Spain) Jaime Alguersuari	Virgin Racing	31	+20.053	17	2+2^{2}
10	66	(Germany) Daniel Abt	Audi Sport ABT	31	+45.663	3	1
11	88	(China) Ho-Pin Tung	China Racing	31	+55.833	15	
12	30	(France) Stéphane Sarrazin	Venturi	31	+56.626	12	
13	28	(Australia) Matthew Brabham	Andretti	31	+1:05.036	9	
14	21	(Brazil) Bruno Senna	Mahindra Racing	30	Accident	8	
15	77	(United Kingdom) Katherine Legge	Amlin Aguri	28	+3 laps^{3}	16	
16	10	(Italy) Jarno Trulli	Trulli	28	+3 laps^{3}	4	
Ret	99	(Brazil) Nelson Piquet Jr.	China Racing	22	Collision	7	
Ret	18	(Italy) Michela Cerruti	Trulli	7	Collision	14	
DSQ	27	(France) Franck Montagny	Andretti	30	Drug testing^{4}	13	
EX	23	(Germany) Nick Heidfeld	Venturi	14	Illegal car change^{5}	8	

Notes:

- ^1 – Three points for winning qualifying.
- ^2 – Two points for fastest lap.
- ^3 -Katherine Legge and Jarno Trulli have been given a drive through penalty converted into a 23-seconds time penalty for causing a collision.
- ^4 - Franck Montagny was disqualified from the race on 27 March 2015 after testing positive for a banned substance.
- ^5 - Nick Heidfeld was excluded from his nineteenth position finish for changing his car outside the permitted area during his pit stop. This meant his result at Putrajaya was not counted toward his championship points.

== Standings after the race ==
Drivers' Championship standings

Pos	Driver	Points
1	(Brazil) Lucas di Grassi	43
2	(United Kingdom) Sam Bird	40
3	(France) Franck Montagny	18
4	(France) Nicolas Prost	18
5	(Belgium) Jérôme d'Ambrosio	18

Teams' Championship standings

Pos	Constructor	Points
1	(Germany) Audi Sport ABT	45
2	(United Kingdom) Virgin Racing	44
3	(France) e.dams-Renault	33
4	(United States) Andretti	30
5	(United States) Dragon Racing	30

- Notes: Only the top five positions are included for both sets of standings.

Previous race: 2014 Beijing ePrix	FIA Formula E Championship; 2014–15 season	Next race: 2014 Punta del Este ePrix
Previous race: N/A	Putrajaya ePrix	Next race: 2015 Putrajaya ePrix
