= Putrajaya Street Circuit =

Street circuit in Malaysia

- Location: Putrajaya, Malaysia
- Coordinates: 2°55′33″N 101°41′17″E
- Opened: 21 November 2014; 11 years ago
- Closed: 7 November 2015; 10 years ago
- Major events: Formula E Putrajaya ePrix (2014–2015)

Street Circuit (2014–2015)
- Length: 2.560 km (1.591 mi)
- Turns: 14
- Race lap record: 1:22.748 ( (Switzerland) Sébastien Buemi, Renault Z.E 15, 2015, Formula E)

Putrajaya Street Circuit was a street circuit which was first used on 22 November 2014 during the second ePrix of Formula E. The start-and-finish straight ran on one of the major highways – Persiaran Perdana, or Putrajaya Boulevard – and just north of the circuit is the Perdana Putra housing the Prime Minister's Office. The track was 2.560 km (1.591 mi) in length and featured 12 turns. It was designed by British architect Simon Gibbons, who brought experience of nine years with FOM as circuit planning manager and more recently played a significant role in the rowing and canoeing venue for the London 2012 Olympic and Paralympic Games.

== Driver comments ==
Daniel Abt, Audi Sport ABT: "The track layout looks very interesting and has a lot of different corners. You have a chicane at Turn 1 after the main straight which gives a good first opportunity for overtaking and slipstream battles. Then you have a mix of slow and medium speed corners which is good for keeping the field very tight and will ensure close racing. I think the next very good overtaking spot will be T6 which is in front of the Fan Zone and should give the spectators a great view of the action. T9 meanwhile reminds me of the very tight hairpin at Macau. All in all the layout looks really promising and will for sure provide great racing."

Sam Bird, Virgin Racing: "The track is quite a bit shorter than Beijing. I think it’ll be higher in terms of energy output for the distance than we saw in Beijing. It’s a little bit more high speed and there’s some long straights. (...) Looking for overtaking zones, you have to say Turn 3, possibly T4, possibly T7 and T12 and maybe T10 down the inside will be the main overtaking zones. I can’t really see anyone making a lunge into 1 – it’s not enough of a brake really."

== See also ==
- Kuala Lumpur Street Circuit
