= Lucas di Grassi =

Brazilian racing driver (born 1984)

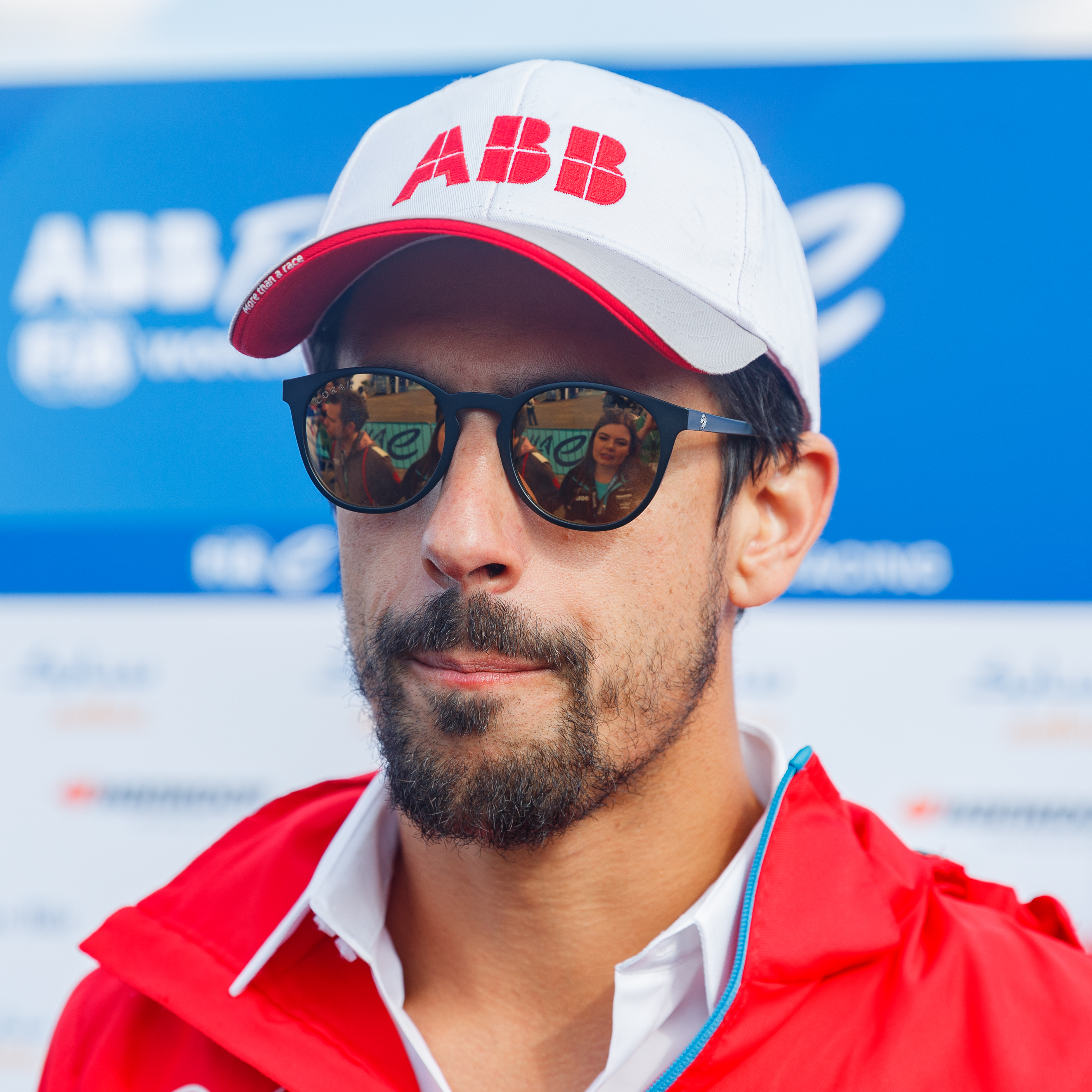
- Di Grassi in 2023
- Born: Lucas Tucci di Grassi; 11 August 1984 (age 42); São Paulo, Brazil
- Spouse: Bianca Diniz Caloi (m. 2013)
- Children: 1

Formula E career
- Debut season: 2014–15
- Current team: Lola Yamaha ABT
- Categorisation: FIA Platinum
- Car number: 11; 1 (2017–2018) (Note: Di Grassi competed using the number 1 during his World Championship defence in 2017–18.)
- Former teams: Audi, Venturi, Mahindra
- Starts: 153
- Championships: 1 (2016–17)
- Wins: 14
- Podiums: 42
- Poles: 4
- Fastest laps: 12
- Finished last season: 17th (32 pts)

FIA World Endurance Championship career
- Years active: 2012–2016
- Teams: Audi
- Starts: 28
- Championships: 0
- Wins: 2
- Podiums: 14
- Poles: 3
- Fastest laps: 2
- Best finish: 2nd in 2016 (LMP1)

Formula One World Championship career
- Nationality: (Brazil) Brazilian
- Active years: 2010
- Team: Virgin
- Entries: 19 (18 starts)
- Championships: 0
- Wins: 0
- Podiums: 0
- Career points: 0
- Pole positions: 0
- Fastest laps: 0
- First entry: 2010 Bahrain Grand Prix
- Last entry: 2010 Abu Dhabi Grand Prix

24 Hours of Le Mans career
- Years: 2013–2016
- Teams: Audi
- Best finish: 2nd (2014)
- Class wins: 0

Previous series
- 2021; 2014–2019; 2006–2009; 2003, 2005; 2004; 2003; 2002: DTM; Stock Car Brasil; GP2 Series; F3 Euro Series; British F3; F3 Sudamericana; Brazilian Formula Renault

Championship titles
- 2005 2016-17: Macau Grand Prix; Formula E

Lucas Tucci di Grassi (born 11 August 1984) is a Brazilian former racing driver, who last competed in Formula E for Lola Yamaha ABT. In formula racing, di Grassi competed in Formula One in 2010, and won the 2016–17 Formula E Championship with Abt. In endurance racing, di Grassi was runner-up in the FIA World Endurance Championship in 2016 with Audi.

Born in São Paulo, di Grassi began racing karts at the age of ten and achieved early success in the regional and later national kart series. He progressed to car racing in 2002 and was the runner-up in the Formula Renault 2.0 Brazil and Formula 3 Sudamericana championships. Di Grassi took two consecutive victories in the 2004 British Formula Three Championship and progressed to the Euro Series the following year, which saw him clinch a solitary race victory and was the winner of the non-championship Macau Grand Prix. After that, he spent the next three years in the GP2 Series where he won four races and finished as runner-up in 2007 to Timo Glock.

Di Grassi drove in Formula One with the Virgin Racing team in 2010 but was dropped for the following season. He was subsequently employed by Pirelli in mid-2011 as their official tyre tester and developed the company's next generation of tyres. Di Grassi continued this role into 2012. For the next four seasons, he drove for Audi Sport Team Joest in the FIA World Endurance Championship and took a best finish of second with two victories in 2016. Since 2014, di Grassi has raced in Formula E and has scored thirteen victories and won the 2016–17 Drivers' Championship.

In July 2020, di Grassi was announced as co-founder and Sustainability Ambassador of the ESkootr Championship, which was launched in May 2022.

== Early and personal life ==
Di Grassi was born on 11 August 1984 in São Paulo, Brazil. He is of Italian descent through his grandfather who came from Polignano a Mare. Di Grassi's family did not have a background in motor racing but his uncle owned a go-kart shop and di Grassi visited him driving go-karts every weekend between the ages of seven and eight. He was educated at the local Santa Cruz High School and later went on to graduate with a degree in Economics after his second year at the private business university Ibmec. Di Grassi married the designer Bianca Diniz Caloi in a ceremony held in the São Paulo municipality of Itirapina on 1 December 2013. He currently resides in Monaco. On 3 July 2018, di Grassi became a father with the birth of his son Leonardo.

Di Grassi founded the fuel conservation non-governmental organisation Smarter Driving in 2007, and was appointed the United Nations Environment Programme's clean air ambassador in 2018. Di Grassi partakes in triathlons to maintain his fitness and balance his racing career. He is also a member of the high-IQ society Mensa. In addition to his native Portuguese, he is fluent in English, Italian, Spanish, and has basic knowledge of French.

== Early career ==
=== Karting and early junior formulae ===
Upon the invitation of his father, Vito, the former vice-president of the Brazilian heavy vehicles manufacturer Engesa, di Grassi made his karting debut at the age of ten. He won a karting series in São Paulo in 1997, and continued to progress upwards through the South American karting series by winning several races in his native country. The peak of di Grassi's karting career came in 2000 when he placed fifth overall in the Formula A World Championship. That year, he won the Pan American Kart Championship. Di Grassi made his car racing debut in 2002, driving in the Formula Renault 2.0 Brazil, finishing the season with two victories, and placed seven points behind the series victor Sérgio Jimenez. In 2003, he switched to the Formula 3 Sudamericana and joined the Avellone team. Di Grassi took one victory and stood on the podium eleven times, en route to second in the championship, behind the more experienced Danilo Dirani, despite missing the season's final six races due to him injuring his neck in an accident he sustained in Curitiba.

Di Grassi elected to move to the United Kingdom in 2004 so he could take part in the British Formula Three Championship with Hitech Racing. Di Grassi won both races at the Thruxton meeting, but the remainder of the season was difficult for him, and he could only muster eighth in the final standings in spite of good qualifying performances. He was invited to race in the season-ending Macau Grand Prix and came third. Di Grassi graduated to the Formula 3 Euro Series in 2005 with Manor Motorsport but started the season with a major accident at the Hockenheimring where he attempted to pass Giedo van der Garde but clipped the latter's rear-left wheel. He launched into the air and rolled several times before resting in the tyre barrier. Di Grassi recovered to have a solid season and took a lights-to-flag victory at the Oschersleben and came third in the championship. He took a third-place finish at the Masters of Formula 3, and won the end-of-the season Macau Grand Prix from third on the grid by passing Robert Kubica shortly after a safety car restart in the closing stages of the event.

=== GP2 Series and Formula One testing (2006–2009) ===
2006 brought di Grassi to the next stage of his career as he entered the GP2 Series support series with the unsuccessful Durango team and was partnered by the Spanish driver Sergio Hernández. While his local rival Nelson Piquet Jr. battled Lewis Hamilton for the championship, di Grassi struggled with a noncompetitive car and could only muster eight points throughout the course of the season. With assistance from the Renault Formula One team, he signed a contract to race for ART Grand Prix in the 2007 season in December 2006 and was partnered for the first round by Michael Ammermüller. He scored points consistently throughout the season, failing to score only once in the first thirteen races. Despite not winning a race in that time, it put di Grassi in contention for the championship along with iSport driver Timo Glock.

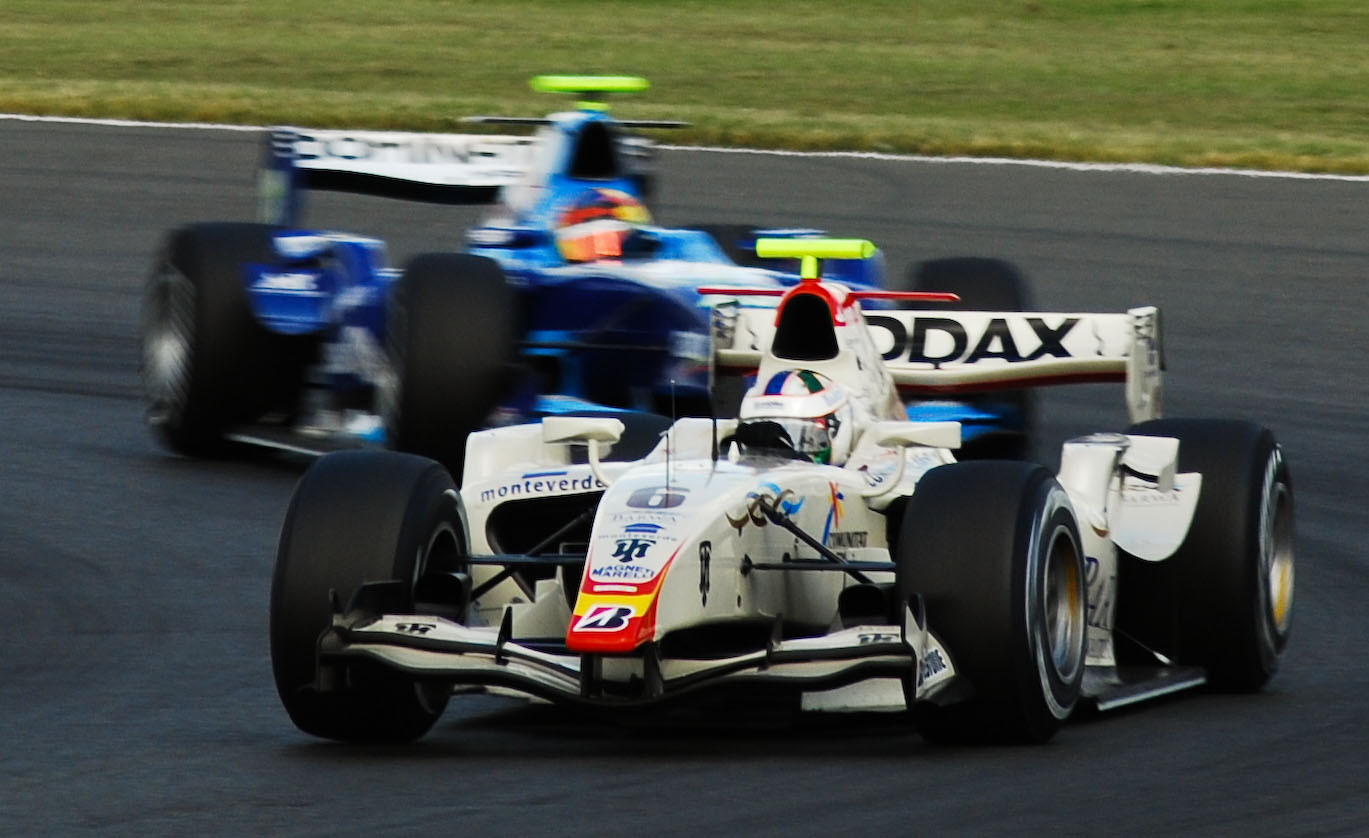
Di Grassi driving for Campos Grand Prix at the Silverstone round of the 2008 GP2 Series

Di Grassi scored his first win of the year in the fourteenth round of the season at Istanbul, and took the lead of the championship, but Glock moved back ahead of him when he won the sprint race at the same track. Heading into the final race of the season at Valencia, di Grassi was two points adrift of Glock and said that he was not worried over outside factors determining the title. In changeable weather conditions, di Grassi started on wet tyres, but the rain let up, and he entered the pit lane after two laps for the slick tyres. He pushed too hard on the slippery surface and beached his car in the gravel trap. Glock took the victory in the sprint race and earned one additional point for the fastest lap to clinch the title while di Grassi struggled throughout to finish outside of the top ten.

Di Grassi had no intentions of remaining in GP2 for 2008 as due to his relationship with Renault, he was developing the series's new Dallara GP2/08 chassis in addition to his Formula One test and reserve driver duties. However, he resumed his GP2 career that year by securing a drive at Campos Racing from round four onwards, replacing the 2007 Formula Renault 3.5 Series runner-up Ben Hanley. With three-second places and one fourth-place finish, di Grassi was the highest-scoring driver over the first two race meetings in which he took part. Two wins followed and he briefly looked set for a surprising championship challenge, before a final lap collision with Giorgio Pantano (who was disqualified for the incident) at Spa-Francorchamps effectively ended di Grassi's hopes. He finished an eventual third, ten points behind Pantano despite six fewer races.

Di Grassi sought to race in Formula One in 2009 with Renault and speculation arose in the motor sport press over him replacing fellow countryman Nelson Piquet Jr. after the latter's poor performance compared to his teammate Fernando Alonso. Renault looked at running either di Grassi or fellow test driver Romain Grosjean for the season, but eventually chose to keep Piquet and Alonso. He along with the 2008 GP2 Series runner-up Bruno Senna were strongly considered by Ross Brawn to drive for Honda. The pair tested the Honda RA108 at the Circuit de Catalunya in mid-November, which had di Grassi lap within half a second of Senna's pace. After Honda withdrew from Formula One due to the 2008 financial crisis, Brawn elected for experience over youth by retaining Rubens Barrichello.

With no other options available, di Grassi chose to remain in GP2 for another season and signed to drive for Racing Engineering, partnering Dani Clos. He was released from his Renault testing duties after the world governing body of motorsport, the Fédération Internationale de l'Automobile (FIA), prohibited Formula One teams from undertaking in-season testing. However, di Grassi was retained as Renault's reserve driver and was prepared as a potential replacement from Grosjean in the Singapore Grand Prix after Grosjean became ill with food poisoning. He opened the season with two four-place finishes at the duo of Monaco races before clinching his sole victory of the campaign in the Istanbul sprint race from reverse grid pole position. Over the coming rounds, it was noticeable that di Grassi would not be able to clinch the title but came second in the Silverstone feature race. He followed this up with six further podiums throughout the remainder of the season. As in the previous year, di Grassi was third in the drivers' standings.

== Formula One (2010) ==
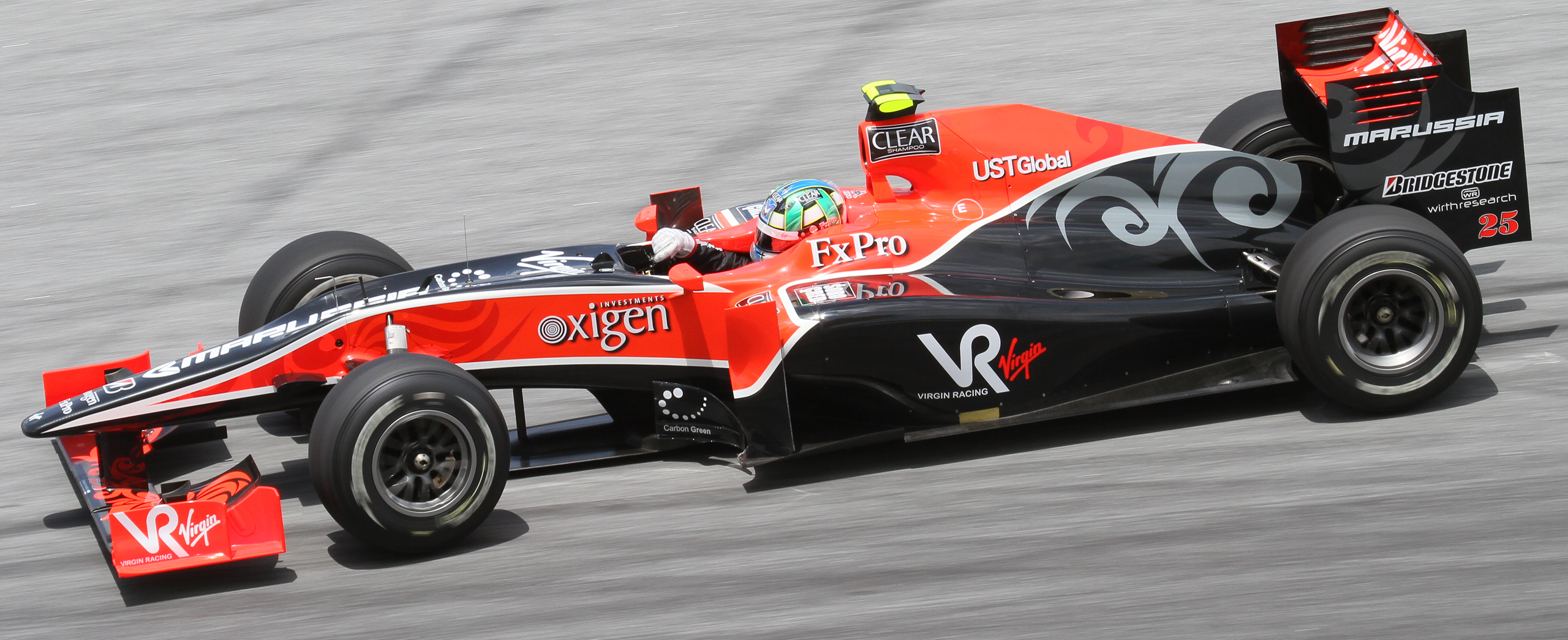
Di Grassi driving for Virgin Racing at the Malaysian Grand Prix where he secured his best finish in Formula One

Di Grassi was announced as one of two drivers of the brand new Virgin Racing team on 15 December 2009 and would be partnered by his former GP2 Series rival Timo Glock in a deal predicted by BBC Radio Sheffield. An important factor in his decision was the chance to work with John Booth, the Virgin team principal. It was reported by The Daily Telegraph that di Grassi had also provided Virgin with £5 million worth of sponsorship. Writing in The Guardian's 2010 Formula One supplement, Alan Henry and Rob Bagchi predicted that Glock would outperform di Grassi throughout the season. He retired from the opening two rounds of the season (Bahrain and Australia) due to hydraulic problems. However his fortunes improved at Sepang where he took his first (and best finish) of the season with a 14th in spite of having to do the second half of the race in fuel conservation mode due to pick-up and fuel capacity problems.

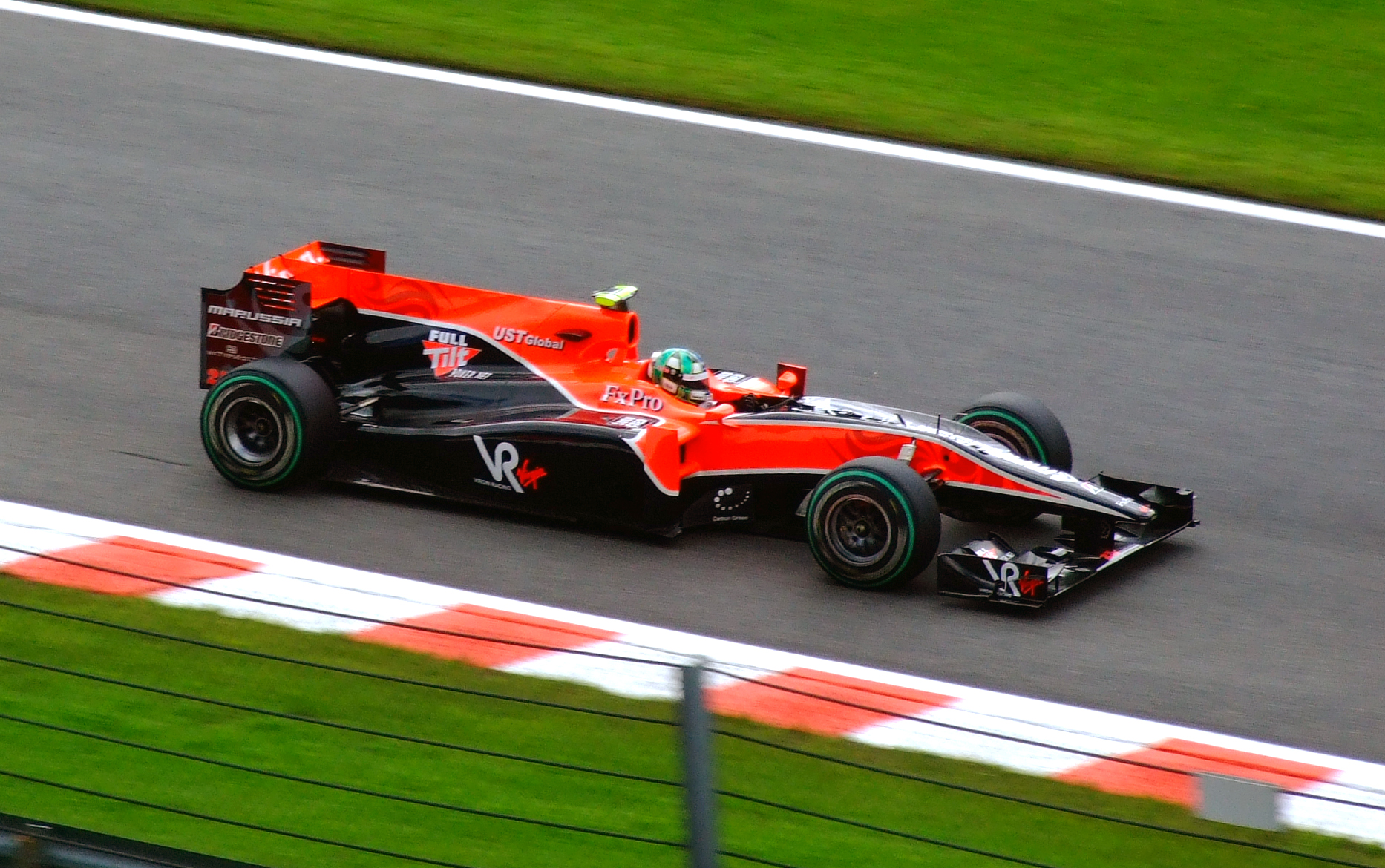
Di Grassi driving for Virgin Racing at the 2010 Belgian Grand Prix

Di Grassi struggled at the Chinese Grand Prix, which had him start from the pit lane. He circulated behind HRT driver Karun Chandhok until he retired with clutch failure after completing nine laps. Further issues arose in Spain as di Grassi battled with car setup and was the last driver to finish the race, and retired early in Monaco due to his right-rear wheel becoming loose at his pit stop. At the Turkish Grand Prix, problems striking multiple Cosworth-engine cars elevated di Grassi to 19th although he had to manage his engine to finish it. Hydraulics issues further afflicted him in Canada but still managed to finish the race and only needed one pit stop to reach the conclusion of the European Grand Prix two weeks later before a further hydraulics issue ended his participation in the British Grand Prix after nine laps.

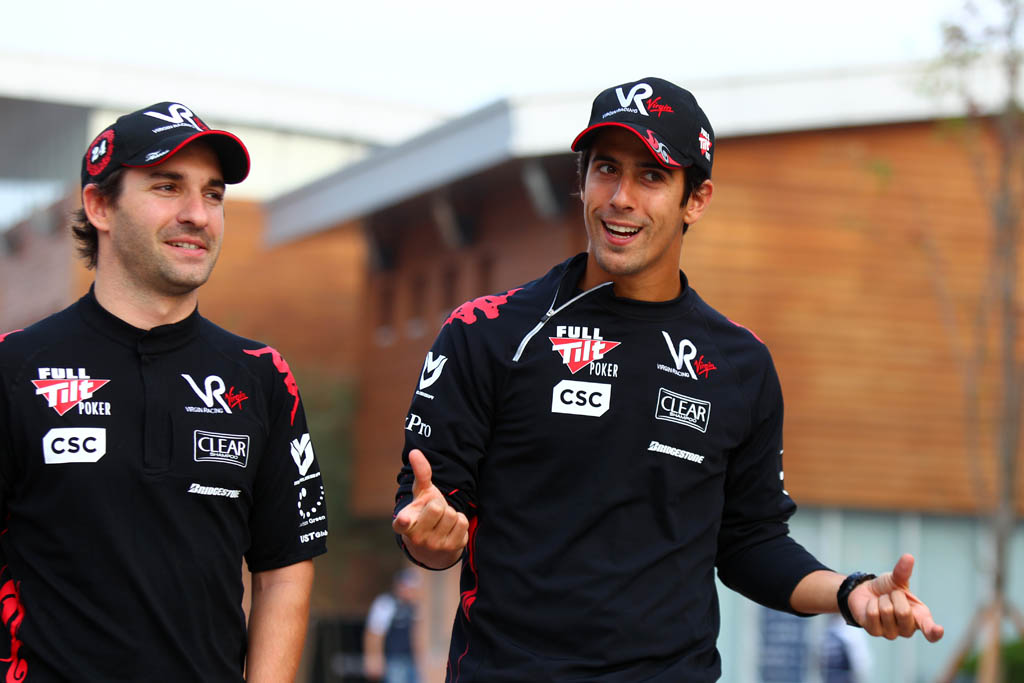
Di Grassi and teammate Timo Glock at the 2010 Korean Grand Prix

A further retirement followed at the Hockenheimring from a damaged rear suspension from hitting a kerb too hard, and had further difficulty at the Hungaroring when he was put a lap down due to a loose wheel but still managed to finish. In variable weather conditions at the Belgian Grand Prix, he battled Lotus's Heikki Kovalainen in the closing ten laps, which ended in the latter's favour by two seconds before another suspension issue ended his Italian Grand Prix with three laps left. Di Grassi had impressed the Virgin Racing engineers with his feedback but Booth had not been satisfied with his pace against Glock and scouted an alternative driver that ended with Booth coming into contact with the Belgian racer Jérôme d'Ambrosio. Di Grassi was the last classified driver in the Singapore Grand Prix, and did not start the Japanese Grand Prix as he crashed on the way to the grid.

At the inaugural Korean Grand Prix, di Grassi lost control of his car while trying to overtake Hispania driver Sakon Yamamoto and crashed into the barriers on the 26th lap. He struggled with further problems with his suspension at his home race in Brazil, and despite his team's mechanics rectifying the issue at his mid-race pit stop, he was not classified in the final results. At the season-ending Abu Dhabi Grand Prix, di Grassi chose to make a pit stop for new tyres during a safety car period and managed them until the end of the race. He ended the season 24th in the Drivers' Championship and scored no points. On 19 December, di Grassi won the Desafio Internacional das Estrelas, a karting event organised by Felipe Massa. Two days later, he was left without a drive, after Virgin announced d'Ambrosio to partner Glock in 2011.

== Pirelli test driver and sports car racing (2011–present) ==
=== 2011–2014 ===
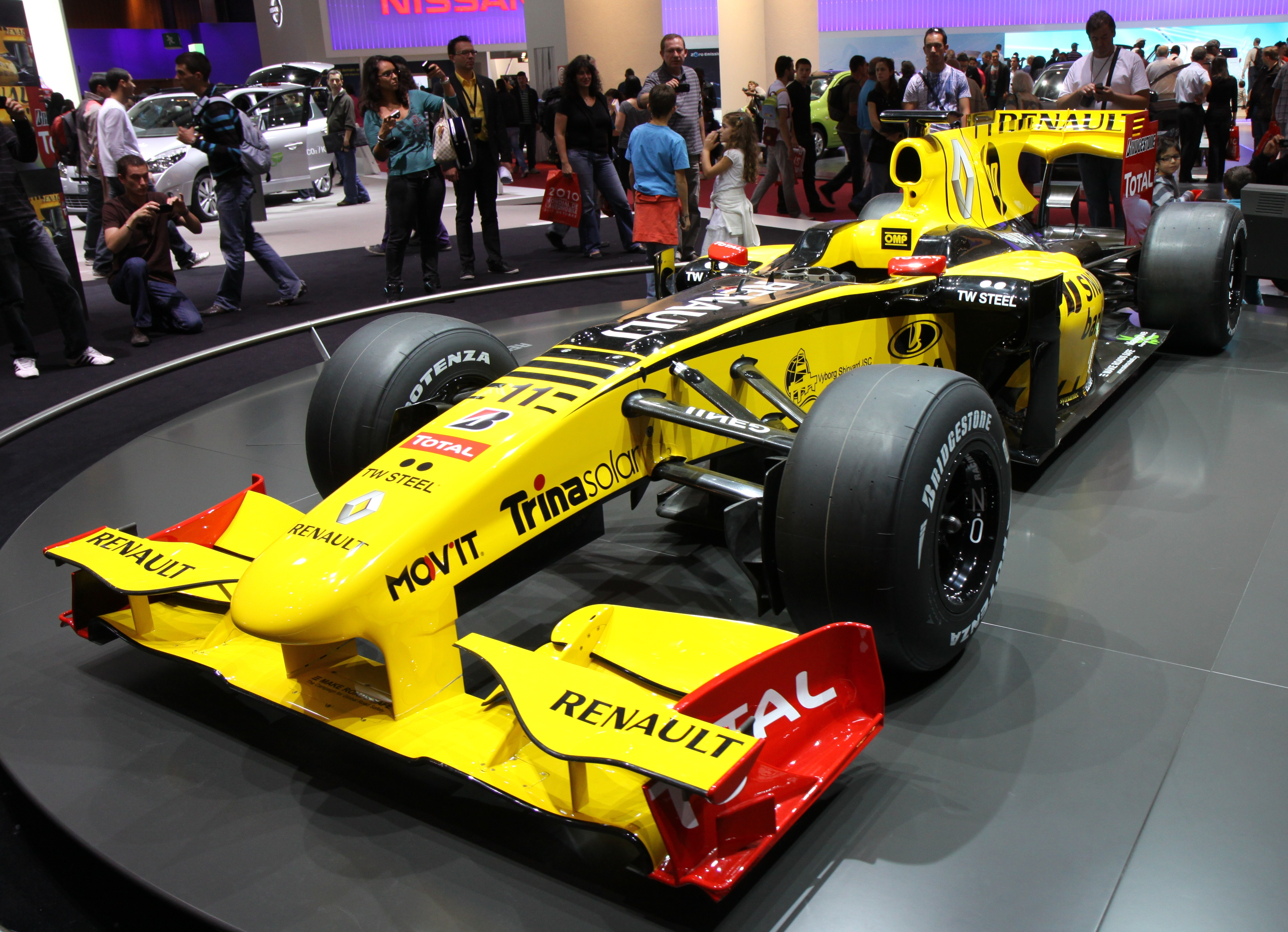
The Renault R30 (pictured in its 2010 configuration) which di Grassi tested in 2012 to develop Pirelli's next generation of tyres in Formula One.

In 2011, di Grassi re-organised his management and sought a Pirelli tyre testing role. This was attained on 6 July and he developed Pirelli's Formula One tyres for the 2011 season, and drove the company's Toyota TF109 test car in five test sessions in order to develop the next generation of tyres, as well as attending several race weekends where he collected information about tyre performance and attended technical briefings. In late 2011, he was among two drivers vying for a seat with Peugeot and tested for the team at the Circuit Paul Ricard and the Ciudad del Motor de Aragón in October. Di Grassi was close to signing a contract with Peugeot but the manufacturer withdrew from sports car racing in January 2012 because of financial difficulties. He remained with Pirelli for the 2012 season alongside the former Toro Rosso driver Jaime Alguersuari to help develop tyres for the 2013 season and beyond using a Renault R30 chassis. The chassis was upgraded to the 2012 requirements for Alguersuari and di Grassi to run the car across four development tests during the course of the season at the Circuito de Jerez, Circuit de Spa-Francorchamps, Autodromo Nazionale Monza and the Circuit de Catalunya to help Pirelli improve its selection of tyres.

Di Grassi made his endurance racing debut at the 2012 24 Hours of Nürburgring, driving the No. 69 Dörr Motorsport McLaren MP4-12C GT3, and was joined by Rudi Adams, Chris Goodwin and Jochen Übler. The quartet retired after eleven laps due to multiple problems. He made his first appearance in the World Endurance Championship (WEC) at the 6 Hours of São Paulo, competing for Audi Sport Team Joest in place of Rinaldo Capello who retired after the 24 Hours of Le Mans. Di Grassi drove the No. 2 Audi R18 e-tron quattro alongside Tom Kristensen and Allan McNish, finishing third overall. Afterwards, he entered the International V8 Supercars Championship for the Armor All Gold Coast 600 round, partnering Michael Patrizi at Tekno Autosports in a Holden VE Commodore, finishing eleventh in the first race, but missed the second after Patrizi heavily damaged the car in qualifying. In November, di Grassi returned to Macau to compete in the GT Cup, driving the AF Corse Ferrari 458 GT3, taking second after battling Edoardo Mortara for the win.

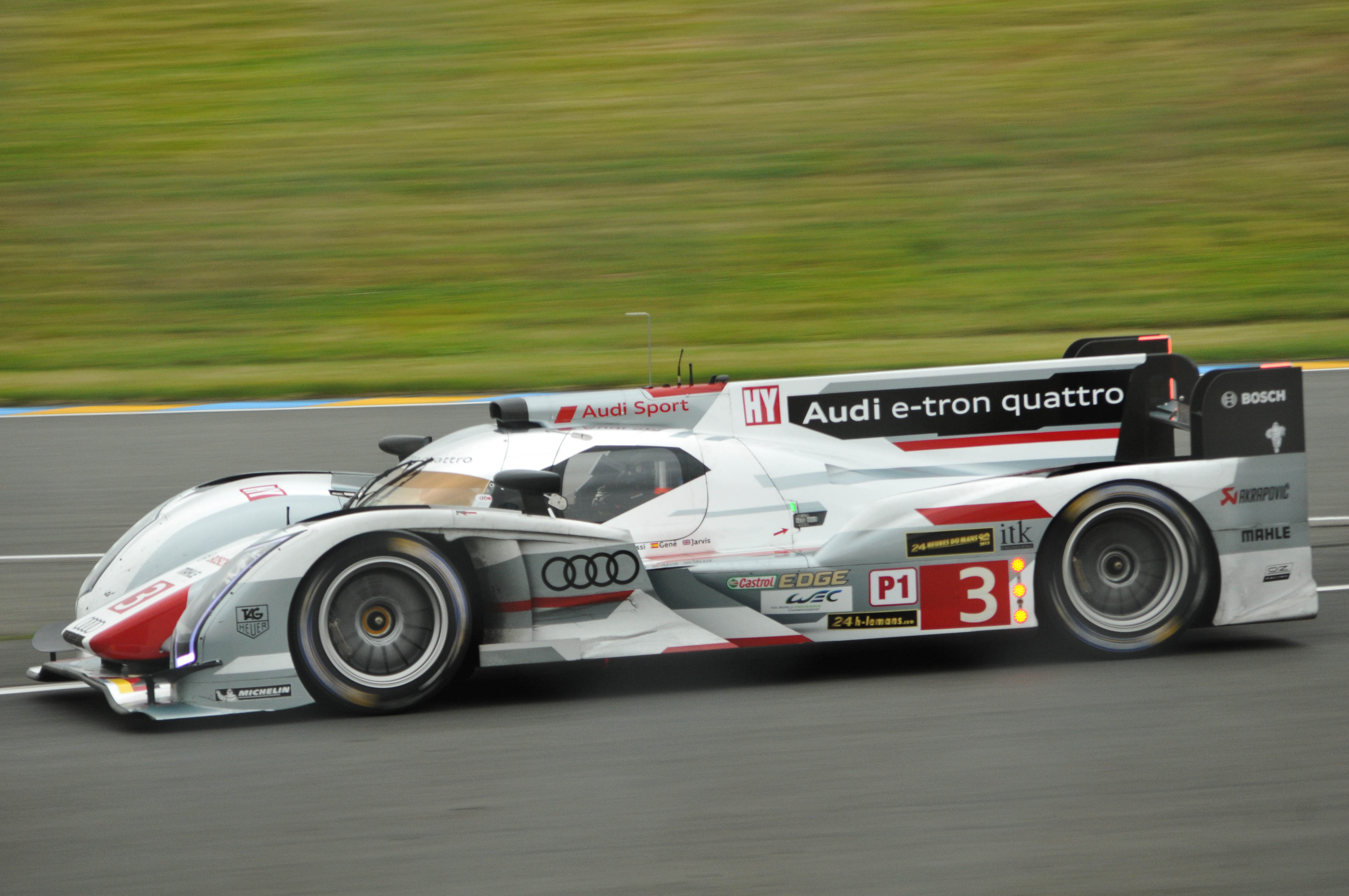
The No. 3 Audi R18 e-tron quattro that di Grassi shared with Oliver Jarvis and Marc Gené at the 2013 24 Hours of Le Mans

Based on his performance in São Paulo, Audi offered di Grassi a contract in late 2012, which he accepted. He replaced Marco Bonanomi, whom Audi released. Audi announced in January 2013 that di Grassi was selected to race for the team in the opening round of the 2013 American Le Mans Series, the 12 Hours of Sebring. He again teamed up with Kristensen and McNish, finishing second overall after exchanging the lead several times with the sister Audi. Shortly after the 6 Hours of Silverstone, Audi announced that di Grassi would be racing an experimental car at the 6 Hours of Spa-Francorchamps and the 24 Hours of Le Mans alongside Oliver Jarvis and Marc Gené. The trio took third place in an Audi clean sweep of the podium. At Le Mans, despite a puncture in the race's opening hours, he, Jarvis and Gené took a second consecutive third-place finish as Kristensen, McNish and Loïc Duval's No. 2 Audi secured the overall victory. Di Grassi, Jarvis and Gené finished ninth in the World Endurance Drivers' Championship. In late August, di Grassi drove the Audi RS5 DTM at a test session, held at the Red Bull Ring.

To start 2014, di Grassi raced the No. 21 RCM Motorsport Chevrolet Sonic alongside Thiago Camilo for the opening round of the Stock Car Brasil season at the Autódromo José Carlos Pace; the duo retired on the first lap due to a clutch failure. Di Grassi was retained by Audi for 2014 and was promoted to a full-time racing seat. He was selected to replace the retired McNish in the No. 1 Audi and shared it with Kristensen and Duval. Di Grassi started the season by retiring due to chassis damage arising from a crash at the 6 Hours of Silverstone, but recovered to finish second overall at Spa-Francorchamps. Although the No. 1 Audi's fuel injectors and turbocharger were replaced, di Grassi, Kristensen and Duval took second at Le Mans three laps adrift of André Lotterer, Benoît Tréluyer and Marcel Fässler's winning car. After another second position at the Circuit of the Americas, he clinched a hat-trick of fifth-places before ending with a podium at the season-closing 6 Hours of São Paulo. The trio's results ranked them ninth in the drivers' standings with 117 points.

=== 2015–present ===
As in the previous year, di Grassi took part in the season-opening round of the Stock Car Brasil in the No. 21 RCM Motorsport Chevrolet Sonic that he shared with Thiago Camilo but this time at the Autódromo Internacional Ayrton Senna and the two finished fifth. He remained with Audi for the upcoming season and was paired with Oliver Jarvis and Loïc Duval in the No. 8 car. He began the year with a fifth-place at Silverstone followed by a seventh at Spa-Francorchamps. Le Mans was different for the trio as Duval crashed heavily in the third hour and this ended their chances of winning the race but were able to settle for fourth overall. The trio took fourth at the inaugural 6 Hours of Nürburgring, and followed this up by securing their first (and only) podium of the season at the 6 Hours of Circuit of the Americas in third position despite serving a one-minute stop-and-go penalty for a pit lane infringement. After that, he took two back-to-back fourth-place finishes in Fuji and Shanghai and rounded out the season with a fifth at Bahrain. Di Grassi's results for the season placed him fourth in the Drivers' Championship and accumulated 99 points.

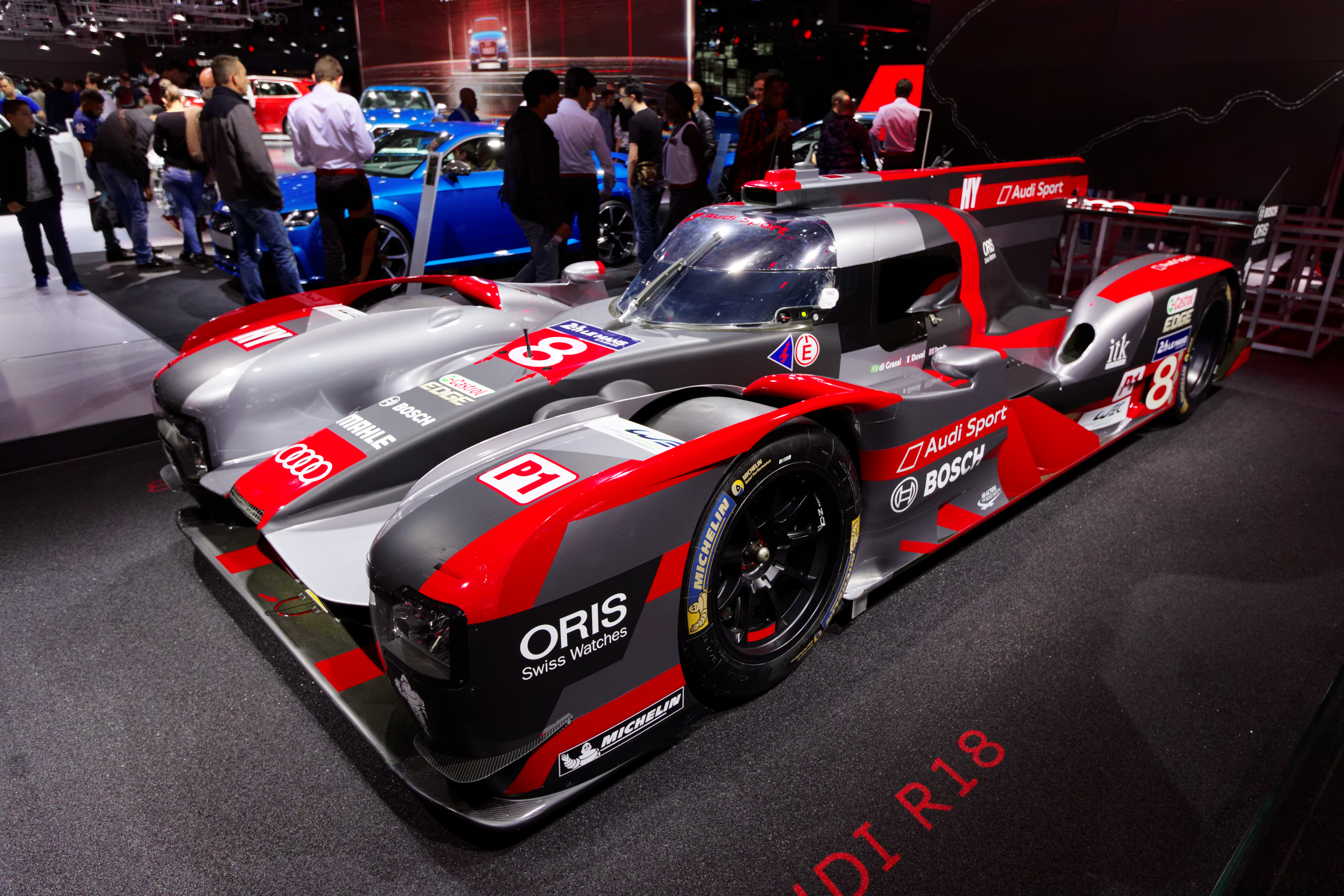
The Audi R18 (pictured at the 2016 Paris Motor Show) that di Grassi, Duval and Oliver Jarvis drove in the 2016 World Endurance Championship

For the third consecutive year, di Grassi shared the No. 21 RCM Motorsport Chevrolet Sonic with Thiago Camilo in the season-opening Stock Car Brasil round, which in 2016 was held at the Autódromo Internacional de Curitiba; the duo came fourteenth. Di Grassi's WEC campaign started badly when his car's hybrid system failed at the season-opening 6 Hours of Silverstone, but recovered to take advantage of problems striking the LMP1 field to secure his first outright victory in the series at Spa-Francorchamps. Variable weather conditions were dealt with at Le Mans but the trio spent thirty-nine minutes in the pit lane to replace brakes and settled for third overall after the No. 5 Toyota TS050 Hybrid was not classified for failing to complete the final lap. On Audi's orders, di Grassi took part in the Norisring round of the Audi Sport TT Cup as a guest driver, finishing second in the first race and won the second.

The trio matched Porsche for pace at the 6 Hours of Nürburgring and ended the duel in second, but a wheel bearing failure in Mexico City put the car out of contention. At the 6 Hours of Circuit of the Americas two weeks later the trio led before electrical failure cost them fifty seconds but the switch to di Grassi had him push hard for second overall. Another strong performance came at Fuji where the car led for the majority of the race until the No. 6 Toyota of Kamui Kobayashi took over first place and held onto it despite the trio's advances. Di Grassi took the lead at Shanghai but a refuelling rig issue lost him time, meaning he could only manage fifth. He, Jarvis and Duval dominated the 6 Hours of Bahrain to win Audi's final World Endurance Championship race, and their efforts throughout the season earned them second in the drivers' standings with 147.5 points.

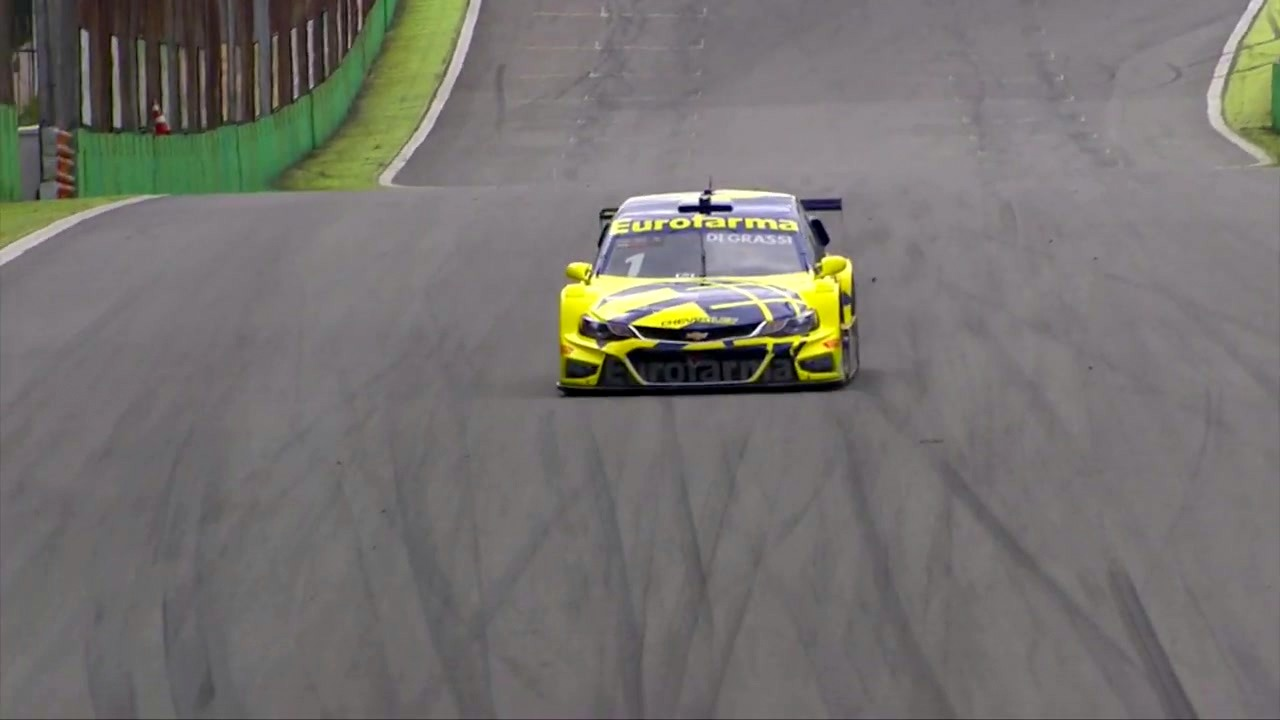
Di Grassi competing at The Million Race during the 2019 Stock Car Brasil Championship as a wildcard.

Di Grassi was offered a contract to race for Toyota at the 2017 6 Hours of Spa-Francorchamps and the 24 Hours of Le Mans but he was not granted clearance by Audi to race in LMP1. He was later slated to co-drive the No. 51 AF Corse Ferrari 488 GTE at Le Mans but was ruled out due to an ankle injury he sustained in a football match. In October 2017, di Grassi was announced as one of sixteen drivers selected to participate in the Audi Sport TT Cup series-ending Race of Legends at the Hockenheimring. He finished in second after battling with Frank Stippler for the victory in the race's final laps. The following month, di Grassi returned to Macau for the first time in five years to compete in the FIA GT World Cup in an Audi R8 LMS fielded by HCB-Rutronik Racing. He was involved in a multi-car pile up in the first lap of the qualifying race, but was cleared by doctors for the following day's main race. Di Grassi retired following an accident on the sixth lap. He joined Mazda Team Joest in its No. 77 Mazda DPi for the 2018 WeatherTech SportsCar Championship season-ending Petit Le Mans alongside Oliver Jarvis and Tristan Nunez in October 2018.

Di Grassi made a one-off return to the Stock Car Brasil Championship in 2019 as a wildcard for The Million Race. He took pole position for the race and won from his teammate, Ricardo Maurício, but his pass was considered illegal, and he was given a drive-through penalty. Di Grassi failed to serve it within three laps and was disqualified from the result. He later complained that his team were not told that he could have given the place back and avoided a penalty.

== Formula E (2012–2026) ==
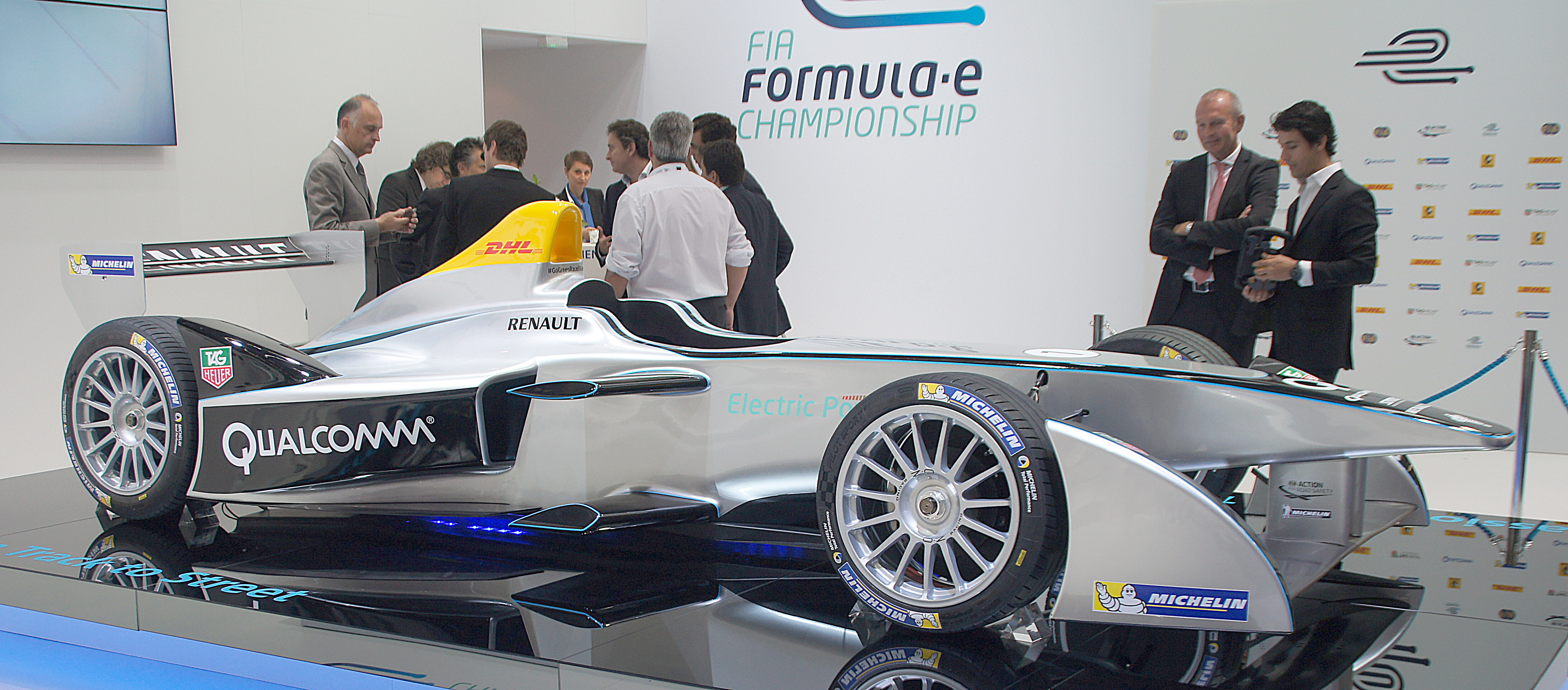
Di Grassi (rightmost, holding the steering wheel) and Formula E CEO Alejandro Agag (sixth person from left) unveiling the Spark-Renault SRT 01E

Formula E promoter Alejandro Agag sought di Grassi's technological expertise as a driver to develop the series' electric race car. He was initially dubious as he was not convinced that electric car racing would be exciting but reconsidered after hearing its socially-oriented goal to develop attractive environmentally friendly vehicles. A year later, di Grassi was announced as the official test driver for Formula E. He first tested the prototype Formula E car, called Formulec, at Circuit de L'Eure near Paris in August 2012, and was heavily involved in the development of the vehicle. Di Grassi later terminated his contract as test driver to race in the series. On 13 February 2014, di Grassi was announced to be competing in the inaugural Formula E season with Audi Sport ABT alongside his campaign in the World Endurance Championship. His teammate was the former GP2 driver Daniel Abt.

=== ABT Sportsline (2014–2021) ===
==== 2014–15 season ====
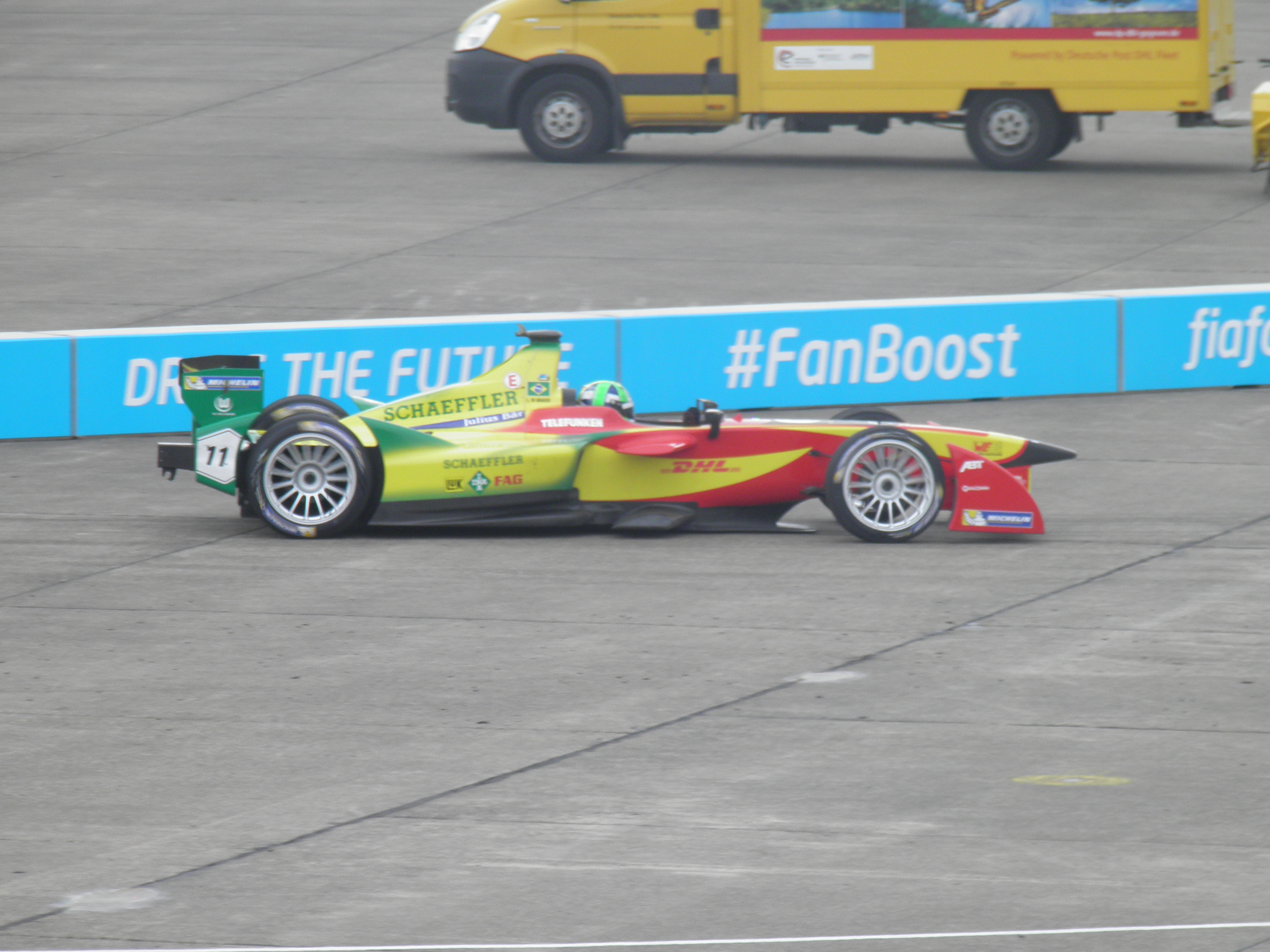
Di Grassi at the 2015 Berlin ePrix where he was disqualified for running a non-standardised front wing.

In September 2014, di Grassi won the first race of the season in Beijing, the first driver to win an all-electric motor race. He recorded two more consecutive podiums in Putrajaya with a second-place finish, and in Punta del Este with third place to give him the lead in the championship. However, di Grassi had bad luck with a suspension failure in Buenos Aires, causing him to retire from the lead, and technical issues caused him to finish ninth in Miami, to lose the championship lead. He bounced back by finishing in third position at Long Beach, and second place in Monaco to give himself a four-point lead with four rounds to go. Di Grassi's championship took a blow when he was disqualified from victory due to illegal modifications to his front wing endplates in Berlin; with second place in Moscow to Nelson Piquet Jr., di Grassi entered the season-ending double-header in London seventeen points in arrears. He finished fourth and sixth in the two races in London, one place ahead of Piquet each time. As a result, he finished eleven points behind Piquet and lost second to Sébastien Buemi, who won the first race. Di Grassi, however, managed the most podium finishes of any driver with six.

==== 2015–16 season ====
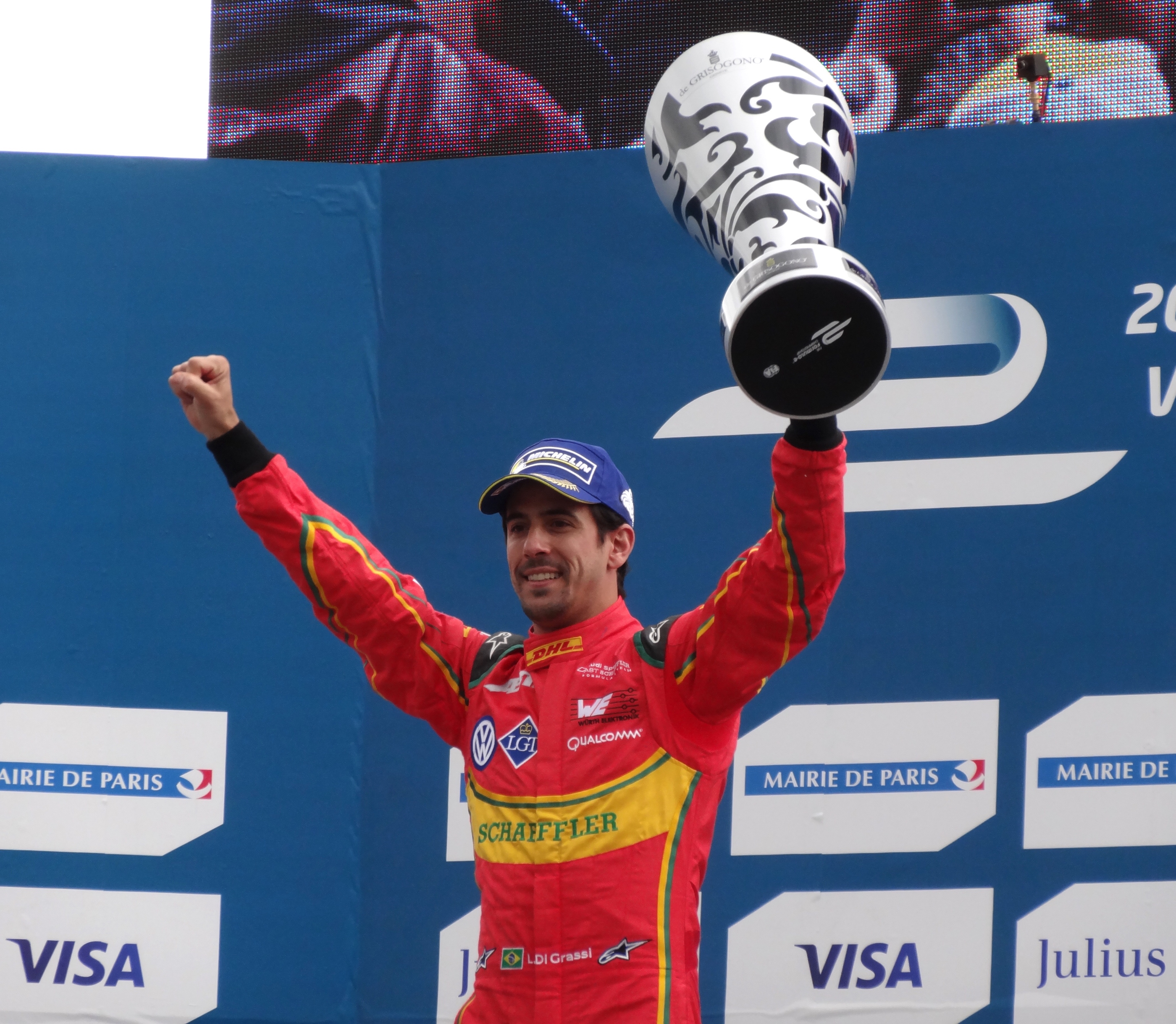
Di Grassi celebrating his victory in the 2016 Paris ePrix

For the second consecutive season, he achieved three podium finishes in the opening three races. Di Grassi started the season with second place in Beijing and then followed this up with victory in Putrajaya and took the championship lead. He followed up his win with second place in Punta del Este behind Buemi, and third place in Buenos Aires also behind Buemi, meaning he was four points behind after four races.

Di Grassi's title hopes took a brief blow after being disqualified from the win at the Mexico City ePrix after his car was found to be below the minimum weight limit. He bounced back with a victory at Long Beach, while points leader Buemi had a mistake-filled race, where he collided into the back of Robin Frijns, had to switch cars early and ultimately finished sixteenth and took two points for fastest lap. Now with a one-point advantage in the championship, he then followed this up with another victory in Paris whereas Buemi finished in third to give him an eleven-point lead heading into Berlin. The scenario was reversed in Berlin, as Buemi took victory and di Grassi finishing third after teammate Abt refused team orders to let him through in the final laps.

Di Grassi extended his championship lead to three after the first London ePrix race, finishing fourth to Buemi's fifth, but Buemi stated his rival was "willing to crash" after their battle during the race. Buemi eradicated that advantage with pole position for the season's final race, while di Grassi qualified third behind Buemi's team-mate Nico Prost. On the opening lap, di Grassi and Prost went side by side through the opening bends and under braking for turn three, di Grassi made slight contact with Prost and ran into the back of Buemi. Both cars sustained damage in the collision; Buemi's rear wing was dislodged, while di Grassi's front wing was removed, as well as damage to the front-right suspension. With the drivers down the order, and two points available for the race's fastest lap, di Grassi and Buemi used their second cars to commence a battle to set the fastest lap time while not getting held up by other drivers. Di Grassi initially set the best time, before Buemi improved upon that, and ultimately took the championship title by five tenths on track, and two points in the championship.

==== 2016–17 season ====
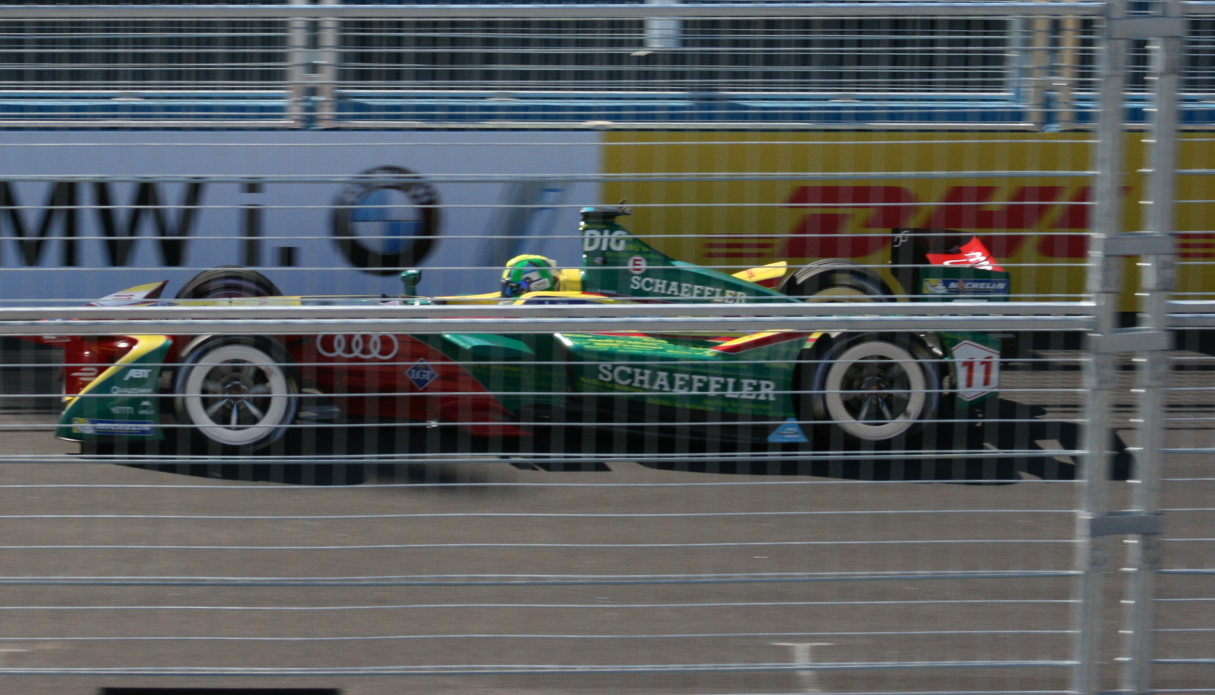
Di Grassi competing in the 2017 New York City ePrix

During the off-season, di Grassi became the first person to drive an electric car on the Arctic polar ice cap in an area of Northern Greenland and produced a video clip that promotes awareness of global warming. He opened the first three races of the 2016-17 season with a second place at the inaugural Hong Kong ePrix and followed this up with a fifth position in Marrakesh and clinched another podium in the Buenos Aires round with a third-place finish. After being involved in a first lap accident which necessitated a change of rear wing at the Mexico City race, di Grassi then made the switch into his second car which meant he would have to conserve electrical energy towards the race's end. However, circumstances, including a safety car, meant he held onto the lead to clinch his first victory of the season and was now five points in arrears of Buemi. A month later in Monaco, he launched an attack on Buemi for the win in the closing stages of the ePrix but was unable to get ahead and took second place.

Di Grassi, however, struggled in the Paris ePrix as he made contact with the Andretti car of António Félix da Costa and later crashed out. His performance at the first double header of the season at Berlin reduced Buemi's championship lead from a season-high forty-three points to thirty-two. Di Grassi then accumulated a further twenty-two points at the July New York City ePrix to be ten points behind Buemi (who missed the race due to a World Endurance Championship commitment at the Nürburgring) heading into the season-closing double header in Montreal two weeks later. He clinched the pole position for the first ePrix which he won and came seventh in the second. In addition, di Grassi took advantage of Buemi performing poorly in both races to win his first Drivers' Championship. He was named CEO of Roborace on 13 September having served as an adviser since 2016. Di Grassi was one of six drivers shortlisted for the 2017 Autosport International Racing Driver Award. On 6 December, di Grassi was voted the Brazilian Driver of the Year by readers of Grande Prêmio.

==== 2017–18 season ====
Di Grassi continued with Audi Sport ABT for the 2017–18 Formula E season. He had a poor start to his campaign, scoring no points in the first four races due to multiple problems relating to his car's powertrain, but took his first top-ten finish of the season at the Mexico City round, coming ninth. Thereafter, he took seven consecutive podium finishes which included successive victories in the Zürich ePrix and the first New York City race. Di Grassi finished second in the Drivers' Championship with 144 points and his and teammate Abt's form throughout the season helped Audi win their first Teams' Championship from Techeetah. After the season, he said to Autosport that he believed his standard of driving had improved from the previous season and called his comeback " a miracle", "The difficult part was not to get that mental spiral that you doubt yourself or anything during these first four or five races. I think I drove better this year than I drove last year because I didn't do any mistakes".

==== 2018–19 season ====
Di Grassi won the 2019 Mexico City ePrix by overtaking Pascal Wehrlein a few meters before the chequered flag. He also won in Berlin later that year and would end the season third overall in the standings with 108 points.

==== 2019–20 season ====
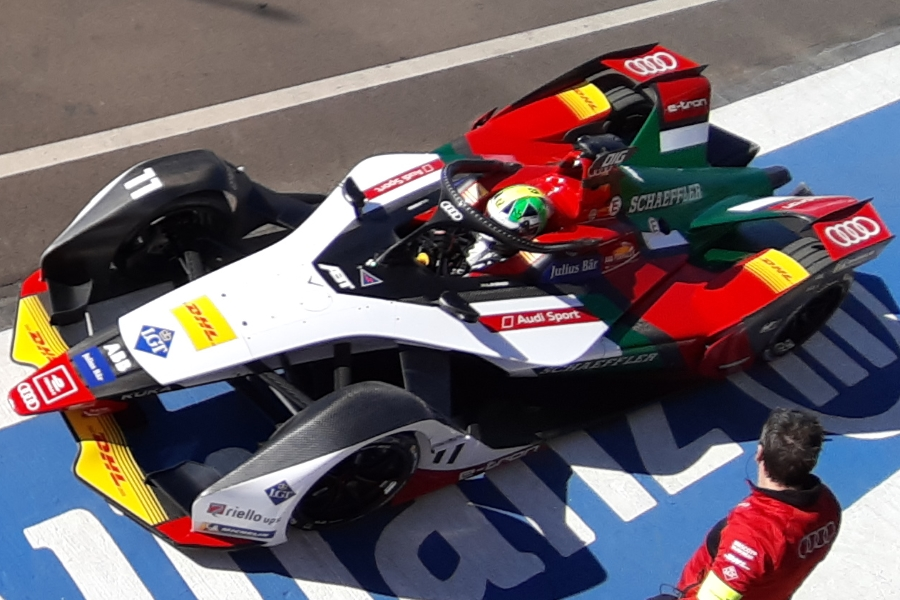
di Grassi at the 2019 Marrakesh ePrix

Di Grassi scored his first podium of the 2019-20 season in Diriyah. He finished sixth in the championship table with 77 points, despite this year being di Grassi's first Formula E season in which he did not manage to win a single race.

==== 2020–21 season ====
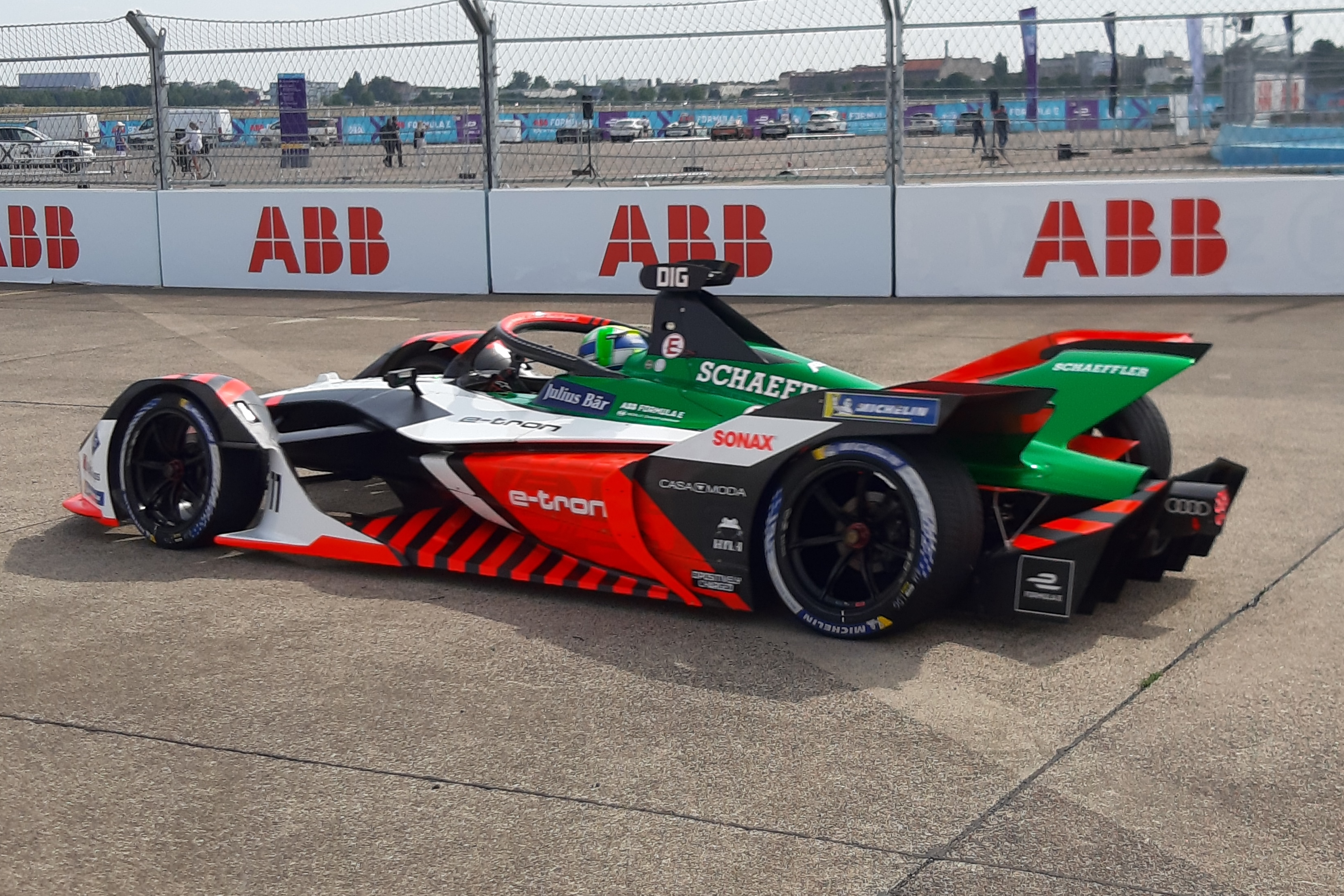
di Grassi during the 2021 Berlin ePrix

Di Grassi won the first Puebla ePrix after Pascal Wehrlein was disqualified for failing to declare his tyres. Di Grassi was leading the first race in Rome before his car failed with 5 minutes left. He also failed to finish the second race the next day. Di Grassi won the first Puebla ePrix after Pascal Wehrlein was disqualified for failing to declare his tyres. In the second race in London, Di Grassi was eighth when the safety car was deployed, and felt the safety car was too slow. Di Grassi went through the pit lane and emerged in first; however had not come to a complete stop in his pit, and was given a drive-through penalty. Audi did not tell him, and as a result, was disqualified for not serving the penalty. Di Grassi finished the season in seventh, tied on 87 points but behind Sam Bird.

Di Grassi ran two double rounds of Deutsche Tourenwagen Masters, with 12th as his best finish.

=== ROKIT Venturi Racing (2022) ===
==== 2021–22 season ====
Di Grassi moved to Venturi Racing for season 8 after Audi quit the championship. He started the season strong with a fifth and third place however then scored no points for the next two races and failed to finish in the first race in Berlin, which left him with 37 points from seven races. In New York, di Grassi took a second place and then was outside of the points in 11th when he had contact with one minute left on the clock, resulting in a DNF. Di Grassi lined up second in race 2 in London and took the win. A third place in Seoul race 1 meant di Grassi now had 1009 points in Formula E. He ended the season in fifth with 126 points.

=== Mahindra Racing (2023) ===
==== 2022–23 season ====
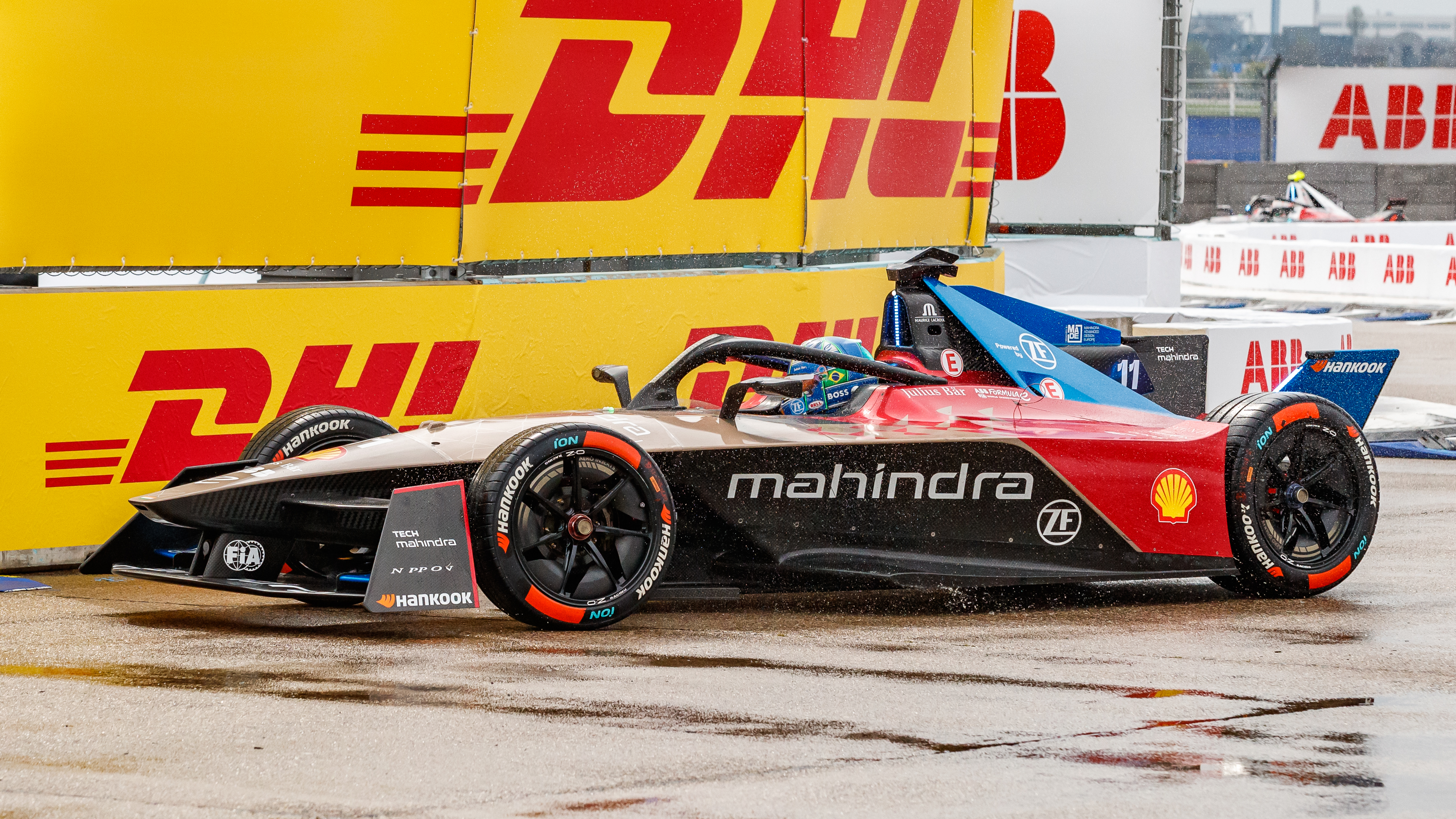
di Grassi with Mahindra during the 2023 Berlin ePrix

Di Grassi moved to Mahindra Racing for the 2022–23 season, replacing the outgoing Alexander Sims. At the season opening Mexico City ePrix, he qualified on pole and finished third, which he described as "like a Mexican miracle". After scoring eighteen points at the first ePrix, he only scored fourteen more in the rest of the year. Di Grassi left the team following the conclusion of the season.

=== Return to ABT (2024–2026) ===
==== 2023–24 season ====
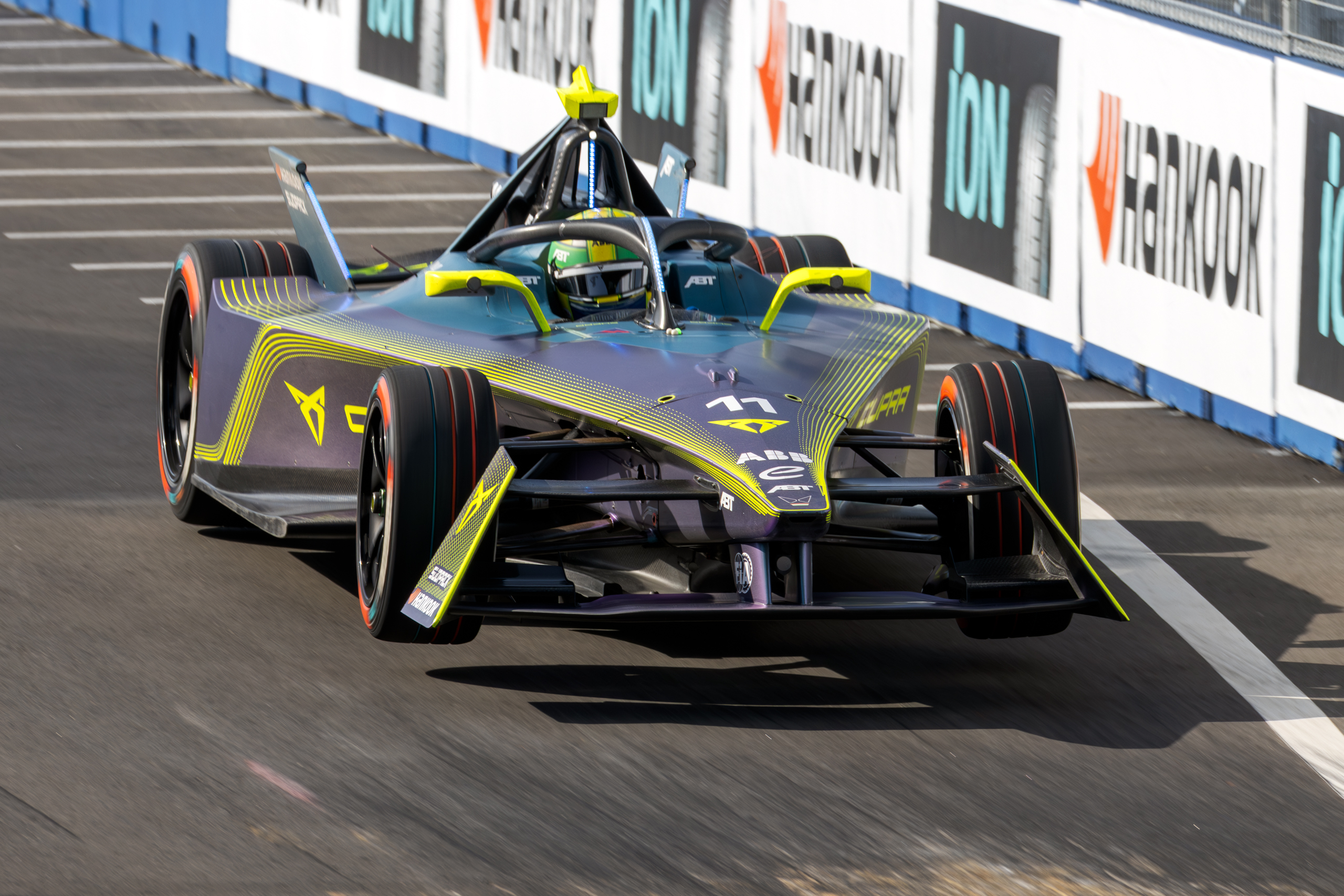
di Grassi at the 2024 Tokyo ePrix

Di Grassi reunited with ABT CUPRA for the 2023–24 season, partnering Nico Müller. Di Grassi had an awful season while Müller scored 52 points and finished 12th in the standings, di Grassi finished 23rd with four points, even being beaten by substitute driver Taylor Barnard.

==== 2024–25 season ====
Di Grassi continued with ABT for the 2024–25 season, as the team switches to Lola powertrains, and he teamed up with Formula 2 graduate Zane Maloney. Di Grassi had a good season with a return to the podium for the first time since the 2023 Mexico City ePrix at the Miami ePrix finishing second to Pascal Wehrlein. Di Grassi finished 17th in the drivers' standings, beating Maloney, who was the only pointless driver of the season, thus finishing 24th.

==== 2025–26 season ====
Di Grassi was retained by ABT for a third campaign with the team during the 2025–26 season, alongside Zane Maloney once more. Ahead of the Berlin ePrix, Di Grassi announced his retirement from Formula E and professional racing.

== Driver profile and views ==
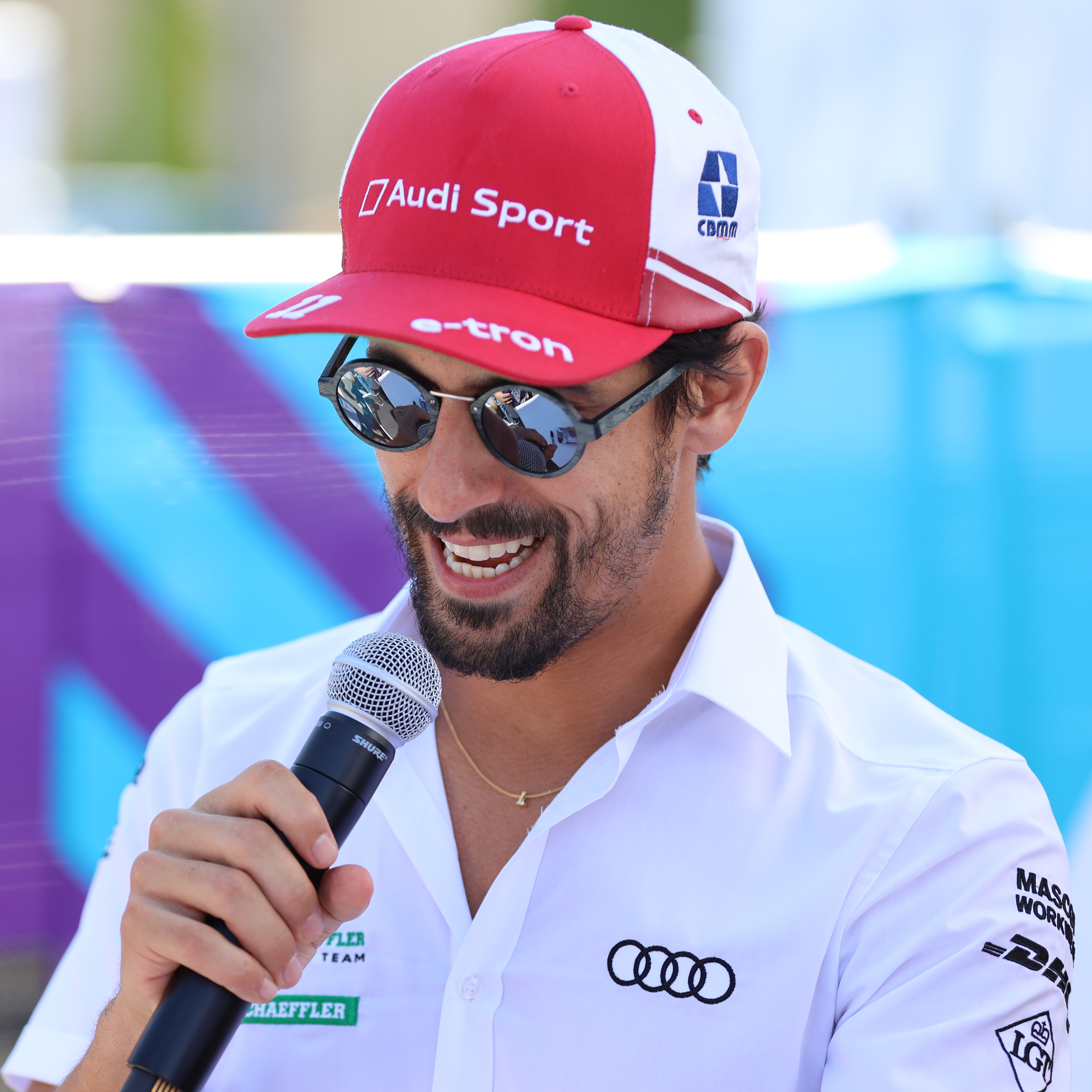
Di Grassi talks with fans at an Audi eTron event during the FIA Formula E 2019 New York E-Prix

Di Grassi is regarded by some as one of the world's most "technically gifted" racing drivers due to his development of the Dallara GP2/08 and Spark-Renault SRT 01E chassis. He is known as a controlled individual who has a shrewd understanding on dealing with the press. William Briety of The Checkered Flag wrote that di Grassi is "unquestionably a new breed of racing driver" as he is supposedly more at ease over the future of motor racing than his contemporaries, and believes that automated racing has the potential to relieve Formula One from any obligation it has to have any sort of relevance to the road cars of today and thus make the driver the focus of attention. The Independent journalist Samuel Lovett described di Grassi as "a vibrant, forceful personality" who brings "colour and intrigue to a world dominated by Kubrick-esque machines, big data and space-age technology."

Di Grassi has criticised the overall design of the Halo cockpit protection device in Formula One and track limits. He favours altering track layouts after noticing how this has led to a lack of overtaking opportunities in some categories of motor racing. Discussing these issues have led to several racing pundits to suggest that di Grassi should consider becoming more actively involved in the future of motor racing's and has spoken of his desire to run for the presidency of the FIA in the future.

Di Grassi said that he voted for Brazilian president Jair Bolsonaro, but has later criticized both Bolsonaro and his successor Luiz Inácio Lula da Silva.

== Racing record ==
=== Career summary ===
| Season | Series | Team | Races | Wins | Poles | F/laps | Podiums | Points | Position |
|---|---|---|---|---|---|---|---|---|---|
| 2002 | Formula Renault 2.0 Brazil | G Force Motorsport | 10 | 2 | 1 | 0 | 6 | 137 | 2nd |
| 2003 | Formula 3 Sudamericana | Avallone Motorsport | 12 | 1 | 3 | 0 | 11 | 164 | 2nd |
| 2003 | Formula 3 Euro Series | Prema Powerteam | 4 | 0 | 0 | 0 | 0 | 5 | 21st |
| 2004 | British Formula 3 International Series | Hitech Racing | 24 | 2 | 3 | 0 | 6 | 130 | 8th |
| 2004 | Bahrain Superprix | Hitech Racing | 1 | 0 | 0 | 0 | 0 | N/A | 19th |
| 2004 | Macau Grand Prix | Hitech Racing | 1 | 0 | 0 | 0 | 1 | N/A | 3rd |
| 2004 | Masters of Formula 3 | Hitech Racing | 1 | 0 | 0 | 0 | 0 | N/A | 5th |
| 2004 | FIA European Formula Three Cup | Hitech Racing | 1 | 0 | 0 | 0 | 0 | N/A | 6th |
| 2005 | Formula 3 Euro Series | Manor Motorsport | 19 | 1 | 2 | 1 | 6 | 68 | 3rd |
| 2005 | Macau Grand Prix | Manor Motorsport | 1 | 1 | 0 | 0 | 1 | N/A | 1st |
| 2005 | Masters of Formula 3 | Manor Motorsport | 1 | 0 | 0 | 0 | 1 | N/A | 3rd |
| 2006 | GP2 Series | Durango | 20 | 0 | 0 | 0 | 0 | 8 | 17th |
| 2007 | GP2 Series | ART Grand Prix | 21 | 1 | 0 | 0 | 7 | 77 | 2nd |
| 2008 | GP2 Series | Barwa International Campos Team | 14 | 3 | 0 | 2 | 6 | 63 | 3rd |
| 2009 | GP2 Series | Racing Engineering | 20 | 1 | 1 | 2 | 8 | 63 | 3rd |
| 2010 | Formula One | Virgin Racing | 19 | 0 | 0 | 0 | 0 | 0 | 24th |
| 2011 | Formula One | Pirelli | Test driver | | | | | | |
| 2012 | FIA World Endurance Championship | Audi Sport Team Joest | 1 | 0 | 0 | 1 | 1 | 15 | 22nd |
| 2012 | City of Dreams Macau GT Cup | AF Corse | 1 | 0 | 0 | 0 | 0 | N/A | 17th |
| 2012 | 24 Hours of Nürburgring - SP9 | Dörr Motorsport | 1 | 0 | 0 | 0 | 0 | N/A | NC |
| 2012 | International V8 Supercars Championship | Tekno Autosports | 2 | 0 | 0 | 0 | 0 | 0 | NC† |
| 2012 | Formula One | Pirelli | Test driver | | | | | | |
| 2013 | FIA World Endurance Championship | Audi Sport Team Joest | 2 | 0 | 0 | 0 | 2 | 45 | 9th |
| 2013 | 24 Hours of Le Mans | Audi Sport Team Joest | 1 | 0 | 0 | 0 | 1 | N/A | 3rd |
| 2013 | American Le Mans Series | Audi Sport Team Joest | 1 | 0 | 0 | 0 | 1 | 0 | NC† |
| 2013 | Formula One | Pirelli | Test driver | | | | | | |
| 2014 | FIA World Endurance Championship | Audi Sport Team Joest | 8 | 0 | 0 | 0 | 4 | 117 | 4th |
| 2014 | 24 Hours of Le Mans | Audi Sport Team Joest | 1 | 0 | 0 | 0 | 1 | N/A | **2nd** |
| 2014 | Stock Car Brasil | Ipiranga-RCM | 1 | 0 | 0 | 0 | 0 | 0 | NC† |
| 2014–15 | Formula E | Audi Sport ABT | 11 | 1 | 0 | 1 | 6 | 133 | 3rd |
| 2015 | FIA World Endurance Championship | Audi Sport Team Joest | 8 | 0 | 0 | 0 | 1 | 99 | 4th |
| 2015 | 24 Hours of Le Mans | Audi Sport Team Joest | 1 | 0 | 0 | 0 | 0 | N/A | 4th |
| 2015 | Stock Car Brasil | Ipiranga-RCM | 1 | 0 | 0 | 0 | 0 | 0 | NC† |
| 2015–16 | Formula E | ABT Schaeffler Audi Sport | 10 | 3 | 0 | 0 | 7 | 153 | 2nd |
| 2016 | FIA World Endurance Championship | Audi Sport Team Joest | 9 | 2 | 3 | 1 | 6 | 147.5 | **2nd** |
| 2016 | 24 Hours of Le Mans | Audi Sport Team Joest | 1 | 0 | 0 | 0 | 1 | N/A | 3rd |
| 2016 | Audi Sport TT Cup | Audi Sport | 2 | 1 | 0 | 2 | 2 | 0 | NC† |
| 2016 | Stock Car Brasil | Ipiranga-RCM | 1 | 0 | 0 | 1 | 0 | 0 | NC† |
| 2016–17 | Formula E | ABT Schaeffler Audi Sport | 12 | 2 | 3 | 0 | 7 | 181 | **1st** |
| 2017 | FIA GT World Cup | HCB-Rutronik-Racing | 1 | 0 | 0 | 0 | 0 | N/A | DNF |
| 2017–18 | Formula E | Audi Sport ABT Schaeffler | 12 | 2 | 0 | 3 | 7 | 144 | **2nd** |
| 2018 | Stock Car Brasil | HERO Motorsport | 16 | 3 | 0 | 1 | 3 | 127 | 12th |
| 2018 | Petit Le Mans | Mazda Team Joest | 1 | 0 | 0 | 0 | 1 | | 2nd |
| 2018–19 | Formula E | Audi Sport ABT Schaeffler | 13 | 2 | 0 | 2 | 3 | 108 | **3rd** |
| 2019 | Stock Car Brasil | Eurofarma RC | 1 | 0 | 1 | 0 | 0 | 0 | 34th |
| 2019–20 | Formula E | Audi Sport ABT Schaeffler | 11 | 0 | 0 | 1 | 2 | 77 | 6th |
| 2020 | Porsche Endurance Series | N/A | 2 | 0 | 0 | 0 | 2 | 159 | 6th |
| 2020–21 | Formula E | Audi Sport ABT Schaeffler | 15 | 2 | 0 | 1 | 3 | 87 | 7th |
| 2021 | Deutsche Tourenwagen Masters | Abt Sportsline | 4 | 0 | 0 | 0 | 0 | 0 | NC† |
| 2021 | Porsche All-Star Race Brasil | N/A | 1 | 0 | 0 | 0 | 0 | N/A | 13th |
| 2021–22 | Formula E | ROKiT Venturi Racing | 16 | 1 | 0 | 4 | 4 | 126 | 5th |
| 2022–23 | Formula E | Mahindra Racing | 15 | 0 | 1 | 0 | 1 | 32 | 15th |
| 2023–24 | Formula E | ABT CUPRA Formula E Team | 16 | 0 | 0 | 0 | 0 | 4 | 23rd |
| 2024–25 | Formula E | Lola Yamaha ABT Formula E Team | 16 | 0 | 0 | 0 | 1 | 32 | 17th |
| 2025–26 | Formula E | Lola Yamaha ABT Formula E Team | 13 | 1 | 0 | 0 | 1 | 32* | 15th* |
| 2026 | Porsche Carrera Cup Brasil | | | | | | | | |
| 2026 | Stock Car Pro Series | RCM Motorsport | 1 | 1 | 0 | 0 | 1 | 80 | 33rd* |

^{†} As di Grassi was a guest driver, he was ineligible for championship points.

=== Complete Formula Three Sudamericana results ===
(key) (Races in bold indicate pole position) (Races in italics indicate fastest lap)

| Year | Entrant | Chassis | Engine | 1 | 2 | 3 | 4 | 5 | 6 | 7 | 8 | 9 | 10 | 11 | 12 | 13 | 14 | 15 | 16 | 17 | 18 | DC | Points |
|---|---|---|---|---|---|---|---|---|---|---|---|---|---|---|---|---|---|---|---|---|---|---|---|
| 2003 | Avallone Motorsport | Dallara F301 | Mugen-Honda | CAM; 1; 3 | CAM; 2; 2 | **RDJ**; **1**; 3 | RDJ; 2; 2 | PAR; 1; 2 | PAR; 2; 2 | INT; 1; 2 | INT; 2; 2 | **OBE**; **1**; 1 | **OBE**; **2**; 2 | CUR; 1 Ret | CUR; 2; 2 | LON; 1 | LON; 2 | CAS; 1 | CAS; 2 | BRA; 1 | BRA; 2 | 2nd | 164 |

=== Complete Formula 3 Euro Series results ===
(key) (Races in bold indicate pole position; races in italics indicate fastest lap)

| Year | Entrant | Chassis | Engine | 1 | 2 | 3 | 4 | 5 | 6 | 7 | 8 | 9 | 10 | 11 | 12 | 13 | 14 | 15 | 16 | 17 | 18 | 19 | 20 | DC | Points |
|---|---|---|---|---|---|---|---|---|---|---|---|---|---|---|---|---|---|---|---|---|---|---|---|---|---|
| 2003 | Prema Powerteam | Dallara F303/022 | Spiess-Opel | HOC; 1 | HOC; 2 | ADR; 1; 14 | ADR; 2; 18 | PAU; 1; 9 | PAU; 2; 4 | NOR; 1 | NOR; 2 | LMS; 1 | LMS; 2 | NÜR; 1 | NÜR; 2 | A1R; 1 | A1R; 2 | ZAN; 1 | ZAN; 2 | HOC; 3 | HOC; 4 | MAG; 1 | MAG; 2 | 21st | 5 |
| 2005 | Manor Motorsport | Dallara F305/025 | Mercedes | HOC; 1 Ret | HOC; 2 DNS | PAU; 1; 5 | PAU; 2; 7 | SPA; 1 DSQ | SPA; 2; 3 | MON; 1; 7 | MON; 2; 5 | **OSC**; **1**; 1 | OSC; 2; 2 | NOR; 1; 5 | NOR; 2; 6 | NÜR; 1; 2 | **NÜR**; **2** Ret | ZAN; 1 Ret | ZAN; 2 Ret | LAU; 1; 8 | LAU; 2; 3 | HOC; 3; 2 | HOC; 4 Ret | 3rd | 68 |

=== Complete British Formula Three Championship results ===
(key) (Races in bold indicate pole position; races in italics indicate fastest lap)

| Year | Entrant | Chassis | Engine | 1 | 2 | 3 | 4 | 5 | 6 | 7 | 8 | 9 | 10 | 11 | 12 | 13 | 14 | 15 | 16 | 17 | 18 | 19 | 20 | 21 | 22 | 23 | 24 | 25 | DC | Points |
|---|---|---|---|---|---|---|---|---|---|---|---|---|---|---|---|---|---|---|---|---|---|---|---|---|---|---|---|---|---|---|
| 2004 | Hitech Racing | Dallara F304 | Renault | DON1; 1; 10 | DON1; 2; 9 | SIL1; 1 Ret | SIL1; 2 C | CRO; 1; 6 | CRO; 2; 3 | KNO; 1; 15 | KNO; 2; 4 | SNE; 1; 3 | **SNE**; **2** Ret | SNE; 3; 7 | CAS; 1; 9 | CAS; 2; 8 | DON2; 1 Ret | DON2; 2 Ret | OUL; 1 Ret | OUL; 2; 2 | SIL2; 1; 11 | SIL2; 2; 11 | THR; 1; 1 | **THR**; **2**; 1 | SPA; 1; 7 | SPA; 2; 6 | BRH; 1 Ret | BRH; 2; 3 | 8th | 130 |

=== Complete GP2 Series results ===
(key) (Races in bold indicate pole position; races in italics indicate fastest lap)

| Year | Entrant | 1 | 2 | 3 | 4 | 5 | 6 | 7 | 8 | 9 | 10 | 11 | 12 | 13 | 14 | 15 | 16 | 17 | 18 | 19 | 20 | 21 | DC | Points |
|---|---|---|---|---|---|---|---|---|---|---|---|---|---|---|---|---|---|---|---|---|---|---|---|---|
| 2006 | Durango | VAL; FEA; 17 | VAL; SPR; 16† | IMO; FEA; Ret | IMO; SPR; Ret | NÜR; FEA; 18 | NÜR; SPR; 13 | CAT; FEA; 12 | CAT; SPR; 9 | MON; FEA; 11 | SIL; FEA; Ret | SIL; SPR; EX | MAG; FEA; 7 | MAG; SPR; 6 | HOC; FEA; Ret | HOC; SPR; Ret | HUN; FEA; 13 | HUN; SPR; Ret | IST; FEA; 5 | IST; SPR; 9 | MNZ; FEA; 10 | MNZ; SPR; 14 | 17th | 8 |
| 2007 | ART Grand Prix | BHR; FEA; 5 | BHR; SPR; Ret | CAT; FEA; 3 | CAT; SPR; 3 | MON; FEA; 5 | MAG; FEA; 2 | MAG; SPR; 4 | SIL; FEA; 4 | SIL; SPR; 4 | NÜR; FEA; 2 | NÜR; SPR; 6 | HUN; FEA; 4 | HUN; SPR; 4 | IST; FEA; 1 | IST; SPR; 11 | MNZ; FEA; 13 | MNZ; SPR; 4 | SPA; FEA; 3 | SPA; SPR; 3 | VAL; FEA; Ret | VAL; SPR; 13 | 2nd | 77 |
| 2008 | Barwa International Campos Team | CAT; FEA | CAT; SPR | IST; FEA | IST; SPR | MON; FEA | MON; SPR | MAG; FEA; 2 | MAG; SPR; 4 | SIL; FEA; 2 | SIL; SPR; 2 | HOC; FEA; 5 | HOC; SPR; Ret | HUN; FEA; 1 | HUN; SPR; 10 | VAL; FEA; 4 | VAL; SPR; 1 | SPA; FEA; 20† | SPA; SPR; 5 | MNZ; FEA; 1 | MNZ; SPR; 11 | | 3rd | 63 |
| 2009 | Racing Engineering | CAT; FEA; Ret | CAT; SPR; 10 | MON; FEA; 4 | MON; SPR; 4 | IST; FEA; 8 | IST; SPR; 1 | SIL; FEA; 2 | SIL; SPR; 19 | NÜR; FEA; 7 | NÜR; SPR; Ret | **HUN**; **FEA**; 2 | HUN; SPR; 3 | VAL; FEA; 19† | VAL; SPR; Ret | SPA; FEA; 3 | SPA; SPR; Ret | MNZ; FEA; 3 | MNZ; SPR; 2 | ALG; FEA; 3 | ALG; SPR; 15 | | 3rd | 63 |

=== Complete Formula One results ===
(key)

| Year | Entrant | Chassis | Engine | 1 | 2 | 3 | 4 | 5 | 6 | 7 | 8 | 9 | 10 | 11 | 12 | 13 | 14 | 15 | 16 | 17 | 18 | 19 | WDC | Points |
|---|---|---|---|---|---|---|---|---|---|---|---|---|---|---|---|---|---|---|---|---|---|---|---|---|
| 2010 | Virgin Racing | Virgin VR-01 | Cosworth CA2010 2.4 V8 | BHR; Ret | AUS; Ret | MAL; 14 | CHN; Ret | ESP; 19 | MON; Ret | TUR; 19 | CAN; 19 | EUR; 17 | GBR; Ret | GER; Ret | HUN; 18 | BEL; 17 | ITA; 20† | SIN; 15 | JPN; DNS | KOR; Ret | BRA; NC | ABU; 18 | 24th | 0 |

^{†} Driver did not finish the Grand Prix, but was classified as they had completed over 90% of the race distance.

=== Complete V8 Supercar results ===
| Year | Team | No. | Car | 1 | 2 | 3 | 4 | 5 | 6 | 7 | 8 | 9 | 10 | 11 | 12 | 13 | 14 | 15 | 16 | 17 | 18 | 19 | 20 | 21 | 22 | 23 | 24 | 25 | 26 | 27 | 28 | 29 | 30 | 31 | Final pos | Points |
|---|---|---|---|---|---|---|---|---|---|---|---|---|---|---|---|---|---|---|---|---|---|---|---|---|---|---|---|---|---|---|---|---|---|---|---|---|
| 2012 | Tekno Autosports | 91 | Holden VE Commodore | ADE; R1 | ADE; R2 | SYM; R3 | SYM; R4 | HAM; R5 | HAM; R6 | BAR; R7 | BAR; R8 | BAR; R9 | PHI; R10 | PHI; R11 | HID; R12 | HID; R13 | TOW; R14 | TOW; R15 | QLD; R16 | QLD; R17 | SMP; R18 | SMP; R19 | SAN; Q | SAN; R20 | BAT; R21 | SUR; R22; 11 | SUR; R23; DNS | YMC; R24 | YMC; R25 | YMC; R26 | WIN; R27 | WIN; R28 | SYD; R29 | SYD; R30 | NC | 0 † |

† Not Eligible for points

=== Complete Stock Car Pro Series results ===
(key) (Races in bold indicate pole position) (Races in italics indicate fastest lap)

| Year | Team | Car | 1 | 2 | 3 | 4 | 5 | 6 | 7 | 8 | 9 | 10 | 11 | 12 | 13 | 14 | 15 | 16 | 17 | 18 | 19 | 20 | 21 | 22 | 23 | Rank | Points |
|---|---|---|---|---|---|---|---|---|---|---|---|---|---|---|---|---|---|---|---|---|---|---|---|---|---|---|---|
| 2014 | Ipiranga-RCM | Chevrolet Sonic | INT; 1 Ret | SCZ; 1 | SCZ; 2 | BRA; 1 | BRA; 2 | GOI; 1 | GOI; 2 | GOI; 1 | CAS; 1 | CAS; 2 | CUR; 1 | CUR; 2 | VEL; 1 | VEL; 2 | SCZ; 1 | SCZ; 2 | TAR; 1 | TAR; 2 | SAL; 1 | SAL; 2 | CUR; 1 | | | NC† | 0† |
| 2015 | Ipiranga-RCM | Chevrolet Sonic | GOI; 1; 5 | RBP; 1 | RBP; 2 | VEL; 1 | VEL; 2 | CUR; 1 | CUR; 2 | SCZ; 1 | SCZ; 2 | CUR; 1 | CUR; 2 | GOI; 1 | CAS; 1 | CAS; 2 | BRA; 1 | BRA; 2 | CUR; 1 | CUR; 2 | TAR; 1 | TAR; 2 | INT; 1 | | | NC† | 0† |
| 2016 | Ipiranga-RCM | Chevrolet Sonic | CUR; 1; 14 | VEL; 1 | VEL; 2 | GOI; 1 | GOI; 2 | SCZ; 1 | SCZ; 2 | TAR; 1 | TAR; 2 | CAS; 1 | CAS; 2 | INT; 1 | LON; 1 | LON; 2 | CUR; 1 | CUR; 2 | GOI; 1 | GOI; 2 | CDC; 1 | CDC; 2 | INT; 1 | | | NC† | 0† |
| 2018 | RCM Motorsport | Chevrolet Cruze | INT; 1 Ret | CUR; 1; 6 | CUR; 2; 1 | VEL; 1 Ret | VEL; 2 DNS | LON; 1; 7 | LON; 2; 1 | SCZ; 1 | SCZ; 2 | GOI; 1; 21 | MOU; 1 Ret | MOU; 2 Ret | CAS; 1; 1 | CAS; 2 Ret | VCA; 1; 5 | VCA; 2 Ret | TAR; 1 | TAR; 2 | GOI; 1 Ret | GOI; 2; 4 | INT; 1; 24 | | | 12th | 127 |
| 2019 | Eurofarma RC | Chevrolet Cruze | VEL; 1 | VCA; 1 | VCA; 2 | GOI; 1 | GOI; 2 | LON; 1 | LON; 2 | SCZ; 1 | SCZ; 2 | MOU; 1 | MOU; 2 | **INT**; **1** DSQ | VEL; 1 | VEL; 2 | CAS; 1 | CAS; 2 | VCA; 1 | VCA; 2 | GOI; 1 | GOI; 2 | INT; 1 | | | 34th | 0 |
| 2026 | RCM Motorsport | Mitsubishi Eclipse Cross | CRS; 1 | CRS; 2 | CAS; 1 | CAS; 2 | INT; 1 | INT; 2 | GOI; 1 | GOI; 2 | CUI; 1 | CUI; 2 | VCA; 1 | VCA; 2 | SCZ; 1 | SCZ; 2 | CRS; 1 | CRS; 2 | BRA; 1; 1 | CAS; 1 | CAS; 2 | VEL; 1 | VEL; 2 | INT; 1 | INT; 2 | 33rd* | 80* |

^{†} Ineligible for championship points. ^{*} Season still in progress.

=== Complete Deutsche Tourenwagen Masters results ===
(key) (Races in bold indicate pole position) (Races in italics indicate fastest lap)

| Year | Team | Car | 1 | 2 | 3 | 4 | 5 | 6 | 7 | 8 | 9 | 10 | 11 | 12 | 13 | 14 | 15 | 16 | Pos. | Points |
|---|---|---|---|---|---|---|---|---|---|---|---|---|---|---|---|---|---|---|---|---|
| 2021 | Abt Sportsline | Audi R8 LMS Evo | MNZ; 1 | MNZ; 2 | LAU; 1 | LAU; 2 | ZOL; 1 | ZOL; 2 | NÜR; 1 | NÜR; 2 | RBR; 1 | RBR; 2 | ASS; 1 | ASS; 2 | HOC; 1; 15 | HOC; 2 Ret | NOR; 1; 15 | NOR; 2; 12 | NC† | 0† |

^{†} As di Grassi was a guest driver, he was ineligible to score points.

=== Complete FIA World Endurance Championship results ===
| Year | Entrant | Class | Chassis | Engine | 1 | 2 | 3 | 4 | 5 | 6 | 7 | 8 | 9 | Rank | Points |
|---|---|---|---|---|---|---|---|---|---|---|---|---|---|---|---|
| 2012 | Audi Sport Team Joest | LMP1 | Audi R18 e-tron quattro | Audi TDI 3.7L Turbo V6 (Hybrid Diesel) | SEB | SPA | LMS | SIL | SÃO; 3 | BHR | FUJ | SHA | | 22nd | 15 |
| 2013 | Audi Sport Team Joest | LMP1 | Audi R18 e-tron quattro | Audi TDI 3.7L Turbo V6 (Hybrid Diesel) | SIL | SPA; 3 | LMS; 3 | SÃO | COA | FUJ | SHA | BHR | | 9th | 45 |
| 2014 | Audi Sport Team Joest | LMP1 | Audi R18 e-tron quattro | Audi TDI 4.0 L Turbo V6 (Hybrid Diesel) | SIL; Ret | SPA; 2 | LMS; 2 | COA; 2 | FUJ; 5 | SHA; 5 | BHR; 5 | SÃO; 3 | | 4th | 117 |
| 2015 | Audi Sport Team Joest | LMP1 | Audi R18 e-tron quattro | Audi TDI 4.0 L Turbo V6 (Hybrid Diesel) | SIL; 5 | SPA; 7 | LMS; 4 | NÜR; 4 | COA; 3 | FUJ; 4 | SHA; 4 | BHR; 6 | | 4th | 99 |
| 2016 | Audi Sport Team Joest | LMP1 | Audi R18 | Audi TDI 4.0 L Turbo Diesel V6 (Hybrid) | SIL; Ret | SPA; 1 | LMS; 3 | NÜR; 2 | **MEX**; 15 | COA; 2 | **FUJ**; 2 | SHA; 5 | **BHR**; 1 | 2nd | 147.5 |

=== 24 Hours of Le Mans results ===
| Year | Team | Co-drivers | Car | Class | Laps | Pos. | Class pos. |
|---|---|---|---|---|---|---|---|
| 2013 | (Germany) Audi Sport Team Joest | (Spain) Marc Gené (United Kingdom) Oliver Jarvis | Audi R18 e-tron quattro | LMP1 | 347 | 3rd | 3rd |
| 2014 | (Germany) Audi Sport Team Joest | (Denmark) Tom Kristensen (Spain) Marc Gené | Audi R18 e-tron quattro | LMP1-H | 376 | 2nd | 2nd |
| 2015 | (Germany) Audi Sport Team Joest | (France) Loïc Duval (United Kingdom) Oliver Jarvis | Audi R18 e-tron quattro | LMP1 | 392 | 4th | 4th |
| 2016 | (Germany) Audi Sport Team Joest | (France) Loïc Duval (United Kingdom) Oliver Jarvis | Audi R18 | LMP1 | 372 | 3rd | 3rd |

=== Complete Formula E results ===
(key) (Races in bold indicate pole position; races in italics indicate fastest lap)

| Year | Team | Chassis | Powertrain | 1 | 2 | 3 | 4 | 5 | 6 | 7 | 8 | 9 | 10 | 11 | 12 | 13 | 14 | 15 | 16 | 17 | Pos | Points |
|---|---|---|---|---|---|---|---|---|---|---|---|---|---|---|---|---|---|---|---|---|---|---|
| 2014–15 | Audi Sport ABT | Spark SRT01-e | SRT01-e | BEI; 1 | PUT; 2 | PDE; 3 | BUE; Ret | MIA; 9 | LBH; 3 | MCO; 2 | BER; DSQ | MSC; 2 | LDN; 4 | LDN; 6 | | | | | | | 3rd | 133 |
| 2015–16 | ABT Schaeffler Audi Sport | Spark SRT01-e | ABT Schaeffler FE01 | BEI; 2 | PUT; 1 | PDE; 2 | BUE; 3 | MEX; DSQ | LBH; 1 | PAR; 1 | BER; 3 | LDN; 4 | LDN; Ret | | | | | | | | 2nd | 153 |
| 2016–17 | ABT Schaeffler Audi Sport | Spark SRT01-e | ABT Schaeffler FE02 | HKG; 2 | MRK; 5 | **BUE**; 3 | MEX; 1 | MCO; 2 | PAR; Ret | **BER**; 2 | BER; 3 | NYC; 4 | NYC; 5 | **MTL**; 1 | MTL; 7 | | | | | | 1st | 181 |
| 2017–18 | Audi Sport ABT Schaeffler | Spark SRT01-e | Audi e-tron FE04 | HKG; 17 | HKG; 14 | MRK; Ret | SCL; Ret | MEX; 9 | PDE; 2 | RME; 2 | PAR; 2 | BER; 2 | ZUR; 1 | NYC; 1 | NYC; 2 | | | | | | 2nd | 144 |
| 2018–19 | Audi Sport ABT Schaeffler | Spark SRT05e | Audi e-tron FE05 | ADR; 9 | MRK; 7 | SCL; 12 | MEX; 1 | HKG; 2 | SYX; 15† | RME; 7 | PAR; 4 | MCO; Ret | BER; 1 | BRN; 9 | NYC; 5 | NYC; 18† | | | | | 3rd | 108 |
| 2019–20 | Audi Sport ABT Schaeffler | Spark SRT05e | Audi e-tron FE06 | DIR; 13 | DIR; 2 | SCL; 7 | MEX; 6 | MRK; 7 | BER; 8 | BER; 3 | BER; 8 | BER; 6 | BER; 21 | BER; 6 | | | | | | | 6th | 77 |
| 2020–21 | Audi Sport ABT Schaeffler | Spark SRT05e | Audi e-tron FE07 | DIR; 9 | DIR; 8 | RME; Ret | RME; Ret | VLC; 7 | VLC; 10 | MCO; 10 | PUE; 1 | PUE; 18 | NYC; 3 | NYC; 14 | LDN; 6 | LDN; DSQ | BER; 1 | BER; 20 | | | 7th | 87 |
| 2021–22 | ROKiT Venturi Racing | Spark SRT05e | Mercedes-EQ Silver Arrow 02 | DRH; 5 | DRH; 3 | MEX; 12 | RME; 11 | RME; 8 | MCO; 6 | BER; Ret | BER; 4 | JAK; 7 | MRK; 5 | NYC; 2 | NYC; Ret | LDN; 9 | LDN; 1 | SEO; 3 | SEO; 10 | | 5th | 127 |
| 2022–23 | Mahindra Racing | Formula E Gen3 | Mahindra M9Electro | **MEX**; 3 | DRH; 13 | DRH; 15 | HYD; 14 | CAP; WD | SAP; 13 | BER; 11 | BER; 12 | MCO; 12 | JAK; 14 | JAK; 14 | POR; 7 | RME; Ret | RME; Ret | LDN; 6 | LDN; 14 | | 15th | 32 |
| 2023–24 | ABT CUPRA Formula E Team | Formula E Gen3 | Mahindra M10Electro | MEX; Ret | DRH; 19 | DRH; 17 | SAP; 13 | TOK; Ret | MIS; 10 | MIS; 11 | MCO; 11 | BER; Ret | BER; 11 | SHA; 10 | SHA; 19 | POR; 11 | POR; 17 | LDN; 11 | LDN; 9 | | 23rd | 4 |
| 2024–25 | Lola Yamaha ABT Formula E Team | Formula E Gen3 Evo | Lola-Yamaha T001 | SAO; Ret | MEX; 20 | JED; DSQ | JED; 16 | MIA; 2 | MCO; 13 | MCO; Ret | TKO; 17 | TKO; 5 | SHA; 18 | SHA; 9 | JKT; 13 | BER; 18 | BER; 12 | LDN; 17 | LDN; 9 | | 17th | 32 |
| 2025–26 | Lola Yamaha ABT Formula E Team | Formula E Gen3 Evo | Lola-Yamaha T001 | SAO; Ret | MEX; 13 | MIA; 13 | JED; 16 | JED; 15 | MAD; 12 | BER; 17 | BER; 16 | MCO; 8 | MCO; 9 | SAN; 10 | SHA; 18 | SHA; 1 | TKO; 11 | TKO; 11 | LDN; Ret | LDN; Ret | 17th | 32 |

^{†} Driver did not finish the race, but was classified as he completed over 90% of the race distance.

== Notes ==
Sporting positions
| Preceded by Alexandre Prémat | Macau Grand Prix; Winner; 2005 | Succeeded by Mike Conway |
| Preceded by Michael Schumacher | Desafio Internacional das Estrelas; Winner; 2010 | Succeeded by Jaime Alguersuari |
| Preceded by Sébastien Buemi | Formula E Champion; 2016-17 | Succeeded by Jean-Éric Vergne |
