= Red Bull Junior Team =

Red Bull's driver development program

(Austria) Red Bull Junior Team
- Founded: 2001; 25 years ago
- Base: Milton Keynes, Buckinghamshire, England
- Team principal(s): Guillaume Rocquelin (Head of Driver Academy)
- Current drivers: Red Bull Junior Team; FIA Formula 2 (Bulgaria) Nikola Tsolov; FIA Formula 3 (Argentina) Mattia Colnaghi (Mexico) Ernesto Rivera (Republic of Ireland) Fionn McLaughlin; Eurocup-3 (Thailand) Enzo Tarnvanichkul; Formula 4 (Sweden) Scott Kin Lindblom (Switzerland) Chiara Bättig (Netherlands) Rocco Coronel; Ginetta Junior (Sweden) Melvin Kalousdian; Red Bull Academy Programme; F1 Academy (United Kingdom) Alisha Palmowski (Brazil) Rafaela Ferreira
- Website: Red Bull Junior Team

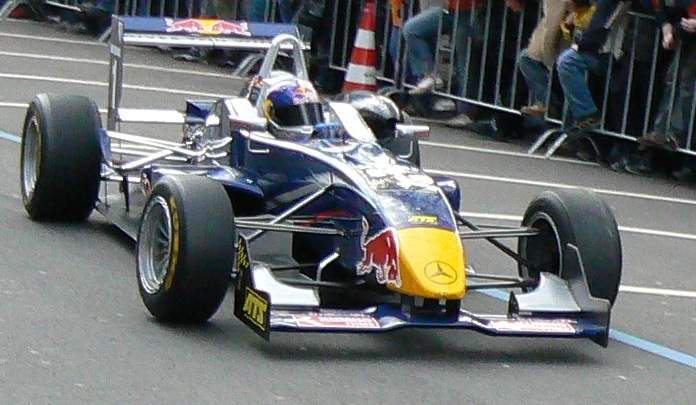
Sebastian Vettel in a Formula 3 Euro Series car in 2006, featuring prominent Red Bull sponsorship

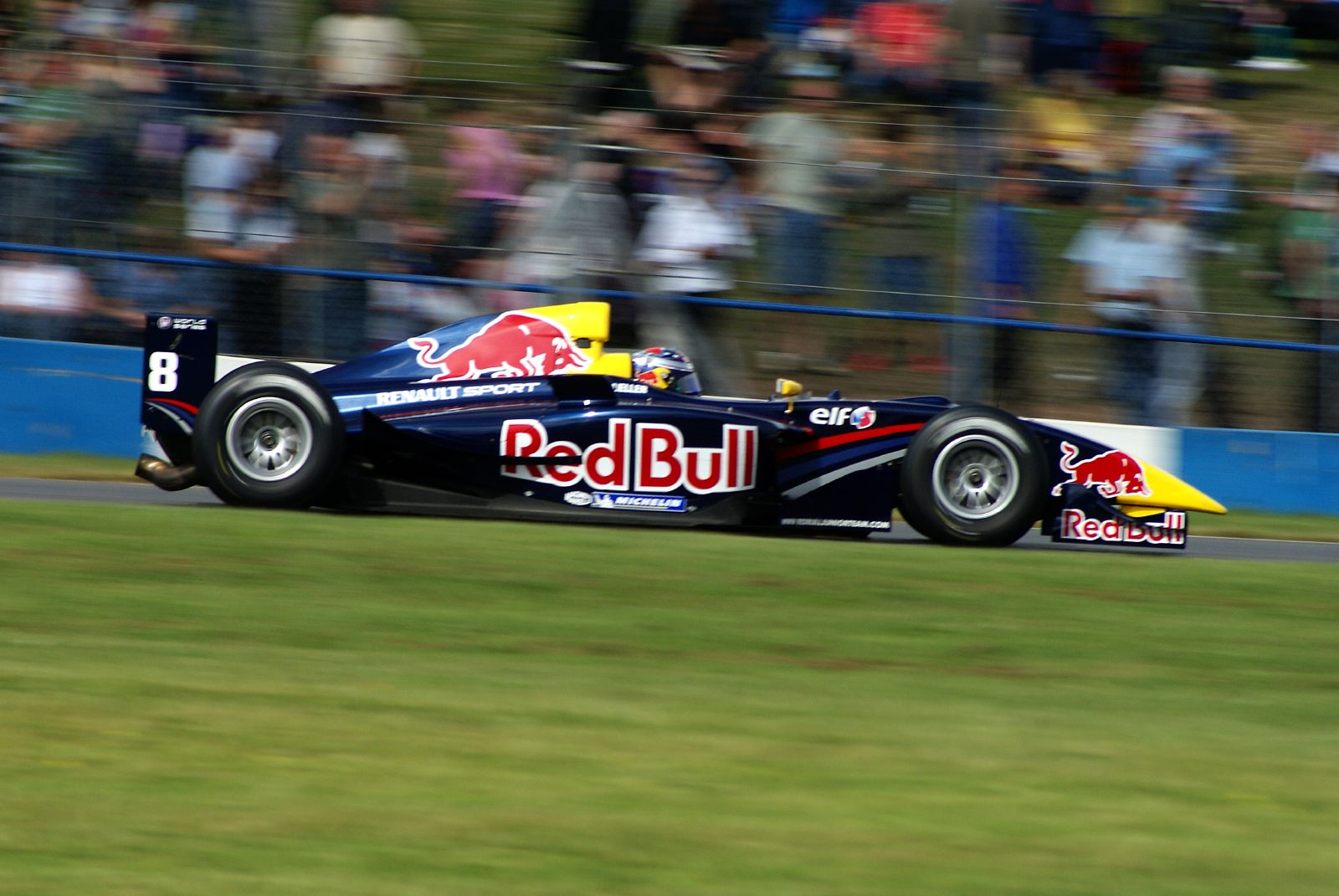
Michael Ammermüller racing in the World Series By Renault in 2007

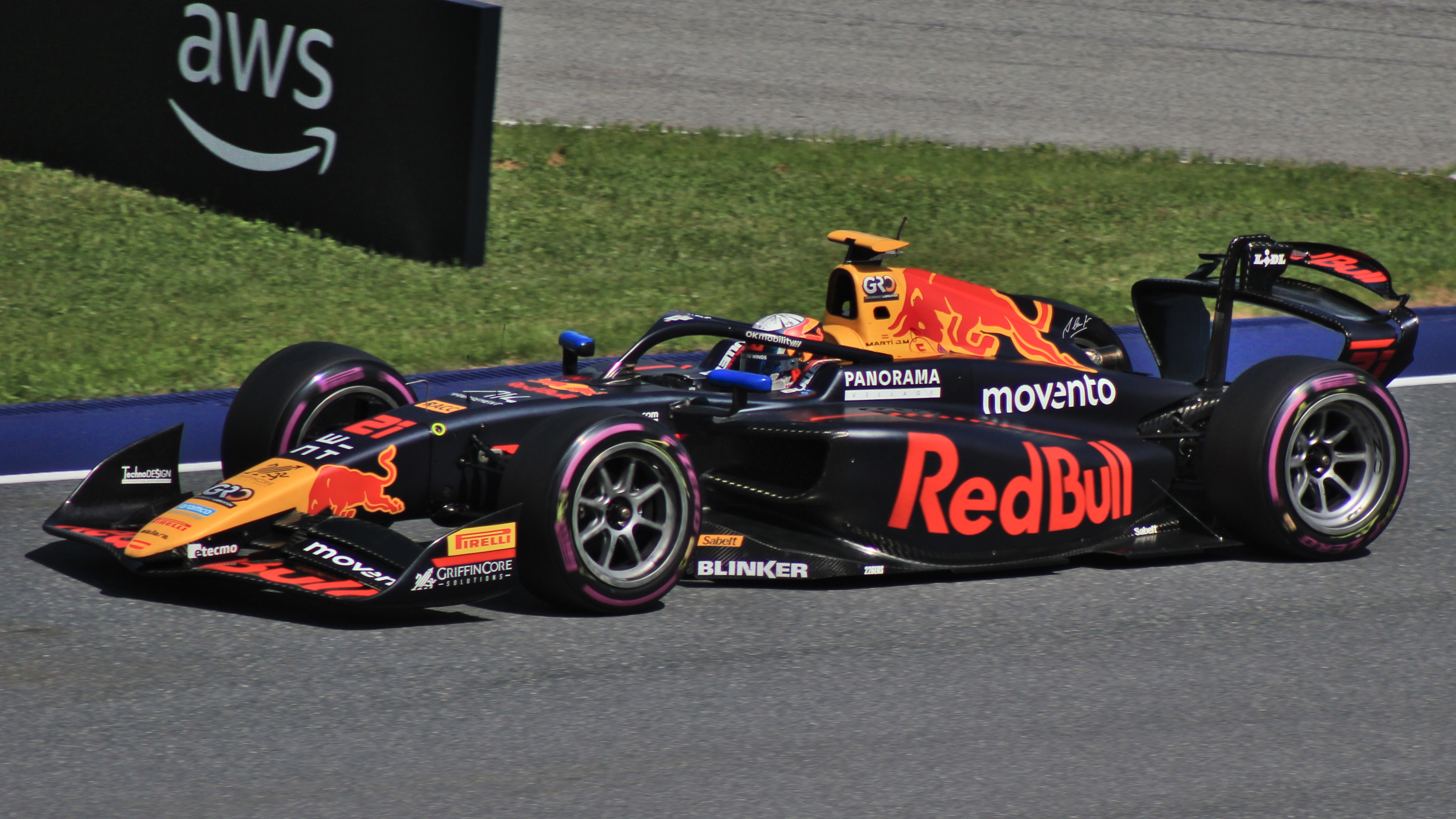
Pepe Martí at the 2024 Spielberg Formula 2 round

The Red Bull Junior Team is a driver development programme operated by Austrian conglomerate company Red Bull GmbH to identify and develop talent in open-wheel racing. Members of the Junior Team are financed and sponsored by Red Bull in kart racing and junior formulae.

The programs have been successful in bringing a selection of drivers into Formula One. Five graduates—Sebastian Vettel, Daniel Ricciardo, Max Verstappen, Pierre Gasly and Carlos Sainz Jr.—have won a Formula One Grand Prix, whilst Vettel and Verstappen have won the World Drivers' Championship a combined eight times. Red Bull owns two teams in Formula One, Red Bull Racing and Racing Bulls.

The Red Bull Junior Team was also the name of RSM Marko, a team that competed in International Formula 3000 between 1999 and 2003, sponsored by Red Bull and run by Helmut Marko.

The Red Bull Junior Team was formed in 2001 as Red Bull's European driver programme. Red Bull offers funding and support for the promising young drivers that are part of the programme. In 2004, Christian Klien became the first Red Bull Junior to race in Formula One, while in 2008, Sebastian Vettel became the first Red Bull Junior to win a Formula One Grand Prix, the Italian Grand Prix. Two years later, in 2010, Vettel became the first Red Bull Junior graduate to win the Formula One World Championship.

The similar Red Bull Driver Search, now ended, was an American spin-off of the same idea held in 2005. In 2024, Red Bull formed a separate programme called the Red Bull Academy Programme to support the team's F1 Academy drivers.

== Current drivers ==
Red Bull Junior Team drivers
Driver	Years	Current Series	Titles as Red Bull Junior
(Thailand) Enzo Tarnvanichkul	2023–	Eurocup-3 Spanish Winter Championship; Eurocup-3	None
(Netherlands) Rocco Coronel	2024–	Formula Winter Series; F4 Spanish Championship	Ginetta Junior Championship (2025)
(Sweden) Scott Kin Lindblom	2024–	UAE4 Series; F4 British Championship	None
(Republic of Ireland) Fionn McLaughlin	2024–	Formula Regional Oceania Trophy; FIA Formula 3 Championship	F4 British Championship (2025)
(Mexico) Ernesto Rivera	2024–	Formula Regional Oceania Trophy; FIA Formula 3 Championship	None
(Bulgaria) Nikola Tsolov	2025–	FIA Formula 2 Championship	None
(Switzerland) Chiara Bättig	2025–	Formula Winter Series; F4 British Championship	None
(Argentina) Mattia Colnaghi	2025–	FIA Formula 3 Championship	None
(Sweden) Melvin Kalousdian	2026–	Ginetta Junior Championship	None
(United Kingdom) Alisha Palmowski	2027– (Note: Palmowski was a member of the Red Bull Academy Programme in 2025–2026, and graduated to the Red Bull Junior Team in 2027.)	F1 Academy	None
(Finland) Robin Räikkönen	2027–	TBA	None

== Graduates to Red Bull Racing in Formula 1 ==
Driver	Junior Team experience		F1 experience with Red Bull		F1 experience with other teams
Driver	Years	Former series	Toro Rosso / AlphaTauri / Racing Bulls	Red Bull Racing	F1 experience with other teams
(Austria) Christian Klien	2001–2003	Formula BMW ADAC (2001); **Formula Renault 2000 Germany** (**2002**); Formula Renault 2000 Eurocup (2002); Formula 3 Euro Series (2003)	—N/a	2005–2006	Jaguar (2004); HRT (2010)
(Germany) Sebastian Vettel	2001–2007	Karting (2001–2002); **Formula BMW ADAC** (2003–**2004**); Formula 3 Euro Series (2005–2006); Formula Renault 3.5 Series (2006–2007)	2007–2008	2009; **2010–2013**; 2014	BMW Sauber (2007); Ferrari (2015–2020); Aston Martin (2021–2022)
(Italy) Vitantonio Liuzzi	2002–2004	German Formula Three Championship (2002); **International Formula 3000** (2003–**2004)**	2006–2007	2005	Force India (2009–2010); HRT (2011)
(Australia) Daniel Ricciardo	2008–2011	Eurocup Formula Renault 2.0 (2008); **Formula Renault 2.0 West European Cup** (**2008**); **British Formula 3 Championship** (**2009**); Formula Renault 3.5 Series (2009–2011)	2012–2013; 2023–2024	2014–2018	HRT (2011); Renault (2019–2020); McLaren (2021–2022)
(Thailand) Alexander Albon†	2008–2012	Karting (2008–2011); Formula Renault 2.0 Alps (2012); Eurocup Formula Renault 2.0 (2012)	2019 (Note: Albon was promoted to Red Bull Racing mid-season following the 2019 Hungarian Grand Prix, replacing Gasly who was demoted back to Toro Rosso.)	2019–2020	Williams (2022–present)
(Russia) Daniil Kvyat	2010–2013	Formula BMW Europe (2010); Formula BMW Pacific (2010); Eurocup Formula Renault 2.0 (2010–2012); Formula Renault 2.0 Northern European Cup (2011); Toyota Racing Series (2011); **Formula Renault 2.0 Alps** (**2012**); **GP3 Series** (**2013**); FIA Formula 3 European Championship (2013)	2014; 2016 (Note: Verstappen was promoted to Red Bull Racing mid-season following the 2016 Russian Grand Prix, replacing Kvyat who was demoted back to Toro Rosso.)–2017; 2019–2020	2015–2016	—N/a
(Netherlands) Max Verstappen†	2014	FIA Formula 3 European Championship (2014)	2015–2016	2016–2020; **2021–2024**; 2025–present	—N/a
(France) Pierre Gasly†	2014–2017	Formula Renault 3.5 Series (2014); **GP2 Series** (2014–**2016**); Super Formula (2017)	2017–2018, 2019–2022	2019	Alpine (2023–present)
(Japan) Yuki Tsunoda (Note: Driver was simultaneously a member of the Honda Formula Dream Project.)	2019–2020	FIA Formula 3 Championship (2019); Euroformula Open Championship (2019); Toyota Racing Series (2020); FIA Formula 2 Championship (2020)	2021–2025, (Note: Tsunoda was promoted to Red Bull Racing mid-season following the 2025 Chinese Grand Prix, replacing Lawson who was demoted back to Racing Bulls.) 2026 (Note: As a substitute driver.)	2025	—N/a
(New Zealand) Liam Lawson†	2019–2023	FIA Formula 3 Championship (2019–2020); Deutsche Tourenwagen Masters (2021); FIA Formula 2 Championship (2021–2022); Super Formula Championship (2023)	2023–2024, 2025–present	2025, 2026	—N/a
(France) Isack Hadjar†	2022–2024	Formula Regional Asian Championship (2022); FIA Formula 3 Championship (2022); FIA Formula 2 Championship (2023–2024)	2025	2026–present	—N/a

- Championship titles highlighted in **bold**.
- † denotes currently active Formula 1 drivers.

== Graduates to Toro Rosso/AlphaTauri/Racing Bulls ==
This list includes drivers who have graduated from the Junior Team to Toro Rosso, AlphaTauri and Racing Bulls but have not raced for Red Bull Racing. Former Red Bull Junior Team drivers who have driven for both Toro Rosso/AlphaTauri/RB and Red Bull Racing appear on the Graduates to Red Bull Racing table.

Driver	Junior Team experience		Toro Rosso / AlphaTauri / Racing Bulls	F1 experience with other teams
Driver	Years	Former series	Toro Rosso / AlphaTauri / Racing Bulls	F1 experience with other teams
(United States) Scott Speed	2003–2005	British Formula 3 Championship (2003); **Formula Renault 2000 Germany** (**2004**); **Formula Renault 2000 Eurocup** (**2004**); GP2 Series (2005); A1GP (2005)	2006–2007	—N/a
(Switzerland) Sébastien Buemi	2005–2008	Formula BMW ADAC (2005); Formula Renault 2.0 NEC (2006); Formula 3 Euro Series (2006–07); A1GP (2006–07); GP2 Series (2007–08); GP2 Asia Series (2008)	2009–2011	—N/a
(Spain) Jaime Alguersuari	2006–2009	Eurocup Formula Renault 2.0 (2006–2007); Italian Formula Renault Championship (2006–2007); **British Formula 3 Championship** (**2008**); Spanish Formula Three Championship (2008); Formula Renault 3.5 Series (2009)	2009–2011	—N/a
(New Zealand) Brendon Hartley	2006–2010	Formula Renault 2.0 NEC (2006); **Eurocup Formula Renault 2.0** (2006–**2007**); Formula Renault 2.0 Italia (2007); British Formula 3 (2008); Formula 3 Euro Series (2008–2009); Formula Renault 3.5 Series (2009–2010)	2017–2018	—N/a
(France) Jean-Éric Vergne	2008–2011	Eurocup Formula Renault 2.0 (2008–2009); Formula Renault 2.0 West European Cup (2008–2009); **British Formula 3 Championship** (**2010**); GP3 Series (2010); Formula Renault 3.5 Series (2010–2011)	2012–2014	—N/a
(Spain) Carlos Sainz Jr.†	2010–2014	Formula BMW Europe (2010); Formula BMW Pacific (2010); European F3 Open (2010); Eurocup Formula Renault 2.0 (2010–2011); **Formula Renault 2.0 Northern European Cup** (**2011**); Formula 3 Euro Series (2011–2012); British Formula 3 Championship (2012); GP3 Series (2013); **Formula Renault 3.5 Series** (2013–**2014**)	2015–2017	Renault (2017–2018); McLaren (2019–2020); Ferrari (2021–2024); Williams (2025–present)
(United Kingdom) Arvid Lindblad†	2021–2025	Italian F4 Championship (2022); Formula 4 UAE Championship (2023); Italian F4 Championship (2023); Euro 4 Championship (2023); Formula Regional Middle East Championship (2024); FIA Formula 3 Championship (2024); **Formula Regional Oceania Championship** (**2025**); FIA Formula 2 Championship (2025)	2026–present	—N/a

- Championship titles highlighted in **bold**.
- † denotes currently active Formula 1 drivers.

== Former drivers ==
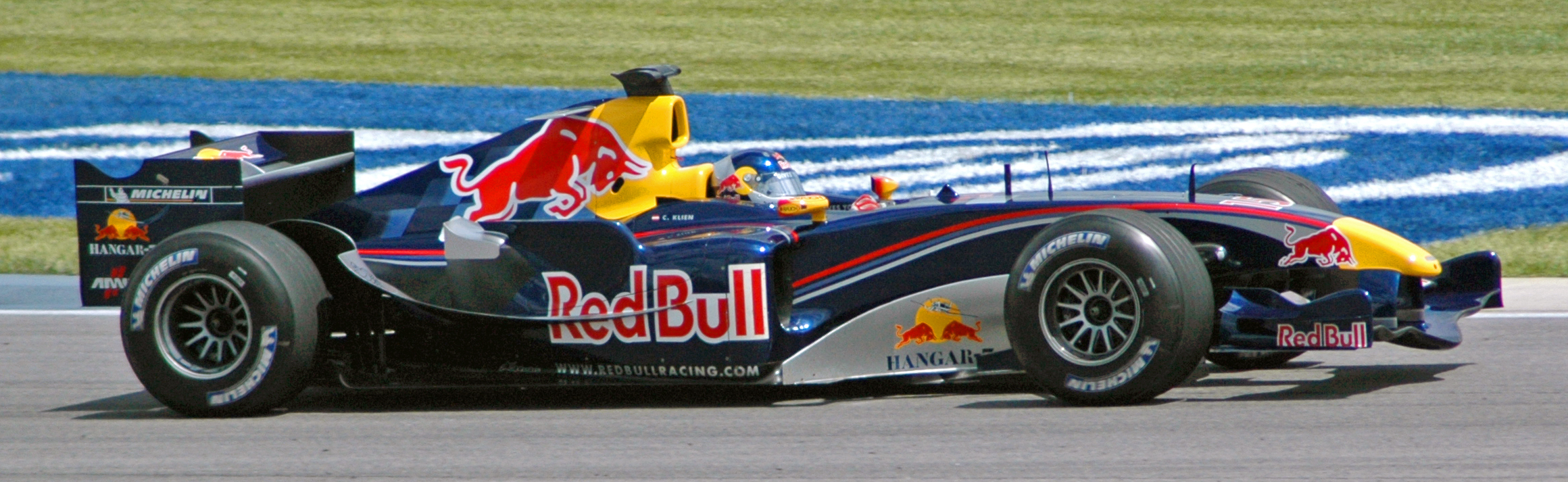
Christian Klien driving for Red Bull Racing at the 2005 United States Grand Prix

Driver	Years	Series competed	F1 Team(s)
(Brazil) Ricardo Maurício	2001–2002	International Formula 3000 (2001–2002)	None
(Austria) Bernhard Auinger	2001–2003	German Formula 3 (2001–02); International Formula 3000 (2003); Formula 3 Euro Series (2003)	None
(Austria) Patrick Friesacher	2001–2003	International Formula 3000 (2001–2003)	Minardi (2005)
(Austria) Reinhard Kofler	2001–2004	Formula BMW Junior Cup (2001); Formula BMW ADAC (2002); Formula Renault 2000 Masters/Eurocup (2003–2004); Formula Renault 2000 Germany (2003–2004)	None
(Austria) Christopher Wassermann	2001–2004	Karting (2001–2002); Formula BMW ADAC (2003–2004)	None
(Austria) Martin Ragginger	2002–2006	Karting (2002–2004); Formula BMW ADAC (2005–2006)	None
(United States) Paul Edwards	2003	World Series By Nissan (2003)	None
(United States) Grant Maiman	2003	Formula Renault 2000 Masters (2003); Formula Renault 2000 Italia (2003); Formula Renault 2000 Germany (2003)	None
(United States) Joel Nelson	2003	Euro Formula 3000 (2003); British Formula 3 (2003)	None
(Austria) Mathias Lauda	2003–2004	World Series Lights (2003); International Formula 3000 (2004)	None
(Austria) Norbert Siedler	2003–2004	World Series By Nissan (2003); Euro Formula 3000 (2004)	None
(United States) Dominique Claessens	2004	Formula Renault 2000 Eurocup (2004); Formula Renault 2000 Germany (2004)	None
(United States) Matt Jaskol	2004	Formula BMW USA (2004)	None
(India) Narain Karthikeyan	2004	World Series By Nissan (2004)	Jordan (2005); HRT (2012–13)
(Finland) Atte Mustonen	2004	Karting (2004)	None
(Mexico) Guillermo Rojas	2004	Formula Renault V6 Eurocup (2004)	None
(Colombia) Federico Montoya	2004	Formula BMW ADAC (2004); Formula BMW USA (2004)	None
(United States) Colin Fleming	2004–2006	Formula Renault 2000 Eurocup (2004); Formula Renault 2000 Germany (2004); Formula Renault 3.5 Series (2005–2006)	None
(Germany) Michael Ammermüller	2004–2007	Formula Renault 2000 Germany (2004); Eurocup Formula Renault 2.0 (2004–2005); Formula Renault 2.0 Italia (2005); GP2 Series (2006–2007); Formula Renault 3.5 Series (2007); A1GP (2007)	None
(South Africa) Adrian Zaugg	2004–2007	Formula BMW ADAC (2004); Eurocup Formula Renault 2.0 (2005–2006); Formula Renault 2.0 Italia (2005–2006); Formula Renault 3.5 Series (2006); A1GP (2006–07 & 2007); GP2 Series (2007)	None
(Hong Kong) Jim Ka To	2005	Asian Formula Renault Challenge (2005)	None
(Argentina) Matías Milla	2005	Eurocup Formula Renault 2.0 (2005); Formula Renault 2.0 Germany (2005)	None
(Finland) Teemu Nyman	2005	Eurocup Formula Renault 2.0 (2005); Formula Renault 2.0 Germany (2005)	None
(Austria) Philipp Eng	2005–2006	Karting (2005); Formula BMW ADAC (2006)	None
(Switzerland) Neel Jani	2005, 2007	GP2 Series (2005); **A1GP** (2005 & **2007**); Champ Car (2007)	None
(Portugal) Filipe Albuquerque	2005–2007	Spanish Formula 3 (2005); Formula Renault 2.0 Germany (2005); **Eurocup Formula Renault 2.0** (2005–**2006**); **Formula Renault 2.0 NEC** (**2006**); Formula Renault 3.5 Series (2007); GP2 Series (2007); A1GP (2007)	None
(United States) John Edwards	2005–2007	Formula Renault 2.0 Germany (2005); Eurocup Formula Renault 2.0 (2005–2006); Formula Renault 2.0 NEC (2006); Atlantic Championship (2007)	None
(Monaco) Stefano Coletti	2005–2008	Formula BMW ADAC (2005–2006); Eurocup Formula Renault 2.0 (2006–2007); Formula Renault 2.0 Italia (2007); Formula 3 Euro Series (2008)	None
(Russia) Mikhail Aleshin	2005–2009	Eurocup Formula Renault 2.0 (2005); Formula Renault 2.0 Germany (2005); A1GP (2005–06); Formula Renault 3.5 Series (2006–2008); GP2 Series (2007); FIA Formula Two Championship (2009)	None
(Russia) Sergey Afanasyev	2006	Formula Renault 2.0 Suisse (2006); Formula Renault 2.0 NEC (2006)	None
(Australia) Nathan Antunes	2006	Formula Renault 2.0 NEC (2006); German Formula 3 (2006)	None
(Japan) Yoshitaka Kuroda	2006	Formula BMW ADAC (2006)	None
(Republic of Ireland) Niall Quinn	2006	Formula BMW UK (2006)	None
(United Kingdom) Oliver Oakes	2006–2007	Formula BMW UK (2006); Eurocup Formula Renault 2.0 (2007); Formula Renault 2.0 NEC (2007)	None
(Italy) Edoardo Piscopo	2006–2007	Eurocup Formula Renault 2.0 (2006); Formula Renault 2.0 Italia (2006); Toyota Racing Series (2006–07); Formula 3 Euro Series (2007); A1GP (2007)	None
(Canada) Robert Wickens	2006–2009	Formula BMW USA (2006); Atlantic Championship (2007); Formula Renault 3.5 Series (2007–2008); A1GP (2007–08); Formula 3 Euro Series (2008); FIA Formula Two Championship (2009)	None
(Brazil) Pedro Bianchini	2007	Formula BMW ADAC (2007)	None
(Germany) Kevin Mirocha	2007	Formula BMW ADAC (2007)	None
(Canada) Daniel Morad	2007	**Formula BMW USA** (**2007**)	None
(France) Tom Dillmann	2007–2008	Formula 3 Euro Series (2007–2008)	None
(France) Jean-Karl Vernay	2007–2008	A1GP (2007); Formula 3 Euro Series (2007–2008)	None
(Finland) Mika Mäki	2007–2009	Eurocup Formula Renault 2.0 (2007); **Formula Renault 2.0 Italia** (**2007**); Formula 3 Euro Series (2008–2009)	None
(India) Karun Chandhok	2008	GP2 Series (2008); GP2 Asia Series (2008)	HRT (2010); Team Lotus (2011)
(Spain) Daniel Juncadella	2008–2009	Formula BMW Americas (2008); Formula BMW Europe (2008–2009)	None
(Italy) Mirko Bortolotti	2009	FIA Formula Two Championship (2009)	None
(Germany) Stefan Wackerbauer	2012	Eurocup Formula Renault 2.0 (2012); Formula Renault 2.0 Alps (2012)	None
(United Kingdom) Lewis Williamson	2012	Formula Renault 3.5 Series (2012)	None
(Portugal) António Félix da Costa	2012–2013	GP3 Series (2012); Formula Renault 3.5 Series (2012–2013)	None
(South Africa) Callan O'Keeffe	2012–2013	ADAC Formel Masters (2012–2013)	None
(United Kingdom) Tom Blomqvist	2013	FIA Formula 3 European Championship (2013)	None
(Netherlands) Beitske Visser	2013	ADAC Formel Masters (2013)	None
(United Kingdom) Alex Lynn	2014	**GP3 Series** (**2014**)	None
(United Kingdom) Callum Ilott	2015	European Formula 3 Championship (2015); Toyota Racing Series (2015)	None
(United Kingdom) Dean Stoneman	2015	Formula Renault 3.5 Series (2015); GP2 Series (2015)	None
(Australia) Luis Leeds	2016	F4 British Championship (2016); NACAM Formula 4 Championship (2016)	None
(Brazil) Sérgio Sette Câmara	2016	FIA Formula 3 European Championship (2016)	None
(Finland) Niko Kari	2016–2017	FIA Formula 3 European Championship (2016); GP3 Series (2017)	None
(Netherlands) Richard Verschoor	2016–2017	**SMP F4 Championship** (**2016**); **F4 Spanish Championship** (**2016**); Eurocup Formula Renault 2.0 (2017); Toyota Racing Series (2017)	None
(United States) Neil Verhagen	2017–2018	Formula Renault Eurocup (2017–2018); Formula Renault NEC (2017–2018)	None
(United Kingdom) Dan Ticktum	2017–2019	Formula Renault Eurocup (2017); **FIA F3 World Cup** (**2017**–**2018**); FIA Formula 3 European Championship (2018); Super Formula Championship (2019)	None
(Japan) Nirei Fukuzumi	2018	FIA Formula 2 Championship (2018); Super Formula Championship (2018)	None
(United Kingdom) Harry Thompson	2018–2019	Karting	None
(Australia) Jack Doohan	2018–2021	F4 British Championship (2018); Euroformula Open Championship (2019); F3 Asian Championship (2019–2020); FIA Formula 3 Championship (2020–2021); FIA Formula 2 Championship (2021)	Alpine (2024–2025)
(United Kingdom) Jonny Edgar	2018–2022	Karting (2018); **ADAC Formula 4 Championship** (2019–**2020**); Italian F4 Championship (2019–2020); FIA Formula 3 Championship (2021–2022)	None
(Estonia) Jüri Vips	2018–2022	FIA Formula 3 Championship (2019); Super Formula Championship (2019); Formula Regional European Championship (2020); FIA Formula 2 Championship (2020–2022)	None
(Norway) Dennis Hauger	2018–2023	F4 British Championship (2018); **Italian F4 Championship** (**2019**); ADAC Formula 4 Championship (2019); Euroformula Open Championship (2019); **FIA Formula 3 Championship** (2020–**2021**); Porsche Carrera Cup Scandinavia (2020, 2022–2023); Formula Regional European Championship (2020); FIA Formula 2 Championship (2022–2023)	None
(Austria) Lucas Auer	2019	Super Formula Championship (2019)	None
(Mexico) Patricio O'Ward	2019	IndyCar Series (2019); FIA Formula 2 Championship (2019); Super Formula Championship (2019)	None
(Brazil) Igor Fraga	2020	FIA Formula 3 Championship (2020)	None
(India) Jehan Daruvala	2020–2022	FIA Formula 2 Championship (2020–2022); F3 Asian Championship (2021)	None
(United States) Jak Crawford	2020–2023	Italian F4 Championship (2020); ADAC Formula 4 Championship (2020); FIA Formula 3 Championship (2021–2022); Formula Regional Asian Championship (2022); Formula Regional Middle East Championship (2023); FIA Formula 2 Championship (2023)	None
(Japan) Ayumu Iwasa	2021–2024	F3 Asian Championship (2021); FIA Formula 3 Championship (2021); FIA Formula 2 Championship (2022–2023); Super Formula Championship (2024)	None
(Mexico) Noel León	2022	Formula Regional European Championship (2022)	None
(Japan) Yuto Nomura	2022	French F4 Championship (2022)	None
(Japan) Ren Sato	2022	Super Formula Championship (2022)	None
(Japan) Souta Arao	2022–2023	French F4 Championship (2022); GB3 Championship (2023)	None
(Brazil) Enzo Fittipaldi	2023	FIA Formula 2 Championship (2023)	None
(Barbados) Zane Maloney	2023	FIA Formula 2 Championship (2023)	None
(Colombia) Sebastián Montoya	2023	FIA Formula 3 Championship (2023); Formula Regional Middle East Championship (2023); European Le Mans Series (2023)	None
(France) Enzo Deligny	2023–2024	F4 Spanish Championship (2023); Italian F4 Championship (2023); Formula 4 UAE Championship (2024); Formula Regional European Championship (2024)	None
(United States) James Egozi	2024	F4 Spanish Championship (2024)	None
(Poland) Kacper Sztuka	2024	FIA Formula 3 Championship (2024)	None
(Germany) Oliver Goethe	2024–2025	FIA Formula 3 Championship (2024); FIA Formula 2 Championship (2024–2025)	None
(Spain) Pepe Martí	2024–2025	FIA Formula 2 Championship (2024–2025)	None
(Germany) Tim Tramnitz	2024–2025	FIA Formula 3 Championship (2024–2025)	None
(France) Jules Caranta	2025	Eurocup-3 Spanish Winter Championship (2025); Eurocup-3 (2025)	None
(Lebanon) Christopher El Feghali	2025	Eurocup-4 Spanish Winter Championship (2025); F4 Spanish Championship (2025); Eurocup-3 (2025)	None
(Austria) Niklas Schaufler	2025	Eurocup-4 Spanish Winter Championship (2025); F4 Spanish Championship (2025)	None

- Championship titles highlighted in **bold**.

== American spin-off ==
Red Bull Driver Search was an American spin-off run from 2002 to 2005 in parallel with the Red Bull Junior Team. Its aim was "Searching for the future American F1 Champion". The winner was Scott Speed, who went on to compete in F1 from 2006–2007 for Toro Rosso.

== Red Bull Academy Programme ==
In 2024, Red Bull set up the Red Bull Academy Programme to support the team's F1 Academy drivers. F1 Academy was founded by the Formula One Group as a Formula 4–level racing series aimed at developing and preparing young female drivers to progress to higher levels of competition. In 2026, Alisha Palmowski became the first Red Bull Academy Programme driver to win the drivers' championship and graduate to the Red Bull Junior Team.

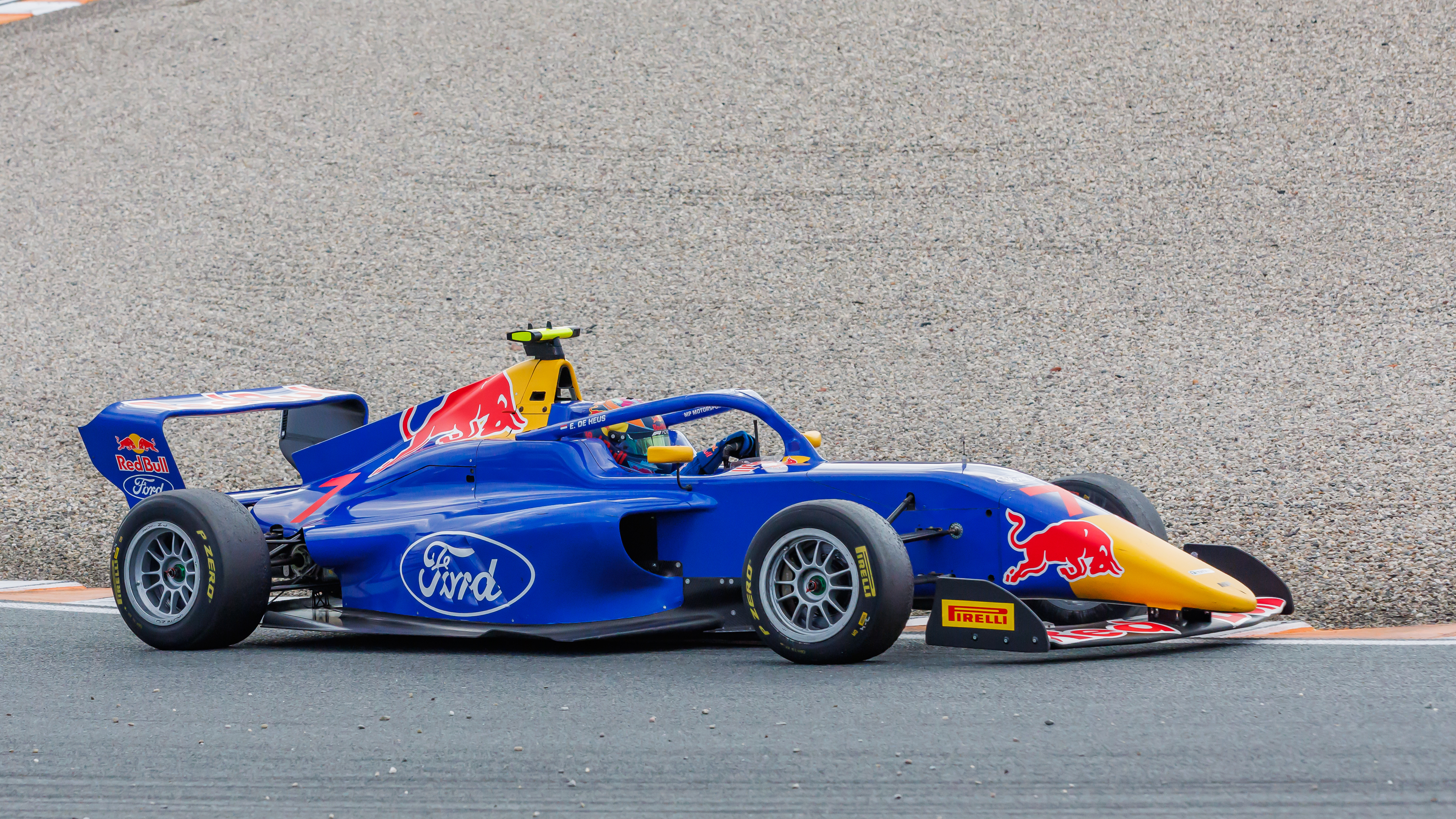
The Red Bull Ford–supported F1 Academy car in 2024.

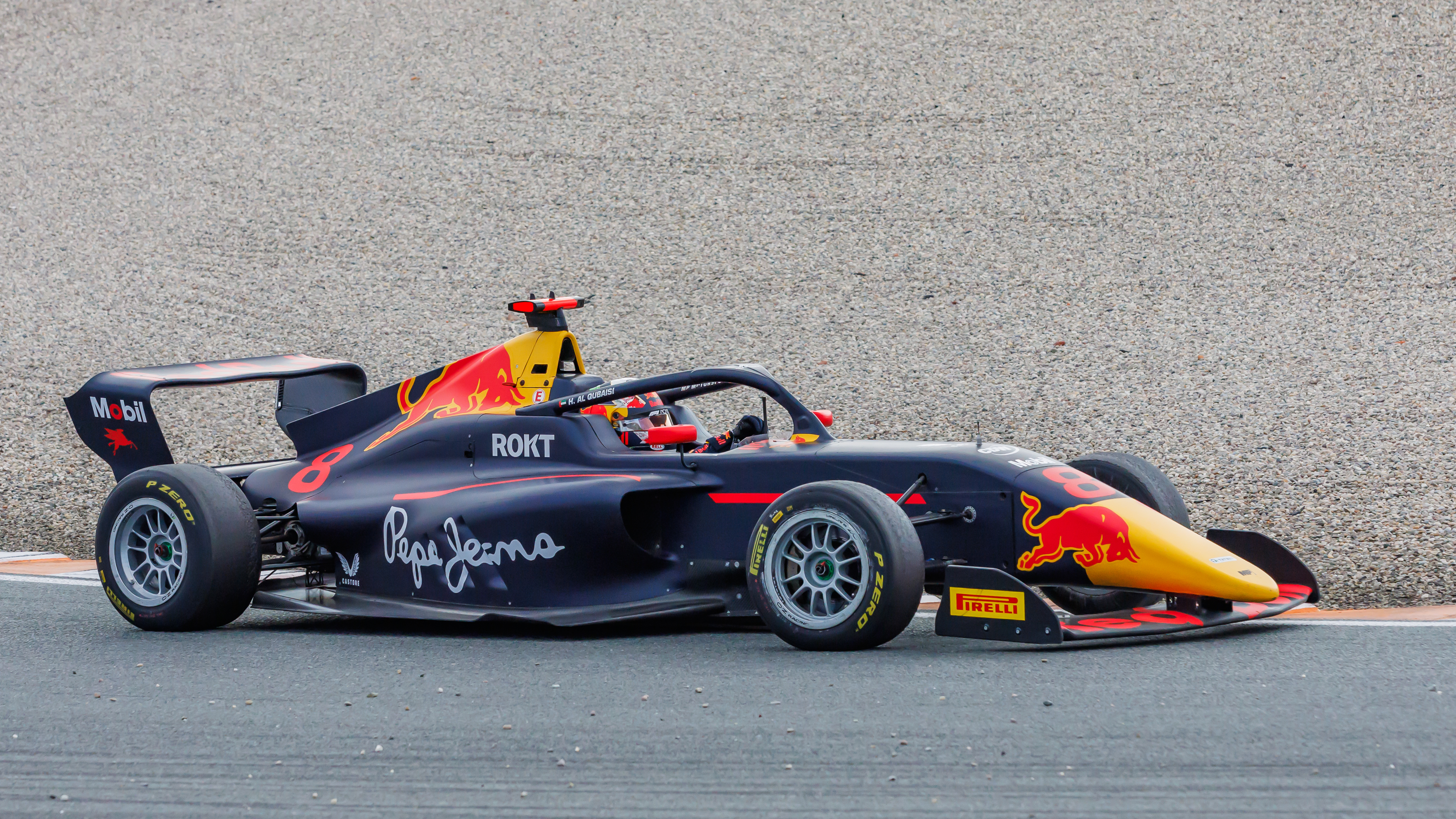
The Red Bull Racing–supported F1 Academy car in 2024.

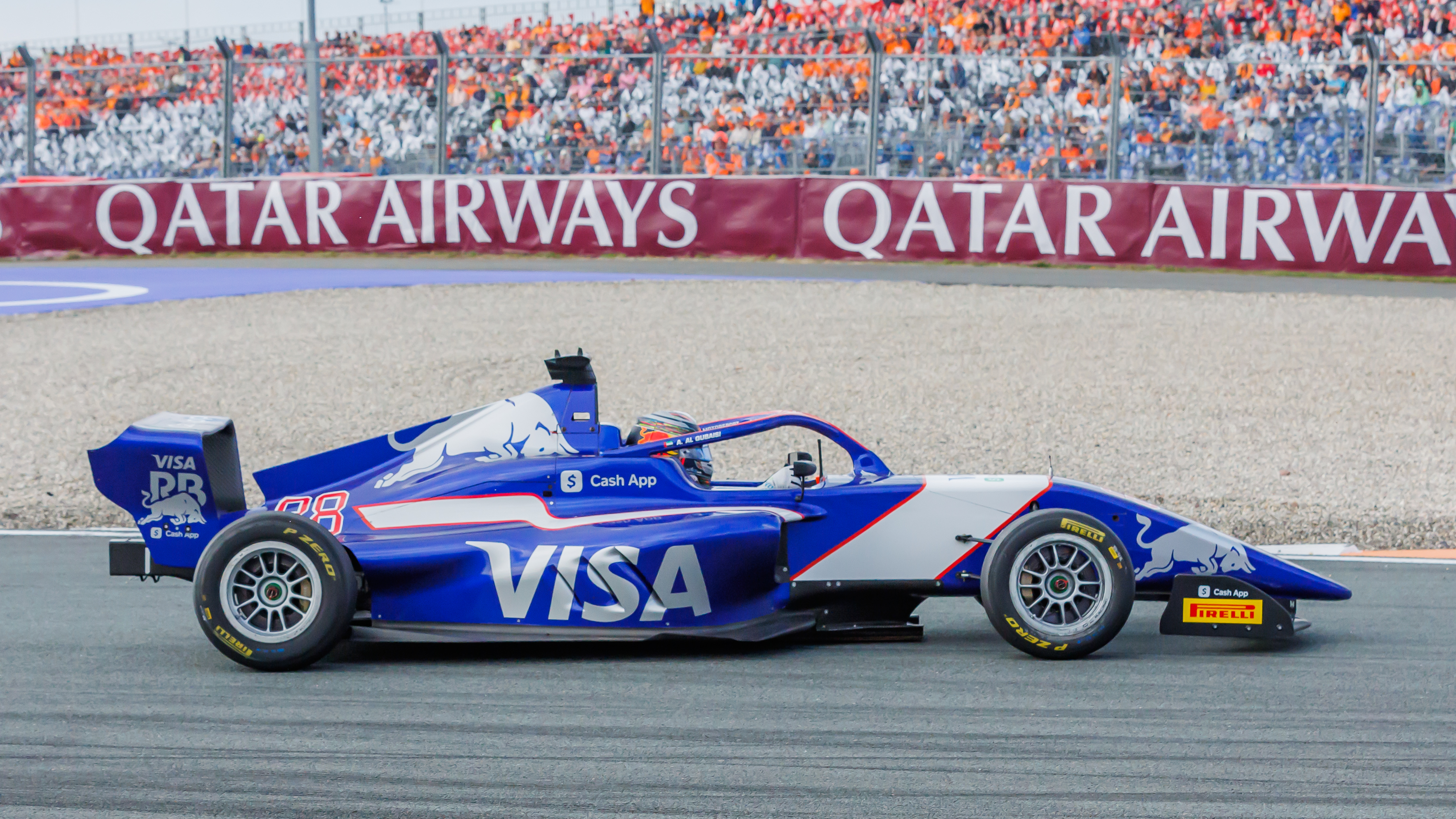
The RB–supported F1 Academy car in 2024.

The Racing Bulls–supported F1 Academy car in 2026.

Red Bull Academy Programme drivers
Driver	Years	Best pos.
(United Arab Emirates) Amna Al Qubaisi	2024	15th
(United Arab Emirates) Hamda Al Qubaisi	2024	5th
(Netherlands) Emely de Heus	2024	11th
(United States) Chloe Chambers	2025	3rd
(Brazil) Rafaela Ferreira	2025–2026	12th
(United Kingdom) Alisha Palmowski	2025–2026	1st

== Results ==
=== Formula 3000 ===
International Formula 3000 Championship Results
Year	Car	Drivers	Races	Wins	Poles	Fast laps	Points	D.C.	T.C.
1999	Lola B99/50-Zytek	(Brazil) Enrique Bernoldi	10	0	0	0	2	18th	?
1999	Lola B99/50-Zytek	(Austria) Markus Friesacher	3	0	0	0	0	NC	?
1999	Lola B99/50-Zytek	(Brazil) Ricardo Mauricio	7	0	0	0	1	22nd	?
2000	Lola B99/50-Zytek	(Brazil) Ricardo Mauricio	10	0	0	0	4	17th	9th
2000	Lola B99/50-Zytek	(Brazil) Enrique Bernoldi	10	0	0	0	5	16th	9th
2001	Lola B99/50-Zytek	(Austria) Patrick Friesacher	12	0	0	0	8	13th	5th
2001	Lola B99/50-Zytek	(Spain) Antonio García	4	0	0	0	0	NC	5th
2001	Lola B99/50-Zytek	(Brazil) Ricardo Mauricio	8	0	0	0	14	8th	5th
2002	Lola B02/50-Zytek	(Austria) Patrick Friesacher	12	0	0	0	14	10th	5th
2002	Lola B02/50-Zytek	(Brazil) Ricardo Mauricio	12	0	0	0	9	11th	5th
2003	Lola B02/50-Zytek	(Italy) Vitantonio Liuzzi	10	0	1	0	39	4th	2nd
2003	Lola B02/50-Zytek	(Austria) Patrick Friesacher	8	1	0	1	36	5th	2nd
2003	Lola B02/50-Zytek	(Austria) Bernhard Auinger	2	0	0	0	0	NC	2nd

- D.C. = Drivers' Championship position, T.C. = Teams' Championship position.

== See also ==
- Red Bull Racing
- Scuderia Toro Rosso
- Scuderia AlphaTauri
- Racing Bulls
