= Cyndie Allemann =

Swiss racing driver

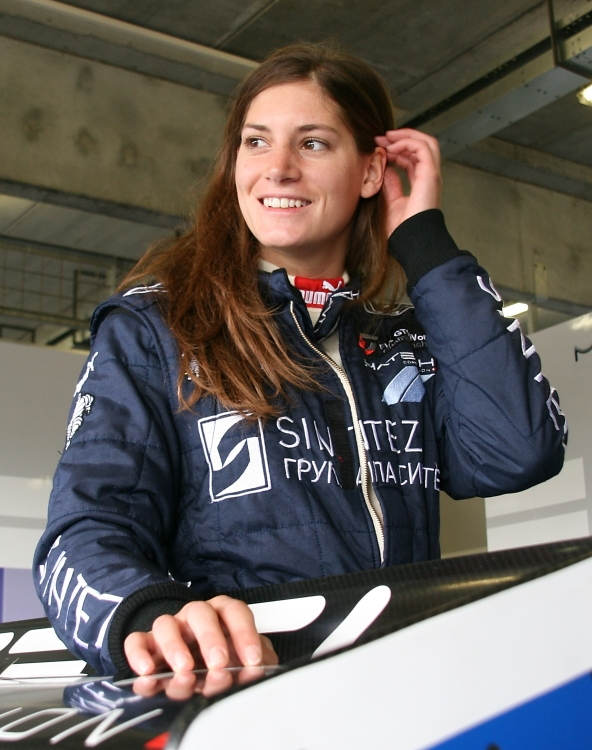
- Nationality: (Switzerland) Swiss
- Born: 4 April 1986 (age 40) Moutier, Switzerland

FIA GT1 World Championship career
- Debut season: 2010
- Current team: Matech Competition
- Categorisation: FIA Silver
- Car number: 6
- Starts: 0
- Wins: 0
- Poles: 0
- Fastest laps: 0

Previous series
- 2009 2008 2007 2006 2005 2005 2004: ADAC GT Masters; Firestone Indy Lights; Formula 3 Euro Series; Formel 3 Cup; Eurocup Formula Renault 2.0; Formula Renault 2.0 Germany; Renault Speed Trophy F2000

Championship titles
- 1999 1999–2000: CIK-FIA Green Helmet Trophy; Swiss Junior Kart Champion

Cyndie Allemann (born 4 April 1986 in Moutier) is a Swiss racing driver.

Allemann is the daughter of former Swiss karting champion Kurt Allemann and the sister of fellow racing driver Ken Allemann. After beginning her career in karting, she moved to cars in 2004 in Renault Speed Trophy F2000 and finished sixth. The next year she moved to the more highly regarded German championship for the same cars and finished twelfth. In 2006, she moved up to the Formel 3 Cup, finishing in ninth place and winning the pole position at EuroSpeedway Lausitz. The following year she drove in the Formula 3 Euro Series for British team Manor Motorsport racing a Dallara-Mercedes, but despite participating in all twenty races, failed to score points and was not classified in the season standings.

In 2008, Allemann signed to race in Firestone Indy Lights series for American Spirit Racing. She would go on to finish fourteenth in the final points standings with her best result being a fourth place in the second race at the Mid-Ohio Sports Course in July.

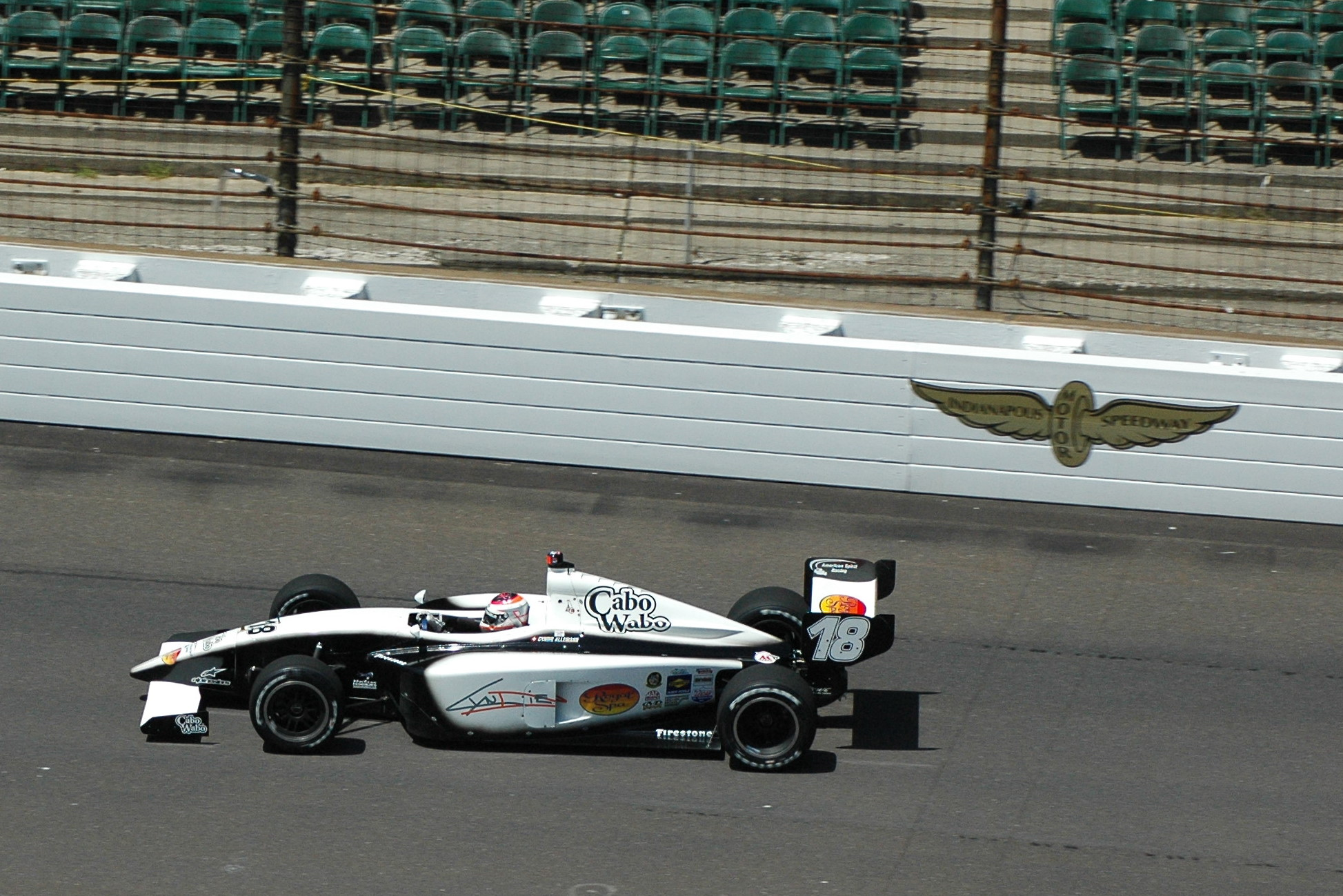
Allemann racing in the 2008 Firestone Freedom 100

For the 2010 season, Allemann teamed up with Natacha Gachnang and raced for the Swiss Matech team in a GT1 class Ford GT. Primarily racing in the FIA GT1 World Championship she also raced in the 2010 24 Hours of Le Mans.

Allemann drove for Hitotsuyama Racing using Audi R8 LMS in the 2012 Super GT season, in which she became the first female driver in Super GT series history (and third since 1997 including JGTC).

== Racing record ==
=== Career summary ===
Season	Series	Team	Races	Wins	Poles	F/Laps	Podiums	Points	Position
2004	Formula Renault 2000 Germany	Equipe Bernoise	4	0	0	0	0	12	37th
2004	Renault Speed Trophy F2000	Jenzer Motorsport	9	0	0	1	2	147	6th
2005	Formula Renault 2.0 Germany	SL Formula Racing	16	0	0	0	0	141	12th
2005	Eurocup Formula Renault 2.0	SL Formula Racing	14	0	0	0	0	0	43rd
2006	German Formula 3 Championship	Seyffarth Motorsport	20	0	1	0	2	30	9th
2007	Formula 3 Euro Series	Manor Motorsport	20	0	0	0	0	0	20th
2008	Indy Lights	American Spirit Racing	16	0	0	0	0	250	14th
2009	ADAC GT Masters	Buchbinder by Emotional Engineering	2	0	0	0	0	0	NC
2010	Le Mans Series - GT1	Matech Competition	1	0	0	0	1	13	7th
2010	24 Hours of Le Mans - GT1	Matech Competition	1	0	0	0	0	N/A	DNF
2010	FIA GT1 World Championship	Matech Competition	2	0	0	0	0	0	59th
2012	Malaysian Super Series - GT	Craft Eurasia Racing	2	1	0	0	2	51	**2nd**
2012	Super GT - GT300	Hitotsuyama Racing	5	0	0	0	0	2	23rd
2015	24H Series - A3T	Car Point S Racing Schmieglitz							

=== Complete Eurocup Formula Renault 2.0 results ===
(key) (Races in bold indicate pole position; races in italics indicate fastest lap)

Year	Entrant	1	2	3	4	5	6	7	8	9	10	11	12	13	14	15	16	DC	Points	Ref
2005	SL Formula Racing	ZOL; 1; 23	ZOL; 2 Ret	VAL; 1; 27	VAL; 2; 18	LMS; 1	LMS; 2	BIL; 1; 25	BIL; 2; 20	OSC; 1; 17	OSC; 2; 25	DON; 1; 20	DON; 2 Ret	EST; 1 Ret	EST; 2; 18	MNZ; 1; 22	MNZ; 2; 18	43rd	0	

=== Complete Formula 3 Euro Series results ===
(key) (Races in bold indicate pole position) (Races in italics indicate fastest lap)

Year	Entrant	Chassis	Engine	1	2	3	4	5	6	7	8	9	10	11	12	13	14	15	16	17	18	19	20	DC	Points
2007	Manor Motorsport	Dallara F306/035	Mercedes	HOC; 1; 15	HOC; 2; 18	BRH; 1 Ret	BRH; 2; 15	NOR; 1 Ret	NOR; 2 Ret	MAG; 1 Ret	MAG; 2 Ret	MUG; 1; 10	MUG; 2; 15	ZAN; 1; 12	ZAN; 2; 14	NÜR; 1; 17	NÜR; 2; 19	CAT; 1; 15	CAT; 2 Ret	NOG; 1; 20	NOG; 2; 16	HOC; 1; 19	HOC; 2 Ret	20th	0

=== American open–wheel results ===
(key)

==== Indy Lights ====
Year	Team	1	2	3	4	5	6	7	8	9	10	11	12	13	14	15	16	Rank	Points
2008	American Spirit Racing	HMS; 16	STP1; 8	STP2; 10	KAN; 22	INDY; 26	MIL; 18	IOW; 18	WGL1; 9	WGL2; 18	NSH; 13	MOH1; 17	MOH2; 4	KTY; 13	SNM1; 22	SNM2; 11	CHI; 14	**14th**	**250**

=== Complete GT1 World Championship results ===
Year	Team	Car	1	2	3	4	5	6	7	8	9	10	11	12	13	14	15	16	17	18	19	20	Pos	Points	Ref
2010	Matech Competition	Ford	ABU; QR; DNS	ABU; CR; DNS	SIL; QR	SIL; CR	BRN; QR; 22	BRN; CR; 18	PRI; QR	PRI; CR	SPA; QR	SPA; CR	NÜR; QR	NÜR; CR	ALG; QR	ALG; CR	NAV; QR	NAV; CR	INT; QR	INT; CR	SAN; QR	SAN; CR	59th	0	

=== 24 Hours of Le Mans results ===
Year	Team	Co-Drivers	Car	Class	Laps	Pos.	Class Pos.
2010	(Switzerland) Matech Competition	(Switzerland) Natacha Gachnang (Switzerland) Rahel Frey	Ford GT1	GT1	59	DNF	DNF

=== Complete Super GT results ===
Year	Team	Car	Class	1	2	3	4	5	6	7	8	DC	Pts
2012	Hitotsuyama Racing	Audi R8 LMS	GT300	OKA; 9	FUJ; 15	SEP; 14	SUG; Ret	SUZ; 14	FUJ	AUT	MOT	23rd	2
