= 2004 Formula Renault 2000 Germany =

Motor racing championship

Seasons
- ← 2003 2005 →

The 2004 Formula Renault 2000 Germany season was the thirteenth Formula Renault 2000 Germany season. The season began at Oschersleben on 8 May and finished on 9 October at the same venue, after fourteen races.

Motopark Oschersleben driver Scott Speed won four races on his way to championship title. His compatriot Colin Fleming of the Jenzer Motorsport won races at Salzburgring and Lausitz. Michael Ammermüller completed the top 3 without winning a race. The same number of wins as the champion had Pascal Kochem, who finished fourth. Other wins were shared between Frank Kechele, Reinhard Kofler and Pekka Saarinen, who finished sixth, seventh and eighth respectively.

== Drivers and teams ==
2004 Entry List
Team	No.	Driver name	Rounds
(Germany) MD Motorsport	2	(Germany) Marco Dürr	All
(Finland) Novorace Oy	3	(Finland) Miikka Honkanen	1–4
(Finland) Novorace Oy	15	(Finland) Mika Leirilaakso	All
(Finland) Novorace Oy	45	(Finland) Henri Niskanen	5–7
(Germany) Motopark Oschersleben	4	(Germany) Dominik Weigl	All
(Germany) Motopark Oschersleben	5	(Germany) Frank Kechele	All
(Germany) Motopark Oschersleben	41	(United States) Scott Speed	All
(Germany) Best Motorsport	6	(Germany) Patric Filutowicz	1–6
(Germany) Best Motorsport	20	(Germany) Andreas Ziggel	All
(Germany) Kern Motorsport	7	(Germany) Bruno Rudolf Fechner	All
(Denmark) Team Aarhus Racing	8	(Denmark) Jesper Wulff Laurens	1
(Denmark) Team Aarhus Racing	9	(Denmark) Steffen Møller	1, 3
(Denmark) Team Aarhus Racing	32	(Czech Republic) Milan Matejcek	1–3
(Switzerland) Jenzer Motorsport	10	(Germany) Pascal Kochem	All
(Switzerland) Jenzer Motorsport	11	(Germany) Michael Ammermüller	All
(Switzerland) Jenzer Motorsport	12	(United States) Colin Fleming	All
(Denmark) Team Formula Sport	16	(Denmark) Kasper Andersen	1–2, 5
(Germany) SL Formula Racing	14	(Finland) Pekka Saarinen	All
(Germany) SL Formula Racing	17	(Germany) Philipp Wlazik	All
(Germany) SL Formula Racing	26	(Germany) Dima Raihklin	All
(Germany) SL Formula Racing	47	(Japan) Takuya Izawa	6
(Russia) Lukoil Racing Team	18	(Russia) Yuri Baiborodov	All
(Russia) Lukoil Racing Team	19	(Russia) Mikhail Aleshin	All
(Germany) Julian Theobald	21	(Germany) Julian Theobald	1–6
(Germany) Rhein-Ahr Racing	22	(Austria) Siegfried Perchtold	1–3
(Germany) Rhein-Ahr Racing	23	(Hungary) Barna Paár	All
(Italy) J.D. Motorsport	24	(United States) Dominique Claessens	1–6
(Italy) J.D. Motorsport	25	(Austria) Reinhard Kofler	1–6
(Italy) Prema Powerteam	29	(United Kingdom) Ben Clucas	5
(Italy) Prema Powerteam	30	(Japan) Kohei Hirate	5
(Italy) Prema Powerteam	31	(Japan) Kamui Kobayashi	5
(Switzerland) Equipe Bernoise	34	(Switzerland) Cyndie Allemann	3, 5
(Switzerland) Equipe Bernoise	35	(Switzerland) David Oberle	3, 5–6
(Germany) Kenny Weiss	36	(Germany) Kenny Weiss	3–7
(Germany) Conrad Racing	37	(Switzerland) Sandro Manuzzi	3
(France) PlayStation Junior Team Oreca	39	(France) Nicolas Prost	5
(France) PlayStation Junior Team Oreca	40	(France) Laurent Groppi	5
(Netherlands) Van Amersfoort Racing	42	(Netherlands) Carlo van Dam	6–7
(Netherlands) Van Amersfoort Racing	43	(Netherlands) Renger van der Zande	6–7
(Sweden) Max Racing	44	(Sweden) Max Nilsson	5–7
(Germany) Bernd Deuling	46	(Germany) Bernd Deuling	5–7

== Race calendar and results ==
Round		Circuit	Date	Pole position	Fastest lap	Winning driver	Winning team
1	R1	(Germany) Motopark Oschersleben	8 May	(Russia) Mikhail Aleshin	(Germany) Pascal Kochem	(Germany) Pascal Kochem	(Switzerland) Jenzer Motorsport
1	R2	(Germany) Motopark Oschersleben	9 May	(Germany) Michael Ammermüller	(United States) Scott Speed	(United States) Scott Speed	(Germany) Motopark Oschersleben
2	R1	(Netherlands) TT Circuit Assen	22 May	(Finland) Pekka Saarinen	(Germany) Michael Ammermüller	(Finland) Pekka Saarinen	(Germany) SL Formula Racing
2	R2	(Netherlands) TT Circuit Assen	23 May	(Germany) Pascal Kochem	(Germany) Pascal Kochem	(United States) Scott Speed	(Germany) Motopark Oschersleben
3	R1	(Austria) Salzburgring	10 July	(United States) Colin Fleming	(Denmark) Jesper Wulff Laurens	(United States) Colin Fleming	(Switzerland) Jenzer Motorsport
3	R2	(Austria) Salzburgring	11 July	(United States) Colin Fleming	(United States) Colin Fleming	(United States) Colin Fleming	(Switzerland) Jenzer Motorsport
4	R1	(Germany) Sachsenring	14 August	(Germany) Pascal Kochem	(Germany) Pascal Kochem	(Germany) Pascal Kochem	(Switzerland) Jenzer Motorsport
4	R2	(Germany) Sachsenring	15 August	(Russia) Mikhail Aleshin	(United States) Colin Fleming	(United States) Scott Speed	(Germany) Motopark Oschersleben
5	R1	(Germany) Nürburgring	28 August	(Germany) Pascal Kochem	(Russia) Mikhail Aleshin	(Germany) Pascal Kochem	(Switzerland) Jenzer Motorsport
5	R2	(Germany) Nürburgring	29 August	(United States) Scott Speed	(Germany) Michael Ammermüller	(Austria) Reinhard Kofler	(Italy) J.D. Motorsport
6	R1	(Germany) EuroSpeedway Lausitz	11 September	(Germany) Pascal Kochem	(United States) Colin Fleming	(United States) Colin Fleming	(Switzerland) Jenzer Motorsport
6	R2	(Germany) EuroSpeedway Lausitz	12 September	(Germany) Pascal Kochem	(Austria) Reinhard Kofler	(Germany) Pascal Kochem	(Switzerland) Jenzer Motorsport
7	R1	(Germany) Motopark Oschersleben	9 October	(United States) Scott Speed	(Germany) Frank Kechele	(Germany) Frank Kechele	(Germany) Motopark Oschersleben
7	R2	(Germany) Motopark Oschersleben	10 October	(United States) Scott Speed	(United States) Scott Speed	(United States) Scott Speed	(Germany) Motopark Oschersleben

== Standings ==
- Point system : 30, 24, 20, 17, 16, 15, 14, 13, 12, 11, 10, 9, 8, 7, 6, 5, 4, 3, 2, 1 for 20th. No points for Fastest lap or Pole position.

Pos	Driver name	OSC (Germany)		ASS (Netherlands)		SAL (Austria)		SAC (Germany)		NÜR (Germany)		LAU (Germany)		OSC (Germany)		Points
Pos	Driver name	1	2	3	4	5	6	7	8	9	10	11	12	13	14	Points
1	(United States) Scott Speed	18	1	3	1	2	2	2	1	3	Ret	2	8	3	1	293
2	(United States) Colin Fleming	11	10	2	3	1	1	4	4	5	3	1	7	2	3	284
3	(Germany) Michael Ammermüller	2	14	7	6	5	6	13	3	2	4	4	3	5	2	238
4	(Germany) Pascal Kochem	1	Ret	6	2	3	3	1	15	1	15	8	1	20	18	208
5	(Russia) Mikhail Aleshin	3	15	12	7	4	5	17	2	10	2	Ret	6	6	13	185
6	(Germany) Frank Kechele	5	Ret	8	8	8	Ret	6	11	7	8	6	4	1	Ret	169
7	(Austria) Reinhard Kofler	19	12	4	4	18	4	3	12	4	1	3	22			164
8	(Finland) Pekka Saarinen	17	2	1	5	14	Ret	7	14	8	12	Ret	2	18	Ret	151
9	(Denmark) Jesper Wulff Laurens	6	3	10	10	10	14	10	7	Ret	10	10	15	19	9	143
10	(United States) Dominique Claessens	4	18	5	9	7	19	8	9	9	11	5	11			137
11	(Germany) Bruno Rudolf Fechner	7	13	Ret	DNS	9	9	5	DSQ	Ret	18	9	12	7	16	105
12	(Finland) Mika Leirilaakso	Ret	8	Ret	14	Ret	11	15	8	Ret	DNS	7	10	8	4	104
13	(Germany) Marco Dürr	16	5	11	13	17	8	21	Ret	21	23	16	13	10	8	93
14	(Hungary) Barna Paár	10	7	13	15	13	20	14	6	22	16	12	20	15	Ret	92
15	(Germany) Dima Raihklin	Ret	11	18	11	16	DNS	16	Ret	14	9	Ret	16	4	6	89
16	(Germany) Andreas Ziggel	9	Ret	17	17	Ret	Ret	12	5	Ret	21	11	17	16	7	78
17	(Germany) Kenny Weiss					11	Ret	9	10	19	19	13	14	12	12	70
18	(Germany) Patric Filutowicz	12	9	15	12	22	12	Ret	13	16	Ret	15	18			67
19	(Germany) Philipp Wlazik	8	16	9	19	24	Ret	20	Ret	12	17	Ret	Ret	14	15	59
20	(Russia) Yuri Baibodorov	13	19	14	Ret	Ret	10	18	Ret	20	27	Ret	Ret	11	10	53
21	(Denmark) Steffen Møller	15	6			19	7									37
22	(Switzerland) Sandro Manuzzi					6	6									30
23	(Denmark) Kasper Andersen	Ret	4	Ret	20					18	13					29
24	(France) Laurent Groppi									6	7					29
25	(Japan) Kohei Hirate									11	6					25
26	(Netherlands) Renger van der Zande											Ret	22	13	5	24
27	(Sweden) Max Nilsson									24	24	Ret	9	21	11	23
28	(Germany) Julian Theobald	Ret	Ret	19	16	13	17	Ret	DNS	23	22	18	23			22
29	(Germany) Dominik Weigl	Ret	17	16	21	23	Ret	11	Ret	Ret	28	Ret	Ret	Ret	Ret	19
30	(Netherlands) Carlo van Dam											19	DSQ	9	17	18
31	(Japan) Kamui Kobayashi									Ret	5					16
32	(Finland) Miikka Honkanen	Ret	20	Ret	DNS	15	14	19	Ret							16
33	(United Kingdom) Ben Clucas									13	14					15
34	(Finland) Henri Niskanen									25	26	17	Ret	17	14	15
35	(Austria) Siegfried Perchtold	14	Ret	20	Ret	20	16									14
36	(Japan) Takuya Izawa										20	10				12
37	(Switzerland) Cyndie Allemann					25	15			15	Ret					12
38	(Switzerland) David Oberle					Ret	Ret			Ret	25	14	Ret			7
39	(Czech Republic) Milan Matejcek	Ret	Ret	Ret	18	21	18									6
40	(France) Nicolas Prost									17	14					5
41	(Germany) Bernd Deuling											21	19			2
Pos	Driver name	OSC (Germany)		ASS (Netherlands)		SAL (Austria)		SAC (Germany)		NÜR (Germany)		LAU (Germany)		OSC (Germany)		Points
