= Atte Mustonen =

Finnish racing driver

- Nationality: (Finland) Finnish
- Born: 16 September 1988 (age 38) Heinola, Finland
- Retired: 2009

Formula 3 Euro Series
- Years active: 2009
- Teams: Motopark Academy
- Starts: 12
- Wins: 0
- Poles: 0
- Fastest laps: 0
- Best finish: 19th in 2009

Previous series
- 2007–08 2006 2005–06 2005 2005: British F3; Formula Renault 2.0 NEC; Eurocup Formula Renault 2.0; Formula Renault 2.0 Germany; FR2.0 Italia Winter Series

Championship titles
- 2005: FR2.0 Italia Winter Series

Atte Mustonen (born 16 September 1988 in Heinola, Finland), is a Finnish former motor racing driver.

== Motorsport career ==
Like many aspiring motor racing drivers, Mustonen began his career with kart racing at the age of 11. By 2002, his talent became evident when he won the ICA Junior Karting Championship in Finland, and successfully retained his title in 2003. The two back-to-back victories helped him to be named Finnish Karting Driver of the Year in 2003.

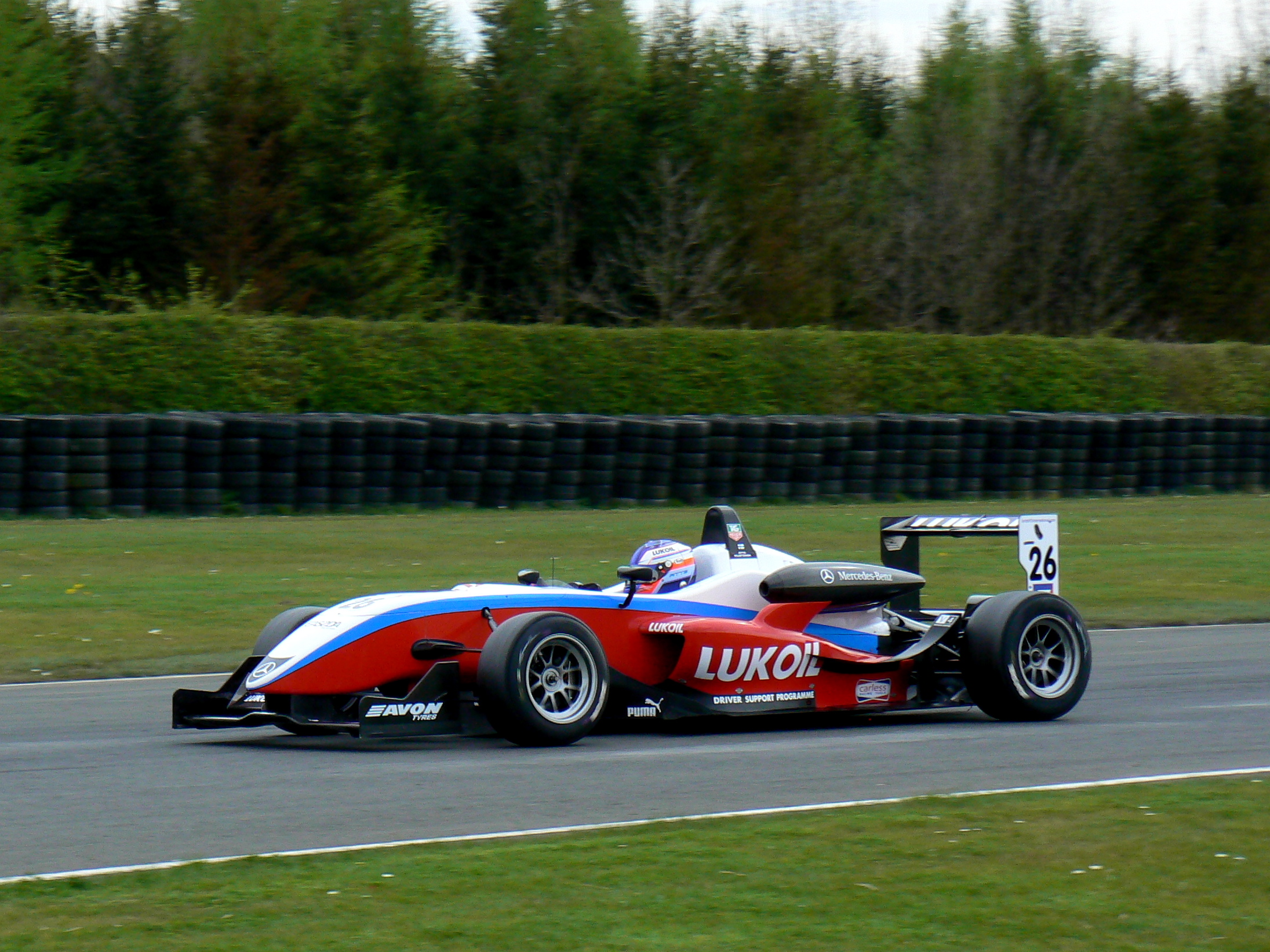
Mustonen driving for Räikkönen Robertson Racing at the Croft round of the 2008 British Formula 3 season.

The following year, 2004, was pivotal in Mustonen's career, with him winning the Finnish Formula A Championship and being named Finnish Karting Driver of the Year once again. He also competed in the Winter, Constructor and Pomposa International Cups, where he registered on the international radar for the sport.

In 2005, Mustonen transferred to the Italian FR 2.0 Winter Trophy, which he won. The following year, he competed in the European version, where he registered a few podiums in another successful season.

Mustonen was signed by Räikkönen Robertson Racing for the 2007 British Formula 3 Championship, as a teammate in the Championship class to Jonathan Kennard and Stephen Jelley. He impressed with his fast but often erratic races, not uncommon for a young racing driver. He broke the lap record at Snetterton, and achieved his first victory of the season in race two at the Thruxton round of the championship. He ended the year ranked seventh in the overall standings.

Mustonen returned for a second season in 2008, but had a largely uneventful season. A win at Rockingham was the only major highlight, as he ended up sixth in the championship, losing out on fifth to Marcus Ericsson in the final round.

Mustonen moved to the Formula Three Euroseries for the 2009 season, driving for the Motopark Academy team alongside Christopher Zanella. Mustonen missed the rounds at Oschersleben due to health problems, and was replaced by Renger van der Zande. Mustonen returned for the rounds at the Nürburgring and Brands Hatch, before van der Zande returned to replace him from Barcelona onwards.

== Racing record ==
=== Career summary ===
Season	Series	Team	Races	Wins	Poles	F/Laps	Podiums	Points	Position
2005	Formula Renault 2.0 Germany	Novorace Oy	16	1	1	2	2	156	9th
2005	Eurocup Formula Renault 2.0	Koiranen Bros. Motorsport	10	0	0	0	0	13	20th
2005	Formula Renault 2.0 Italia Winter Series	Koiranen Bros. Motorsport	4	1	0	0	3	44	**1st**
2006	Formula Renault 2.0 NEC	Koiranen Bros. Motorsport	12	0	0	1	2	149	11th
2006	Eurocup Formula Renault 2.0	Koiranen Bros. Motorsport	14	0	0	1	2	54	9th
2006	Eurocup Formula Renault 2.0	Jenzer Motorsport	14	0	0	1	2	54	9th
2007	British Formula 3 Championship	Räikkönen Robertson Racing	22	1	2	1	5	126	7th
2007	Masters of Formula 3	Räikkönen Robertson Racing	1	0	0	0	0	N/A	11th
2007	Macau Grand Prix	Signature-Plus	1	0	0	0	0	N/A	NC
2008	British Formula 3 International Series	Räikkönen Robertson Racing	22	1	0	0	5	126	6th
2008	Masters of Formula 3	Räikkönen Robertson Racing	1	0	0	0	0	N/A	6th
2008	Macau Grand Prix	Räikkönen Robertson Racing	1	0	0	0	0	N/A	18th
2009	Formula 3 Euro Series	Motopark Academy	12	0	0	0	0	4	19th
2009	Masters of Formula 3	Motopark Academy	1	0	0	0	0	N/A	NC

=== Complete Eurocup Formula Renault 2.0 results ===
(key) (Races in bold indicate pole position; races in italics indicate fastest lap)

Year	Entrant	1	2	3	4	5	6	7	8	9	10	11	12	13	14	15	16	DC	Points
2005	Koiranen Bros. Motorsport	ZOL; 1; 22	ZOL; 2; 30	VAL; 1; 19	VAL; 2; 21	LMS; 1	LMS; 2	BIL; 1; 7	BIL; 2 Ret	OSC; 1; 8	OSC; 2; 13	DON; 1; 6	DON; 2 Ret	EST; 1	EST; 2	MNZ; 1	MNZ; 2	20th	13
2006	Koiranen Bros. Motorsport	ZOL; 1; 4	ZOL; 2; 5	IST; 1; 3	IST; 2; 2	MIS; 1 Ret	MIS; 2 Ret	NÜR; 1; 16	NÜR; 2; 16									9th	54
2006	Jenzer Motorsport									DON; 1; 9	DON; 2; 20	LMS; 1; 9	LMS; 2; 5	CAT; 1; 17	CAT; 2; 11			9th	54

=== Complete Formula Renault 2.0 NEC results ===
(key) (Races in bold indicate pole position) (Races in italics indicate fastest lap)

Year	Entrant	1	2	3	4	5	6	7	8	9	10	11	12	13	14	15	16	DC	Points
2006	Koiranen Bros. Motorsport	OSC; 1; 4	OSC; 2; 5	SPA; 1; 7	SPA; 2; 14	NÜR; 1; 10	NÜR; 2; 6	ZAN; 1; 5	ZAN; 2; 7	OSC; 1; 3	OSC; 2; 3	ASS; 1	ASS; 2	AND; 1 Ret	AND; 2 Ret	SAL; 1	SAL; 2	11th	149

Sporting positions
Preceded by Mikhail Aleshin	Italian Formula Renault 2.0 Winter Series; Champion; 2005	Succeeded by Jaime Alguersuari
