= 2004 Formula Renault 2000 Eurocup =

Motor racing competition

Seasons
- ← 2003 2005 →

The 2004 Formula Renault 2000 Eurocup season was the fourteenth Eurocup Formula Renault 2.0 season. The season began at Monza on 27 March and finished at Oschersleben on 18 September, after seventeen races.

American driver Scott Speed scored eight victories at Hockenheimring, Brno, Circuit de Spa-Francorchamps, Imola and Oschersleben during the season. He took the championship with a round to spare at the wheel of his Motopark Academy-run car, giving team based at Oschersleben their first Eurocup championship after double win on fellow circuit. Second place was not resolved until the final round, as Graff Racing's Simon Pagenaud and Jenzer Motorsport's Colin Fleming battled over the placing. Despite that Fleming was ahead of Pagenaud in both races of final round and scored more points, the French driver became runner-up.

JD Motorsport's Reinhard Kofler took fourth place with one victory at Valencia and took three further podium finishes to confirm fourth. Fleming's team-mate Pascal Kochem won race at Imola and completed the top-five. Cram Competition's Pastor Maldonado won both races in opening round at Monza on his way to eighth place. Other races were won by French drivers Patrick Pilet and Yann Clairay who completed the top-ten. Guest Formula Renault 2000 UK driver Mike Conway claimed win at Donington Park.

== Teams and drivers ==
2004 Entry List
Team	No.	Driver name	Rounds
(Italy) Cram Competition	1	(Brazil) Marcello Thomaz	1-3
(Italy) Cram Competition	2	(Mexico) Salvador Durán	1-5, 7-9
(Italy) Cram Competition	3	(Venezuela) Pastor Maldonado	1-5, 7-9
(Italy) Cram Competition	27	(Italy) Davide Valsecchi	1-4, 7-8
(Germany) Motopark Academy	4	(Germany) Marc Walz	1-5
(Germany) Motopark Academy	4	(Belgium) Mike den Tandt	7
(Germany) Motopark Academy	4	(Germany) Dominik Weigl	6, 9
(Germany) Motopark Academy	14	(Germany) Dominik Weigl	5
(Germany) Motopark Academy	14	(Netherlands) Junior Strous	1-5, 7-9
(Germany) Motopark Academy	5	(Germany) Frank Kechele	1
(Germany) Motopark Academy	5	(Argentina) Matías Milla	9
(Germany) Motopark Academy	41	(United States) Scott Speed	All
(France) Graff Racing	6	(Belgium) Jérôme d'Ambrosio	1-3, 7
(France) Graff Racing	9	(France) Julien Canal	All
(France) Graff Racing	22	(France) Johan Charpilienne	1-3
(France) Graff Racing	23	(France) Patrick Pilet	1, 3, 6-7, 9
(France) Graff Racing	28	(France) Simon Pagenaud	All
(Netherlands) AR Motorsport	7	(Netherlands) Paul Meijer	All
(Netherlands) AR Motorsport	8	(Netherlands) Yelmer Buurman	1-4, 6-9
(Netherlands) AR Motorsport	20	(Netherlands) Xavier Maassen	2, 4, 6-7, 9
(Switzerland) Jenzer Motorsport	10	(Germany) Pascal Kochem	All
(Switzerland) Jenzer Motorsport	11	(Germany) Michael Ammermüller	All
(Switzerland) Jenzer Motorsport	12	(United States) Colin Fleming	All
(Finland) Koiranen Motorsport	15	(Finland) Mika Leirilaakso	All
(Finland) Koiranen Motorsport	63	(Finland) Miikka Honkanen	9
(France) Tech 1 Racing	16	(France) Franck Mailleux	1-3, 9
(France) Tech 1 Racing	17	(France) Ludovic Badey	1-3, 7
(Russia) Lukoil Racing Team	18	(Russia) Yuri Baiborodov	All
(Russia) Lukoil Racing Team	19	(Russia) Mikhail Aleshin	All
(United Kingdom) Team AKA	21	(United Kingdom) James Jakes	1-4, 6-7, 9
(United Kingdom) Team AKA	40	(United Kingdom) Andrew Kirkaldy	7
(United Kingdom) Team AKA	59	(Peru) Juan Manuel Polar	9
(Italy) JD Motorsport	24	(United States) Dominique Claessens	All
(Italy) JD Motorsport	25	(Austria) Reinhard Kofler	All
(Italy) JD Motorsport	26	(Brazil) Patrick Rocha	1-7
(France) SG Formula	29	(France) Guillaume Moreau	1-3, 6-7
(France) SG Formula	36	(Switzerland) Romain Grosjean	1-3, 7, 9
(France) SG Formula	37	(France) Yann Clairay	1-3, 7, 9
(France) SG Formula	54	(France) Pierre Ragues	7, 9
(Italy) Euronova Racing	30	(Italy) Luca Frigerio	1
(Italy) Euronova Racing	30	(Italy) Gary Cester	4, 7
(Italy) Euronova Racing	31	(Italy) Luca Filippi	1, 4, 7-9
(Italy) Euronova Racing	32	(Russia) Vitaly Petrov	1, 4
(Italy) Uboldi Corse	33	(Italy) Luigi Ferrara	4, 8
(Italy) Uboldi Corse	34	(Italy) Giacomo Vargiu	2, 4
(Italy) Uboldi Corse	35	(Italy) Riccardo Cinti	1-4
(Italy) Uboldi Corse	45	(Italy) Massimo Torre	4
(France) Green Racing	38	(France) Ulric Amado de Carvalho	3, 7
(France) Green Racing	39	(France) Malo Olivier	3
(France) Green Racing	39	(France) Cedric Valdevit	7
(Germany) Kern Motorsport	42	(Germany) Bruno Rudolf Fechner	4, 9
(Germany) Kern Motorsport	60	(Germany) Kenny Weiss	9
(Germany) Conrad Racing	43	(Germany) Thomas Conrad	4
(Germany) Böhm Motorsport	44	(Germany) Marco Dürr	4
(United Kingdom) Fortec Motorsport	46	(United Kingdom) Mike Conway	6
(United Kingdom) Fortec Motorsport	47	(United Kingdom) Stuart Hall	6
(United Kingdom) Fortec Motorsport	52	(United Kingdom) Charles Hollings	6
(United Kingdom) Manor Motorsport	48	(Republic of Ireland) Patrick Hogan	6-7
(United Kingdom) Manor Motorsport	49	(United Kingdom) Josh Weber	6-7
(United Kingdom) Manor Motorsport	50	(United Kingdom) Paul di Resta	6-7
(France) CD Sport	53	(France) Jean-Francis Gagneraud	7
(Italy) BVM Racing	55	(Italy) Luca Persiani	8
(Italy) BVM Racing	56	(Italy) Frederico Muggia	8
(Italy) BVM Racing	57	(Italy) Andrea Ceccato	8
(Italy) Bicar Racing	58	(Italy) Cristian Corsini	8
(Germany) SL Formula Racing	61	(Finland) Pekka Saarinen	9
(Germany) SL Formula Racing	62	(Germany) Dima Raikhlin	9

== Calendar ==
All races were part of LG Super Racing Weekends, that also included FIA GT Championship and Formula Renault V6 Eurocup.

Round		Circuit	Date	Pole position	Fastest lap	Winning driver	Winning team
1	R1	(Italy) Autodromo Nazionale Monza	27 March	(United States) Scott Speed	(Venezuela) Pastor Maldonado	(Venezuela) Pastor Maldonado	(Italy) Cram Competition
1	R2	(Italy) Autodromo Nazionale Monza	27 March	(United States) Scott Speed	(United States) Scott Speed	(Venezuela) Pastor Maldonado	(Italy) Cram Competition
2	R1	(Spain) Circuit Ricardo Tormo, Valencia	17 April	(France) Guillaume Moreau	(United States) Scott Speed	(France) Simon Pagenaud	(France) Graff Racing
2	R2	(Spain) Circuit Ricardo Tormo, Valencia	17 April	(France) Simon Pagenaud	(United States) Scott Speed	(Austria) Reinhard Kofler	(Italy) JD Motorsport
3	R1	(France) Circuit de Nevers Magny-Cours	1 May	(France) Yann Clairay	(France) Simon Pagenaud	(France) Yann Clairay	(France) SG Formula
3	R2	(France) Circuit de Nevers Magny-Cours	1 May	(France) Simon Pagenaud	(France) Simon Pagenaud	(France) Simon Pagenaud	(France) Graff Racing
4	R1	(Germany) Hockenheimring	15 May	(United States) Scott Speed	(Germany) Pascal Kochem	(United States) Scott Speed	(Germany) Motopark Academy
4	R2	(Germany) Hockenheimring	15 May	(United States) Colin Fleming	(United States) Colin Fleming	(United States) Scott Speed	(Germany) Motopark Academy
5	R1	(Czech Republic) Masaryk Circuit, Brno	29 May	(United States) Scott Speed	(Germany) Pascal Kochem	(United States) Scott Speed	(Germany) Motopark Academy
5	R2	(Czech Republic) Masaryk Circuit, Brno	29 May	(United States) Scott Speed	(United States) Scott Speed	(United States) Scott Speed	(Germany) Motopark Academy
6	R1	(United Kingdom) Donington Park	26 June	(United States) Scott Speed	(France) Patrick Pilet	(France) Patrick Pilet	(France) Graff Racing
6	R2	(United Kingdom) Donington Park	26 June	(United States) Colin Fleming	(France) Guillaume Moreau	(United Kingdom) Mike Conway	(United Kingdom) Fortec Motorsport
7		(Belgium) Circuit de Spa-Francorchamps	31 July	(United States) Scott Speed	(United States) Scott Speed	(United States) Scott Speed	(Germany) Motopark Academy
8	R1	(Italy) Autodromo Enzo e Dino Ferrari, Imola	4 September	(Germany) Pascal Kochem	(Germany) Pascal Kochem	(Germany) Pascal Kochem	(Switzerland) Jenzer Motorsport
8	R2	(Italy) Autodromo Enzo e Dino Ferrari, Imola	4 September	(Germany) Pascal Kochem	(United States) Scott Speed	(United States) Scott Speed	(Germany) Motopark Academy
9	R1	(Germany) Motorsport Arena Oschersleben	18 September	(United States) Scott Speed	(Germany) Pascal Kochem	(United States) Scott Speed	(Germany) Motopark Academy
9	R2	(Germany) Motorsport Arena Oschersleben	18 September	(United States) Scott Speed	(United States) Scott Speed	(United States) Scott Speed	(Germany) Motopark Academy

== Championship standings ==
=== Drivers ===
Points are awarded to the drivers as follows:

Position	1	2	3	4	5	6	7	8	9	10	PP
Points	30	24	20	16	12	10	8	6	4	2	2

- Races : 2 races of 25 minutes by rounds.

Pos	Driver	MNZ (Italy)		VAL (Spain)		MAG (France)		HOC (Germany)		BRN (Czech Republic)		DON (United Kingdom)		SPA (Belgium)	IMO (Italy)		OSC (Germany)		Points
Pos	Driver	1	2	3	4	5	6	7	8	9	10	11	12	13	14	15	16	17	Points
1	(United States) Scott Speed	2	12	7	DSQ	7	3	1	1	1	1	4	7	1	2	1	1	1	370
2	(France) Simon Pagenaud	10	4	1	Ret	4	1	3	2	5	2	5	9	7	6	Ret	6	4	246
3	(United States) Colin Fleming	24	5	8	8	2	Ret	6	Ret	4	3	3	Ret	2	3	2	3	5	222
4	(Austria) Reinhard Kofler	21	3	6	1	11	5	Ret	4	3	6	10	5	5	5	3	8	9	202
5	(Germany) Pascal Kochem	4	14	5	4	8	10	2	3	2	5	Ret	Ret	3	1	Ret	Ret	7	198
6	(Netherlands) Paul Meijer	5	Ret	16	9	10	2	18	5	6	4	Ret	8	6	4	6	2	2	174
7	(France) Guillaume Moreau	22	2	3	3	3	8					2	2	10					148
8	(Venezuela) Pastor Maldonado	1	1	2	7	Ret	7	15	Ret	7	7			Ret	8	Ret	Ret	8	132
9	(France) Patrick Pilet	13	8			5	4					1	4	24			7	10	102
10	(France) Yann Clairay	8	21	9	2	1	17							Ret			4	Ret	82
11	(Germany) Michael Ammermüller	17	6	15	Ret	15	6	9	Ret	8	8	9	12	8	7	9	12	Ret	64
12	(Germany) Marc Walz	3	Ret	13	6	9	11	5	7	11	DNS								54
13	(United States) Dominique Claessens	16	9	24	12	Ret	22	8	6	10	9	DSQ	Ret	4	13	12	Ret	13	42
14	(Switzerland) Romain Grosjean	7	Ret	10	13	6	24							25			5	22	32
15	(Belgium) Jérôme d'Ambrosio	25	Ret	4	5	13	14							15					28
16	(Russia) Mikhail Aleshin	9	Ret	20	17	20	25	12	22	9	10	DSQ	6	14	12	Ret	11	15	28
17	(Netherlands) Junior Strous	20	16	14	15	Ret	13	4	10			DSQ	13	9	Ret	11	19	11	26
18	(Mexico) Salvador Durán	6	18	22	18	Ret	19	16	13	14	12			13	9	8	Ret	16	20
19	(Italy) Luigi Ferrara							19	12						11	4			16
20	(Italy) Luca Filippi	12	Ret					23	14					18	15	5	Ret	12	14
21	(Finland) Mika Leirilaakso	Ret	13	25	22	Ret	15	14	9	15	13	12	18	17	16	7	14	Ret	14
22	(Brazil) Patrick Rocha	32	Ret	18	15	18	9	Ret	8	12	15	13	11	Ret					14
23	(United Kingdom) James Jakes	18	15	27	19	Ret	12	11	16			8	21	11			13	14	10
24	(France) Julien Canal	Ret	10	12	10	24	16	26	11	13	11	Ret	19	27	14	10	10	Ret	10
25	(Brazil) Marcello Thomaz	14	7	17	16	16	Ret												8
26	(Germany) Bruno Rudolf Fechner							7	Ret								26	Ret	8
27	(Russia) Yuri Baibodorov	23	22	Ret	21	Ret	Ret	17	Ret	16	14	15	10	16	18	17	25	21	6
28	(Netherlands) Yelmer Buurman	26	19	23	14	19	Ret	13	19			11	20	12	Ret	14	21	18	4
29	(Italy) Davide Valsecchi	11	Ret	Ret	Ret	17	26	21	18					19	10	13			2
30	(Netherlands) Xavier Maassen			19	11			10	Ret			Ret	17	22			24	19	2
31	(Russia) Vitaly Petrov	15	11					25	23										0
32	(France) Franck Mailleux	31	Ret	11	24	21	20										Ret	Ret	0
33	(Italy) Malo Olivier					12	DNS												0
34	(France) Johan Charpilienne	30	Ret	21	Ret	14	Ret												0
35	(Germany) Dominik Weigl									17	16	17	22				15	Ret	0
36	(Italy) Cristian Corsini														17	15			0
37	(Germany) Thomas Conrad							20	15										0
38	(Italy) Luca Persiani														DNS	16			0
39	(France) Pierre Ragues													Ret			18	17	0
40	(France) Ludovic Badey	27	17	Ret	23	22	21							26					0
41	(Germany) Marco Dürr							22	17										0
42	(Italy) Andrea Ceccato														20	18			0
43	(France) Ulric Amado de Carvalho					Ret	18							Ret					0
44	(Italy) Frederico Muggia														19	19			0
45	(Germany) Frank Kechele	19	Ret																0
46	(Italy) Riccardo Cinti	29	20	26	20	23	23	Ret	DNS										0
47	(Italy) Gary Cester							24	20					23					0
48	(Germany) Kenny Weiss																20	Ret	0
49	(France) Jean-Francis Gagneraud													20					0
50	(Italy) Massimo Torre							Ret	21										0
51	(France) Cédric Valdevit													21					0
52	(Peru) Juan Manuel Polar																22	Ret	0
53	(Finland) Miikka Honkanen																23	Ret	0
54	(Italy) Giacomo Vargiu			Ret	Ret			Ret	24										0
55	(Italy) Luca Frigerio	28	Ret																0
	(United Kingdom) Andrew Kirkaldy													Ret					0
	(Belgium) Mike den Tandt													Ret					0
The following drivers are guest ineligible to final standing
	(United Kingdom) Mike Conway											7	1						-
	(United Kingdom) Paul di Resta											6	3	Ret					-
	(Finland) Pekka Saarinen																9	3	-
	(Argentina) Matías Milla																17	6	-
	(United Kingdom) Stuart Hall											14	14						-
	(United Kingdom) Charles Hollings											Ret	15						-
	(Germany) Dima Raikhlin																16	20	-
	(Republic of Ireland) Patrick Hogan											16	23	Ret					-
	(United Kingdom) Josh Weber											Ret	16	Ret					-
Pos	Driver	MNZ (Italy)		VAL (Spain)		MAG (France)		HOC (Germany)		BRN (Czech Republic)		DON (United Kingdom)		SPA (Belgium)	IMO (Italy)		OSC (Germany)		Points

Colour	Result
Gold	Winner
Silver	Second place
Bronze	Third place
Green	Points classification
Blue	Non-points classification
Blue	Non-classified finish (NC)
Purple	Retired, not classified (Ret)
Red	Did not qualify (DNQ)
Red	Did not pre-qualify (DNPQ)
Black	Disqualified (DSQ)
White	Did not start (DNS)
White	Withdrew (WD)
White	Race cancelled (C)
Blank	Did not practice (DNP)
Blank	Did not arrive (DNA)
Blank	Excluded (EX)

=== Teams ===
Pos	Team	Points
1	(Germany) Motopark Academy	498
2	(Switzerland) Jenzer Motorsport	490
3	(France) Graff Racing	392
4	(France) SG Formula	262
5	(Italy) JD Motorsport	258
6	(Netherlands) AR Motorsport	204
7	(Italy) Cram Competition	164
8	(Germany) SL Formula Racing	44
9	(Russia) Lukoil Racing Team	32
10	(Italy) Uboldi Corse	16
11	(Finland) Koiranen Motorsport	14
12	(Italy) Euronova Racing	12
13	(United Kingdom) Team AKA	10
14	(Germany) Kern Motorsport	8
	(Italy) BVM Racing	0
	(France) CD Sport	0
	(France) Tech 1 Racing	0
	(France) Green Team	0
	(Germany) Conrad Racing	0
	(Germany) Böhm Motorsport	0
