= Pekka Saarinen =

Finnish racing driver (born 1983)

- Nationality: (Finland) Finnish
- Born: Pekka Mikael Saarinen; 27 July 1983 (age 43) (Finland)

Championship titles
- 2007 2006, 2007 2005 2010-11 2012 2012: China F. Renault Challenge; Asian F. Renault Challenge; F. Renault 2.0 Germany; HRH Roadsport V8; Porsche Carrera Cup Asia; Audi R8 LMS Cup China

Pekka Mikael Saarinen (born 27 July 1983) is a Finnish racing driver and head of PS Racing.

== Karts ==
Saarinen has won the Nordic ICA Junior championship in 1997 and placed second in the Finish Junior A in 1997 and ICA Viking Trophy in 1998. He has also competed in various European Formula A and ICA championships with some success.

== Formula Racing ==
Saarinen has competed for five years in Formula Renault 2.0 where he won the Formula Renault 2.0 Germany series in 2005 for SL Formula Racing and the Asian Formula Renault Challenge in both 2006 and 2007, accompanied by the China Challenge in 2007.

== Racing record ==
=== Career summary ===
Season	Series	Team	Races	Wins	Poles	F/Laps	Podiums	Points	Position
2003	Formula Renault 2.0 Germany	Koiranen Brothers Motorsport	14	0	0	0	0	58	19th
2003	Formula Renault 2000 Masters	Koiranen Brothers Motorsport	2	0	0	0	0	0	35th
2004	Formula Renault 2.0 Germany	SL Formula Racing	14	1	1	0	3	151	8th
2004	Formula Renault 2.0 Netherlands	SL Formula Racing	4	0	0	0	0	49	12th
2004	Formula Renault 2000 Eurocup	SL Formula Racing	2	0	0	0	1	44	13th
2005	Formula Renault 2.0 Germany	SL Formula Racing	16	2	1	0	10	309	1st
2006	Asian Formula Renault Challenge	Shangsai FRD Team	12	7	2	6	9	263	1st
2006	Chinese Formula Renault Challenge	Shangsai FRD Team	12	?	?	?	?	145	3rd
2007	Asian Formula Renault Challenge	PS Racing	14	9	2	10	10	307	1st
2007	Chinese Formula Renault Challenge	PS Racing	14	9	2	10	10	307	1st
2012	Porsche Carrera Cup Asia	PS Racing	2	0	0	0	0	21	16th
2012	Audi R8 LMS Cup China	J-Fly Racing Team	2	0	0	0	0	12	14th
2013	Audi R8 LMS Cup China	J-Fly Racing Team	2	0	0	0	0	0	NC
2016	Asian Le Mans Sprint Cup - LMP3	PS Racing	1	0	0	0	0	0	14th
2018	24H TCE Series - TCR	RWP Racing by Motorsport development	1	0	0	0	0	0	NC

Sporting positions
Preceded by Scott Speed	Formula Renault 2.0 Germany; Drivers' Champion; 2005	Succeeded by Filipe Albuquerque (NEC)
