= Colin Fleming (racing driver) =

American racing driver and business executive

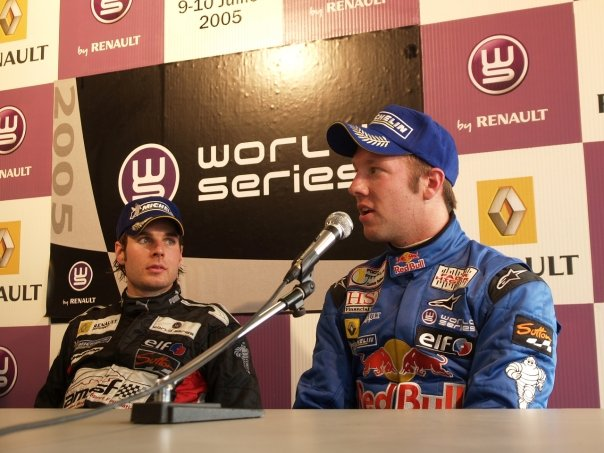
- Fleming (right) in 2005
- Born: April 27, 1984 (age 42) San Diego, California, U.S.
- Retired: 2007

World Series by Renault 3.5 Series
- Years active: 2005–2006
- Teams: Jenzer Motorsport, Carlin Motorsport
- Starts: 34
- Fastest laps: 3
- Best finish: 3rd in 2005

Previous series
- 2006; 2005; 2004; 2003; 2001–2002; 1994–1999; 1998–1999: Atlantic Championship; Formula Renault 2000 Eurocup; Formula Renault 2.0 Germany; Barber Dodge Pro Series; Formula Dodge National Championship; International Kart Federation; WKA Junior North American

Championship titles
- 1994–2002: WKA Junior North American Champion (2x). IKF National Champion (7x).

Colin Fleming (born April 27, 1984) is an American former racing driver & Formula 1 test driver who competed in the World Series by Renault 3.5, Formula Renault 2.0 Eurocup, and Formula Renault 2000 Germany with Jenzer Motorsport and Carlin Motorsport after a successful go-karting career, winning 10 North American and National Championships.

== Racing career ==
A former member from the Red Bull Junior Team, Fleming finished third in the Formula Renault 2.0 Eurocup in 2004 and was rookie of the year in the Formula Renault 2000 Germany also in that year. He raced against fellow American and Californian and future Formula One driver Scott Speed. In 2005, he switched to the Formula Renault 3.5 with Swiss team Jenzer Motorsport, despite three DNS in the first three and missing one race of that season, he finished 13th with 34 points with a best finish of third in the second race in the Bugatti Circuit in LeMans, France. In 2006, he joined Carlin where he finished sixth in the first race of the season in Zolder. Later that year, he finished fourth in Circuit de Monaco and eighth in both races in Istanbul Park, but left Carlin and the Red Bull Junior team after the latter. Red Bull replaced him with fellow Red Bull Junior Team member and future Formula One Champion Sebastian Vettel.

After leaving Red Bull, Fleming returned to the United States to complete in the Atlantic Championship mid-season.

== Personal life ==
Fleming is currently the Chief Marketing Officer, Business at OpenAI as per LinkedIn Profile for Colin Fleming

== Complete motorsports results ==
=== American Open-Wheel racing results ===
(key) (Races in bold indicate pole position, races in italics indicate fastest race lap)

=== 2003 Barber Dodge Pro Series (Rookie of the Year, 5th in championship) ===
Year	1	2	3	4	5	6	7	8	9	10	Rank	Points
2003	STP; 25	MTY; 4	MIL; 10	LAG; 7	POR; 3	CLE; 10	TOR; 2	VAN; 15	MDO; 11	MTL; 3	**5th**	**83**

=== 2004 German Formula Renault – 2nd in the Championship ===
os	Driver name	OSC		ASS		SAL		SAC		NÜR		LAU		OSC		Points
1	Scott Speed	18	1	3	1	2	2	2	1	3	**Ret**	2	8	**3**	**1**	293
2	Colin Fleming	11	10	2	3	**1**	**1**	4	4	5	3	1	7	2	3	284
3	Michael Ammermüller	2	**14**	7	6	5	6	13	3	2	4	4	3	5	2	238
4	Pascal Kochem	1	Ret	6	**2**	3	3	**1**	15	**1**	15	**8**	**1**	20	18	208
5	Mikhail Aleshin	**3**	15	12	7	4	5	17	**2**	10	2	Ret	6	6	13	185

=== 2004 European Formula Renault – 3rd in the Championship ===
Pos	Driver	MNZ		VAL		MAG		HOC		BRN		DON		SPA	IMO		OSC		Points
1	Scott Speed	**2**	**12**	7	DSQ	7	3	**1**	1	**1**	**1**	**4**	7	**1**	2	1	**1**	**1**	370
2	Simon Pagenaud	10	4	1	**Ret**	4	**1**	3	2	5	2	5	9	7	6	Ret	6	4	246
3	Colin Fleming	24	5	8	8	2	Ret	6	**Ret**	4	3	3	**Ret**	2	3	2	3	5	222
4	Reinhard Kofler	21	3	6	1	11	5	Ret	4	3	6	10	5	5	5	3	8	9	202
5	Pascal Kochem	4	14	5	4	8	10	2	3	2	5	Ret	Ret	3	**1**	**Ret**	Ret	7	198

=== World Series by Renault 3.5 ===
(key) (Races in bold indicate pole position) (Races in italics indicate fastest lap)

Year	Entrant	1	2	3	4	5	6	7	8	9	10	11	12	13	14	15	16	17	DC	Points
2005	Jenzer Motorsport	ZOL; 1 DNS	ZOL; 2 DNS	MON; 1 DNS	VAL; 1; 9	VAL; 2; 8	LMS; 1 DNS	LMS; 2; 3	BIL; 1 Ret	BIL; 2; 4	OSC; 1 Ret	OSC; 2; 6	DON; 1; 11	DON; 2; 10	EST; 1; 6	EST; 2 Ret	MOZ; 1 Ret	MOZ; 2; 22	13th	34
2006	Carlin Motorsport	ZOL; 1; 6	ZOL; 2 DNQ	MON; 1; 4	IST; 1; 8	IST; 2; 8	MIS; 1	MIS; 2	SPA; 1	SPA; 2	NUR; 1	NUR; 2	DON; 1	DON; 2	LMS; 1	LMS; 2	CAT; 1	CAT; 2	18th	19
