= 2003 Formula Renault 2000 Masters =

Motor racing competition

Seasons
- ← 2002 2004 →

The 2003 Formula Renault 2000 Masters season was the thirteenth Eurocup Formula Renault 2.0 season. The season began at Brno on 24 May and finished at the Donington Park on 26 October, after eight races. Cram Competition's Esteban Guerrieri who is also Argentine Formula Renault champion won three races on his way to the championship by a 36-point margin over Danish driver Robert Schlünssen, who won abandoned race at Assen. ASM's Simon Pagenaud was two points behind Schlünssen. Pagenaud also won second races on TT Circuit Assen. Other wins were scored by Paul Meijer, Ryan Sharp and Reinhard Kofler.

== Driver Lineup ==
2003 Entry List
Team	No.	Driver name	Rounds
(Italy) JD Motorsport	1	(Russia) Mikhail Aleshin	All
(Italy) JD Motorsport	2	(Denmark) Robert Schlünssen	All
(Italy) JD Motorsport	3	(Austria) Reinhard Kofler	All
(Switzerland) Jenzer Motorsport	4	(United Kingdom) Ryan Sharp	All
(Switzerland) Jenzer Motorsport	5	(Germany) Pascal Kochem	All
(Switzerland) Jenzer Motorsport	6	(United States) Grant Maiman	All
(Germany) ma-con Motorsport	7	(Netherlands) Ross Zwolsman	1–2
(Germany) ma-con Motorsport	8	(Japan) Takuya Izawa	All
(Germany) ma-con Motorsport	57	(Germany) Thomas Weiss	2–3
(Germany) ma-con Motorsport	70	(Germany) Marcel Engels	3–4
(Germany) SL Formula Racing	9	(Germany) Hendrick Vieth	All
(Germany) SL Formula Racing	10	(Germany) Ben Jamini	1–2
(Germany) SL Formula Racing	72	(Finland) Pekka Saarinen	3
(France) ASM	11	(France) Simon Pagenaud	All
(France) ASM	12	(Portugal) Nicolas Armindo	1–2
(France) ASM	16	(France) Johan-Boris Scheier	All
(France) ASM	68	(Mexico) David Martinez Leon	4
(France) Tech 1 Racing	14	(France) Bruce Lorgère-Roux	4
(France) Graff Racing	15	(Japan) Hideaki Nakao	1
(France) Graff Racing	17	(France) Olivier Metz	1, 3–4
(France) Graff Racing	26	(France) David Laisis	All
(France) Graff Racing	49	(France) Guillaume Moreau	2–4
(Italy) Cram Competition	18	(Italy) Marcello Puglisi	1, 3–4
(Italy) Cram Competition	19	(Argentina) Esteban Guerrieri	All
(Italy) Cram Competition	20	(Venezuela) Pastor Maldonado	All
(Italy) Prema Powerteam	21	(France) Franck Perera	All
(Italy) Prema Powerteam	39	(Brazil) Roberto Streit	All
(Italy) Prema Powerteam	77	(Japan) Kohei Hirate	All
(Netherlands) AR Motorsport	22	(Netherlands) Paul Meijer	All
(Belgium) Speedlover	23	(Belgium) Stephanie Boden	1–2, 4
(Italy) BVM Racing	24	(Italy) Cristian Corsini	1
(Italy) BVM Racing	27	(Belgium) Mike den Tandt	1
(Italy) Euronova Racing	25	(Italy) Luca Filippi	1–2, 4
(Italy) Euronova Racing	32	(Russia) Vitaly Petrov	All
(Italy) Euronova Racing	69	(Greece) Elias Papailias	3
(Italy) Durango	28	(Italy) Ferdinando Monfardini	1
(Italy) Durango	42	(Argentina) Rafael Morgenstern	1
(France) Hexis Racing	29	(France) Julien Falcini-Joulian	2, 4
(France) Hexis Racing	30	(France) Ludovic Badey	2, 4
(France) CD Sport	33	(France) Julien Canal	2–4
(France) CD Sport	50	(France) Franck Mailleux	2–3
(France) CD Sport	66	(Mexico) Patrick Goeters	4
(France) CD Sport	67	(Mexico) Homero Richards	4
(France) Scorp Motorsport	34	(France) Ulric Amado de Carvalho	2
(Netherlands) MP Motorsport	35	(Netherlands) Ferdinand Kool	All
(Netherlands) MP Motorsport	36	(Netherlands) Olivier Tielemans	2
(Netherlands) Equipe Verschuur	38	(Netherlands) Yelmer Buurman	2, 4
(Netherlands) Equipe Verschuur	40	(Netherlands) Xavier Maassen	2, 4
(Italy) RP Motorsport	43	(Italy) Davide Valsecchi	2
(Italy) RP Motorsport	44	(Italy) Andrea Sonvico	2
(Italy) RP Motorsport	45	(Finland) Toni Vilander	2
(United Kingdom) Manor Motorsport	46	(United Kingdom) Lewis Hamilton	2
(United Kingdom) Manor Motorsport	47	(United Kingdom) Matthew Wilson	2, 4
(Italy) Imola Racing	51	(Italy) Paolo Maria Nocera	2, 4
(Netherlands) Van Amersfoort Racing	52	(Netherlands) Junior Strous	2–4
(Netherlands) Van Amersfoort Racing	53	(Netherlands) Giedo van der Garde	2–4
(Netherlands) Twinlife Racing Team	54	(Netherlands) Ron Marchal	2
(United Kingdom) Fortec Motorsport	55	(United Kingdom) Mike Conway	2
(United Kingdom) John Village Automotive	56	(United Kingdom) Charles Hollings	2
(Germany) RS-Line	60	(Germany) Marc Walz	3
(Germany) Motopark Academy	61	(Germany) Helmut Sanden	3
(Denmark) Team Formula Sport	71	(Denmark) Kasper Andersen	3
(Denmark) Team Formula Sport	79	(Sweden) Jimmy Jacobsson	3
(Germany) Franken Racing	78	(Germany) Dennis Furchheim	3

== Calendar ==
Round		Circuit	Date	Pole position	Fastest lap	Winning driver	Winning team
1	R1	(Czech Republic) Masaryk Circuit, Brno	24 May	(Argentina) Esteban Guerrieri	(Argentina) Esteban Guerrieri	(Argentina) Esteban Guerrieri	(Italy) Cram Competition
1	R2	(Czech Republic) Masaryk Circuit, Brno	25 May	(Argentina) Esteban Guerrieri	(Argentina) Esteban Guerrieri	(Argentina) Esteban Guerrieri	(Italy) Cram Competition
2	R1	(Netherlands) TT Circuit Assen	2 August	(United Kingdom) Ryan Sharp	(Germany) Pascal Kochem	(Denmark) Robert Schlünssen	(Italy) JD Motorsport
2	R2	(Netherlands) TT Circuit Assen	3 August	(France) Franck Perera	(France) Simon Pagenaud	(France) Simon Pagenaud	(France) ASM
3	R1	(Germany) Motorsport Arena Oschersleben	11 October	(Netherlands) Giedo van der Garde	(Argentina) Esteban Guerrieri	(Argentina) Esteban Guerrieri	(Italy) Cram Competition
3	R2	(Germany) Motorsport Arena Oschersleben	12 October	(Denmark) Robert Schlünssen	(Denmark) Robert Schlünssen	(Netherlands) Paul Meijer	(Netherlands) AR Motorsport
4	R1	(United Kingdom) Donington Park	25 October	(Netherlands) Ferdinand Kool	(Germany) Marcel Engels	(United Kingdom) Ryan Sharp	(Switzerland) Jenzer Motorsport
4	R2	(United Kingdom) Donington Park	26 October	(Netherlands) Giedo van der Garde	(Netherlands) Junior Strous	(Austria) Reinhard Kofler	(Italy) JD Motorsport

== Championship standings ==
=== Drivers ===
Points are awarded to the drivers as follows:

Position	1	2	3	4	5	6	7	8	9	10	PP	FL
Points	30	24	20	16	12	10	8	6	4	2	2	2

Pos	Driver	BRN (Czech Republic)		ASS‡ (Netherlands)		OSC (Germany)		DON (United Kingdom)		Points
Pos	Driver	1	2	3	4	5	6	7	8	Points
1	(Argentina) Esteban Guerrieri	**1**	**1**	10	9	1	26	3	Ret	124
2	(Denmark) Robert Schlünssen	7	2	1	10	6	**2**	13	4	88
3	(France) Simon Pagenaud	4	3	15	1	8	28	7	9	86
4	(Netherlands) Paul Meijer	12	7	11	4	7	1	5	6	84
5	(United Kingdom) Ryan Sharp	6	25	**2**	6	Ret	7	1	3	78
6	(Netherlands) Giedo van der Garde			14	Ret	**19**	3	2	**2**	72
7	(Austria) Reinhard Kofler	10	Ret	25	Ret	3	4	10	1	70
8	(Germany) Hendrick Vieth	3	6	16	Ret	4	32	14	11	46
9	(Brazil) Roberto Streit	5	5	22	19	9	6	8	Ret	44
10	(France) Franck Perera	9	26	5	**Ret**	5	8	4	12	40
11	(Germany) Marc Walz					2	5			36
12	(United Kingdom) Lewis Hamilton			4	2					24
13	(Germany) Pascal Kochem	2	14	6	Ret	11	25	18	17	24
14	(Finland) Toni Vilander			20	3					20
15	(Portugal) Nicolas Armindo	15	4	Ret	Ret					16
16	(Netherlands) Ross Zwolsman	13	9	8	5					16
17	(France) Guillaume Moreau			19	11	14	11	9	5	16
18	(France) Johan-Boris Scheier	20	8	7	7	17	10	Ret	Ret	16
19	(Netherlands) Ferdinand Kool	17	13	Ret	12	12	19	**6**	23	12
20	(Netherlands) Junior Strous			12	15	15	13	26	7	10
21	(Japan) Kohei Hirate	8	10	17	17	16	27	27	13	8
22	(Netherlands) Yelmer Buurman			13	18			21	8	6
23	(Germany) Ben Jamini	21	15	Ret	8					6
24	(Germany) Helmut Sanden					Ret	9			4
25	(Germany) Marcel Engels					10	34	24	DNQ	4
26	(Netherlands) Xavier Maassen			18	13			23	10	2
27	(Japan) Takuya Izawa	11	Ret	3	Ret	Ret	35	12	Ret	0
28	(Venezuela) Pastor Maldonado	Ret	16	9	Ret	Ret	29	11	Ret	0
29	(Russia) Mikhail Aleshin	27	11	Ret	Ret	21	16	22	14	0
30	(France) Julien Canal			DNQ	16	Ret	12	DNQ	21	0
31	(Italy) Ferdinando Monfardini	18	12							0
32	(Germany) Dennis Furchheim					13	33			0
33	(France) Julien Falcini-Joulian			21	14			15	15	0
34	(Argentina) Rafael Morgenstern	14	17							0
35	(Finland) Pekka Saarinen					18	14			0
36	(United States) Grant Maiman	19	19	DNQ	DNQ	Ret	15	17	20	0
37	(France) Olivier Metz	Ret	23			20	17	16	16	0
38	(Belgium) Mike den Tandt	16	18							0
39	(France) David Laisis	22	Ret	23	DNQ	26	18	25	DNQ	0
40	(Mexico) Homero Richards							DNQ	18	0
41	(Italy) Luca Filippi	23	Ret	Ret	Ret			19	Ret	0
42	(Russia) Vitaly Petrov	29	Ret	DNQ	DNQ	Ret	31	Ret	19	0
43	(Mexico) David Martinez Leon							20	22	0
44	(Italy) Marcello Puglisi	28	24			24	20	DNQ	DNQ	0
45	(Italy) Cristian Corsini	26	20							0
46	(Japan) Hideaki Nakao	24	21							0
47	(Denmark) Kasper Andersen					Ret	21			0
48	(Belgium) Stephanie Boden	25	22	DNQ	DNQ			DNQ	DNQ	0
49	(Greece) Elias Papailias					25	22			0
50	(France) Franck Mailleux			DNQ	DNQ	22	30			0
51	(Sweden) Jimmy Jacobsson					23	23			0
52	(Germany) Thomas Weiss			DNQ	DNQ	27	24			0
53	(Italy) Paolo Maria Nocera			24	DNQ					0
	(France) Bruce Lorgère-Roux							Ret	Ret	0
	(United Kingdom) Mike Conway			DNQ	Ret					0
	(Mexico) Patrick Goeters							DNQ	Ret	0
	(France) Ludovic Badey			DNQ	DNQ			DNQ	DNQ	0
	(Italy) Davide Valsecchi			DNQ	DNQ					0
	(United Kingdom) Charles Hollings			DNQ	DNQ					0
	(Italy) Andrea Sonvico			DNQ	DNQ					0
	(Netherlands) Olivier Tielemans			DNQ	DNQ					0
	(United Kingdom) Matthew Wilson			DNQ	DNQ					0
	(Netherlands) Ron Marchal			DNQ	DNQ					0
	(France) Ulric Amado de Carvalho			DNQ	DNQ					0
Pos	Driver	BRN (Czech Republic)		ASS‡ (Netherlands)		OSC (Germany)		DON (United Kingdom)		Points

Colour	Result
Gold	Winner
Silver	Second place
Bronze	Third place
Green	Points classification
Blue	Non-points classification
Blue	Non-classified finish (NC)
Purple	Retired, not classified (Ret)
Red	Did not qualify (DNQ)
Red	Did not pre-qualify (DNPQ)
Black	Disqualified (DSQ)
White	Did not start (DNS)
White	Withdrew (WD)
White	Race cancelled (C)
Blank	Did not practice (DNP)
Blank	Did not arrive (DNA)
Blank	Excluded (EX)

**Bold** – Pole
Italics – Fastest Lap

‡ Points were not awarded in the first race at Assen as race was abandoned after three laps due to massive crash.

=== Teams ===
Pos	Team	Points
1	(Italy) JD Motorsport	158
2	(Italy) Cram Competition	124
3	(France) ASM	118
4	(Switzerland) Jenzer Motorsport	102
5	(Italy) Prema Powerteam	92
6	(Netherlands) AR Motorsport	84
7	(Netherlands) Van Amersfoort Racing	82
8	(Germany) SL Formula Racing	52
9	(Germany) RS-Line	36
10	(United Kingdom) Manor Motorsport	24
11	(Germany) ma-con Motorsport	20
12	(Italy) RP Motorsport	20
13	(France) Graff Racing	16
14	(Netherlands) MP Motorsport	12
15	(Netherlands) Equipe Verschuur	8
15	(Germany) Motopark Academy	4
