= 2005 Formula Renault 2.0 Germany =

Motorsport season

Seasons
- ← 2004 2006 →

The 2005 Formula Renault 2.0 Germany season was the fourteenth Formula Renault 2.0 Germany season and the last before merging into Formula Renault 2.0 Northern European Cup. The season began at Oschersleben on 23 April and finished on 9 October at the same venue, after sixteen races.

SL Formula Racing driver Pekka Saarinen won two races on his way to championship title. Mikhail Aleshin of the Lukoil Racing Team, who won the opening race and four-time winner Filipe Albuquerque of the Motopark Oschersleben team, completed the top three.

== Drivers and teams ==
Team	No.	Driver name	Rounds
(Germany) Motopark Oschersleben	2	(Argentina) Matias Milla	1
(Germany) Motopark Oschersleben	3	(Finland) Teemu Nyman	All
(Germany) Motopark Oschersleben	4	(Portugal) Filipe Albuquerque	2–8
(Germany) Motopark Oschersleben	39	(United States) John Edwards	3–8
(Germany) Kern Motorsport	5	(Germany) Bruno Rudolf Fechner	All
(Germany) Conrad Racing Sport	6	(Switzerland) Sandro Manuzzi	1–6
(Germany) Conrad Racing Sport	7	(Germany) Thomas Conrad	7
(Germany) Best Motorsport	9	(Germany) Philipp Wlazik	1–3
Racing Sweden	11	(Sweden) Joakim Frid	1–3, 5–6
(Netherlands) Marchal Racing	12	(Netherlands) Ron Marchal	4
(Bulgaria) Team RSK	14	(Bulgaria) Hristian Dimitrov	2–7
(Russia) Lukoil Racing Team	16	(Russia) Mikhail Aleshin	All
(Russia) Lukoil Racing Team	17	(Russia) Sergey Afanasyev	All
(Austria) RST Auinger	20	(Austria) Christopher Zöchling	All
(Austria) RST Auinger	22	(Austria) Siegfried Perchtold	2–3, 5–7
(Finland) Novorace Oy	25	(Finland) Atte Mustonen	All
(Germany) SL Formula Racing	27	(Finland) Pekka Saarinen	All
(Germany) SL Formula Racing	28	(Germany) Dima Raihklin	1–3, 5–8
(Germany) SL Formula Racing	29	(Switzerland) Cyndie Allemann	All
(Germany) SL Formula Racing	30	(Denmark) Kasper Andersen	1–3, 5–8
(Netherlands) MP Motorsport	31	(Netherlands) Bas Lammers	4
(Netherlands) Van Amersfoort Racing	32	(Netherlands) Renger van der Zande	1–5, 7–8
(Netherlands) Van Amersfoort Racing	33	(Netherlands) Dominick Muermans	1–4, 7–8
(Netherlands) Van Amersfoort Racing	35	(South Korea) Récardo Bruins Choi	2–5, 8
(Germany) Emsland Racing	36	(Hungary) Barna Paár	1
(Switzerland) Equipe Bernoise	37	(Switzerland) Kurt Böhlen	2
(Switzerland) Equipe Bernoise	38	(Switzerland) Rahel Frey	2
Racing Denmark	40	(Denmark) Johnny Laursen	1
Racing Denmark	41	(Denmark) Jesper Wulf Laursen	1
Racing Denmark	42	(Ukraine) Kostyantyn Khorozov	1
(Germany) JVO Motorsport	43	(Germany) Bernd Deuling	4
(Sweden) Max Racing	44	(Sweden) Max Nilsson	1–7
(Netherlands) Equipe Verschuur	46	(Netherlands) Mervyn Kool	4

== Race calendar and results ==
Round		Circuit	Date	Pole position	Fastest lap	Winning driver	Winning team	Event
1	R1	(Germany) Motopark Oschersleben	23 April	(Russia) Mikhail Aleshin	(Russia) Mikhail Aleshin	(Russia) Mikhail Aleshin	(Russia) Lukoil Racing Team	ADAC Westfalen-Pokal-Rennen
1	R2	(Germany) Motopark Oschersleben	24 April	(Finland) Teemu Nyman	(Denmark) Kasper Andersen	(Denmark) Kasper Andersen	(Germany) SL Formula Racing	ADAC Westfalen-Pokal-Rennen
2	R1	(Germany) Hockenheimring	21 May	(Argentina) Matias Milla	(Portugal) Filipe Albuquerque	(Finland) Pekka Saarinen	(Germany) SL Formula Racing	Beru Top 10
2	R2	(Germany) Hockenheimring	22 May	(Germany) Bruno Rudolf Fechner	(Germany) Bruno Rudolf Fechner	(Germany) Bruno Rudolf Fechner	(Germany) Kern Motorsport	Beru Top 10
3	R1	(Germany) Sachsenring	18 June	(Netherlands) Renger van der Zande	(Netherlands) Renger van der Zande	(Netherlands) Renger van der Zande	(Netherlands) Van Amersfoort Racing	ADAC-Rundstreckenrennen Sachsenring
3	R2	(Germany) Sachsenring	19 June	(Netherlands) Renger van der Zande	(South Korea) Récardo Bruins Choi	(Netherlands) Renger van der Zande	(Netherlands) Van Amersfoort Racing	ADAC-Rundstreckenrennen Sachsenring
4	R1	(Netherlands) TT Circuit Assen	9 July	(Finland) Pekka Saarinen	(Netherlands) Renger van der Zande	(Finland) Pekka Saarinen	(Germany) SL Formula Racing	Beru Top 10
4	R2	(Netherlands) TT Circuit Assen	10 July	(Portugal) Filipe Albuquerque	(Netherlands) Bas Lammers	(Portugal) Filipe Albuquerque	(Germany) Motopark Oschersleben	Beru Top 10
5	R1	(Germany) Nürburgring	30 July	(Netherlands) Renger van der Zande	(South Korea) Récardo Bruins Choi	(Netherlands) Renger van der Zande	(Netherlands) Van Amersfoort Racing	ACV-Sprint-Meeting
5	R2	(Germany) Nürburgring	31 July	(South Korea) Récardo Bruins Choi	(South Korea) Récardo Bruins Choi	(South Korea) Récardo Bruins Choi	(Netherlands) Van Amersfoort Racing	ACV-Sprint-Meeting
6	R1	(Germany) Motopark Oschersleben	6 August	(Portugal) Filipe Albuquerque	(Portugal) Filipe Albuquerque	(Portugal) Filipe Albuquerque	(Germany) Motopark Oschersleben	World Series by Renault
6	R2	(Germany) Motopark Oschersleben	7 August	(Portugal) Filipe Albuquerque	(Portugal) Filipe Albuquerque	(Germany) Dima Raihklin	(Germany) SL Formula Racing	World Series by Renault
7	R1	(Germany) EuroSpeedway Lausitz	13 August	(Finland) Atte Mustonen	(Finland) Atte Mustonen	(Finland) Atte Mustonen	(Finland) Novorace Oy	Beru Top 10
7	R2	(Germany) EuroSpeedway Lausitz	14 August	(Portugal) Filipe Albuquerque	(Portugal) Filipe Albuquerque	(Portugal) Filipe Albuquerque	(Germany) Motopark Oschersleben	Beru Top 10
8	R1	(Germany) Motopark Oschersleben	8 October	(Portugal) Filipe Albuquerque	(Portugal) Filipe Albuquerque	(Portugal) Filipe Albuquerque	(Germany) Motopark Oschersleben	ADAC-Börde-Preis
8	R2	(Germany) Motopark Oschersleben	9 October	(Portugal) Filipe Albuquerque	(Portugal) Filipe Albuquerque	(Netherlands) Renger van der Zande	(Netherlands) Van Amersfoort Racing	ADAC-Börde-Preis

== Standings ==
- Point system : 30, 24, 20, 17, 16, 15, 14, 13, 12, 11, 10, 9, 8, 7, 6, 5, 4, 3, 2, 1 for 20th. No points for Fastest lap or Pole position.
- Races : 2 races per round, 25 minutes long each.

The series also rewarded the best Rookie driver (R) with 7, 5, 3, 1 points for the first four drivers in qualifying and in the races, plus 3 points for fastest lap and for pole position.

Pos	Driver name	OSC (Germany)		HOC (Germany)		SAC (Germany)		ASS (Netherlands)		NÜR (Germany)		OSC (Germany)		LAU (Germany)		OSC (Germany)		Points	Points (R)
Pos	Driver name	1	2	3	4	5	6	7	8	9	10	11	12	13	14	15	16	Points	Points (R)
1	(Finland) Pekka Saarinen	2	2	1	8	2	5	1	2	2	4	3	4	Ret	2	6	3	309	
2	(Russia) Mikhail Aleshin	1	6	2	2	14	4	2	6	5	6	2	3	2	15	5	11	274	
3	(Portugal) Filipe Albuquerque			3	3	11	12	8	1	9	5	1	2	3	1	1	12	273	240
4	(Germany) Bruno Rudolf Fechner	3	4	4	1	4	3	3	3	11	Ret	11	15	6	6	10	6	237	
5	(Netherlands) Renger van der Zande	5	Ret	Ret	15	1	1	9	4	1	2			5	Ret	4	1	228	
6	(Denmark) Kasper Andersen	15	1	Ret	5	3	6			10	3	4	8	Ret	3	3	2	212	
7	(Germany) Dima Raihklin	Ret	5	7	9	Ret	7			4	17	5	1	4	4	2	5	197	
8	(Finland) Teemu Nyman	6	7	8	12	7	16	Ret	7	7	18	7	Ret	7	5	11	4	172	151
9	(Finland) Atte Mustonen	14	9	12	7	5	14	Ret	Ret	3	16	13	14	1	17	15	10	156	134
10	(Russia) Sergey Afanasyev	13	11	9	10	17	8	4	12	Ret	9	6	5	8	Ret	12	15	155	89
11	(South Korea) Récardo Bruins Choi			6	Ret	12	2	12	5	6	1					7	7	146	97
12	(Switzerland) Cyndie Allemann	12	15	14	20	8	15	11	10	17	10	8	6	14	8	14	8	141	
13	(United States) John Michael Edwards					10	9	5	8	8	13	9	Ret	9	9	8	9	134	55
14	(Sweden) Max Nilsson	Ret	Ret	10	13	6	10	6	11	12	8	10	Ret	10	10			125	
15	(Austria) Christopher Zöchling	Ret	13	15	19	DNS	11	Ret	9	14	15	12	16	11	11	9	14	104	15
16	(Switzerland) Sandro Manuzzi	11	14	Ret	14	15	17	Ret	13	13	7	15	10					81	
17	(Sweden) Joakim Frid	8	12	11	11	9	Ret			16	12	Ret	11					78	
18	(Austria) Siegfried Perchtold			16	17	13	Ret			15	14	14	7	12	7			74	
19	(Argentina) Matias Milla	4	3	5	4													70	71
20	(Bulgaria) Hristian Dimitrov			19	22	Ret	13	DNS	Ret	18	11	16	9	15	12			55	6
21	(Netherlands) Dominick Muermans	17	16	13	16	Ret	Ret	Ret	Ret					13	14	13	13	53	
22	(Germany) Philipp Wlazik	9	10	18	18	16	DNS											34	
23	(Switzerland) Rahel Frey			Ret	6							18	12					27	16
24	(Denmark) Jesper Wulf Laursen	7	8															27	
25	(Switzerland) Kurt Böhlen			17	21							17	13	16	16			26	
26	(Netherlands) Ron Marchal							7	15									20	
27	(Netherlands) Mervyn Kool							13	16									13	
28	(Germany) Bernd Deuling							10	Ret									11	
29	(Hungary) Barna Paár	10	Ret															11	
30	(Denmark) Johnny Laursen	16	17															9	
31	(Germany) Thomas Conrad													DNS	13			8	
32	(Netherlands) Bas Lammers							DNS	14									7	
33	(Ukraine) Kostyantyn Khorozov	18	18															6	1
Pos	Driver name	OSC (Germany)		HOC (Germany)		SAC (Germany)		ASS (Netherlands)		NÜR (Germany)		OSC (Germany)		LAU (Germany)		OSC (Germany)		Points	Points (R)

- (R) = Rookies standing
