= 2006 Formula Renault 2.0 Northern European Cup =

Motor racing championship

2006 Formula Renault 2.0 NEC

Seasons
- ← 2005 2007 →

The 2006 Formula Renault 2.0 Northern European Cup was the inaugural Formula Renault 2.0 Northern European Cup season. The season began at Oschersleben on 22 April and finished on 17 September at the Salzburgring, after sixteen races.

Motopark Academy driver Filipe Albuquerque won the NEC championship title, having won four races during the season. Runner-up Chris van der Drift amassed four race wins too. His JD Motorsport team-mate Xavier Maassen completed the top three with two wins.

== Drivers and teams ==
Team	No.	Driver name	Rounds
Racing Sweden	1	(Denmark) Jesper Wulf Laursen	7
Racing Sweden	5	(Sweden) Niklas Edling	7
(Denmark) Team Aarthus Racing	2	(Denmark) Steffen Møller	7
(Denmark) Team Aarthus Racing	6	(Sweden) Sam Whan	7
(Denmark) Team Aarthus Racing	15	(Denmark) Jens Renstrup	7
(Netherlands) MP Motorsport	3	(Netherlands) Oscar Wilkens	All
(Netherlands) MP Motorsport	4	(Netherlands) Helmert Jan van der Slik	1, 3–4
(Netherlands) MP Motorsport	5	(Netherlands) Ricardo van der Ende	6
(Netherlands) van Amersfoort	7	(Netherlands) Dennis Swart	All
(Netherlands) van Amersfoort	8	(Netherlands) Gwendolyn Hertzberger	All
(Germany) Motopark Academy	10	(Portugal) Filipe Albuquerque	1–5, 7–8
(Germany) Motopark Academy	11	(Australia) Nathan Antunes	1–3
(Germany) Motopark Academy	41	(Switzerland) Sébastien Buemi	3–4, 7–8
(Germany) Motopark Academy	42	(United Kingdom) Oliver Oakes	5
(Germany) Motorsport Arena	12	(United States) John Michael Edwards	1–5, 7–8
(Germany) Motorsport Arena	14	(New Zealand) Brendon Hartley	1–5, 7–8
(Germany) Kern Motorsport	15	(Morocco) Yassine Benjamaa	1
(Germany) Kern Motorsport	16	(Germany) Patrick Kreuter	1–5
(Russia) Lukoil Racing	17	(Russia) Sergey Afanasyev	1, 3–8
(Russia) Lukoil Racing	52	(Ukraine) Sergey Chukanov	1, 3–8
(Sweden) Huggare Racing	18	(Sweden) Viktor Huggare	6–7
(Sweden) Team SRTS	22	(Sweden) Micke Ohlsson	6–7
(Italy) JD Motorsport	24	(Denmark) Kasper Andersen	1–2
(Italy) JD Motorsport	25	(New Zealand) Chris van der Drift	1–5, 7–8
(Italy) JD Motorsport	26	(Netherlands) Xavier Maassen	1–5, 7–8
(Finland) Koiranen Bros. Motorsport	27	(Finland) Atte Mustonen	1–5, 7
(Finland) Koiranen Bros. Motorsport	28	(Finland) Tomi Limmonen	1–5, 7
(Finland) Koiranen Bros. Motorsport	69	(Finland) Mika Mäki	7
(Finland) Koiranen Bros. Motorsport	99	(Venezuela) Johnny Cecotto Jr.	2–5
(Germany) SL Formula Racing	29	(Belgium) Frédéric Vervisch	All
(Germany) SL Formula Racing	31	(Russia) Anton Nebylitskiy	All
(Netherlands) AR Motorsport	33	(Netherlands) Dennis Retera	6
(Netherlands) AR Motorsport	34	(Portugal) Duarte Félix da Costa	All
(Netherlands) AR Motorsport	35	(Netherlands) Mervyn Kool	All
(Denmark) KEO Racing	33	(Sweden) Daniel Ivarsson	7
(Denmark) KEO Racing	84	(Sweden) Alexander Haegermark	7
(Netherlands) MDR Motorsport	37	(Estonia) Sten Pentus	5
(Belgium) Astromega Racing	38	(China) Qinghua Ma	3–5
(Romania) Petrom District Racing	39	(Romania) Mihai Marinescu	1–3, 5–8
(Sweden) Trakstar Racing AB	43	(Sweden) Philip Forsman	6–7
(Sweden) Trakstar Racing AB	44	(Sweden) Christian Kronegård	6–7

== Race calendar and results ==
Round		Circuit	Date	Pole position	Fastest lap	Winning driver	Winning team	Event
1	R1	(Germany) Motopark Oschersleben	22 April	(Denmark) Kasper Andersen	(Denmark) Kasper Andersen	(New Zealand) Chris van der Drift	(Italy) JD Motorsport	Beru Top 10
1	R2	(Germany) Motopark Oschersleben	23 April	(New Zealand) Chris van der Drift	(Denmark) Kasper Andersen	(Portugal) Filipe Albuquerque	(Germany) Motopark Academy	Beru Top 10
2	R1	(Belgium) Circuit de Spa-Francorchamps	13 May	(Netherlands) Mervyn Kool	(Finland) Atte Mustonen	(Netherlands) Mervyn Kool	(Netherlands) AR Motorsport	1000 km of Spa
2	R2	(Belgium) Circuit de Spa-Francorchamps	14 May	(New Zealand) Chris van der Drift	(New Zealand) Chris van der Drift	(Netherlands) Xavier Maassen	(Italy) JD Motorsport	1000 km of Spa
3	R1	(Germany) Nürburgring	27 May	(New Zealand) Chris van der Drift	(Switzerland) Sébastien Buemi	(Switzerland) Sébastien Buemi	(Germany) Motopark Academy	Beru Top 10
3	R2	(Germany) Nürburgring	28 May	(New Zealand) Chris van der Drift	(New Zealand) Chris van der Drift	(New Zealand) Chris van der Drift	(Italy) JD Motorsport	Beru Top 10
4	R1	(Netherlands) Circuit Park Zandvoort	3 June	(New Zealand) Chris van der Drift	(New Zealand) Chris van der Drift	(New Zealand) Chris van der Drift	(Italy) JD Motorsport	Pinkster Races
4	R2	(Netherlands) Circuit Park Zandvoort	4 June	(New Zealand) Chris van der Drift	(Netherlands) Mervyn Kool	(New Zealand) Chris van der Drift	(Italy) JD Motorsport	Pinkster Races
5	R1	(Germany) Motopark Oschersleben	1 July	(Netherlands) Xavier Maassen	(Netherlands) Xavier Maassen	(Netherlands) Xavier Maassen	(Italy) JD Motorsport	FIA GT Oschersleben 500km
5	R2	(Germany) Motopark Oschersleben	2 July	(Portugal) Filipe Albuquerque	(New Zealand) Chris van der Drift	(Portugal) Filipe Albuquerque	(Germany) Motopark Academy	FIA GT Oschersleben 500km
6	R1	(Netherlands) TT Circuit Assen	15 July	(Russia) Sergey Afanasyev	(Belgium) Frédéric Vervisch	(Netherlands) Ricardo van der Ende	(Netherlands) MP Motorsport	Beru Top 10
6	R2	(Netherlands) TT Circuit Assen	16 July	(Russia) Sergey Afanasyev	(Russia) Sergey Afanasyev	(Russia) Sergey Afanasyev	(Russia) Lukoil Racing	Beru Top 10
7	R1	(Sweden) Anderstorp Raceway	12 August	(Portugal) Filipe Albuquerque	(Portugal) Duarte Félix da Costa	(Portugal) Filipe Albuquerque	(Germany) Motopark Academy	Swedish Touring Car Championship
7	R2	(Sweden) Anderstorp Raceway	13 August	(Portugal) Duarte Félix da Costa	(New Zealand) Brendon Hartley	(United States) John Michael Edwards	(Germany) Motopark Academy	Swedish Touring Car Championship
8	R1	(Austria) Salzburgring	16 September	(Switzerland) Sébastien Buemi	(Portugal) Filipe Albuquerque	(Switzerland) Sébastien Buemi	(Germany) Motopark Academy	Beru Top 10
8	R2	(Austria) Salzburgring	17 September	(Romania) Mihai Marinescu	(Switzerland) Sébastien Buemi	(Portugal) Filipe Albuquerque	(Germany) Motopark Academy	Beru Top 10

== Standings ==
Race point system
Position	1st	2nd	3rd	4th	5th	6th	7th	8th	9th	10th	11th	12th	14th	15th	16th	17th	18th	19th		
Points	30	24	20	17	16	15	14	13	12	11	10	9	8	7	6	5	4	3	2	1

Pos	Driver name	OSC (Germany)		SPA (Belgium)		NÜR (Germany)		ZAN (Netherlands)		OSC (Germany)		ASS (Netherlands)		AND (Sweden)		SAL (Austria)		Points
Pos	Driver name	1	2	3	4	5	6	7	8	9	10	11	12	13	14	15	16	Points
1	(Portugal) Filipe Albuquerque	7	1	6	15	2	2	4	3	2	1			1	2	2	1	312
2	(New Zealand) Chris van der Drift	1	10	3	10	16	1	1	1	5	2			3	7	12	4	267
3	(Netherlands) Xavier Maassen	2	3	18	1	13	5	3	2	1	5			5	8	4	6	252
4	(Netherlands) Mervyn Kool	6	11	1	4	14	11	19	4	Ret	12	3	3	7	25	7	5	204
5	(United States) John Michael Edwards	8	4	2	DNS	3	7	9	Ret	6	Ret			4	1	6	14	184
6	(Romania) Mihai Marinescu	Ret	6	12	Ret	8	10			9	16	2	4	9	4	3	3	175
7	(Switzerland) Sébastien Buemi					1	3	2	5					2	26	1	2	172
8	(Russia) Sergey Afanasyev	5	2			15	Ret	6	6	Ret	4	Ret	1	15	6	5	16	167
9	(Belgium) Frédéric Vervisch	11	8	9	13	Ret	21	11	10	14	17	6	7	8	5	8	15	152
10	(New Zealand) Brendon Hartley	12	Ret	5	Ret	4	4	10	Ret	4	6			6	3	Ret	7	151
11	(Finland) Atte Mustonen	4	5	7	14	10	6	5	8	3	3			Ret	Ret			149
12	(Portugal) Duarte Félix da Costa	10	12	11	DNS	7	9	13	9	11	7	Ret	5	10	Ret	Ret	8	140
13	(Russia) Anton Nebylitskiy	14	18	15	Ret	9	16	16	11	15	13	7	6	21	13	Ret	11	116
14	(Netherlands) Dennis Swart	17	15	13	9	12	17	18	18	17	18	10	11	20	21	10	12	104
15	(Netherlands) Oscar Wilkens	13	13	Ret	11	Ret	Ret	14	14	12	10	4	Ret	13	14	Ret	Ret	96
16	(Ukraine) Sergey Chukanov	16	DNS			17	15	Ret	12	Ret	9	5	8	Ret	20	9	10	96
17	(Venezuela) Johnny Cecotto Jr.			4	3	6	8	8	Ret	7	Ret							92
18	(Netherlands) Helmert Jan van der Slik	9	7			5	12	7	7									79
19	(Denmark) Kasper Andersen	3	16*	16	2									Ret	12	Ret	9	77
20	(Netherlands) Gwendolyn Hertzberger	19	17	17	12	18	20	Ret	17	18	19	Ret	10	19	23	11	13	74
21	(Germany) Patrick Kreuter	15	14	10	8	19	14	15	16	Ret	14							64
22	(Finland) Tomi Limmonen	Ret	9	Ret	6	Ret	19	Ret	15	10	Ret			14	Ret			55
23	(Netherlands) Ricardo van der Ende											1	2					54
24	(Australia) Nathan Antunes	Ret	Ret	8	5	Ret	13											37
25	(Netherlands) Ron Marchal			14	7	Ret	18	12	Ret									33
26	(China) Qinghua Ma					11	EX	17	13	16	15							33
27	(United Kingdom) Oliver Oakes									8	8							26
28	(Sweden) Philip Forsman (Note: Ineligible for points at Anderstorp.)											8	12	17	15			22
29	(Sweden) Viktor Huggare											9	13	22	18			20
30	(Estonia) Sten Pentus									13	11							18
31	(Sweden) Christian Kronegård											11	14	16	16			17
32	(Sweden) Micke Ohlsson											Ret	9	12	9			12
33	(Finland) Mika Mäki													Ret	11			12
34	(Morocco) Yassine Benjamaa	18	19															5
	(Netherlands) Dennis Retera											Ret	Ret					0
The following drivers are guest ineligible to final standing.
	(Denmark) Steffen Møller													11	10			–
	(Sweden) Daniel Ivarsson													18	17			–
	(Sweden) Alexander Haegermark													Ret	19			–
	(Denmark) Jens Renstrup													24	22			–
	(Sweden) Sam Whan													23	24			–
	(Denmark) Jesper Wulf Laursen													25	Ret			–
	(Sweden) Niklas Edling													Ret	Ret			–
Pos	Driver name	OSC (Germany)		SPA (Belgium)		NÜR (Germany)		ZAN (Netherlands)		OSC (Germany)		ASS (Netherlands)		AND (Sweden)		SAL (Austria)		Points
