= Formula Renault Northern European Cup =

Auto racing championship in Europe

- Category: Formula Renault 2.0
- Country: Europe
- Inaugural season: 2006
- Folded: 2018
- Constructors: Renault
- Engine suppliers: Renault
- Tyre suppliers: Michelin
- Last Drivers' champion: (Germany) Doureid Ghattas
- Last Teams' champion: (France) R-ace GP
- Official website: necup.com

The Formula Renault Northern European Cup (formerly Formula Renault 2.0 NEC) was a Formula Renault 2.0 championship originally held in Northern Europe (Germany, Netherlands and Belgium), but has expanded over the years to the whole of Europe. The series was created in 2006 to merge the Formula Renault 2.0 Germany created in 1991 and the Formula Renault 2.0 Netherlands created in 2003. The series was due to be rebranded as FormulaNEC but was folded prior 2019 due to lack of interest from drivers.

The Formula Renault NEC is organised by its promoter MdH Consultants AG.
In 2007, a Winter Cup, the first off-season championship of this series, was organised in December, in Hockenheim and Oschersleben. The winner got a free entry for the 2008 NEC season.

The cars use Tatuus chassis and the 2.0 L Renault Clio engines like other Formula Renault 2.0 series. Michelin is the tyre supplier.

Points are allowed as following : 30 for the winner, 24 for the 2nd, 20 for the 3rd, then 17, 16, 15... until 1 for the 20. Only classified drivers are awarded by points.

A secondary class, the Formula Renault 2.0 Northern European Cup FR2000, was first contested in 2010.

== Champions ==
=== Formula Renault 2.0 Germany ===
Formula Renault Germany
Season	Champion
1991	(Germany) Joachim Beule
1992	(Germany) Thomas Wöhrle
1993	(Germany) Arnd Meier
1994	(Germany) Marcel Tiemann
1995	(Germany) Ralf Druckenmüller
1996	(Germany) Alexander Müller
1997	(Austria) Robert Lechner
1998	(Netherlands) Hugo van der Ham
1999	(Hungary) Zsolt Baumgartner
2000	Not held

Formula Renault 2000 Germany
Season	Champion
2001	(Germany) Marcel Lasée
2002	(Austria) Christian Klien
2003	(United Kingdom) Ryan Sharp
2004	(United States) Scott Speed

Formula Renault 2.0 Germany
Season	Champion
2005	(Finland) Pekka Saarinen

=== Formula Renault 2.0 Netherlands ===
Formula Renault Netherlands
Season	Champion	Team Champion
1991	(Netherlands) Frank ten Wolde	(Netherlands) Nomag Racing
1992	no data	
1993	no data	
1994	no data	
1995	(Netherlands) Sandor Van Es	
1996– 2002	Not held. Run as Benelux Series	

Formula Renault 2000 Netherlands
Season	Champion	Team Champion
2003	(Netherlands) Paul Meijer	(Netherlands) AR Motorsport
2004	(Netherlands) Junior Strous	(Netherlands) AR Motorsport

Formula Renault 2.0 Netherlands
Season	Champion	Team Champion
2005	(Netherlands) Renger van der Zande	(Netherlands) van Amersfoort Racing

=== Formula Renault 2.0 Northern European Cup ===
Season	Champion	Team Champion	Secondary Class Champion
2006	(Portugal) Filipe Albuquerque	not held	not held
2007	(Germany) Frank Kechele	not held	not held
2008	(Finland) Valtteri Bottas	not held	not held
2009	(Portugal) António Félix da Costa	not held	not held
2010	(Belgium) Ludwig Ghidi	not held	FR2000: (Denmark) Dear Schilling
2011	(Spain) Carlos Sainz Jr.	(Finland) Koiranen bros.	not held
2012	(United Kingdom) Jake Dennis	(United Kingdom) Fortec Motorsports	not held
2013	(United Kingdom) Matt Parry	not held	not held
2014	(United Kingdom) Ben Barnicoat	(Germany) Josef Kaufmann Racing	not held
2015	(Switzerland) Louis Delétraz	(Germany) Josef Kaufmann Racing	R: (Belgium) Max Defourny
2016	(United Kingdom) Lando Norris	(Germany) Josef Kaufmann Racing	R: (United Kingdom) Lando Norris

=== Formula Renault Northern European Cup ===
Season	Champion	Team Champion
2017	(Morocco) Michaël Benyahia	(France) R-ace GP
2018	(Germany) Doureid Ghattas	(France) R-ace GP
