= 2004 Formula Renault 2000 Italia =

Motor racing competition

Seasons
- ← 2003 2005 →

The 2004 Formula Renault 2000 Italia season was the fifth season of the Formula Renault 2000 Italia championship. It was won by Pastor Maldonado driving for Cram Competition.

== Drivers and Teams ==
2004 Entry List
Team	No.	Driver name	Rounds
(Italy) Prema Powerteam	1	(Japan) Kohei Hirate	All
(Italy) Prema Powerteam	2	(Japan) Kamui Kobayashi	All
(Italy) Prema Powerteam	84	(United Kingdom) Ben Clucas	All
(Italy) Cram Competition	3	(Venezuela) Pastor Maldonado	All
(Italy) Cram Competition	16	(Mexico) Salvador Durán	All
(Italy) Cram Competition	24	(Italy) Davide Valsecchi	1-7, 9
(Italy) Cram Competition	46	(Italy) Pietro Ricci	5
(Italy) Cram Competition	81	(Brazil) Marcello Thomaz	1
(Italy) RP Motorsport	5	(Italy) Marco Frezza	1-7
(Italy) RP Motorsport	27	(Italy) Marcello Puglisi	All
(Italy) RP Motorsport	29	(Italy) Paolo Maria Nocera	1-6
(Italy) RP Motorsport	31	(Italy) Andrea Sonvico	All
(Italy) RP Motorsport	77	(France) Jean-Philippe Guignet	7-8
(Italy) Alan Racing Team	6	(Italy) Andrea Cortinovis	7-9
(Italy) Alan Racing Team	7	(Italy) Mauro Massironi	All
(Italy) IT Loox Racing Car	8	(Italy) Giorgio Sernagiotto	All
(Italy) IT Loox Racing Car	9	(United Kingdom) Bradley Ellis	All
(Switzerland) Jenzer Motorsport	10	(Switzerland) David Oberle	9
(Switzerland) Jenzer Motorsport	20	(Germany) Michael Ammermüller	9
(Switzerland) Jenzer Motorsport	30	(United States) Dominique Claessens	9
(Italy) Lemar Motors	11	(Italy) Marco Mocci	All
(Italy) Lemar Motors	21	(Italy) Giandomenico Sposito	2-7, 9
(Italy) BVM Racing	12	(Italy) Luca Persiani	All
(Italy) BVM Racing	41	(Italy) Andrea Ceccato	All
(Italy) BVM Racing	71	(China) Tengyi Jiang	1-3, 5-6, 8-9
(Italy) CEK Team	14	(Argentina) Juan Manuel Passera	1-7
(Italy) CEK Team	15	(Italy) Efisio Marchese	1-5, 7
(Italy) CEK Team	48	(Italy) Nicola Gianniberti	8-9
(Italy) CEK Team	51	(Italy) Federico Rafetti	7
(Italy) CEK Team	54	(Italy) Marino Spinozzi	9
(Italy) Viola Formula Racing	15	(Italy) Efisio Marchese	9
(Italy) Durango	18	(Italy) Riccardo Azzoli	All
(Italy) Durango	19	(Italy) Rossana Ammirati	1-2
(Italy) Durango	53	(Italy) Niccolò Valentini	9
(Italy) Bem Racing	22	(Italy) Tobias Rauch	All
(Italy) Bem Racing	47	(Italy) Thomas Plank	6-9
(Italy) Bicar Racing	23	(Italy) Cristian Corsini	All
(Italy) Bicar Racing	49	(Switzerland) Fabio Mena	7-9
(Italy) Euronova Jr Team	25	(Italy) Luca Filippi	All
(Italy) Euronova Jr Team	28	(Italy) Gary Cester	All
(Italy) Euronova Jr Team	32	(Russia) Vitaly Petrov	1-3
(Italy) Euronova Jr Team	96	(Italy) Filippo Ponti	9
(Italy) A.S. Discovery Racing	26	(Italy) Riccardo Mari	1-7
(Italy) Uboldi Corse	33	(Italy) Luigi Ferrara	All
(Italy) Uboldi Corse	34	(Italy) Giacomo Vargiu	1-7, 9
(Italy) Uboldi Corse	35	(Italy) Riccardo Cinti	1-5
(Italy) Uboldi Corse	36	(Italy) Massimo Torre	All
(Italy) M&C Motorsport	38	(Italy) Stefano Turchetto	1-7, 9
(Italy) Birel Formula	39	(Italy) Manuele Gatto	2, 4-7, 9
(Italy) Birel Formula	45	(Italy) Giuseppe Luca Di Cienzo	2
(Italy) Benvissuto Racing	42	(Italy) Andrea Marra	1-3
(Italy) Benvissuto Racing	43	(Italy) Davide Giampapa	3
(Italy) Benvissuto Racing	44	(Italy) Angelo De Carlo	2
(Italy) Toby Racing	52	(Italy) Luca Frigerio	7, 9
(Italy) W.R.C. Srl	74	(Italy) Davide Rigon	4

== Calendar ==
Round	Race	Circuit	Date	Pole position	Fastest lap	Winning driver	Winning team
1	R1	(Italy) ACI Vallelunga Circuit	March 14	(Japan) Kohei Hirate	(Japan) Kohei Hirate	(Japan) Kohei Hirate	(Italy) Prema Powerteam
1	R2	(Italy) ACI Vallelunga Circuit	March 14		(Venezuela) Pastor Maldonado	(Venezuela) Pastor Maldonado	(Italy) Cram Competition
2	R1	(Italy) Autodromo Riccardo Paletti	April 4	(Japan) Kohei Hirate	(Venezuela) Pastor Maldonado	(Japan) Kohei Hirate	(Italy) Prema Powerteam
3	R1	(Italy) Autodromo dell'Umbria	May 9	(Japan) Kohei Hirate	(Japan) Kohei Hirate	(Japan) Kohei Hirate	(Italy) Prema Powerteam
4	R1	(Belgium) Circuit de Spa-Francorchamps	June 5	(Venezuela) Pastor Maldonado	(Venezuela) Pastor Maldonado	(Venezuela) Pastor Maldonado	(Italy) Cram Competition
4	R2	(Belgium) Circuit de Spa-Francorchamps	June 6		(Venezuela) Pastor Maldonado	(Venezuela) Pastor Maldonado	(Italy) Cram Competition
5	R1	(Italy) Autodromo Nazionale Monza	June 26	(Venezuela) Pastor Maldonado	(Italy) Luca Filippi	(Japan) Kohei Hirate	(Italy) Prema Powerteam
5	R2	(Italy) Autodromo Nazionale Monza	June 27		(Venezuela) Pastor Maldonado	(Japan) Kohei Hirate	(Italy) Prema Powerteam
5	R3	(Italy) Autodromo Nazionale Monza	June 27		(Venezuela) Pastor Maldonado	(Japan) Kohei Hirate	(Italy) Prema Powerteam
6	R1	(Italy) Misano World Circuit	July 24	(Japan) Kohei Hirate	(Japan) Kamui Kobayashi	(Japan) Kamui Kobayashi	(Italy) Prema Powerteam
6	R2	(Italy) Misano World Circuit	July 25		(United Kingdom) Ben Clucas	(Japan) Kamui Kobayashi	(Italy) Prema Powerteam
6	R3	(Italy) Misano World Circuit	July 25		(Italy) Luca Persiani	(Italy) Luigi Ferrara	(Italy) Uboldi Corse
7	R1	(Italy) Adria International Raceway	September 26	(Venezuela) Pastor Maldonado	(Venezuela) Pastor Maldonado	(Venezuela) Pastor Maldonado	(Italy) Cram Competition
8	R1	(Germany) Hockenheimring	October 9	(Japan) Kamui Kobayashi	(Venezuela) Pastor Maldonado	(Venezuela) Pastor Maldonado	(Italy) Cram Competition
8	R2	(Germany) Hockenheimring	October 10		(Venezuela) Pastor Maldonado	(Venezuela) Pastor Maldonado	(Italy) Cram Competition
9	R1	(Italy) Autodromo Nazionale Monza	October 17	(Germany) Michael Ammermüller	(Venezuela) Pastor Maldonado	(Venezuela) Pastor Maldonado	(Italy) Cram Competition
9	R2	(Italy) Autodromo Nazionale Monza	October 17		(Venezuela) Pastor Maldonado	(Venezuela) Pastor Maldonado	(Italy) Cram Competition

== Championship standings ==
Points are awarded to the drivers as follows:

Position	1	2	3	4	5	6	7	8	9	10	PP	FL
Points	30	24	20	16	12	10	8	6	4	2	2	2

=== Drivers ===
Pos	Driver	VLL (Italy)		VAR (Italy)	MAG (Italy)	SPA (Belgium)		MNZ (Italy)			MIS (Italy)			ADR (Italy)	HOC (Germany)		MNZ (Italy)		Points
Pos	Driver	1	2	3	4	5	6	7	8	9	10	11	12	13	14	15	16	17	Points
1	(Venezuela) Pastor Maldonado	2	1	2	4	1	1	Ret	6	3	10	3	Ret	1	1	1	1	1	362
2	(Japan) Kohei Hirate	1	23	1	1	5	2	1	1	1	Ret	DNS	DNS	3	2	2	Ret	13	266
3	(Italy) Luca Filippi	4	2	3	6	2	4	3	26	Ret	9	5	2	7	8	4	3	2	234
4	(Italy) Luigi Ferrara	5	12	22	2	4	5	5	4	5	3	2	1	5	6	22	29	4	184
5	(United Kingdom) Ben Clucas	10	Ret	4	11	3	3	4	3	4	6	24	9	11	5	3	7	6	160
6	(Italy) Luca Persiani	9	4	5	DNQ	Ret	13	2	2	2	2	4	15	2	21	5	9	17	148
7	(Japan) Kamui Kobayashi	Ret	10	7	3	6	9	18	10	6	1	1	13	8	4	24	4	12	134
8	(Mexico) Salvador Durán	6	3	19	14	Ret	6	6	5	Ret	8	6	3	6	3	20	Ret	9	115
9	(Italy) Andrea Sonvico	7	5	17	16	8	7	21	7	Ret	11	Ret	22	4	15	7	6	5	94
10	(Italy) Mauro Massironi	8	27	Ret	Ret	7	8	Ret	20	9	4	Ret	12	10	9	8	23	15	44
11	(Italy) Marco Mocci	11	21	9	Ret	12	11	8	8	7	5	14	5	16	14	Ret	15	Ret	36
12	(Italy) Riccardo Azzoli	15	9	12	5	13	Ret	7	16	8	7	Ret	10	15	17	9	13	Ret	36
13	(Italy) Marcello Puglisi	21	Ret	23	7	9	10	19	27	Ret	23	Ret	21	Ret	7	6	12	Ret	34
14	(Italy) Davide Valsecchi	30	22	6	Ret	27	12	23	9	11	13	10	Ret	13			8	8	31
15	(Italy) Tobias Rauch	28	6	11	DNQ	Ret	Ret	9	11	Ret	15	9	4	19	Ret	18	Ret	Ret	30
16	(Italy) Gary Cester	23	18	18	10	20	Ret	Ret	Ret	17	22	12	6	9	Ret	11	17	7	26
17	(Brazil) Marcello Thomaz	3	20																20
18	(Italy) Cristian Corsini	17	13	14	15	25	25	Ret	19	21	21	7	7	22	10	10	11	27	20
19	(Italy) Giorgio Sernagiotto	18	14	13	Ret	16	Ret	17	13	10	16	8	8	Ret	11	Ret	31	16	11
20	(Italy) Paolo Maria Nocera	13	7	Ret	Ret	Ret	16	22	15	16	28	17	Ret						8
21	(Italy) Massimo Torre	14	8	DNQ	Ret	26	23	Ret	Ret	12	19	16	19	Ret	Ret	16	21	Ret	6
22	(Italy) Manuele Gatto			8		19	21	20	25	28	20	22	Ret	12			22	14	6
23	(Italy) Giandomenico Sposito			DNQ	8	21	19	Ret	21	18	29	19	Ret	Ret			Ret	22	6
24	(Italy) Filippo Ponti																10	23	6
25	(Italy) Efisio Marchese	Ret	Ret	DNQ	DNQ	24	24	10	14	25				DNQ			14	11	5
26	(Italy) Andrea Ceccato	22	28	DNQ	9	14	18	12	Ret	13	12	21	11	20	12	19	24	24	4
27	(Italy) Giacomo Vargiu	12	Ret	Ret	Ret	10	Ret	Ret	24	22	14	23	Ret	Ret			Ret	18	2
28	(Russia) Vitaly Petrov	29	25	10	Ret														2
29	(Italy) Riccardo Mari	16	11	DNQ	Ret	18	15	14	12	27	17	15	14	14					0
30	(Italy) Marco Frezza	19	16	20	12	23	17	15	28	15	Ret	11	17	23					0
31	(Italy) Davide Rigon					11	14												0
32	(Italy) Riccardo Cinti	24	17	DNQ	DNQ	17	26	11	Ret	23									0
33	(China) Tengyi Jiang	25	Ret	15	13			16	22	20	24	20	Ret		16	12	20	20	0
34	(United Kingdom) Bradley Ellis	27	26	DNQ	DNQ	22	22	13	17	14	25	Ret	18	21	13	17	25	26	0
35	(Argentina) Juan Manuel Passera	26	15	21	Ret	Ret	27	Ret	18	19	18	13	Ret	17					0
36	(Italy) Nicola Gianniberti														18	13	30	Ret	0
37	(Italy) Andrea Cortinovis													Ret	19	14	16	Ret	0
38	(Italy) Stefano Turchetto	20	19	DNQ	Ret	15	20	Ret	23	24	26	18	16	18			18	21	0
39	(France) Jean-Philippe Guignet													24	22	15			0
40	(Italy) Giuseppe Luca Di Cienzo			16															0
41	(Italy) Luca Frigerio													25			Ret	19	0
42	(Italy) Fabio Mena													Ret	20	21	Ret	Ret	0
43	(Italy) Thomas Plank										27	25	20	DNQ	Ret	23	27	28	0
44	(Italy) Rossana Ammirati	Ret	24	DNQ	DNQ														0
45	(Italy) Niccolò Valentini																28	25	0
46	(Italy) Pietro Ricci							Ret	Ret	26									0
47	(Italy) Marino Spinozzi																26	Ret	0
	(Italy) Andrea Marra	Ret	DNQ	DNQ	DNQ														
	(Italy) Angelo De Carlo			DNQ															
	(Italy) Davide Giampapa				DNQ														
	(Italy) Federico Rafetti													DNQ					
Guest drivers ineligible for points.
	(Germany) Michael Ammermüller																2	3	
	(United States) Dominique Claessens																5	Ret	
	(Switzerland) David Oberle																19	10	
