= 2003 Formula Renault 2000 Italia =

Motor racing competition

Seasons
- ← 2002 2004 →

The 2003 Formula Renault 2000 Italia season was the fourth season of the Formula Renault 2000 Italia championship. It was won by Franck Perera driving for Prema Powerteam.

== Drivers and Teams ==
2003 Entry List
Team	No.	Driver name	Rounds
(Italy) Cram Competition	1	(Italy) Marcello Puglisi	All
(Italy) Cram Competition	3	(Venezuela) Pastor Maldonado	All
(Italy) Cram Competition	6	(France) Damien Pasini	1-2
(Italy) Cram Competition	19	(Argentina) Esteban Guerrieri	All
(Italy) Cram Competition	37	(Italy) Paolo Maria Nocera	6-12
(Italy) Cram Competition	42	(Argentina) Rafael Morgenstern	3
(Italy) Birel Formula	4	(Italy) Gabriele Farina	1-2
(Italy) Birel Formula	5	(Italy) Manuele Gatto	3-12
(Italy) Birel Formula	24	(Italy) Marco Mocci	10-12
(Italy) Prema Powerteam	7	(Japan) Kohei Hirate	All
(Italy) Prema Powerteam	21	(France) Franck Perera	All
(Italy) Prema Powerteam	39	(Brazil) Roberto Streit	All
(Italy) Facondini Racing	9	(Italy) Massimo Torre	11
(Italy) Alan Racing Team	11	(Italy) Mauro Massironi	All
(Italy) Alan Racing Team	14	(Brazil) Ruben Carrapatoso	All
(Italy) Lemar Motorsport	12	(Italy) Leonardo Geraci	All
(Italy) Lemar Motorsport	13	(Italy) Iwan Ceccon	4-12
(Italy) BVM Minardi Jnr.	15	(Italy) Cristian Corsini	All
(Italy) BVM Minardi Jnr.	16	(Italy) Luca Casadei	1-9
(Italy) BVM Minardi Jnr.	18	(Spain) Diego Puyo	1-2, 6-12
(Italy) BVM Minardi Jnr.	44	(Belgium) Mike den Tandt	4-5
(Austria) Renauer Motorsport	22	(Russia) Timur Revazov	1-3, 6-9, 12
(Austria) Renauer Motorsport	54	(Russia) Eddy Revazov	12
(Italy) Target Racing	23	(Italy) Luca Persiani	All
(Italy) Target Racing	24	(Italy) Marco Mocci	1-9
(Italy) Target Racing	45	(Italy) Alessio Modica	12
(Italy) Euronova Junior Team	25	(Italy) Luca Filippi	All
(Italy) Euronova Junior Team	32	(Russia) Vitaly Petrov	All
(Italy) Discovery Racing	26	(Italy) Riccardo Mari	1-5, 8-12
(Italy) RP Motorsport	27	(Italy) Davide Valsecchi	All
(Italy) RP Motorsport	29	(Finland) Toni Vilander	All
(Italy) RP Motorsport	31	(Italy) Andrea Sonvico	All
(Italy) Durango	28	(Italy) Ferdinando Monfardini	1-9
(Italy) Durango	42	(Argentina) Rafael Morgenstern	1-2, 4-12
(Italy) Durango	51	(Italy) Riccardo Azzoli	10-11
(Italy) Durango	59	(Paraguay) Elio Saurini	12
(Italy) Uboldi Corse	33	(Italy) Luigi Ferrara	All
(Italy) Uboldi Corse	34	(Italy) Giacomo Vargiu	All
(Italy) Uboldi Corse	35	(Italy) Alex Ciompi	All
(Italy) Uboldi Corse	41	(Italy) Luca Frigerio	4-7
(Italy) Uboldi Corse	52	(Italy) Manuel Deodati	11-12
(Italy) Imola Racing	36	(Italy) Nicola Rinaldi	1-3
(Italy) Imola Racing	37	(Italy) Paolo Maria Nocera	1-5
(Italy) Toby Racing	38	(Italy) Riccardo Messa	1-2
(Italy) Toby Racing	41	(Italy) Luca Frigerio	3, 10-12
(Italy) Toby Racing	43	(Italy) Alessandro Bonetti	3
(Italy) Toby Racing	45	(Italy) Alessio Modica	8-10
(Italy) Toby Racing	53	(Italy) Pietro Ricci	11-12
(Italy) Toby Racing	55	(Italy) Giuseppe Luca Di Cienzo	12
(San Marino) W&D Racing Team	46	(San Marino) Paolo Meloni	1-9, 12
(Switzerland) Jenzer Motorsport	47	(United Kingdom) Ryan Sharp	4-5
(Switzerland) Jenzer Motorsport	48	(Germany) Pascal Kochem	4-5
(Switzerland) Jenzer Motorsport	49	(United States) Grant Maiman	4-5
(Italy) M&C Motosport	57	(Italy) Ercole Mores	12
(Italy) M&C Motosport	61	(Italy) Mattia Chiello	8-10

== Calendar ==
Round	Circuit	Date	Pole position	Fastest lap	Winning driver	Winning team
1	(Italy) ACI Vallelunga Circuit	April 13	(Finland) Toni Vilander	(Brazil) Ruben Carrapatoso	(Argentina) Esteban Guerrieri	(Italy) Cram Competition
2	(Italy) ACI Vallelunga Circuit	April 13	(France) Franck Perera	(Argentina) Esteban Guerrieri	(Argentina) Esteban Guerrieri	(Italy) Cram Competition
3	(Italy) Autodromo dell'Umbria	May 4	(France) Franck Perera	(France) Franck Perera	(France) Franck Perera	(Italy) Prema Powerteam
4	(Belgium) Circuit de Spa-Francorchamps	June 8	(Germany) Pascal Kochem	(Japan) Kohei Hirate	(United Kingdom) Ryan Sharp	(Switzerland) Jenzer Motorsport
5	(Belgium) Circuit de Spa-Francorchamps	June 9	(Argentina) Esteban Guerrieri	(United Kingdom) Ryan Sharp	(Argentina) Esteban Guerrieri	(Italy) Cram Competition
6	(Austria) A1 Ring	June 22	(France) Franck Perera	(Italy) Luigi Ferrara	(Japan) Kohei Hirate	(Italy) Prema Powerteam
7	(Austria) A1 Ring	June 22	(France) Franck Perera	(Finland) Toni Vilander	(France) Franck Perera	(Italy) Prema Powerteam
8	(Italy) Misano World Circuit	July 27	(France) Franck Perera	(Brazil) Ruben Carrapatoso	(Finland) Toni Vilander	(Italy) RP Motorsport
9	(Italy) Misano World Circuit	July 27	(France) Franck Perera	(France) Franck Perera	(France) Franck Perera	(Italy) Prema Powerteam
10	(Italy) Autodromo Riccardo Paletti	September 14	(France) Franck Perera	(France) Franck Perera	(France) Franck Perera	(Italy) Prema Powerteam
11	(Italy) Adria International Raceway	September 28	(France) Franck Perera	(France) Franck Perera	(France) Franck Perera	(Italy) Prema Powerteam
12	(Italy) Autodromo Nazionale Monza	October 18	(Venezuela) Pastor Maldonado	(Venezuela) Pastor Maldonado	(Argentina) Esteban Guerrieri	(Italy) Cram Competition

== Championship standings ==
Points are awarded to the drivers as follows:

Position	1	2	3	4	5	6	7	8	9	10	PP	FL
Points	30	24	20	16	12	10	8	6	4	2	2	2

=== Drivers ===
Pos	Driver	VLL (Italy)		MGI (Italy)	SPA (Belgium)		A1R (Austria)		MIS (Italy)		VAR (Italy)	ADR (Italy)	MNZ (Italy)	Points
Pos	Driver	1	2	3	4	5	6	7	8	9	10	11	12	Points
1	(France) Franck Perera	3	3	1	23	4	Ret	1	Ret	1	1	1	2	242
2	(Argentina) Esteban Guerrieri	1	1	Ret	2	1	7	Ret	3	6	5	3	1	217
3	(Finland) Toni Vilander	2	26	13	8	8	2	2	1	2	3	2	3	205
4	(Brazil) Roberto Streit	5	4	2	4	6	4	Ret	6	Ret	4	5	6	142
5	(Italy) Luigi Ferrara	6	16	Ret	3	Ret	5	3	5	4	2	6	Ret	125
6	(Brazil) Ruben Carrapatoso	23	7	3	9	2	10	4	2	5	7	Ret	28	120
7	(Venezuela) Pastor Maldonado	7	2	14	5	3	3	18	Ret	7	9	4	9	118
8	(Japan) Kohei Hirate	12	6	4	10	9	1	11	4	3	8	7	Ret	113
9	(Argentina) Rafael Morgenstern	4	10	7	18	23	9	Ret	20	Ret	22	Ret	4	46
10	(Italy) Ferdinando Monfardini	11	Ret	Ret	7	5	11	6	7	11				38
11	(United Kingdom) Ryan Sharp				1	Ret								31
12	(Italy) Luca Persiani	9	13	Ret	17	12	6	5	Ret	Ret	Ret	9	22	30
13	(Italy) Mauro Massironi	8	5	Ret	11	19	15	8	10	10	13	Ret	17	28
14	(Italy) Marco Mocci	17	21	5	15	Ret	8	10	9	13	16	12	13	24
15	(Italy) Davide Valsecchi	10	9	11	12	13	13	7	Ret	21	6	11	Ret	24
16	(Belgium) Mike den Tandt				6	7								18
17	(Italy) Cristian Corsini	13	11	8	Ret	Ret	Ret	19	11	9	17	24	7	18
18	(Italy) Luca Filippi	Ret	19	Ret	13	16	14	9	8	8	11	19	Ret	16
19	(Russia) Vitaly Petrov	27	25	16	16	18	17	20	15	14	18	Ret	5	12
20	(Italy) Paolo Maria Nocera	14	15	6	27	24	Ret	Ret	24	20	24	16	30	10
21	(Italy) Alex Ciompi	25	12	Ret	22	Ret	20	14	Ret	12	Ret	8	10	8
22	(Italy) Luca Casadei	29	8	15	24	Ret	12	Ret	25	Ret				6
23	(Spain) Diego Puyo	19	27				22	Ret	18	Ret	15	Ret	8	6
24	(San Marino) Paolo Meloni	20	30	9	26	17	Ret	Ret	23	24			Ret	4
25	(Germany) Pascal Kochem				Ret	10								3
26	(Italy) Marcello Puglisi	22	20	DNQ	30	15	Ret	12	12	23	10	20	DNQ	2
27	(Italy) Leonardo Geraci	16	17	10	Ret	Ret	19	15	17	Ret	DNQ	15	12	2
28	(Italy) Riccardo Azzoli										23	10		2
29	(Italy) Giacomo Vargiu	21	18	12	25	11	Ret	17	14	22	14	17	29	0
30	(Italy) Luca Frigerio			Ret	28	21	16	Ret			19	23	11	0
31	(Italy) Riccardo Mari	Ret	29	17	21	14			16	16	12	13	18	0
32	(Italy) Manuele Gatto			Ret	20	20	18	13	13	Ret	21	Ret	15	0
33	(Italy) Andrea Sonvico	18	Ret	18	19	Ret	Ret	Ret	21	17	20	Ret	14	0
34	(Italy) Pietro Ricci											14	26	0
35	(Italy) Nicola Rinaldi	Ret	14	DNQ										0
36	(United States) Grant Maiman				14	Ret								0
37	(Russia) Timur Revazov	24	23	DNQ			21	Ret	Ret	15			16	0
38	(France) Damien Pasini	15	28											0
39	(Italy) Iwan Ceccon				29	22	Ret	16	22	19	DNQ	22	21	0
40	(Italy) Alessio Modica								19	18	DNQ		23	0
41	(Italy) Massimo Torre											18		0
42	(Russia) Eddy Revazov												19	0
43	(Italy) Manuel Deodati											21	Ret	0
44	(Italy) Riccardo Messa	28	22											0
45	(Italy) Gabriele Farina	26	24											0
46	(Paraguay) Elio Saurini												24	0
47	(Italy) Giuseppe Luca Di Cienzo												25	0
48	(Italy) Ercole Mores												27	0
	(Italy) Mattia Chiello								Ret	Ret	DNQ			
	(Italy) Alessandro Bonetti			DNQ										
