= Michael Ammermüller =

German racing driver (born 1986)

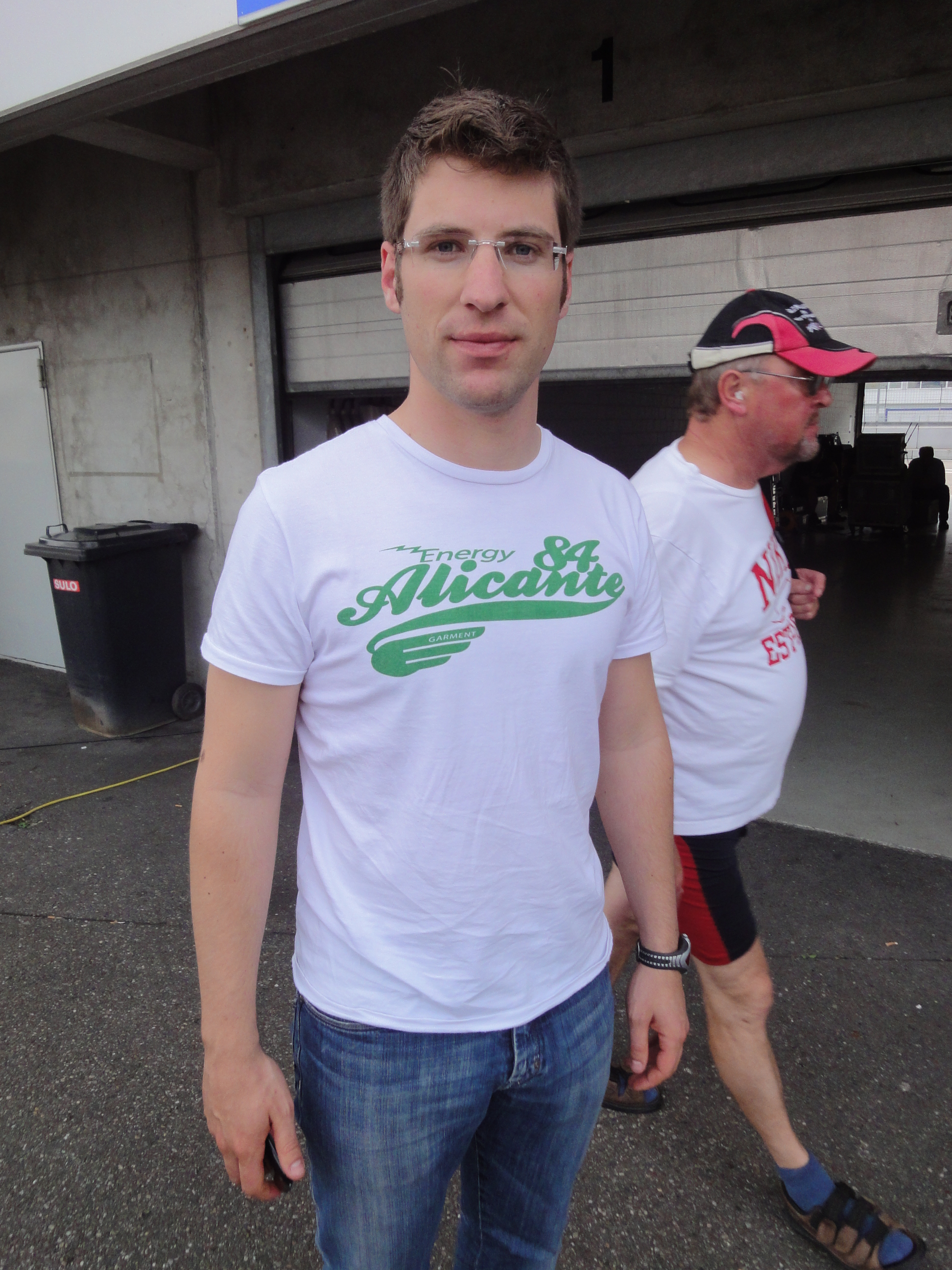
- Ammermüller in 2010
- Nationality: (Germany) German
- Born: 14 February 1986 (age 40) Pocking, West Germany

Porsche Supercup career
- Debut season: 2012
- Current team: SSR Huber Racing
- Categorisation: FIA Gold (until 2019); FIA Platinum (2020–)
- Car number: 4
- Former teams: BWT Lechner Racing
- Starts: 84
- Wins: 11
- Poles: 12
- Fastest laps: 14
- Best finish: 1st in 2017, 2018, 2019

Previous series
- 2008 2007-09 2007 2006-07 2004 2004: International Formula Master; A1 Grand Prix; Formula Renault 3.5 Series; GP2 Series; German Formula Renault; Formula Renault 2.0 Eurocup

Championship titles
- 2020 2017-2019: ADAC GT Masters; Porsche Supercup

Michael Ammermüller (born 14 February 1986) is a German racing driver. After competing in various junior formulae, he became a test and reserve driver for the Red Bull Racing Formula One team in the 2007 season. Following this, he represented Germany in the final two seasons of the A1 Grand Prix series in 2007–08 and 2008–09, before competing for two seasons in ADAC GT Masters. In 2012, he began competing in the Porsche Supercup series for Walter Lechner Racing. He won three consecutive seasons, having won in 2017, 2018 and 2019.

== Career ==
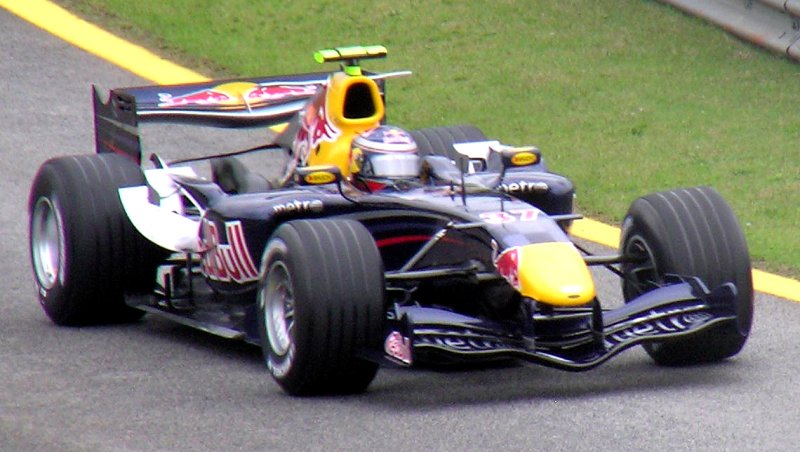
Ammermüller as the Red Bull Racing Formula One team's third driver at the 2006 Brazilian Grand Prix.

In 2004, Ammermüller drove the number three car in German Formula Renault and competed in Formula Renault 2000 Eurocup. In 2006, he competed in the GP2 Series for Arden International.

As a member of the Red Bull Junior Team, after Christian Klien was dropped by the Red Bull Racing Formula One team for the final three races of the 2006 season, the team's third driver, Robert Doornbos, was promoted to the second race seat. This left a vacancy in the team, and Ammermüller was promoted to third driver for the last three races of the season. He tested the car for the first time on 14 September, driving the distance necessary for an FIA Super Licence.

After acting as Third Driver for the last three Grands Prix of 2006, Ammermüller was signed by Red Bull as a full-time tester for 2007.

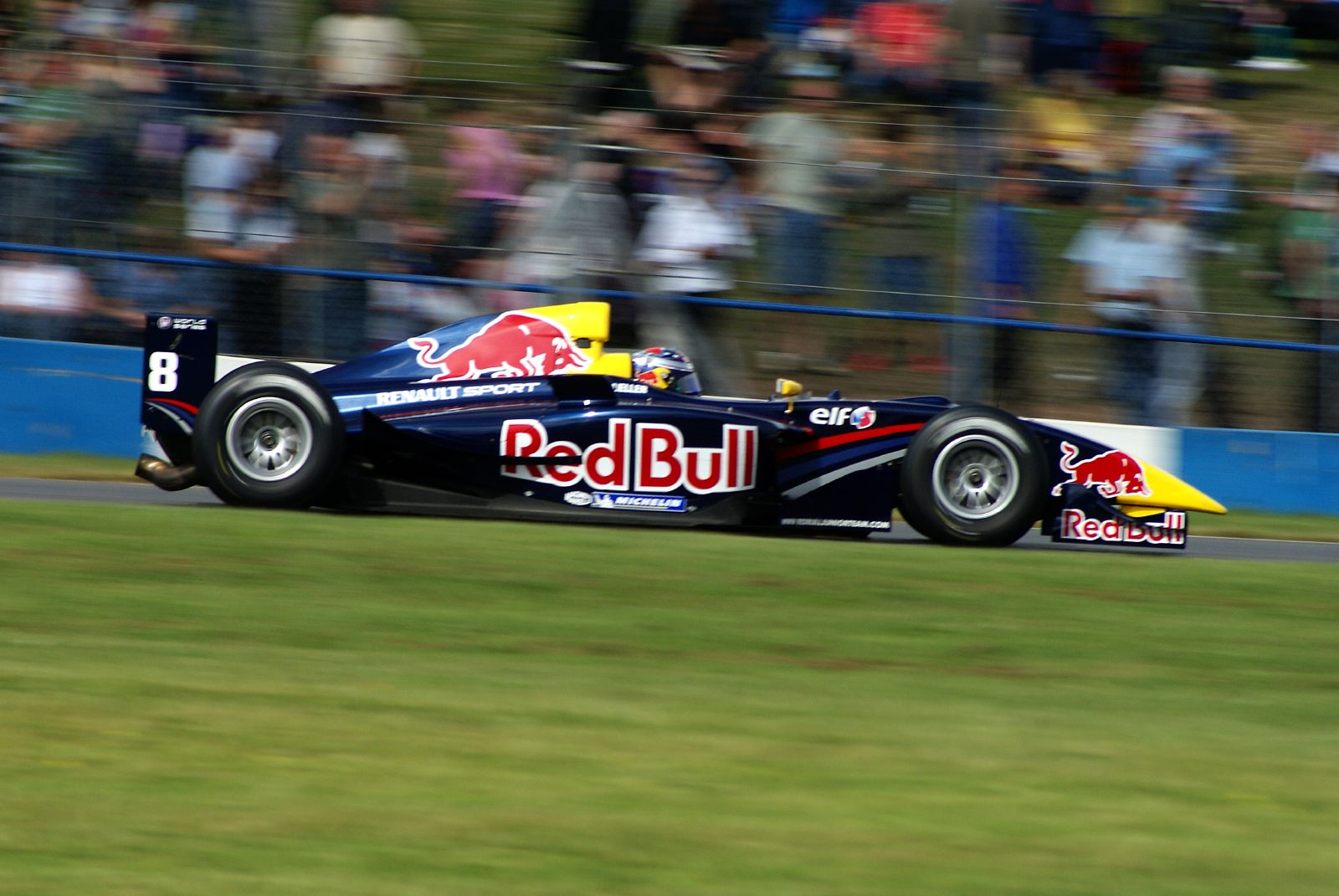
Ammermüller driving for Carlin Motorsport in the Donington Park round of the 2007 Formula Renault 3.5 Series season.

Ammermüller's 2007 GP2 Series season was disrupted by injury, and he was rested in favour of Sébastien Buemi. However, Sebastian Vettel's move to the Scuderia Toro Rosso F1 team left his Formula Renault 3.5 Series seat vacant, which Ammermüller took.

In 2008, Ammermüller raced in the International Formula Master series.

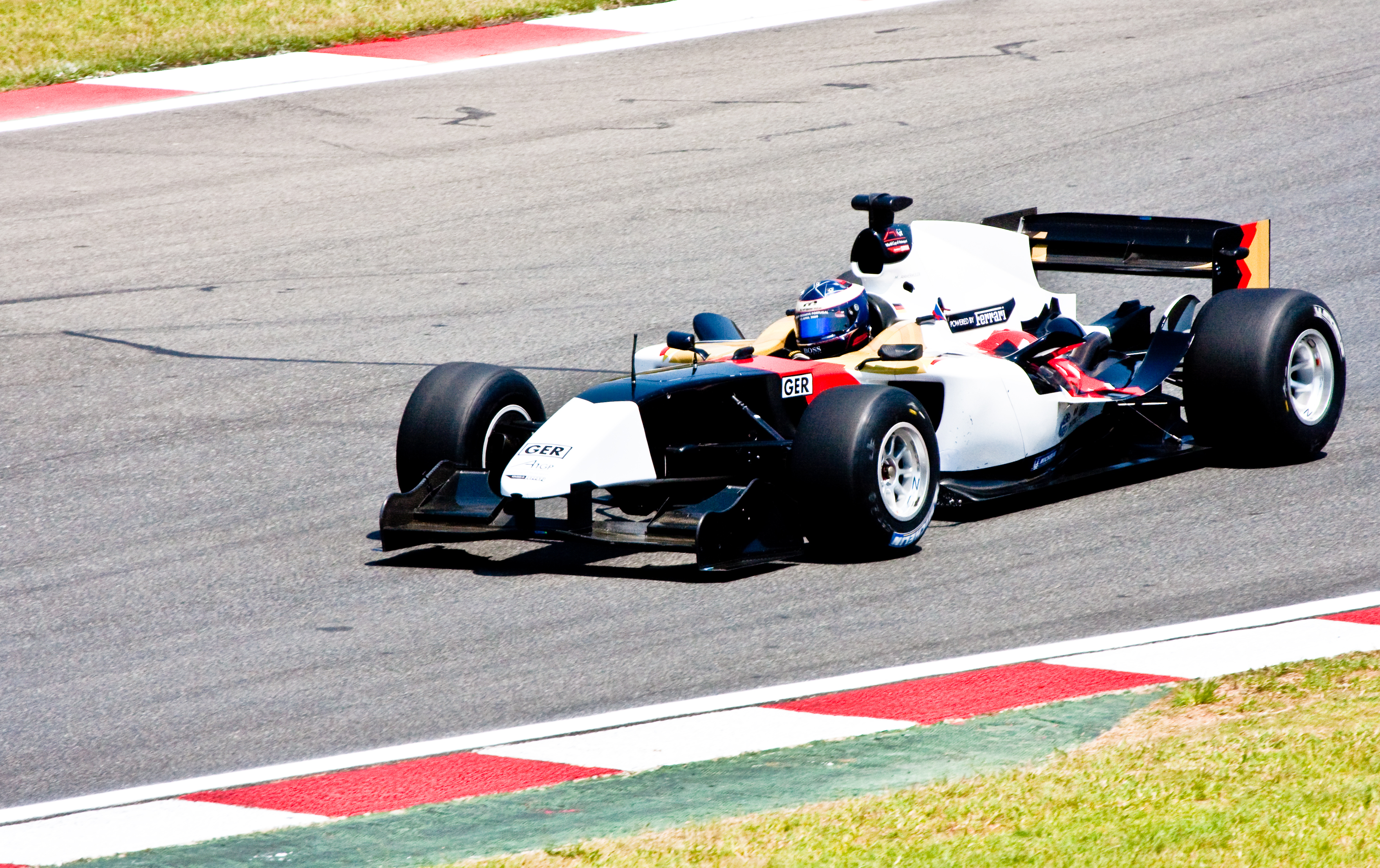
Ammermüller competing for A1 Team Germany at the 2008–09 A1 Grand Prix of Nations, South Africa.

== A1 Grand Prix ==
In 2007–08, Ammermüller drove in A1 Grand Prix for Germany. In the 2007–08 season's third race at Sepang, he collided with three cars at turn two in three separate incidents, the first of which took third position from Canada's Robert Wickens in the sprint race. It was deemed avoidable contact, so Ammermüller was demoted to 16th, with Wickens reclaiming third. In the feature race, he collided again with Britain's Oliver Jarvis. He was given a drive-through penalty. Despite this, he made contact at turn two once again with Czech Republic's Erik Janiš, and as a result, was disqualified from the race. On the back of these incidents, he was given the nickname "Hammermüller".

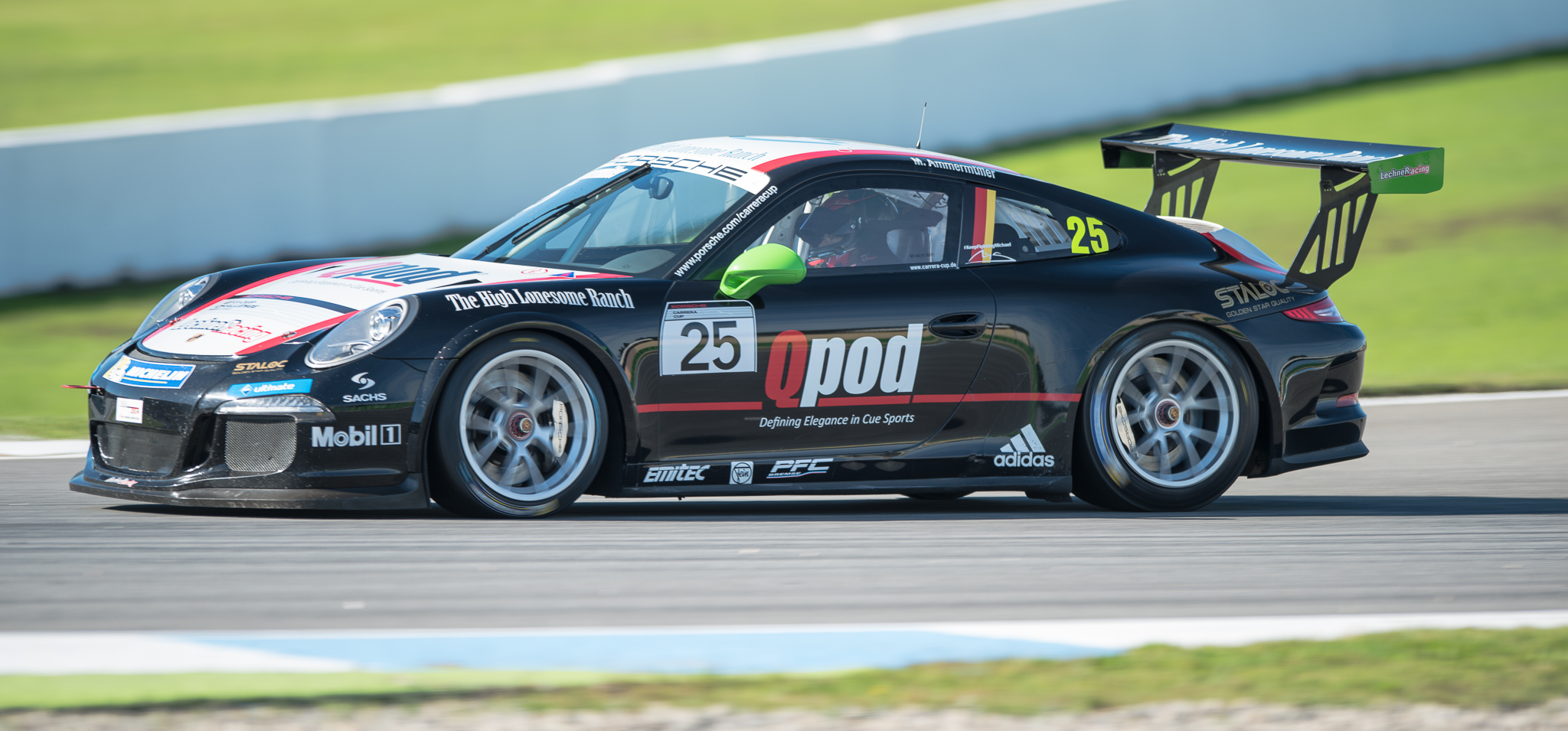
Ammermüller competing in the German Carrera Cup.

Despite the disqualification, Ammermüller scored his maiden victory three weeks later at Zhuhai.

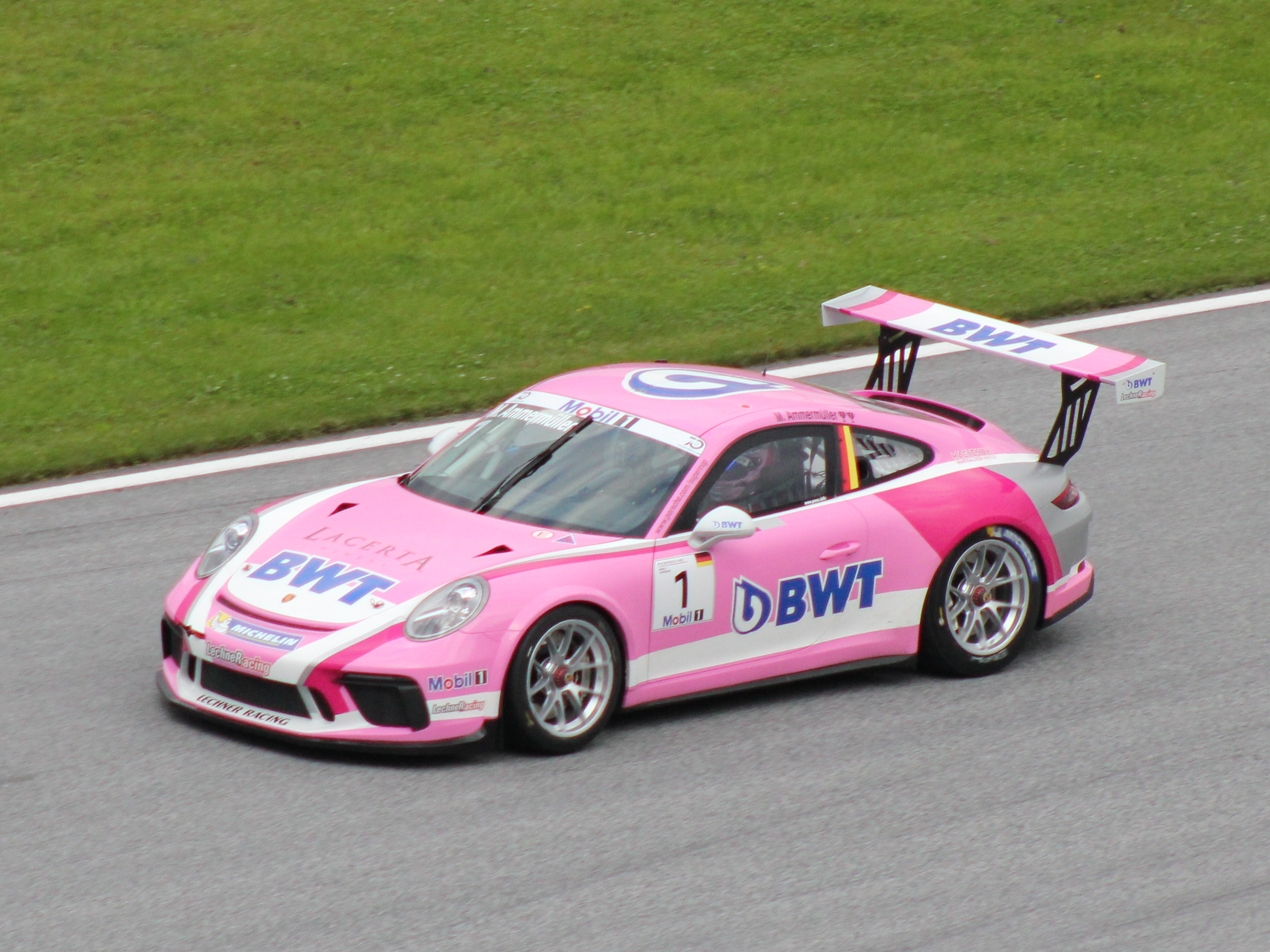
Ammermüller at the Red Bull Ring in 2018

== Racing record ==
=== Career summary ===
Season	Series	Team	Races	Wins	Poles	FLaps	Podiums	Points	Position
2004	Eurocup Formula Renault 2.0	Jenzer Motorsport	17	0	0	0	0	64	11th
2004	Formula Renault 2.0 Germany	Jenzer Motorsport	14	0	1	2	5	238	**3rd**
2004	Formula Renault 2.0 Italy	Jenzer Motorsport	2	0	1	0	2	0	NC
2005	Eurocup Formula Renault 2.0	Jenzer Motorsport	16	6	6	4	10	149	**2nd**
2005	Formula Renault 2.0 Italy	Jenzer Motorsport	15	3	2	3	11	266	**2nd**
2006	GP2 Series	Arden International Ltd	21	1	0	0	3	25	11th
2006	Formula One	Red Bull Racing	Third driver						
2007	GP2 Series	ART Grand Prix	6	0	0	1	0	1	26th
2007	Formula Renault 3.5 Series	Carlin Motorsport	5	0	1	0	0	12	22nd
2007	Formula One	Red Bull Racing	Test driver						
2007-08	A1 Grand Prix	A1 Team Germany	14	1	1	0	2	83	8th
2008	International Formula Master	Iris Project	14	1	0	0	6	74	**3rd**
2008	International Formula Master	Trident Racing	2	0	0	0	0	74	**3rd**
2008-09	A1 Grand Prix	A1 Team Germany	4	0	0	0	0	2	21st
2010	ADAC GT Masters	Team Rosberg	14	0	0	0	1	28	12th
2010	FIA GT3 European Championship	Team Rosberg	8	0	0	0	0	6	29th
2010	24 Hours of Nürburgring - SP9	Black Falcon	1	0	0	0	0	N/A	DNF
2011	ADAC GT Masters	a-workx Akrapovic	16	1	0	0	2	64	16th
2012	Porsche Supercup	Lechner Racing	10	0	0	1	2	103	6th
2012	Porsche Carrera Cup Germany	Lechner Racing	9	0	0	0	1	82	11th
2012	24 Hours of Nürburgring - SP9	Mamerow Racing	1	0	0	0	1	N/A	**2nd**
2013	Porsche Supercup	Lechner Racing	9	0	0	1	4	115	**3rd**
2013	Blancpain Endurance Series - Pro	Saintéloc Racing	2	0	0	0	0	0	NC
2013	FIA GT Series - Pro-Am	Team Novadriver	4	0	1	0	3	38	11th
2013	24 Hours of Nürburgring - SP9	Phoenix Racing	1	0	0	0	0	N/A	7th
2014	Porsche Supercup	Walter Lechner Racing	10	1	0	3	3	114	**3rd**
2014	Porsche Carrera Cup Germany	QPOD Walter Lechner Racing	18	6	5	1	10	231	**2nd**
2015	Porsche Supercup	Lechner Racing Middle East	11	1	3	3	5	124	**3rd**
2015	Porsche Carrera Cup Germany	The Heart of Racing by Lechner	17	0	0	0	6	182	4th
2016	Porsche Supercup	Lechner MSG Racing Team	10	0	0	0	3	129	4th
2016	Porsche Carrera Cup Germany	KÜS TEAM75 Bernhard	2	2	1	1	2	40	11th
2017	Porsche Supercup	Lechner MSG Racing Team	11	4	2	3	10	193	**1st**
2017	Porsche Carrera Cup Germany	raceunion Huber Racing	14	1	3	2	6	177	**3rd**
2017	ADAC GT Masters	KÜS TEAM75 Bernhard	14	1	1	1	2	91	8th
2018	Porsche Supercup	BWT Lechner Racing	10	1	4	3	7	153	**1st**
2018	Porsche Carrera Cup Germany	BWT Lechner Racing	14	2	2	2	10	242	**2nd**
2019	Porsche Supercup	BWT Lechner Racing	10	4	3	1	7	150	**1st**
2019	Porsche Carrera Cup Germany	BWT Lechner Racing	16	6	7	4	13	260	**2nd**
2020	ADAC GT Masters	SSR Performance	14	3	2	1	4	181	**1st**
2021	ADAC GT Masters	SSR Performance	14	4	0	0	6	195	**2nd**
2021	Deutsche Tourenwagen Masters	SSR Performance	2	0	0	0	0	0	NC†
2022	Porsche Supercup	SSR Huber Racing	5	0	0	0	0	19	16th
2022	Porsche Carrera Cup Germany	SSR Huber Racing	8	0	0	1	1	66	13th

^{†} As Ammermüller was a guest driver, he was ineligible to score points. ^{*} Season still in progress.

=== Complete Formula Renault 2.0 Germany results ===
(key) (Races in bold indicate pole position; races in italics indicate fastest lap)

Year	Entrant	1	2	3	4	5	6	7	8	9	10	11	12	13	14	DC	Points
2004	Jenzer Motorsport	OSC; 1; 2	**OSC**; **2**; 14	ASS; 1; 7	ASS; 2; 6	SAL; 1; 5	SAL; 2; 6	SAC; 1; 13	SAC; 2; 3	NÜR; 1; 2	NÜR; 2; 4	LAU; 1; 4	LAU; 2; 3	OSC; 1; 5	OSC; 2; 2	3rd	238

=== Complete Eurocup Formula Renault 2.0 results ===
(key) (Races in bold indicate pole position; races in italics indicate fastest lap)

Year	Entrant	1	2	3	4	5	6	7	8	9	10	11	12	13	14	15	16	17	DC	Points
2004	Jenzer Motorsport	MNZ; 1; 17	MNZ; 2; 6	VAL; 1; 15	VAL; 2 Ret	MAG; 1; 15	MAG; 2; 6	HOC; 1; 9	HOC; 2 Ret	BRN; 1; 8	BRN; 2; 8	DON; 1; 9	DON; 2; 12	SPA; 8	IMO; 1; 7	IMO; 2; 9	OSC; 1; 12	OSC; 2 Ret	11th	64
2005	Jenzer Motorsport	**ZOL**; **1**; 1	**ZOL**; **2**; 1	**VAL**; **1**; 1	**VAL**; **2**; 1	LMS; 1; 3	LMS; 2; 6	**BIL**; **1**; 1	BIL; 2; 2	OSC; 1; 21	**OSC**; **2**; 1	DON; 1 Ret	DON; 2; 3	EST; 1; 2	EST; 2 Ret	MNZ; 1 Ret	MNZ; 2 Ret		2nd	149

=== Complete Formula Renault 2.0 Italia results ===
(key) (Races in bold indicate pole position; races in italics indicate fastest lap)

Year	Entrant	1	2	3	4	5	6	7	8	9	10	11	12	13	14	15	16	17	DC	Points
2004	Jenzer Motorsport	VLL; 1	VLL; 2	VAR	MAG	SPA; 1	SPA; 2	MNZ; 1	MNZ; 2	MNZ; 3	MIS; 1	MIS; 2	MIS; 3	ADR	HOC; 1	HOC; 2	**MNZ**; **1**; 2	MNZ; 2; 3	NC	-
2005	Jenzer Motorsport	VLL; 1; 1	VLL; 2; 2	IMO; 1; 2	IMO; 2; 2	SPA; 1; 1	SPA; 2; 1	MNZ; 1; 2	MNZ; 2; 2	MNZ; 3 Ret	MUG; 1	MUG; 2	**MIS**; **1**; 2	MIS; 2; 20	MIS; 3; 2	VAR; 11	MNZ; 1; 4	MNZ; 2; 3	2nd	230

=== Complete GP2 Series results ===
(key) (Races in bold indicate pole position) (Races in italics indicate fastest lap)

Year	Entrant	1	2	3	4	5	6	7	8	9	10	11	12	13	14	15	16	17	18	19	20	21	DC	Points
2006	Arden International Ltd	VAL; FEA; 7	VAL; SPR; 1	IMO; FEA; 2	IMO; SPR; Ret	NÜR; FEA; 10	NÜR; SPR; 6	CAT; FEA; 3	CAT; SPR; 8	MON; FEA; 7	SIL; FEA; Ret	SIL; SPR; Ret	MAG; FEA; 12	MAG; SPR; 8	HOC; FEA; 9	HOC; SPR; Ret	HUN; FEA; Ret	HUN; SPR; 11	IST; FEA; 13	IST; SPR; Ret	MNZ; FEA; 12	MNZ; SPR; Ret	11th	25
2007	ART Grand Prix	BHR; FEA; 10	BHR; SPR; 7	CAT; FEA	CAT; SPR	MON; FEA	MAG; FEA; Ret	MAG; SPR; 19	SIL; FEA; 10	SIL; SPR; 12	NÜR; FEA	NÜR; SPR	HUN; FEA	HUN; SPR	IST; FEA	IST; SPR	MNZ; FEA	MNZ; SPR	SPA; FEA	SPA; SPR	VAL; FEA	VAL; SPR	26th	1

=== Complete Formula One participations ===
(key)

Year	Entrant	Chassis	Engine	1	2	3	4	5	6	7	8	9	10	11	12	13	14	15	16	17	18	WDC	Points
2006	Red Bull Racing	Red Bull RB2	Ferrari 056 2.4 V8	BHR	MAL	AUS	SMR	EUR	ESP	MON	GBR	CAN	USA	FRA	GER	HUN	TUR	ITA	CHN; TD	JPN; TD	BRA; TD	–	–

=== Complete Formula Renault 3.5 Series results ===
(key) (Races in bold indicate pole position) (Races in italics indicate fastest lap)

Year	Entrant	1	2	3	4	5	6	7	8	9	10	11	12	13	14	15	16	17	DC	Points
2007	Carlin Motorsport	MNZ; 1	MNZ; 2	NÜR; 1	NÜR; 2	MON; 1	HUN; 1	HUN; 2	SPA; 1; 10	**SPA**; **2** DNS	DON; 1; 6	DON; 2; 5	MAG; 1 Ret	MAG; 2; 15	EST; 1	EST; 2	CAT; 1	CAT; 2	22nd	12

=== Complete A1 Grand Prix results ===
(key) (Races in bold indicate pole position) (Races in italics indicate fastest lap)

Year	Entrant	1	2	3	4	5	6	7	8	9	10	11	12	13	14	15	16	17	18	19	20	DC	Points
2007–08	Germany	NED; SPR	NED; FEA	CZE; SPR	CZE; FEA	MYS; SPR; 16	MYS; FEA; EX	**CHN**; **SPR**; 1	CHN; FEA; 4	NZL; SPR	NZL; FEA	AUS; SPR; 4	AUS; FEA; 7	RSA; SPR; EX	RSA; FEA; Ret	MEX; SPR; Ret	MEX; FEA; 20	CHN; SPR; 6	CHN; FEA; 10	GBR; SPR; 20	GBR; SPR; Ret	8th	83
2008–09	Germany	NED; SPR	NED; FEA	CHN; SPR	CHN; FEA	MYS; SPR	MYS; FEA	NZL; SPR	NZL; FEA	RSA; SPR; 14	RSA; FEA; 11	POR; SPR	POR; FEA	GBR; SPR; 11	GBR; SPR; Ret							21st	2

=== Complete International Formula Master results ===
(key) (Races in bold indicate pole position) (Races in italics indicate fastest lap)

Year	Entrant	1	2	3	4	5	6	7	8	9	10	11	12	13	14	15	16	DC	Points
2008	Iris Project	VAL; 1; 3	VAL; 2; 5	PAU; 1; 4	PAU; 2; 5	BRN; 1; 2	BRN; 2; 4	EST; 1; 3	EST; 2; 8	BRH; 1; 6	BRH; 2; 1	OSC; 1; 3	OSC; 2; 3	IMO; 1; 5	IMO; 2; 5			3rd	74
2008	Trident Racing															MNZ; 1; 9	MNZ; 2; 5	3rd	74

=== Complete ADAC GT Masters Results ===
(key) (Races in bold indicate pole position) (Races in italics indicate fastest lap)

Year	Team	Car	1	2	3	4	5	6	7	8	9	10	11	12	13	14	15	16	DC	Points
2010	Team Rosberg	Audi R8 LMS	OSC; 1; 10	OSC; 2; 9	SAC; 1; 7	SAC; 2; 16	HOC; 1; 6	HOC; 2; 7	ASS; 1; 9	ASS; 2; 10	LAU; 1; 5	LAU; 2; 9	NÜR; 1; 4	NÜR; 2; 8	OSC; 1; 3	OSC; 2; 4			12th	28
2011	a-workx Akrapovic	Porsche 911 GT3 R (997)	OSC; 1; 11	OSC; 2 Ret	SAC; 1; 3	SAC; 2; 8	ZOL; 1; 10	ZOL; 2; 27	NÜR; 1; 4	NÜR; 2; 10	RBR; 1; 7	RBR; 2 Ret	LAU; 1; 1	LAU; 2 Ret	ASS; 1; 16	ASS; 2; 21	HOC; 1 Ret	HOC; 2; 11	16th	64
2017	KÜS TEAM75 Bernhard	Porsche 911 GT3 R (991)	**OSC**; **1**; 1	OSC; 2 Ret	LAU; 1; 7	LAU; 2 Ret	RBR; 1; 7	RBR; 2; 9	ZAN; 1; 8	ZAN; 2; 5	NÜR; 1; 2	NÜR; 2; 10	SAC; 1; 10	SAC; 2; 11	HOC; 1; 4	HOC; 2; 7			8th	91
2020	SSR Performance	Porsche 911 GT3 R (991.2)	LAU; 1; 2	LAU; 2; 4	**NÜR**; **1**; 1	NÜR; 2; 16	HOC; 1; 1	HOC; 2; 18	SAC; 1; 6	SAC; 2; 6	RBR; 1; 5	RBR; 2; 4	LAU; 1; 6	LAU; 2; 11	**OSC**; **1**; 1	OSC; 2; 4			**1st**	**181**
2021	SSR Performance	Porsche 911 GT3 R (991.2)	OSC; 1; 7	**OSC**; **2**; 1	RBR; 1; 1	RBR; 2; 6	ZAN; 1; 6	ZAN; 2; 18	LAU; 1; 13	LAU; 2; 12	**SAC**; **1**; 1	SAC; 2; 10	HOC; 1; 3	HOC; 2; 8	NÜR; 1; 2	NÜR; 2; 1			**2nd**	**195**

=== Complete Porsche Supercup results ===
(key) (Races in bold indicate pole position) (Races in italics indicate fastest lap)

Year	Team	1	2	3	4	5	6	7	8	9	10	11	Pos.	Points
2012	Veltins Lechner Racing	BHR; 4	BHR; 15	MON; 6	VAL; Ret	SIL; 7	HOC; 2	HUN; 2	HUN; 4	SPA; 8	MNZ; 9		6th	102
2013	Walter Lechner Racing	CAT; 3	MON; 3	SIL; 2	GER; 5	HUN; 14	SPA; 5	MNZ; 2	UAE; 6	UAE; 8			3rd	115
2014	Lechner Racing Team	CAT; DNS	MON; 3	RBR; 5	SIL; 5	GER; 5	HUN; 5	SPA; Ret	MNZ; 5	USA; 2	USA; 1		3rd	114
2015	Lechner Racing Middle East	**CAT**; 1	MON; 5	RBR; 9	SIL; 3	HUN; 7	**SPA**; Ret	SPA; 6	**MNZ**; 3	MNZ; 3	USA; C	USA; 2	3rd	124
2016	Lechner MSG Racing Team	CAT; 5	MON; 3	RBR; 9	SIL; 13	HUN; 3	HOC; 6	SPA; 5	MNZ; 2	USA; 4	USA; 5		4th	129
2017	Lechner MSG Racing Team	CAT; 1	CAT; 1	**MON**; 1	RBR; 2	SIL; 2	**HUN**; 1	SPA; 3	SPA; 2	MNZ; 10	MEX; 2	MEX; 2	1st	193
2018	BWT Lechner Racing	**CAT**; 1	MON; 2	RBR; 7	SIL; 2	HOC; 3	HUN; 6	SPA; 6	**MNZ**; 2	**MEX**; 2	**MEX**; 3		1st	153
2019	BWT Lechner Racing	CAT; 3	**MON**; 1	RBR; 2	SIL; 6	HOC; Ret	HUN; 1	SPA; 8	MNZ; 2	**MEX**; 1	**MEX**; 1		1st	150
2022	SSR Huber Racing	IMO; 12	MON; 6	SIL; 16	RBR; 14	LEC; 21	SPA	ZND	MNZ				16th	19

Sporting positions
Preceded by Sven Müller	Porsche Supercup; Champion; 2017-2019	Succeeded by Larry ten Voorde
Preceded by Kelvin van der Linde; Patric Niederhauser	ADAC GT Masters; Champion; 2020; With: Christian Engelhart	Succeeded by Ricardo Feller; Christopher Mies
