= Kohei Hirate =

Japanese racing driver

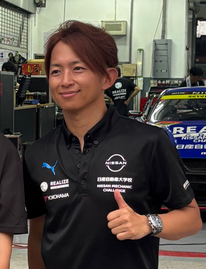
- Hirate at the 2025 Super GT Malaysia Festival
- Nationality: Japanese
- Born: 24 March 1986 (age 40) Komaki, Aichi, Japan

Super GT - GT300 career
- Debut season: 2008
- Categorisation: FIA Platinum
- Former teams: Kondo Racing, HELM Motorsports
- Starts: 23
- Wins: 1
- Best finish: 2nd in 2025

Previous series
- 2009-23 2008–13 2007 2004–06 2004 2003–04 2003–04 2003 2003 2002: Super GT - GT500; Super Formula; GP2 Series; Formula 3 Euro Series; Asian Formula Renault; FR2000 Germany; FR2000 Italia; FR2000 Netherlands; FR2000 Masters; Formula Toyota

Championship titles
- 2013 & 2016: Super GT - GT500

Kohei Hirate (平手 晃平, Hirate Kōhei; born 24 March 1986 in Komaki, Aichi) is a Japanese race car driver. Hirate has won the Super GT series twice.

== Career ==
Hirate began karting in 1999 when he was 13. After winning the All Japan Junior Kart Championship, coming third and fifth in the All Japan Kart Championship and coming third in the FIA Oceania Championship, he moved on to Formula Toyota, where he raced for the Tom's Spirit team and came second with four wins to his name.

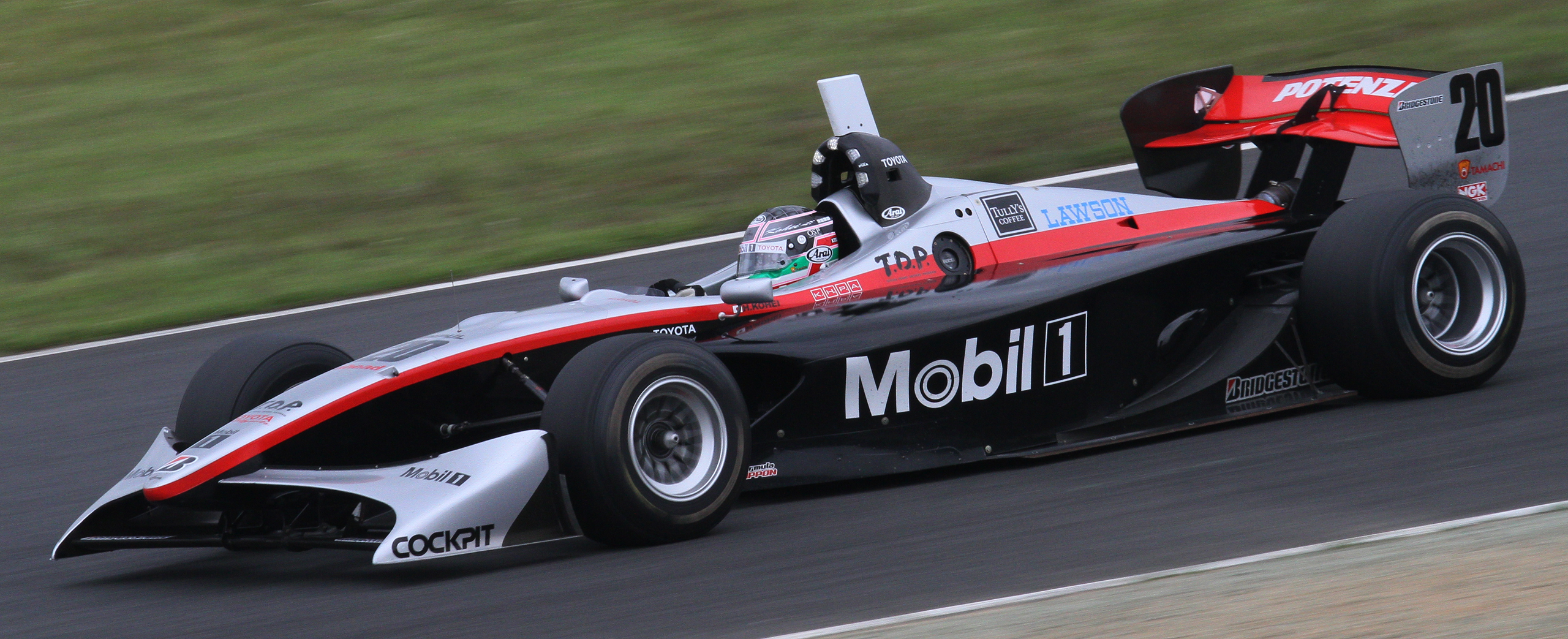
Hirate during free practice for the first Motegi round of the 2010 Formula Nippon season

In 2003, Hirate moved to Formula Renault, at the Prema Power team. In his two-year spell here, he won seven races and came second in the 2004 season. In 2004, he also raced for Prema Power's Formula Three Euroseries team twice, and in 2005 made the decision to race here. After coming twelfth for Team Rosberg, he was made a Toyota F1 test driver in 2006 and came third in the Formula Three Euroseries. In 2007, he continued as a Toyota test driver and also drove for GP2 team Trident Racing.

Hirate returned to Japan in 2008, where he competed in both Formula Nippon and Super GT. He finished fourth in the 2008 Formula Nippon season and fifth in 2009, both times driving for Team Impul.

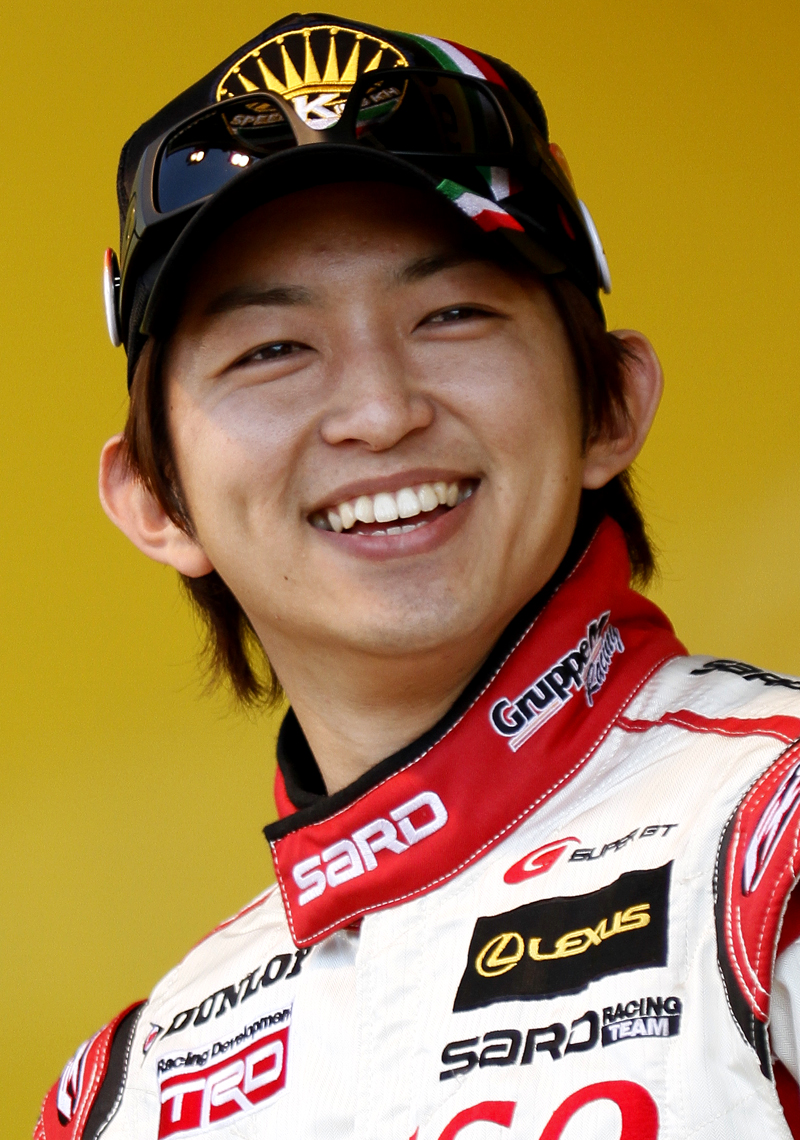
Hirate at the 2010 Fuji 400km Super GT race

== Racing record ==
=== Career summary ===
Season	Series	Team	Races	Wins	Poles	F/Laps	Podiums	Points	Position
2002	Formula Toyota	TOM'S Spirit	?	4	2	?	?	?	**2nd**
2003	Formula Renault 2000 Italia	Prema Powerteam	12	1	0	1	2	113	8th
2003	Formula Renault 2000 Masters	Prema Powerteam	8	0	0	0	0	8	21st
2003	Formula Renault 2000 Germany	Franken Racing	4	0	0	0	0	33	24th
2003	Formula Renault 2000 Netherlands	?	?	?	?	?	?	15	21st
2004	Formula 3 Euro Series	Prema Powerteam	4	0	0	0	0	0	28th
2004	Bahrain Superprix	Prema Powerteam	1	0	0	0	0	N/A	12th
2004	Formula Renault 2000 Italia	Prema Powerteam	15	6	6	2	10	266	**2nd**
2004	Formula Renault 2000 Germany	Prema Powerteam	2	0	0	0	0	25	25th
2004	Asian Formula Renault Challenge	Asia Racing Team	1	0	0	0	0	0	NC
2005	Formula 3 Euro Series	Team Rosberg	20	0	0	0	1	18	11th
2005	Masters of Formula 3	Team Rosberg	1	0	0	0	0	N/A	5th
2005	Macau Grand Prix	Team Rosberg	1	0	0	0	0	N/A	NC
2006	Formula 3 Euro Series	Manor Motorsport	20	1	0	2	5	61	**3rd**
2006	Masters of Formula 3	Manor Motorsport	1	0	0	0	0	N/A	4th
2006	Macau Grand Prix	Manor Motorsport	1	0	0	0	0	N/A	27th
2006	Formula One	Panasonic Toyota Racing	Test driver						
2007	GP2 Series	Trident Racing	21	0	0	0	1	9	19th
2007	Formula One	Panasonic Toyota Racing	Test driver						
2008	Formula Nippon	Team Impul	8	1	0	0	3	42	4th
2008	Super GT - GT300	apr	7	1	1	0	1	33	15th
2009	Formula Nippon	Team Impul	8	0	1	0	2	32	5th
2009	Super GT - GT500	Lexus Team SARD	9	0	0	0	1	27	14th
2010	Formula Nippon	Team Impul	8	1	0	2	2	25.5	5th
2010	Super GT - GT500	Lexus Team SARD	8	0	0	0	0	12	12th
2011	Formula Nippon	Team Impul	8	0	0	1	1	15	8th
2011	Super GT - GT500	Lexus Team Cerumo	8	1	0	0	2	47	6th
2012	Formula Nippon	Project μ/cerumo・INGING	8	0	0	1	0	8	9th
2012	Super GT - GT500	Lexus Team Cerumo	8	2	0	0	3	74	**2nd**
2013	Super Formula	P.mu/cerumo・INGING	7	0	0	0	1	11	9th
2013	Super GT - GT500	Lexus Team Cerumo	8	1	0	0	4	69	**1st**
2014	Super GT - GT500	Lexus Team Cerumo	8	1	0	0	2	43	8th
2015	Super GT - GT500	Lexus Team SARD	8	0	0	1	0	23	13th
2016	Super GT - GT500	Lexus Team SARD	8	1	1	2	4	82	**1st**
2017	Super GT - GT500	Lexus Team SARD	8	1	0	0	2	44	8th
2018	Super GT - GT300	apr	8	0	0	0	4	61	**3rd**
2018	Suzuka 10 Hours	ARN Racing	1	0	0	0	0	N/A	16th
2019	Super GT - GT500	NDDP Racing with B-Max	7	1	0	0	1	36	6th
2020	Super GT - GT500	NDDP Racing with B-Max	8	0	0	0	0	29	13th
2021	Super GT - GT500	NDDP Racing with B-Max	8	0	0	0	1	39	10th
2022	Super GT - GT500	Kondo Racing	7	0	0	0	2	30.5	9th
2022	Super Taikyu - ST-Q	NISMO							
2023	Super GT - GT500	Kondo Racing	7	0	1	0	0	11	16th
2023	Super Taikyu - ST-Q	NISMO	2	2	2	2	2	N/A‡	NC‡
2024	Super GT - GT300	HELM Motorsports	8	0	0	0	0	1	20th
2024	Super Taikyu - ST-Q	NISMO	2	0	1	1	2	N/A‡	NC‡
2025	Super GT - GT300	Kondo Racing	8	0	0	0	2	84	**2nd**
2025	Super Taikyu - ST-Q	NISMO							

- * Season still in progress.

=== Complete Formula Renault 2.0 Italia results ===
(key) (Races in bold indicate pole position) (Races in italics indicate fastest lap)

Year	Entrant	1	2	3	4	5	6	7	8	9	10	11	12	13	14	15	16	17	DC	Points
2003	Prema Powerteam	VLL; 1; 12	VLL; 2; 6	MGI; 4	SPA; 1; 10	SPA; 2; 9	A1R; 1; 1	A1R; 2; 11	MIS; 1; 4	MIS; 2; 3	VAR; 8	ADR; 7	MNZ; Ret						8th	113
2004	Prema Powerteam	**VLL**; **1**; 1	**VLL**; **2**; 23	**VAR**; 1	**MGI**; 1	SPA; 1; 5	SPA; 2; 2	MNZ; 1; 1	MNZ; 2; 1	**MNZ**; **3**; 1	**MIS**; **1** Ret	MIS; 2 DNS	MIS; 3 DNS	ADR; 3	HOC; 1; 2	HOC; 2; 2	MNZ; 1 Ret	MNZ; 2; 13	2nd	266

=== Complete Formula Renault 2.0 Eurocup results ===
(key) (Races in bold indicate pole position) (Races in italics indicate fastest lap)

Year	Entrant	1	2	3	4	5	6	7	8	DC	Points
2003	Prema Powerteam	BRN; 1; 8	BRN; 2; 10	ASS; 1; 17	ASS; 2; 17	OSC; 1; 16	OSC; 2; 27	DON; 1; 27	DON; 2; 13	21st	8

=== Complete Formula 3 Euro Series results ===
(key) (Races in bold indicate pole position; races in italics indicate fastest lap)

Year	Entrant	Chassis	Engine	1	2	3	4	5	6	7	8	9	10	11	12	13	14	15	16	17	18	19	20	DC	Pts
2004	Prema Powerteam	Dallara F304	Opel	HOC1; 1	HOC1; 2	EST; 1	EST; 2	ADR; 1	ADR; 2	PAU; 1	PAU; 2	NOR; 1	NOR; 2	MAG; 1	MAG; 2	NÜR; 1	NÜR; 2	ZAN; 1; 16	ZAN; 2 Ret	BRN; 1	BRN; 2	HOC2; 1; 13	HOC2; 2; 14	28th	0
2005	Team Rosberg	Dallara F305	Opel	HOC; 1; 12	HOC; 2; 11	PAU; 1; 10	PAU; 2; 16	SPA; 1; 5	SPA; 2; 4	MON; 1; 16	MON; 2 Ret	OSC; 1 Ret	OSC; 2; 9	NOR; 1 Ret	NOR; 2 Ret	NÜR; 1; 3	NÜR; 2; 7	ZAN; 1 Ret	ZAN; 2 DSQ	LAU; 1; 17	LAU; 2; 8	HOC; 1; 12	HOC; 2; 10	12th	18
2006	Manor Motorsport	Dallara F305	Mercedes	HOC; 1; 1	HOC; 2; 4	LAU; 1; 18	LAU; 2; 11	OSC; 1; 4	OSC; 2; 2	BRH; 1 DNS	BRH; 2; 17	NOR; 1; 4	NOR; 2 Ret	NÜR; 1; 5	NÜR; 2 Ret	ZAN; 1; 3	ZAN; 2; 13	CAT; 1; 2	CAT; 2; 4	LMS; 1; 5	LMS; 2; 3	HOC; 1; 5	HOC; 2; 7	3rd	61

=== Complete GP2 Series results ===
(key) (Races in bold indicate pole position) (Races in italics indicate fastest lap)

Year	Entrant	1	2	3	4	5	6	7	8	9	10	11	12	13	14	15	16	17	18	19	20	21	DC	Points
2007	Trident Racing	BHR; FEA; 18	BHR; SPR; Ret	CAT; FEA; 13	CAT; SPR; 10	MON; FEA; 12	MAG; FEA; Ret	MAG; SPR; 11	SIL; FEA; 18	SIL; SPR; Ret	NÜR; FEA; 5	NÜR; SPR; 2	HUN; FEA; 11	HUN; SPR; 10	IST; FEA; Ret	IST; SPR; Ret	MNZ; FEA; Ret	MNZ; SPR; 10	SPA; FEA; Ret	SPA; SPR; 13	VAL; FEA; Ret	VAL; SPR; 16	19th	9

=== Complete Formula Nippon/Super Formula results ===
(key) (Races in bold indicate pole position) (Races in italics indicate fastest lap)

Year	Team	Engine	1	2	3	4	5	6	7	8	9	10	11	DC	Points
2008	Team Impul	Toyota	FUJ; Ret	SUZ; 2	MOT; 6	OKA; 3	SUZ1; 5	SUZ2; 1	MOT1; Ret	MOT2; DNS	FUJ1	FUJ2	SUG; 5	4th	42
2009	Team Impul	Toyota	**FUJ**; 3	SUZ; 4	MOT; Ret	FUJ; 5	SUZ; 5	MOT; 8	AUT; 4	SUG; 3				5th	32
2010	Team Impul	Toyota	SUZ; 4	MOT; 7	FUJ; 1	MOT; 3	SUG; 12	AUT; 8	SUZ1; 9	SUZ2; 6				5th	25.5
2011	Team Impul	Toyota	SUZ; 9	AUT; 8	FUJ; 2	MOT; 5	SUZ; C	SUG; 8	MOT1; 7	MOT2; Ret				8th	15
2012	P.mu/cerumo・INGING	Toyota	SUZ; 10	MOT; NC	AUT; 7	FUJ; 7	MOT; 8	SUG; 8	SUZ1; 9	SUZ2; 5				9th	8
2013	P.mu/cerumo・INGING	Toyota	SUZ; 12	AUT; Ret	FUJ; 2	MOT; 15	SUG; Ret	SUZ1; 5	SUZ2; 7					9th	11

=== Complete Super GT results ===
Year	Team	Car	Class	1	2	3	4	5	6	7	8	9	DC	Pts
2008	apr	Toyota MR-S	GT300	SUZ; 13	OKA; 12	FUJ; 1	SEP; 9	SUG; 6	SUZ	MOT	AUT; 9	FUJ; Ret	15th	33
2009	Lexus Team SARD	Lexus SC430	GT500	OKA; 15	SUZ; 10	FUJ; 10	SEP; 13	SUG; 2	SUZ; 7	FUJ; 11	AUT; 12	MOT; 5	14th	27
2010	Lexus Team SARD	Lexus SC430	GT500	SUZ; 5	OKA; 10	FUJ; Ret	SEP; 10	SUG; 10	SUZ; 8	FUJ; C	MOT; 11		12th	12
2011	Lexus Team Cerumo	Lexus SC430	GT500	OKA; 8	FUJ; 5	SEP; 5	SUG; 11	SUZ; 14	FUJ; 1	AUT; 3	MOT; 10		6th	47
2012	Lexus Team Cerumo	Lexus SC430	GT500	OKA; 1	FUJ; 8	SEP; 2	SUG; 5	SUZ; 9	FUJ; 8	AUT; 7	MOT; 1		**2nd**	**74**
2013	Lexus Team Cerumo	Lexus SC430	GT500	OKA; 4	FUJ; 2	SEP; 14	SUG; 11	SUZ; 11	FUJ; 1	AUT; 2	MOT; 3		**1st**	**69**
2014	Lexus Team Cerumo	Lexus RC F	GT500	OKA; 14	FUJ; 2	AUT; 12	SUG; 1	FUJ; 14	SUZ; 8	BUR; 11	MOT; 7		8th	43
2015	Lexus Team SARD	Lexus RC F	GT500	OKA; 5	FUJ; 5	CHA; 7	FUJ; 9	SUZ; 11	SUG; Ret	AUT; 13	MOT; 6		13th	23
2016	Lexus Team SARD	Lexus RC F	GT500	OKA; 7	FUJ; 2	SUG; 2	FUJ; 8	SUZ; 8	CHA; 7	**MOT**; 2	**MOT**; 1		**1st**	**82**
2017	Lexus Team SARD	Lexus LC500	GT500	OKA; 3	FUJ; 7	AUT; 14	SUG; 1	SUZ; 10	FUJ; 13	CHA; 6	MOT; 8		8th	44
2018	apr	Toyota Prius	GT300	OKA; Ret	FUJ; 2	SUZ; 9	CHA; 2	FUJ; 3	SUG; 25	AUT; 10	MOT; 2		**3rd**	**61**
2019	NDDP Racing	Nissan GT-R Nismo GT500	GT500	OKA; 4‡	FUJ; 6	SUZ; 9	CHA; 6	FUJ; 11	AUT; 11	SUG; 1	MOT; DNS		9th	36
2020	NDDP Racing	Nissan GT-R Nismo GT500	GT500	FUJ; 7	FUJ; 8	SUZ; 6	MOT; 7	FUJ; Ret	SUZ; 4	MOT; 15	FUJ; 6		13th	29
2021	NDDP Racing	Nissan GT-R Nismo GT500	GT500	OKA; 9	FUJ; 5	SUZ; 6	MOT; 2	SUG; Ret	AUT; 4	MOT; 14	FUJ; 8		10th	39
2022	Kondo Racing	Nissan Z GT500	GT500	OKA; 14	FUJ; 8	SUZ; 6	FUJ; 3	SUZ; 10	SUG; 14	AUT; 3	MOT; Ret		9th	30.5
2023	Kondo Racing	Nissan Z GT500	GT500	OKA; 14	FUJ; 15	SUZ; 8	**FUJ**; **10**	SUZ; 13	SUG; 5	AUT; 12	MOT; 14		16th	11
2024	HELM Motorsports	Nissan GT-R Nismo GT3	GT300	OKA; 18	FUJ; 10	SUZ; 11	FUJ; 13	SUG; 13	AUT; 17	MOT; 17	SUZ; 16		20th	1
2025	Kondo Racing	Nissan GT-R Nismo GT3	GT300	OKA; 3	FUJ; 7	SEP; 10	FS1 (11)	FS2; 10	SUZ; 8	SUG; 2	AUT; 4	MOT; 4	2nd	84

^{‡} Half points awarded as less than 75% of race distance was completed.
^{(Number)} Driver did not take part in this sprint race, points are still awarded for the teammate's result.
^{*} Season still in progress.

Sporting positions
Preceded by Ronnie Quintarelli; Masataka Yanagida	Super GT (GT500) Champion; 2013 with: Yuji Tachikawa	Succeeded by Tsugio Matsuda; Ronnie Quintarelli
Preceded by Tsugio Matsuda; Ronnie Quintarelli	Super GT (GT500) Champion; 2016 with: Heikki Kovalainen	Succeeded by Ryo Hirakawa; Nick Cassidy
