= Davide Valsecchi =

Italian racing driver

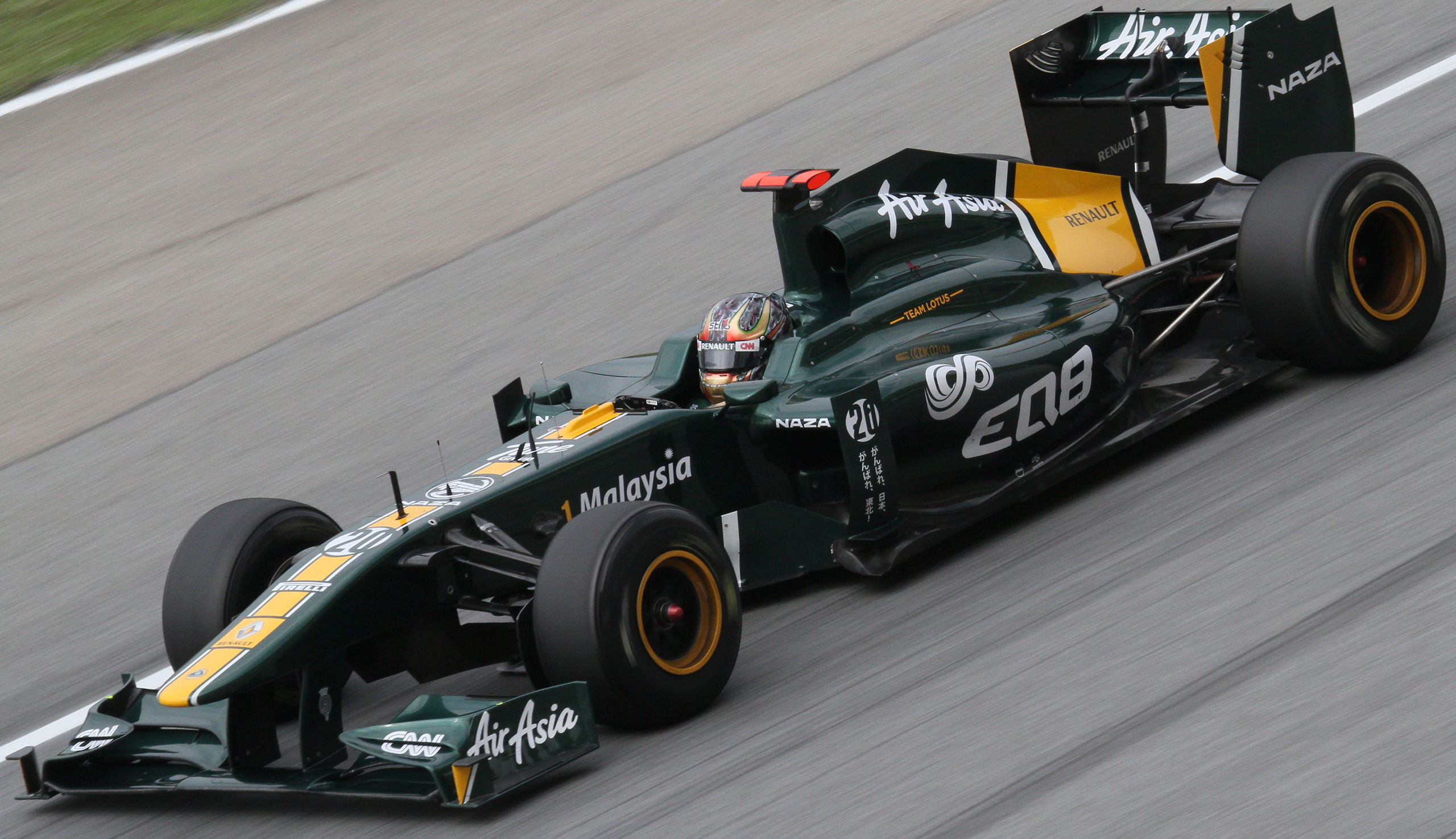
- Valsecchi driving in 2011 with Team Lotus
- Nationality: (Italy) Italian
- Born: 24 January 1987 (age 39) Eupilio (Italy)

GP2 Series career
- Debut season: 2008
- Current team: DAMS
- Categorisation: FIA Platinum
- Car number: 3
- Former teams: Durango; Barwa Addax Team iSport International; Team AirAsia
- Starts: 96
- Wins: 7
- Poles: 3
- Fastest laps: 5
- Best finish: 1st in 2012

Previous series
- 2008–2011 2006–07 2006 2005 2005 2003–05 2003–05 2003–05: GP2 Asia Series; Formula Renault 3.5 Series; Le Mans Series; German Formula Three; 3000 Pro Series; Formula Renault 2.0 Italia; Italian Formula Three; Eurocup Formula Renault 2.0

Championship titles
- 2012 2009–10: GP2 Series; GP2 Asia Series

Davide Valsecchi (born 24 January 1987) is an Italian former racing driver and commentator and analyst for F1 TV and FX Pro Series and Lotus Cup Italia. He is the 2012 GP2 Series champion.

== Career ==
=== Formula Renault ===
Valsecchi drove in Renault-based series from 2003 to 2007, rising from Italian Formula Renault and the Formula Renault Eurocup to the more powerful cars of the World Series by Renault in 2006. He won one race in the categories during this period, in the WSR during the 2007 season.

=== Formula Three ===
From 2003 to 2005, Valsecchi also competed in selected Italian and German Formula Three races, scoring one podium finish in these three years.

=== Formula 3000 ===
In 2005, Valsecchi drove one race in the 3000 Pro Series, a championship for old International Formula 3000 cars.

=== Sports car racing ===
In 2006, Valsecchi competed in three races of the Le Mans Series for the Barazi-Epsilon team in the LMP2 class of the championship, taking a podium finish in each race.

=== GP2 Series ===
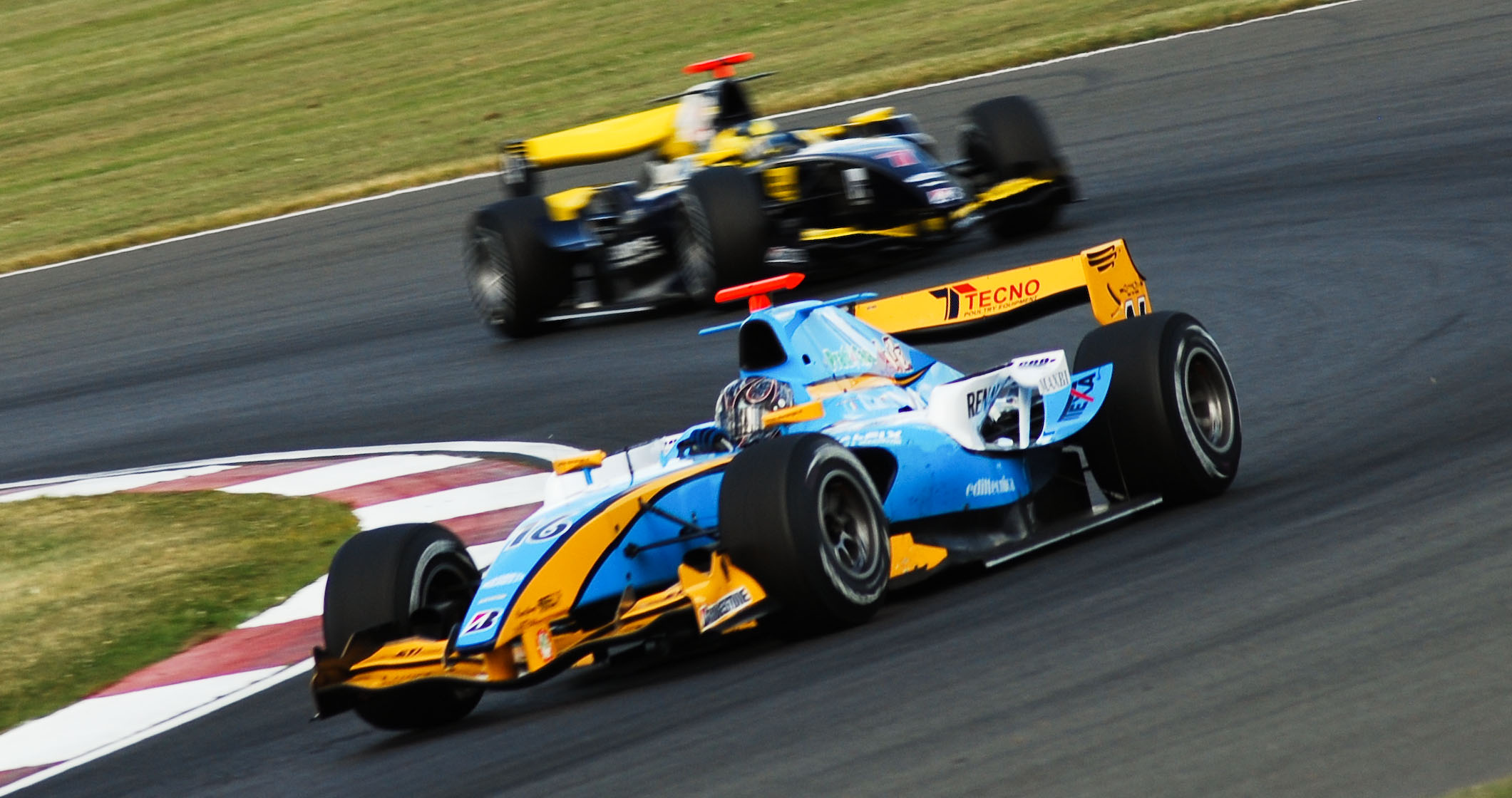
Valsecchi driving for Durango at the Silverstone round of the 2008 GP2 Series season

For 2008, Valsecchi competed in both the GP2 Series and the new GP2 Asia Series for the Durango team, alongside Alberto Valerio. In qualifying for the second round of the GP2 Series at Istanbul, he crashed heavily at 175 mph, but escaped serious injury. However, he did not take part in the rest of the race meeting. Although the car was badly damaged in the crash, GP2 technical director Didier Perrin suspected a braking problem. Valsecchi's evacuation from the wreckage was also hampered by his crotch strap becoming wedged between the foam seat and the chassis, resulting in a technical bulletin being circulated amongst the GP2 teams with instructions on how to fit the strap correctly. Valsecchi suffered mild concussion and a spinal injury, and subsequently missed the next two rounds of the championship. His seat was taken first by compatriot Marcello Puglisi, and then by Ben Hanley. He returned to racing action for the race meeting at Silverstone, where he scored a point in the sprint race. He later crashed his car heavily during the feature race at Spa-Francorchamps, necessitating another visit to hospital, but this time he was uninjured and scored a point in the sprint race the next day. At Monza, Valsecchi won the sprint race, his first GP2 victory.

Valsecchi remained with Durango for the 2008–09 GP2 Asia Series season and the start of the 2009 GP2 Series season, where he was partnered by Carlos Iaconelli/Michael Dalle Stelle and Nelson Panciatici respectively. He also took part in the Renault Driver Development programme. In August 2009, he moved to the Barwa Addax team to replace Formula One-bound Romain Grosjean, alongside Vitaly Petrov. He finished the season in 17th place.

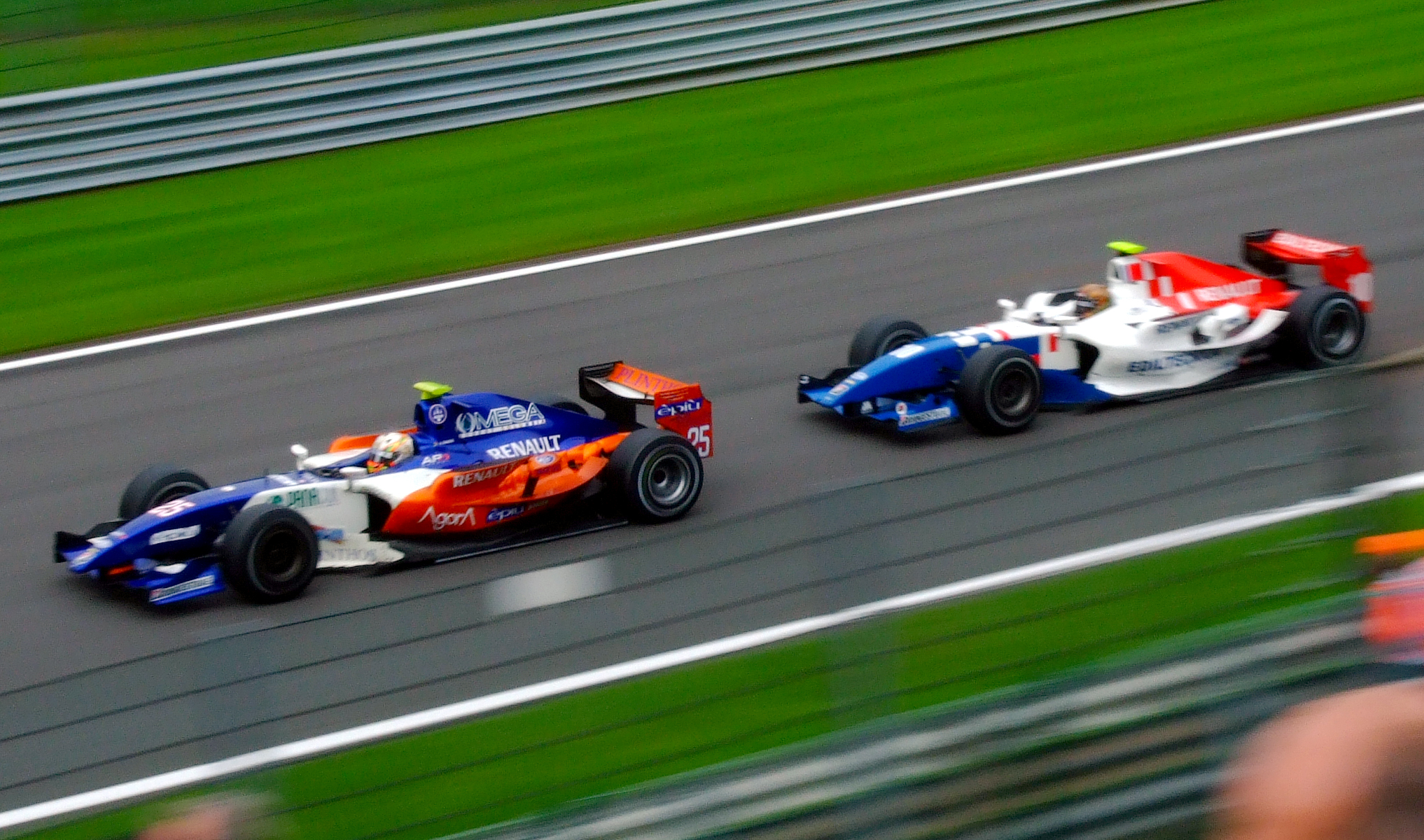
Valsecchi pursuing Adrian Zaugg at the Spa-Francorchamps round of the 2010 GP2 Series season

Valsecchi joined iSport International for the 2009–10 GP2 Asia Series season and for the 2010 GP2 Series season, where he was partnered by Oliver Turvey. Valsecchi won the Asian title, with three races to spare, after taking three wins and two second places in the first five races of the season. In the main series, he dropped behind Turvey, but scored his first pole position and won the final race of the season to take eighth in the drivers' championship, his best performance so far.

For 2011, Valsecchi signed for the new Team AirAsia alongside Luiz Razia, as part of both drivers' test drive deals with the Lotus Formula One team. He finished seventh in the Asia series, losing his championship to Romain Grosjean. In the main series, he took the team's first victory in the Monaco feature race, and also set his first fastest lap in the category. After another double points finish at Valencia, however, he failed to score in the remaining ten races, slipping back to eighth in the championship and equalling his previous year's result.

Valsecchi moved to the DAMS team—which had won the drivers' championship in 2011 with Grosjean—for the 2012 season, where he partnered Felipe Nasr. A strong performer from the start of the year, he established a championship lead by winning three out of the four races held in Bahrain. He lost ground mid-season to former team-mate and title rival Razia, who briefly took the championship initiative, but a strong end to the season, including a win at his home round of the championship at Monza, saw him retake the lead in the standings and ultimately win the drivers' championship with 247 points to Razia's total of 222.

=== Formula One ===
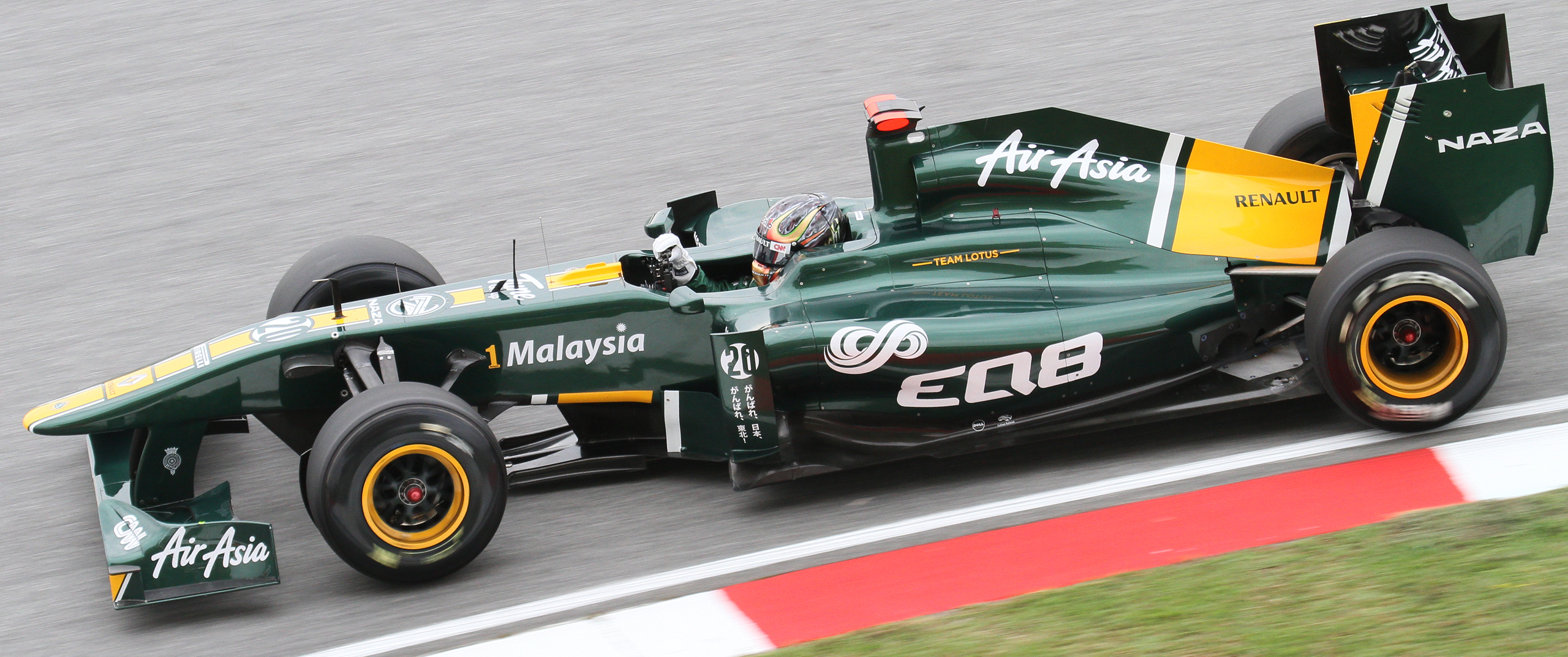
Valsecchi as Team Lotus' third driver at the 2011 Malaysian Grand Prix

Valsecchi tested a Formula One car for the first time on 17 November 2010, at the 2010 season-ending "young drivers" test in Abu Dhabi, with Hispania Racing. He set a best time of 1:43.013, two seconds faster than regular driver Bruno Senna's qualifying time for the Abu Dhabi Grand Prix set on the previous Saturday, although the track conditions had improved in the meantime. Hispania also tested fellow GP2 drivers Pastor Maldonado and Josef Král. He was linked to a reserve drive at Team Lotus for the 2011 season and was confirmed as a Lotus test driver in March of that year. He then drove in Friday practice during the Malaysian Grand Prix weekend in April 2011, replacing Heikki Kovalainen in the morning session.

Having won the 2012 GP2 Series title, Valsecchi aimed to move up into Formula One.

Valsecchi acted as testing and reserve driver for the Lotus F1 Team in 2013 driving for the team during media events. Prior to the 2013 US Grand Prix Lotus driver Kimi Räikkönen announced he would miss the final two races of the season needing emergency back surgery due to an old injury. As reserve driver Valsecchi was expected by many to take the drive. However, with its lucrative place in the constructors' championship on the line, Lotus opted to choose a more experienced driver to fill the position. Wild rumors circulated that drivers such as Michael Schumacher had been approached but ultimately former Caterham and McLaren driver Heikki Kovalainen was chosen to fill the seat. Valsecchi was publicly critical of the decision describing it as a "huge blow". Kovalainen finished the final two races in 14th place, failing to score any points for the Lotus F1 team. Valsecchi's public criticism of the team's decision, lack of large personal sponsorship and a desire to return to a racing position have been cited as reasons for his replacement as reserve driver with Caterham driver Charles Pic for 2014.

In 2014, Valsecchi drove in the GT Open series for Lamborghini.

=== Television ===
Valsecchi is a Sky Sport Formula Two analyst and Sky Sports F1 commentator since 2016 and Top Gear Italia presenter since 2016. Valsecchi has become known for his extremely excitable commentary style. Valsecchi and Matteo Bobbi were temporarily suspended by Sky Italia for making sexist remarks during an on-air post-race analysis of the 2023 Spanish Grand Prix.

== Racing record ==
=== Career summary ===
Season	Series	Team name	Races	Wins	Poles	F/Laps	Podiums	Points	Position
2003	Formula Renault 2000 Italia	RP Motorsport	12	0	0	0	0	24	15th
2003	Formula Renault 2000 Masters	RP Motorsport	1	0	0	0	0	0	NC
2003	Italian Formula 3 Championship	RP Motorsport	1	0	0	0	0	0	NC
2004	Formula Renault 2000 Italia	Cram Competition	15	0	0	0	0	31	14th
2004	Formula Renault 2000 Eurocup	Cram Competition	11	0	0	0	0	2	31st
2004	Italian Formula 3 Championship	Corbetta	2	0	0	0	0	0	NC
2005	Formula Renault 2.0 Italia	RP Motorsport	17	0	1	1	2	104	7th
2005	Eurocup Formula Renault 2.0	RP Motorsport	2	0	0	0	0	0	NC
2005	Italian Formula 3 Championship	Corbetta	3	0	0	0	1	35	7th
2005	German Formula 3 Championship	Corbetta	2	0	0	0	0	0	NC
2005	F3000 International Masters	ADM Motorsport	1	0	0	0	0	3	14th
2006	Formula Renault 3.5 Series	Epsilon Euskadi	15	0	1	0	2	43	10th
2006	Le Mans Series - LMP2	Barazi-Epsilon	3	0	0	0	0	6	15th
2007	Formula Renault 3.5 Series	Epsilon Euskadi	17	1	0	0	2	37	16th
2008	GP2 Series	Durango	14	1	0	0	1	11	15th
2008	GP2 Asia Series	Durango	10	0	0	0	0	17	8th
2008–09	GP2 Asia Series	Durango	11	1	0	0	4	34	4th
2009	GP2 Series	Durango	12	0	0	0	1	12	17th
2009	GP2 Series	Barwa Addax	8	0	0	0	0	12	17th
2009–10	GP2 Asia Series	iSport International	8	3	1	2	6	56	**1st**
2010	GP2 Series	iSport International	20	1	1	0	3	31	8th
2010	Auto GP	RP Motorsport	2	0	0	0	0	0	23rd
2011	GP2 Series	Team AirAsia/Caterham Team AirAsia	18	1	0	1	2	30	8th
2011	GP2 Asia Series	Team AirAsia/Caterham Team AirAsia	4	0	0	0	1	9	7th
2011	Formula One	Team Lotus	Test driver						
2012	GP2 Series	DAMS	24	4	2	5	10	247	**1st**
2013	Formula One	Lotus F1 Team	Test driver						
2014	International GT Open	Eurotech Engineering	0	0	0	0	0	0	NC
2016	Blancpain GT Series Sprint Cup	Attempto Racing	3	0	0	0	0	0	NC
2016	Blancpain GT Series Sprint Cup	GRT Grasser Racing Team	2	0	0	0	0	0	NC
2025	FX Racing Weekend - Supersport GT	Vortex SAS	2	1	0	0	0	0	NC

=== Complete Formula Renault 2.0 Italia results ===
(key) (Races in bold indicate pole position; races in italics indicate fastest lap)

Year	Entrant	1	2	3	4	5	6	7	8	9	10	11	12	13	14	15	16	17	DC	Points
2003	RP Motorsport	VLL; 10	VLL; 9	MGI; 11	SPA; 12	SPA; 13	A1R; 13	A1R; 7	MIS; Ret	MIS; 21	VAR; 6	ADR; 11	MNZ; Ret						15th	24
2004	Cram Competition	VLL; 1; 30	VLL; 2; 22	VAR; 6	MGI; Ret	SPA; 1; 27	SPA; 2; 12	MNZ; 1; 23	MNZ; 2; 9	MNZ; 3; 11	MIS; 1; 13	MIS; 2; 10	MIS; 3 Ret	ADR; 13	HOC; 1	HOC; 2	MNZ; 1; 8	MNZ; 2; 8	14th	31
2005	RP Motorsport	VLL; 1 Ret	VLL; 2 Ret	IMO; 1; 9	IMO; 2; 10	SPA; 1; 10	SPA; 2; 11	MNZ; 1; 9	MNZ; 2; 32	MNZ; 3; 3	MUG; 1; 2	MUG; 2; 6	MIS; 1 Ret	MIS; 2 Ret	MIS; 3; 4	VAR; 9	MNZ; 1; 8	MNZ; 2; 5	7th	86

=== Complete Eurocup Formula Renault 2.0 results ===
(key) (Races in bold indicate pole position; races in italics indicate fastest lap)

Year	Entrant	1	2	3	4	5	6	7	8	9	10	11	12	13	14	15	16	17	DC	Points
2003	RP Motorsport	BRN; 1	BRN; 2	ASS; 1 DNQ	ASS; 2 DNQ	OSC; 1	OSC; 2	DON; 1	DON; 2										NC	0
2004	Cram Competition	MNZ; 1; 11	MNZ; 2 Ret	VAL; 1 Ret	VAL; 2 Ret	MAG; 1; 17	MAG; 2; 26	HOC; 1; 21	HOC; 2; 18	BRN; 1	BRN; 2	DON; 1	DON; 2	SPA; 19	IMO; 1; 10	IMO; 2; 13	OSC; 1	OSC; 2	29th	2
2005	RP Motorsport	ZOL; 1	ZOL; 2	VAL; 1	VAL; 2	LMS; 1	LMS; 2	BIL; 1	BIL; 2	OSC; 1	OSC; 2	DON; 1	DON; 2	EST; 1	EST; 2	MNZ; 1; 14	MNZ; 2; 8		NC†	0

† As Valsecchi was a guest driver, he was ineligible for points

=== Complete Italian Formula Three Championship results ===
(key) (Races in bold indicate pole position; races in italics indicate fastest lap)

Year	Entrant	Chassis	Engine	1	2	3	4	5	6	7	8	9	10	11	12	13	14	DC	Points
2003	RP Motorsport	Dallara F302	Spiess-Opel	MIS	BIN	MGI	IMO	PER	MUG	VAR	MNZ	VLL; Ret						29th	0
2004	Corbetta Angelo	Dallara F304	Mugen-Honda	ADR	MGI	PER	MUG	MUG	IMO	IMO	VAR	MNZ	MNZ	VLL; Ret	VLL; Ret	MIS	MIS	22nd	0
2005	Corbetta Competizioni	Dallara F304	Mugen-Honda	ADR	VLL	IMO	IMO	MUG; 4	MUG; 2	VAR; 4	MNZ	MNZ	ADR	MIS	MIS			7th	35

=== Complete ATS Formel 3 Cup results ===
(key) (Races in bold indicate pole position; races in italics indicate fastest lap)

Year	Entrant	Chassis	Engine	1	2	3	4	5	6	7	8	9	10	11	12	13	14	15	16	17	18	DC	Points
2005	Corbetta Competizioni	Dallara F304	Mugen-Honda	OSC; 1	OSC; 2	HOC; 1	HOC; 2	SAC; 1	SAC; 2	LAU; 1	LAU; 2	NÜR; 1	NÜR; 2	NÜR; 1	NÜR; 2	ASS; 1; 4	ASS; 2; 7	LAU; 1	LAU; 2	OSC; 1	OSC; 2	NC	0

=== Complete 3000 Pro Series results ===
(key) (Races in bold indicate pole position) (Races in italics indicate fastest lap)

Year	Entrant	1	2	3	4	5	6	7	8	DC	Points
2005	ADM Motorsport	VLL	IMO	SPA	MUG	MIS	LAU	ADR	MNZ; 6	15th	3

=== Complete Formula Renault 3.5 Series results ===
(key) (Races in bold indicate pole position) (Races in italics indicate fastest lap)

Year	Entrant	1	2	3	4	5	6	7	8	9	10	11	12	13	14	15	16	17	DC	Points
2006	Epsilon Euskadi	ZOL; 1 DNS	**ZOL**; **2**; 15	MON; 1 DNQ	IST; 1; 5	IST; 2; 3	MIS; 1 Ret	MIS; 2; 3	SPA; 1; 8	SPA; 2 Ret	NÜR; 1; 8	NÜR; 2; 12	DON; 1; 16	DON; 2; 7	LMS; 1; 17	LMS; 2; 5	CAT; 1; 15	CAT; 2 Ret	10th	43
2007	Epsilon Euskadi	MNZ; 1 Ret	MNZ; 2 Ret	NÜR; 1; 8	NÜR; 2; 1	MON; 1; 8	HUN; 1 Ret	HUN; 2 Ret	SPA; 1; 10	SPA; 2; 13	DON; 1; 21	DON; 2; 2	MAG; 1; 8	MAG; 2; 13	EST; 1; 13	EST; 2; 11	CAT; 1; 11	CAT; 2; 9	16th	37

=== Complete GP2 Series results ===
(key) (Races in bold indicate pole position) (Races in italics indicate fastest lap)

Year	Entrant	1	2	3	4	5	6	7	8	9	10	11	12	13	14	15	16	17	18	19	20	21	22	23	24	D.C.	Points
2008	Durango	CAT; FEA; 10	CAT; SPR; 5	IST; FEA; DNS	IST; SPR; DNS	MON; FEA	MON; SPR	MAG; FEA	MAG; SPR	SIL; FEA; 19	SIL; SPR; 6	HOC; FEA; Ret	HOC; SPR; 13	HUN; FEA; Ret	HUN; SPR; 13	VAL; FEA; NC	VAL; SPR; 7	SPA; FEA; Ret	SPA; SPR; 6	MNZ; FEA; 8	MNZ; SPR; 1					15th	11
2009	Durango	CAT; FEA; Ret	CAT; SPR; 16	MON; FEA; 15†	MON; SPR; 18	IST; FEA; 3	IST; SPR; Ret	SIL; FEA; 10	SIL; SPR; 14	NÜR; FEA; 13	NÜR; SPR; 10	HUN; FEA; 5	HUN; SPR; 9													17th	12
2009	Barwa Addax Team													VAL; FEA; 11	VAL; SPR; Ret	SPA; FEA; Ret	SPA; SPR; 8	MNZ; FEA; 14	MNZ; SPR; 9	ALG; FEA; 7	ALG; SPR; 14					17th	12
2010	iSport International	CAT; FEA; 10	CAT; SPR; 11	MON; FEA; Ret	MON; SPR; 16	**IST**; **FEA**; 2	IST; SPR; 4	VAL; FEA; 10	VAL; SPR; 6	SIL; FEA; 7	SIL; SPR; 6	HOC; FEA; 17	HOC; SPR; 18	HUN; FEA; 9	HUN; SPR; 3	SPA; FEA; 18	SPA; SPR; 8	MNZ; FEA; 9	MNZ; SPR; 16	YMC; FEA; 5	YMC; SPR; 1					8th	31
2011	Caterham Team AirAsia	IST; FEA; 16	IST; SPR; 16	CAT; FEA; 4	CAT; SPR; 4	MON; FEA; 1	MON; SPR; 5	VAL; FEA; 3	VAL; SPR; 4	SIL; FEA; 14	SIL; SPR; 17	NÜR; FEA; 13	NÜR; SPR; Ret	HUN; FEA; 16	HUN; SPR; 14	SPA; FEA; 10	SPA; SPR; 10	MNZ; FEA; 20	MNZ; SPR; Ret							8th	30
2012	DAMS	**SEP**; **FEA**; 2	SEP; SPR; Ret	**BHR1**; **FEA**; 1	BHR1; SPR; 1	BHR2; FEA; 1	BHR2; SPR; 3	CAT; FEA; 4	CAT; SPR; 3	MON; FEA; 4	MON; SPR; Ret	VAL; FEA; 18	VAL; SPR; 10	SIL; FEA; 7	SIL; SPR; 2	HOC; FEA; 13	HOC; SPR; 7	HUN; FEA; 2	HUN; SPR; 4	SPA; FEA; 3	SPA; SPR; Ret	MNZ; FEA; 6	MNZ; SPR; 1	MRN; FEA; 4	MRN; SPR; 5	1st	247

==== Complete GP2 Asia Series results ====
(key) (Races in bold indicate pole position) (Races in italics indicate fastest lap)

Year	Entrant	1	2	3	4	5	6	7	8	9	10	11	12	D.C.	Points
2008	Durango	DUB1; FEA; 17	DUB1; SPR; 6	SEN; FEA; Ret	SEN; SPR; 19	SEP; FEA; 4	SEP; SPR; 4	BHR; FEA; 6	BHR; SPR; 6	DUB2; FEA; 14	DUB2; SPR; 4			8th	17
2008–09	Durango	SHI; FEA; 8	SHI; SPR; 1	DUB; FEA; 2	DUB; SPR; C	BHR1; FEA; 5	BHR1; SPR; 2	LSL; FEA; 6	LSL; SPR; 5	SEP; FEA; 8	SEP; SPR; 3	BHR2; FEA; 16	BHR2; SPR; Ret	4th	34
2009–10	iSport International	**YMC1**; **FEA**; 1	YMC1; SPR; 2	YMC2; FEA; 2	YMC2; SPR; 1	BHR1; FEA; 1	BHR1; SPR; 20	BHR2; FEA; 2	BHR2; SPR; 4					1st	56
2011	Team AirAsia	YMC; FEA; 3	YMC; SPR; 4	IMO; FEA; DSQ	IMO; SPR; 17									7th	9

=== Complete Formula One participations ===
(key) (Races in bold indicate pole position) (Races in italics indicate fastest lap)

Year	Entrant	Chassis	Engine	1	2	3	4	5	6	7	8	9	10	11	12	13	14	15	16	17	18	19	WDC	Points
2011	Team Lotus	Lotus T128	Renault RS27 2.4 V8	AUS	MAL; TD	CHN	TUR	ESP	MON	CAN	EUR	GBR	GER	HUN	BEL	ITA	SIN	JPN	KOR	IND	ABU	BRA	–	–

=== Complete Blancpain GT Series Sprint Cup results ===
Year	Team	Car	Class	1	2	3	4	5	6	7	8	9	10	Pos.	Points	Ref
2016	Attempto Racing	Lamborghini Huracán GT3	Pro	MIS; QR; 22	MIS; CR; DNS	BRH; QR; 28	BRH; CR; 28							NC	0	
2016	GRT Grasser Racing Team	Lamborghini Huracán GT3	Pro					NÜR; QR; 17	NÜR; CR; 24	HUN; QR	HUN; CR	CAT; QR	CAT; CR	NC	0	

Sporting positions
Preceded by Kamui Kobayashi	GP2 Asia Series champion 2009–10	Succeeded by Romain Grosjean
Preceded by Romain Grosjean	GP2 Series; Champion; 2012	Succeeded by Fabio Leimer
