= 2005 Formula Renault 2.0 Italia =

Motor racing competition

Seasons
- ← 2004 2006 →

2005 Formula Renault 2.0 Italia was the sixth season of the Italian Formula Renault Championship and the first under the name "Formula Renault 2.0 Italy." Most races were in Italy with one race at the Circuit de Spa-Francorchamps (Belgium). Kamui Kobayashi, who went on to drive in Formula One, won the competition. Jenzer Motorsport won the team competition.

Atte Mustonen won the Winter Series, an off-season championship.

== Drivers and Teams ==
2005 Entry List
Team	No.	Driver name	Rounds
(Italy) BVM Racing	2	(Italy) Federico Muggia	All
(Italy) BVM Racing	6	(Italy) Gary Cester	1–3, 5–8
(Italy) BVM Racing	7	(Italy) Davide Rigon	1–6
(Italy) Cram Competition	3	(Switzerland) Simona de Silvestro	All
(Italy) Cram Competition	4	(Italy) Luca Persiani	1–5
(Italy) Cram Competition	25	(United Kingdom) Ben Hanley	All
(Italy) Cram Competition	29	(United Kingdom) Alexander Russell	All
(Italy) Cram Competition	89	(Italy) Alex Frassineti	6–8
(Italy) Euronova Racing	5	(Italy) Marco Frezza	All
(Italy) Euronova Racing	8	(Italy) Alberto Costa	All
(Italy) Euronova Racing	17	(Belgium) Jérôme d'Ambrosio	All
(Italy) LP Motorsport Competition	9	(Italy) Laura Polidori	2, 4
(Switzerland) Jenzer Motorsport	10	(Colombia) Federico Montoya	1–4, 6–8
(Switzerland) Jenzer Motorsport	11	(Germany) Michael Ammermüller	1–4, 6–8
(Switzerland) Jenzer Motorsport	12	(South Africa) Adrian Zaugg	1–4, 6–8
(Switzerland) Jenzer Motorsport	18	(Austria) Walter Grubmüller	1–4, 6–8
(Switzerland) Jenzer Motorsport	19	(Switzerland) David Oberle	1–4, 6–8
(Italy) Durango Formula	14	(Italy) Niccolò Valentini	6–8
(Italy) Prema Powerteam	15	(Japan) Kamui Kobayashi	1–4, 6–8
(Italy) Prema Powerteam	69	(Italy) Matteo Chinosi	All
(San Marino) W&D Racing	16	(San Marino) Paolo Meloni	1–6, 8
(Italy) IT Loox Racing Car	21	(Italy) Giandomenico Sposito	1–2, 4
(Italy) IT Loox Racing Car	36	(Italy) Nicola Gianniberti	7
(Italy) IT Loox Racing Car	37	(Austria) Reinhard Kofler	2–8
(Italy) IT Loox Racing Car	38	(Italy) Niki Sebastiani	All
(Italy) IT Loox Racing Car	39	(Italy) Valentino Sebastiani	All
(Belgium) Junior Racing Team	22	(Romania) Michael Herck	1
(Italy) CO2 Motorsport	23	(Italy) Cristian Corsini	1–5, 8
(Italy) CO2 Motorsport	32	(Italy) Nicolò Pastore	8
(Italy) CO2 Motorsport	77	(Italy) Enea Casoni	2
(Italy) Alan Racing Team	24	(Italy) Mauro Massironi	Al
(Italy) Alan Racing Team	35	(Italy) Marco Mapelli	8
(Italy) Alan Racing Team	47	(Italy) Moreno Bruzzone	2–4
(Italy) JD Motorsport	26	(Brazil) Carlos Iaconelli	1–2
(Italy) JD Motorsport	28	(Italy) Marcello Puglisi	1–4
(Italy) RP Motorsport	27	(Italy) Davide Valsecchi	All
(Italy) RP Motorsport	31	(Italy) Davide Giampapa	1
(Italy) RP Motorsport	41	(Finland) Mika Leirilaakso	1–5
(Italy) Viola Formula Racing	33	(Italy) Manuele Gatto	1–4
(Italy) M&C Motorsport	42	(Italy) Ercole Mores	4
(Italy) M&C Motorsport	48	(Italy) Stefano Turchetto	All
(Switzerland) Hirschi Racing Team	43	(Switzerland) Jonathan Hirschi	4
(Italy) Facondini Racing	44	(Spain) Oliver Campos-Hull	All
(Italy) Facondini Racing	45	(Italy) Filippo Ponti	1–4
(Italy) Facondini Racing	46	(Spain) Dani Clos	1–4, 6, 8
(Italy) AP Motorsport	49	(Italy) Daniele Rosano	4
(Italy) CEK Team	51	(Italy) Marco Mocci	6
(Italy) CEK Team	88	(Italy) Nicholas Risitano	1–2, 4
(Italy) CEK Team	89	(Italy) Alex Frassineti	1–5

== Calendar ==
Round	Race	Circuit	Date	Pole position	Fastest lap	Winning driver	Winning team
1	R1	(Italy) ACI Vallelunga Circuit	April 10	(Switzerland) David Oberle	(Japan) Kamui Kobayashi	(Germany) Michael Ammermüller	(Switzerland) Jenzer Motorsport
1	R2	(Italy) ACI Vallelunga Circuit	April 10		(Japan) Kamui Kobayashi	(Japan) Kamui Kobayashi	(Italy) Prema Powerteam
2	R1	(Italy) Autodromo Enzo e Dino Ferrari	May 15	(Japan) Kamui Kobayashi	(Japan) Kamui Kobayashi	(Japan) Kamui Kobayashi	(Italy) Prema Powerteam
2	R2	(Italy) Autodromo Enzo e Dino Ferrari	May 15		(Germany) Michael Ammermüller	(Japan) Kamui Kobayashi	(Italy) Prema Powerteam
3	R1	(Belgium) Circuit de Spa-Francorchamps	June 11	(Japan) Kamui Kobayashi	(Germany) Michael Ammermüller	(Germany) Michael Ammermüller	(Switzerland) Jenzer Motorsport
3	R2	(Belgium) Circuit de Spa-Francorchamps	June 12		(Germany) Michael Ammermüller	(Germany) Michael Ammermüller	(Switzerland) Jenzer Motorsport
4	R1	(Italy) Autodromo Nazionale Monza	June 25	(Japan) Kamui Kobayashi	(Japan) Kamui Kobayashi	(Japan) Kamui Kobayashi	(Italy) Prema Powerteam
4	R2	(Italy) Autodromo Nazionale Monza	June 26		(Japan) Kamui Kobayashi	(United Kingdom) Ben Hanley	(Italy) Cram Competition
4	R3	(Italy) Autodromo Nazionale Monza	June 26		(Japan) Kamui Kobayashi	(Japan) Kamui Kobayashi	(Italy) Prema Powerteam
5	R1	(Italy) Mugello Circuit	July 10	(Italy) Luca Persiani	(United Kingdom) Ben Hanley	(United Kingdom) Ben Hanley	(Italy) Cram Competition
5	R2	(Italy) Mugello Circuit	July 10		(United Kingdom) Ben Hanley	(United Kingdom) Ben Hanley	(Italy) Cram Competition
6	R1	(Italy) Misano World Circuit	September 3	(Germany) Michael Ammermüller	(Japan) Kamui Kobayashi	(Italy) Davide Rigon	(Italy) BVM Racing
6	R2	(Italy) Misano World Circuit	September 4		(Italy) Davide Valsecchi	(United Kingdom) Ben Hanley	(Italy) Cram Competition
6	R3	(Italy) Misano World Circuit	September 4		(United Kingdom) Ben Hanley	(United Kingdom) Ben Hanley	(Italy) Cram Competition
7	R1	(Italy) Autodromo Riccardo Paletti	September 25	(Belgium) Jérôme d'Ambrosio	(Italy) Federico Muggia	(Belgium) Jérôme d'Ambrosio	(Italy) Euronova Racing
8	R1	(Italy) Autodromo Nazionale Monza	October 22	(Japan) Kamui Kobayashi	(United Kingdom) Ben Hanley	(Japan) Kamui Kobayashi	(Italy) Prema Powerteam
8	R2	(Italy) Autodromo Nazionale Monza	October 23		(Japan) Kamui Kobayashi	(United Kingdom) Ben Hanley	(Italy) Cram Competition

== Championship standings ==
Each championship round included 2 or 3 races by rounds length of 30 minutes each. Points were awarded as follows:

Position	1st	2nd	3rd	4th	5th	6th	7th	8th	9th	10th
Points	30	24	20	16	12	10	8	6	4	2

In each race, 2 additional points were awarded for pole position, and 2 for fastest lap.

=== Drivers ===
Pos	Driver	(Italy) VLL		(Italy) IMO		(Belgium) SPA		(Italy) MNZ1			(Italy) MUG		(Italy) MIS			(Italy) VAR	(Italy) MNZ2		Points
Pos	Driver	1	2	3	4	5	6	7	8	9	10	11	12	13	14	15	16	17	Points
1	(Japan) Kamui Kobayashi	Ret	1	1	1	3	2	1	3*	1			6	2	5	4	1	2	254
2	(Germany) Michael Ammermuller	1	2	2	2	1*	1	2	2	Ret			2	20	2	11	4	3	230
3	(United Kingdom) Ben Hanley	8	19	11	5	4	Ret	11	1	2	1	1	22	1	1	2	2	1	208
4	(Belgium) Jérôme d'Ambrosio	3	5	27	7	2	4	12	6	5	3	7	5	4	7	1	9	4	179
5	(South Africa) Adrian Zaugg	4	3	5	3	28	3	Ret	20	4			4	3	3	12	3	19	142
6	(Italy) Davide Rigon	6	17	3	8	9	5	7	35	30	4	2	1	16	10				113
7	(Italy) Davide Valsecchi	Ret	Ret	9	10	10	11	9	32	3	2	6	Ret	Ret	4	9	8	5	86
8	(Italy) Luca Persiani	5	Ret	4	6	11	12	3	26	32	7	4							74
9	(Italy) Federico Muggia	22	16	14	4	7	6	Ret	33	Ret	8	11	3	23	Ret	Ret	21	7	52
10	(Italy) Gary Cester	25	9	29	30	6	9				6	3	7	Ret	Ret	Ret	28	10	52
11	(Austria) Reinhard Kofler			8	14	5	13	6	22	7	21	8	8	5	8	Ret	10	9	52
12	(Switzerland) David Oberle	26	4	25	21	Ret	Ret	24	4	29			11	24	6	5	6	17	48
13	(Italy) Mauro Massironi	Ret	28	6	11	12	10	10	27	6	5	5	24	19	Ret	16	14	14	47
14	(Italy) Marco Frezza	11	6	12	24	Ret	8	8	7	10	9	Ret	21	6	18	Ret	12	8	34
15	(Brazil) Carlos Iaconelli	2	10	Ret	9														30
16	(Spain) Dani Clos	16	14	7	16	8	7	Ret	21	31			9	17	9		15	Ret	28
17	(Spain) Oliver Campos-Hull	Ret	Ret	15	Ret	27	15	19	23	20	11	10	10	7	Ret	3	5	6	27
18	(Colombia) Federico Montoya	Ret	12	18	12	Ret	Ret	4	12	13			12	Ret	13	7	11	Ret	16
19	(Italy) Marcello Puglisi	7	7	Ret	32	13	Ret	16	24	26									16
20	(Italy) Simona de Silvestro	9	20	Ret	Ret	19	17	14	5	9	14	Ret	17	9	Ret	Ret	16	11	16
21	(Finland) Mika Leirilaakso	24	8	10	20	18	Ret	Ret	29	16	12	9							12
22	(Italy) Nicola Gianniberti															6			10
23	(Italy) Alex Frassineti	23	13	24	13	21	20	13	37	Ret	17	16	23	8	11	8	7		9
24	(Italy) Manuele Gatto	13	Ret	16	Ret	29	14	15	8	8									9
25	(Italy) Matteo Chinosi	27	15	26	18	30	26	5	17	11	20	14	Ret	22	22	Ret	25	Ret	6
26	(Italy) Valentino Sebastiani	20	25	30	33	22	22	Ret	36	Ret	10	13	20	10	12	10	Ret	12	4
27	(Austria) Walter Grubmüller	10	21	19	23	15	16	Ret	10	Ret			25	21	23	15	13	15	3
28	(Italy) Stefano Turchetto	19	24	13	34	20	Ret	Ret	9	27	22	19	16	Ret	19	14	20	24	2
29	(Italy) Filippo Ponti	12	11	28	17	16	18	Ret	Ret	Ret							24	21	0
30	(Italy) Cristian Corsini	17	Ret	Ret	19	14	21	Ret	11	15	16	Ret					26	16	0
31	(United Kingdom) Alexander Russell	21	27	20	27	23	25	Ret	15	28	19	15	15	11	21	17	18	18	0
32	(Italy) Niki Sebastiani	14	23	22	22	24	Ret	Ret	13	12	13	18	18	15	15	Ret	27	Ret	0
33	(Italy) Alberto Costa	15	18	21	15	17	19	20	25	22	15	12	19	13	16	13	17	22	0
34	(Italy) Marco Mocci												14	12	14				0
35	(Italy) Paolo Meloni	18	22	23	28	25	24	18	28	19	18	17	13	14	17		19	25	0
36	(Italy) Marco Mapelli																23	13	0
37	(Italy) Giandomenico Sposito	Ret	Ret	17	26			21	30	14									0
38	(Switzerland) Jonathan Hirschi							23	14	17									0
39	(Italy) Ercole Mores							25	16	24									0
40	(Italy) Moreno Bruzzone			31	29	26	23	17	31	18									0
41	(Italy) Niccolò Valentini												21	18	20	Ret	29	20	0
42	(Italy) Daniele Rosano							22	18	23									0
43	(Italy) Laura Polidori			DNS	31			Ret	19	25									0
44	(Italy) Nicholas Risitano	28	26	Ret	25			Ret	34	21									0
45	(Italy) Nicolo Pastore																22	23	0
	(Italy) Davide Giampapa	Ret	Ret																
	(Belgium) Michael Herck	DNQ	DNQ																
	(Italy) Enea Casoni			DNQ	DNQ														

== 2005 Formula Renault 2.0 Italia Winter Series ==
Twos meetings, each with two races were held at Adria International Raceway.

Winter Series points were awarded as follows:

Position	1st	2nd	3rd	4th	5th	6th	7th	8th	9th	10th
Points	20	15	12	10	8	6	4	6	4	2

Pos	Driver	Team	(Italy) ADR Nov 20		(Italy) ADR Nov 26		Points
Pos	Driver	Team	1	2	3	4	Points
1	(Finland) Atte Mustonen	Korainen bros. Motorsport	1	3	3	Ret	44
2	(Belgium) Jonathan Thonon	CO2 Motorsport	2	1	7	7	43
3	(Belgium) Jérôme d'Ambrosio	Euronova Racing	Ret	Ret	1*	1	40
4	(Spain) Oliver Campos-Hull	Twin Cam Motorsport	3	2	6	6	39
5	(Italy) Marco Frezza	Jenzer Motorsport	6	8	2	8	27
6	(Venezuela) Johnny Cecotto Jr.	Kiwi	8	12	Ret	2	26
7	(Italy) Valentino Sebastiani	IT Loox Racing	5	5	4	Ret	18
8	(Italy) Niki Sebastiani	IT Loox Racing	4	7	18	Ret	14
9	(Romania) Mihai Marinescu	AP Motorsport	7	6	8	Ret	13
10	(Italy) Pasquale Di Sabatino	Tomcat Racing	11	24	19	3	12
11	(Austria) Walter Grubmüller	Jenzer Motorsport	Ret	4	12	9	12
12	(Mexico) Pablo Sánchez López	Alan Racing	10	10	Ret	4	12
13	(Italy) Stefano Turchetto	Toby Racing	16	14	5	Ret	8
14	(Italy) Mirko Bortolotti	Auinger	14	15	13	5	8
15	(Italy) Federico Muggia	BVM Minardi	9	9	9	Ret	6
16	(Finland) Joonas Mannerjärvi	MDR Motorsport	15	11	10	13	1
17	(Italy) Edoardo Mortara	Prema Powerteam			Ret	10	0
18	(Italy) Andrea Caldarelli	RP Motorsport	13	16	11	11	0
19	(Italy) Nicolò Pastore	CO2 Motorsport	12	19	16	Ret	0
20	(United Kingdom) Oliver Oakes	Euronova Racing	20	20	20	12	0
21	(Italy) Alberto Costa	Euronova Racing	18	13			0
22	(Italy) Marco Visconti	Toby Racing	22	21	14	14	0
23	(Finland) Mikael Forsten	RP Motorsport	19	22	15	16	0
24	(Netherlands) Danny Bleek	RP Motorsport			Ret	15	0
25	(Italy) Niccolò Valentini	Team Durango	17	18	17	Ret	0
26	German	Twin Cam Motorsport	Ret	17			0
27	(Italy) Pietro Gandolfi	AP Motorsport	21	23	21	Ret	0
