= 2011 Challenge Formula Renault 2.0 =

2011 Challenge Formula Renault 2.0 was the twelfth season of the Italian Formula Renault Championship, but the first under the name "Challenge Formula Renault 2.0". Most races were in Italy with one race at the Red Bull Ring in Austria. Andrea Boffo won the competition, taking home three wins. Although Christian Mancinelli won five races, inconsistent results saw him finish third. Team Torino Motorsport won the team championship.

== Regulations ==
Each championship round included 2 races by rounds length of 30 minutes each. Points were awarded as follows:

Position	1st	2nd	3rd	4th	5th	6th	7th	8th	9th	10th	11th	12th	13th	14th	15th
Points	32	28	24	22	20	18	16	14	12	10	8	6	4	2	1

In each race, 2 additional points were awarded for fastest lap. In race 1, 2 additional points were added for pole position.

== Results ==
Pos	Driver	Team	(Italy) MNZ March 26–27		(Italy) IMO May 7–8		(Italy) MUG May 28–29		(Austria) RBR June 11–12		(Italy) MIS July 23–24		(Italy) ADR September 24–25		Points
Pos	Driver	Team	1	2	3	4	5	6	7	8	9	10	11	12	Points
1	(Italy) Andrea Boffo	Team Torino Motorsport	7	1	4	3	4	4	1	5	2	1	4	5	302
2	(Italy) Omar Mambretti	Team Torino Motorsport	2	11	2	2	5	1	4	7	5	2	3	4	276
3	(Italy) Christian Mancinelli	GSK Motorsport	1	Ret	6	1	1	17	5	2	1	13	1	2	266
4	(Italy) Tommaso Menchini	GSK Motorsport	6	4	3	4	3	3	2	4	Ret	Ret	2	7	228
5	(Italy) Nicola De Val	Viola Formula Racing	3	3	22	5	7	13	3	1	4	6	7	6	224
6	(Italy) Stefano De Val	Viola Formula Racing	4	12	5	7	Ret	9	8	6	6	Ret	5	1	184
7	(Italy) Simone Taloni	Winner Motorsport			8	10	6	2	9	Ret	9	5	8	9	140
8	(Italy) Alberto Agresta	MG Motorsport			7	9	2	Ret			Ret	7	6	3	114
9	(Mexico) Luis Michael Dörrbecker	Team Costa Rica / Facondini Racing	8	13	15	Ret	11	6	6	3	Ret	12	10	Ret	103
10	(Italy) Patrick Gobbo	Team Torino Motorsport	5	2	9	11	8	7							98
11	(Italy) Claudio Maria Castiglioni	CO2 Motorsport	Ret	7	Ret	13	9	5			7	8	9	14	96
12	(Italy) Emanuele Piva	Viola Formula Racing			13	6	10	10			10	4	15	10	85
13	(Italy) Matteo Ciccaglioni	SG Motors	9	14	1	15	Ret	8			Ret	16			61
14	(Italy) Luca Defendi	GSK Motorsport							7	8	14	11	Ret	8	54
15	(Italy) Andrea Baiguera	CO2 Motorsport	11	10	21	16	13	11			11	Ret	13	Ret	42
16	(Italy) Angelo Mezzatesta	Facondini Racing	12	8	11	Ret	12	12							40
17	(Venezuela) Valeria Vanessa Carballo Berroteran	Team Costa Rica / Facondini Racing	13	9	Ret	18	16	DNS	Ret	Ret	8	Ret	Ret	11	38
17	(Italy) Pierluigi Veronesi	CO2 Motorsport	Ret	5	14	12	Ret	15							31
19	(Italy) Luca Mingotti	AP Motorsport			10	8					15	14			29
20	(Costa Rica) James Adams	Team Costa Rica / Facondini Racing	10	6											28
21	(Italy) Stefano Turchetto	TS Corse									3	15			27
22	(Italy) Kevin Gilardoni	Team Torino Motorsport									Ret	3			24
23	(Italy) Pietro Peccenini	TS Corse									12	9			18
24	(Canada) David Richert	Team Torino Motorsport			16	20					13	10			14
25	(Italy) Matteo Pollini	CO2 Motorsport											11	12	14
26	(Italy) Gabriele Larini	Team Torino Motorsport					15	Ret					12	13	11
27	(Mexico) Juan Carlos Sistos	Team Costa Rica / Facondini Racing			12	14	17	16							8
28	(Italy) Laura Polidori	LP Motorsport					14	14							4
29	(Panama) Gianni Alessandria	Team Costa Rica / Facondini Racing											14	15	3
–	(France) Hervé Clement	GTRO			17	19									0
–	(Italy) Emanuele Mari	GSK Motorsport			Ret	17									0
–	(France) Michel Mora	GTRO			18	21									0
–	(France) Christian Ruiz	GTRO			19	23									0
–	(France) Gilles Charpentier	GTRO			20	22									0

Pos	Team	Points
1	(Italy) Team Torino Motorsport	590
2	(Italy) GSK Motorsport	464
3	(Italy) Viola Formula Racing	408
4	Team Costa Rica / Facondini Racing	195
5	(Italy) CO2 Motorsport	149
6	(Italy) Winner Motorsport	140
7	(Italy) MG Motorsport	114
8	(Italy) TS Corse	45
9	(Italy) AP Motorsport	29
10	(Italy) Facondini Racing	28
