= Marco Mocci =

Italian racing driver (born 1982)

- Nationality: (Italy) Italian
- Born: 19 October 1982 (age 44) Civitavecchia, Rome, Italy

Marco Mocci (born 19 October 1982) is an Italian racing driver. He has competed in Euroseries 3000 and International Formula Master.
