= Autodromo Riccardo Paletti =

Hard surface motor racing circuit in Italy

- Full Circuit (2002–2009)
- Location: Varano de' Melegari, Italy
- Coordinates: 44°40′52″N 10°1′21″E
- FIA Grade: 3
- Opened: 1969
- Former names: Autodromo di Varano (1969–1983)
- Major events: Former: Italian Formula Renault Championship (2000–2006, 2009, 2011); Formula Abarth Italian Championship (2005–2011); Italian F3 (1972–1973, 1975–2010); Italian GT (1993–1997, 1999–2001)
- Website: https://www.autodromovarano.it/

Full Circuit (2011–present)
- Surface: Asphalt
- Length: 2.350 km (1.460 mi)
- Turns: 14
- Race lap record: 1:04.432 ( (Switzerland) Patric Niederhauser, Tatuus FA010, 2011, Formula Abarth)

Short Circuit (2011–present)
- Surface: Asphalt
- Length: 1.640 km (1.019 mi)
- Turns: 13

Full Circuit (2010)
- Surface: Asphalt
- Length: 2.360 km (1.466 mi)
- Turns: 12
- Race lap record: 1:03.181 ( (Brazil) César Ramos, Dallara F310, 2010, F3)

Full Circuit (2002–2009)
- Surface: Asphalt
- Length: 2.375 km (1.476 mi)
- Turns: 14
- Race lap record: 1:03.479 ( (Italy) Mauro Massironi, Dallara F302, 2006, F3)

Full Circuit (1997–2001)
- Surface: Asphalt
- Length: 1.800 km (1.118 mi)
- Turns: 11
- Race lap record: 0:46.729 ( (Italy) Mirko Venturi, Tatuus FR2000, 2001, FR 2.0)

Full Circuit (1972–1996)
- Surface: Asphalt
- Length: 1.800 km (1.118 mi)
- Turns: 9
- Race lap record: 0:44.905 ( (Italy) Luca Badoer, Dallara F391, 1991, F3)

Full Circuit (1971)
- Surface: Asphalt
- Length: 1.200 km (0.746 mi)
- Turns: 9

Original Circuit (1969–1970)
- Surface: Asphalt
- Length: 0.600 km (0.373 mi)
- Turns: 5

Autodromo Riccardo Paletti is a race track for motorsports near Varano in the Province of Parma, Italy, about 30 km (19 mi) southwest of Parma. The track began as a small 0.550 km (0.342 mi) oval in 1969, and this was then expanded to a full 1.800 km (1.118 mi), 11-turn race track. This new layout was inaugurated officially on 26 March 1972. The track is named after Formula One driver Riccardo Paletti (1958–1982), who was killed at the 1982 Canadian Grand Prix.

In 2001 the layout was extended to a length of 2.375 km (1.476 mi). However, the layout length was decreased to 2.360 km (1.466 mi) in 2010, then 2.350 km (1.460 mi) in 2011.

Among the track's co-founders was engineer Giampaolo Dallara, who later established Dallara in Varano.

== Lap records ==
As of September 2011, the fastest official race lap records at the Autodromo Riccardo Paletti are listed as:

Category	Time	Driver	Vehicle	Event
Full Circuit (2011–present): 2.350 km (1.460 mi)
Formula Abarth	1:04.432	Patric Niederhauser	Tatuus FA010	2011 Varano Formula Abarth round
Formula Renault 2.0	1:06.321	Andrea Boffo (Note: Both drivers took the same lap time independently.); Stefano de Val	Barazi-Epsilon FR2.0-10	2011 Varano Challenge Formula Renault 2.0 round
Full Circuit (2010): 2.360 km (1.466 mi)
Formula Three	1:03.181	César Ramos	Dallara F310	2010 Varano Italian F3 round
Formula Abarth	1:04.883	Patric Niederhauser	Tatuus FA010	2010 Varano Formula Abarth round
Full Circuit (2002–2009): 2.375 km (1.476 mi)
Formula Three	1:03.479	Mauro Massironi	Dallara F302	2006 Varano Italian F3 round
Formula Renault 2.0	1:04.996	Federico Muggia	Tatuus FR2000	2005 Varano Formula Renault 2.0 Italia round
Formula Abarth	1:08.055	Davide Rigon	Gloria B5-10Y	2005 Varano Formula Azzurra round
Full Circuit (1997–2001): 1.800 km (1.118 mi)
Formula Renault 2.0	0:46.729	Mirko Venturi	Tatuus FR2000	2001 Varano Formula Renault 2000 Italia round
Formula Three	0:47.857	Giampaolo Ermolli	Dallara F301	2001 Varano Italian F3 round
Super Touring	0:48.364	Emanuele Naspetti	BMW 320i	1998 Varano Italian Superturismo round
GT2	0:50.744	Massimo Pasini	Porsche 911 Turbo GT2	1999 Varano Italian GT round
Full Circuit (1972–1996): 1.800 km (1.118 mi)
Formula Three	0:44.905	Luca Badoer	Dallara F391	1991 Varano Italian F3 round
Group 6	0:47.980	Arcadio Pezzali	Osella PA8	1981 Varano Italian Group 6 round
Group A	0:49.013	Roberto Ravaglia	BMW M3 Sport Evolution	1992 Varano Italian Superturismo round
Super Touring	0:49.497	Emanuele Pirro	Audi A4 Quattro	1995 Varano Italian Superturismo round
GT1	0:49.570	Giuseppe Schenetti	Porsche 964 Turbo S	1993 Varano Italian GT round
Porsche Carrera Cup	0:51.439	Bruno Corradi	Porsche 993 Supercup	1995 Varano Italian GT round
Group 5	0:52.350	"Victor"	Porsche 935	1981 Varano Italian Group 5 round
Group 4	0:55.200	"Tambauto"	Porsche 911 Carrera RSR	1974 Trofeo Comune Varano
Full Circuit (1971): 1.200 km (0.746 mi)
Original Circuit (1969–1970): 0.600 km (0.373 mi)
