= January 19 =

January 19 this year in various calendars
- Monday, 19 January 2026
Akan	Nkyidwo
Armenian	3 Mehekani 1475
Aztec	Toxcatl 9, 10 Ōlīn
Babylonian	29 Kislimu, 2336 SE
Balinese pawukon	Luang, Pepet, Kajeng, Sri, Umanis, Urukung, Coma of Medangkungan, Ludra, Erangan, Raksasa
Bengali	5 Magh, BS 1432
Chinese	Yin Water Snake・Roof Mansion; Wood Snake Year, Month 12, Day 1 (Xiaohan, 1 day until Dahan)
Common Era	19 January 2026 CE
Coptic	11 Tobi, AM 1742
Egyptian	8 Payni, 2774 NE
Ethiopian	11 Ṭer, 2018 Amätä Məhrät
French Republican	Décade III, Décadi de Nivôse de l'Année 234 de la République
Gregorian	19 January, AD 2026
Hebrew	1 Shevat, AM 5786
Hindu	Uttarāṣāḍha・Vajra; Solar: 6 Māgha, 1947 SE; Lunisolar: Pratipada, Śukla pakṣa of Māgha, 2082 VE; Siddhārthin・5126 KY・1,872,594
Icelandic	Mánudagur, 27 Mörsugur 2025
Islamic	30 Rajab, AH 1447 (using tabular method)
ISO week date	2026-W04-1
Japanese	1 Shiwasu, Reiwa 8 (Shōkan, 1 day until Daikan)
Julian	6 January, AD 2026 (AM 7534)
Julian day	2461060
Korean	1 Sodal, 4358 DE
Maya	13.0.13.4.17; 15 Muan, 10 Caban
Roman	ante diem VIII Idus Ianuarias, MMDCCLXXIX AUC
Solar Hijri	29 Dey, SH 1404
Tibetan	1 rgyal, shing mo sbrul 2152 or 1771 or 999

<<	January					>>
Su	Mo	Tu	We	Th	Fr	Sa
				1	2	3
4	5	6	7	8	9	10
11	12	13	14	15	16	17
18	19	20	21	22	23	24
25	26	27	28	29	30	31
2026

January 19 in recent years
2026 (Monday)
2025 (Sunday)
2024 (Friday)
2023 (Thursday)
2022 (Wednesday)
2021 (Tuesday)
2020 (Sunday)
2019 (Saturday)
2018 (Friday)
2017 (Thursday)

January 19 is the 19th day of the year in the Gregorian calendar; 346 days remain until the end of the year (347 in leap years).

== Events ==
=== Pre-1600 ===
- 379 – Emperor Gratian elevates Flavius Theodosius at Sirmium to Augustus, and gives him authority over all the eastern provinces of the Roman Empire.
- 649 – Conquest of Kucha: The forces of Kucha surrender after a forty-day siege led by Tang dynasty general Ashina She'er, establishing Tang control over the northern Tarim Basin in Xinjiang.
- 1419 – Hundred Years' War: Rouen surrenders to Henry V of England, completing his reconquest of Normandy.
- 1421 – John VIII Palaiologos marries Sophia of Montferrat and is then crowned Byzantine co-emperor to his father Manuel II Palaiologos.
- 1511 – The Italian Duchy of Mirandola surrenders to the Pope.
- 1520 – Sten Sture the Younger, the Regent of Sweden, is mortally wounded at the Battle of Bogesund and dies on February 3.

=== 1601–1900 ===
- 1607 – San Agustin Church in Manila is officially completed; it is the oldest church still standing in the Philippines.
- 1639 – Hämeenlinna (Swedish: Tavastehus) is granted privileges after it separated from the Vanaja parish as its own city in Tavastia.
- 1764 – John Wilkes is expelled from the British House of Commons for seditious libel.
- 1764 – Bolle Willum Luxdorph records in his diary that a mail bomb, possibly the world's first, has severely injured the Danish Colonel Poulsen, residing at Børglum Abbey.
- 1788 – The second group of ships of the First Fleet arrive at Botany Bay.
- 1795 – The Batavian Republic is proclaimed in the Netherlands, replacing the Dutch Republic.
- 1817 – An army of 5,423 soldiers, led by General José de San Martín, crosses the Andes from Argentina to liberate Chile and then Peru.
- 1829 – Johann Wolfgang von Goethe's Faust: The First Part of the Tragedy receives its premiere performance.
- 1839 – The British East India Company captures Aden.
- 1853 – Giuseppe Verdi's opera Il trovatore receives its premiere performance in Rome.
- 1861 – American Civil War: Georgia joins South Carolina, Florida, Mississippi, and Alabama in declaring secession from the United States.
- 1862 – American Civil War: Battle of Mill Springs: The Confederacy suffers its first significant defeat in the conflict.
- 1871 – Franco-Prussian War: In the Siege of Paris, Prussia wins the Battle of St. Quentin. Meanwhile, the French attempt to break the siege in the Battle of Buzenval will end unsuccessfully the following day.
- 1883 – The first electric lighting system employing overhead wires, built by Thomas Edison, begins service at Roselle, New Jersey.
- 1899 – Anglo-Egyptian Sudan is formed.

=== 1901–present ===
- 1901 – Queen Victoria, Queen of the United Kingdom, is stricken with paralysis. She dies three days later at the age of 81.
- 1915 – Georges Claude patents the neon discharge tube for use in advertising.
- 1915 – German strategic bombing during World War I: German zeppelins bomb the towns of Great Yarmouth and King's Lynn in the United Kingdom killing at least 20 people, in the first major aerial bombardment of a civilian target.
- 1917 – Silvertown explosion: A blast at a munitions factory in London kills 73 and injures over 400. The resulting fire causes over £2,000,000 worth of damage.
- 1920 – The United States Senate votes against joining the League of Nations.
- 1920 – The American Civil Liberties Union (ACLU) is founded.
- 1937 – Howard Hughes sets a new air record by flying from Los Angeles to New York City in seven hours, 28 minutes, 25 seconds.
- 1941 – World War II: HMS Greyhound and other escorts of convoy AS-12 sink Italian submarine Neghelli with all hands 64 kilometres (40 mi) northeast of Falkonera.
- 1942 – World War II: The Japanese conquest of Burma begins.
- 1945 – World War II: Soviet forces liberate the Łódź Ghetto. Of more than 200,000 inhabitants in 1940, fewer than 900 had survived the Nazi occupation.
- 1946 – General Douglas MacArthur establishes the International Military Tribunal for the Far East in Tokyo to try Japanese war criminals.
- 1953 – Almost 72 percent of all television sets in the United States are tuned into I Love Lucy to watch Lucy give birth.
- 1960 – Japan and the United States sign the US–Japan Mutual Security Treaty
- 1960 – Scandinavian Airlines System Flight 871 crashes near Ankara Esenboğa Airport in Turkey, killing all 42 aboard.
- 1966 – Indira Gandhi becomes India's first female prime minister.
- 1969 – Student Jan Palach dies after setting himself on fire three days earlier in Prague's Wenceslas Square to protest about the invasion of Czechoslovakia by the Soviet Union in 1968. His funeral turns into another major protest.
- 1977 – President Gerald Ford pardons Iva Toguri D'Aquino (a.k.a. "Tokyo Rose").
- 1978 – The last Volkswagen Beetle made in Germany leaves VW's plant in Emden. Beetle production in Latin America continues until 2003.
- 1981 – Iran hostage crisis: United States and Iranian officials sign an agreement to release 52 American hostages after 14 months of captivity.
- 1988 – Trans-Colorado Airlines Flight 2286 crashes in Bayfield, Colorado, killing nine.
- 1990 – Exodus of Kashmiri Pandits from the Kashmir Valley in Indian-administered Kashmir due to an insurgency.
- 1991 – Gulf War: Iraq fires a second Scud missile into Israel, causing 15 injuries.
- 1993 – Czech Republic and Slovakia join the United Nations.
- 1995 – After being struck by lightning the crew of Bristow Helicopters Flight 56C are forced to ditch. All 18 aboard are later rescued.
- 1996 – The barge North Cape oil spill occurs as an engine fire forces the tugboat Scandia ashore on Moonstone Beach in South Kingstown, Rhode Island.
- 1997 – Yasser Arafat returns to Hebron after more than 30 years and joins celebrations over the handover of the last Israeli-controlled West Bank city.
- 1999 – British Aerospace agrees to acquire the defence subsidiary of the General Electric Company, forming BAE Systems in November 1999.
- 2006 – A Slovak Air Force Antonov An-24 crashes near Hejce, Hungary, killing 42.
- 2007 – Turkish-Armenian journalist Hrant Dink is assassinated in front of his newspaper's Istanbul office by 17-year-old Turkish ultra-nationalist Ogün Samast.
- 2007 – Four-man Team N2i, using only skis and kites, completes a 1,093-mile (1,759 km) trek to reach the Antarctic pole of inaccessibility for the first time since 1965 and for the first time ever without mechanical assistance.
- 2012 – The Hong Kong-based file-sharing website Megaupload is shut down by the FBI.
- 2014 – A bomb attack on an army convoy in the city of Bannu kills at least 26 Pakistani soldiers and injures 38 others.
- 2024 – The Japan Aerospace Exploration Agency's probe lands on the moon, making Japan the 5th country to land a spacecraft on the moon.
- 2025 – Bytedance and sister companies are banned from the United States for "security concerns".

== Births ==
=== Pre-1600 ===
- 399 – Pulcheria, Byzantine empress and saint (died 453)
- 1200 – Dōgen Zenji, founder of Sōtō Zen (died 1253)
- 1544 – Francis II of France (died 1560)

=== 1601–1900 ===
- 1617 – Lucas Faydherbe, Flemish sculptor and architect (died 1697)
- 1628 – Charles Stanley, 8th Earl of Derby, English noble (died 1672)
- 1676 – John Weldon, English organist and composer (died 1736)
- 1721 – Jean-Philippe Baratier, German scholar and author (died 1740)
- 1736 – James Watt, Scottish chemist and engineer (died 1819)
- 1737 – Giuseppe Millico, Italian soprano, composer, and educator (died 1802)
- 1739 – Joseph Bonomi the Elder, Italian architect, designed Longford Hall and Barrells Hall (died 1808)
- 1752 – James Morris III, American captain (died 1820)
- 1757 – Countess Augusta Reuss of Ebersdorf (died 1831)
- 1788 – Pavel Kiselyov, Russian general and politician (died 1874)
- 1790 – Per Daniel Amadeus Atterbom, Swedish poet and academic (died 1855)
- 1798 – Auguste Comte, French economist, sociologist, and philosopher (died 1857)
- 1803 – Sarah Helen Whitman, American poet, essayist, and romantic interest of Edgar Allan Poe (died 1878)
- 1807 – Robert E. Lee, American Confederate general (died 1870)
- 1808 – Lysander Spooner, American philosopher and author (died 1887)
- 1809 – Edgar Allan Poe, American short story writer, poet, and critic (died 1849)
- 1810 – Talhaiarn, Welsh poet and architect (died 1869)
- 1813 – Henry Bessemer, English engineer and businessman (died 1898)
- 1832 – Ferdinand Laub, Czech violinist and composer (died 1875)
- 1833 – Alfred Clebsch, German mathematician and academic (died 1872)
- 1839 – Paul Cézanne, French painter (died 1906)
- 1840 – Dethloff Willrodt, American Civil War veteran and politician (died 1932)
- 1848 – Arturo Graf, Italian poet, of German ancestry (died 1913)
- 1848 – John Fitzwilliam Stairs, Canadian businessman and politician (died 1904)
- 1848 – Matthew Webb, English swimmer and diver (died 1883)
- 1851 – Jacobus Kapteyn, Dutch astronomer and academic (died 1922)
- 1852 – Thomas Price, Welsh-Australian politician, 24th Premier of South Australia (died 1909)
- 1863 – Werner Sombart, German economist and sociologist (died 1941)
- 1866 – Harry Davenport, American stage and film actor (died 1949)
- 1871 – Dame Gruev, Bulgarian educator and activist, co-founded the Internal Macedonian Revolutionary Organization (died 1906)
- 1874 – Hitachiyama Taniemon, Japanese sumo wrestler, the 19th Yokozuna (died 1922)
- 1876 – Wakashima Gonshirō, Japanese sumo wrestler, the 21st Yokozuna (died 1943)
- 1876 – Dragotin Kette, Slovenian poet and author (died 1899)
- 1878 – Herbert Chapman, English footballer and manager (died 1934)
- 1879 – Boris Savinkov, Russian soldier and author (died 1925)
- 1882 – John Cain Sr., Australian politician, 34th Premier of Victoria (died 1957)
- 1883 – Hermann Abendroth, German conductor (died 1956)
- 1887 – Alexander Woollcott, American actor, playwright, and critic (died 1943)
- 1888 – Chick Gandil, American baseball player (died 1970)
- 1889 – Sophie Taeuber-Arp, Swiss painter and sculptor (died 1943)
- 1892 – Ólafur Thors, Icelandic lawyer and politician, Prime Minister of Iceland (died 1964)
- 1893 – Magda Tagliaferro, Brazilian pianist and educator (died 1986)

=== 1901–present ===
- 1901 – Dunc Munro, Scottish-Canadian ice hockey player and coach (died 1958)
- 1903 – Boris Blacher, German composer and playwright (died 1975)
- 1903 – Dyre Vaa, Norwegian sculptor and painter (died 1980)
- 1905 – Stanley Hawes, English-Australian director and producer (died 1991)
- 1908 – Ish Kabibble, American comedian and cornet player (died 1994)
- 1908 – Aleksandr Gennadievich Kurosh, Russian mathematician and theorist (died 1971)
- 1911 – Choor Singh, Indian-Singaporean lawyer and judge (died 2009)
- 1911 – Busher Jackson, Canadian ice hockey player (died 1966)
- 1912 – Leonid Kantorovich, Russian mathematician and economist, Nobel Prize laureate (died 1986)
- 1913 – Rex Ingamells, Australian author and poet (died 1955)
- 1913 – Rudolf Wanderone, American professional pocket billiards player (died 1996)
- 1918 – John H. Johnson, American publisher, founded the Johnson Publishing Company (died 2005)
- 1920 – Bernard Dunstan, English painter and educator (died 2017)
- 1920 – Javier Pérez de Cuéllar, Peruvian politician and diplomat, 135th Prime Minister of Peru (died 2020)
- 1921 – Patricia Highsmith, American novelist and short story writer (died 1995)
- 1922 – Guy Madison, American actor (died 1996)
- 1922 – Arthur Morris, Australian cricketer and journalist (died 2015)
- 1922 – Miguel Muñoz, Spanish footballer and manager (died 1990)
- 1923 – Dagmar Loe, Norwegian journalist (died 2024)
- 1923 – Bob McFadden, American singer, impressionist, and voice-over actor (died 2000)
- 1923 – Jean Stapleton, American actress and singer (died 2013)
- 1924 – Nicholas Colasanto, American actor and director (died 1985)
- 1924 – Jean-François Revel, French philosopher (died 2006)
- 1925 – Nina Bawden, English author (died 2012)
- 1926 – Hans Massaquoi, German-American journalist and author (died 2013)
- 1926 – Fritz Weaver, American actor (died 2016)
- 1930 – Tippi Hedren, American model, actress, and animal rights-welfare activist
- 1930 – John Waite, South African cricketer (died 2011)
- 1931 – Robert MacNeil, Canadian-American journalist and author (died 2024)
- 1932 – Russ Hamilton, English singer-songwriter (died 2008)
- 1932 – Richard Lester, American-English director, producer, and screenwriter
- 1932 – Harry Lonsdale, American chemist, businessman, and politician (died 2014)
- 1933 – George Coyne, American priest, astronomer, and theologian (died 2020)
- 1934 – John Richardson, English actor (died 2021)
- 1935 – Johnny O'Keefe, Australian singer-songwriter (died 1978)
- 1936 – Fred J. Lincoln, American actor, director, producer, and screenwriter (died 2013)
- 1936 – Ziaur Rahman, Bangladeshi general and politician, seventh President of Bangladesh (died 1981)
- 1936 – Willie "Big Eyes" Smith, American singer, harmonica player, and drummer (died 2011)
- 1937 – Princess Birgitta of Sweden (died 2024)
- 1937 – John Lions, Australian computer scientist and academic (died 1998)
- 1939 – Phil Everly, American singer-songwriter and guitarist (died 2014)
- 1940 – Paolo Borsellino, Italian lawyer and judge (died 1992)
- 1940 – Denise Narcisse-Mair, Canadian musician (died 2010)
- 1941 – Tony Anholt, British actor (died 2002)
- 1941 – Colin Gunton, English theologian and academic (died 2003)
- 1941 – Pat Patterson, Canadian wrestler, trainer, and referee (died 2020)
- 1942 – Michael Crawford, English actor and singer
- 1943 – Larry Clark, American director, producer, and screenwriter
- 1943 – Janis Joplin, American singer-songwriter (died 1970)
- 1943 – Princess Margriet of the Netherlands
- 1944 – Shelley Fabares, American actress and singer (died 2026)
- 1944 – Thom Mayne, American architect and academic, designed the San Francisco Federal Building and Phare Tower
- 1944 – Dan Reeves, American football player and coach (died 2022)
- 1945 – Trevor Williams, English singer-songwriter and bass player
- 1946 – Julian Barnes, English novelist, short story writer, essayist, and critic
- 1946 – Dolly Parton, American singer-songwriter and actress (died 2026)
- 1947 – Frank Aarebrot, Norwegian political scientist and academic (died 2017)
- 1947 – Paula Deen, American chef and author
- 1947 – Rod Evans, English singer-songwriter
- 1948 – Nancy Lynch, American computer scientist and academic
- 1948 – Frank McKenna, Canadian politician and diplomat, 27th Premier of New Brunswick
- 1948 – Mal Reilly, English rugby league player and coach
- 1949 – Arend Langenberg, Dutch voice actor and radio host (died 2012)
- 1949 – Robert Palmer, English singer-songwriter and guitarist (died 2003)
- 1950 – Sébastien Dhavernas, Canadian actor
- 1950 – Jon Matlack, American baseball player
- 1951 – Martha Davis, American singer
- 1952 – Dewey Bunnell, English-American singer-songwriter and guitarist
- 1952 – Nadiuska, German television actress
- 1952 – Bruce Jay Nelson, American computer scientist (died 1999)
- 1953 – Desi Arnaz Jr., American actor and singer
- 1953 – Richard Legendre, Canadian tennis player and politician
- 1953 – Wayne Schimmelbusch, Australian footballer and coach
- 1954 – Katey Sagal, American actress and singer
- 1954 – Cindy Sherman, American photographer and director
- 1954 – Esther Shkalim, Israeli poet and Mizrahi feminist
- 1955 – Simon Rattle, English-German orchestral conductor
- 1956 – Carman, American singer-songwriter, actor, and television host (died 2021)
- 1956 – Susan Solomon, American atmospheric chemist
- 1957 – Ottis Anderson, American football player and sportscaster
- 1957 – Roger Ashton-Griffiths, English actor, screenwriter and film director
- 1957 – Kenneth McClintock, Puerto Rican public servant and politician, 22nd Secretary of State of Puerto Rico
- 1958 – Thomas Kinkade, American painter (died 2012)
- 1958 – Altemio Sanchez, Puerto Rican serial killer and rapist (died 2023)
- 1959 – Danese Cooper, American computer scientist and programmer
- 1959 – Jeff Pilson, American bass player, songwriter, and actor
- 1961 – Paul McCrane, American actor, director, and singer
- 1961 – Wayne Hemingway, English fashion designer, co-founded Red or Dead
- 1961 – William Ragsdale, American actor
- 1962 – Hans Daams, Dutch cyclist
- 1962 – Chris Sabo, American baseball player and coach
- 1962 – Jeff Van Gundy, American basketball player and coach
- 1963 – Michael Adams, American basketball player and coach
- 1963 – Martin Bashir, English journalist
- 1963 – John Bercow, English politician, Speaker of the House of Commons
- 1964 – Janine Antoni, Bahamian sculptor and photographer
- 1964 – Ricardo Arjona, Guatemalan singer-songwriter and basketball player
- 1966 – Sylvain Côté, Canadian ice hockey player
- 1966 – Stefan Edberg, Swedish tennis player and coach
- 1966 – Lena Philipsson, Swedish singer-songwriter
- 1968 – David Bartlett, Australian politician, 43rd Premier of Tasmania
- 1968 – Whitfield Crane, American singer-songwriter
- 1968 – Matt Hill, Canadian voice actor
- 1969 – Edwidge Danticat, Haitian-American novelist and short story writer
- 1969 – Luc Longley, Australian basketball player and coach
- 1969 – Trey Lorenz, American singer-songwriter and producer
- 1969 – Predrag Mijatović, Montenegrin footballer and manager
- 1969 – Junior Seau, American football player (died 2012)
- 1969 – Steve Staunton, Irish footballer and manager
- 1970 – Steffen Freund, German footballer and manager
- 1970 – Kathleen Smet, Belgian triathlete
- 1970 – Udo Suzuki, Japanese comedian and singer
- 1971 – Eric Mangini, American football coach
- 1971 – Shawn Wayans, American actor, producer, and screenwriter
- 1971 – John Wozniak, American singer-songwriter and guitarist
- 1971 – Phil Nevin, American baseball player and coach
- 1972 – Drea de Matteo, American actress
- 1972 – Yoon Hae-young, South Korean actress
- 1972 – Sergei Zjukin, Estonian chess player and coach
- 1973 – Antero Manninen, Finnish cellist
- 1973 – Yevgeny Sadovyi, Russian swimmer and coach
- 1974 – Dainius Adomaitis, Lithuanian basketball player and coach
- 1974 – Frank Caliendo, American comedian, actor, and screenwriter
- 1974 – Walter Jones, American football player
- 1974 – Ian Laperrière, Canadian-American ice hockey player and coach
- 1974 – Jaime Moreno, Bolivian footballer and manager
- 1975 – Natalie Cook, Australian volleyball player
- 1975 – Zdeňka Málková, Czech tennis player
- 1976 – Natale Gonnella, Italian footballer
- 1976 – Tarso Marques, Brazilian racing driver
- 1976 – Drew Powell, American actor
- 1976 – Marsha Thomason, English actress
- 1977 – Benjamin Ayres, Canadian actor, director, and photographer
- 1979 – Svetlana Khorkina, Russian gymnast and sportscaster
- 1979 – Byung-hyun Kim, South Korean baseball player
- 1979 – Josu Sarriegi, Spanish footballer
- 1979 – Wiley, English rapper and producer
- 1979 – Coral Smith, American TV personality
- 1980 – Jenson Button, English racing driver
- 1980 – Pasha Kovalev, Russian-American dancer and choreographer
- 1980 – Luke Macfarlane, Canadian-American actor and singer
- 1980 – Arvydas Macijauskas, Lithuanian basketball player
- 1980 – Michael Vandort, Sri Lankan cricketer
- 1981 – Paolo Bugia, Filipino basketball player
- 1981 – Asier del Horno, Spanish footballer
- 1981 – Lucho González, Argentinian footballer
- 1981 – Maxime Laisney, French politician
- 1981 – Elizabeth Tulloch, American actress
- 1982 – Pete Buttigieg, American politician
- 1982 – Mike Komisarek, American ice hockey player
- 1982 – Jodie Sweetin, American actress and singer
- 1982 – Robin tom Rink, German singer-songwriter
- 1982 – Shane Tronc, Australian rugby league player
- 1982 – Kim Yoo-suk, South Korean pole vaulter
- 1983 – Hikaru Utada, American-Japanese singer-songwriter and producer
- 1984 – Johnny Boychuk, Canadian ice hockey player
- 1984 – Fabio Catacchini, Italian footballer
- 1984 – Karun Chandhok, Indian racing driver
- 1984 – Elvis Dumervil, American football player
- 1984 – Jimmy Kébé, Malian footballer
- 1984 – Thomas Vanek, Austrian ice hockey player
- 1985 – Pascal Behrenbruch, German decathlete
- 1985 – Damien Chazelle, American film director, screenwriter, and producer
- 1985 – Benny Feilhaber, American soccer player
- 1985 – Esteban Guerrieri, Argentinian racing driver
- 1985 – Rika Ishikawa, Japanese singer and actress
- 1985 – Aleksandr Yevgenyevich Nikulin, Russian footballer
- 1985 – Elliott Ward, English footballer
- 1986 – Claudio Marchisio, Italian footballer
- 1986 – Oleksandr Miroshnychenko, Ukrainian footballer
- 1986 – Moussa Sow, Senegalese footballer
- 1987 – Edgar Manucharyan, Armenian footballer
- 1988 – Tyler Breeze, Canadian wrestler
- 1988 – JaVale McGee, American basketball player
- 1990 – Tatiana Búa, Argentine tennis player
- 1990 – Shaunette Renée Wilson, Guyanese-American actress
- 1991 – Petra Martić, Croatian tennis player
- 1991 – Erin Sanders, American actress
- 1992 – Shawn Johnson East, American gymnast
- 1992 – Logan Lerman, American actor
- 1992 – Mac Miller, American rapper (died 2018)
- 1993 – Erick Torres Padilla, Mexican footballer
- 1993 – João Mário, Portuguese footballer
- 1993 – Ricardo Centurión, Argentine footballer
- 1993 – Walter Benítez, Argentine footballer
- 1993 – Jack Schlossberg, American writer and political candidate
- 1994 – Matthias Ginter, German footballer
- 1994 – Alfie Mawson, English footballer
- 1994 – Marvelous Nakamba, Zimbabwean footballer
- 1996 – Jakub Jankto, Czech footballer
- 1998 – Emre Guler, Australian rugby league player
- 1999 – Jonathan Taylor, American football player
- 1999 – Donyell Malen, Dutch footballer
- 2003 – Felix Afena-Gyan, Ghanaian footballer

== Deaths ==
=== Pre-1600 ===
- 520 – John of Cappadocia, patriarch of Constantinople
- 639 – Dagobert I, Frankish king (born 603)
- 914 – García I, king of León
- 1003 – Kilian of Cologne, Irish abbot
- 1302 – Al-Hakim I, caliph of Cairo
- 1526 – Isabella of Austria, Danish queen (born 1501)
- 1547 – Henry Howard, Earl of Surrey, English poet (born 1516)
- 1565 – Diego Laynez, Spanish Jesuit theologian (born 1512)
- 1571 – Paris Bordone, Venetian painter (born 1495)
- 1576 – Hans Sachs, German poet and playwright (born 1494)
- 1597 – Maharana Pratap, Hindu Rajput king of Mewar (born1540)

=== 1601–1900 ===
- 1636 – Marcus Gheeraerts the Younger, Flemish painter (born1561)
- 1661 – Thomas Venner, English rebel leader
- 1729 – William Congreve, English playwright and poet (born 1670)
- 1755 – Jean-Pierre Christin, French physicist, mathematician, and astronomer (born 1683)
- 1757 – Thomas Ruddiman, Scottish scholar and academic (born 1674)
- 1766 – Giovanni Niccolò Servandoni, Italian-French architect and painter (born 1695)
- 1785 – Jonathan Toup, English scholar and critic (born 1713)
- 1833 – Ferdinand Hérold, French pianist and composer (born 1791)
- 1847 – Charles Bent, American soldier and politician, first Governor of New Mexico (born 1799)
- 1847 – Athanasios Christopoulos, Greek poet (born 1772)
- 1851 – Esteban Echeverría, Argentinian poet and author (born 1805)
- 1853 – Karl Faber, German historian and academic (born 1773)
- 1862 – Felix Zollicoffer, American newspaperman, politician, and Confederate general (born 1812)
- 1865 – Pierre-Joseph Proudhon, French philosopher and politician (born 1809)
- 1869 – Carl Reichenbach, German chemist and philosopher (born 1788)
- 1874 – August Heinrich Hoffmann von Fallersleben, German poet and scholar (born 1798)
- 1878 – Henri Victor Regnault, French physicist and chemist (born 1810)
- 1895 – António Luís de Seabra, 1st Viscount of Seabra, Portuguese magistrate and politician (born 1798)

=== 1901–present ===
- 1906 – Bartolomé Mitre, Argentinian historian and politician, sixth President of Argentina (born 1821)
- 1915 – Ernest de Munck, Belgian cellist and composer (born 1840)
- 1929 – Liang Qichao, Chinese journalist, philosopher, and scholar (born 1873)
- 1930 – Frank P. Ramsey, British mathematician, philosopher and economist (born 1903)
- 1938 – Branislav Nušić, Serbian author, playwright, and journalist (born 1864)
- 1945 – Gustave Mesny, French general (born 1886)
- 1948 – Tony Garnier, French architect and urban planner, designed the Stade de Gerland (born 1869)
- 1954 – Theodor Kaluza, German mathematician and physicist (born 1885)
- 1957 – József Dudás, Romanian-Hungarian activist and politician (born 1912)
- 1963 – Clement Smoot, American golfer (born 1884)
- 1964 – Firmin Lambot, Belgian cyclist (born 1886)
- 1965 – Arnold Luhaäär, Estonian weightlifter (born 1905)
- 1968 – Ray Harroun, American race car driver and engineer (born 1879)
- 1972 – Michael Rabin, American violinist (born 1936)
- 1973 – Max Adrian, Irish-English actor (born 1903)
- 1975 – Thomas Hart Benton, American painter and educator (born 1889)
- 1976 – Hidetsugu Yagi, Japanese engineer and academic (born 1886)
- 1979 – Moritz Jahn, German novelist and poet (born 1884)
- 1980 – William O. Douglas, American lawyer and jurist, US Supreme Court associate justice (born 1898)
- 1981 – Francesca Woodman, American photographer (born 1958)
- 1982 – Elis Regina, Brazilian soprano (born 1945)
- 1983 – Ham, chimpanzee and animal astronaut, first hominid in space (born 1957)
- 1984 – Max Bentley, Canadian ice hockey player and coach (born 1920)
- 1990 – Bhagwan Shree Rajneesh, Indian guru and mystic (born 1931)
- 1990 – Alberto Semprini, English pianist, composer, and conductor (born 1908)
- 1990 – Herbert Wehner, German politician, sixth Minister of Intra-German Relations (born 1906)
- 1991 – Marcel Chaput, Canadian biochemist and journalist (born 1918)
- 1995 – Gene MacLellan, Canadian singer-songwriter (born 1938)
- 1996 – Don Simpson, American actor, producer, and screenwriter (born 1943)
- 1997 – James Dickey, American poet and novelist (born 1923)
- 1998 – Carl Perkins, American singer-songwriter and guitarist (born 1932)
- 1999 – Ivan Francescato, Italian rugby player (born 1967)
- 1999 – Robert Eugene Brashers, American serial killer and rapist (born 1958)
- 2000 – Amatu'l-Bahá Rúhíyyih Khánum, a Baháʼí Faith Hand of the Cause of God and wife of Shoghi Effendi (born 1910)
- 2000 – Bettino Craxi, Italian lawyer and politician, 45th Prime Minister of Italy (born 1934)
- 2000 – Hedy Lamarr, Austrian-American actress, singer, and mathematician (born 1914)
- 2002 – Vavá, Brazilian footballer and manager (born 1934)
- 2003 – Milton Flores, Honduran footballer (born 1974)
- 2003 – Françoise Giroud, French journalist, screenwriter, and politician, French Minister of Culture (born 1916)
- 2004 – Harry E. Claiborne, American lawyer and judge (born 1917)
- 2004 – David Hookes, Australian cricketer and coach (born 1955)
- 2005 – K. Sello Duiker, South African author and screenwriter (born 1974)
- 2006 – Anthony Franciosa, American actor (born 1928)
- 2006 – Wilson Pickett, American singer-songwriter (born 1941)
- 2007 – Hrant Dink, Turkish-Armenian journalist and activist (born 1954)
- 2007 – Denny Doherty, Canadian singer-songwriter (born 1940)
- 2007 – Murat Nasyrov, Russian singer-songwriter (born 1969)
- 2008 – Suzanne Pleshette, American actress (born 1937)
- 2008 – John Stewart, American singer-songwriter and guitarist (born 1939)
- 2008 – Don Wittman, Canadian sportscaster (born 1936)
- 2010 – Bill McLaren, Scottish rugby player and sportscaster (born 1923)
- 2012 – Peter Åslin, Swedish ice hockey player (born 1962)
- 2012 – Sarah Burke, Canadian skier (born 1982)
- 2012 – Winston Riley, Jamaican singer-songwriter and producer (born 1943)
- 2012 – Rudi van Dantzig, Dutch ballet dancer and choreographer (born 1933)
- 2013 – Taihō Kōki, Japanese sumo wrestler, the 48th Yokozuna (born 1940)
- 2013 – Stan Musial, American baseball player and manager (born 1920)
- 2013 – Frank Pooler, American conductor and composer (born 1926)
- 2013 – Earl Weaver, American baseball player and manager (born 1930)
- 2013 – Toktamış Ateş, Turkish academician, political commentator, columnist and writer (born 1944)
- 2014 – Azaria Alon, Ukrainian-Israeli environmentalist, co-founded the Society for the Protection of Nature in Israel (born 1918)
- 2014 – Christopher Chataway, English runner, journalist, and politician (born 1931)
- 2015 – Justin Capră, Romanian engineer and academic (born 1933)
- 2015 – Michel Guimond, Canadian lawyer and politician (born 1953)
- 2015 – Ward Swingle, American-French singer-songwriter and conductor (born 1927)
- 2016 – Richard Levins, American ecologist and geneticist (born 1930)
- 2016 – Ettore Scola, Italian director and screenwriter (born 1931)
- 2016 – Sheila Sim (Lady Attenborough), English actress (born 1922)
- 2017 – Miguel Ferrer, American actor (born 1955)
- 2025 – Jeff Torborg, American baseball player and manager (born 1941)
- 2026 – Valentino, Italian fashion designer, founder of Valentino (born 1932)

== Holidays and observances ==
- Christian feast day:
  - Bassianus of Lodi
  - Faustina and Liberata of Como
  - Henry of Uppsala
  - Marius, Martha, Audifax, and Abachum
  - Mark of Ephesus (Eastern Orthodox Church)
  - Pontianus of Spoleto
  - Wulfstan, Bishop of Worcester
  - January 19 (Eastern Orthodox liturgics)
- Confederate Heroes Day (Texas), and its related observance:
  - Robert E. Lee Day (Alabama, Arkansas, Florida, Georgia and Mississippi)
- Husband's Day (Iceland)
- Kokborok Day (Tripura, India)
- Theophany / Epiphany (Eastern and Oriental Orthodoxy), and its related observances:
  - Timkat, or 20 during Leap Year (Ethiopian Orthodox)
  - Vodici or Baptism of Jesus (North Macedonia)
