= 2023 La Pedrera TCR World Tour round =

Car racing event

(Argentina) 2023 La Pedrera TCR World Tour round
Race details
- Date: 25–27 August, 2023
- Location: Villa Mercedes, Argentina
- Course: Autódromo José Carlos Bassi; 4.368 kilometres (2.714 mi)

Race One
- Laps: 12 (25 minutes + 1 lap)
Pole position
| Driver | | (France) Yann Ehrlacher | (Sweden) Cyan Racing Lynk & Co |
| Time | | 1:53.871 | |
Podium
| First | | (Spain) Mikel Azcona | (Italy) BRC Hyundai N Squadra Corse |
| Second | | (Hungary) Norbert Michelisz | (Italy) BRC Hyundai N Squadra Corse |
| Third | | (United Kingdom) Robert Huff | (Belgium) Audi Sport Team Comtoyou |
Fastest Lap
| Driver | | (Spain) Mikel Azcona | (Italy) BRC Hyundai N Squadra Corse |
| Time | | 1:51.284 | |

Race Two
- Laps: 17 (30 minutes + 1 lap)
Podium
| First | | (Argentina) Néstor Girolami | (Argentina) Squadra Martino |
| Second | | (China) Ma Qing Hua | (Sweden) Cyan Racing Lynk & Co |
| Third | | (United Kingdom) Robert Huff | (Belgium) Audi Sport Team Comtoyou |
Fastest Lap
| Driver | | (France) Yann Ehrlacher | (Sweden) Cyan Racing Lynk & Co |
| Time | | 1:47.331 | |

The 2023 La Pedrera TCR World Tour round was the sixth round of 2023 TCR World Tour. It was held on 25–27 August 2023 at the Autódromo José Carlos Bassi in Villa Mercedes, Argentina. The event was also the seventh round of 2023 TCR South America Touring Car Championship. Mikel Azcona won the dramatic race on Saturday, with his teammate Norbert Michelisz completing a 1-2 for BRC Hyundai; and Néstor Girolami won the race on Sunday.

== Entry list ==
A total of 25 cars have been entered, including entries from TCR World Tour and TCR South America.

| Team | Car | No. | Drivers |
|---|---|---|---|
| (Argentina) Paladini Racing | Toyota GR Corolla Sport TCR | 2 | (Argentina) Juan Ángel Rosso |
| (Argentina) Paladini Racing | Toyota GR Corolla Sport TCR | 5 | (Argentina) Fabián Yannantuoni |
| (Brazil) Cobra Racing Team | Toyota GR Corolla Sport TCR | 10 | (Brazil) Adalberto Baptista |
| (Argentina) Squadra Martino | Honda Civic Type R TCR (FK8) | 15 | (Uruguay) Enrique Maglione |
| Toyota Team Argentina | Toyota GR Corolla Sport TCR | 17 | (Argentina) Bernardo Llaver |
| (Argentina) PMO Motorsport | Lynk & Co 03 TCR | 22 | (Argentina) Matias Milla |
| (Argentina) Squadra Martino | Honda Civic Type R TCR (FK8) | 23 | (Argentina) Ignacio Montenegro |
| (Argentina) PMO Motorsport | Lynk & Co 03 TCR | 24 | (Uruguay) Frederick Balbi |
| (Brazil) W2 ProGP | CUPRA Leon Competicion TCR | 28 | (Brazil) Galid Osman |
| Toyota Team Argentina | Toyota GR Corolla Sport TCR | 33 | (Argentina) José Manuel Sapag |
| (Argentina) Squadra Martino | Honda Civic Type R TCR (FK8) | 34 | (Brazil) Fabio Casagrande |
| (Brazil) Scuderia Chiarelli | Hyundai Elantra N TCR | 43 | (Brazil) Pedro Cardoso |
| (Argentina) Squadra Martino | Honda Civic Type R TCR (FK8) | 60 | (Uruguay) Juan Manuel Casella |
| (Brazil) Cobra Racing Team | Toyota GR Corolla Sport TCR | 70 | (Brazil) Diego Nunes |
| (Brazil) W2 ProGP | CUPRA Leon Competicion TCR | 77 | (Brazil) Raphael Reis |
| (Argentina) Bratton Tito Bessone Team | Toyota GR Corolla Sport TCR | 86 | (Argentina) Esteban Guerrieri |
| (Italy) BRC Hyundai N Squadra Corse | Hyundai Elantra N TCR | 105 | (Hungary) Norbert Michelisz |
| (Sweden) Cyan Racing Lynk & Co | Lynk & Co 03 FL TCR | 111 | (Sweden) Thed Björk |
| (Sweden) Cyan Racing Lynk & Co | Lynk & Co 03 FL TCR | 112 | (Uruguay) Santiago Urrutia |
| (Belgium) Audi Sport Team Comtoyou | Audi RS 3 LMS TCR (2021) | 122 | (Belgium) Frédéric Vervisch |
| (Argentina) Squadra Martino Racing | Honda Civic Type R TCR (FL5) | 129 | (Argentina) Néstor Girolami |
| (Sweden) Cyan Racing Lynk & Co | Lynk & Co 03 FL TCR | 155 | (China) Ma Qing Hua |
| (Sweden) Cyan Racing Lynk & Co | Lynk & Co 03 FL TCR | 168 | (France) Yann Ehrlacher |
| (Belgium) Audi Sport Team Comtoyou | Audi RS 3 LMS TCR (2021) | 179 | (United Kingdom) Robert Huff |
| (Italy) BRC Hyundai N Squadra Corse | Hyundai Elantra N TCR | 196 | (Spain) Mikel Azcona |

== Results ==
=== Qualifying ===
| Pos. | No. | Name | Team | Car | Q1 Time | Q2 Time | Points |
|---|---|---|---|---|---|---|---|
| 1 | 168 | (France) Yann Ehrlacher | Cyan Racing Lynk & Co | Lynk & Co 03 FL TCR | 1:47.878 | 1:53.871 | 15 |
| 2 | 105 | (Hungary) Norbert Michelisz | BRC Hyundai N Squadra Corse | Hyundai Elantra N TCR | 1:49.012 | 1:54.104 | 10 |
| 3 | 196 | (Spain) Mikel Azcona | BRC Hyundai N Squadra Corse | Hyundai Elantra N TCR | 1:46.574 | 1:54.246 | 8 |
| 4 | 179 | (United Kingdom) Robert Huff | Audi Sport Team Comtoyou | Audi RS 3 LMS TCR (2021) | 1:48.973 | 1:54.817 | 6 |
| 5 | 112 | (Uruguay) Santiago Urrutia | Cyan Racing Lynk & Co | Lynk & Co 03 FL TCR | 1:48.082 | 1:54.870^{1} | 4 |
| 6 | 155 | (China) Ma Qing Hua | Cyan Racing Lynk & Co | Lynk & Co 03 FL TCR | 1:47.078 | 1:55.458 | 2 |
| 7 | 111 | (Sweden) Thed Björk | Cyan Racing Lynk & Co | Lynk & Co 03 FL TCR | 1:47.983 | 1:55.934 | |
| 8 | 122 | (Belgium) Frédéric Vervisch | Audi Sport Team Comtoyou | Audi RS 3 LMS TCR (2021) | 1:48.584 | 1:56.574 | |
| 9 | 43 | (Brazil) Pedro Cardoso | Scuderia Chiarelli | Hyundai Elantra N TCR | 1:48.299 | 1:58.557 | |
| 10 | 129 | (Argentina) Néstor Girolami | Squadra Martino | Honda Civic Type R TCR (FL5) | 1:47.524 | 2:02.352 | |
| 11 | 5 | (Argentina) Fabián Yannantuoni | Paladini Racing | Toyota GR Corolla Sport TCR | 1:49.049 | 2:02.576 | |
| 12 | 17 | (Argentina) Bernardo Llaver | Toyota Team Argentina | Toyota GR Corolla Sport TCR | 1:49.419 | - | |
| 13 | 22 | (Argentina) Matías Milla | PMO Motorsport | Lynk & Co 03 TCR | 1:49.517 | - | |
| 14 | 2 | (Argentina) Juan Ángel Rosso | Paladini Racing | Toyota GR Corolla Sport TCR | 1:49.564 | - | |
| 15 | 70 | (Brazil) Diego Nunes | Cobra Racing Team | Toyota GR Corolla Sport TCR | 1:49.964 | - | |
| 16 | 23 | (Argentina) Ignacio Montenegro | Squadra Martino | Honda Civic Type R TCR (FK8) | 1:50.906 | - | |
| 17 | 28 | (Brazil) Galid Osman | W2 ProGP | CUPRA Leon Competicion TCR | 1:50.938 | - | |
| 18 | 33 | (Argentina) José Manuel Sapag | Toyota Team Argentina | Toyota GR Corolla Sport TCR | 1:52.288 | - | |
| 19 | 86 | (Argentina) Esteban Guerrieri | Bratton Tito Bessone Team | Toyota GR Corolla Sport TCR | 1:53.186 | - | |
| 20 | 24 | (Uruguay) Frederick Balbi | PMO Motorsport | Lynk & Co 03 TCR | 1:53.384 | - | |
| 21 | 60 | (Uruguay) Juan Manuel Casella | Squadra Martino | Honda Civic Type R TCR (FK8) | 1:53.437 | - | |
| 22 | 15 | (Uruguay) Enrique Maglione | Squadra Martino | Honda Civic Type R TCR (FK8) | 1:54.010 | - | |
| 23 | 34 | (Brazil) Fabio Casagrande | Squadra Martino | Honda Civic Type R TCR (FK8) | 1:55.950 | - | |
| 24 | 10 | (Brazil) Adalberto Baptista | Cobra Racing Team | Toyota GR Corolla Sport TCR | 1:56.127 | - | |
| 25 | 77 | (Brazil) Raphael Reis | W2 ProGP | CUPRA Leon Competicion TCR | 1:49.108 | No time^{2} | |

- ^1 – Santiago Urrutia originally qualified 6th, but was relegated to the back of the grid after qualifying.
- ^2 – Raphael Reis originally qualified 10th, but he was excluded from qualifying due to a technical infringement and therefore relegated to the back of the grid for both races.

=== Race 1 ===
Norbert Michelisz took the lead from Ehrlacher on the start, with Huff soon making his way past the Frenchman as well. Robert Huff took the lead from Michelisz, with the Hungarian driver dropping to 5th, right before the Safety Car deployment, due to the stranded car Lynk & Co of Matías Milla. Raphael Reis, who was relegated to the back of the grid due to technical infringement in qualifying, retired due to steering damage before the race even started. Enrique Maglione retired in pit lane with damage to the front of his car, with Santiago Urrutia also stopping on track. Pedro Cardoso dropped to the back of the grid for unknown reasons. After 10 minutes, Azcona closed on Huff, while Michelisz and Girolami both overtook Ehrlacher, with the Lynk & Co driver struggling with tyre choice. Girolami soon stopped his car on track due to a mechanical failure, triggering another Safety Car. Huff's teammate Frederic Vervisch pulled into the pit lane under the SC conditions with visible damage to his Audi, after colliding with Juan Ángel Rosso. The race was restarted for one lap, with Huff making a mistake and going wide in one corner and dropping to 3rd, behind both BRC Hyundai cars. Azcona managed to keep his lead after Huff's mistake and took his first win of the season, with Michelisz coming in 2nd place and getting BRC Hyundai their third 1-2 of the season. Fabián Yannantuoni took the win in TCR South America, finishing 5th overall.

| Pos. | No. | Name | Team | Car | Laps | Time/retired | Grid | Points |
|---|---|---|---|---|---|---|---|---|
| 1 | 196 | (Spain) Mikel Azcona | (Italy) BRC Hyundai N Squadra Corse | Hyundai Elantra N TCR | 12 | Winner | 3 | 30 |
| 2 | 105 | (Hungary) Norbert Michelisz | BRC Hyundai N Squadra Corse | Hyundai Elantra N TCR | 12 | +1.131 | 2 | 25 |
| 3 | 179 | (United Kingdom) Robert Huff | Audi Sport Team Comtoyou | Audi RS 3 LMS TCR (2021) | 12 | +1.638 | 4 | 22 |
| 4 | 155 | (China) Ma Qing Hua | Cyan Racing Lynk & Co | Lynk & Co 03 FL TCR | 12 | +2.128 | 6 | 20 |
| 5 | 5 | (Argentina) Fabián Yannantuoni | Paladini Racing | Toyota GR Corolla Sport TCR | 12 | +3.102 | 11 | 18 |
| 6 | 168 | (France) Yann Ehrlacher | Cyan Racing Lynk & Co | Lynk & Co 03 FL TCR | 12 | +3.904 | 1 | 16 |
| 7 | 2 | (Argentina) Juan Ángel Rosso | Paladini Racing | Toyota GR Corolla Sport TCR | 12 | +4.725 | 13 | 14 |
| 8 | 17 | (Argentina) Bernardo Llaver | Toyota Team Argentina | Toyota GR Corolla Sport TCR | 12 | +6.170 | 11 | 12 |
| 9 | 23 | (Argentina) Ignacio Montenegro | Squadra Martino | Honda Civic Type R TCR (FK8) | 12 | +6.888 | | 10 |
| 10 | 43 | (Brazil) Pedro Cardoso | Scuderia Chiarelli | Hyundai Elantra N TCR | 12 | +7.395 | 8 | 8 |
| 11 | 86 | (Argentina) Esteban Guerrieri | Bratton Tito Bessone Team | Toyota GR Corolla Sport TCR | 12 | +7.895 | 18 | 6 |
| 12 | 24 | (Uruguay) Frederick Balbi | PMO Motorsport | Lynk & Co 03 TCR | 12 | +10.155 | 19 | 4 |
| 13 | 28 | (Brazil) Galid Osman | W2 ProGP | CUPRA Leon Competicion TCR | 12 | +10.249 | 16 | 3 |
| 14 | 70 | (Brazil) Diego Nunes | Cobra Racing Team | Toyota GR Corolla Sport TCR | 12 | +13.160 | 14 | 2 |
| 15 | 33 | (Argentina) José Manuel Sapag | Toyota Team Argentina | Toyota GR Corolla Sport TCR | 12 | +13.266 | 17 | 1 |
| 16 | 60 | (Uruguay) Juan Manuel Casella | Squadra Martino | Honda Civic Type R TCR (FK8) | 12 | +16.948 | 20 | |
| 17 | 10 | (Brazil) Adalberto Baptista | Cobra Racing Team | Toyota GR Corolla Sport TCR | 12 | +22.550 | 23 | |
| 18 | 34 | (Brazil) Fabio Casagrande | Squadra Martino | Honda Civic Type R TCR (FK8) | 12 | +1:13.682 | 22 | |
| 19 | 122 | (Belgium) Frédéric Vervisch | Audi Sport Team Comtoyou | Audi RS 3 LMS TCR (2021) | 10 | +2 laps | 7 | |
| 20 | 129 | (Argentina) Néstor Girolami | Squadra Martino | Honda Civic Type R TCR (FL5) | 8 | Engine | 9 | |
| 21 | 111 | (Sweden) Thed Björk | Cyan Racing Lynk & Co | Lynk & Co 03 FL TCR | 6 | Retired | 6 | |
| 22 | 112 | (Uruguay) Santiago Urrutia | Cyan Racing Lynk & Co | Lynk & Co 03 FL TCR | 2 | Overhating | 24 | |
| 23 | 15 | (Uruguay) Enrique Maglione | Squadra Martino | Honda Civic Type R TCR (FK8) | 2 | Accident damage | 21 | |
| 24 | 22 | (Argentina) Matías Milla | PMO Motorsport | Lynk & Co 03 TCR | 1 | Accident | 12 | |
| 25 | 77 | (Brazil) Raphael Reis | W2 ProGP | CUPRA Leon Competicion TCR | 0 | Mechanical | 25 | |
Fastest lap: Mikel Azcona, 1:51.284 / Source:

=== Race 2 ===
| Pos. | No. | Name | Team | Car | Laps | Time/retired | Grid | Points |
|---|---|---|---|---|---|---|---|---|
| 1 | 129 | (Argentina) Néstor Girolami | Squadra Martino | Honda Civic Type R TCR (FL5) | 17 | Winner | 1 | 30 |
| 2 | 155 | (China) Ma Qing Hua | Cyan Racing Lynk & Co | Lynk & Co 03 FL TCR | 17 | +0.758 | 5 | 25 |
| 3 | 179 | (United Kingdom) Robert Huff | Audi Sport Team Comtoyou | Audi RS 3 LMS TCR (2021) | 17 | +5.290 | 7 | 22 |
| 4 | 105 | (Hungary) Norbert Michelisz | BRC Hyundai N Squadra Corse | Hyundai Elantra N TCR | 17 | +7.866 | 9 | 20 |
| 5 | 122 | (Belgium) Frédéric Vervisch | Audi Sport Team Comtoyou | Audi RS 3 LMS TCR (2021) | 17 | +23.276 | 3 | 18 |
| 6 | 111 | (Sweden) Thed Björk | Cyan Racing Lynk & Co | Lynk & Co 03 FL TCR | 17 | +23.575 | 4 | 16 |
| 7 | 17 | (Argentina) Bernardo Llaver | Toyota Team Argentina | Toyota GR Corolla Sport TCR | 17 | +24.746 | 12 | 14 |
| 8 | 77 | (Brazil) Raphael Reis | W2 ProGP | CUPRA Leon Competicion TCR | 17 | +32.097 | 25 | 12 |
| 9 | 28 | (Brazil) Galid Osman | W2 ProGP | CUPRA Leon Competicion TCR | 17 | +34.265 | 17 | 10 |
| 10 | 86 | (Argentina) Esteban Guerrieri | Bratton Tito Bessone Team | Toyota GR Corolla Sport TCR | 17 | +39.833 | 19 | 8 |
| 11 | 112 | (Uruguay) Santiago Urrutia | Cyan Racing Lynk & Co | Lynk & Co 03 FL TCR | 17 | +42.905^{1} | 6 | 6 |
| 12 | 33 | (Argentina) José Manuel Sapag | Toyota Team Argentina | Toyota GR Corolla Sport TCR | 17 | +52.821 | 18 | 4 |
| 13 | 60 | (Uruguay) Juan Manuel Casella | Squadra Martino | Honda Civic Type R TCR (FK8) | 17 | +58.282 | 21 | 3 |
| 14 | 23 | (Argentina) Ignacio Montenegro | Squadra Martino | Honda Civic Type R TCR (FK8) | 17 | +1:49.596 | 16 | 2 |
| 15 | 10 | (Brazil) Adalberto Baptista | Cobra Racing Team | Toyota GR Corolla Sport TCR | 17 | +2:12.682 | 24 | 1 |
| 16 | 168 | (France) Yann Ehrlacher | Cyan Racing Lynk & Co | Lynk & Co 03 FL TCR | 16 | +1 lap^{2} | 10 | |
| 17 | 2 | (Argentina) Juan Ángel Rosso | Paladini Racing | Toyota GR Corolla Sport TCR | 10 | Retired | 14 | |
| 18 | 70 | (Brazil) Diego Nunes | Cobra Racing Team | Toyota GR Corolla Sport TCR | 7 | Retired | 15 | |
| 19 | 34 | (Brazil) Fabio Casagrande | Squadra Martino | Honda Civic Type R TCR (FK8) | 5 | Retired | 23 | |
| 20 | 196 | (Spain) Mikel Azcona | (Italy) BRC Hyundai N Squadra Corse | Hyundai Elantra N TCR | 5 | Accident damage | 8 | |
| 21 | 22 | (Argentina) Matías Milla | PMO Motorsport | Lynk & Co 03 TCR | 2 | Retired | 13 | |
| 22 | 15 | (Uruguay) Enrique Maglione | Squadra Martino | Honda Civic Type R TCR (FK8) | 1 | Retired | 22 | |
| 23 | 5 | (Argentina) Fabián Yannantuoni | Paladini Racing | Toyota GR Corolla Sport TCR | 1 | Accident damage | 11 | |
| 24 | 24 | (Uruguay) Frederick Balbi | PMO Motorsport | Lynk & Co 03 TCR | 1 | Accident | 20 | |
| 25 | 43 | (Brazil) Pedro Cardoso | Scuderia Chiarelli | Hyundai Elantra N TCR | 17 | Excluded^{3} | 2 | |
Fastest lap: Yann Ehrlacher, 1:47.331 / Source:

- ^1 – Santiago Urrutia originally finished 5th, but received a 30-second time penalty post-race for the collision with Mikel Azcona.
- ^2 – Yann Ehrlacher was involved in a crash with Norbert Michelisz on the final lap, but was classified as he completed most of the race.
- ^3 – Pedro Cardoso originally finished 8th, but was disqualified post-race due to his car failing a minimum ride height test.

== Standings after the round ==
Drivers' championship standings

| Pos | Driver | Points | Change |
|---|---|---|---|
| 1 | (Hungary) Norbert Michelisz | 270 | 1 |
| 2 | (France) Yann Ehrlacher | 266 | 1 |
| 3 | (United Kingdom) Robert Huff | 247 | 1 |
| 4 | (Spain) Mikel Azcona | 243 | 1 |
| 5 | (Argentina) Néstor Girolami | 220 | 1 |

Teams' championship standings

| Pos | Driver | Points | Change |
|---|---|---|---|
| 1 | (Sweden) Cyan Racing Lynk & Co | 642 | |
| 2 | (Italy) BRC Hyundai N Squadra Corse | 523 | |
| 3 | (Belgium) Audi Sport Team Comtoyou | 471 | |
| 4 | (Estonia) ALM Motorsport | 182 | |
| 5 | (Belgium) Comtoyou Racing | 148 | |
