= Moritz Jahn =

Moritz Jahn may refer to:

- Moritz Jahn (writer) (1884–1979), Lower German novelist and an educator
- Moritz Jahn (actor) (born 1995), German actor and musician
