= 2023 TCR South America Touring Car Championship =

Motor racing competition

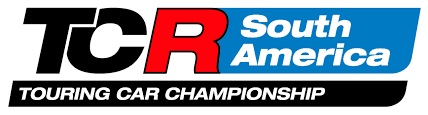
Official Logo

The 2023 TCR South America Touring Car Championship was the third season of TCR South America Touring Car Championship.

== Calendar ==
The championship is to begin in March 2023, with a maximum of 26 entries, ten rounds consisting of eighteen 35-minute races and two endurance races would be run in Argentina, Brazil and Uruguay. It will also feature two rounds of the TCR World Tour. In September 2023, it was announced that the round at Autódromo Internacional Nelson Piquet was replaced by the round at Autódromo Internacional de Cascavel on the same date.

Race is an Endurance Event
Race is part of TCR Brazil
Race is an endurance event and part of TCR Brazil
Race is part of TCR World Tour

Rnd.	Circuit/Location	Date
1	(Argentina) Autódromo Oscar Cabalén, Alta Gracia	25–26 March
2	(Argentina) Autódromo Municipal Juan Manuel Fangio, Rosario	15–16 April
3	(Argentina) Autódromo Termas de Río Hondo, Termas de Río Hondo	29–30 April
4	(Brazil) Autódromo José Carlos Pace, São Paulo	10–11 June
5	(Uruguay) Autódromo Eduardo Prudêncio Cabrera, Rivera	22–23 July
6	(Uruguay) Autódromo Víctor Borrat Fabini, El Pinar	19–20 August
7	(Argentina) Autódromo José Carlos Bassi, Villa Mercedes	26–27 August
8	(Brazil) Velopark, Nova Santa Rita	23–24 September
9	(Brazil) Autódromo Velo Città, Mogi Guaçu	21–22 October
10	(Brazil) Autódromo Internacional de Cascavel, Cascavel	2–3 December

== Teams and drivers ==
Team	Car	No.	Drivers	Class	Rounds	Co-Driver name	Rounds
(Argentina) PMO Motorsport	Lynk & Co 03 TCR	1	(Argentina) Fabricio Pezzini		1–2	—N/a	
(Argentina) PMO Motorsport	Lynk & Co 03 TCR	3	(Brazil) Marcos Regadas	B	9	—N/a	
(Argentina) PMO Motorsport	Lynk & Co 03 TCR	8	(Brazil) Rafael Suzuki	B	1–6, 8–10	(Argentina) Matías Signorelli	3–4
(Argentina) PMO Motorsport	Lynk & Co 03 TCR	12	(Argentina) Claudio Rama	T	4	(Argentina) Leandro Rama	4
(Argentina) PMO Motorsport	Lynk & Co 03 TCR	20	(Argentina) Pablo Otero	T	3	(Argentina) Leandro Rama	3
(Argentina) PMO Motorsport	Lynk & Co 03 TCR	21	(Brazil) Marcio Basso	T	4	(Argentina) Gonzalo Alterio	4
(Argentina) PMO Motorsport	Lynk & Co 03 TCR	22	(Argentina) Matías Milla		7	—N/a	
(Argentina) PMO Motorsport	Lynk & Co 03 TCR	24	(Uruguay) Frederick Balbi		1–7	(Argentina) Matías Russo	3
(Argentina) PMO Motorsport	Lynk & Co 03 TCR	24	(Uruguay) Frederick Balbi		1–7	(Brazil) Nelson Marcondes	4
(Argentina) PMO Motorsport	Lynk & Co 03 TCR	27	(Argentina) Walter Hernández		1	—N/a	
(Argentina) PMO Motorsport	Lynk & Co 03 TCR	87	(Argentina) Franco Farina		3	(Uruguay) Michel Bonnin	3
(Argentina) Paladini Racing	Audi RS 3 LMS TCR (2017)	1	(Argentina) Fabricio Pezzini		5–6	—N/a	
(Argentina) Paladini Racing	Audi RS 3 LMS TCR (2017)	55	(Argentina) Diego Gutierrez	T	10	—N/a	
(Argentina) Paladini Racing	Toyota GR Corolla Sport TCR	2	(Argentina) Juan Ángel Rosso	B	All	(Argentina) Luciano Farroni	3–4
(Argentina) Paladini Racing	Toyota GR Corolla Sport TCR	5	(Argentina) Fabián Yannantuoni	B	All	(Argentina) Fabricio Pezzini	3
(Argentina) Paladini Racing	Toyota GR Corolla Sport TCR	5	(Argentina) Fabián Yannantuoni	B	All	(Brazil) Beto Monteiro	4
(Argentina) PMO Racing	Peugeot 308 TCR	7	(Argentina) Juan Pablo Bessone		1–5	(Argentina) Ever Franetovich	3
(Argentina) PMO Racing	Peugeot 308 TCR	7	(Argentina) Juan Pablo Bessone		1–5	(Argentina) Facundo Marques	4
(Argentina) PMO Racing	Peugeot 308 TCR	20	(Argentina) Pablo Otero	T	1–2	—N/a	
(Argentina) PMO Racing	Peugeot 308 TCR	21	(Brazil) Márcio Basso	T B	10	—N/a	
(Argentina) PMO Racing	Peugeot 308 TCR	35	(Uruguay) Gonzalo Reilly		6	—N/a	
(Argentina) PMO Racing	Peugeot 308 TCR	36	(Argentina) Damián Fineschi		5–6	—N/a	
(Argentina) PMO Racing	Peugeot 308 TCR	37	(Brazil) Guilherme Reischl	T B	1, 3–5, 8–10	(Argentina) Ernesto Bessone II	3
(Argentina) PMO Racing	Peugeot 308 TCR	37	(Brazil) Guilherme Reischl	T B	1, 3–5, 8–10	(Brazil) Guilherme Salas	4
(Argentina) PMO Racing	Peugeot 308 TCR	55	(Argentina) Diego Gutierrez	T	1–5	(Argentina) Gustavo Fernigrini	3–4
(Argentina) PMO Racing	Peugeot 308 TCR	72	(Brazil) Lucas Salles	T B	4	(Brazil) Marcos Regadas	4
(Argentina) PMO Racing	Peugeot 308 TCR	88	(Argentina) Facundo Marques		3	(Argentina) Damián Fineschi	3
(Brazil) Cobra Racing Team	Toyota GR Corolla Sport TCR	10	(Brazil) Adalberto Baptista	T B	All	(Brazil) Rodrigo Baptista	3
(Brazil) Cobra Racing Team	Toyota GR Corolla Sport TCR	10	(Brazil) Adalberto Baptista	T B	All	(Brazil) Bruno Baptista	4
(Brazil) Cobra Racing Team	Toyota GR Corolla Sport TCR	70	(Brazil) Diego Nunes	B	3–10	(Brazil) Pedro Nunes	3
(Brazil) Cobra Racing Team	Toyota GR Corolla Sport TCR	70	(Brazil) Diego Nunes	B	3–10	(Brazil) Thiago Vivacqua	4
(Brazil) Cobra Racing Team	Audi RS 3 LMS TCR (2017)	70	(Brazil) Diego Nunes	B	1–2	—N/a	
(Italy) Alfa Racing	Alfa Romeo Giulietta Veloce TCR	13	(Uruguay) Carlos Silva		6	—N/a	
(Italy) Alfa Racing	Alfa Romeo Giulietta TCR	69	(Argentina) Gonzalo Alterio		1–3	(Argentina) Carlos Javier Merlo	3
(Italy) Alfa Racing	Alfa Romeo Giulietta TCR 5 Alfa Romeo Giulietta Veloce TCR 6	90	(Uruguay) Michel Bonnin		5–6	—N/a	
(Argentina) Squadra Martino	Honda Civic Type R TCR (FK8)	15	(Uruguay) Enrique Maglione	T B	All	(Uruguay) Rodrigo Aramendía	3–4
(Argentina) Squadra Martino	Honda Civic Type R TCR (FK8)	23	(Argentina) Ignacio Montenegro	B	All	(Argentina) Lucas Colombo Russell	3–4
(Argentina) Squadra Martino	Honda Civic Type R TCR (FK8)	34	(Brazil) Fabio Casagrande	T B	All	(Argentina) Franco Coscia	3–4
(Argentina) Squadra Martino	Honda Civic Type R TCR (FK8)	60	(Uruguay) Juan Manuel Casella	B	1–7	(Argentina) Matías Milla	3
(Argentina) Squadra Martino	Honda Civic Type R TCR (FK8)	60	(Uruguay) Juan Manuel Casella	B	1–7	(Brazil) Gaetano di Mauro	4
(Argentina) Squadra Martino	Honda Civic Type R TCR (FL5)	60	(Uruguay) Juan Manuel Casella	B	8-10	—N/a	
(Argentina) Squadra Martino	Honda Civic Type R TCR (FL5)	129	(Argentina) Néstor Girolami	W	6–7	—N/a	
Toyota Team Argentina	Toyota GR Corolla Sport TCR	17	(Argentina) Bernardo Llaver		All	(Argentina) Gastón Iansa	3–4
Toyota Team Argentina	Toyota GR Corolla Sport TCR	33	(Argentina) José Manuel Sapag		All	(Argentina) Marcelo Ciarrocchi	3–4
(Brazil) Hyundai N Team Scuderia Chiarelli	Hyundai Elantra N TCR	19	(Brazil) Felipe Papazissis	B	9	—N/a	
(Brazil) Hyundai N Team Scuderia Chiarelli	Hyundai Elantra N TCR	42	(Brazil) Fabiano Cardoso (Note: Not eligible for TCR South America.)	B	8	—N/a	
(Brazil) Hyundai N Team Scuderia Chiarelli	Hyundai Elantra N TCR	43	(Brazil) Pedro Cardoso	B	All	(Brazil) Mathias de Valle	3–4
(Brazil) / W2 Shell V-Power (Note: Car No. 28 entered as "W2 Shell V-Power". Car No. 77 entered as "W2 ProGP".); (Brazil) / W2 ProGP	CUPRA León Competición TCR	28	(Brazil) Galid Osman	B	All	(Brazil) Felipe Lapenna	3–4
(Brazil) / W2 Shell V-Power; (Brazil) / W2 ProGP	CUPRA León Competición TCR	77	(Brazil) Raphael Reis	B	All	(Argentina) Jorge Barrio	3–4
(Argentina) Bratton Tito Bessone Team	Toyota GR Corolla Sport TCR	86	(Argentina) Esteban Guerrieri		6–7	—N/a	
(Italy) BRC Hyundai N Squadra Corse	Hyundai Elantra N TCR	105	(Hungary) Norbert Michelisz	W	6–7	—N/a	
(Italy) BRC Hyundai N Squadra Corse	Hyundai Elantra N TCR	196	(Spain) Mikel Azcona	W	6–7	—N/a	
(Sweden) Cyan Racing Lynk & Co	Lynk & Co 03 FL TCR	111	(Sweden) Thed Björk	W	6–7	—N/a	
(Sweden) Cyan Racing Lynk & Co	Lynk & Co 03 FL TCR	112	(Uruguay) Santiago Urrutia	W	6–7	—N/a	
(Sweden) Cyan Racing Lynk & Co	Lynk & Co 03 FL TCR	155	(China) Ma Qing Hua	W	6–7	—N/a	
(Sweden) Cyan Racing Lynk & Co	Lynk & Co 03 FL TCR	168	(France) Yann Ehrlacher	W	6–7	—N/a	
(Belgium) Audi Sport Team Comtoyou	Audi RS 3 LMS TCR (2021)	122	(Belgium) Frédéric Vervisch	W	6–7	—N/a	
(Belgium) Audi Sport Team Comtoyou	Audi RS 3 LMS TCR (2021)	179	(United Kingdom) Robert Huff	W	6–7	—N/a	

Icon	Class
T	Eligible for TCR Trophy
B	Eligible for TCR Brazil
W	Eligible for TCR World Tour

== Results and standings ==
=== Season summary ===
Rnd.		Circuit	Pole position	Fastest lap	Winning driver	Winning team	Winning Trophy driver
1	R1	(Argentina) Alta Gracia	(Brazil) Raphael Reis	(Brazil) Raphael Reis	(Argentina) Ignacio Montenegro	(Argentina) Squadra Martino	(Uruguay) Enrique Maglione
1	R2	(Argentina) Alta Gracia		(Argentina) Juan Ángel Rosso	(Argentina) Walter Hernández	(Argentina) PMO Motorsport	(Argentina) Pablo Otero
2	R3	(Argentina) Rosario	(Argentina) Juan Ángel Rosso	(Brazil) Galid Osman	(Argentina) Ignacio Montenegro	(Argentina) Squadra Martino	(Brazil) Fabio Casagrande
2	R4	(Argentina) Rosario		(Brazil) Raphael Reis	(Argentina) Ignacio Montenegro	(Argentina) Squadra Martino	(Brazil) Fabio Casagrande
3	R5	(Argentina) Termas de Río Hondo	(Brazil) Raphael Reis (Argentina) Jorge Barrio	(Brazil) Raphael Reis (Argentina) Jorge Barrio	(Brazil) Raphael Reis (Argentina) Jorge Barrio	(Brazil) W2 ProGP	(Uruguay) Enrique Maglione (Uruguay) Rodrigo Aramendía
4	R6	(Brazil) Interlagos	(Argentina) Ignacio Montenegro (Argentina) Lucas Colombo Russell	(Brazil) Guilherme Reischl (Brazil) Guilherme Salas	(Brazil) Galid Osman (Brazil) Felipe Lapenna	(Brazil) W2 ProGP	(Brazil) Adalberto Baptista (Brazil) Rodrigo Baptista
5	R7	(Uruguay) Rivera	(Argentina) Ignacio Montenegro	(Uruguay) Juan Manuel Casella	(Argentina) Ignacio Montenegro	(Argentina) Squadra Martino	(Brazil) Fabio Casagrande
5	R8	(Uruguay) Rivera		(Brazil) Rafael Suzuki	(Brazil) Rafael Suzuki	(Argentina) PMO Motorsport	(Uruguay) Enrique Maglione
6	R9	(Uruguay) El Pinar	(Uruguay) Juan Manuel Casella (Note: Actual pole position was taken by TCR World Tour driver Santiago Urrutia.)	(Argentina) Ignacio Montenegro (Note: Actual fastest lap of the race was taken by TCR World Tour driver Santiago Urrutia.)	(Argentina) Ignacio Montenegro (Note: Actual victory in the race was taken by TCR World Tour driver Santiago Urrutia.)	(Argentina) Squadra Martino (Note: Actual victory in the race was taken by TCR World Tour team BRC Hyundai N Squadra Corse.)	(Brazil) Fabio Casagrande
6	R10	(Uruguay) El Pinar		(Argentina) Esteban Guerrieri (Note: Actual fastest lap of the race was taken by TCR World Tour driver Mikel Azcona.)	(Argentina) Esteban Guerrieri (Note: Actual pole position was taken by TCR World Tour driver Ma Qing Hua.)	(Argentina) Bratton Tito Bessone Team (Note: Actual victory in the race was taken by TCR World Tour team Cyan Racing Lynk & Co.)	(Brazil) Fabio Casagrande
7	R11	(Argentina) Villa Mercedes	(Brazil) Pedro Cardoso (Note: Actual pole position was taken by TCR World Tour driver Yann Ehrlacher.)	(Argentina) Fabián Yannantuoni (Note: Actual fastest lap of the race was taken by TCR World Tour driver Mikel Azcona.)	(Argentina) Fabián Yannantuoni (Note: Actual victory in the race was taken by TCR World Tour driver Mikel Azcona.)	(Argentina) Paladini Racing (Note: Actual victory in the race was taken by TCR World Tour team BRC Hyundai N Squadra Corse.)	(Brazil) Adalberto Baptista
7	R12	(Argentina) Villa Mercedes		(Argentina) Ignacio Montenegro (Note: Actual fastest lap of the race was taken by TCR World Tour driver Yann Ehrlacher.)	(Argentina) Bernardo Llaver (Note: Actual victory in the race was taken by TCR World Tour driver Nestor Girolami.)	Toyota Team Argentina (Note: Actual victory in the race was taken by TCR World Tour entry from team Squadra Martino.)	(Brazil) Adalberto Baptista
8	R13	(Brazil) Velopark	(Argentina) Ignacio Montenegro	(Brazil) Raphael Reis	(Argentina) Bernardo Llaver	Toyota Team Argentina	(Uruguay) Enrique Maglione
8	R14	(Brazil) Velopark		(Brazil) Diego Nunes	(Argentina) Fabián Yannantuoni	(Argentina) Paladini Racing	(Brazil) Adalberto Baptista
9	R15	(Brazil) Velo Città	(Brazil) Raphael Reis	(Brazil) Galid Osman	(Brazil) Raphael Reis	(Brazil) W2 ProGP	(Brazil) Marcos Regadas
9	R16	(Brazil) Velo Città		(Brazil) Raphael Reis	(Brazil) Galid Osman	(Brazil) W2 ProGP	(Brazil) Guilherme Reischl
10	R17	(Brazil) Cascavel	(Uruguay) Juan Manuel Casella	(Brazil) Rafael Suzuki	(Brazil) Rafael Suzuki	(Argentina) PMO Motorsport	(Brazil) Fabio Casagrande
10	R18	(Brazil) Cascavel		(Brazil) Diego Nunes	(Brazil) Diego Nunes	(Brazil) Cobra Racing Team	(Brazil) Marcio Basso

== Championship standings ==
Scoring system

Position	1st	2nd	3rd	4th	5th	6th	7th	8th	9th	10th	11th	12th	13th	14th	15th
Qualifying	10	7	5	4	3	2	1	—N/a							
Sprint Race 1 & Endurance	40	35	30	27	24	21	18	15	13	11	9	7	5	3	1
Sprint Race 2	35	30	27	24	21	18	15	13	11	9	7	5	3	2	1

=== Drivers' championship ===
Overall

Pos.	Driver	AGC (Argentina)		ROS (Argentina)		TER (Argentina)	INT (Brazil)	RIV (Uruguay)		ELP (Uruguay)		VLM (Argentina)		VLP (Brazil)		VEL (Brazil)		CAS (Brazil)		Pts.
Pos.	Driver	RD1	RD2	RD1	RD2	EDC	EDC	RD1	RD2	RD1	RD2	RD1	RD2	RD1	RD2	RD1	RD2	RD1	RD2	Pts.
1	(Argentina) Ignacio Montenegro	1^{3}	2	1^{3}	1	7^{6}	18^{1}†	1	6	10^{2}	Ret	9^{7}	14	2^{1}	8	4^{4}	Ret	7^{6}	8	468
2	(Argentina) Bernardo Llaver	4^{4}	5	3^{2}	4	3^{3}	Ret^{5}	4	2	14	16	8^{3}	7	1^{3}	5	7^{7}	4	3^{3}	4	452
3	(Brazil) Raphael Reis	2^{1}	Ret	6	7	1^{1}	2^{6}	5^{6}	6	Ret^{7}	15	Ret	8	9	4	1^{1}	12	6	6	392
4	(Argentina) Juan Ángel Rosso	Ret	13	7^{1}	5	20	4^{7}	Ret	10	13^{4}	11	7^{5}	Ret	4	2	2^{6}	3	4^{7}	2	370
5	(Brazil) Galid Osman	3^{2}	6	5^{5}	Ret	6	1^{2}	17^{5}	Ret	16^{5}	17	13	9	8	10	15†^{3}	1	2^{4}	5	356
6	(Brazil) Rafael Suzuki	5^{5}	3	8	DSQ	5^{4}	13	DSQ	1	15^{6}	12			3^{2}	9	9^{2}	7	1^{2}	7	331
7	(Uruguay) Juan Manuel Casella	8	9	2^{4}	2	4	3^{3}	10^{7}	4	11^{1}	13	16	13	5^{4}	11	10	10	DSQ^{1}	DNS	329
8	(Argentina) Fabián Yannantuoni	Ret^{7}	DSQ	11^{6}	6	19	5	Ret	9	Ret	20	5^{2}	Ret	6	1	5	Ret	5^{5}	3	253
9	(Brazil) Pedro Cardoso	DSQ	15	10	8	9	6	3^{3}	12	18	22	10^{1}	DSQ	Ret^{6}	12	3^{5}	2	9	Ret	233
10	(Argentina) José Manuel Sapag	9	7	9	3	Ret^{7}	17	11	Ret	19	21	15	12	10	3	8	5	15	9	212
11	(Brazil) Diego Nunes	DSQ	20	Ret	10	17	9	6	14	20	18	14^{6}	Ret	7	6	6	9	DSQ	1	183
12	(Uruguay) Frederick Balbi	10	Ret	12	Ret	14^{5}	10	16†	3	17	14	12	Ret							116
13	(Argentina) Esteban Guerrieri									12^{3}	10	11	10							115
14	(Argentina) Fabricio Pezzini	6^{6}	4	4	Ret	19†		8	11	21	19									112
15	(Argentina) Damián Fineschi					2^{2}		2^{2}	8	DNQ	DNQ									97
16	(Brazil) Fabio Casagrande	12	16	14^{7}	9	15	11	9	15	23	23	18	Ret	Ret	16	13	8	8	12	95
17	(Brazil) Adalberto Baptista	14	11	17	12	11	7	14	17	24	24	17	15	13	13	14	Ret	13	15	84
18	(Argentina) Jorge Barrio					1^{1}	2^{6}													87
19	(Brazil) Felipe Lapenna					6	1^{2}													68
20	(Uruguay) Enrique Maglione	11	17	15	Ret	10	16	DSQ	13	Ret	26†	Ret	Ret	12^{7}	14	Ret	11	12	11	58
21	(Argentina) Juan Pablo Bessone	DSQ	18	13	Ret	8	Ret		7^{4}	7										57
22	(Brazil) Guilherme Reischl	13	10			18	Ret^{4}	12	19					14	15	11	13	10	14	55
23	(Argentina) Walter Hernández	7	1																	53
24	(Argentina) Facundo Marques					2^{2}	Ret													42
25	(Argentina) Gastón Iansa					3^{3}	Ret^{5}													38
26	(Brazil) Gaetano di Mauro						3^{3}													35
27	(Brazil) Mathias de Valle					9	6													34
28	(Brazil) Marcio Basso						8											11	10	33
29	(Argentina) Matías Signorelli					5^{4}	14													33
30	(Argentina) Matías Milla					4						Ret^{4}	Ret							31
31	(Argentina) Lucas Colombo Russell					7^{6}	18^{1}†													30
32	(Argentina) Gonzalo Alterio	Ret	14	16	13	13	8													29
33	(Argentina) Luciano Farroni					20	4^{7}													28
34	(Brazil) Marcos Regadas						15									12	6			26
35	(Brazil) Beto Monteiro						5													24
36	(Argentina) Diego Gutiérrez	15	12	19	13	16	12	15	18									14	13	23
37	(Brazil) Bruno Baptista						7													18
38	(Argentina) Ever Franetovich					8														15
39	(Argentina) Pablo Otero	DSQ	8	18	Ret	Ret														13
40	(Brazil) Thiago Vivacqua						9													13
41	(Uruguay) Michel Bonnin					12		13	16	WD	WD									12
42	(Brazil) Nelson Marcondes						10													11
43	(Uruguay) Rodrigo Aramendía					10	16													11
44	(Argentina) Franco Coscia					15	11													10
45	(Brazil) Rodrigo Baptista					11														9
46	(Argentina) Franco Farina					12														7
47	(Argentina) Gustavo Fernigrini					16	12													7
48	(Argentina) Matías Russo					14														6
49	(Argentina) Carlos Javier Merlo					13														5
50	(Uruguay) Gonzalo Reilly									22	27†									5
51	(Brazil) Guilherme Salas						Ret^{4}													4
52	(Argentina) Claudio Rama						14													3
53	(Argentina) Leandro Rama					Ret	14													3
54	(Brazil) Lucas Salles						15													1
55	(Argentina) Marcelo Ciarrocchi					Ret^{7}	17													1
	(Brazil) Pedro Nunes					17														0
	(Argentina) Ernesto Bessone II					18														0
	(Uruguay) Carlos Silva									Ret	25									0
	(Brazil) Felipe Papazissis															DNS	DNS			
Drivers ineligible for championship points
	(China) Ma Qing Hua									9	1	4	2							
	(Spain) Mikel Azcona									8	2	1	Ret							
	(Argentina) Néstor Girolami									4	8	Ret	1							
	(Uruguay) Santiago Urrutia									1	6	Ret	11							
	(Hungary) Norbert Michelisz									6	7	2	4							
	(Sweden) Thed Björk									2	9	Ret	6							
	(United Kingdom) Robert Huff									7	4	3	3							
	(Belgium) Frédéric Vervisch									3	5	19†	5							
	(France) Yann Ehrlacher									5	3	6	16†							
	(Brazil) Fabiano Cardoso													11	7					
Pos.	Driver	AGC (Argentina)		ROS (Argentina)		TER (Argentina)	INT (Brazil)	RIV (Uruguay)		ELP (Uruguay)		VLM (Argentina)		VLP (Brazil)		VEL (Brazil)		CAS (Brazil)		Pts.

Colour	Result
Gold	Winner
Silver	Second place
Bronze	Third place
Green	Points classification
Blue	Non-points classification
Blue	Non-classified finish (NC)
Purple	Retired, not classified (Ret)
Red	Did not qualify (DNQ)
Red	Did not pre-qualify (DNPQ)
Black	Disqualified (DSQ)
White	Did not start (DNS)
White	Withdrew (WD)
White	Race cancelled (C)
Blank	Did not practice (DNP)
Blank	Did not arrive (DNA)
Blank	Excluded (EX)

^{1} ^{2} ^{3} ^{4} ^{5} ^{6} ^{7} – Points-scoring position in qualifying, not including World Tour entries

† – Drivers did not finish the race, but were classified as they completed over 75% of the race distance.

Trophy Cup

Pos.	Driver	AGC (Argentina)		ROS (Argentina)		TER (Argentina)	INT (Brazil)	RIV (Uruguay)		ELP (Uruguay)		VLM (Argentina)		VLP (Brazil)		VEL (Brazil)		CAS (Brazil)		Pts.
Pos.	Driver	RD1	RD2	RD1	RD2	EDC	EDC	RD1	RD2	RD1	RD2	RD1	RD2	RD1	RD2	RD1	RD2	RD1	RD2	Pts.
1	(Brazil) Fabio Casagrande	2	5	1	1	3^{4}	3	1^{2}	2	1^{2}	1	2^{2}	Ret	Ret^{2}	4	3^{1}	2	1^{1}	3	594
2	(Brazil) Adalberto Baptista	4	3	3	2	2^{2}	1^{3}	3^{7}	3	2^{4}	2	1^{3}	1	2^{3}	1	4^{4}	Ret	5^{5}	6†	572
3	(Uruguay) Enrique Maglione	1	6	2	Ret	1^{1}	7	DSQ^{1}	1	Ret^{1}	4†	Ret^{1}	Ret	1^{1}	2	Ret^{5}	3	4^{4}	2	421
4	(Brazil) Guilherme Reischl	3	2			5^{5}	Ret^{1}	2^{3}	5†					3^{4}	3	1^{2}	4†	2^{2}	5	353
5	(Argentina) Diego Gutiérrez	5	4	5	3	4	4^{7}	4^{4}	4†									6^{6}	4	261
6	(Brazil) Marcio Basso						2^{5}											3^{3}	1	108
7	(Argentina) Pablo Otero	DSQ	1	4	Ret	Ret^{3}														77
8	(Brazil) Marcos Regadas															2^{3}	1			75
9	(Argentina) Franco Coscia					3	3^{4}													64
10	(Argentina) Gustavo Fernigrini					4	4^{7}													55
11	(Uruguay) Carlos Silva									Ret^{3}	3									32
12	(Brazil) Lucas Salles						6^{2}													28
13	(Argentina) Ernesto Bessone II					5^{5}														27
14	(Argentina) Claudio Rama						5^{6}													26
Pos.	Driver	AGC (Argentina)		ROS (Argentina)		TER (Argentina)	INT (Brazil)	RIV (Uruguay)		ELP (Uruguay)		VLM (Argentina)		VLP (Brazil)		VEL (Brazil)		CAS (Brazil)		Pts.

Colour	Result
Gold	Winner
Silver	Second place
Bronze	Third place
Green	Points classification
Blue	Non-points classification
Blue	Non-classified finish (NC)
Purple	Retired, not classified (Ret)
Red	Did not qualify (DNQ)
Red	Did not pre-qualify (DNPQ)
Black	Disqualified (DSQ)
White	Did not start (DNS)
White	Withdrew (WD)
White	Race cancelled (C)
Blank	Did not practice (DNP)
Blank	Did not arrive (DNA)
Blank	Excluded (EX)

^{1} ^{2} ^{3} ^{4} ^{5} ^{6} ^{7} – Points-scoring position in qualifying.

† – Drivers did not finish the race, but were classified as they completed over 75% of the race distance.

=== Teams' championship ===
Best 2 (two) results from each team are counted for teams' championship.

Pos.	Team	AGC (Argentina)		ROS (Argentina)		TER (Argentina)	INT (Brazil)	RIV (Uruguay)		ELP (Uruguay)		VLM (Argentina)		VLP (Brazil)		VEL (Brazil)		BRS (Brazil)		Pts.
Pos.	Team	RD1	RD2	RD1	RD2	EDC	EDC	RD1	RD2	RD1	RD2	RD1	RD2	RD1	RD2	RD1	RD2	RD1	RD2	Pts.
1	(Argentina) Squadra Martino	1	2	1	1	4	3	1	4	1	4	4	6	2	8	4	10	7	8	824
1	(Argentina) Squadra Martino	8	9	2	2	7	18†	10	5	2	Ret	11	7	5	10	10	Ret	Ret	DNS	824
2	(Brazil) W2 Pro GP	2	6	5	7	1	1	5	6	7	6	8	2	8	4	1	1	2	5	748
2	(Brazil) W2 Pro GP	3	Ret	6	Ret	6	2	Ret	Ret	Ret	8	Ret	3	9	9	15†	12†	6	6	748
3	Toyota Team Argentina	4	5	3	3	3	17	4	2	5	7	3	1	1	3	7	4	3	4	697
3	Toyota Team Argentina	9	7	9	4	Ret	Ret	11	Ret	10	12	10	5	10	5	8	5	15	9	697
4	(Argentina) Paladini Racing	Ret	13†	7	5	19	4	Ret	9	4	2	1	Ret	4	1	2	3	4	2	623
4	(Argentina) Paladini Racing	Ret	DSQ	11	6	20†	5	Ret	10	Ret	11	2	Ret	6	2	5	Ret	5	3	623
5	(Argentina) PMO Motorsport	5	1	4	Ret	5	10	16†	1	6	3	7	Ret	3	7	9	6	1	7	543
5	(Argentina) PMO Motorsport	7	3	8	DSQ	14	13	DSQ	3	8	5	Ret	Ret			12	7			543
6	(Brazil) Cobra Racing Team	14	10	17	10	11	7	6	14	9	11	9	8	7	6	6	9	13	1	273
6	(Brazil) Cobra Racing Team	DSQ	Ret	Ret	12	17	9	14	17	15	15	12	Ret	12	12	14	Ret	Ret	15†	273
7	(Argentina) PMO Racing	13	8	13	Ret	2	15†	2	7	13	18†			13	14	11	13†	10	10	238
7	(Argentina) PMO Racing	DSQ	11	18	Ret	8	Ret	7	8	WD	WD							11	14	238
8	(Brazil) Scuderia Chiarelli	DSQ	15†	10	8	9	6	3	12	9	13	5	DSQ	Ret	11	3	2	9	Ret	234
9	(Argentina) Bratton Tito Bessone Team									3	1	6	4							115
10	(Uruguay) Alfa Racing	Ret	14	16	11	13		13	16	Ret	16									19
10	(Uruguay) Alfa Racing									WD	WD									19
Pos.	Team	AGC (Argentina)		ROS (Argentina)		TER (Argentina)	INT (Brazil)	RIV (Uruguay)		ELP (Uruguay)		VLM (Argentina)		VLP (Brazil)		VEL (Brazil)		BRS (Brazil)		Pts.

Colour	Result
Gold	Winner
Silver	Second place
Bronze	Third place
Green	Points classification
Blue	Non-points classification
Blue	Non-classified finish (NC)
Purple	Retired, not classified (Ret)
Red	Did not qualify (DNQ)
Red	Did not pre-qualify (DNPQ)
Black	Disqualified (DSQ)
White	Did not start (DNS)
White	Withdrew (WD)
White	Race cancelled (C)
Blank	Did not practice (DNP)
Blank	Did not arrive (DNA)
Blank	Excluded (EX)

^{1} ^{2} ^{3} ^{4} ^{5} ^{6} ^{7} – Points-scoring position in qualifying, not including World Tour entries
