= Robin tom Rink =

German singer-songwriter and poet

Robin tom Rink (born 19 January 1982) is a German singer-songwriter and poet from Münster.

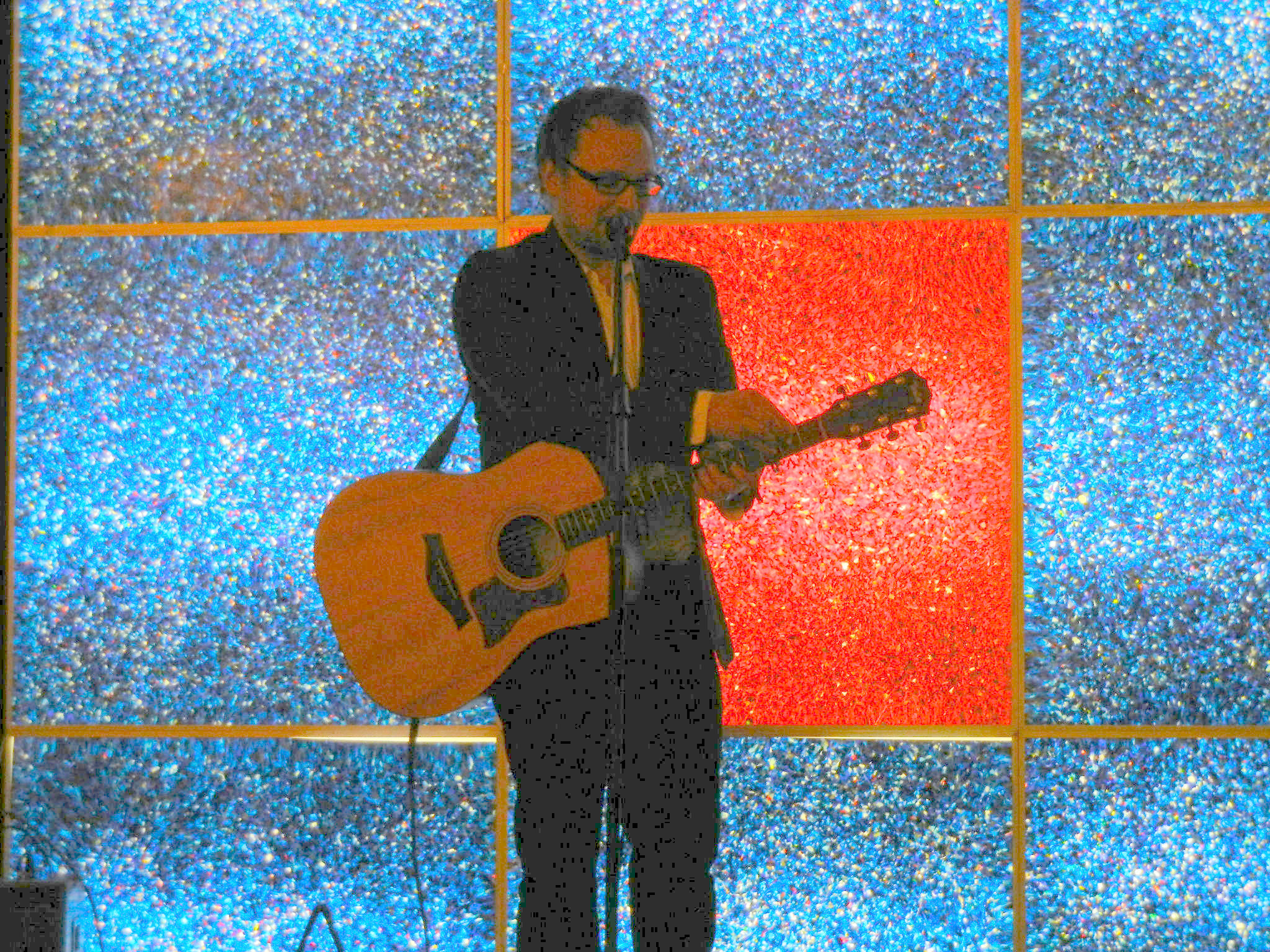
Robin tom Rink live in Cologne 2012

== History ==
In 2007 he moved from Berlin to Paris where he wrote his first album The Dilettante. He toured and played concerts with Heather Nova, Scott Matthew, Chris Wollard of Hot Water Music, Drag the River, Eleni Mandell and Nigel Harrison of Blondie. In 2010 he was invited to the Eurosonic Noorderslag.

Robin tom Rink also writes songs and lyrics for other bands. He wrote the lyrics for the album Planet, Planet. by the band Elyjah; The cover artwork by Zwölf agency won the Gold award at the European Design Award 2010 and the Silver Cube at the 89th Art Directors Club Awards New York.

The album The Small Hours was released in 2017. The Rolling Stone wrote about "songs of graceful peace".

In 2019 he was invited by the Cité internationale des arts to play in Paris.

The album I'm afraid of shards was released in December 2024 by poly unique records.

His poems and lyrics were released by Edition Yara from Vienna.

He is married and lives in Cologne.

== Discography ==
- The Dilettante (2009, Cargo Records)
- Planet Planet (2009, Cargo Records) with Elyjah
- Thoughts from the Lighthouse (2010, Cargo Records)
- The Shorelines-Live (2012)
- The Small Hours (2017, Indigo Records)
- I'm afraid of shards (2024, poly unique records)

== Books ==
- Lyrics Edition Yara; Vienna
- Waldmeder-Ein Gedicht Edition Yara; Vienna

== Compilations ==
- New Noises 95 (Rolling Stone)
- All Areas 105 (Visions Magazine)
