= Esteban Guerrieri =

Argentine racing driver

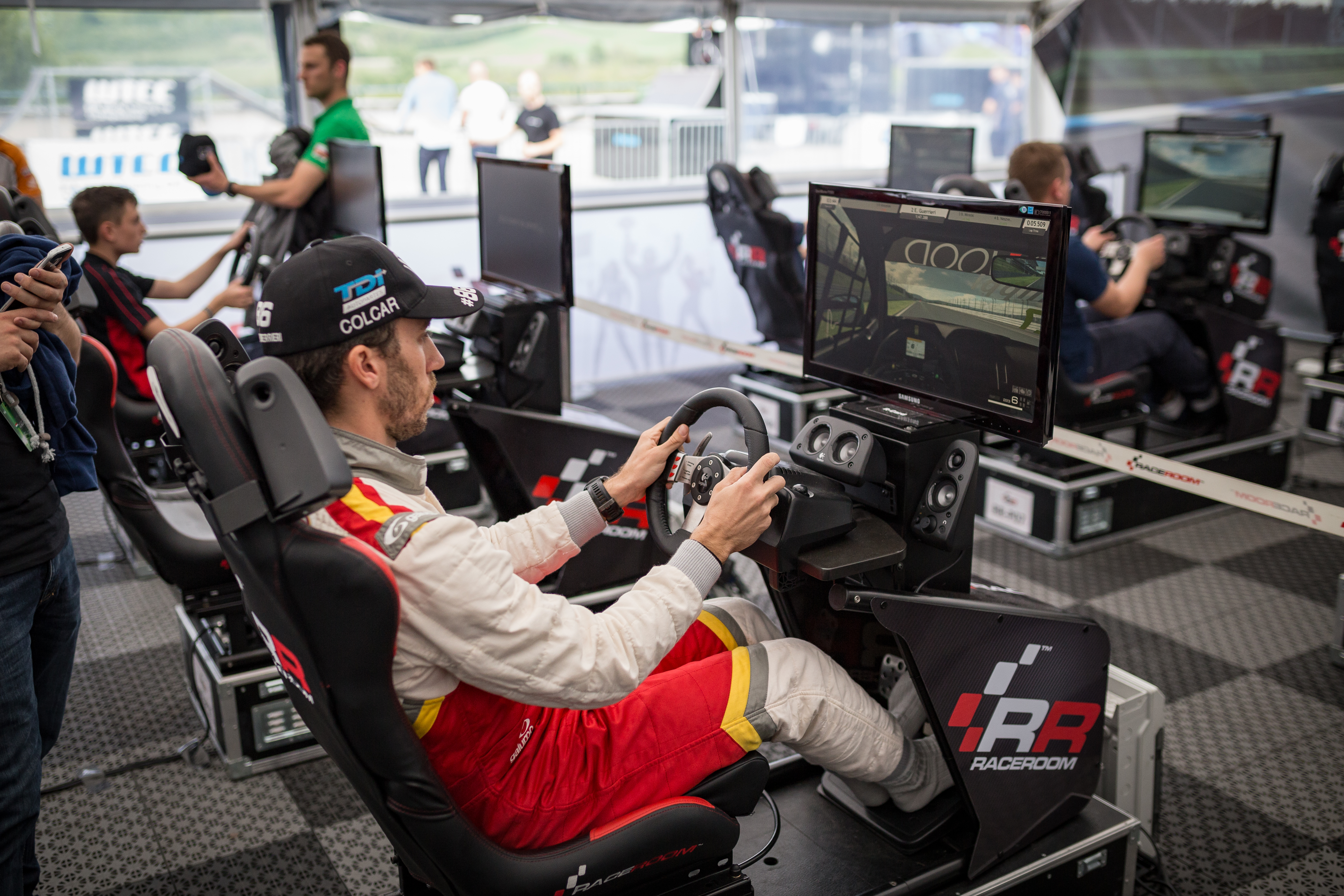
- Guerrieri in 2017
- Nationality: (Argentina) Argentine
- Born: 19 January 1985 (age 41) Buenos Aires, Argentina

World Touring Car Championship, World Touring Car Cup and TCR World Tour career
- Debut season: 2016
- Current team: GOAT Racing
- Categorisation: FIA Gold (until 2019, 2027–); FIA Platinum (2020–2026)
- Car number: 86
- Wins: 10
- Podiums: 22
- Poles: 3
- Fastest laps: 8
- Best finish: 2nd in 2019

Previous series
- 2011–12 2007–10 2009 2009–11 2007–08 2005–07 2004 2004 2003 2002–03 2001–03 2000: Indy Lights; Formula Renault 3.5 Series; Superleague Formula; TC 2000; British Formula 3 Formula 3 Euro Series; International Formula 3000; Formula Renault V6 Eurocup; Formula Renault 2000 Italia; FR2000 Germany; FR2000 Eurocup/Masters; Argentino de FSuper Renault

Championship titles
- 2003 2000: FR2000 Masters; Argentino de FSuper Renault

Esteban Guerrieri (born 19 January 1985) is an Argentine racing driver currently competing in the FIA TCR World Tour for the GOAT Racing Honda team. His early career in single-seaters saw him become Formula Renault Eurocup champion in 2003, finish third in Formula Renault 3.5 in 2010, and claim the runner-up spot in Indy Lights in 2011 and 2012. In the WTCR touring car series, he was the most successful driver in terms of race wins and was overall runner-up in 2019. He also won the Nürburgring 24 Hours in the TCR class in 2020.

== Early career ==
=== Formula racing ===
After graduating from karts, Guerrieri competed in various Formula Renault 2000 championships from 2001 to 2003. He won the Formula Renault 2000 Masters series in 2003, with 124 points and three wins from eight races in total.

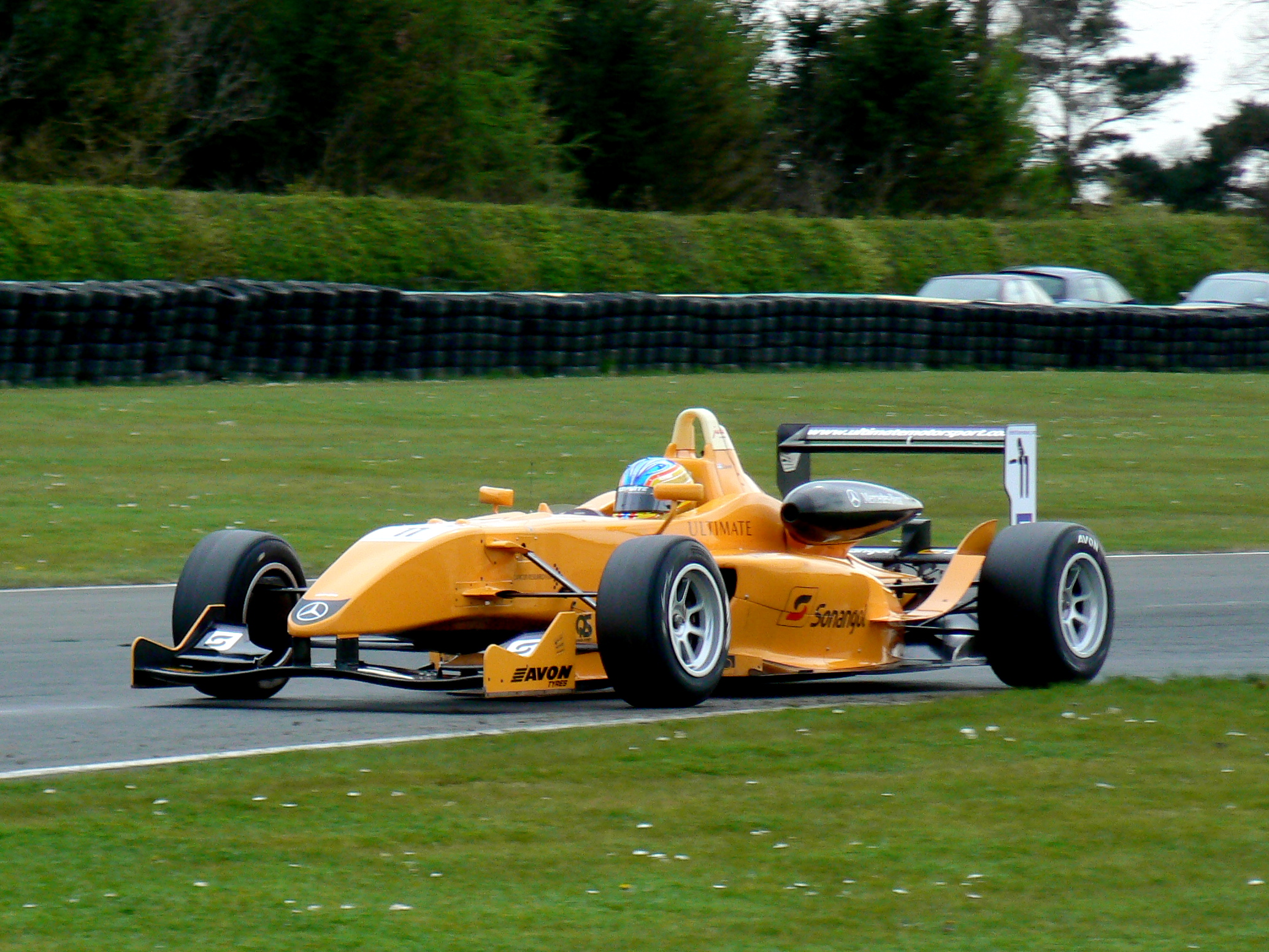
Guerrieri driving for Ultimate Motorsport at the Croft round of the 2008 British Formula 3 season.

For 2004, Guerrieri took the large step up to Formula 3000, driving for BCN Competición. He performed well in his début year, finishing tied on 28 points in seventh place with compatriot and fellow rookie José María López. His best result came at the Hockenheim round of the season, where he finished in third place.

Despite this impressive showing, Guerrieri was unable to get a drive when F3000 changed into the GP2 Series for 2005, and spent that year and 2006 in the Formula 3 Euro Series, both seasons with Manor Motorsport. He finished fourth in the standings, with 58 points, two wins and two pole positions.

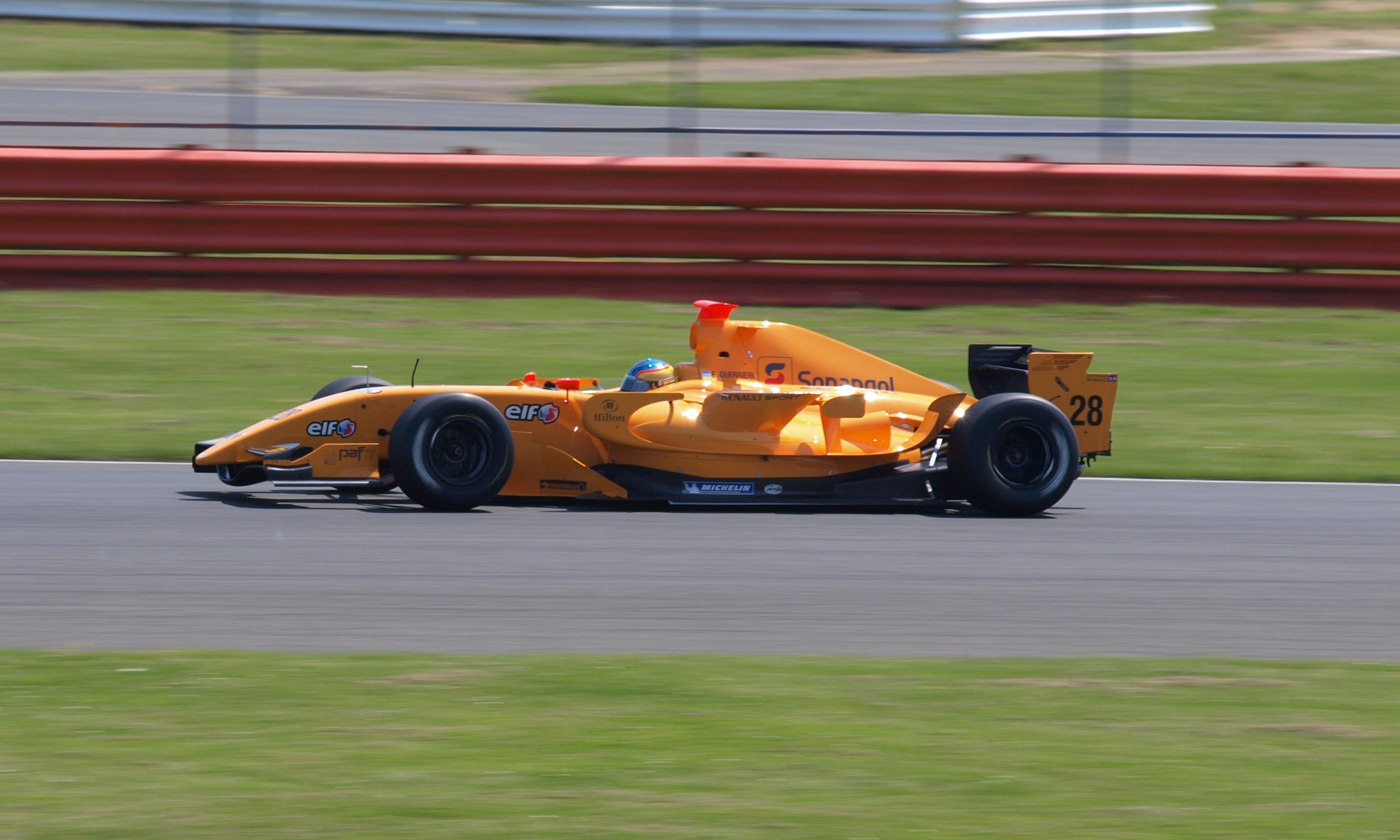
Guerrieri driving at Silverstone during the 2008 Formula Renault 3.5 Series.

He competed in British Formula 3 for 2007 with Ultimate Motorsport Team finishing thirteenth overall in the final standings. Returning for 2008, he achieved the best result for him and his team with a second place on Monza, the third race of the year. After that race, he moved to the Formula Renault 3.5 Series. He took his first FR3.5 win in the final race of the season. He did however return to F3 at the Bucharest meeting taking a pair of fourth positions.

In 2009, Guerrieri drove for various teams in the Superleague Formula series, winning two races in the process. For 2010, he returned to Formula Renault 3.5 full-time, although budgetary concerns caused him to miss races.

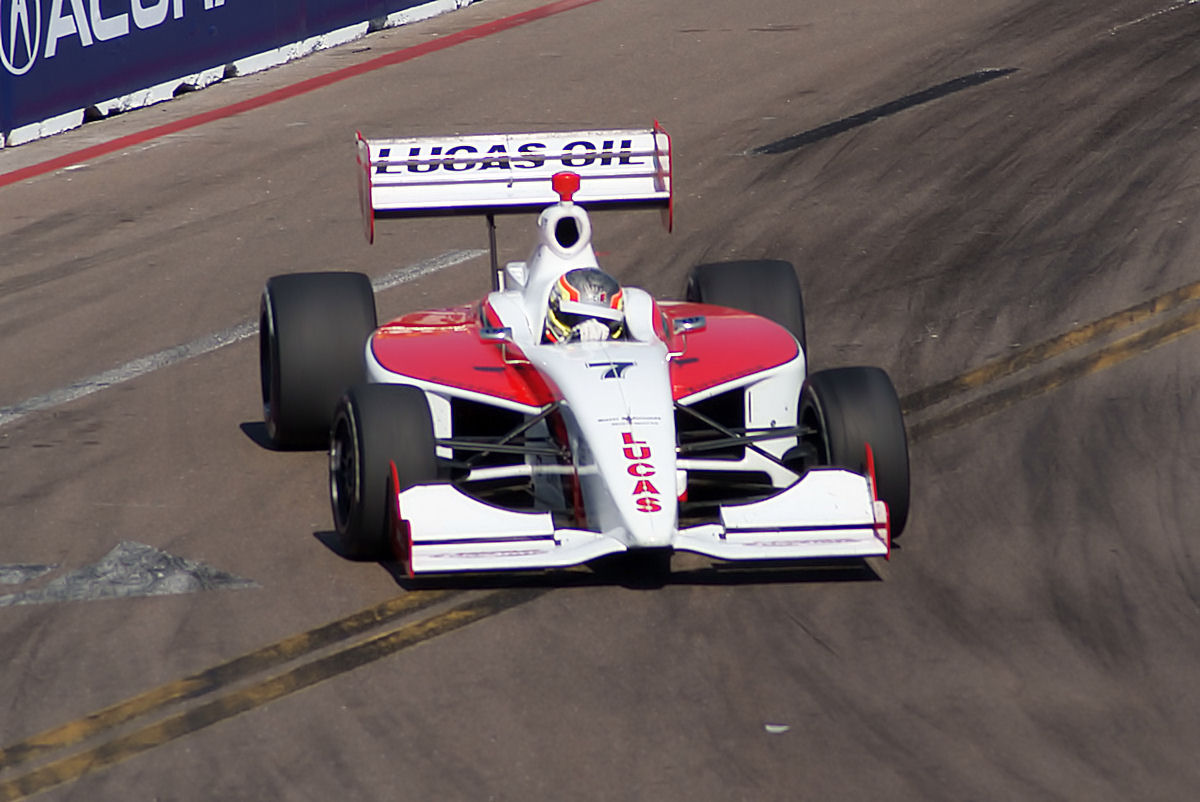
Guerrieri driving at the opening round of the 2011 Indy Lights season.

In August 2010, Guerrieri revealed that he had a priority contract with the Virgin Racing Formula One team for a 2011 race seat, providing that he could raise $8 million. Guerrieri's manager has held discussions with the Argentine Interior Minister on the subject of possible government funding. The Argentine government previously provided financial support to compatriot José María López's attempts to enter Formula One.

For 2011, Guerrieri went to the United States with the ultimate goal of racing in the IndyCar Series, starting with Indy Lights. During the 2011 Indy Lights season, Guerrieri drove for Sam Schmidt Motorsports. He finished the season runner-up to teammate Josef Newgarden with three wins. In 2012, he again finished second in the championship behind his teammate Tristan Vautier, taking three wins, including the Indianapolis 500 support race. Due to budget constraints, he moved back to Argentina for 2013.

== Touring car career ==
=== Argentina ===
In 2013, Guerrieri switched to the Argentinian touring car series Turismo Carretera to drive a Dodge for Oil Competición. He also raced in Top Race V6 for Midas Racing Team.

Having previously raced as a guest driver in various TC 2000 races between 2009 and 2011, winning the 200 km de Buenos Aires in 2011, Guerrieri joined the Toyota team for the 2014 Súper TC 2000 season. He finished 16th in the 2014 drivers' standings, before finishing eighth in 2015 with a single win, and then seventh with another victory in 2016. Guerrieri moved from Toyota to Citroën for the 2017 season, resulting 11th in the championship with one win.

=== World Touring Cars ===
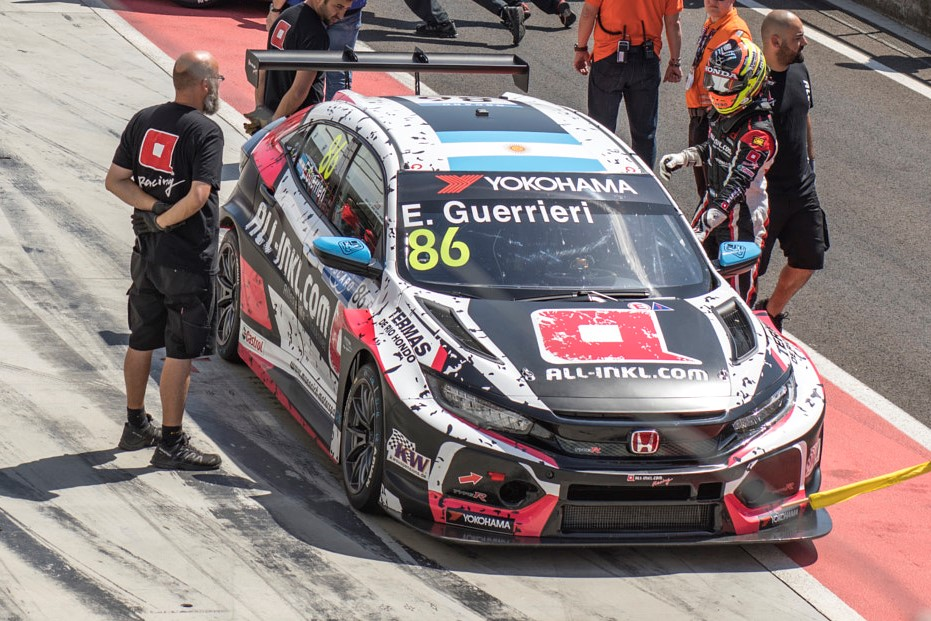
Guerrieri and his Honda at the 2018 WTCR Race of Hungary

In August 2016, Guerrieri got a chance from Campos Racing to compete in the Argentinian round of the World Touring Car Championship with a Chevrolet Cruze TC1 car. Guerrieri was successful on his first appearance as he finished the main race in sixth and scored the fastest lap of all during the weekend.

For the 2017 season, Guerrieri became a full-time driver at Campos Racing, driving the team's only car. During the first seven rounds, he won the opening races in Marrakech and China. With three rounds remaining in the season, the Honda factory squad signed him to replace the injured Tiago Monteiro. He then took pole position and main race victory in the final round at Qatar, ending up fourth in the drivers' standings.

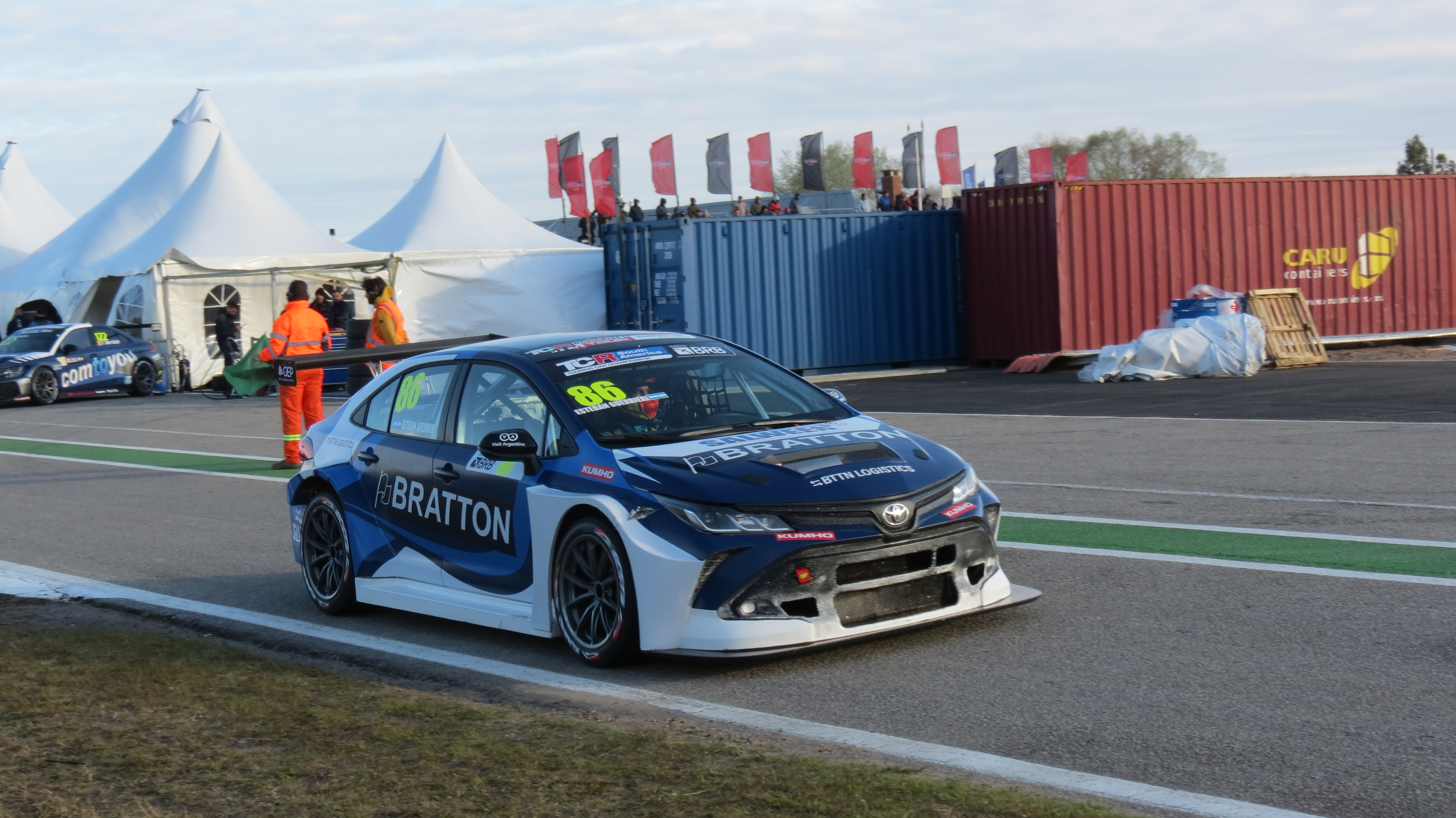
Guerrieri qualifying for the Uruguayan round of the 2023 TCR World Tour.

After the series became the World Touring Car Cup in 2018, Guerrieri remained at Honda, now with Münnich Motorsport running the cars. In 2018 he won at Nürburgring and Macau to place third in the standings. For the following season, he took four wins to finish as championship runner-up; he was recognised by TouringCarTimes as the best driver of the WTCR season. Guerrieri won four times again in 2020, breaking the record for most wins in WTCR, and finished fourth in the drivers' cup. He scored five podiums, although no wins, across the 2021 and 2022 seasons, finishing them sixth and eighth overall respectively. No driver managed to match or surpass Guerrieri's tally of ten wins, and as the WTCR ended after 2022, Guerrieri became the series' most successful driver in terms of victories.

Guerrieri joined the FIA TCR World Tour in 2024 with the GOAT Racing Honda team.

== Hypercar career ==
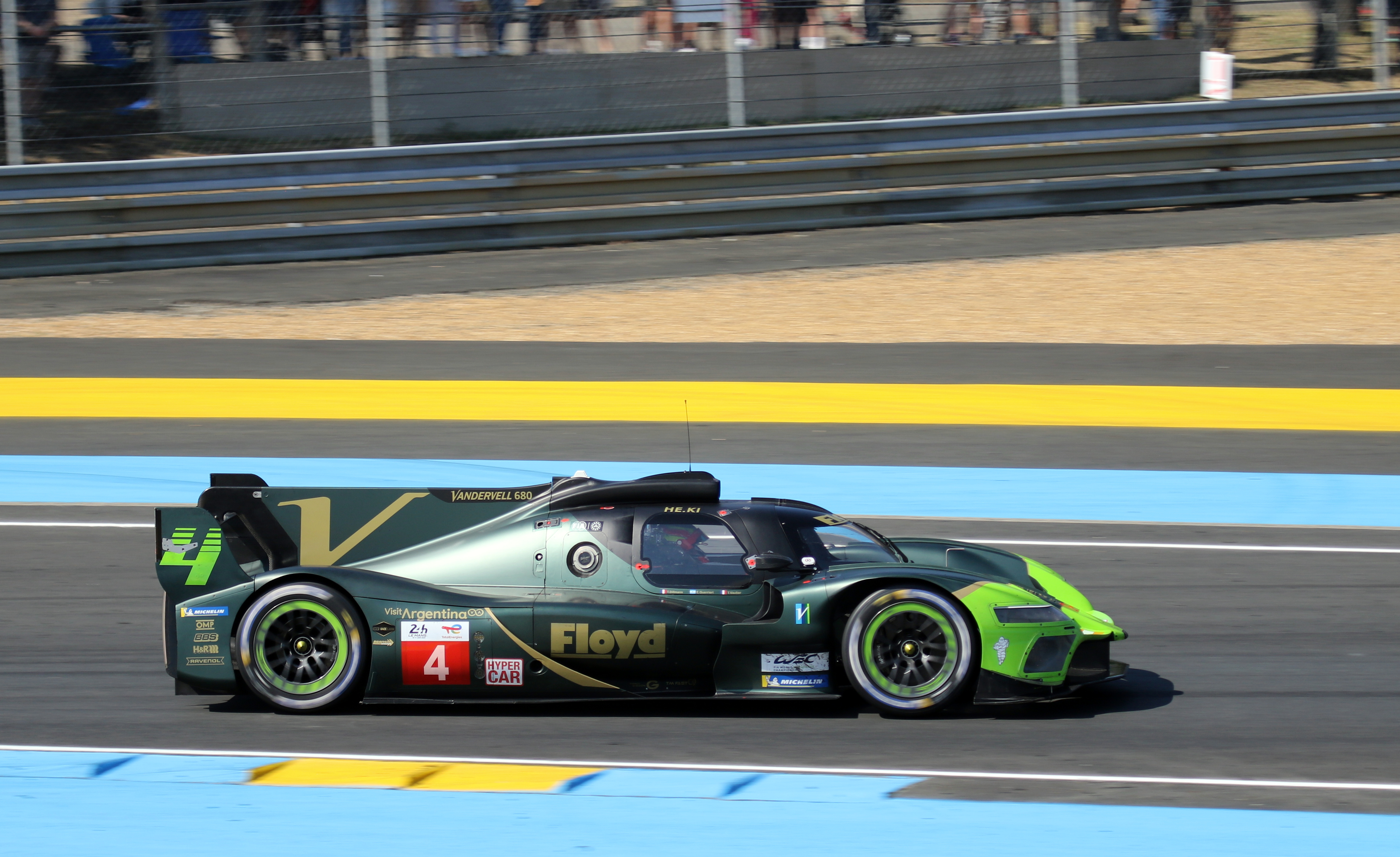
Guerrieri driving at the 2023 24 Hours of Le Mans.

For 2023, Guerrieri would move to the Floyd Vanwall Racing Team in the World Endurance Championship, driving a Vanwall Vandervell 680 alongside Tom Dillmann and Jacques Villeneuve. The team's best and only points finish of eighth being at the opening round. Guerrieri had a spin during the 6 Hours of Spa-Francorchamps before Villeneuve crashed out. Guerrieri failed to finish his debut 24 Hours of Le Mans as the Vanwall's engine failed on lap 165, the team having been hampered with power and suspension issues up to that point. Guerrieri was the only Vanwall driver to compete at every round and finished the season in 16th place. With the Vanwall team's failure to gain entry to the 2024 season, Guerrieri returned to touring cars.

== Racing record ==
=== Career summary ===
Season	Series	Team	Races	Wins	Poles	F/Laps	Podiums	Points	Position
2000	Formula Renault Argentina	?	12	2	3	1	6	115	**1st**
2001	Formula Renault 2000 Eurocup	Lucidi Motorsport	10	0	0	0	1	54	10th
2002	Formula Renault 2000 Germany	Jenzer Motorsport	14	4	1	0	6	222	**3rd**
2002	Formula Renault 2000 Eurocup	Jenzer Motorsport	2	0	0	0	0	2	27th
2003	Formula Renault 2.0 Italia	Cram Competition	12	4	2	0	7	217	**2nd**
2003	Formula Renault 2000 Masters	Cram Competition	8	3	2	3	4	124	**1st**
2003	Formula Renault 2.0 Germany	Cram Competition	2	0	0	0	0	30	25th
2004	Formula 3000 International	BCN Competición	10	0	0	0	1	28	7th
2004	Formula Renault V6 Eurocup	Cram Competition	2	0	0	0	0	2	26th
2005	Formula 3 Euro Series	Team Midland Euroseries	20	0	0	1	0	12	16th
2005	Masters of Formula 3	Team Midland Euroseries	1	0	0	0	0	N/A	NC
2006	Formula 3 Euro Series	Manor Motorsport	19	2	2	1	6	58	4th
2006	Masters of Formula 3	Manor Motorsport	1	0	0	0	0	N/A	21st
2007	British Formula 3	Ultimate Motorsport	22	0	0	0	0	46	13th
2007	Formula 3 Euro Series	Ultimate Motorsport	2	0	0	0	0	0	NC
2007	Masters of Formula 3	Ultimate Motorsport	1	0	0	0	0	0	18th
2007	Formula Renault 3.5 Series	Fortec Motorsport	2	0	0	0	0	0	NC
2007	Macau Grand Prix	Signature Plus	1	0	0	0	0	N/A	15th
2008	Formula Renault 3.5 Series	Ultimate Signature	12	1	2	0	2	62	8th
2008	British Formula 3	Ultimate Motorsport	8	0	0	2	2	63	12th
2009	Superleague Formula	Al Ain	2	1	0	0	1	135†	19th†
2009	Superleague Formula	Sevilla FC	2	0	0	0	0	253†	9th†
2009	Superleague Formula	Olympiacos CFP	6	1	1	1	2	300†	6th†
2009	Formula Renault 3.5 Series	RC Motorsport	2	0	0	0	0	15	19th
2009	TC 2000	Renault Lo Jack Team	3	0	0	0	0	0	NC
2010	Formula Renault 3.5 Series	ISR Racing	14	6	3	4	8	123	**3rd**
2010	Auto GP	Charouz-Gravity Racing	2	0	0	0	0	5	18th
2010	TC 2000	Toyota Team Argentina	1	0	1	1	1	0	NC
2011	Firestone Indy Lights	Sam Schmidt Motorsports	14	3	6	3	6	459	**2nd**
2011	TC 2000	Toyota Team Argentina	1	1	1	1	1	0	NC
2012	Firestone Indy Lights	Sam Schmidt Motorsports	12	3	0	1	9	453	**2nd**
2013	Top Race	Midas Racing Team	11	0	0	0	1	?	10th
2013	Turismo Carretera	Oil Competición	14	0	0	0	0	181	32nd
2014	Top Race	Guido Guidi Competición	2	0	0	0	0	0	-
2014	Master de Pilotos	-	1	0	-	-	-	0	5th
2014	TC Mouras	-	1	0	0	0	0	0	0
2014	Súper TC 2000	Toyota Team Argentina	13	0	1	0	1	66	16th
2015	Súper TC 2000	Toyota Team Argentina	12	3	0	2	9	453	**2nd**
2016	TC 2000	Escudería Río de la Plata	1	0	0	0	0	0	NC
2016	World Touring Car Championship	Campos Racing	2	0	0	0	0	9	18th
2016	Súper TC 2000	Toyota Team Argentina	14	1	0	0	2	111.5	7th
2016	Turismo Carretera	Donto Racing	1	1	0	0	1	0	NC‡
2017	Súper TC 2000	Citroën Total Racing Team	20	1	0	0	2	96.50	11th
2017	World Touring Car Championship	Campos Racing	14	2	0	3	3	241	4th
2017	World Touring Car Championship	Castrol Honda World Touring Car Team	6	1	1	1	2	241	4th
2018	World Touring Car Cup	ALL-INKL.COM Münnich Motorsport	30	2	0	1	6	267	**3rd**
2018	Stock Car Brasil	HERO Motorsport II	4	0	0	0	0	13	29th
2018	International GT Open	Honda Racing Team JAS	1	0	0	0	0	9	26th
2019	World Touring Car Cup	ALL-INKL.COM Münnich Motorsport	30	4	3	3	10	349	**2nd**
2020	World Touring Car Cup	ALL-INKL.COM Münnich Motorsport	16	4	2	0	5	188	4th
2020	24 Hours of Nürburgring - TCR	Team Castrol Honda Racing	1	1	0	0	1	N/A	**1st**
2021	World Touring Car Cup	ALL-INKL.COM Münnich Motorsport	15	0	1	0	3	164	6th
2021	TCR South America Touring Car Championship	Squadra Martino	2	0	1	0	1	41	19th
2022	World Touring Car Cup	ALL-INKL.COM Münnich Motorsport	16	0	0	1	2	149	7th
2022	TCR South America Touring Car Championship	Squadra Martino	1	1	0	0	1	76	19th
2023	FIA World Endurance Championship - Hypercar	Floyd Vanwall Racing Team	7	0	0	0	0	6	16th
2023	24 Hours of Le Mans - Hypercar	Floyd Vanwall Racing Team	1	0	0	0	0	N/A	DNF
2023	TCR South America Touring Car Championship	Bratton Tito Bessone Team	4	1	0	1	2	115	13th
2023	TCR World Tour	Bratton Tito Bessone Team	4	0	0	0	0	26	21st
2024	TCR World Tour	GOAT Racing	14	1	0	1	7	291	4th
2024	TCR Italy Touring Car Championship	GOAT Racing	2	0	0	1	1	0	NC‡
2024	TCR South America Touring Car Championship	GOAT Racing	4	1	0	1	2	186	11th
2025	TCR World Tour	GOAT Racing	20	2	1	2	6	385	**3rd**
2025	TCR Australia Touring Car Series	GOAT Racing	4	0	0	0	1	0	NC‡
2026	TCR South America Touring Car Championship	Honda YPF Racing							
2026	TCR World Tour	GOAT Racing	2	0	0	0	0	28	18th*

† – Team standings. ‡ As he was a guest driver, Guerrieri was ineligible to score points. ^{*} Season still in progress.

=== Complete International Formula 3000 results ===
(key) (Races in bold indicate pole position; races in italics indicate fastest lap.)

Year	Entrant	1	2	3	4	5	6	7	8	9	10	DC	Points
2004	BCN F3000	IMO; Ret	CAT; 5	MON; Ret	NUR; 4	MAG; 6	SIL; 15	HOC; 3	HUN; 5	SPA; 7	MNZ; 5	7th	28

=== Complete Formula 3 Euro Series results ===
(key) (Races in bold indicate pole position) (Races in italics indicate fastest lap)

Year	Entrant	Chassis	Engine	1	2	3	4	5	6	7	8	9	10	11	12	13	14	15	16	17	18	19	20	DC	Points
2005	Team Midland Euroseries	Dallara F305/034	Toyota	HOC; 1 Ret	HOC; 2; 6	PAU; 1; 19	PAU; 2; 9	SPA; 1; 7	SPA; 2; 15	MON; 1; 17	MON; 2; 10	OSC; 1; 11	OSC; 2; 7	NOR; 1; 11	NOR; 2; 9	NÜR; 1; 14	NÜR; 2; 12	ZAN; 1; 6	ZAN; 2; 12	LAU; 1; 16	LAU; 2; 10	HOC; 1; 7	HOC; 2; 17	16th	12
2006	Manor Motorsport	Dallara F305/020	Mercedes	**HOC**; **1**; 14	HOC; 2; 3	LAU; 1; 1	LAU; 2; 5	**OSC**; **1**; 2	OSC; 2; 3	BRH; 1; 16	BRH; 2; 12	NOR; 1; 10	NOR; 2 DNS	NÜR; 1 Ret	NÜR; 2; 5	ZAN; 1; 8	ZAN; 2; 4	CAT; 1; 3	CAT; 2; 7	LMS; 1; 6	LMS; 2; 8	HOC; 1; 1	HOC; 2; 4	4th	58
2007	Ultimate Motorsport	Mygale M07/002	Mercedes	HOC; 1	HOC; 2	BRH; 1	BRH; 2	NOR; 1	NOR; 2	MAG; 1; 15	MAG; 2; 5	MUG; 1	MUG; 2	ZAN; 1	ZAN; 2	NÜR; 1	NÜR; 2	CAT; 1	CAT; 2	NOG; 1	NOG; 2	HOC; 1	HOC; 2	NC†	0†

^{†} As Guerrieri was a guest driver, he was ineligible for championship points.

=== Complete Formula Renault 3.5 Series results ===
(key) (Races in bold indicate pole position) (Races in italics indicate fastest lap)

Year	Team	1	2	3	4	5	6	7	8	9	10	11	12	13	14	15	16	17	Pos	Points
2007	Fortec Motorsport	MOZ; 1	MOZ; 2	NÜR; 1	NÜR; 2	MON; 1	HUN; 1	HUN; 2	SPA; 1	SPA; 2	DON; 1	DON; 2	MAG; 1 Ret	MAG; 2; 21	EST; 1	EST; 2	CAT; 1	CAT; 2	39th	0
2008	Ultimate Signature	MOZ; 1	MOZ; 2	SPA; 1	SPA; 2	MON; 1	SIL; 1; 22	SIL; 2; 4	HUN; 1 Ret	HUN; 2; 12	NÜR; 1; 12	NÜR; 2; 9	LEM; 1; 4	**LEM**; **2**; 3	EST; 1; 5	EST; 2; 6	CAT; 1 Ret	**CAT**; **2**; 1	8th	62
2009	RC Motorsport	CAT; 1	CAT; 2	SPA; 1	SPA; 2	MON; 1	HUN; 1	HUN; 2	SIL; 1	SIL; 2	LEM; 1	LEM; 2	ALG; 1	ALG; 2	NÜR; 1	NÜR; 2	ALC; 1; 5	ALC; 2; 4	19th	15
2010	ISR Racing	ALC; 1 Ret	ALC; 2 Ret	SPA; 1 DNS	SPA; 2; 1	MON; 1	BRN; 1; 1	BRN; 2; 1	**MAG**; **1**; 2	MAG; 2; 10	HUN; 1	HUN; 2	HOC; 1; 2	**HOC**; **2**; 1	SIL; 1 DSQ	SIL; 2; 1	CAT; 1; 4	**CAT**; **2**; 1	3rd	123

=== Superleague Formula ===
Year	Team	1	2	3	4	5	6	7	8	9	10	11	12	Rank	Pts	Ref
2009	Al Ain Ultimate Motorsport	MAG	MAG	ZOL; 6	ZOL; 1									19th	135	
2009	Sevilla FC Ultimate Motorsport					DON; 11	DON; 13							9th	253	
2009	Olympiacos CFP GU-Racing International							EST; 1	EST; 14	**MNZ**; 2	MNZ; 4	JAR; 8	JAR; 10	6th	300	

==== Super Final Results ====
Year	Team	1	2	3	4	5	6	Ref
2009	Al Ain Ultimate Motorsport	MAG	ZOL; N/A					
2009	Sevilla FC Ultimate Motorsport			DON; DNQ				
2009	Olympiacos CFP GU-Racing International				EST; 2	MNZ; N/A	JAR; DNQ	

==== 2010 ====
(key) (Races in bold indicate pole position) (Races in italics indicate fastest lap)

Year	Team	Operator	1	2	3	4	5	6	7	8	9	10	11	12			Position	Points	Ref
2010	PSV Eindhoven	Racing for Holland	SIL	ASS	MAG	JAR	NÜR	ZOL	BRH	ADR	POR	ORD	BEI	NAV			16th	288	
2010	PSV Eindhoven	Racing for Holland												11	2	3	16th	288	

=== American open–wheel racing results ===
(key)

==== Indy Lights ====
Year	Team	1	2	3	4	5	6	7	8	9	10	11	12	13	14	Rank	Points	Ref
2011	Sam Schmidt Motorsports	**STP**; 6	ALA; 15	**LBH**; 2	INDY; 2	**MIL**; 1	**IOW**; 12	**TOR**; 4	EDM1; 1	EDM2; 14	**TRO**; 1	NHM; 5	BAL; 12	KTY; 10	LVS; 2	2nd	459	
2012	Sam Schmidt Motorsports	STP; 2	ALA; 3	LBH; 1	INDY; 1	DET; 7	MIL; 3	IOW; 1	TOR; 6	EDM; 3	TRO; 4	BAL; 3	FON; 3			2nd	453	

=== Complete World Touring Car Championship results ===
(key) (Races in bold indicate pole position) (Races in italics indicate fastest lap)

Year	Team	Car	1	2	3	4	5	6	7	8	9	10	11	12	13	14	15	16	17	18	19	20	21	22	DC	Points
2016	Campos Racing	Chevrolet RML Cruze TC1	FRA; 1	FRA; 2	SVK; 1	SVK; 2	HUN; 1	HUN; 2	MAR; 1	MAR; 2	GER; 1	GER; 2	RUS; 1	RUS; 2	POR; 1	POR; 2	ARG; 1 Ret	ARG; 2; 6	JPN; 1	JPN; 2	CHN; 1	CHN; 2	QAT; 1	QAT; 2	17th	9
2017	Campos Racing	Chevrolet RML Cruze TC1	MAR; 1; 1	MAR; 2; 13	ITA; 1; 4	ITA; 2; 8	HUN; 1; 6	HUN; 2; 6	GER; 1; 5	GER; 2; 8	POR; 1 Ret	POR; 2; 8	ARG; 1; 3	ARG; 2; 4	CHN; 1; 1	CHN; 2; 4‡									4th	241
2017	Castrol Honda World Touring Car Team	Honda Civic WTCC															JPN; 1; 3	JPN; 2; 4	MAC; 1; 6	MAC; 2; 4	QAT; 1; 10	**QAT**; **2**; 1			4th	241

^{‡} Half points awarded as less than 75% of race distance was completed.

=== Complete World Touring Car Cup results ===
(key) (Races in bold indicate pole position) (Races in italics indicate fastest lap)

Year	Team	Car	1	2	3	4	5	6	7	8	9	10	11	12	13	14	15	16	17	18	19	20	21	22	23	24	25	26	27	28	29	30	DC	Points
2018	ALL-INKL.COM Münnich Motorsport	Honda Civic Type R TCR	MAR; 1; 6	MAR; 2; 8	MAR; 3; 14	HUN; 1; 2	HUN; 2; 5	HUN; 3; 22	GER; 1 Ret	GER; 2; 1	GER; 3; 8	NED; 1; 6	NED; 2; 7	NED; 3; 4	POR; 1; 2	POR; 2 Ret	POR; 3; 13	SVK; 1 Ret	SVK; 2; 8	SVK; 3 Ret	CHN; 1; 2	CHN; 2; 3	CHN; 3 Ret	WUH; 1; 7	WUH; 2; 13	WUH; 3; 4	JPN; 1; 4	JPN; 2 Ret	JPN; 3; 18	MAC; 1; 6	MAC; 2; 5	MAC; 3; 1	3rd	267
2019	ALL-INKL.COM Münnich Motorsport	Honda Civic Type R TCR	**MAR**; **1**; 1	MAR; 2; 4	MAR; 3; 4	HUN; 1; 3	HUN; 2; 5	HUN; 3 Ret	SVK; 1; 15	SVK; 2; 2	SVK; 3; 7	NED; 1; 11	NED; 2; 1	NED; 3; 8	**GER**; **1**; 2	GER; 2; 6	GER; 3; 3	POR; 1; 22	POR; 2; 3	POR; 3 Ret	CHN; 1; 19	CHN; 2 NC	CHN; 3 Ret	JPN; 1; 1	JPN; 2; 10	JPN; 3; 2	MAC; 1; 24†	MAC; 2; 4	MAC; 3; 10	MAL; 1; 4	MAL; 2; 1	MAL; 3; 22	2nd	349
2020	ALL-INKL.COM Münnich Motorsport	Honda Civic Type R TCR	BEL; 1 Ret	BEL; 2; 13	GER; 1; 1	GER; 2; 5	SVK; 1; 4	SVK; 2; 3	SVK; 3; 7	**HUN**; **1**; 1	HUN; 2; 7	**HUN**; **3**; 1	ESP; 1; 13	ESP; 2; 10	ESP; 3; 9	ARA; 1; 1	ARA; 2 Ret	ARA; 3; 18															4th	188
2021	ALL-INKL.COM Münnich Motorsport	Honda Civic Type R TCR	GER; 1; 4	GER; 2; 12	POR; 1; 5	**POR**; **2**; 8	ESP; 1; 15	ESP; 2; 13	HUN; 1; 8	HUN; 2; 8	CZE; 1; 2	CZE; 2; 3	FRA; 1; 4	FRA; 2; 7	ITA; 1; 3	ITA; 2; 6	RUS; 1 Ret	RUS; 2 DNS															6th	164
2022	ALL-INKL.COM Münnich Motorsport	Honda Civic Type R TCR	FRA; 1; 2	FRA; 2; 5	GER; 1 C	GER; 2 C	HUN; 1; 9	HUN; 2; 10	ESP; 1; 11	ESP; 2; 11	POR; 1 Ret	POR; 2 Ret	ITA; 1; 7	ITA; 2; 10	ALS; 1; 10	ALS; 2; 10	BHR; 1; 8	BHR; 2; 2	SAU; 1; 11	SAU; 2; 11													7th	149

^{†} Driver did not finish the race, but was classified as he completed over 90% of the race distance.

=== Complete Stock Car Brasil results ===
Year	Team	Car	1	2	3	4	5	6	7	8	9	10	11	12	13	14	15	16	17	18	19	20	21	Rank	Pts.	Ref
2018	RCM Motorsport	Chevrolet Cruze	INT; 1	CUR; 1	CUR; 2	VEL; 1	VEL; 2	LON; 1	LON; 2	SCZ; 1	SCZ; 2	GOI; 1	MOU; 1	MOU; 2	CAS; 1; 17	CAS; 2; 10	VCA; 1	VCA; 2	TAR; 1; 20	TAR; 2; 5	GOI; 1	GOI; 2	INT; 1	29th	13	

=== 24 Hours of Nürburgring results ===
Year	Team	Co-Drivers	Car	Class	Laps	Pos.	Class Pos.	Ref
2020	Team Castrol Honda Racing	(Portugal) Tiago Monteiro (Germany) Dominik Fugel (Germany) Markus Oestreich	Honda Civic Type R TCR (FK8)	TCR	78	20th	**1st**	

=== Complete FIA World Endurance Championship results ===
(key) (Races in bold indicate pole position; races in italics indicate fastest lap)

Year	Entrant	Class	Chassis	Engine	1	2	3	4	5	6	7	Rank	Points
2023	Floyd Vanwall Racing Team	Hypercar	Vanwall Vandervell 680	Gibson GL458 4.5 L V8	SEB; 8	ALG; Ret	SPA; Ret	LMS; Ret	MNZ; 12	FUJ; 11	BHR; 12	16th	6

=== 24 Hours of Le Mans results ===
Year	Team	Co-Drivers	Car	Class	Laps	Pos.	Class Pos.
2023	(Austria) Floyd Vanwall Racing Team	(France) Tom Dillmann (France) Tristan Vautier	Vanwall Vandervell 680-Gibson	Hypercar	165	DNF	DNF

=== Complete TCR World Tour results ===
(key) (Races in bold indicate pole position) (Races in italics indicate fastest lap)

Year	Team	Car	1	2	3	4	5	6	7	8	9	10	11	12	13	14	15	16	17	18	19	20	21	DC	Points
2023	Bratton Tito Bessone Team	Toyota GR Corolla Sport TCR	ALG; 1	ALG; 2	SPA; 1	SPA; 2	VAL; 1	VAL; 2	HUN; 1	HUN; 2	ELP; 1; 12	ELP; 2; 10	VIL; 1; 11	VIL; 2; 10	SYD; 1	SYD; 2	SYD; 3	BAT; 1	BAT; 2	BAT; 3	MAC; 1	MAC; 2		21st	26
2024	GOAT Racing	Honda Civic Type R TCR	VAL; 1; 3^{3}	VAL; 2; 8	MRK; 1; 9	MRK; 2; 2	MOH; 1; 5^{5}	MOH; 2; 3	**SAP**; **1**; 1^{2}	SAP; 2; 4	ELP; 1; 6	ELP; 2; 3	ZHZ; 1; 2^{6}	ZHZ; 2; 5	MAC; 1 Ret^{6}	MAC; 2; 2								4th	291
2025	GOAT Racing	Honda Civic Type R TCR	**AHR**; **1**; 4	AHR; 2; 1	AHR; 3; 1	CRT; 1; 8	CRT; 2; 5	CRT; 3; 4	MNZ; 1; 5	MNZ; 2; 7	CVR; 1; 3	CVR; 2; 6	BEN; 1 C	BEN; 2; 8	BEN; 3; 2	INJ; 1; 2	INJ; 2; 4	INJ; 3; 3	ZHZ; 1; 8	ZHZ; 2 Ret	ZHZ; 3; 12	MAC; 1; 4	MAC; 2; 5	3rd	385
2026	GOAT Racing	Honda Civic Type R TCR	MIS; 1; 7	MIS; 2; 7	CRT; 1	CRT; 2	CRT; 3	LEC; 1	LEC; 2	CVR; 1	CVR; 2	INJ; 1	INJ; 2	INJ; 3	CHE; 1	CHE; 2	CHE; 3	ZHZ; 1	ZHZ; 2	ZHZ; 3	MAC; 1	MAC; 2		18th*	28*

^{*} Season still in progress.

Sporting positions
Preceded by Mariano Acebal	Argentine Formula Renault Championship; Champion; 2000	Succeeded by Rafael Morgenstern
Preceded by Eric Salignon (Formula Renault 2000 Eurocup)	Formula Renault Masters; Champion; 2003	Succeeded by Scott Speed (Formula Renault 2000 Eurocup)
Preceded by Mauro Giallombardo; Bernardo Llaver	Winner of the 200 km de Buenos Aires; 2011; With: Mariano Werner	Succeeded by Néstor Girolami; Mauro Giallombardo
