= Moritz Jahn (writer) =

German novelist and an educator (1884–1979)

Moritz Jahn (27 March 1884 in Lilienthal, Lower Saxony – 19 January 1979 in Göttingen) was a Lower German novelist and an educator. He was also a poet best known for writing ballads, lyrical poetry, and narratives. He was also a member of the Nazi Party. He has written notable literary works in Low German such as Frangula and Luzifer.

== Life ==
Moritz Jahn was born in Lilienthal, Lower Saxony, Germany, in 1884 to a Low German-speaking family. He grew up in Hanover and wanted to be a teacher. His father died while he was young. From 1901-1904, he trained to be a teacher in Hanover and primarily self-studied at Hanover's city library. From 1906 to 1921, Jahn taught at teacher training schools in Aurich and Melle, where he published essays on local history and folklore. There, he learned the Low German dialect and learned local stories of the East Frisia region. In 1908, he wrote his first Low Geman poems and other works of East Frisian literature and was honored by local associations for his contributions.

In 1921, Jahn became headmaster of an elementary school in Geismar, where he studied German literature and art history in Göttingen. Here, he focused on his writing career and published his first literary pieces. He was influenced by the local art movement and Börries von Münchhausen in particular. From 1921 to 1925, he continued his studies, and in 1933, Jahn joined the Nazi Party. In 1935, he was expelled from the Nazis for belonging to a Göttingen club but remained part of the National Socialist Teachers League.

On October 24, 1941, Jahn was one of the 37 writers from 15 European countries who participated in the annual Deutscher Dichtertreffen, German Writer's Meeting, in Weimar, Germany. There, the writers formed a new European Writers' Union. Another German Writer's Meeting was held the next year as well, which served as propaganda for Germany's 'New European Order.' The meetings generally discussed a re-ordering of the German literary field into 'European literature.' At these conferences, Jahn expressed Germany's right to reshape Europe and asserted Germany's devotion to European literature, stating, "None of the great culture-nations of our continent have devoted themselves to the same degree to the knowledge of European literature as has the German." He declared the Germans to be "a Philolog, a friend of language... It has never been in his nature and will never be in his nature to put down or suppress a foreign language." He posed a "inter-Nationalist" model of Europe composed of nations with their rural traditions protected by the Nazis.

In 1944, Jahn received his doctorate of the University of Göttingen . During this period of time until 1944, Jahn wrote his most famous works, both in Low German and High German.

Jahn was pensioned from his headmaster position in 1944 and became free to write. In 1945, Jahn left the Protestant Church. In 1959, he was awarded for the Fritz Reuter Prize and Klaus Groth Prize.

He died on January 19, 1979, at the age of 94.

A civic center in Göttinger called Moritz-Jahn-Haus is named after Jahn. On March 27, 2014, the state of Göttingen celebrated his 130th birthday.

== Career ==
His most notable works were originally written in Low German, including lyrical poetry, ballads, narratives, and historical accounts. His works are mainly located in the Lower German region. He has a wide range of works including meditative, tragedy, or satire. Jahn's favourite theme is the life of nerds and their failures in society, such as his collection featuring Ulenspegel un Jan Dood (1933). His other well-known works are narrative works like Frangula (1933), De Moorfro (1950), and Lucifer (1956). He published a poetry collection entitled Unkepunz: Ein deutsches Gesicht in 1931 and Im weiten Land in 1938.

== Works ==
- Die Geschichte von den Leuten an der Außenföhrde (1930)
- Boleke Roleffs: Eine niederdeutsche Erzählung (1930)
- Unkepunz: Ein deutsches Gesicht (1931)
- Frangula oder Die himmlischen Weiber im Wald (1933)
- Ulenspegel un Jan Dood: Niederdeutsche Gedichte (1933)
- Im weiten Land: Erzählungen (1938)
- Die Gleichen (1939)
- Das Denkmal des Junggesellen: Eine harmlose Geschichte (1942)
- Das Denkmal des Junggesellen. Eine harmlose Geschichte (1948)
- De Moorfro (1950)
- Luzifer (1955)
