= Autódromo José Carlos Bassi =

- Location: Villa Mercedes, San Luis, Argentina
- Coordinates: 33°41′11.74″S 65°29′42.99″W
- Opened: 12 May 2017; 9 years ago
- Former names: Autódromo Internacional de La Pedrera
- Major events: Former: TCR World Tour (2023); TCR South America (2023); Turismo Nacional (2019–2020, 2022); Turismo Carretera (2017–2018); TC Pista (2017–2018)

Full Circuit (2017–present)
- Length: 4.368 km (2.714 mi)
- Turns: 18
- Race lap record: 1:45.588 ( (Argentina) Agustín Canapino, Chevrolet Chevy, 2017, TC)

Autódromo José Carlos Bassi (previously known as Autódromo Internacional de La Pedrera) is a 4.368 km (2.714 mi) street circuit located in Villa Mercedes, San Luis, Argentina.

== History ==
The circuit was named after José Carlos Bassi, who was also responsible for the nearby circuits in San Luis Province, Autódromo Rosendo Hernández and Potrero de los Funes Circuit. It is located around Estadio Único de Villa Mercedes. When the circuit is not used for racing, the paddock area is used as the parking lot for the stadium.

The circuit is notable for its width; the main straight is 30 m (33 yd) wide, tapering to 20 m (22 yd) for the rest of the layout.

The circuit was inaugurated on 12–14 May 2017 with Turismo Carretera. Until 2022, it hosted national events, such as Turismo Carretera and Turismo Nacional. In March 2023, it was announced that the circuit to host TCR World Tour and TCR South America events in August 2023.

== Lap records ==
As of August 2023, the fastest official race lap records at the Autódromo José Carlos Bassi are listed as:

Category	Time	Driver	Vehicle	Event
Full Circuit (2017–present): 4.368 km (2.714 mi)
Turismo Carretera	1:45.588	Agustín Canapino	Chevrolet Chevy	2017 2nd La Pedrera Turismo Carretera round
TCR Touring Car	1:47.331	Yann Ehrlacher	Lynk & Co 03 FL TCR	2023 La Pedrera TCR World Tour round
Turismo Nacional Clase 3	1:52.908	José Manuel Urcera	Honda New Civic	2020 La Pedrera Turismo Nacional round
Turismo Nacional Clase 2	1:54.757	Nicolás Posco	Ford Fiesta Kinetic	2020 La Pedrera Turismo Nacional round
