= Dallara =

Automobile chassis manufacturer

Coordinates: 44.723°N 10.060°E

Dallara Group S.r.l.
- Type: Private
- Industry: Automotive
- Founded: 1972
- Founder: Giampaolo Dallara
- Headquarters: Varano de' Melegari, Italy
- Key people: Giampaolo Dallara (President); Andrea Pontremoli (CEO); Aldo Costa (Chief Technical Officer)
- Website: www.dallara.it

Dallara Group S.r.l. is an Italian multinational manufacturer of racing cars. Founded in 1972 by Giampaolo Dallara, Dallara is the sole manufacturer of racing cars for the IndyCar Series, Indy NXT, FIA Formula 2, FIA Formula 3 and Super Formula Championships. The company also produces cars for endurance races such as the 24 Hours of Le Mans and the 24 Hours of Daytona.

Dallara has also been involved in the development and production of both Formula E cars and Haas F1 Team cars. It is headquartered in Varano, Italy, near the Varano race track.

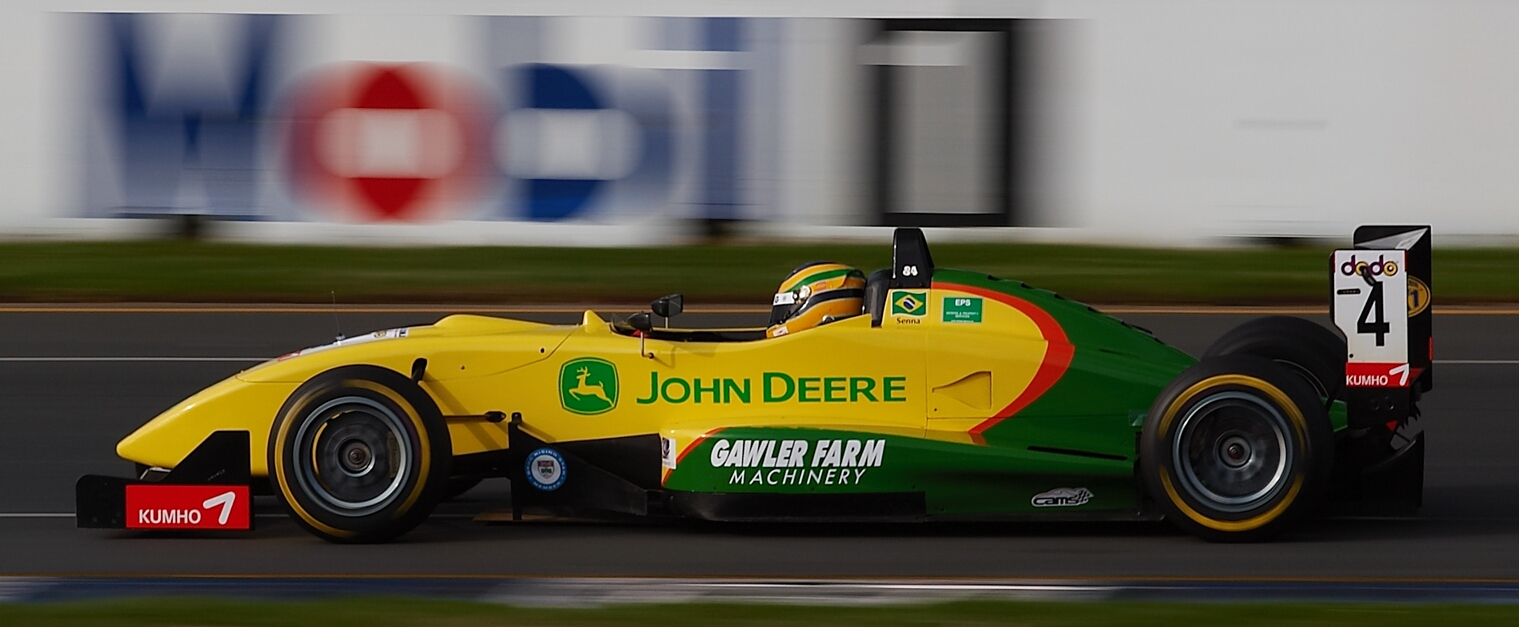
Bruno Senna drives a Dallara F304 Formula Three car during a support race at the 2006 Australian Grand Prix

== Early years ==
The company was founded by designer Giampaolo Dallara in 1972 in Varano de' Melegari, near Parma, Italy, and started building chassis for sports car racing and hillclimbing, racing in the smaller engine classes. Giampaolo Dallara previously worked for Ferrari, Maserati, Lamborghini and De Tomaso, and co-founded Autodromo Riccardo Paletti in Varano. Dallara designed his first Formula Three car for Walter Wolf Racing in 1978. Dallara also had a brief involvement in Formula 3000 in the mid-1980s.

== Formula Three ==
The first F3 car under the Dallara name came in 1981, and the cars became particularly successful in Italy. Since 1985 Dallara drivers have taken the Italian Formula Three Championship every year except 1990. The late 1980s and early 1990s also saw Dallara make inroads into the German and French markets, winning the German title in 1987 and the French in 1987 and 1992.

1993 was the first year that Dallaras were entered in the British Formula Three Championship and was the beginning of the company's dominance of Formula Three. The new F393 featured major aerodynamic changes compared to its predecessor and introduced a monodamper front suspension layout. The F393 won every race in the Italian, French and German championships that year, while the British series saw numerous entrants – including champion Kelvin Burt – forced to switch from Reynard or Ralt chassis to Dallara in order to remain competitive. TOMS would win the Japanese championship with its own cars in 1993 and 1994 before switching to Dallara chassis. From then on Dallara would dominate the Formula Three market, although Martini had some success in France and Germany in the late 1990s, including Sébastien Bourdais winning the French title in 1999. Since then Dallara has won every major Formula Three title, although Ho-Pin Tung won the 2006 Recaro F3 Cup in a Lola against a field that included several current Dallaras. Dallaras have won the Macau Grand Prix since 1993.

== Formula One ==
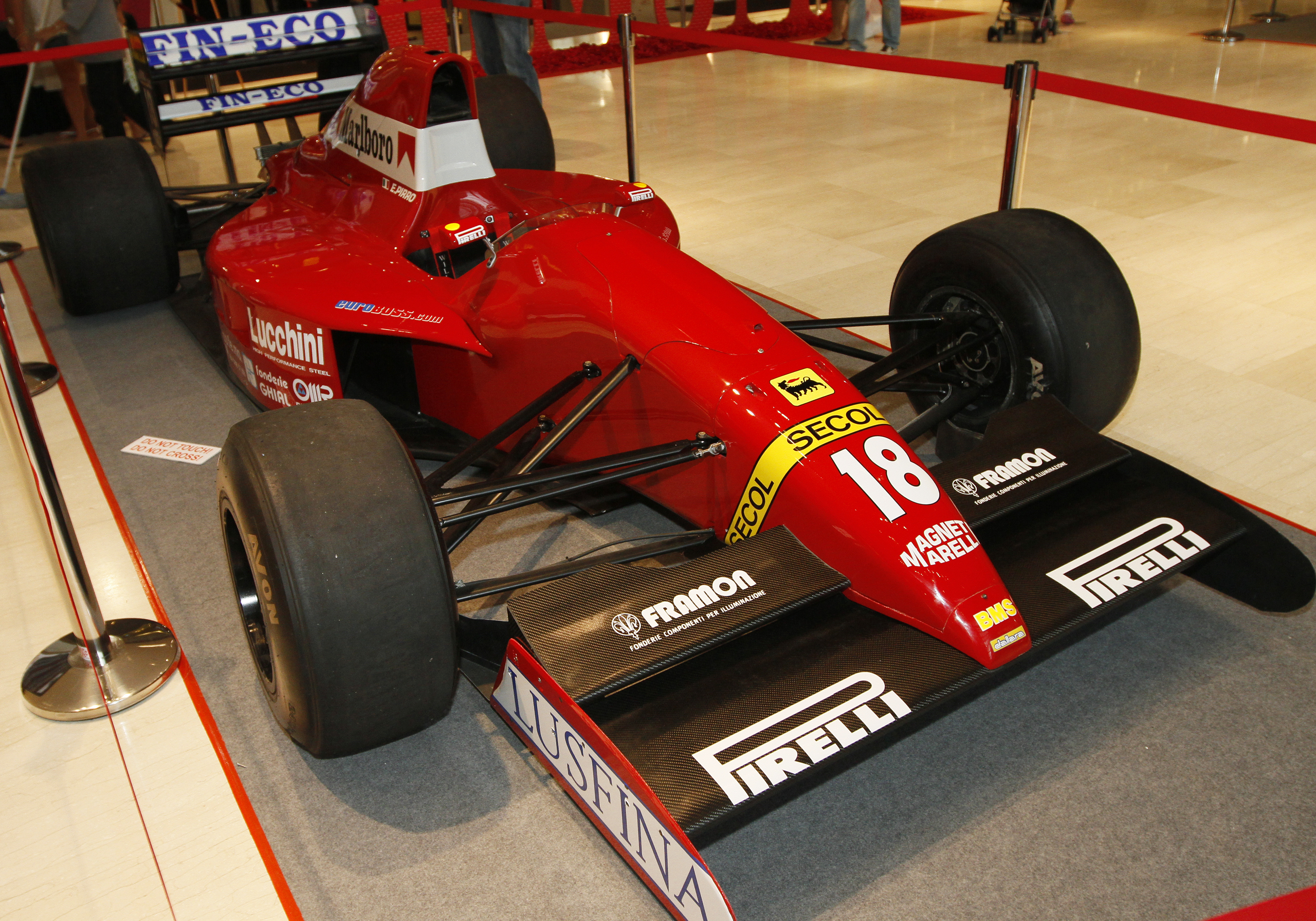
A Dallara 191 Formula One car from the 1991 season.

In 1988 the company became a Formula One constructor, after being hired by BMS Scuderia Italia to build their chassis. The relationship between the Italian constructor and Beppe Lucchini's racing outfit endured until 1992, with their best result being two third places: one at the 1989 Canadian Grand Prix with Andrea de Cesaris; the other at the 1991 San Marino Grand Prix, thanks to JJ Lehto. The Constructors' Championship results were: no classification in 1988, 8th in 1989 (with 8 points), 15th (with no points) in 1990, 8th in 1991 (with 5 points) and 10th in 1992 (with 2 points) by Pierluigi Martini.

Dallara returned briefly to F1 in 1999, building the test-chassis for Honda's planned but aborted return to the series.

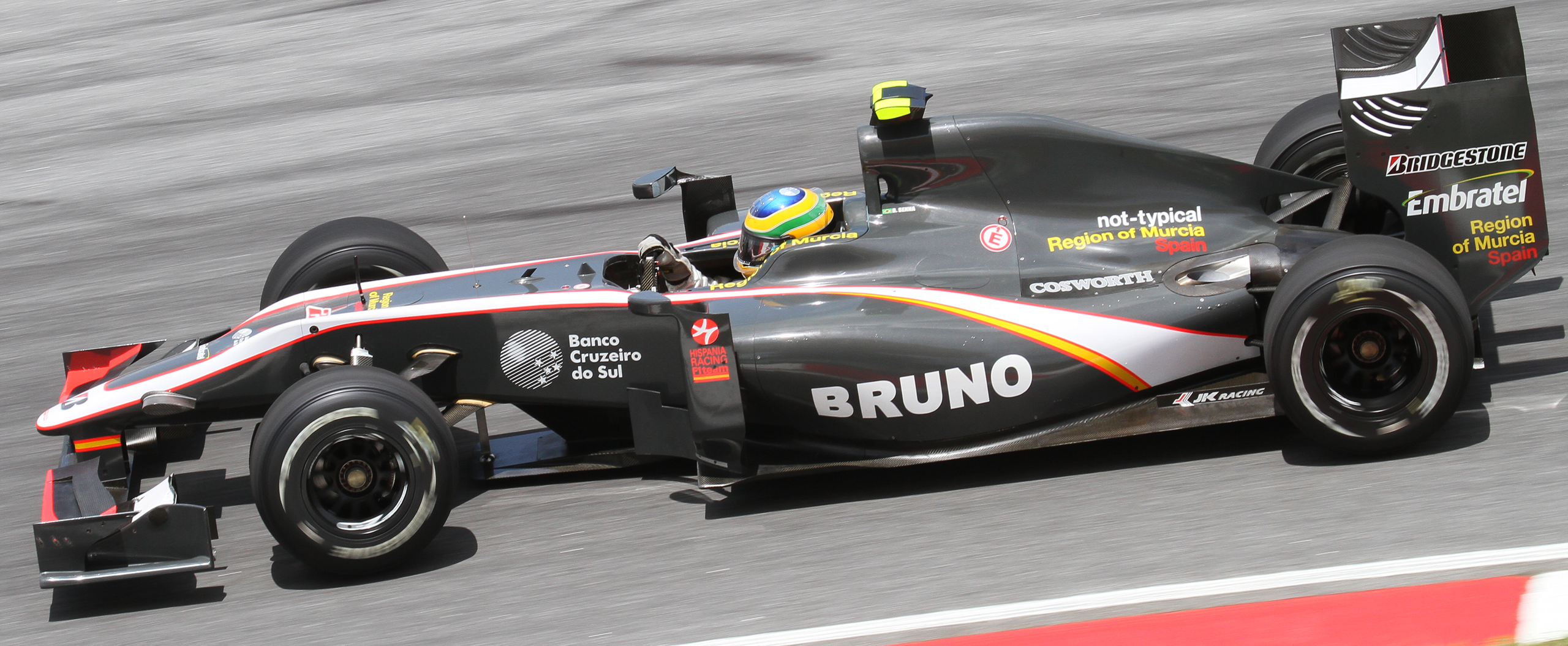
The Dallara-designed Hispania F110 chassis being driven by Bruno Senna before the 2010 Malaysian Grand Prix.

During 2004, Dallara recruited ex-Jordan, Stewart and Jaguar F1 designer Gary Anderson, leading to speculation that the Italian company was working on another F1 project. Late in 2004 the nascent Midland team announced that Dallara would be designing and building their Formula One chassis which was due to be entered for the 2006 season. Following Midland's purchase of the Jordan team for early entry to F1 in 2005, Dallara continued co-operating with the team technically. However, the relationship fizzled out as Midland focussed its resources on developing the existing Jordan infrastructure, and a new Dallara F1 chassis never appeared.

Dallara built the cars for Hispania's entry in the 2010 season. The Hispania team's financial problems—which delayed payment of money owed to Dallara and the completion of the cars—and the alleged low quality of the F110 chassis resulted in the two parties officially ending their partnership in May 2010. The car was used in all 2010 races without any development except the graphics. They had only one aerodynamic configuration, used for all races, including Monte Carlo and Monza. Geoff Willis, who joined Hispania in March 2010, criticized the F110, saying that he was disappointed at the quality and level of engineering in the car and that the design of the car was missing a lot of contemporary practices commonly employed in the process of building a Formula One car.

On 15 April 2014 Gene Haas confirmed his new Formula One team, Haas F1 Team, had entered talks to form a partnership with Dallara in 2015 for the build of their first car. On 21 February 2016, the Haas VF-16 was officially unveiled. This arrangement has continued since with Dallara designing all the Haas cars up to and including the 2026 season.

== IndyCar ==
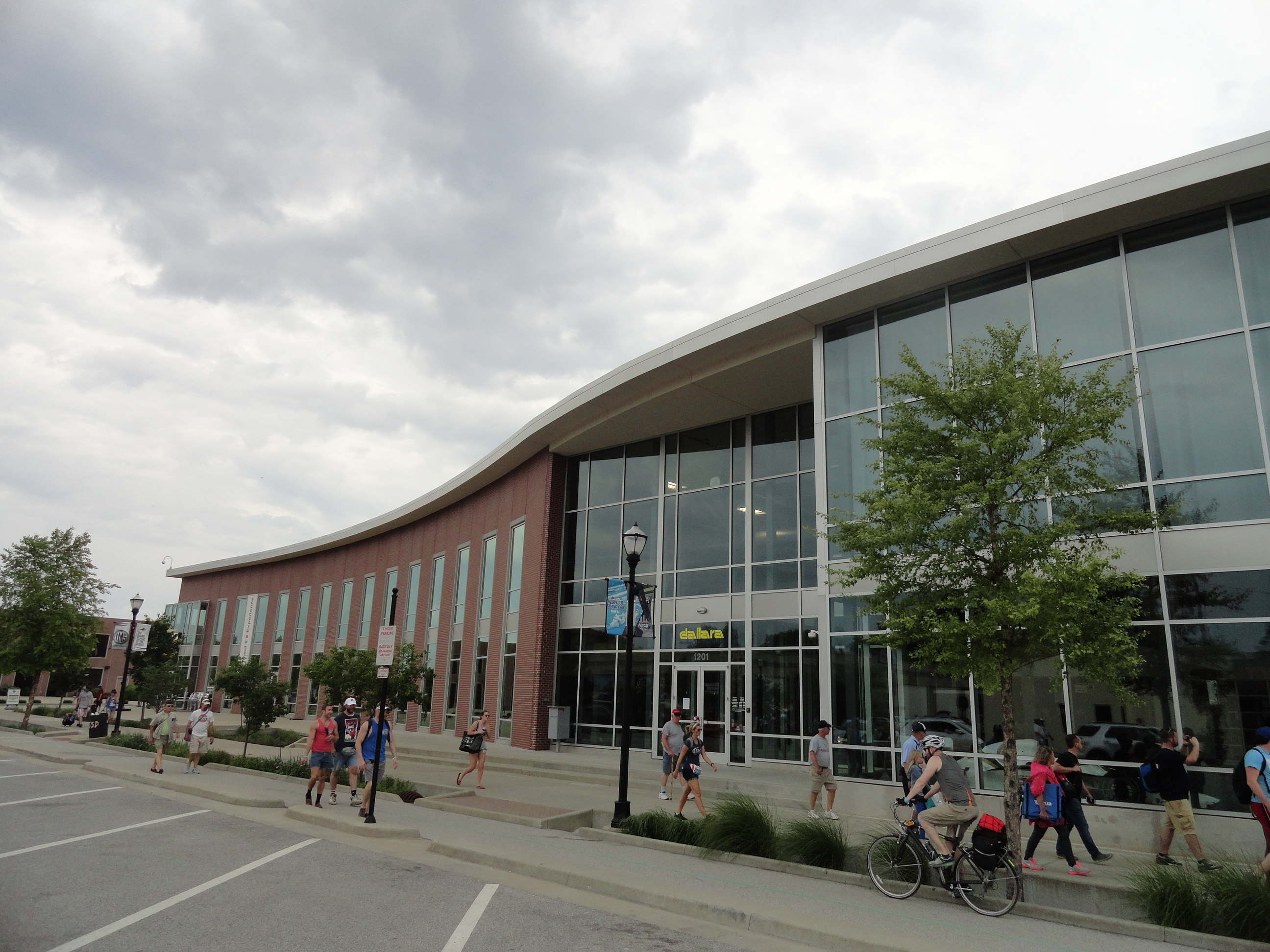
Dallara IndyCar Factory near the Indianapolis Motor Speedway

Dallara debuted as a chassis builder and supplier at the IndyCar Series in 1997, and has been the single chassis builder and supplier since 2007. The manufacturer has won seventeen of the twenty Indianapolis 500s they have contested. In 2013, Dallara reached its milestone 200th Indy car victory at Barber.

In 2012 the company opened an engineering center in Speedway, Indiana, at the Speed Zone Redevelopment Area near the Indianapolis Motor Speedway, where they produce and assemble the IndyCar. The same building also houses an entertainment center, where visitors can learn how a racing car is manufactured.

=== First generation (IR-7) ===
Dallara was one of the original three chassis constructors when the Indy Racing League debuted its own chassis formula during the 1997 season. The IRL's design plan was to utilize chassis for three seasons. Various mandatory or optional update kits would become available for the chassis each year.

The first model year (1997) was named the IR-7. The cars were most notably differentiated from the competing G-Force chassis by the ovoid shape of the air intake inlet, while the G-Force's were triangular and molded around the roll bar. The IR-8 (1998) and IR-9 (1999) were essentially 1997 model year chassis with various update kits.

Jim Guthrie won Dallara's first Indy car race at Phoenix on 23 March 1997. Eddie Cheever won Dallara's first Indianapolis 500 in 1998, in his Oldsmobile-powered IR-7 chassis. Dallara won the Indy Racing League championship in both 1998 and 1999.

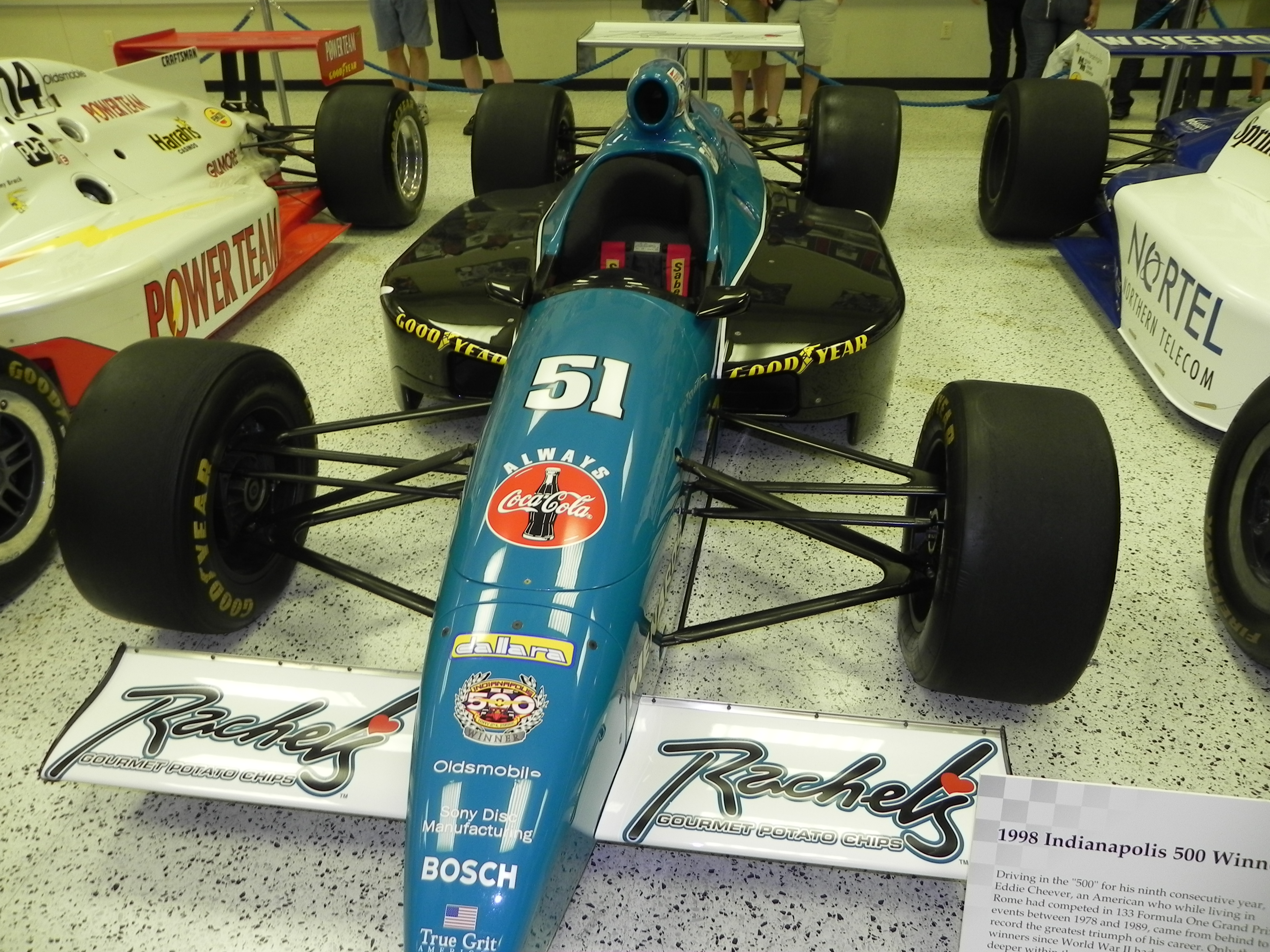
Dallara's first Indianapolis 500 victory was achieved by Eddie Cheever in 1998 (IR-8).

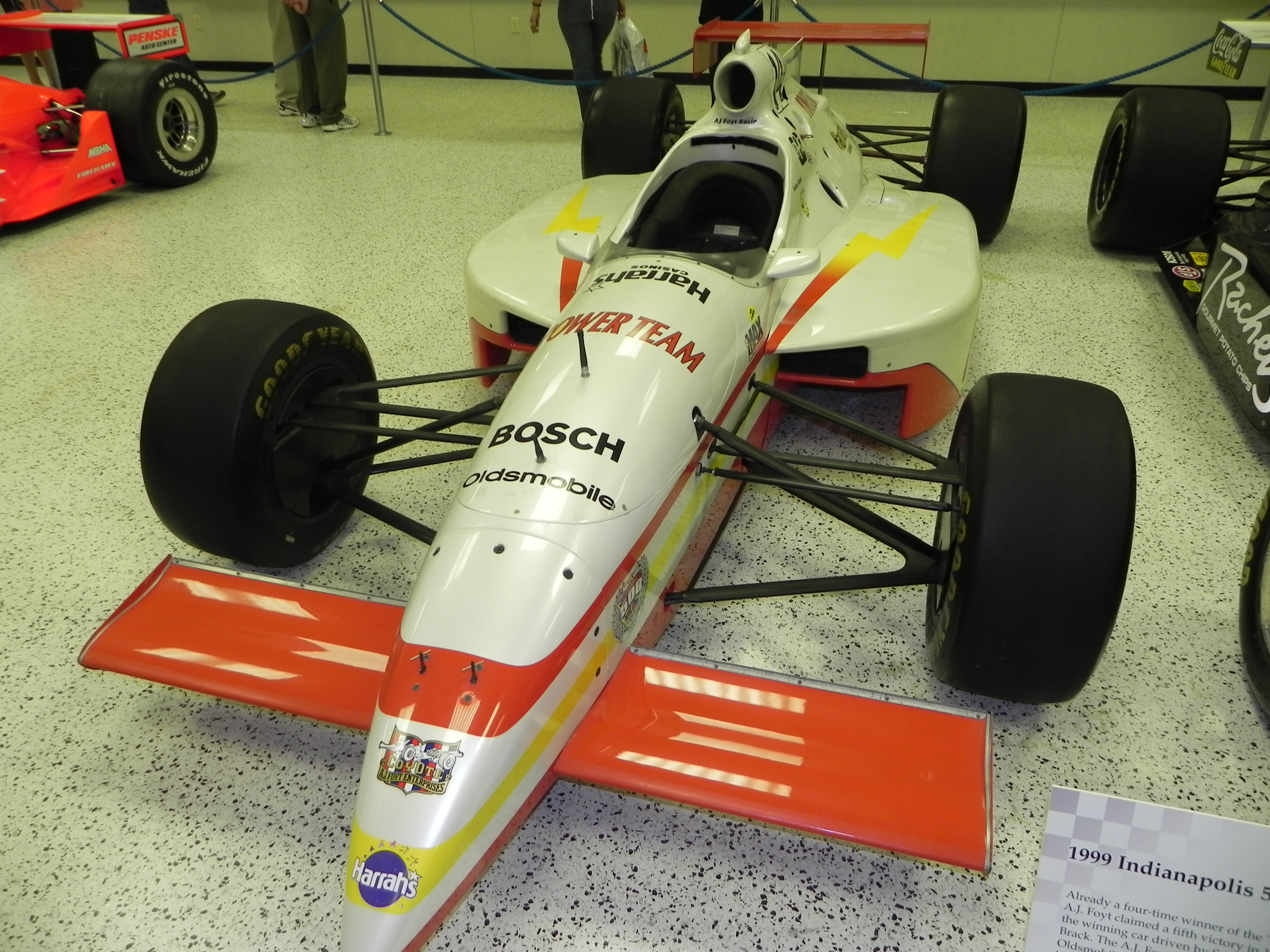
Dallara's second Indianapolis 500 victory was achieved by Kenny Bräck in 1999 (IR-9).

=== Second generation (IR-00) ===
A new model chassis was introduced for the 2000 season; named the IR-00. Once again, chassis would be raced for a three-season span and the previous generation of cars (IR-7 through IR-9) were not permitted. When updated for 2001 the chassis was designated as the IR-01 and for 2002 it was referred to as the IR-02.

Dallara won the Indianapolis 500 in both 2001 and 2002, and was driven by the Indy Racing League champion in all three seasons (2000–2002).

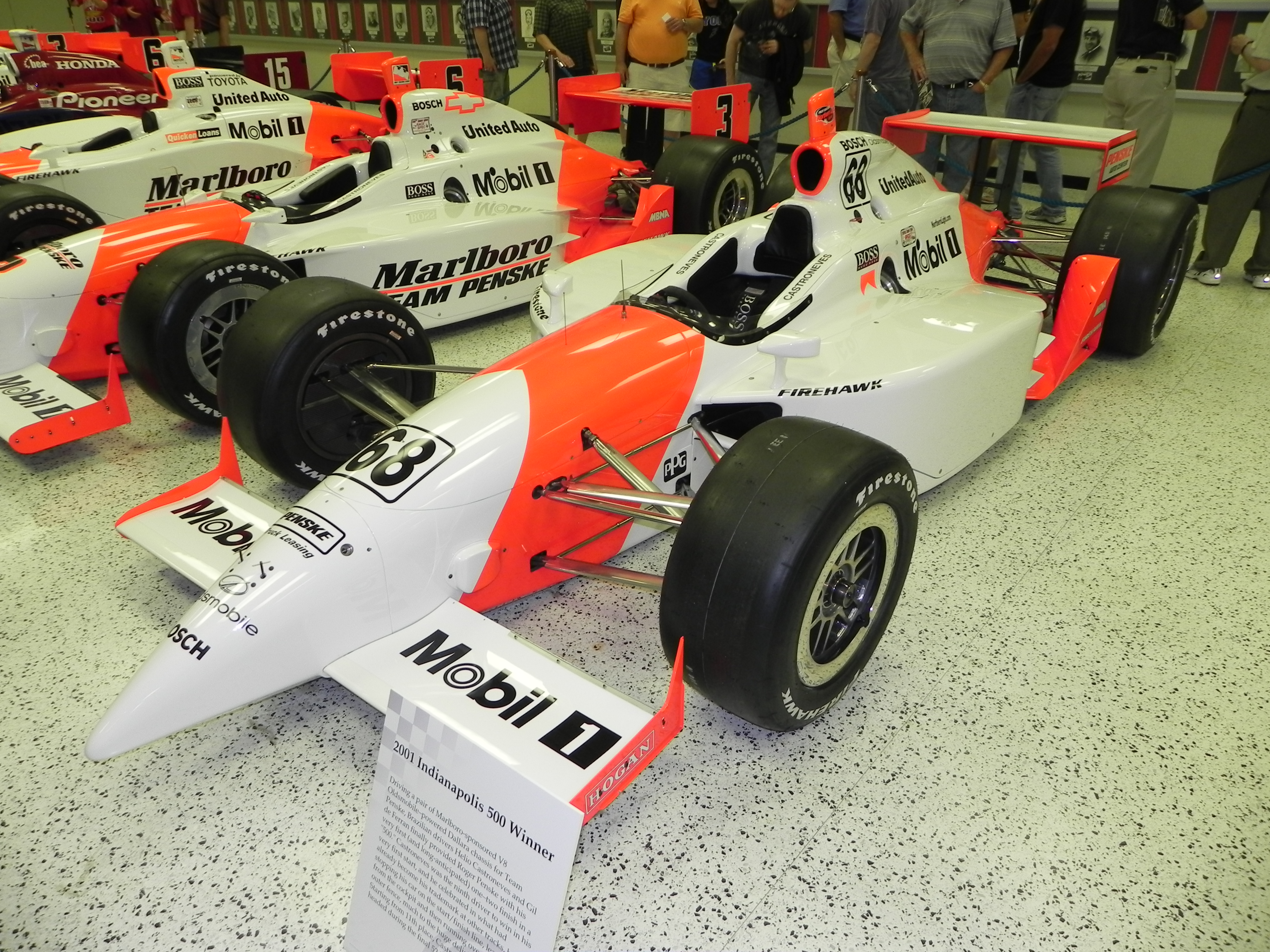
Indianapolis 500 winning car of Helio Castroneves in 2001 (IR-01).

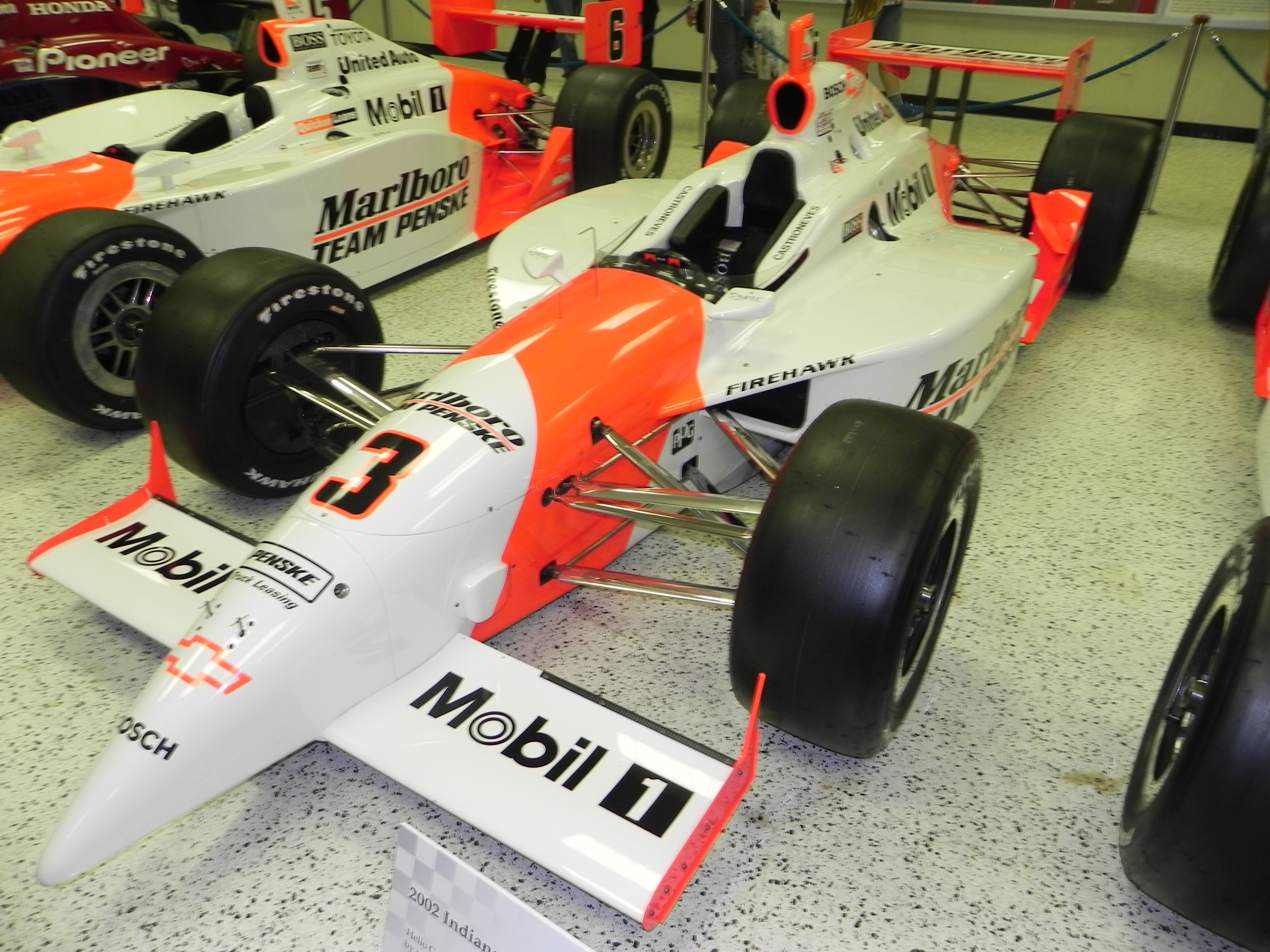
Indianapolis 500 winning car of Helio Castroneves in 2002 (IR-02).

=== Third generation (IR-03/IR-04/IR-05) ===
For the 2003 season, Dallara rolled out the new IR-03 chassis. This chassis would later become the de facto "spec-car" in the series. An aerodynamic update kit was released for 2004, which changed its designation to IR-04 and later in 2007, which changed its designation to IR-05. In addition, paddle-shifters began seeing use in 2008, further developing and evolving this generation of Dallaras. Chassis bearing both the IR-03 and the IR-05 designations saw use through the end of the 2011 season. For the 2006 season, over 80% of the field began the season with a Dallara, a possible symptom of Panoz's (manufacturer of the G-Force chassis) perceived lack of interest. This was around the time Panoz began delivering the DP01 chassis to the rival Champ Car series. From 2007 to 2011 all IndyCar teams used the IR-05 chassis, although a few teams entered a Panoz/G-Force chassis into the 2007 Indianapolis 500 singly. Some smaller teams continued to utilize the slightly older IR-03 designated chassis, particularly at Indianapolis, with update kits installed to bring it up to equally competitive ground with the newer-assembled IR-05 due to cheaper costs. Dan Wheldon famously won the 2011 Indy 500 driving a nine year old IR-03. IndyCar implemented a general chassis and engine development freeze from the start of the 2009 season. The series began focusing on a new chassis/engine package to be rolled out for 2012. By this time, the Dallara IR-03/05 was exclusively paired with the Honda Indy V8, as other engine manufactures had departed.

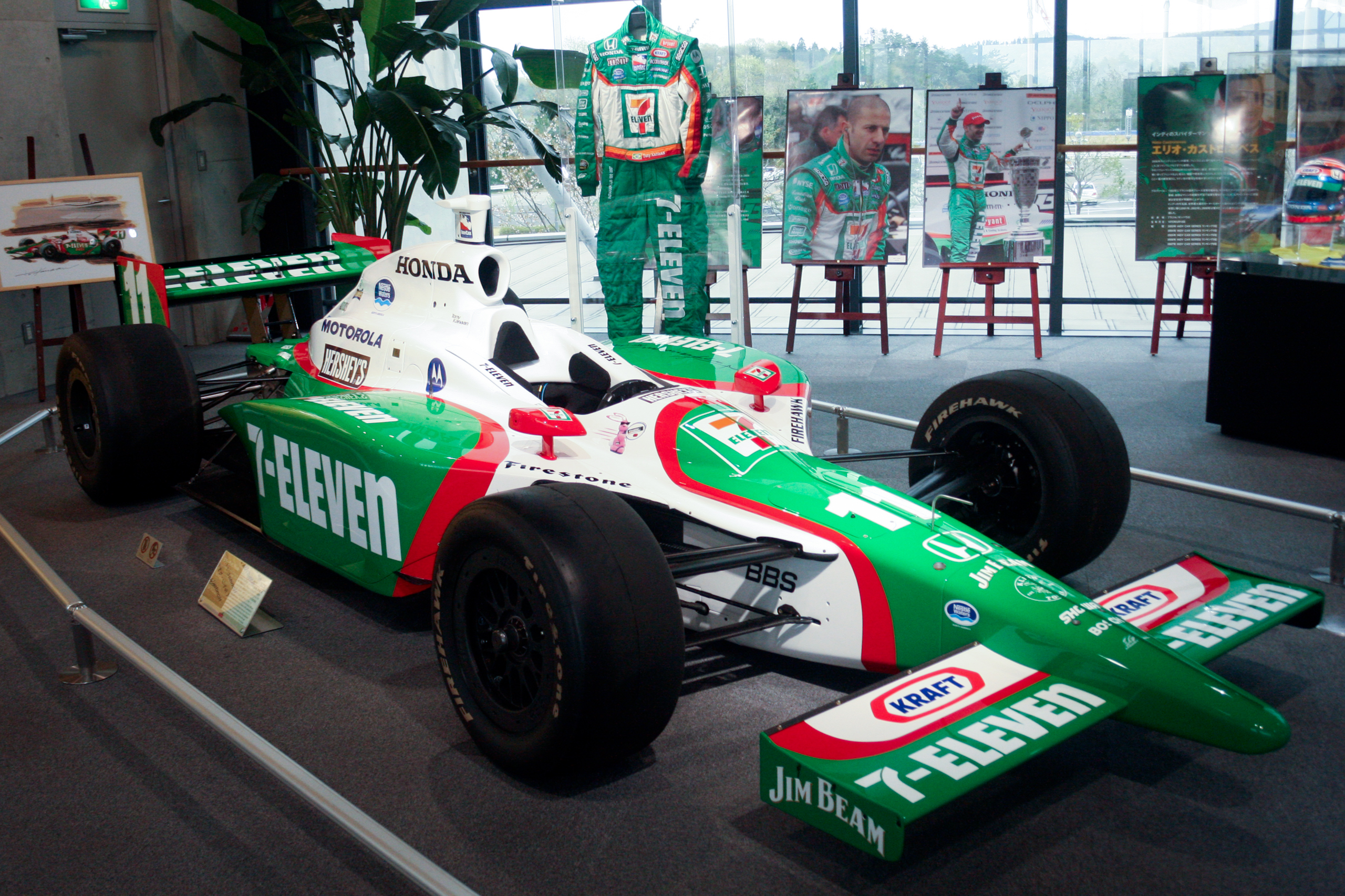
Tony Kanaan's 2004 Dallara IR-03.

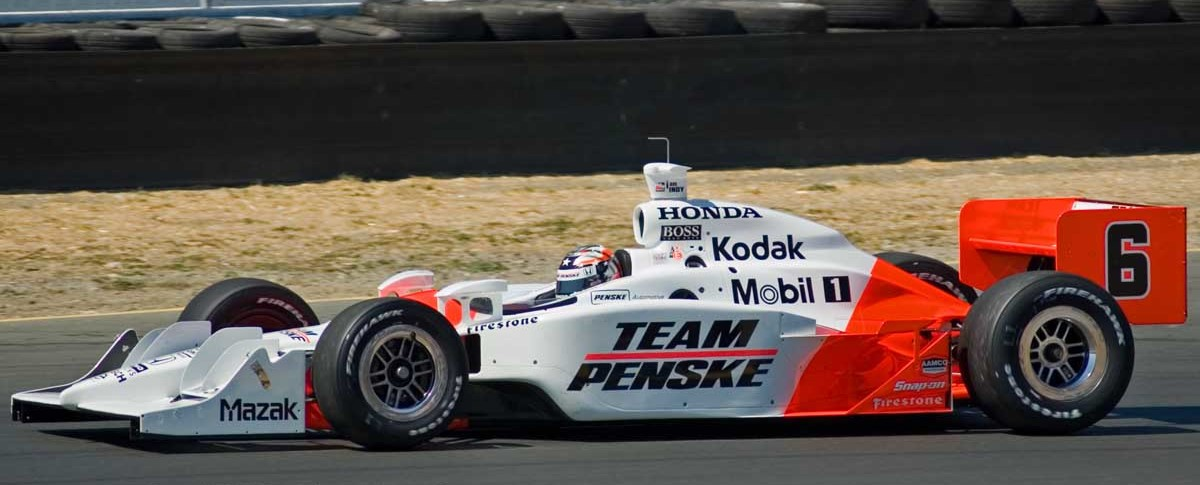
Sam Hornish Jr. at Sonoma Raceway in 2007

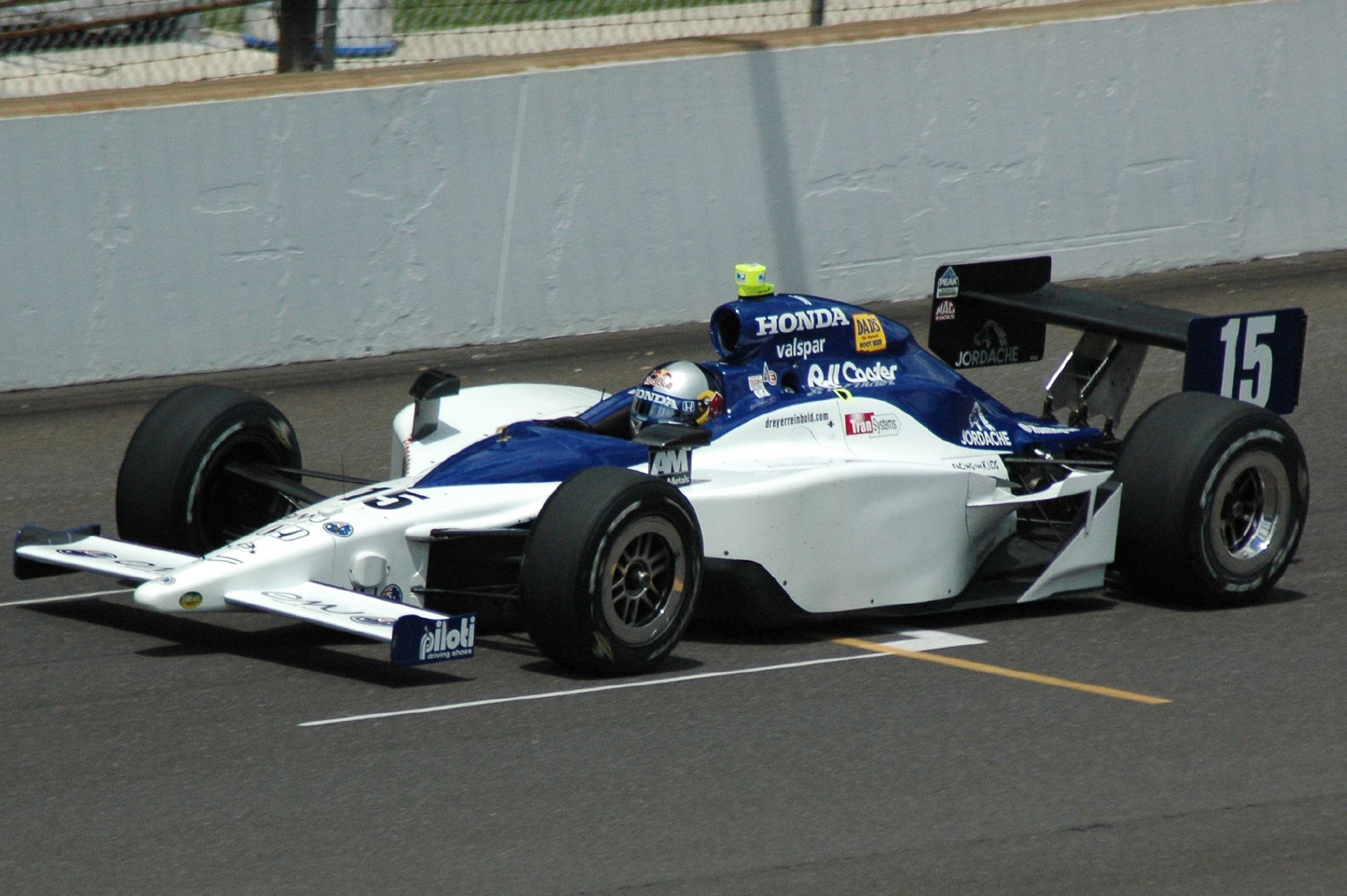
A Dallara IR-05 practicing for the Indianapolis 500

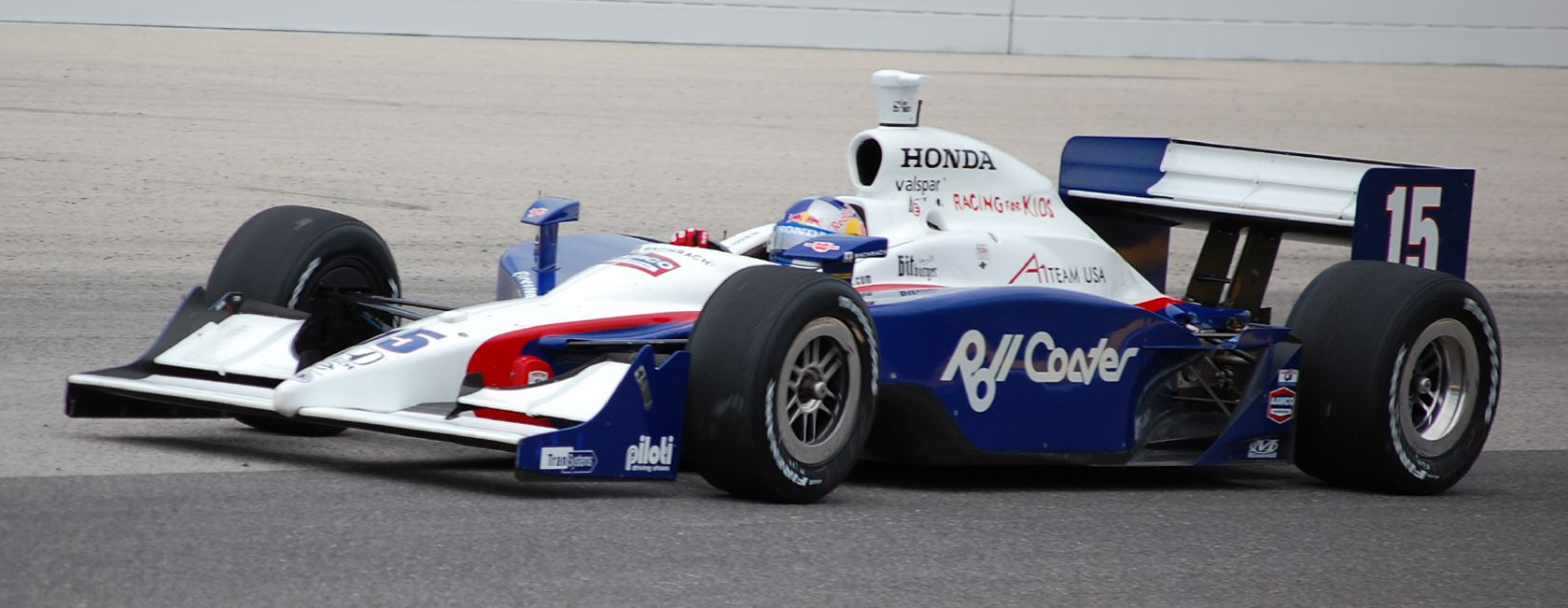
Dallara IR-05 at the Milwaukee Mile in 2007.

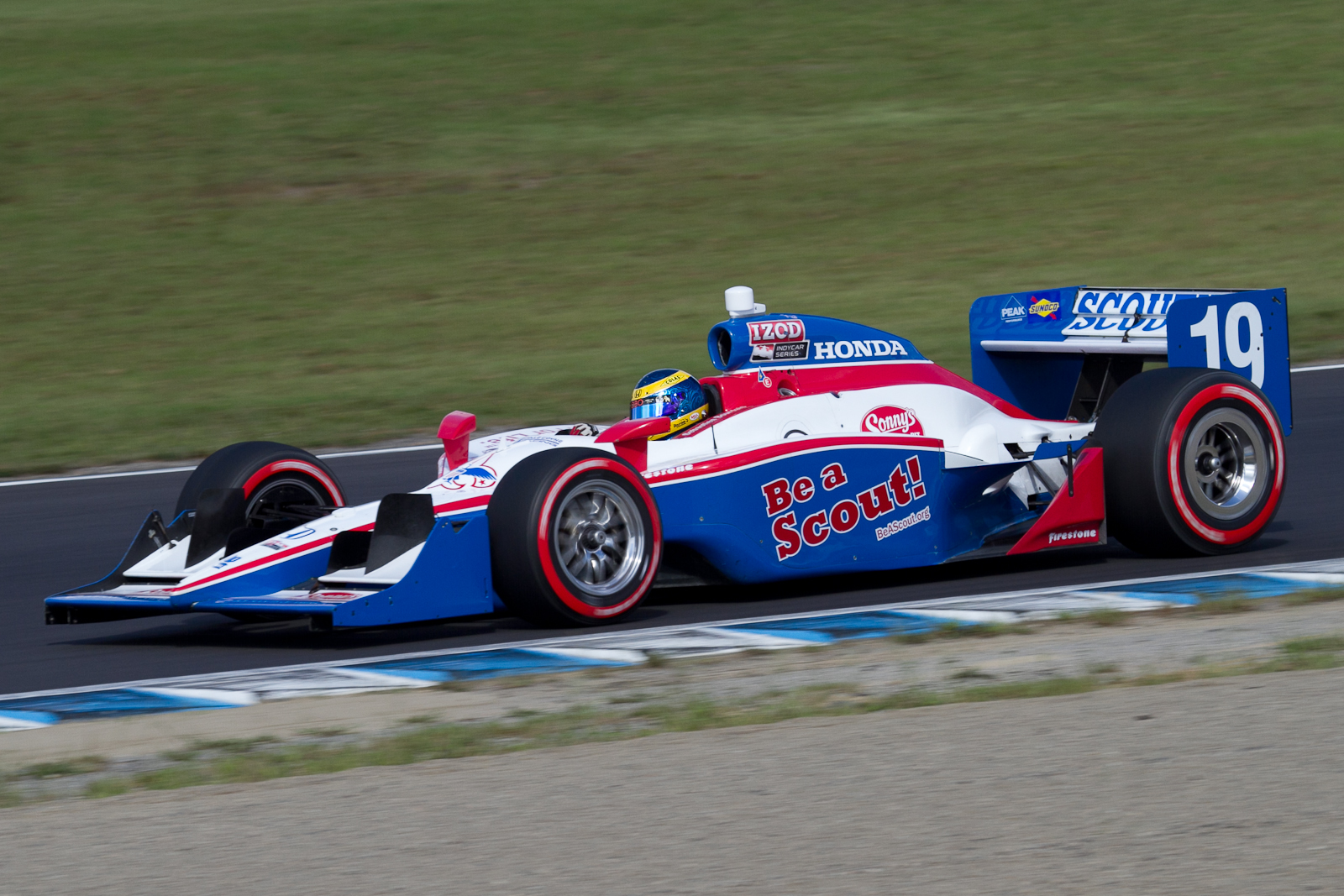
2011-spec Dallara IR-05.

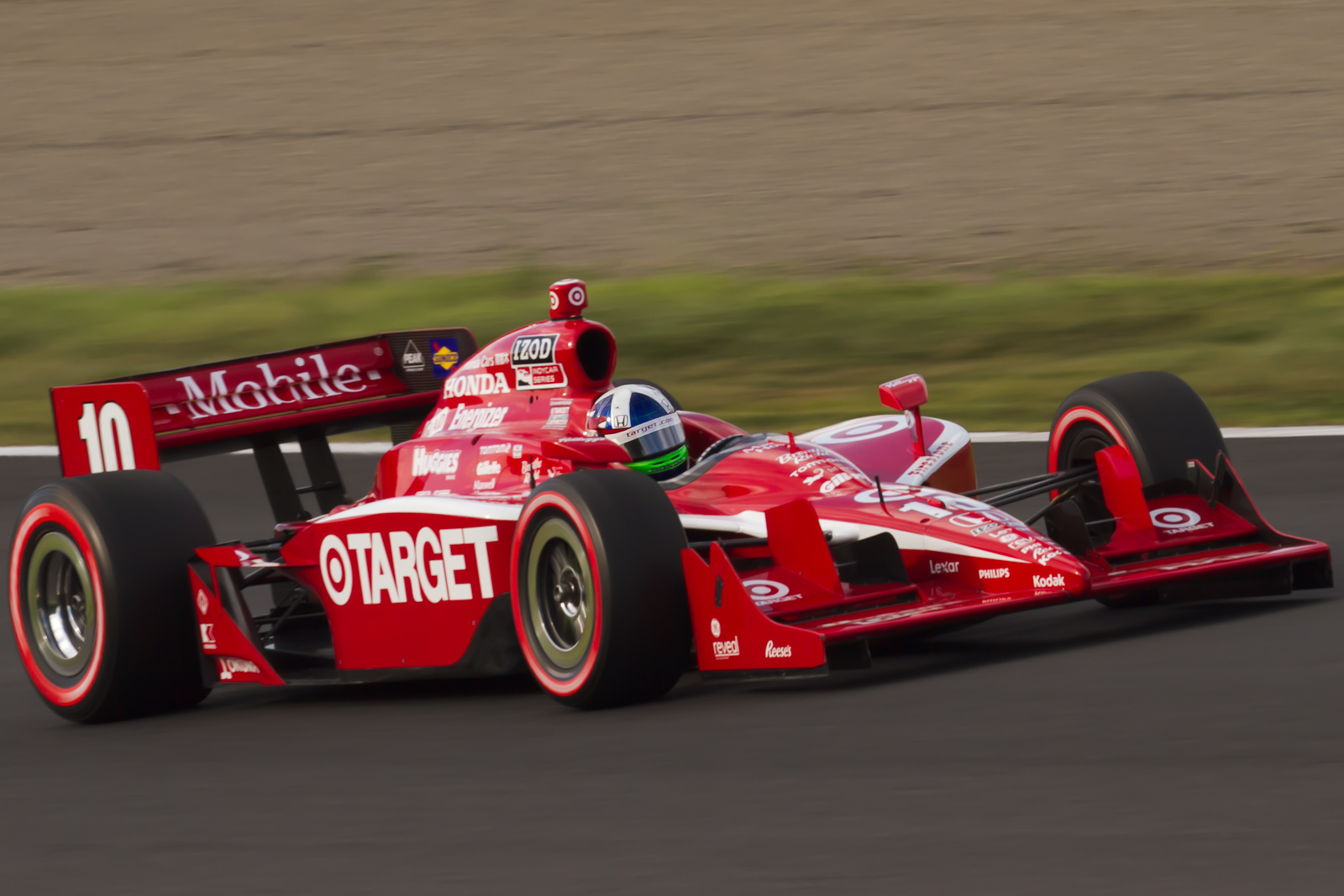
Dallara IR-05 qualifying at the 2011 Indy Japan 300

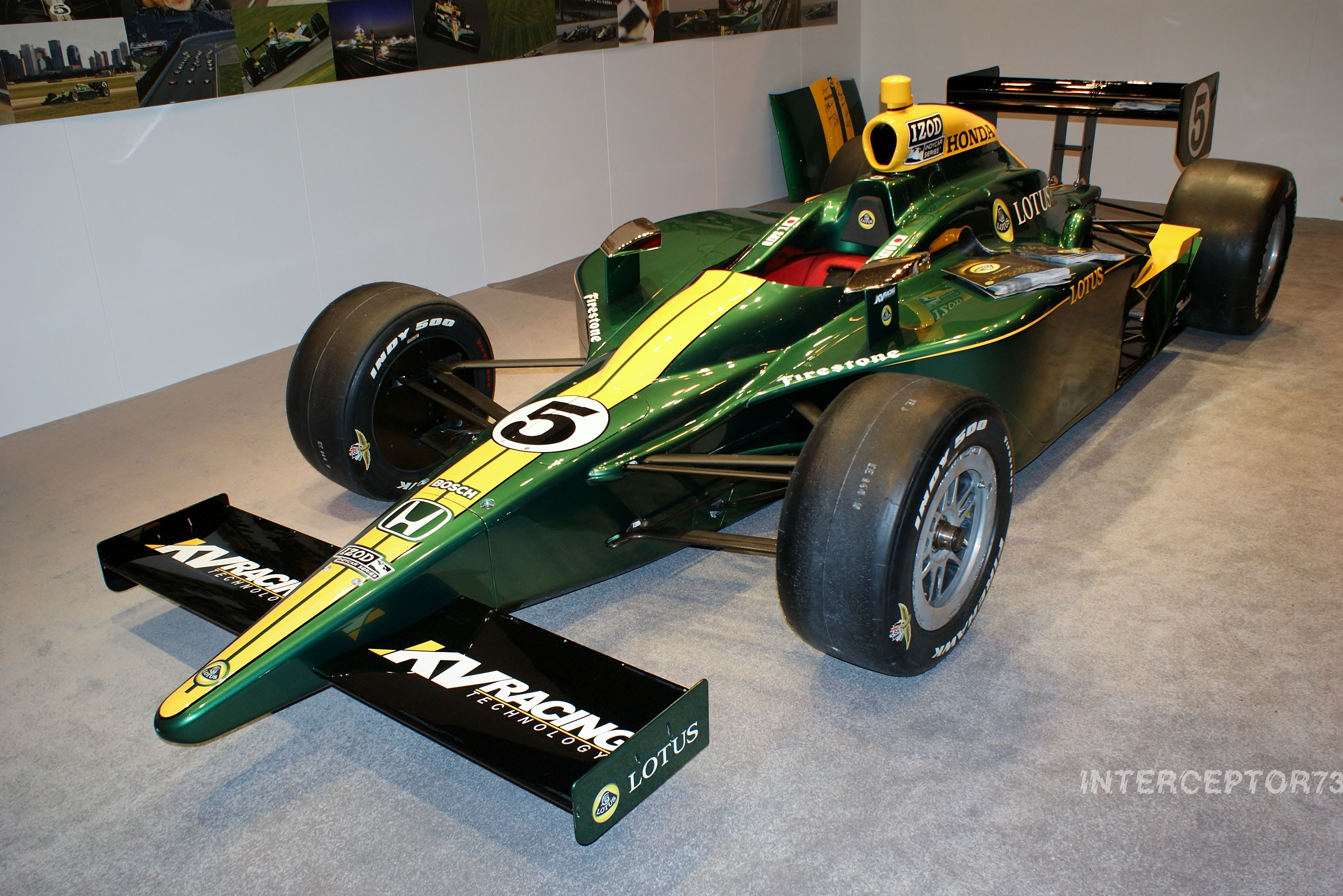
KV Racing Technology Dallara-Honda IR-05

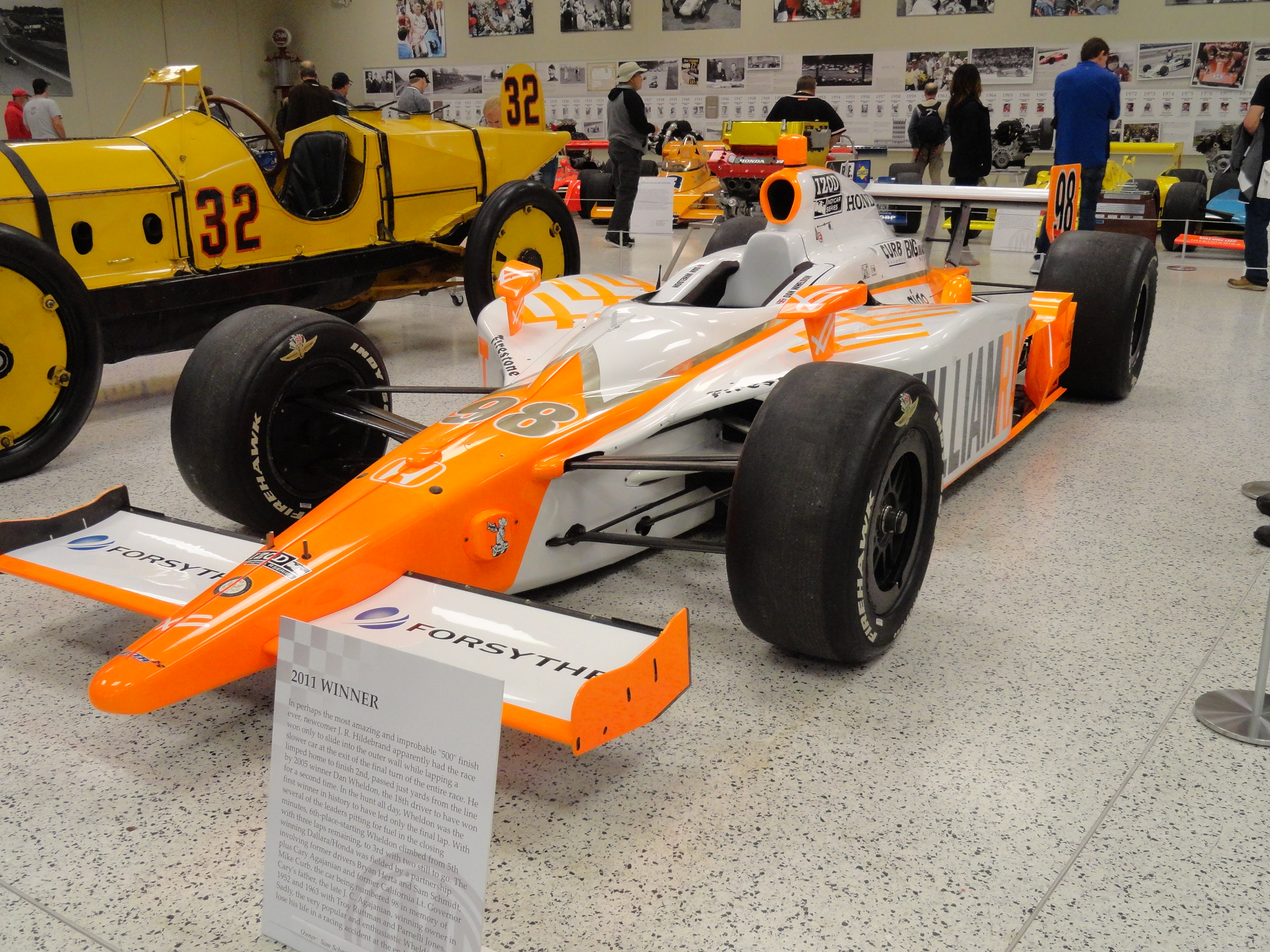
2011 Indianapolis 500-winning chassis

=== Fourth generation (IR-12/DW-12) ===
Starting in 2012, Dallara began providing the common monocoque and suspension parts for the new IndyCar formulae – known as the IndyCar Safety Cell – with the intent that the bodywork and aero parts can and will be provided by other manufacturers. The cars will be branded by the make who provides the "Aero Kit." Dallara rolled out the chassis with its own optional spec aero kit. The aero kit concept was temporarily shelved due to cost concerns, making the Dallara kit the universal spec for 2012–2014. Unique aero kits (manufactured by Chevrolet and Honda, respectively) were introduced for 2015–2017, and Dallara ceased to support and produce their own. In 2018, the third generation of aero kits was introduced for the DW-12, again returning to a universal spec kit for all entries known as UAK18 and will be used through 2026. On 18 October 2011, Dallara confirmed that the 2012 series car would be named after the late IndyCar driver Dan Wheldon (DW-12) in honor of his work testing the car before his death two days prior at Las Vegas Motor Speedway, with the new bumper/nerf bar section being featured, it was designed to prevent many similar single-seater crashes such as the one that killed Wheldon.

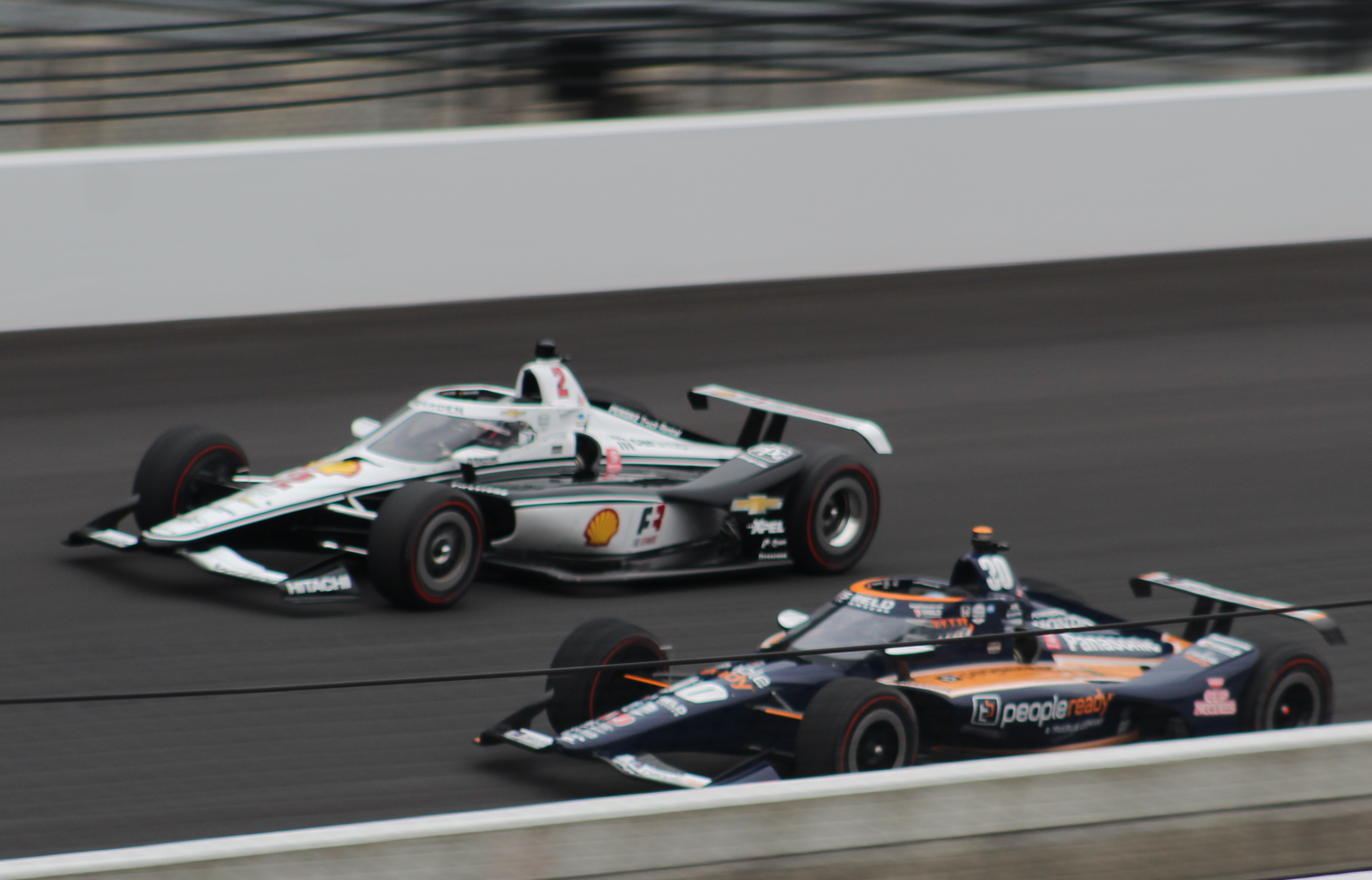
Dallara DW12 with Universal Aero Kit (UAK)

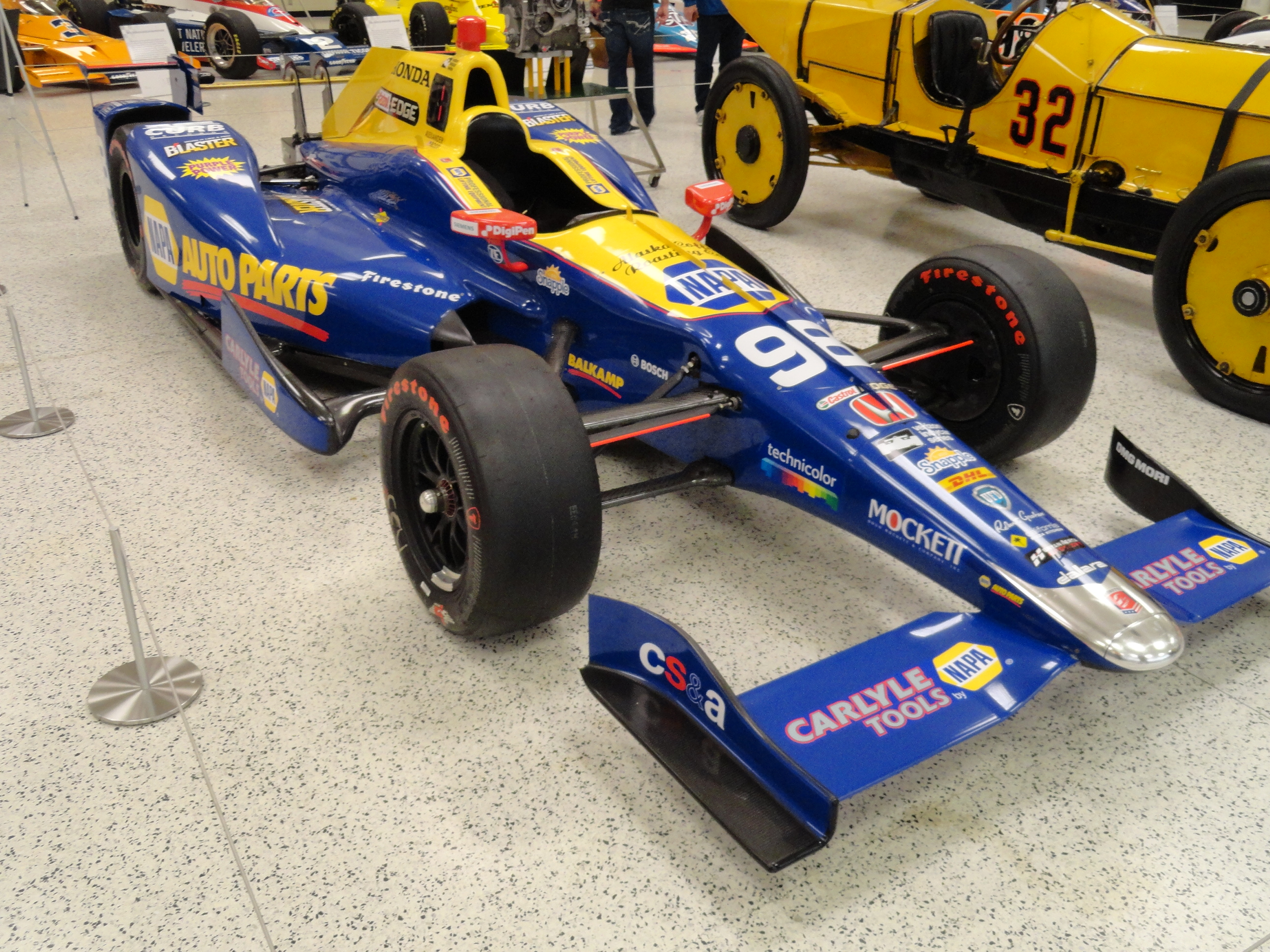
Dallara DW12 on display at the Indianapolis Motor Speedway Museum in 2017

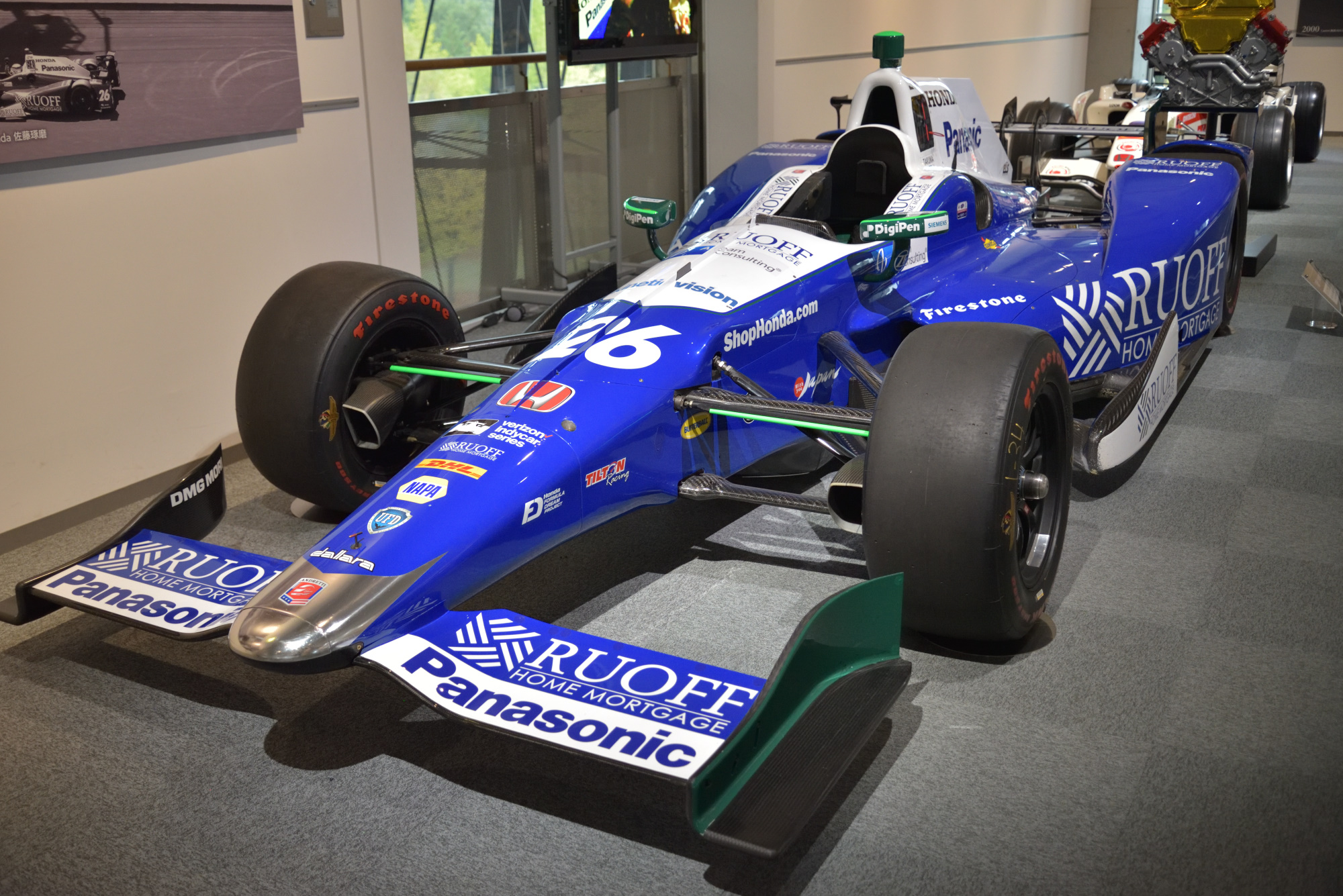
Takuma Sato's 2017 Indianapolis 500-winning car

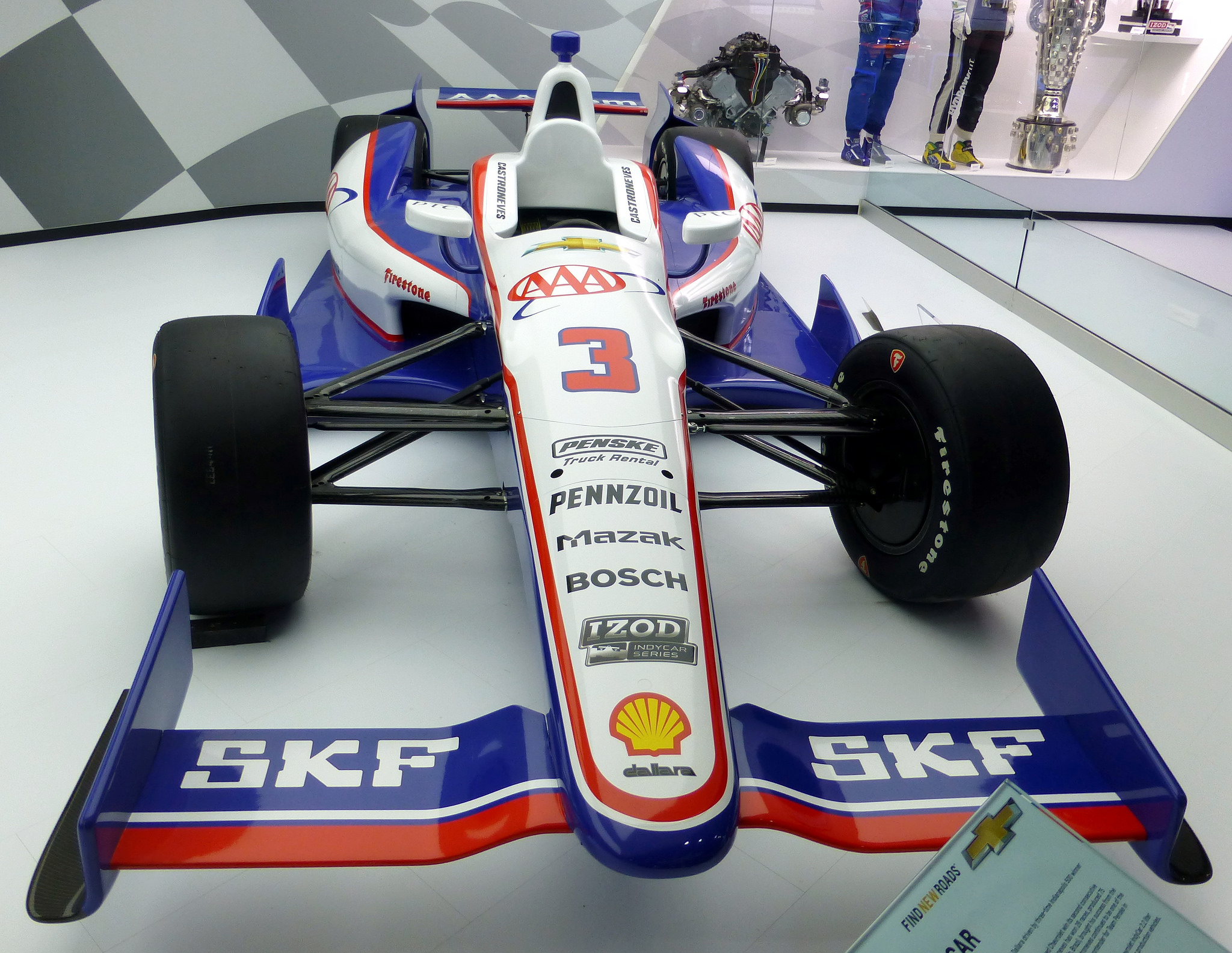
Helio Castroneves' DW12 chassis on display

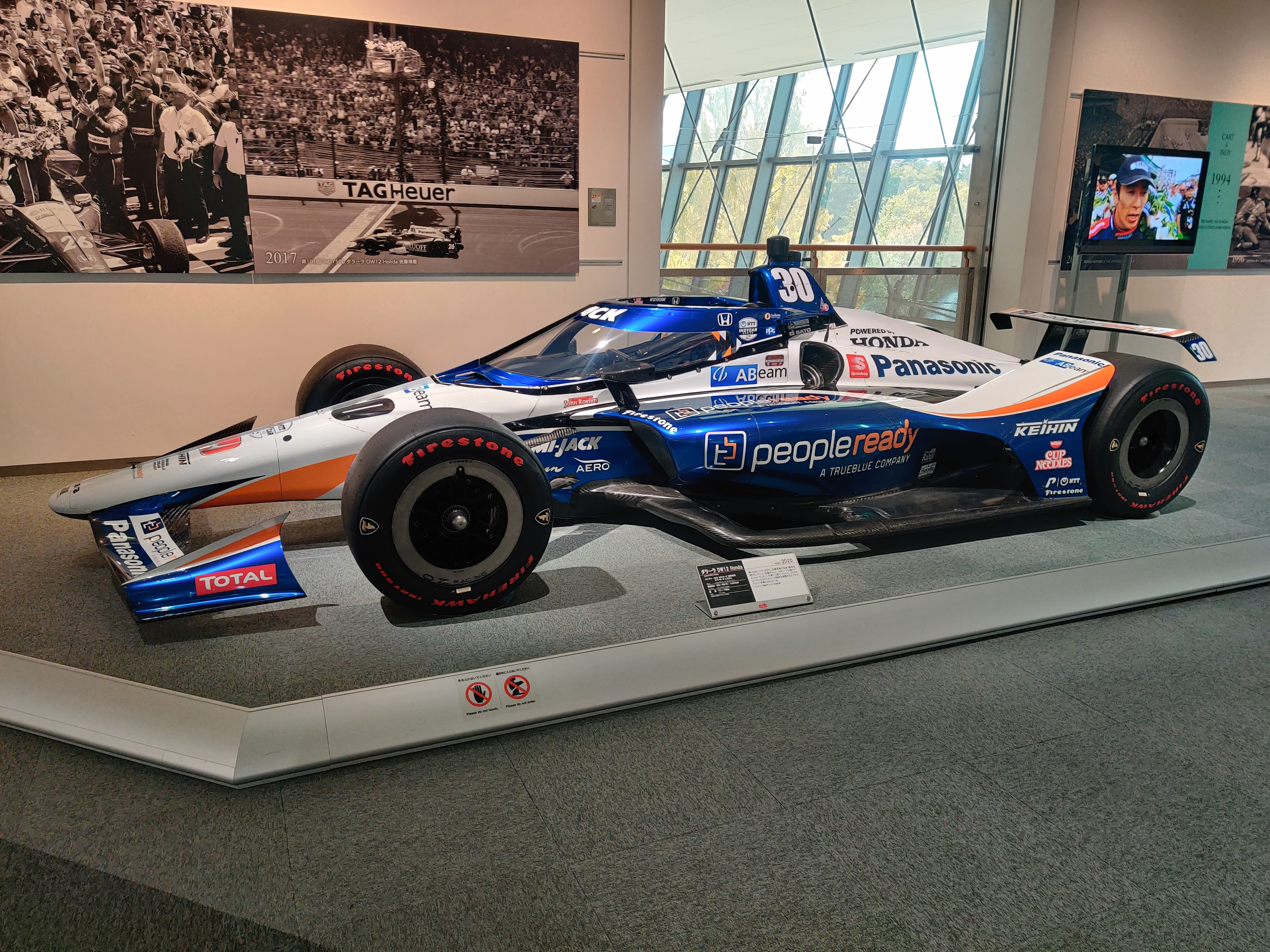
Takuma Sato's 2020 Indianapolis 500-winning car on display at Honda Collection Hall

== Other formulas ==
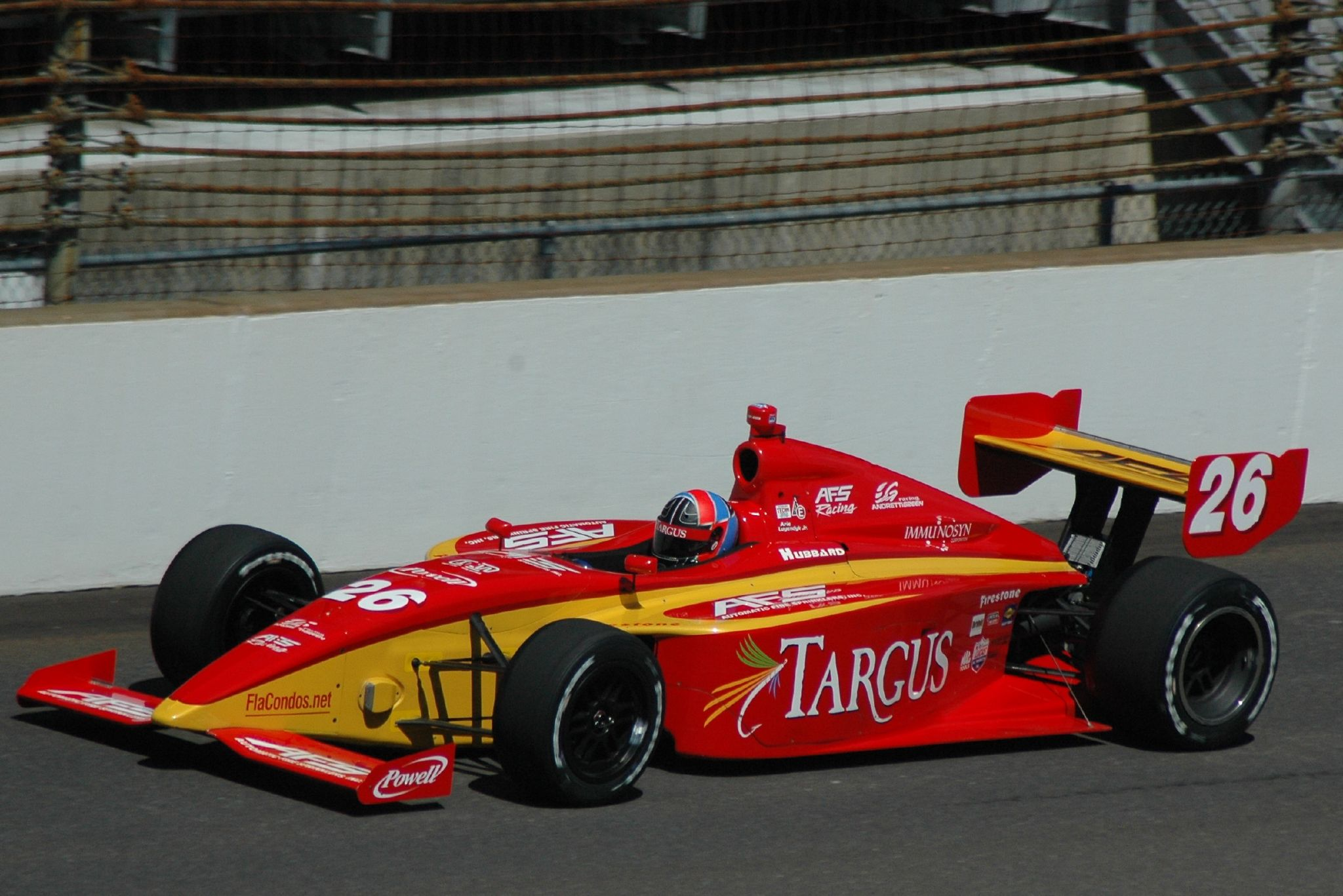
A Dallara Indy Lights car practicing at Indianapolis.

In 2002, Dallara became the exclusive supplier for World Series by Nissan, a move that allowed them to gain the contract for the World Series by Renault in 2004. Dallara was also appointed by the FIA to be the sole chassis builder, partner and supplier of the FIA Formula 2 Championship (formerly GP2 Series) and the new FIA Formula 3 Championship (formerly GP3 Series), giving them a near-monopoly of every motorsport series used as a direct entry point into F1.

In 2007 Dallara created a new car model, known as the Formulino ("little formula"), in order to fill the gap between karts and Formula Three. The first series to use the new concept was the ADAC Formel Masters in 2008, and the MRF Challenge also adopted the car.

Dallara has provided the spec chassis to the Indy NXT series, formerly the Indy Lights Series since 2002. For the 2015 Indy Lights season, the car was replaced by the new generation Dallara IL-15, powered by Mazda's 2.0-litre turbocharged MZR-R four-cylinder engine.

Dallara also designed the chassis for the Japanese Super Formula series, formerly known as Formula Nippon, called the Dallara SF19. This update to the previous chassis (the Dallara SF14) followed the FIA's new safety guidelines and added the "halo."

== Endurance car racing ==
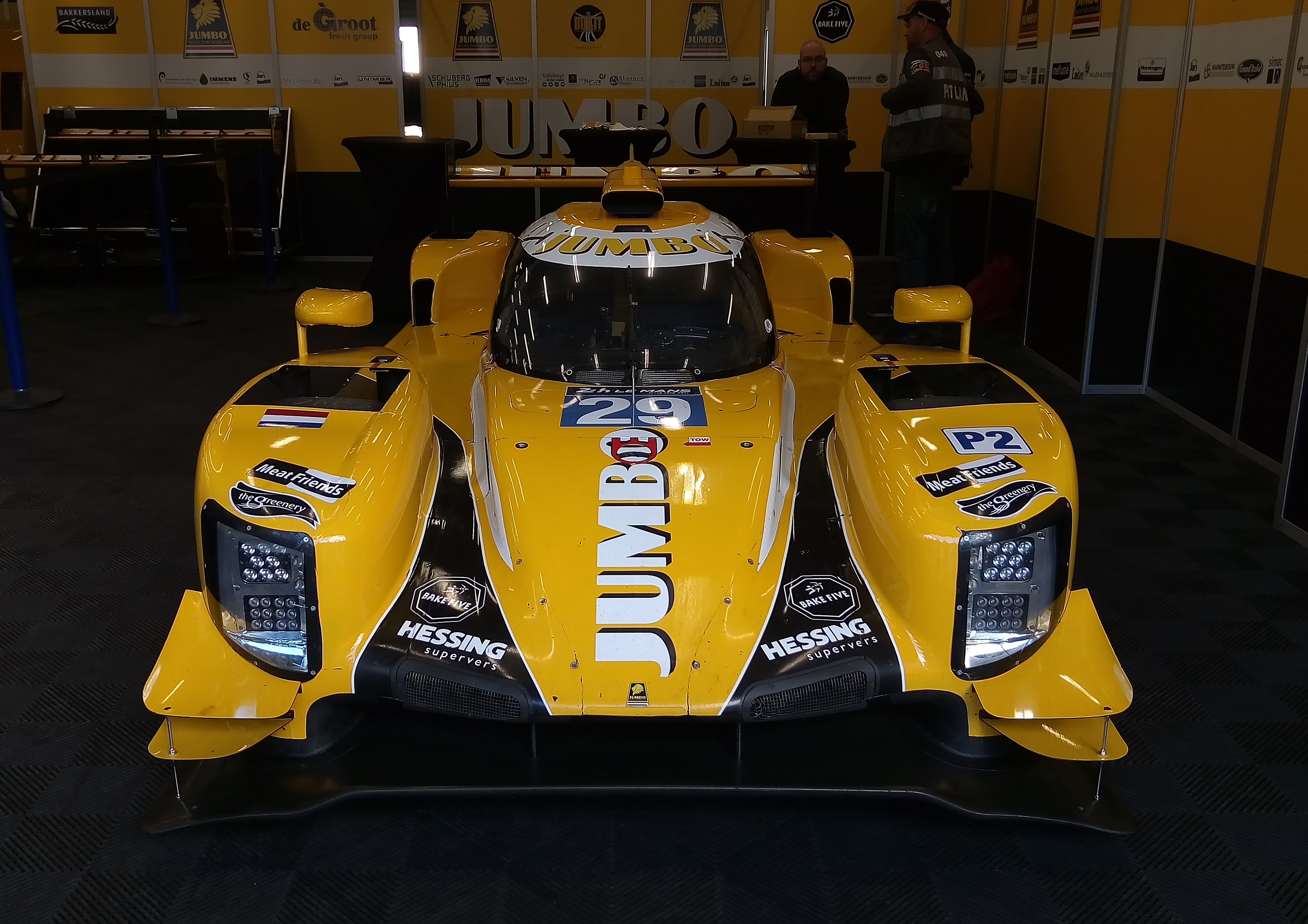
Racing Team Nederland's Dallara P217 LMP Prototype raced by Jan Lammers and Frits van Eerd in the 2017 4 Hours of Spa.

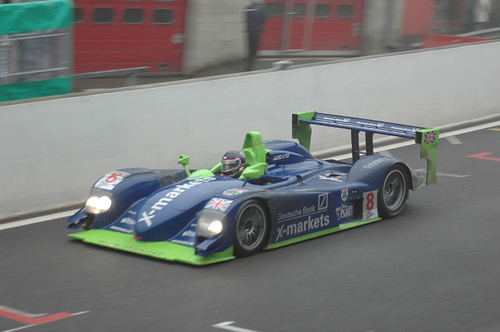
Rollcentre Racing's Dallara SP1 (ex-Chrysler/Oreca) at the 2005 1000km of Spa.

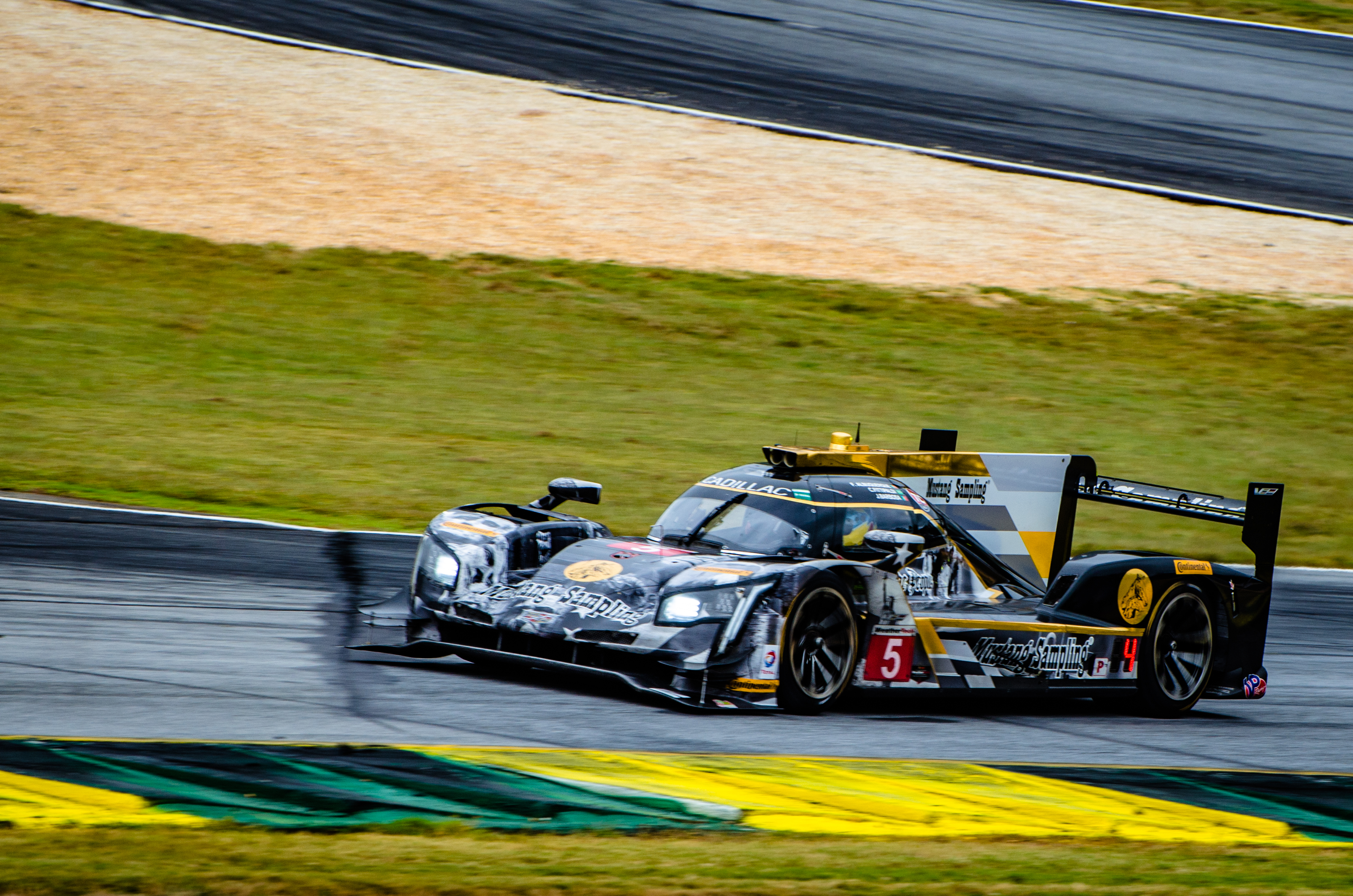
Action Express Racing's Mustang Sampling Racing Cadillac DPi- V.R. at the Petit Le Mans.

In the early 1980s, Dallara was responsible for the construction of the Lancia LC1 Group 6 prototype as well as the later LC2 Group C car, along with Lancia's partner Abarth. It would not be until 1993 that Dallara returned to endurance racing, although very few chassis would take their name. The first project was the Ferrari 333 SP, made for the new WSC regulations in the IMSA GT Championship. The 333 SP, manufactured at Michelotto, won a great number of races both in North America and Europe. Ferrari also hired Dallara to develop the racing version of the Ferrari F50, the F50 GT, financed by French racing driver Fabien Giroix, but the project was aborted before it got off the ground, in 1998.

As a consequence, the company secured other contracts and built chassis for Toyota (GT-One), Audi (various incarnations of the R8) and Chrysler (the Oreca-run Chrysler LMP). Later, the Chrysler LMP would become Dallara's customer car available to privateers, known as the Dallara SP1, which has also served as a test mule for Nissan's aborted return to the 24 Hours of Le Mans. All these cars were competitive in prototype sports car racing, with the Audi R8, in particular, becoming the most dominant chassis in modern times at the 24 Hours and the American Le Mans Series. In 2002, they built the GC21 for use in the Fuji Grand Champion Series; the car was based on the company's F3 cars.

In March 2008 the first Dallara Daytona Prototype appeared, built-in collaboration with Doran for Wayne Taylor's SunTrust Racing team.

In 2015, Dallara was named as one of four constructors for the LMP2 and DPi class regulations to debut in 2017, using its Dallara P217 chassis. In 2021, Dallara was named as one of four chassis suppliers for the LMDh sports prototype class, and currently supply BMW with their M Hybrid V8, Cadillac with their V-Series.R. and McLaren with their MCL-HY. Although not an LMDh design, Dallara produce the chassis for the Ferrari 499P.

== Other notable cars ==
In 2007, Dallara and KTM produced the KTM X-Bow, a sports car with two seats, which was launched at the Geneva Motor Show in 2008.

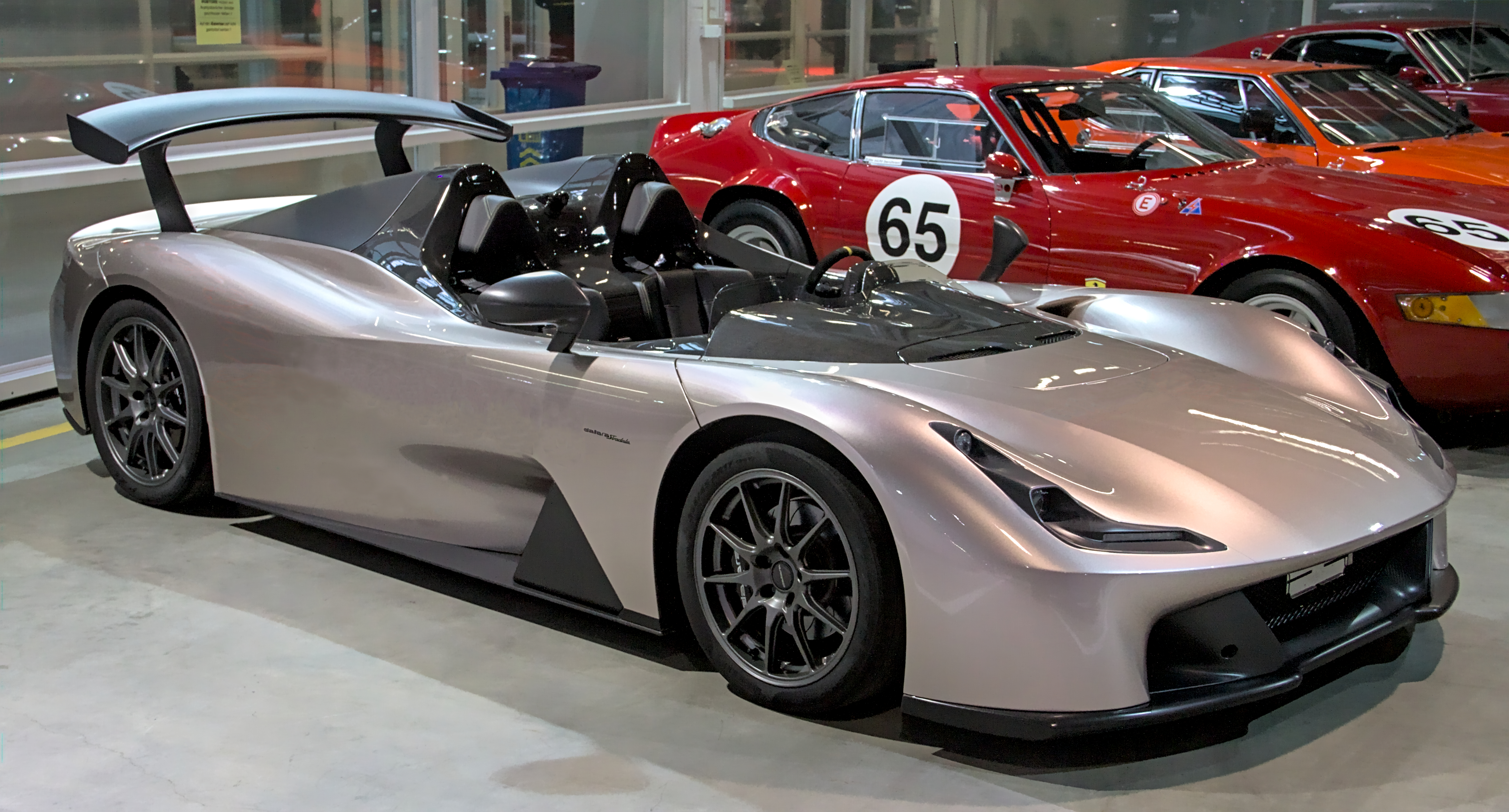
Dallara Stradale

Dallara also provided engineering services for Renault (R.S. 01), Alfa Romeo (8C and 4C), Bugatti (Veyron and Chiron), Maserati (MC12 and MC20), and Lamborghini (motorsport variants of the Huracán)

In 2017, Dallara showed its first road car, the Stradale, on the occasion of Giampaolo Dallara's 81st birthday.

== Handbikes ==
Dallara also produces handbikes, under Z-Bike. They also designed a handbike for Alex Zanardi for the Men's Para-cycling at the Paralympics, leading Zanardi to win 4 gold and 2 silver medals at the 2012 and 2016 Paralympics respectively.

== Aerospace ==
For the Rosetta probe, Dallara designed the drill that is part of the Philae robotic lander. Dallara has also partnered with Raytheon to provide the MALD for the United States Air Force.

== Complete Formula One World Championship results ==
(key) (results in bold indicate pole position)

Year	Entrant	Chassis	Engine	Tyres	Drivers	1	2	3	4	5	6	7	8	9	10	11	12	13	14	15	16	Points	WCC
1988	BMS Scuderia Italia	3087; F188	Ford DFR 3.5 V8	G		BRA	SMR	MON	MEX	CAN	DET	FRA	GBR	GER	HUN	BEL	ITA	POR	ESP	JPN	AUS	0	NC
1988	BMS Scuderia Italia	3087; F188	Ford DFR 3.5 V8	G	(Italy) Alex Caffi	DNPQ	Ret	Ret	Ret	DNPQ	8	12	11	15	Ret	8	Ret	7	10	Ret	Ret	0	NC
1989	BMS Scuderia Italia	F189	Ford DFR 3.5 V8	P		BRA	SMR	MON	MEX	USA	CAN	FRA	GBR	GER	HUN	BEL	ITA	POR	ESP	JPN	AUS	8	8th
1989	BMS Scuderia Italia	F189	Ford DFR 3.5 V8	P	(Italy) Alex Caffi	DNPQ	7	4	13	Ret	6	Ret	DNPQ	Ret	7	Ret	11	Ret	Ret	9	Ret	8	8th
1989	BMS Scuderia Italia	F189	Ford DFR 3.5 V8	P	(Italy) Andrea de Cesaris	13	10	13	Ret	8	3	DNQ	Ret	7	Ret	11	Ret	Ret	7	10	Ret	8	8th
1990	BMS Scuderia Italia	F190	Ford DFR 3.5 V8	P		USA	BRA	SMR	MON	CAN	MEX	FRA	GBR	GER	HUN	BEL	ITA	POR	ESP	JPN	AUS	0	NC
1990	BMS Scuderia Italia	F190	Ford DFR 3.5 V8	P	(Italy) Emanuele Pirro			Ret	Ret	Ret	Ret	Ret	11	Ret	10	Ret	Ret	15	Ret	Ret	Ret	0	NC
1990	BMS Scuderia Italia	F190	Ford DFR 3.5 V8	P	(Italy) Andrea de Cesaris	Ret	Ret	Ret	Ret	Ret	13	DSQ	Ret	DNQ	Ret	Ret	10	Ret	Ret	Ret	Ret	0	NC
1990	BMS Scuderia Italia	F190	Ford DFR 3.5 V8	P	(Italy) Gianni Morbidelli	DNQ	14															0	NC
1991	BMS Scuderia Italia	F191	Judd GV 3.5 V10	P		USA	BRA	SMR	MON	CAN	MEX	FRA	GBR	GER	HUN	BEL	ITA	POR	ESP	JPN	AUS	5	8th
1991	BMS Scuderia Italia	F191	Judd GV 3.5 V10	P	(Italy) Emanuele Pirro	Ret	11	DNPQ	6	9	DNPQ	DNPQ	10	10	Ret	8	10	Ret	15	Ret	7	5	8th
1991	BMS Scuderia Italia	F191	Judd GV 3.5 V10	P	(Finland) JJ Lehto	Ret	Ret	3	11	Ret	Ret	Ret	13	Ret	Ret	Ret	Ret	Ret	8	Ret	12	5	8th
1992	BMS Scuderia Italia	F192	Ferrari; 037 3.5 V12	G		RSA	MEX	BRA	ESP	SMR	MON	CAN	FRA	GBR	GER	HUN	BEL	ITA	POR	JPN	AUS	2	10th
1992	BMS Scuderia Italia	F192	Ferrari; 037 3.5 V12	G	(Finland) JJ Lehto	Ret	8	8	Ret	11	9	9	9	13	10	DNQ	7	11	Ret	9	Ret	2	10th
1992	BMS Scuderia Italia	F192	Ferrari; 037 3.5 V12	G	(Italy) Pierluigi Martini	Ret	Ret	Ret	6	6	Ret	8	10	15	11	Ret	Ret	8	Ret	10	Ret	2	10th

== See also ==
- List of Dallara cars
