= Dallara Stradale =

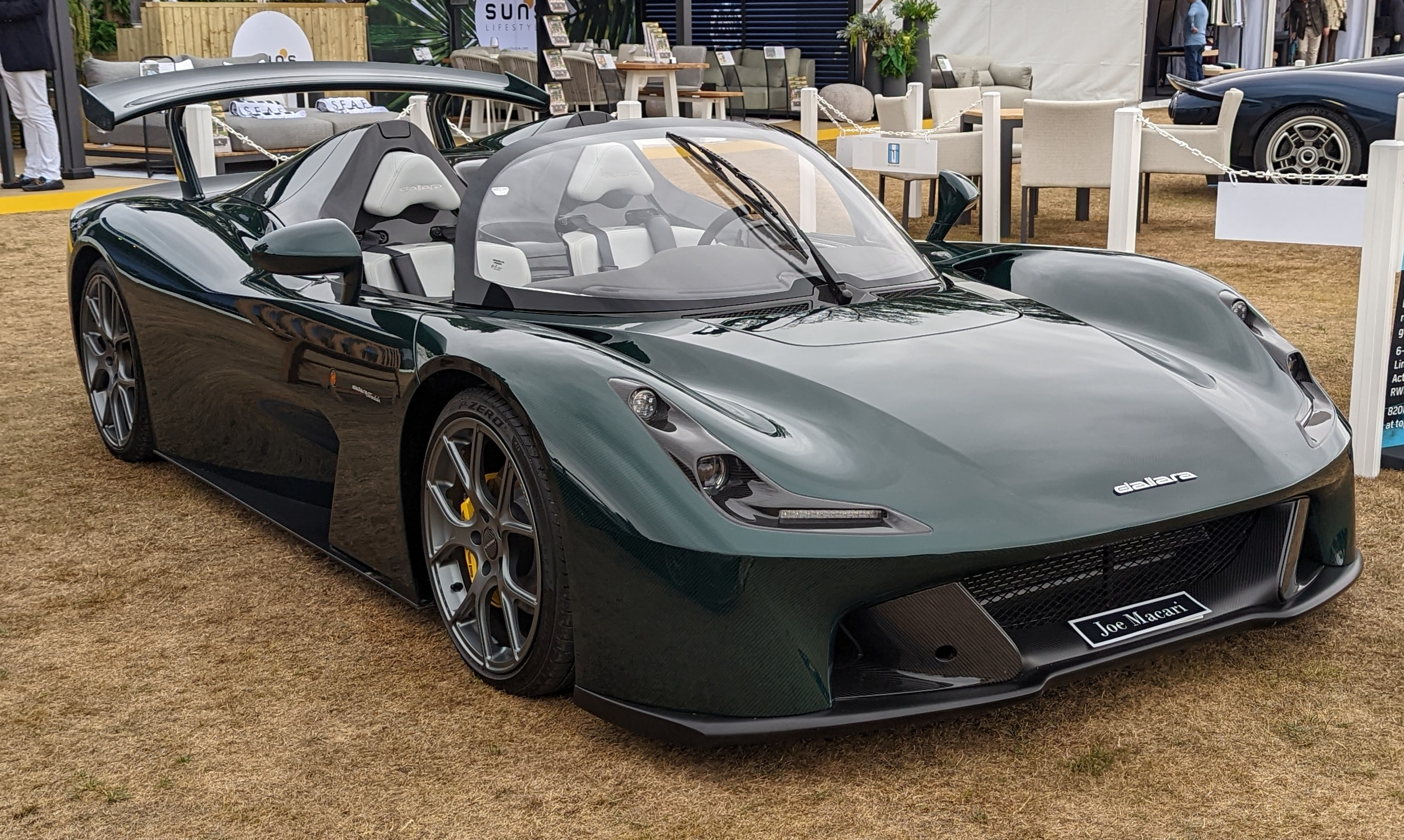

Overview
- Manufacturer: Dallara Automobili
- Production: 2017–present
- Assembly: Varano de' Melegari, Italy
- Designer: Granstudio under Lowie Vermeersch

Body and chassis
- Class: Sports car (S)
- Body style: 2-door berlinetta; Doorless roadster; Doorless targa top; Doorless barchetta
- Layout: Transverse rear mid-engine, rear-wheel-drive

Powertrain
- Engine: 2.3-litre turbocharged Ford EcoBoost I4
- Transmission: 6-speed MMT6 B6 manual; 6-speed automated manual

Dimensions
- Wheelbase: 2,475 mm (97.4 in)
- Length: 4,185 mm (164.8 in)
- Width: 1,875 mm (73.8 in)
- Height: 1,041 mm (41.0 in)
- Kerb weight: 855 kg (1,885 lb) (dry weight)

The Dallara Stradale is a sports car manufactured by Italian automotive manufacturer Dallara. The Stradale is the first road car manufactured by the company, the company's main products being chassis development for other automobile manufacturers along with the development and construction of race cars. The Stradale is a barchetta in its basic form, with no doors, but is convertible to berlinetta, roadster and targa top body styles after the installation of interchangeable parts.

== History and development ==
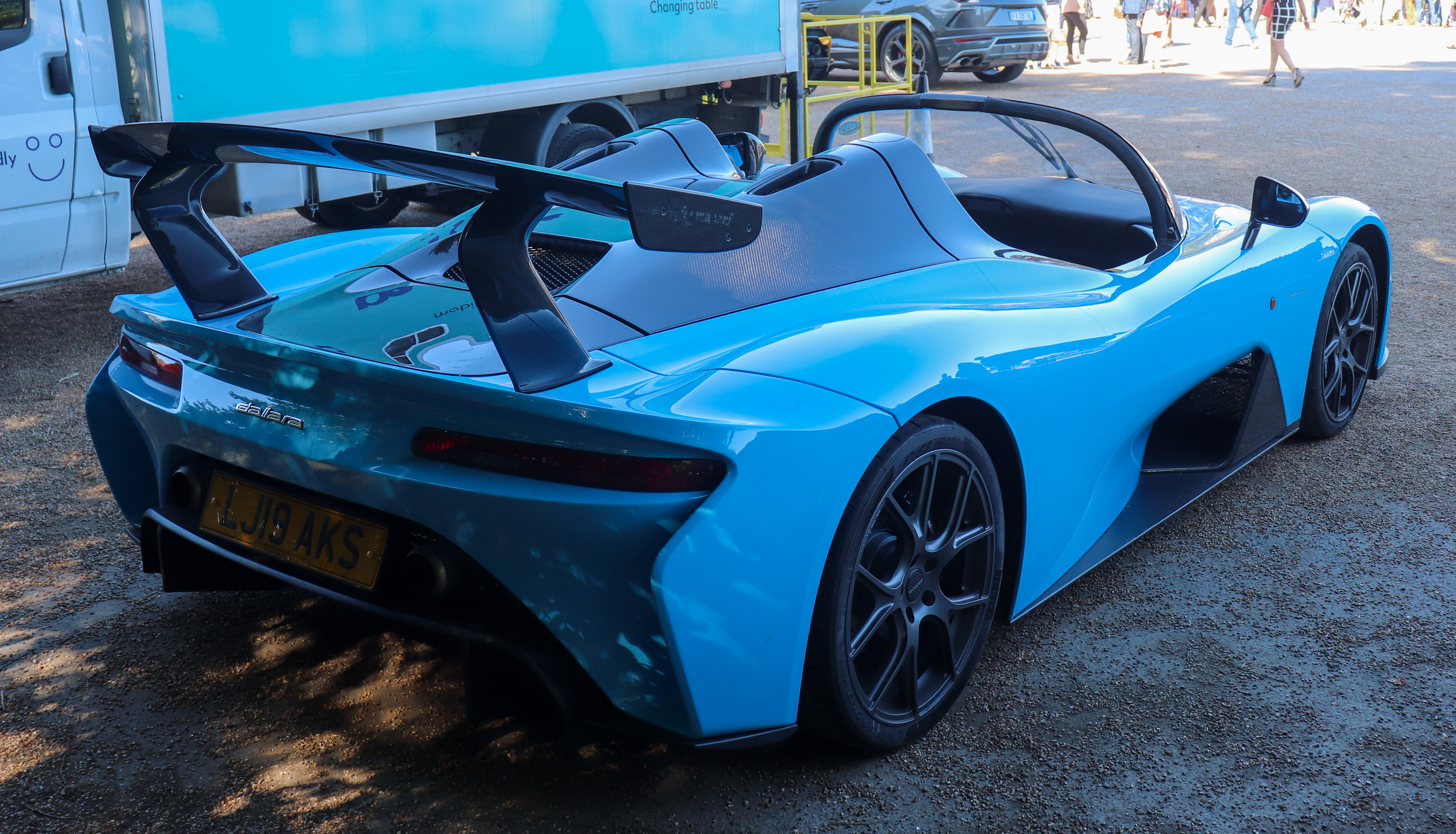
Rear view

Company founder Giampaolo Dallara had the desire to create a car bearing his own name after having worked with various manufacturers and overseeing their projects ranging from the development of Formula 1 and Formula 3 cars as well as Indycars and even designing the chassis of sports cars for other manufacturers, notable manufacturers include Ferrari, Lamborghini, McLaren and Alfa Romeo. The development of such a car was halted six times as the funds received from the completion of projects of other companies were invested in the development of other projects but finally, after accumulating enough funds for the development of a road car, the CEO of the company, Andrea Pontremoli was tasked with the development work.

Development began in 2015 with design work contracted to Granstudio, a small Italian design consultancy firm located in Turin. Hours of wind tunnel testing was performed on the final mockups in order to ensure that the car was aerodynamically refined. Chassis work was undertaken by former race car driver Loris Bicocchi.

Dallara had been inspired by Colin Chapman's philosophy of lightweight minimalist sports cars and the final product, the Stradale embodied those principles. With a dry weight of 855 kg (1,885 lb), the Stradale has performance comparable to high performance sports cars while being driver-focused.

The first car was delivered to Dallara himself, on the occasion of his 81st birthday, at the company's headquarters in Varano de' Melegari, Italy, in 2017.

== Specifications ==
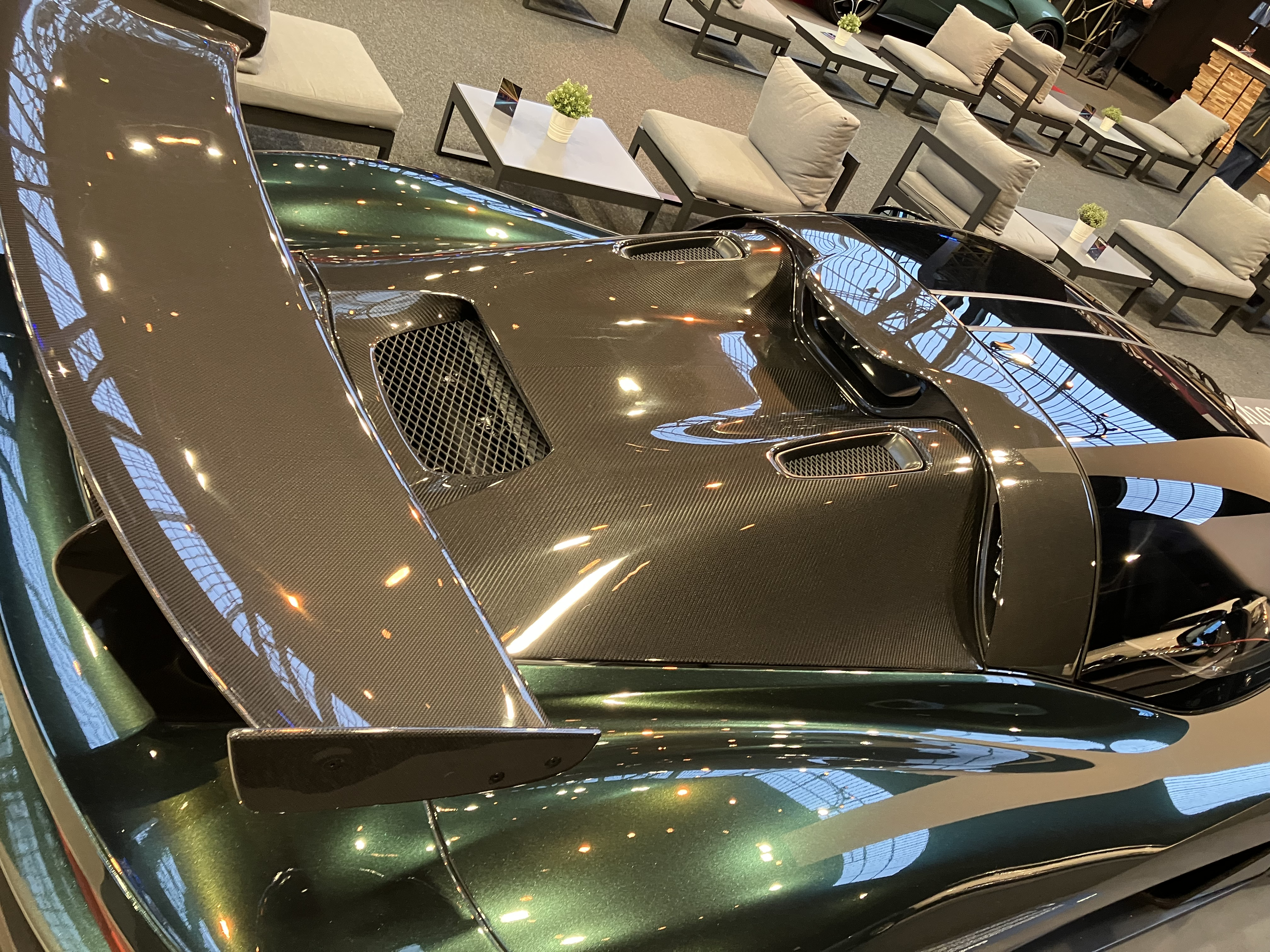
Carbon fiber engine cover

The Stradale is powered by a 2.3-litre turbocharged Ford EcoBoost Inline-four engine also used in the Ford Focus RS. The engine is reworked by Bosch in order to generate a maximum power output of 400 PS (294 kW; 395 hp) at 6,200 rpm and a peak torque of 500 N⋅m (369 lb⋅ft) at 3,000–5,000 rpm. Bosch also worked on the car's aerodynamics and as a result, the car in the berlinetta body style is able to generate 820 kg (1,808 lb) of downforce with its optional rear wing.

The conversion to different body styles was made possible by a removable windscreen made from motorsport grade polycarbonate glass and a carbon fibre frame. The windscreen has a shape and a central windscreen wiper reminiscent of the Group C race cars of the 1990s. A T-shape removable frame combined with detachable gull-wing doors makes the conversion to a Targa top and Berlinetta bodyshell possible, but the driver enters the car in the same way, regardless of body structure (i.e by climbing over the side).

The base of the chassis is a hollow carbon-fibre tub with a solid carbon fibre side structure in order to channel air to the rear of the car. The air from one side goes to the engine while the air from the other side goes to the air-to-air intercooler. The carbon tub is joined by aluminium sub-structures front and aft. Two control arms are present at each corner, with the front arms directly mounted on the tub. The floor of the chassis is flat with a front splitter mounted at the front and a rear diffuser mounted at the rear. These elements combined without the optional rear wing create so much downforce that the format of the car requires it to be fitted with reverse Gurney flaps that help maintain appropriate aerodynamic balance.

The engine is transversely mounted and is combined with a 6-speed manual transmission (also from the Focus RS) or an optional 6-speed automated manual transmission with paddle-shifters mounted on the steering column transferring the power of the engine to the rear wheels. Both of the transmissions come with a Quaife limited-slip differential. The Stradale comes with electronic stability control as standard that can be turned off and set to intervene as minimum as possible. The braking system utilises steel brake discs as the engineers working on the car believed that steel brake discs worked just as well without the added complexity and cost of a carbon-ceramic brake disc. The brake calipers are supplied by Brembo.

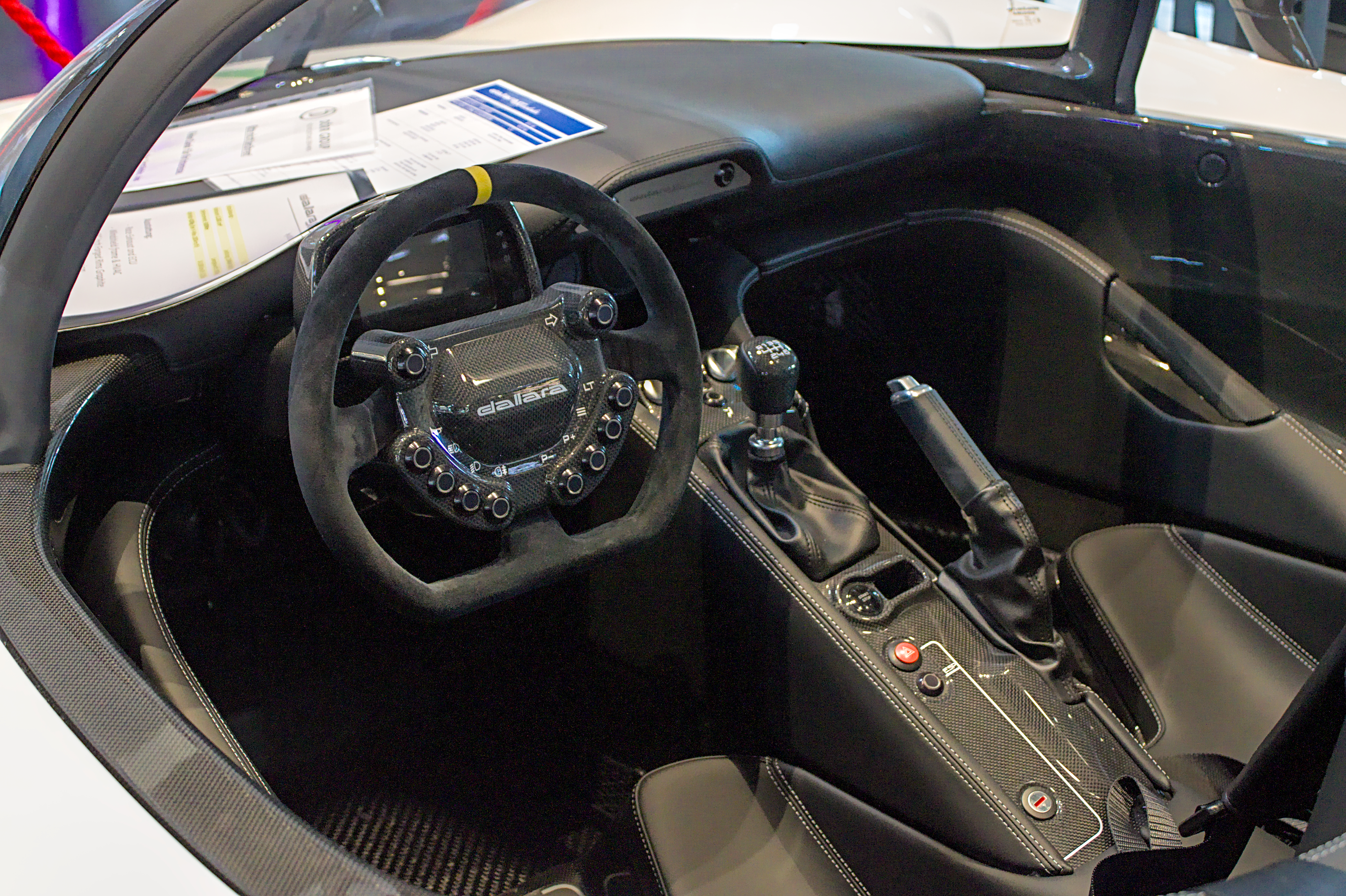
Interior

The interior of the car has carbon fibre as its main element and has all of the main controls of the car integrated into the steering wheel. Vital information of the car such as speed and rpm are displayed on a motorsports-style display screen on the steering column. The seats are carbon-fibre shells fixed to the chassis and have foam padding applied on them. The steering column and paddles are adjustable in order to alter the driving position. Minimal luggage can be stowed in two compartments located behind the engine and two additional compartments in the seats are designed to store two race helmets. The total space of these compartments is four cubic feet.

Other features of the car include Pirelli Trofeo R tyres, active racing suspension system by Tractive suspension which drops the car's ride height by 0.8-inches in track mode and an oil pressure accumulator enabling the fuel pump to withstand the 2.0 g of lateral acceleration the chassis is capable of generating.

== Performance ==
The Stradale can generate a downforce of 400 kg (881 lb) at 241 km/h (150 mph) in its basic form and 853 kg (1,880 lb) with its optional rear wing. The car accelerates from 0–97 km/h (0–60 mph) in 3.2 seconds, 0–161 km/h (0–100 mph) in 8.1 seconds, can complete a quarter-mile in 11.4 seconds and can attain a top speed of 280 km/h (174 mph).

== Production ==
The company plans to produce no more than 600 units of the Stradale in five years offering a limited number of units for sale every year. In 2018, each car had a cost of €191,000 (US$236,000) before taxes.

== Dallara EXP ==
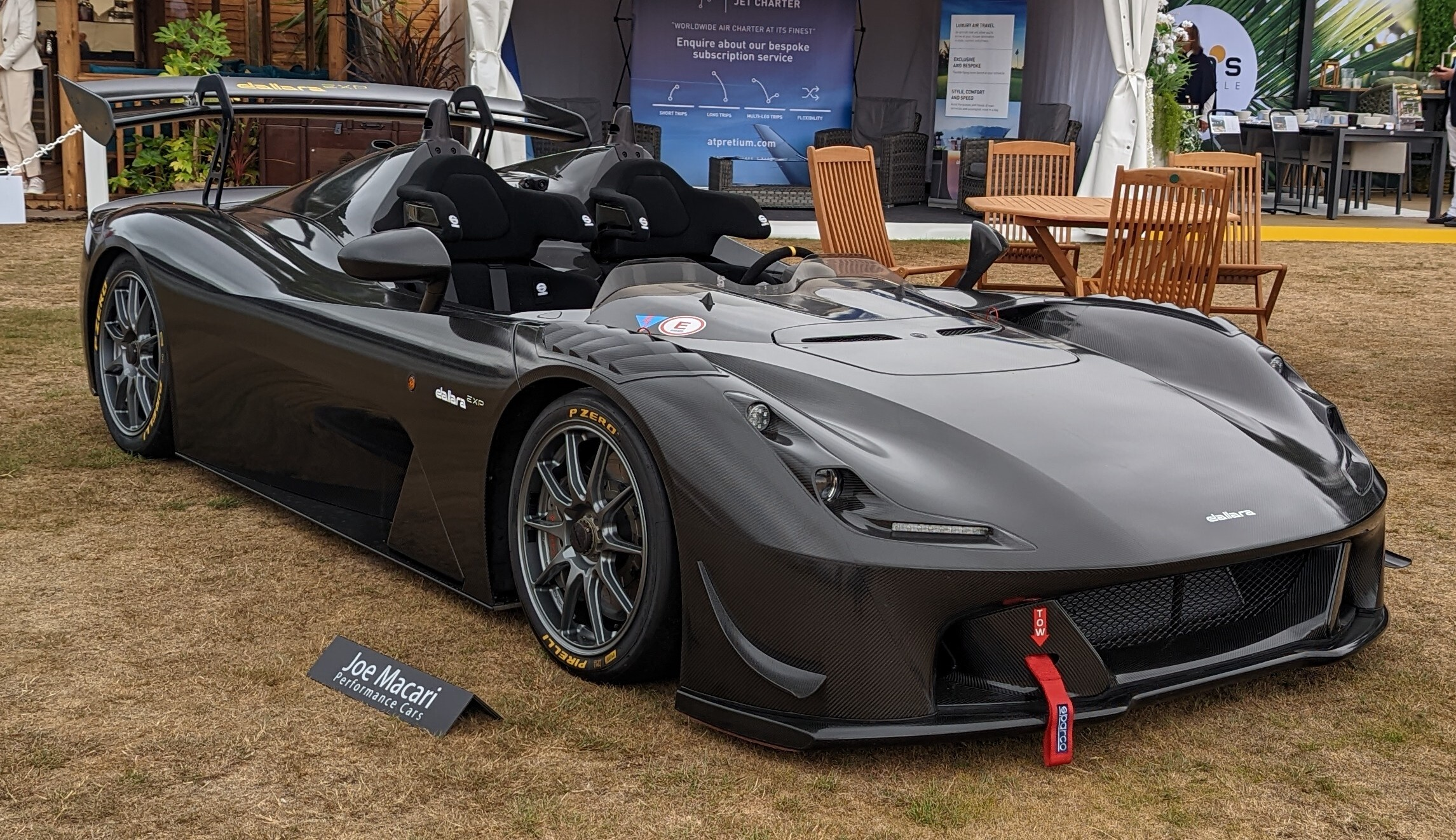
EXP

In July 2021, Dallara introduced the EXP, a track-only version of the Stradale. It uses the same carbon-fiber monocoque as the road car, but changes have been made to the carbon bodywork to improve aerodynamics on track. It still retains its body modularity. The roof and windshield have been removed and a large rear spoiler and front dive planes have been added to increase grip. This allows the car to make 1,250 kg (2,755 lb) of downforce at a top speed of 286 km/h (178 mph) and a 0–100 km/h (0–62 mph) in 3.2 seconds. Like the Stradale, the Dallara EXP is powered by a Bosch-modified 2.3-liter EcoBoost four-cylinder engine borrowed from the Focus RS. Output has been raised to 500 PS (368 kW; 493 hp) and 700 N⋅m (516 lb⋅ft) of torque. The car's dry weight is 890 kg (1,962 lb). Unlike the street version, the track-only version is only available with a six-speed sequential manual gearbox and a Quaife limited-slip differential.
