= List of A1 Grand Prix drivers =

This is a complete list of drivers who raced in the A1 Grand Prix series, from its inception in 2005–06 until its final season in 2008–09.

Over the series' 39 rounds (totaling 78 races), 134 different drivers entered at least one A1 Grand Prix race. Switzerland's Neel Jani holds the records for most rounds entered (30), most race starts (60), total wins (10), and points (413). Jani is tied with Nico Hülkenberg for most feature race wins (6), and with Alexandre Prémat and Jonny Reid for most sprint race wins (4).

A1 Grand Prix pointscoring systems varied according to seasons. If necessary, a small flag indicates the nationality of the driver if it is different from the associated A1 Team.

== List of drivers ==
List of A1 Grand Prix drivers
Name	Team	Seasons	Races (Starts)	Wins	Sprint wins	Feature wins	2nd	3rd	Poles	Fastest Laps	Points
Chris Alajajian ( (Australia) )	Lebanon	2007–08	5 (10)								0
Filipe Albuquerque	Portugal	2007–08, 2008–09	11 (22)	1		1	4	4		1	147
Mikhail Aleshin	Russia	2005–06	1 (2)								0
Nur Ali	Pakistan	2006–07	11 (22)								1
Zahir Ali	Indonesia	2008–09	2 (4)								3
Michael Ammermüller	Germany	2007–08, 2008–09	9 (16)	1	1				1		41
Marco Andretti	United States	2008–09	5 (10)					1			16
Jimmy Auby ( (South Africa) )	Lebanon	2007–08	2 (4)								0
Earl Bamber	New Zealand	2008–09	5 (10)				1	2			30
Khalil Beschir	Lebanon	2005–06, 2006–07, 2007–08	10 (20)								0
Jeroen Bleekemolen	Netherlands	2006–07, 2007–08, 2008–09	24 (47)	2	2		2	1	4		218
Ryan Briscoe	Australia	2005–06, 2006–07	5 (10)					2			24
Sébastien Buemi	Switzerland	2006–07	4 (8)								25
Massimiliano Busnelli	Italy	2005–06	2 (4)								0
César Campaniço	Portugal	2005–06	1 (2)								0
Patrick Carpentier	Canada	2005–06	3 (6)								16
Adam Carroll	(Republic of Ireland) Ireland	2007–08, 2008–09	17 (32)	6	3	3	3	3	4	6	188
Karun Chandhok	India	2005–06	2 (3)								0
Jan Charouz	Czech Republic	2005–06, 2006–07	2 (4)								0
Congfu Cheng	China	2006–07, 2007–08	18 (36)					1		4	64
Dan Clarke	(United Kingdom) Great Britain	2008–09	3 (6)								8
Jonathan Cochet	France	2007–08	1 (2)								0
Will Davison	Australia	2005–06	5 (10)								13
Michael Devaney	(Republic of Ireland) Ireland	2005–06, 2006–07	7 (14)								16
Luis Díaz	Mexico	2005–06	1 (2)								0
Robert Doornbos	Netherlands	2008–09	3 (5)	1	1		1	1	1	1	31
Salvador Durán	Mexico	2005–06, 2006–07, 2007–08, 2008–09	22 (42)	2	1	1	3	5	1	2	126
Loïc Duval	France	2006–07, 2007–08, 2008–09	13 (26)	2	1	1	9	4	2	2	167
Ian Dyk	Australia	2005–06, 2007–08	7 (14)					1			9
Armaan Ebrahim	India	2005–06	11 (22)								0
Tomáš Enge	Czech Republic	2005–06, 2006–07, 2007–08	19 (38)	1		1	1	2			86
Fairuz Fauzy	Malaysia	2005–06, 2007–08, 2008–09	12 (22)	1	1		1	1	1	1	57
Marcel Fässler	Switzerland	2006–07	1 (2)								0
Ralph Firman	(Republic of Ireland) Ireland	2005–06, 2007–08	9 (18)					1		2	61
Christian Fittipaldi	Brazil	2005–06	4 (8)								8
Patrick Friesacher	Austria	2005–06	1 (2)								3
Ryo Fukuda	Japan	2005–06	1 (2)								3
Juan Pablo García	Mexico	2006–07	1 (2)								0
David Garza	Mexico	2007–08, 2008–09	7 (14)								5
Phil Giebler	United States	2005–06, 2006–07	10 (20)				1				27
Jorge Goeters	Mexico	2007–08	1 (2)								0
Felipe Guimarães	Brazil	2008–09	7 (11)				1				18
Matthew Halliday	New Zealand	2005–06, 2006–07	13 (26)					3			103
Satrio Hermanto	Indonesia	2007–08, 2008–09	15 (30)								1
Bryan Herta	United States	2005–06	3 (6)								13
J.R. Hildebrand	United States	2008–09	1 (2)								5
James Hinchcliffe	Canada	2006–07, 2007–08	10 (20)				1			1	22
Nico Hülkenberg	Germany	2006–07	10 (20)	9	3	6	3	2	3	3	126
Ryan Hunter-Reay	United States	2006–07	1 (2)								1
Jin-woo Hwang	(South Korea) Korea	2008–09	3 (4)								4
Neel Jani	Switzerland	2005–06, 2006–07, 2007–08, 2008–09	30 (60)	10	4	6	9	11	10	8	413
Erik Janiš	Czech Republic	2007–08	3 (6)								1
Jaroslav Janiš	Czech Republic	2006–07	2 (4)								4
Oliver Jarvis	(United Kingdom) Great Britain	2006–07, 2007–08	7 (14)	2		2	5			2	24
Jiang Tengyi	China	2005–06	10 (20)								6
Sérgio Jimenez	Brazil	2007–08	6 (12)					1			38
Christian Jones	Australia	2005–06	2 (4)								0
Michel Jourdain, Jr.	Mexico	2007–08	2 (4)								0
Bruno Junqueira	Brazil	2006–07, 2007–08	5 (10)								10
Takis Kaitatzis	Greece	2006–07	2 (3)								0
Narain Karthikeyan	India	2006–07, 2007–08, 2008–09	20 (40)	2		2	1		1		93
Robbie Kerr	(United Kingdom) Great Britain	2005–06, 2006–07, 2007–08	23 (46)	3	3		11	4	4	2	154
Adam Khan	Pakistan	2005–06, 2007–08	17 (34)								11
Alexander Khateeb ( (United Kingdom) )	Lebanon	2006–07	2 (4)								0
Allam Khodair ( (Brazil) )	Lebanon	2006–07	4 (8)								0
Charlie Kimball	United States	2008–09	1 (2)							1	3
Tomáš Kostka	Czech Republic	2006–07	1 (2)								0
Josef Král	Czech Republic	2007–08	1 (2)								0
Nicolas Lapierre	France	2005–06, 2006–07, 2007–08	11 (22)	6	3	3	1	4	2	2	117
Mathias Lauda	Austria	2005–06	10 (20)								11
Denis Lian	Singapore	2006–07	1 (2)								0
Aaron Lim	Malaysia	2008–09	1 (2)								0
Vitantonio Liuzzi	Italy	2008–09	2 (4)						1		7
André Lotterer	Germany	2008–09	1 (2)								2
Richard Lyons	(Republic of Ireland) Ireland	2006–07	7 (14)								7
Qinghua Ma	China	2005–06	1 (2)								0
Darren Manning	(United Kingdom) Great Britain	2005–06, 2006–07	2 (4)				1				15
Marcus Marshall	Australia	2005–06	1 (2)					1			8
John Martin	Australia	2007–08, 2008–09	13 (26)							1	54
David Martínez	Mexico	2005–06, 2007–08	3 (6)								4
Raphael Matos	Brazil	2006–07	3 (6)								5
Sean McIntosh	Canada	2005–06, 2006–07	12 (24)	1		1		1			53
Vítor Meira	Brazil	2006–07	1 (2)								0
Ananda Mikola	Indonesia	2005–06, 2006–07	20 (40)								17
Giorgio Mondini	Switzerland	2005–06	2 (4)								0
Franck Montagny	France	2007–08	2 (4)								10
Daniel Morad ( (Canada) )	Lebanon	2008–09	7 (14)								8
Christian Murchison	Singapore	2006–07	6 (12)								3
Alexandre Negrão	Brazil	2007–08	2 (4)								0
Hideki Noda	Japan	2005–06	1 (2)								3
Fabio Onidi	Italy	2008–09	1 (2)								2
Max Papis	Italy	2005–06	1 (2)								4
Álvaro Parente	Portugal	2005–06, 2006–07	13 (26)				1	2			76
Sergio Pérez	Mexico	2006–07	1 (2)								0
Clivio Piccione	Monaco	2008–09	7 (14)					1	1		35
Alessandro Pier Guidi	Italy	2006–07	2 (4)								5
Nelson Piquet, Jr.	Brazil	2005–06	7 (14)	2	1	1	1	2	2	3	63
Edoardo Piscopo	Italy	2007–08, 2008–09	11 (22)								16
Will Power	Australia	2005–06	1 (2)								7
Alexandre Prémat	France	2005–06	6 (12)	7	4	3	1		2	3	94
Nicolas Prost	France	2008–09	4 (8)								8
Graham Rahal ( (United States) )	Lebanon	2005–06	3 (6)								0
Jonny Reid	New Zealand	2005–06, 2006–07, 2007–08	19 (38)	7	4	3	5	3	4	6	219
Karl Reindler	Australia	2006–07	5 (10)					1			8
Buddy Rice	United States	2007–08	2 (4)								0
Tuka Rocha	Brazil	2005–06	4 (8)								0
Roman Rusinov	Russia	2005–06	1 (2)								0
Filip Salaquarda	Czech Republic	2006–07, 2007–08	4 (8)								1
Tomas Scheckter	South Africa	2005–06	2 (4)								1
Timo Scheider	Germany	2005–06	7 (14)				1				38
Basil Shaaban	Lebanon	2005–06, 2006–07	9 (18)								0
Hayanari Shimoda	Japan	2005–06	5 (10)								2
Stephen Simpson	South Africa	2005–06, 2006–07	10 (20)					1	0		19
Scott Speed	United States	2005–06	3 (6)								7
Moreno Soeprapto	Indonesia	2006–07	1 (2)								0
Sebastian Stahl	Germany	2005–06	1 (2)								0
Jonathan Summerton	United States	2006–07, 2007–08	12 (24)	1	1		2	1			74
Parthiva Sureshwaren	India	2006–07, 2007–08	2 (4)								0
Adrian Sutil	Germany	2005–06	3 (6)								0
Enrico Toccacelo	Italy; Pakistan (Note: At the 2005–06 South African race, Toccacelo drove the Pakistan car after Adam Khan was injured during practice sessions.)	2005–06, 2006–07, 2007–08	21 (42)	1		1	1	4			26
Ho-Pin Tung	China	2006–07, 2008–09	11 (20)					1			20
João Urbano	Portugal	2006–07, 2007–08	7 (14)								5
Chris van der Drift	New Zealand	2008–09	2 (4)								6
Alan van der Merwe	South Africa	2006–07, 2008–09	5 (10)								0
Renger van der Zande	Netherlands	2006–07	2 (3)								7
Aleksey Vasilyev	Russia	2005–06	1 (2)								0
Jean-Karl Vernay	France	2006–07	2 (4)								4
Jos Verstappen	Netherlands	2005–06	11 (22)	1		1	1				69
Christian Vietoris	Germany	2006–07, 2007–08	4 (8)	1		1	1			1	44
Danny Watts	(United Kingdom) Great Britain	2008–09	3 (6)					2	1		20
Robert Wickens	Canada	2007–08	7 (14)	1	1		2	2	2	1	75
Alex Yoong	Malaysia	2005–06, 2006–07, 2007–08	28 (54)	4	3	1	2		2	3	140
Nikos Zachos	Greece	2006–07	1 (1)								0
Adrian Zaugg	South Africa	2006–07, 2007–08, 2008–09	22 (24)	3	2	1	1	2	5	4	139
