= List of A1 Grand Prix records =

This article is a list of records in the A1 Grand Prix World Cup of Motorsport, since the inaugural 2005–06 A1 Grand Prix season, and is accurate up to and including the 2008–09 A1 Grand Prix season.

== A1 Grand Prix team records ==
=== Championships ===
	Team	Title	2nd	3rd
1	Switzerland	1	2	
2	France	1		
2	Germany	1		
2	(Republic of Ireland) Ireland	1		
5	New Zealand		2	
6	(United Kingdom) Great Britain			3
7	Portugal			1

=== Wins ===
	Team	Wins	Sprint	Feature	Winning drivers
1	France	15	8	7	Alexandre Prémat 7, Nicolas Lapierre 6, Loïc Duval 2
2	Germany	11	4	7	Nico Hülkenberg 9, Michael Ammermüller 1, Christian Vietoris 1
3	Switzerland	10	5	5	Neel Jani 10
4	New Zealand	7	4	3	Jonny Reid 7
5	(Republic of Ireland) Ireland	6	3	3	Adam Carroll 6
6	(United Kingdom) Great Britain	5	3	2	Robbie Kerr 3, Oliver Jarvis 2
6	Malaysia	5	4	1	Alex Yoong 4, Fairuz Fauzy 1
8	Netherlands	4	3	1	Jeroen Bleekemolen 2, Robert Doornbos 1, Jos Verstappen 1
9	South Africa	3	2	1	Adrian Zaugg 3
10	Brazil	2	1	1	Nelson Piquet Jr. 2
10	Canada	2	1	1	Sean McIntosh 1, Robert Wickens 1
10	India	2	0	2	Narain Karthikeyan 2
10	Mexico	2	1	1	Salvador Durán 2
14	Czech Republic	1	0	1	Tomáš Enge 1
14	Italy	1	0	1	Enrico Toccacelo 1
14	Portugal	1	0	1	Filipe Albuquerque 1
14	(United States) USA	1	0	1	Jonathan Summerton 1

- Most wins in a season : 13 (7 Sprints, 6 Mains) France in 2005–06.

=== Pole positions ===
	Team	Pole positions	Pole drivers
1	Switzerland	10	Neel Jani 10
2	France	6	Loïc Duval 2, Nicolas Lapierre 2, Alexandre Prémat 2
2	(Republic of Ireland) Ireland	6	Adam Carroll 6
4	(United Kingdom) Great Britain	5	Robbie Kerr 4, Danny Watts 1
4	Netherlands	5	Jeroen Bleekemolen 4, Robert Doornbos 1
4	South Africa	5	Adrian Zaugg 5
7	Germany	4	Nico Hülkenberg 3, Michael Ammermüller 1
7	New Zealand	4	Jonny Reid 4
9	Malaysia	3	Alex Yoong 2, Fairuz Fauzy 1
10	Brazil	2	Nelson Piquet Jr. 2
10	Canada	2	Robert Wickens 2
12	India	1	Narain Karthikeyan 1
12	Italy	1	Vitantonio Liuzzi 1
12	Mexico	1	Salvador Durán 1
12	Monaco	1	Clivio Piccione 1

- Most pole positions in a season : 6 Switzerland in 2007–08, and (Republic of Ireland) Ireland in 2008–09.

=== Fastest laps ===
	Team	Fastest laps	Fastest lap drivers
1	France	11	Alexandre Prémat 5, Nicolas Lapierre 4, Loïc Duval 2
2	(Republic of Ireland) Ireland	9	Adam Carroll 6, Ralph Firman 3
2	Switzerland	9	Neel Jani 8, Sébastien Buemi 1
4	Germany	6	Nico Hülkenberg 5, Christian Vietoris 1
4	New Zealand	6	Jonny Reid 6
6	Mexico	5	Salvador Durán 5
7	Brazil	4	Nelson Piquet Jr. 4
7	China	4	Cheng Congfu 4
7	(United Kingdom) Great Britain	4	Oliver Jarvis 2, Robbie Kerr 2
7	Malaysia	4	Alex Yoong 3, Fairuz Fauzy 1
7	South Africa	4	Adrian Zaugg 4
12	Netherlands	3	Jos Verstappen 2, Robert Doornbos 1
12	(United States) USA	3	Phil Giebler 1, Charlie Kimball 1, Jonathan Summerton 1
14	Canada	2	James Hinchcliffe 1, Robert Wickens 1
14	Portugal	2	Filipe Albuquerque 2
16	Australia	1	John Martin 1
16	Italy	1	Enrico Toccacelo 1

- Most fastest laps in a season : 9 France in 2005–06.

=== Points ===
	Team	Points
1	Switzerland	438
2	France	404
3	(United Kingdom) Great Britain	343
4	New Zealand	333
5	Netherlands	294
6	(Republic of Ireland) Ireland	282
7	Germany	251
8	Portugal	227
9	Malaysia	197
10	Canada	167

==== Teams yet to score points ====
- Both teams have yet to reappear since 2005–06.

	Team	Races	Starts
1	Russia	3	6
2	Greece	2	4

=== Other ===
==== Most drivers used during same weekend ====
- France used three different drivers at the same 2007–08 South Africa weekend: Loïc Duval as race driver; Jonathan Cochet as practice driver; and Nicolas Prost as rookie driver. ( Greece employed three different drivers at the Netherlands weekend in 2006–07, but only two took part).

==== Consecutive starts without points ====
- Lebanon participated in 65 races without winning points beginning with the inaugural 2005–06 Great Britain Sprint Race. The team finally scored its first-ever points finish in the feature race at Zandvoort, in its 33rd race weekend.

== Driver records ==
=== Caps ===
	Driver	Caps	First Cap
1	(Switzerland) Neel Jani	60	Sprint Race, 2005–06 (United Kingdom)
2	(Malaysia) Alex Yoong	54	Feature Race, 2005–06 (United Kingdom)
3	(Netherlands) Jeroen Bleekemolen	47	Sprint Race, 2006–07 (Netherlands)
4	(United Kingdom) Robbie Kerr	46	Sprint Race, 2005–06 (United Kingdom)
5	(Mexico) Salvador Durán	44	Sprint Race, 2005–06 (United Kingdom)
5	(South Africa) Adrian Zaugg	44	Sprint Race, 2006–07 (Netherlands)
7	(India) Narain Karthikeyan	40	Sprint Race, 2006–07 (New Zealand)
7	(Indonesia) Ananda Mikola	40	Sprint Race, 2005–06 (United Kingdom)
7	(Italy) Enrico Toccacelo	40	Sprint Race, 2005–06 (United Kingdom)
10	(Czech Republic) Tomáš Enge	38	Sprint Race, 2005–06 (Germany)
10	(New Zealand) Jonny Reid	38	Sprint Race, 2005–06 (Germany)

==== Youngest capped drivers ====
	Driver	Age	First race
1	(India) Armaan Ebrahim	16 years, 5 months and 6 days	Sprint Race, 2005–06 (Portugal)
2	(Lebanon) Graham Rahal	17 years, 1 month and 22 days	Sprint Race, 2005–06 (United States)
3	(Mexico) Sergio Pérez	17 years, 3 months and 20 days	Sprint Race, 2006–07 (China)
4	(Brazil) Felipe Guimarães	17 years, 6 months and 13 days	Sprint Race, 2008–09 (Netherlands)
5	(Czech Republic) Josef Král	17 years, 8 months and 9 days	Sprint Race, 2007–08 (South Africa)
6	(Switzerland) Sébastien Buemi	17 years and 11 months	Sprint Race, 2006–07 (Netherlands)
7	(Germany) Christian Vietoris	17 years, 11 months and 24 days	Sprint Race, 2006–07 (Mexico)
8	(Czech Republic) Jan Charouz	18 years, 2 months and 8 days	Sprint Race, 2005–06 (United Kingdom)
9	(New Zealand) Earl Bamber	18 years, 2 months and 26 days	Sprint Race, 2008–09 (Netherlands)
10	(Russia) Mikhail Aleshin	18 years, 5 months and 1 day	Sprint Race, 2005–06 (Portugal)

==== Oldest capped drivers ====
	Driver	Age	Last race
1	(Mexico) Jorge Goeters	37 years, 9 months and 18 days	Sprint Race, 2007–08 (China)
2	(Japan) Hideki Noda	36 years, 7 months and 2 days	Feature Race, 2005–06 (Germany)
3	(Italy) Massimiliano Papis	36 years, 5 months and 9 days	Feature Race, 2005–06 (United States)
4	(United States) Bryan Herta	35 years, 9 months and 17 days	Feature Race, 2005–06 (United States)
5	(Brazil) Christian Fittipaldi	35 years, 3 months and 15 days	Feature Race, 2005–06 (China)
6	(Canada) Patrick Carpentier	34 years, 7 months and 20 days	Feature Race, 2005–06 (China)
7	(Netherlands) Jos Verstappen	34 years and 29 days	Feature Race, 2005–06 (China)
8	(Russia) Alexey Vasilyev	33 years, 8 months and 12 days	Feature Race, 2005–06 (United Kingdom)
9	(Singapore) Denis Lian	33 years and 7 months	Feature Race, 2006–07 (Czech Republic)
10	(Pakistan) Nur Ali	32 years, 8 months and 17 days	Feature Race, 2006–07 (United Kingdom)

=== Wins ===
	Driver	Wins	Starts	Sprint	Feature
1	(Switzerland) Neel Jani	10	60	5	5
2	(Germany) Nico Hülkenberg	9	20	3	6
3	(France) Alexandre Prémat	7	10	4	3
3	(New Zealand) Jonny Reid	7	38	4	3
5	(Republic of Ireland) Adam Carroll	6	32	3	3
5	(France) Nicolas Lapierre	6	23	3	3
7	(Malaysia) Alex Yoong	4	54	3	1
8	(United Kingdom) Robbie Kerr	3	46	3	0
8	(South Africa) Adrian Zaugg	3	44	2	1
10	(Netherlands) Jeroen Bleekemolen	2	47	2	0
10	(Mexico) Salvador Durán	2	44	1	1
10	(France) Loïc Duval	2	26	1	1
10	(United Kingdom) Oliver Jarvis	2	14	0	2
10	(India) Narain Karthikeyan	2	40	0	2
10	(Brazil) Nelson Piquet Jr.	2	14	1	1

- Youngest : (Germany) Christian Vietoris, 18y 9m 19d, Feature Race, 2007–08 (New Zealand)

=== Pole positions ===
	Driver	Pole positions	Starts
1	(Switzerland) Neel Jani	10	60
2	(Republic of Ireland) Adam Carroll	6	32
3	(South Africa) Adrian Zaugg	5	44
4	(Netherlands) Jeroen Bleekemolen	4	47
4	(United Kingdom) Robbie Kerr	4	46
4	(New Zealand) Jonny Reid	4	38
7	(Germany) Nico Hülkenberg	3	20
8	(France) Loïc Duval	2	26
8	(France) Nicolas Lapierre	2	23
8	(Brazil) Nelson Piquet Jr.	2	14
8	(France) Alexandre Prémat	2	10
8	(Canada) Robert Wickens	2	14
8	(Malaysia) Alex Yoong	2	54

- Youngest : (Canada) Robert Wickens, 18y 11m 11d, Sprint Race, 2007–08 (South Africa) .

=== Fastest laps ===
	Driver	Fastest laps	Starts
1	(Switzerland) Neel Jani	8	60
2	(Republic of Ireland) Adam Carroll	6	32
2	(New Zealand) Jonny Reid	6	38
4	(Mexico) Salvador Durán	5	44
4	(Germany) Nico Hülkenberg	5	20
4	(France) Alexandre Prémat	5	10
7	(China) Cheng Congfu	4	36
7	(France) Nicolas Lapierre	4	23
7	(Brazil) Nelson Piquet Jr.	4	14
7	(South Africa) Adrian Zaugg	4	44

- Youngest : (Switzerland) Sébastien Buemi, 18y 5m 29d, Feature Race, 2006–07 (United Kingdom)

=== Other ===
==== Consecutive starts ====
(Malaysia) Alex Yoong ran consecutively 45 starts (24 races) from Feature Race, 2005–06 (Malaysia) to Feature Race, 2007–08 (New Zealand) .

==== Different teams ====
- Enrico Toccacelo ran for two different teams, A1 Team Italy and A1 Team Pakistan. He raced the Pakistani car after Adam Langley-Khan was injured during practice sessions of 2005–06, South Africa.
- Daniel Morad drove as Rookie driver for Canada in 2007–08 and as Main driver for Lebanon in 2008–09. His Canadian-Lebanese heritage allowed him to switch nationalities, as he had not yet made his race debut.

== Other ==
=== Events by Country ===
	Country	Events	Venues	Tracks
1	China	6	4	Beijing International Streetcircuit, Chengdu Goldenport Circuit, Shanghai International Circuit x3, Zhuhai International Circuit
2	(United Kingdom) Great Britain	4	1	Brands Hatch x4
2	Malaysia	4	1	Sepang International Circuit x4
2	South Africa	4	2	Durban street circuit x3, Kyalami
5	Australia	3	1	Eastern Creek Raceway x3
5	Mexico	3	2	Fundidora Park Raceway, Autódromo Hermanos Rodríguez x2
5	Netherlands	3	1	Circuit Park Zandvoort x3
5	New Zealand	3	1	Taupo Motorsport Park x3
9	Czech Republic	2	1	Auto Motodrom Brno x2
9	Indonesia	2	1	Sentul International Circuit x2
9	Portugal	2	2	Autódromo Internacional do Algarve, Autódromo do Estoril

=== Tracks with most race weekends ===
	Track	Events	Season
1	(United Kingdom) Brands Hatch	4	All seasons
1	(Malaysia) Sepang International Circuit	4	All seasons
3	(South Africa) Durban street circuit	3	2005–06 to 2007–08
3	(Australia) Eastern Creek Raceway	3	2005–06 to 2007–08
3	(China) Shanghai International Circuit	3	2005–06 to 2007–08
3	(New Zealand) Taupo Motorsport Park	3	2006–07 to 2008–09
3	(Netherlands) Zandvoort	3	2006–07 to 2008–09
8	(Czech Republic) Brno	2	2006–07 to 2007–08
8	Mexico City	2	2006–07 to 2007–08
8	(Indonesia) Sentul International Circuit	2	2005–06 to 2006–07

=== Fuel ===
A1 Grand Prix is the first racing series to use a 30% biofuel mix. An ethanol based product, Hiperflo E30, has been used since 2007–08, New Zealand.
