= List of A1 Grand Prix circuits =

This is a list of circuits which hosted an A1 Grand Prix race between 2005–06 and 2008–09. In total, 20 different circuits hosted A1 Grand Prix rounds. Both the first and final races of the series were held at Brands Hatch, in the United Kingdom.

Circuit	Type	Location	Country	Season(s)	Total	Map
Autódromo Hermanos Rodríguez	race circuit	Mexico City	Mexico	2006–07, 2007–08	2	Autódromo Hermanos Rodríguez
Autódromo Internacional do Algarve	race circuit	Portimão	Portugal	2008–09	1	
Automotodrom Brno	race circuit	Brno	Czech Republic	2006–07, 2007–08	2	Brno
Brands Hatch	race circuit	Kent	United Kingdom	2005–06, 2006–07, 2007–08, 2008–09	4	Brands Hatch
Chengdu Goldenport Circuit	race circuit	Chengdu	China	2008–09	1	
Circuit Park Zandvoort	race circuit	Zandvoort	Netherlands	2006–07, 2007–08, 2008–09	3	Zandvoort
Circuito do Estoril	race circuit	Estoril	Portugal	2005–06	1	Estoril
Dubai Autodrome	race circuit	Dubai	United Arab Emirates	2005–06	1	
Durban Street Circuit	street circuit	Durban	South Africa	2005–06, 2006–07, 2007–08	3	Durban street circuit
Eastern Creek Raceway	race circuit	Eastern Creek	Australia	2005–06, 2006–07, 2007–08	3	Eastern Creek Raceway
EuroSpeedway Lausitz	race circuit	Klettwitz	Germany	2005–06	1	Lausitz
Fundidora Park Raceway	race circuit	Monterrey	Mexico	2005–06	1	Fundidora Park
Jingkai Street Circuit	street circuit	Beijing	China	2006–07	1	Beijing International Streetcircuit
Kyalami	race circuit	Gauteng	South Africa	2008–09	1	Kyalami
Mazda Raceway Laguna Seca	race circuit	Monterey	United States	2005–06	1	Laguna Seca
Sepang International Circuit	race circuit	Kuala Lumpur	Malaysia	2005–06, 2006–07, 2007–08, 2008–09	4	Sepang
Sentul International Circuit	race circuit	Bogor	Indonesia	2005–06, 2006–07	2	
Shanghai International Circuit	race circuit	Shanghai	China	2005–06, 2006–07, 2007–08	3	Shanghai
Taupo Motorsport Park	race circuit	Taupō	New Zealand	2006–07, 2007–08, 2008–09	3	Taupō
Zhuhai International Circuit	race circuit	Zhuhai	China	2007–08	1	Zhuhai
