= A1 Team Austria =

Motor racing team, 2005–2006

- Austria
- Founded: 2005
- Seat holder(s): Lauda Motorsport Management
- Race driver(s): Mathias Lauda, Patrick Freisacher
- First race: 2005-06 Great Britain
- Rounds entered: 11
- Championships: 0
- Sprint race victories: 0
- Feature race victories: 0
- Pole positions: 0
- Fastest laps: 0
- Total points: 14

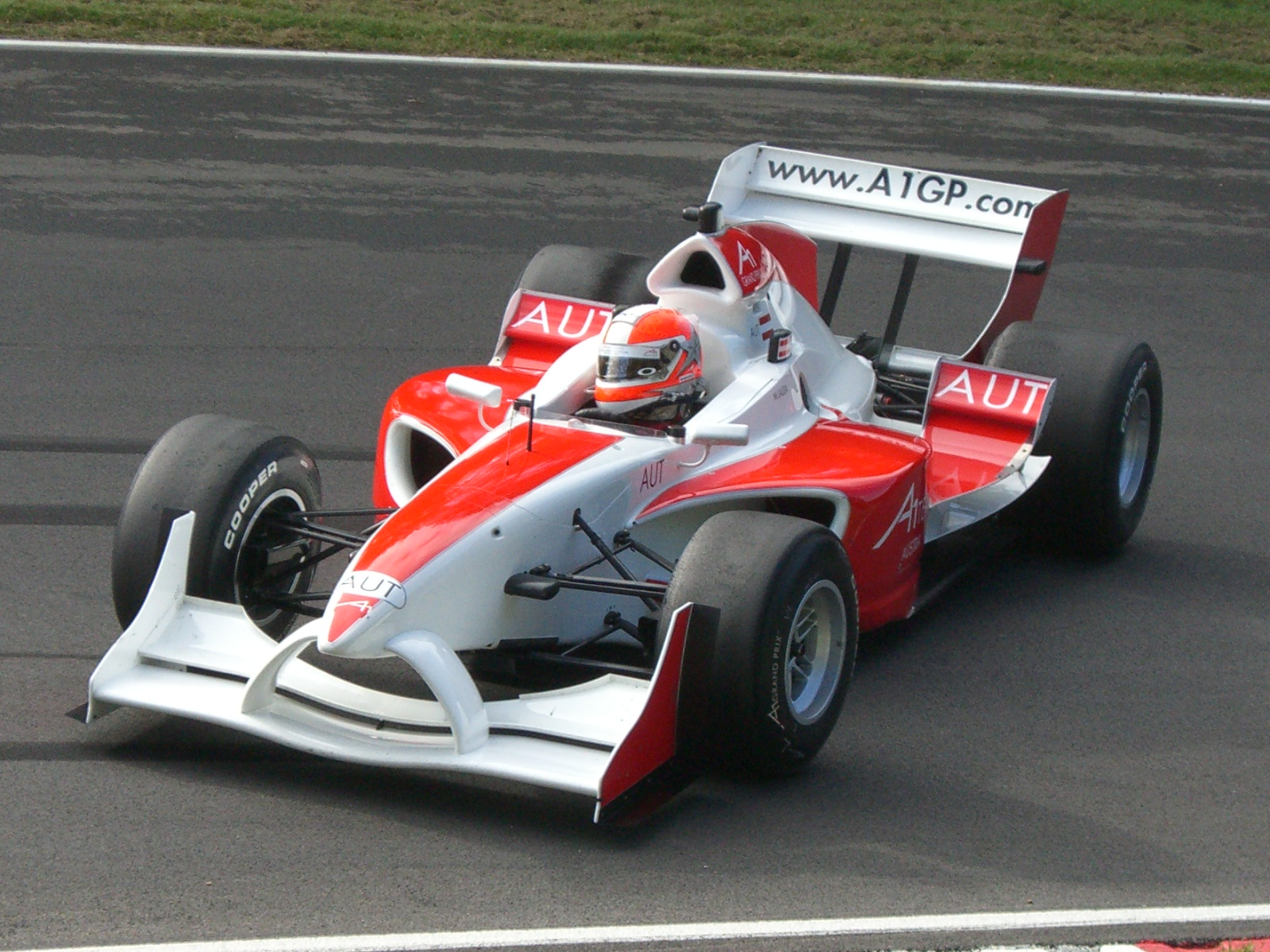
Mathias Lauda driving for A1 Team Austria at Brands Hatch during the 2005-06 A1 Grand Prix season

The A1 Team Austria was the Austrian representative team in A1 Grand Prix. The team competed only in the inaugural season of the championship.

== Ownership ==
A1 Team Austria was owned and operated by Lauda Motorsport Management. The management team included Niki Lauda and Keke Rosberg, both former Formula 1 World Champions. Whilst the team was racing for Austria, Team Rosberg, based in Germany operated the race team. Lauda's son, Lukas, officially ran Lauda Motorsport Management who worked with other teams such as Scuderia Coloni. Their entry to the championship was announced ahead of the first race, along with A1 Team Italy and A1 Team Japan.

Ahead of the 2006-07 season, A1 Team Austria withdrew from A1 Grand Prix along with Japan, Russia and Portugal.

== Drivers ==
During their one season in the championship, the A1 Team Austria employed Mathias Lauda and Patrick Friesacher as their drivers.

Name	Seasons	Races (starts)	A1GP Title	Wins	Sprint wins	Main wins	2nd	3rd	Poles	Fastest laps	Points
Patrick Friesacher	2005-06	1 (2)									3
Mathias Lauda	2005-06	10 (20)									11

== 2005-06 season ==
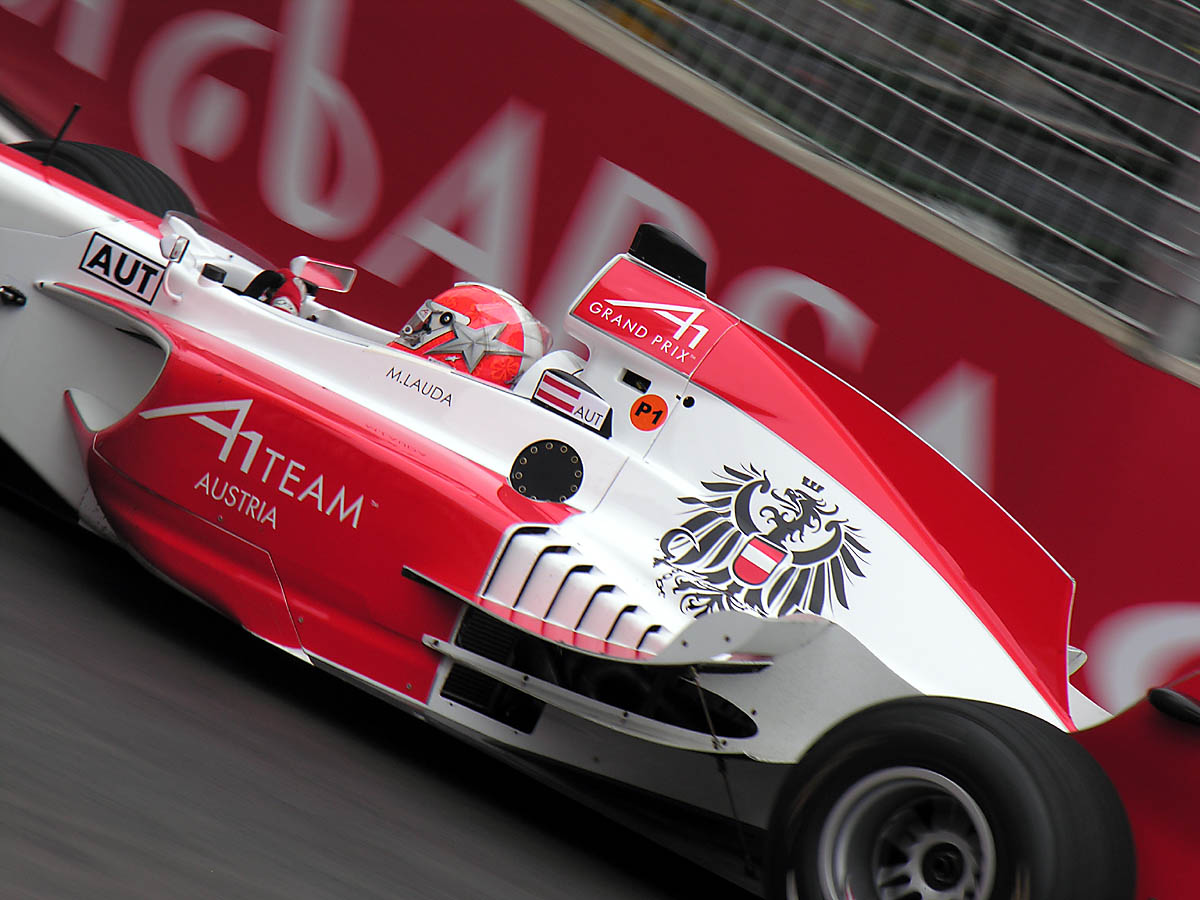
Lauda driving for A1 Team Austria at Durban, South Africa

The season began poorly for A1 Team Austria, with no points scored until the 3rd round in Portugal, where Lauda finished 10th in the feature race meaning a single point was gained. At the following two rounds, the car would suffer retirements in both sprint races. In Dubai, Lauda finished 7th in the feature race scoring 4 points for the team. He would score another 7th-place finish at the South African race, next time out.

Lauda would be replaced for the Mexican race by former Minardi F1 driver, Patrick Friesacher. Friesacher would finish 10th and 9th in the two races, A1 Team Austria's first double points scoring race weekend. Lauda would return for the final two rounds of the season in America and China, scoring points at Laguna Seca.

At the end of the season, A1 Team Austria scored 14 points and were classified 19th in the championship.

=== Complete A1 Grand Prix results ===
(key), "spr" indicate a Sprint Race, "fea" indicate a Main Race.

Year	Racing team	Chassis, engine, tyres	Drivers	1	2	3	4	5	6	7	8	9	10	11	12	13	14	15	16	17	18	19	20	21	22	Points	Rank
2005-06	Team Rosberg	Lola, Zytek, Cooper Avon		GBR spr	GBR fea	GER spr	GER fea	PRT spr	PRT fea	AUS spr	AUS fea	MYS spr	MYS fea	ARE spr	ARE fea	ZAF spr	ZAF fea	IDN spr	IDN fea	MEX spr	MEX fea	USA spr	USA fea	CHN spr	CHN fea	14	19th
2005-06	Team Rosberg	Lola, Zytek, Cooper Avon	Mathias Lauda	20	11	13	15	16	10	19	Ret	18	Ret	17	7	16	7	13	Ret			12	9	Ret	13	14	19th
2005-06	Team Rosberg	Lola, Zytek, Cooper Avon	Patrick Friesacher																	10	9					14	19th
