= 2006–07 A1 Grand Prix of Nations, Brazil =

Motor racing meeting

The 2006–07 A1 Grand Prix of Nations, Brazil was scheduled to be an A1 Grand Prix race, to be held on March 18, 2007, in Brazil. This was to be the ninth race in the 2006-07 A1 Grand Prix season and the first meeting held at the circuit.

On 17 January 2007 the A1GP administration announced that as a result of a delay in obtaining a local terrestrial television agreement that the event would be cancelled. The race was removed from the schedule in the same manner as the previous season.

== See also ==
- 2006-07 A1 Grand Prix season
