= 2005 Brands Hatch A1GP round =

2005–06 A1GP of Great Britain

Race Details
- Race 1 of 11 in the 2005–06 A1 Grand Prix season
- Date: 25 September 2005
- Location: Brands Hatch; Kent, England
- Weather: Fine

Qualifying
- Pole: Brazil (Nelson Piquet, Jr.)
- Time: 2:30.789 (1:15.824, 1:14.965)

Sprint Race
- 1st: Brazil (Nelson Piquet, Jr.)
- 2nd: France (Alexandre Prémat)
- 3rd: New Zealand (Matthew Halliday)

Main Race
- 1st: Brazil (Nelson Piquet, Jr.)
- 2nd: Australia (Will Power)
- 3rd: Mexico (Salvador Durán)

Fast Lap
- FL: Brazil (Nelson Piquet Jr.)
- Time: 1:16.547, (Lap 30 of Main Race)

Official Classifications

Layout of the Brands Hatch circuit.

The 2005–06 A1 Grand Prix of Nations, Great Britain was an event for the A1 Grand Prix motor racing championship, held over 23–25 September 2005 at the Brands Hatch circuit in Kent, England. This was the first of eleven rounds in the 2005–06 A1 Grand Prix season, and the first A1 Grand Prix event outright.

== Report ==
=== Practice ===
There were eight red flags in practice due to incidents. In the first session, A1 Team India's Karun Chandhok crashed into Jos Verstappen at a hairpin, sending him airborne and damaging his car to such an extent that he was unable to set a time in the second session. Rain affected the second session, causing slower speeds and spins. Free Practice 3, held on Saturday, saw A1 Team France top the timesheets with a 1:15.421 courtesy of Alexandre Prémat. Matthew Halliday set the second quickest time for A1 Team New Zealand, which was good enough to see him nominated for qualifying.

=== Qualifying ===
Nelson Piquet, Jr. took A1GP's first ever pole position for A1 Team Brazil. Piquet set the fastest time over the entire session, with a 1:14.965 on his third run. Combined with the best first-lap time, he produced an aggregate time of 2:30.769, leading the results by over three tenths of a second ahead of Halliday. Brazil did not attempt a time in the final run, which was topped by Prémat, placing them third on the grid for the sprint race. Fourth position went to Will Power of A1 Team Australia, followed by the home team A1 Team Great Britain. The A1 Grand Prix rules allowed teams to use one driver for qualifying and another for the race, provided the race driver's best practice time is within 102% of the team's best qualifying lap – resulting in Lebanon's Basil Shaaban and China's Qinghua Ma replaced with Khalil Beschir and Tengyi Jiang respectively.

=== Sprint race ===
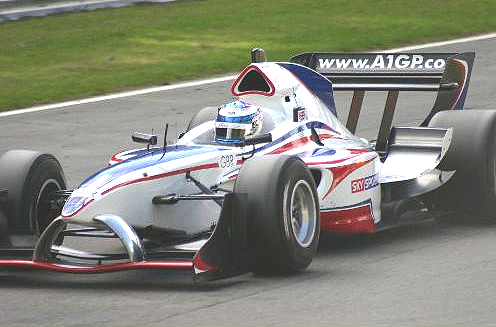
A1 Team Great Britain's Robbie Kerr finished 5th in the Sprint race.

Scheduled for 18 laps or 30 minutes (whichever came first), the first ever A1GP sprint race began with a rolling start. Prémat got the best start of the front-runners, slipping inside Halliday to move into second place. Power retained his fourth position, slightly ahead of Robbie Kerr for A1 Team Great Britain. Piquet made it through the first turn with no trouble, and quickly began building a sizeable lead. Jos Verstappen in the Dutch car suffered damage to his car after a collision with Stephen Simpson of South Africa, forcing him to limp back to the pits and retire from the race. Simpson was also required to pit at the end of the first lap to repair damage from the collision. The field remained in almost the same order for the remainder of the race, as Piquet, Prémat and Halliday produced a gap back to Power, who pulled away from Kerr to secure fourth place. A1 Team USA's Scott Speed moved from 17th to 11th on the opening lap and held that position until the end of the race. A1 Team Mexico remained 6th, ahead of the Pakistani car in 7th – which spent most of the race holding up Portugal – Switzerland and Ireland behind him.

=== Main race ===
Piquet took the first position on the grid for the feature race, thanks to his comprehensive victory in the sprint race. Prémat suffered a battery problem between the two races which required some frantic work by the pit crew, resulting in Premat leaving the pit lane with 45 seconds to spare. This time the race started with a standing start, however Halliday stalled from third spot and had to start from the pits. Prémat stalled on the race start proper, putting him out of the race immediately. Piquet led from Power on the opening lap. Further back in the field, Michael Devaney of Ireland collided with Neel Jani of Switzerland, putting both cars out of the race. Beschir spun off the track, hitting a wall on the outside and then coming back across the track narrowly in front of four cars. The Lebanese driver was able to continue the race, which was not the case for A1 Team India's Karun Chandhok and A1 Team Indonesia's Ananda Mikola who both did not complete lap 1. Portugal soon joined the ever-growing list of retirees when Álvaro Parente retired with a battery problem on lap two. Having started in 16th, Enrico Toccacelo of Italy climbed to a surprising 5th after taking an early compulsory pitstop.

Piquet continued to lead and open and impressive gap back to Power, who was being hounded by Kerr for second. Several battles were emerging throughout the field, involving Pakistan and Italy for 4th place, Germany and Malaysia for 6th, as well as Canada and South Africa for 9th. Speed rejoined the race after having to pit for a new nose cone earlier in the race, now lying several laps behind the leaders. With Germany taking its compulsory pitstop, Verstappen moved into 7th having started last. Malaysia lost time in the pit cycle as the mechanics struggled to fit a wheel, a common occurrence in early A1GP races. Pakistan, who had been held up by A1 Team Austria while trying to lap them, also lost out to the Netherlands when both teams pitted.

On lap 13, Toccacelo and Beschir collided at Paddock Hill Bend, resulting in the Lebanese car barrel-rolling through the gravel. The top three pitted as the Safety Car came out for the first time, but Brazil also had problems changing tyres Great Britain and Australia past. The British car then suffered another battery failure under the safety car, forcing Kerr to retire and promoting Power to the lead. Power led Piquet and Salvador Durán of Mexico on the restart. Only a few laps later, A1 Team Russia driver Aleksey Vasilyev spun off the track and forced the safety car to come out again. On the second restart, Piquet passed Power and drove away to win by 11 seconds over Australia, followed by Mexico, New Zealand, Malaysia, South Africa, the Netherlands, Japan, Canada and Germany. Piquet's win finished a clean-sweep for Brazil, claiming pole position, both race wins and the bonus point for the fastest race lap of the weekend to give the team the maximum 21 points.

== Results ==
=== Qualification ===
Qualification took place on Saturday, 24 September 2005. Lap times in blue (the two fastest times from a country) counted towards a countries' aggregate.

Pos.	Team	Driver	Sessions				Agg.	Gap
Pos.	Team	Driver	Q1	Q2	Q3	Q4	Agg.	Gap
1	Brazil	Nelson Piquet, Jr.	1:15.824	1:16.070	1:14.965	No time	2:30.789	
2	New Zealand	Matthew Halliday	1:16.359	1:16.032	1:15.389	1:15.728	2:31.117	+0.328
3	France	Alexandre Prémat	1:17.278	1:16.185	1:16.043	1:15.163	2:31.206	+0.417
4	Australia	Will Power	1:16.056	1:16.360	1:15.774	1:15.614	2:31.388	+0.599
5	(United Kingdom) Great Britain	Robbie Kerr	1:16.612	1:15.878	1:16.097	1:15.836	2:31.714	+0.925
6	Switzerland	Neel Jani	1:17.907	1:16.435	1:16.142	1:15.587	2:31.729	+0.940
7	Mexico	Salvador Durán	1:17.639	1:16.283	1:16.251	1:16.056	2:32.307	+1.518
8	Pakistan	Adam Khan	1:17.020	1:16.457	1:16.481	1:16.139	2:32.596	+1.807
9	Malaysia	Alex Yoong	1:18.507	1:16.362	1:16.448	1:16.270	2:32.632	+1.843
10	Japan	Ryō Fukuda	1:17.017	1:16.544	1:16.694	1:16.145	2:32.689	+1.900
11	Portugal	Álvaro Parente	1:17.199	1:16.528	No time	1:16.177	2:32.705	+1.916
12	(Republic of Ireland) Ireland	Michael Devaney	1:16.803	1:16.576	1:16.863	1:16.235	2:32.811	+2.022
13	Germany	Timo Scheider	1:16.965	1:16.624	1:16.639	1:16.357	2:32.981	+2.192
14	Netherlands	Jos Verstappen	1:16.882	1:17.510	1:16.472	1:16.603	2:33.075	+2.286
15	South Africa	Stephen Simpson	1:17.432	1:16.612	1:16.647	1:16.474	2:33.086	+2.297
16	Italy	Enrico Toccacelo	1:16.888	1:16.402	1:16.832	1:17.616	2:33.234	+2.445
17	United States	Scott Speed	1:17.625	1:17.638	1:16.950	1:16.367	2:33.317	+2.528
18	Indonesia	Ananda Mikola	1:20.253	1:17.267	1:16.864	1:16.560	2:33.424	+2.635
19	India	Karun Chandhok	1:18.272	1:18.286	1:17.341	1:16.785	2:34.126	+3.337
20	Czech Republic	Jan Charouz	1:18.318	1:17.813	1:18.743	1:16.973	2:34.786	+3.997
21	Canada	Sean McIntosh	1:19.902	1:18.485	1:18.189	1:18.467	2:36.656	+5.867
22	Austria	Mathias Lauda	1:18.977	1:19.148	1:18.186	1:18.692	2:36.878	+6.089
23	Lebanon	Basil Shaaban	1:18.671	1:18.433	No time	1:19.282	2:37.104	+6.315
24	China	Qinghua Ma	1:20.465	1:19.071	1:19.820	1:19.679	2:38.750	+7.961
25	Russia	Aleksey Vasilyev	1:21.615	1:21.298	1:20.597	1:20.706	2:41.303	+10.514

=== Sprint Race results ===
The Sprint Race took place on Sunday, 25 September 2005

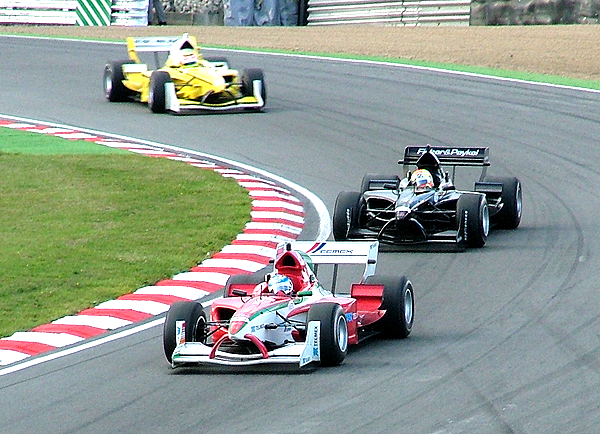
Mexico leads New Zealand

Pos.	Team	Driver	Laps	Time/Retired	Grid	Pts.
1	Brazil	Nelson Piquet, Jr.	18	23:15.682	1	10
2	France	Alexandre Prémat	18	+2.440	3	9
3	New Zealand	Matthew Halliday	18	+2.899	2	8
4	Australia	Will Power	18	+11.457	4	7
5	(United Kingdom) Great Britain	Robbie Kerr	18	+12.797	5	6
6	Mexico	Salvador Durán	18	+17.273	7	5
7	Pakistan	Adam Khan	18	+18.032	8	4
8	Portugal	Álvaro Parente	18	+18.189	11	3
9	Switzerland	Neel Jani	18	+20.851	6	2
10	(Republic of Ireland) Ireland	Michael Devaney	18	+21.056	12	1
11	United States	Scott Speed	18	+23.866	17	
12	Japan	Ryō Fukuda	18	+25.192	10	
13	Malaysia	Fairuz Fauzy	18	+25.351	9	
14	Germany	Timo Scheider	18	+25.905	13	
15	India	Karun Chandhok	18	+27.793	19	
16	Italy	Enrico Toccacelo	18	+35.521	16	
17	Indonesia	Ananda Mikola	18	+40.333	18	
18	Czech Republic	Jan Charouz	18	+40.346	20	
19	Canada	Sean McIntosh	18	+42.621	21	
20	Austria	Mathias Lauda	18	+55.293	22	
21	China	Tengyi Jiang	18	+58.194	24	
22	Lebanon	Khalil Beschir	18	+59.092	23	
23	Russia	Aleksey Vasilyev	17	+1 Lap	25	
24	South Africa	Stephen Simpson	17	+1 Lap	15	
DNF	Netherlands	Jos Verstappen	0	Crash damage	14	

=== Main Race results ===
The Main Race also took place on Sunday, 25 September 2005.

Pos.	Team	Driver	Laps	Time/Retired	Grid	Pts.
1	Brazil	Nelson Piquet, Jr.	38	55:01.910	1	10
2	Australia	Will Power	38	+11.330	4	9
3	Mexico	Salvador Durán	38	+23.125	6	8
4	New Zealand	Matthew Halliday	38	+23.705	3	7
5	Malaysia	Alex Yoong	38	+24.352	13	6
6	South Africa	Stephen Simpson	38	+24.852	24	5
7	Netherlands	Jos Verstappen	38	+25.630	25	4
8	Japan	Ryō Fukuda	38	+26.219	12	3
9	Canada	Sean McIntosh	38	+27.179	19	2
10	Germany	Timo Scheider	37	+1 Lap	14	1
11	Austria	Mathias Lauda	37	+1 Lap	20	
12	China	Tengyi Jiang	37	+1 Lap	21	
13	Pakistan	Adam Khan	35	+3 Laps	7	
DNF	Czech Republic	Jan Charouz	24	+14 Laps	18	
DNF	Russia	Aleksey Vasilyev	18	Spun out	23	
DNF	(United Kingdom) Great Britain	Robbie Kerr	17	Engine	5	
DNF	United States	Scott Speed	14	Withdrew	11	
DNF	Lebanon	Khalil Beschir	13	Crash	22	
DNF	Italy	Enrico Toccacelo	13	Crash	16	
DNF	Portugal	Álvaro Parente	1	Battery	8	
DNF	Switzerland	Neel Jani	1	Crash	9	
DNF	(Republic of Ireland) Ireland	Michael Devaney	0	Crash	10	
DNF	Indonesia	Ananda Mikola	0	+38 Laps	17	
DNS	France	Alexandre Prémat		Stalled		
DNS	India	Karun Chandhok				

=== Points ===
Event and Championship standings

Pos.	Team	SR	MR	Total
1	Brazil	1	1^{1}	21
2	Australia	4	2	16
3	New Zealand	3	4	15
4	Mexico	6	3	13
5	France	2	DNS	9
6	Malaysia	13	5	6
7	(United Kingdom) Great Britain	5	DNF	6
8	South Africa	24	6	5
9	Pakistan	7	13	4
10	Netherlands	DNF	7	4
11	Japan	12	8	3
12	Portugal	8	DNF	3
13	Canada	19	9	2
14	Switzerland	9	DNF	2
15	Germany	14	10	1
16	(Republic of Ireland) Ireland	10	DNF	1
17	Austria	20	11	0
18	United States	11	DNF	0
19	China	21	12	0
20	India	15	DNS	0
21	Italy	16	DNF	0
22	Indonesia	17	DNF	0
23	Czech Republic	18	DNF	0
24	Lebanon	22	DNF	0
25	Russia	23	DNF	0

- ^1 – A1 Team Brazil received a bonus point for setting the fastest race lap of the weekend.
