= 2006–07 A1 Grand Prix season =

A1 Grand Prix season

2006–07 A1 Grand Prix of Nations

Champions
- Champions: Germany

Seasons
- ← 2005–06 2007–08 →

The 2006–07 A1 Grand Prix season was the second season for the A1 Grand Prix series. It began on 1 October 2006, at Circuit Park Zandvoort, and the season ended at Brands Hatch on 29 April 2007. A1 Team Germany won it with 128 points, 35 points lead ahead Team New Zealand.

== Calendar ==
The second A1 Grand Prix season consisted of 11 races held in 10 different countries. Each race is to be run over a three-day weekend, including a practice session on each of Friday and Saturday before a qualifying session on Saturday, and then two races on Sunday. Changes in the weekend program for second season included changing the time certain limits of the Sprint race to 20 minutes and Feature race to 70 minutes, and reducing the pointscore in the Sprint race to only the top six positions.

Round	Event	Circuit	Dates
1	A1 Grand Prix of Nations, Netherlands	Circuit Park Zandvoort	29 September – 1 October 2006
2	A1 Grand Prix of Nations, Czech Republic	Automotodrom Brno	6–8 October 2006
3	A1 Grand Prix of Nations, China (Beijing)	Jingkai Street Circuit	10–12 November 2006
4	A1 Grand Prix of Nations, Malaysia	Sepang International Circuit	24–26 November 2006
5	A1 Grand Prix of Nations, Indonesia	Sentul International Circuit	8–10 December 2006
6	A1 Grand Prix of Nations, New Zealand	Taupo Motorsport Park	19–21 January 2007
7	A1 Grand Prix of Nations, Australia	Eastern Creek Raceway	2–4 February 2007
8	A1 Grand Prix of Nations, South Africa	Durban Street Circuit	23–25 February 2007
9	A1 Grand Prix of Nations, Mexico	Autódromo Hermanos Rodríguez	23–25 March 2007
10	A1 Grand Prix of Nations, China (Shanghai)	Shanghai International Circuit	13–15 April 2007
11	(United Kingdom) A1 Grand Prix of Nations, Great Britain	Brands Hatch	27–29 April 2007
Map
2006–07 A1 Grand Prix season is located in Earth

=== Calendar changes ===
- A 12th race had been scheduled to have been held in Brazil; however, on 17 January 2007 the A1GP organisation announced that as a result of a delay in obtaining a local terrestrial television agreement then the event would be cancelled.
- After the finish to the Australian Feature race resulted in time certainty confusion, the time certain limits were reduced by a minute with an additional lap added after the time expired.

== Entry list ==
24 teams, each representing a different country, signed up for the second A1 Grand Prix season. All teams and drivers competed in Zytek-powered, Cooper Avon-shod and Lola A1GP chassis. Teams representing Greece and Singapore made their debuts, whilst the representatives of Austria, Japan and Russia did not return from the previous season.

Entrant (Team)	Driver	Events
(Australia) A1 Team Australia; Alan Docking Racing	Ryan Briscoe	1, 4–5
(Australia) A1 Team Australia; Alan Docking Racing	Karl Reindler	2–3, 6–8
(Australia) A1 Team Australia; Alan Docking Racing	Ian Dyk	9–11
(Brazil) A1 Team Brazil; Charouz Racing System	Tuka Rocha	1–2, 5, 7
(Brazil) A1 Team Brazil; Charouz Racing System	Raphael Matos	3–4, 6
(Brazil) A1 Team Brazil; Charouz Racing System	Bruno Junqueira	8–9, 11
(Brazil) A1 Team Brazil; Charouz Racing System	Vítor Meira	10
(Canada) A1 Team Canada; John Village Automotive	James Hinchcliffe	1–3, 6–9
(Canada) A1 Team Canada; John Village Automotive	Sean McIntosh	4–5, 10–11
(China) A1 Team China; Team Astromega	Congfu Cheng	1–4, 10–11
(China) A1 Team China; Team Astromega	Ho-Pin Tung	5–9
(Czech Republic) A1 Team Czech Republic; Charouz Racing System	Tomáš Kostka	1
(Czech Republic) A1 Team Czech Republic; Charouz Racing System	Tomáš Enge	2–4, 6–8
(Czech Republic) A1 Team Czech Republic; Charouz Racing System	Jaroslav Janiš	5, 9
(Czech Republic) A1 Team Czech Republic; Charouz Racing System	Filip Salaquarda	10
(Czech Republic) A1 Team Czech Republic; Charouz Racing System	Jan Charouz	11
(France) A1 Team France; DAMS	Nicolas Lapierre	1–5
(France) A1 Team France; DAMS	Loïc Duval	6–8, 11
(France) A1 Team France; DAMS	Jean-Karl Vernay	9–10
(Germany) A1 Team Germany; Super Nova Racing	Nico Hülkenberg	1–8, 10–11
(Germany) A1 Team Germany; Super Nova Racing	Christian Vietoris	9
(United Kingdom) A1 Team Great Britain	Darren Manning	1
(United Kingdom) A1 Team Great Britain	Robbie Kerr	2, 4–8, 10–11
(United Kingdom) A1 Team Great Britain	Oliver Jarvis	3, 9
(Greece) A1 Team Greece; Arena Motorsport	Takis Kaitatzis	1–2
(Greece) A1 Team Greece; Arena Motorsport	Nikos Zachos	2
(India) A1 Team India; Arena Motorsport	Armaan Ebrahim	1–5
(India) A1 Team India; Arena Motorsport	Narain Karthikeyan	6, 8–11
(India) A1 Team India; Arena Motorsport	Parthiva Sureshwaren	7
A1 Team Indonesia	Ananda Mikola	1–10
A1 Team Indonesia	Moreno Soeprapto	11
(Republic of Ireland) A1 Team Ireland; Status Grand Prix	Michael Devaney	1–4
(Republic of Ireland) A1 Team Ireland; Status Grand Prix	Richard Lyons	5–11
(Italy) A1 Team Italy; Team Ghinzani	Alessandro Pier Guidi	1–2
(Italy) A1 Team Italy; Team Ghinzani	Enrico Toccacelo	3–11
(Lebanon) A1 Team Lebanon; Carlin Motorsport	Basil Shaaban	1, 3, 5
(Lebanon) A1 Team Lebanon; Carlin Motorsport	(United States) Graham Rahal	2
(Lebanon) A1 Team Lebanon; Carlin Motorsport	Khalil Beschir	4
(Lebanon) A1 Team Lebanon; Carlin Motorsport	(United Kingdom) Alexander Khateeb	6–7
(Lebanon) A1 Team Lebanon; Carlin Motorsport	(Brazil) Allam Khodair	8–11
A1 Team Malaysia	Alex Yoong	All
A1 Team Mexico	Salvador Durán	1–9
A1 Team Mexico	Sergio Pérez	10
A1 Team Mexico	Juan Pablo García	11
(Netherlands) A1 Team Netherlands; Racing for Holland	Jeroen Bleekemolen	1–9, 11
(Netherlands) A1 Team Netherlands; Racing for Holland	Renger van der Zande	9–10
(New Zealand) A1 Team New Zealand; Super Nova Racing	Matthew Halliday	1, 3, 8, 11
(New Zealand) A1 Team New Zealand; Super Nova Racing	Jonny Reid	2, 4–7, 9–10
(Pakistan) A1 Team Pakistan; Performance Racing	Nur Ali	All
(Portugal) A1 Team Portugal; Team Astromega	Álvaro Parente	8–9, 11
(Portugal) A1 Team Portugal; Team Astromega	João Urbano	10
(Singapore) A1 Team Singapore; West Surrey Racing	Christian Murchison	1, 3–4, 6–8
(Singapore) A1 Team Singapore; West Surrey Racing	Denis Lian	2
(South Africa) A1 Team South Africa; DAMS	Adrian Zaugg	1, 3–4, 8–9, 11
(South Africa) A1 Team South Africa; DAMS	Stephen Simpson	2
(South Africa) A1 Team South Africa; DAMS	Alan van der Merwe	5–7, 10
(Switzerland) A1 Team Switzerland; Max Motorsport	Sébastien Buemi	1–2, 6–7, 10–11
(Switzerland) A1 Team Switzerland; Max Motorsport	Neel Jani	3–5, 8
(Switzerland) A1 Team Switzerland; Max Motorsport	Marcel Fässler	9
(United States) A1 Team USA; West Surrey Racing	Philip Giebler	1–5, 7
(United States) A1 Team USA; West Surrey Racing	Ryan Hunter-Reay	6
(United States) A1 Team USA; West Surrey Racing	Jonathan Summerton	8–11

=== Mid-season changes ===
- A1 Team Greece only participated in the opening two rounds.
- A1 Team Singapore missed the last three races allegedly due to an injury suffered by their driver Christian Murchison in South Africa.
- A1 Team Portugal started their season in South Africa.

== Results and standings ==
=== Results summary ===
Round		Event	Pole position	Fastest lap	Winner	Report
1	S	Netherlands	(South Africa) Adrian Zaugg	(South Africa) Adrian Zaugg	(South Africa) Adrian Zaugg	Report
1	F	Netherlands		(Malaysia) Alex Yoong	(Germany) Nico Hülkenberg	Report
2	S	Czech Republic	(New Zealand) Jonny Reid	(Malaysia) Alex Yoong	(Malaysia) Alex Yoong	Report
2	F	Czech Republic		(United States) Philip Giebler	(Malaysia) Alex Yoong	Report
3	S	China (Beijing)	(Netherlands) Jeroen Bleekemolen	(Mexico) Salvador Durán	(Netherlands) Jeroen Bleekemolen	Report
3	F	China (Beijing)		(Canada) James Hinchcliffe	(Italy) Enrico Toccacelo	Report
4	S	Malaysia	(Switzerland) Neel Jani	(New Zealand) Jonny Reid	(Switzerland) Neel Jani	Report
4	F	Malaysia		(Italy) Enrico Toccacelo	(Germany) Nico Hülkenberg	Report
5	S	Indonesia	(New Zealand) Jonny Reid	(United Kingdom) Robbie Kerr	(New Zealand) Jonny Reid	Report
5	F	Indonesia		(New Zealand) Jonny Reid	(New Zealand) Jonny Reid	Report
6	S	New Zealand	(Germany) Nico Hülkenberg	(Germany) Nico Hülkenberg	(Germany) Nico Hülkenberg	Report
6	F	New Zealand		(Germany) Nico Hülkenberg	(Germany) Nico Hülkenberg	Report
7	S	Australia	(Germany) Nico Hülkenberg	(Germany) Nico Hülkenberg	(Germany) Nico Hülkenberg	Report
7	F	Australia		(Germany) Nico Hülkenberg	(Germany) Nico Hülkenberg	Report
8	S	South Africa	(Germany) Nico Hülkenberg	(Germany) Nico Hülkenberg	(Germany) Nico Hülkenberg	Report
8	F	South Africa		(South Africa) Adrian Zaugg	(Germany) Nico Hülkenberg	Report
9	S	Mexico	(Malaysia) Alex Yoong	(Mexico) Salvador Durán	(Malaysia) Alex Yoong	Report
9	F	Mexico		(United States) Jonathan Summerton	(United Kingdom) Oliver Jarvis	Report
10	S	China (Shanghai)	(United Kingdom) Robbie Kerr	(New Zealand) Jonny Reid	(United Kingdom) Robbie Kerr	Report
10	F	China (Shanghai)		(New Zealand) Jonny Reid	(New Zealand) Jonny Reid	Report
11	S	United Kingdom	(United Kingdom) Robbie Kerr	(United Kingdom) Robbie Kerr	(United Kingdom) Robbie Kerr	Report
11	F	United Kingdom		(Switzerland) Sébastien Buemi	(Germany) Nico Hülkenberg	Report

=== Championship standings ===
Pos	Team	Drivers	(Netherlands) NED		(Czech Republic) CZE		(China) BEI		(Malaysia) MLY		(Indonesia) INA		(New Zealand) NZL		(Australia) AUS		(South Africa) RSA		(Mexico) MEX		(China) SHA		(United Kingdom) GBR		Pts
Pos	Team	Drivers	S	F	S	F	S	F	S	F	S	F	S	F	S	F	S	F	S	F	S	F	S	F	Pts
1	Germany	Nico Hülkenberg	4	1	Ret	4	5	Ret	2	1	5	2	**1**	1	**1**	1	**1**	1			3	3	2	1	128
1	Germany	Christian Vietoris																	Ret	9					128
2	New Zealand	Matthew Halliday	6	11			10	9									3	3					16	8	93
2	New Zealand	Jonny Reid			**Ret**	7			3	8	**1**	1	3	3	2	2			16	6	2	1			93
3	(United Kingdom) Great Britain	Darren Manning	5	7																					92
3	(United Kingdom) Great Britain	Robbie Kerr			9	6			5	2	3	Ret	8	Ret	19	10	9	2			**1**	2	**1**	2	92
3	(United Kingdom) Great Britain	Oliver Jarvis					7	2											2	1					92
4	France	Nicolas Lapierre	3	Ret	3	Ret	17	4	6	3	7	3													67
4	France	Loïc Duval											2	2	3	9	2	Ret					4	7	67
4	France	Jean-Karl Vernay																	Ret	20	Ret	8			67
5	Netherlands	Jeroen Bleekemolen	9	4	11	9	**1**	Ret	7	9	13	DSQ	4	5	5	4	4	6		17			6	5	57
5	Netherlands	Renger van der Zande																	9		9	4			57
6	Malaysia	Alex Yoong	12	17	1	1	14	12	4	7	12	5	19	11	7	6	Ret	8	**1**	5	6	11	5	9	55
7	Italy	Alessandro Pier Guidi	Ret	6	14	20																			52
7	Italy	Enrico Toccacelo					3	1	Ret	13	11	4	9	8	15	12	12	Ret	7	4	10	7	3	3	52
8	Switzerland	Sébastien Buemi	10	8	8	10							5	4	4	7					4	9	Ret	DSQ	50
8	Switzerland	Neel Jani					9	Ret	**1**	4	10	8					5	4							50
8	Switzerland	Marcel Fässler																	10	14					50
9	United States	Philip Giebler	7	2	6	17	11	Ret	9	6	4	9			8	8									42
9	United States	Ryan Hunter-Reay											11	10											42
9	United States	Jonathan Summerton															Ret	Ret	5	2	5	Ret	9	6	42
10	Mexico	Salvador Durán	2	5	7	3	2	Ret	11	Ret	2	6	12	Ret	11	15	Ret	Ret	17	Ret					35
10	Mexico	Sergio Pérez																			15	Ret			35
10	Mexico	Juan Pablo García																					18	14	35
11	Canada	James Hinchcliffe	8	13	2	5	4	10					6	6	13	Ret	13	Ret	13	15					33
11	Canada	Sean McIntosh							8	5	8	Ret									Ret	6	10	12	33
12	Czech Republic	Tomáš Kostka	17	Ret																					27
12	Czech Republic	Tomáš Enge			5	2	8	6	Ret	14			17	12	9	5	11	Ret							27
12	Czech Republic	Jaroslav Janiš									16	7							12	12					27
12	Czech Republic	Filip Salaquarda																			17	10			27
12	Czech Republic	Jan Charouz																					13	15	27
13	Australia	Ryan Briscoe	13	3					12	17	6	10													25
13	Australia	Karl Reindler			15	16	12	3					14	13	14	14	16	Ret							25
13	Australia	Ian Dyk																	3	8	16	Ret	14	Ret	25
14	South Africa	Adrian Zaugg	**1**	Ret			Ret	5	13	12							7	Ret	4	3			15	Ret	24
14	South Africa	Stephen Simpson			Ret	11																			24
14	South Africa	Alan van der Merwe									9	Ret	7	16	16	Ret					8	12			24
15	China	Congfu Cheng	11	9	4	8	13	Ret	10	16											11	15	Ret	10	22
15	China	Ho-Pin Tung									Ret	13	13	9	6	3	14	Ret	6	10					22
16	India	Armaan Ebrahim	Ret	Ret	17	18	18	11	16	19	18	Ret													13
16	India	Narain Karthikeyan											10	7			15	9	11	18	7	17	7	4	13
16	India	Parthiva Sureshwaren													18	16									13
17	Portugal	Álvaro Parente															8	5	14	7			11	11	10
17	Portugal	João Urbano																			19	13			10
18	Brazil	Tuka Rocha	14	12	10	14					15	14			Ret	11									9
18	Brazil	Raphael Matos					6	7	19	18			16	14											9
18	Brazil	Bruno Junqueira															17	7	Ret	13			12	Ret	9
18	Brazil	Vítor Meira																			14	19			9
19	(Republic of Ireland) Ireland	Michael Devaney	15	14	13	13	20	Ret	14	10															8
19	(Republic of Ireland) Ireland	Richard Lyons									17	12	Ret	19	10	Ret	6	Ret	Ret	16	12	5	8	DSQ	8
20	Singapore	Christian Murchison	Ret	16			16	8	15	11			Ret	15	12	Ret	Ret	Ret							3
20	Singapore	Denis Lian			18	19																			3
21	Indonesia	Ananda Mikola	19	10	16	15	15	Ret	Ret	15	14	11	15	Ret	17	13	10	Ret	8	11	13	16			1
21	Indonesia	Moreno Soeprapto																					17	16	1
22	Pakistan	Nur Ali	20	Ret	20	Ret	21	Ret	18	21	20	15	18	18	20	Ret	18	10	15	21	20	18	Ret	17	1
23	Lebanon	Basil Shaaban	16	Ret			19	13			19	Ret													0
23	Lebanon	(United States) Graham Rahal			12	12																			0
23	Lebanon	Khalil Beschir							17	20															0
23	Lebanon	Alexander Khateeb											Ret	17	Ret	17									0
23	Lebanon	(Brazil) Allam Khodair															19	Ret	18	19	18	14	Ret	13	0
24	Greece	Takis Kaitatzis	18	15		Ret																			0
24	Greece	Nikos Zachos			19																				0
Pos	Team	Drivers	S	F	S	F	S	F	S	F	S	F	S	F	S	F	S	F	S	F	S	F	S	F	Pts
Pos	Team	Drivers	(Netherlands) NED		(Czech Republic) CZE		(China) BEI		(Malaysia) MLY		(Indonesia) INA		(New Zealand) NZL		(Australia) AUS		(South Africa) RSA		(Mexico) MEX		(China) SHA		(United Kingdom) GBR		Pts

Colour	Result
Gold	Winner
Silver	2nd place
Bronze	3rd place
Green	Finished, in points
Green	Retired, in points
Blue	Finished, no points
Purple	Did not finish (Ret)
Purple	Not classified (NC)
Red	Did not qualify (DNQ)
Black	Disqualified (DSQ)
White	Did not start (DNS)
White	Withdrew (WD)
Blank	Did not participate
Blank	Injured (INJ)
Blank	Excluded (EX)
**Bold**	Pole position
*	Fastest lap
spr	Sprint Race
fea	Feature Race
