= Enrico Toccacelo =

Italian racecar driver (born 1978)

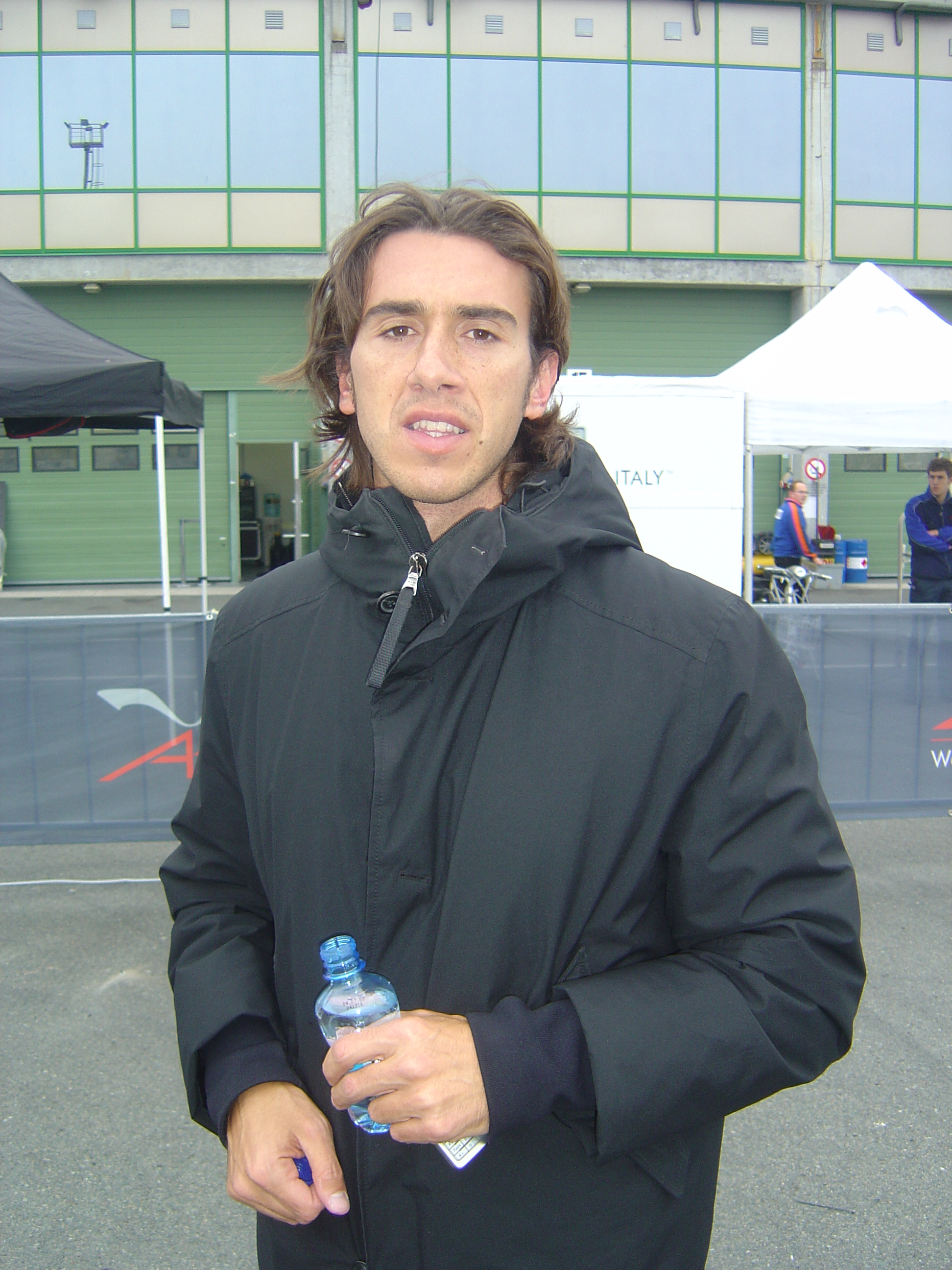
- Toccacelo in 2007
- Nationality: (Italy) Italian
- Born: 14 December 1978 (age 47) Rome, Italy

International GT Open career
- Debut season: 2010
- Current team: Racing Team EdilCris
- Car number: 9
- Starts: 32
- Wins: 4
- Podiums: 16
- Poles: 0
- Fastest laps: 0
- Best finish: 2nd in 2010

Previous series
- 2008 2007-08 2006-07 2007 2005-06 2006 2005 2005 2004 2003 2003 2002 2001 2001 2001 2000 1999 1998 1997: Superleague Formula; A1 Grand Prix; A1 Grand Prix; FIA GT Championship; A1 Grand Prix; World Series by Renault; World Series by Renault; Minardi F1 Test Driver; International Formula 3000; International Formula 3000; World Series by Nissan; International Formula 3000; ETCC; International Formula 3000; Formula Three Russia; Formula Three Germany; Formula Three Italy; Formula Three Italy; Formula Renault Campus Italy

Enrico Toccacelo (born 14 December 1978 in Rome) is an Italian former auto racer with karting, GT and Formula 3000 experience. He won three F3000 events and briefly led Vitantonio Liuzzi in the 2004 championship before Liuzzi went on to win the next three races. He finished runner-up, but, unable to land a Formula One seat, raced in the World Series by Renault series in 2005. From the 2005 Turkish Grand Prix, he was the third driver with Minardi, appearing in Friday practice sessions for three Grand Prix weekends.

Toccacelo raced in the inaugural season of A1 Grand Prix with A1 Team Italy, also appearing as a guest driver for A1 Team Pakistan after they were unable to find a driver at the South African round at Durban. In the second season of A1GP, Toccacelo was replaced by Alessandro Pier Guidi for the first two rounds, before appearing at the Beijing race, where he won the Feature race.

Toccacelo was also the driver of the A.S. Roma car in Superleague Formula for 2008 in rounds 1 to 3 and driver of rounds 4 to 5 for Borussia Dortmund.

== Racing record ==
=== Career summary ===
Season	Series	Team	Races	Wins	Poles	F.Laps	Podiums	Points	Position
1997	Formula Renault Campus Italy	?	?	?	?	?	?	?	4th
1998	Italian Formula Three Championship	EF Project	10	0	0	0	0	15	11th
1998	Masters of Formula 3	EF Project	1	0	0	0	0	0	19th
1999	Italian Formula Three Championship	Ravarotto Racing	18	5	6	5	8	207	**3rd**
1999	Masters of Formula 3	Ravarotto Racing	1	0	0	0	0	0	NC
1999	FIA European Formula 3 Cup	Ravarotto Racing	1	0	0	0	0	0	10th
2000	German Formula Three Championship	Prema Powerteam	18	1	3	0	6	125	7th
2000	Macau Grand Prix	Prema Powerteam	1	0	0	0	0	0	5th
2000	Korea Super Prix	Prema Powerteam	1	0	0	0	0	0	10th
2001	FIA International Formula 3000	Team Astromega	4	0	0	0	0	0	NC
2001	Macau Grand Prix	Bertram Schafer Racing	1	0	0	0	0	0	NC
2001	Korea Super Prix	Bertram Schafer Racing	1	0	0	0	0	0	21st
2001	Russian Formula Three Championship	ArtLine Engineering	3	1	1	2	3	12	12th
2001	European Super Touring Championship	Conrero	12	0	0	0	0	232	16th
2002	FIA International Formula 3000	Coloni F3000	12	1	0	0	1	14	9th
2003	FIA International Formula 3000	Super Nova Racing	10	1	0	0	2	30	6th
2003	World Series by Nissan	RC Motorsport	2	0	0	0	0	11	18th
2004	FIA International Formula 3000	BCN F3000	10	1	1	1	7	56	**2nd**
2005	Formula Renault 3.5 Series	Victory Engineering	9	1	1	0	1	36	12th
2005	Formula One	Minardi F1 Team	Test Driver						
2005–06	A1 Grand Prix	A1 Team Italy	16	0	0	0	2	46	14th
2006	Formula Renault 3.5 Series	EuroInternational	6	0	0	0	0	9	27th
2006–07	A1 Grand Prix	A1 Team Italy	18	1	0	1	4	52	7th
2007	FIA GT Championship	Aston Martin Racing BMS	6	0	0	0	0	2	24th
2007–08	A1 Grand Prix	A1 Team Italy	6	0	0	0	0	12	18th
2008	Superleague Formula	A.S. Roma	10	0	0	1	1	307	5th
2010	International GT Open	Racing Team EdilCris	16	2	0	0	8	191	**3rd**
2010	International GT Open - Super GT	Racing Team EdilCris	16	2	0	0	8	81	**2nd**
2011	Italian GT Championship	?	2	0	0	0	0	5	41st

=== Complete International Formula 3000 results ===
(key) (Races in bold indicate pole position) (Races in italics indicate fastest lap)

Year	Entrant	1	2	3	4	5	6	7	8	9	10	11	12	DC	Points
2001	Team Astromega	INT	IMO	CAT	A1R	MON	NUR	MAG	SIL	HOC; 13	HUN; Ret	SPA; 17	MNZ; Ret	NC	0
2002	Coloni F3000	INT; 6	IMO; 12	CAT; 6	A1R; 6	MON; Ret	NUR; Ret	SIL; 8	MAG; 6	HOC; Ret	HUN; 1	SPA; Ret	MNZ; Ret	9th	14
2003	Super Nova Racing	IMO; 5	CAT; 3	A1R; 5	MON; Ret	NUR; 1	MAG; 13	SIL; 6	HOC; Ret	HUN; 7	MNZ; 8			6th	30
2004	BCN F3000	IMO; 2	**CAT**; 2	MON; 2	NUR; 1	MAG; 12	SIL; 2	HOC; 2	HUN; 3	SPA; 12	MNZ; Ret			**2nd**	**56**

=== Complete Formula Renault 3.5 Series results ===
(key) (Races in bold indicate pole position) (Races in italics indicate fastest lap)

Year	Entrant	1	2	3	4	5	6	7	8	9	10	11	12	13	14	15	16	17	DC	Points
2005	Victory Engineering	**ZOL**; **1**; 1	ZOL; 2; 15†	MON; 1; 6	VAL; 1; 10	VAL; 2 Ret	LMS; 1; 6	LMS; 2; 9	BIL; 1; 5	BIL; 2; 20†	OSC; 1	OSC; 2	DON; 1	DON; 2	EST; 1	EST; 2	MNZ; 1	MNZ; 2	12th	36
2006	Eurointernational	ZOL; 1; 9	ZOL; 2; 8	MON; 1 DNQ	IST; 1; 15	IST; 2; 20	MIS; 1; 8	MIS; 2; 15	SPA; 1	SPA; 2	NÜR; 1	NÜR; 2	DON; 1	DON; 2	LMS; 1	LMS; 2	CAT; 1	CAT; 2	27th	9

^{†} Driver did not finish the race, but was classified as he completed more than 90% of the race distance.

=== Complete Formula One participations ===
(key)

Year	Team	Chassis	Engine	1	2	3	4	5	6	7	8	9	10	11	12	13	14	15	16	17	18	19	WDC	Points
2005	Minardi F1 Team	Minardi PS05	Cosworth V10	AUS	MAL	BHR	SMR	ESP	MON	EUR	CAN	USA	FRA	GBR	GER	HUN	TUR; TD	ITA; TD	BEL; TD	BRA *	JPN	CHN	-	-

- Toccacelo was not present in Brazil as he competed for the Italian team in the opening round of the A1 Grand Prix series at Brands Hatch.

=== Complete Superleague Formula results ===
(key) (Races in bold indicate pole position) (Races in italics indicate fastest lap)

Year	Team	Operator	1		2		3		4		5		6	Position	Points
2008	A.S. Roma	FMS International	DON		NÜR		ZOL							5th	307
2008	A.S. Roma	FMS International	2	10	17	**4**	13	7						5th	307
2008	Borussia Dortmund	Zakspeed							EST		VAL		JER	14th	218
2008	Borussia Dortmund	Zakspeed							17	6	18	**14**		14th	218

=== Complete A1 Grand Prix results ===
(key) (Races in bold indicate pole position) (Races in italics indicate fastest lap)

Year	Entrant	1	2	3	4	5	6	7	8	9	10	11	12	13	14	15	16	17	18	19	20	21	22	DC	Points
2005–06	Italy	GBR; SPR; 16	GBR; FEA; Ret	GER; SPR; 17	GER; FEA; Ret	POR; SPR; 11	POR; FEA; 7	AUS; SPR; 10	AUS; FEA; Ret	MYS; SPR; 17	MYS; FEA; 4	UAE; SPR; 2	UAE; FEA; 11	RSA; SPR; 11 †	RSA; FEA; Ret †	IDN; SPR	IDN; FEA	MEX; SPR; 3	MEX; FEA; 5	USA; SPR	USA; FEA	CHN; SPR; 16	CHN; FEA; 9	14th	46
2006–07	Italy	NED; SPR	NED; FEA	CZE; SPR	CZE; FEA	CHN; SPR; 3	CHN; FEA; 1	MYS; SPR; Ret	MYS; FEA; 13	IDN; SPR; 11	IDN; FEA; 4	NZL; SPR; 9	NZL; FEA; 8	AUS; SPR; 15	AUS; FEA; 12	RSA; SPR; 12	RSA; FEA; Ret	MEX; SPR; 7	MEX; FEA; 4	CHN; SPR; 10	CHN; FEA; 7	GBR; SPR; 3	GBR; SPR; 3	7th	52
2007–08	Italy	NED; SPR; 12	NED; FEA; 14	CZE; SPR; 14	CZE; FEA; 10	MYS; SPR; 8	MYS; FEA; Ret	CHN; SPR	CHN; FEA	NZL; SPR	NZL; FEA	AUS; SPR	AUS; FEA	RSA; SPR	RSA; FEA	MEX; SPR	MEX; FEA	CHN; SPR	CHN; FEA	GBR; SPR	GBR; SPR			18th	12

† Guest driver for Team Pakistan

Season	Series	Team	Races	Wins	Poles	Fast laps	Points	Pos.
2007-08	A1 Grand Prix	A1 Team Italy	6	0	0	0	4	18th (1)
2006-07	A1 Grand Prix	A1 Team Italy	18	1	0	1	47	7th (1)
2005-06	A1 Grand Prix	A1 Team Italy	16	0	0	0	37	14th (1)
2005-06	A1 Grand Prix	A1 Team Pakistan	2	0	0	0	10	20th (1)

*(1) = Team standings.
