= Salvador Durán =

Mexican racing driver

Salvador Durán Sánchez
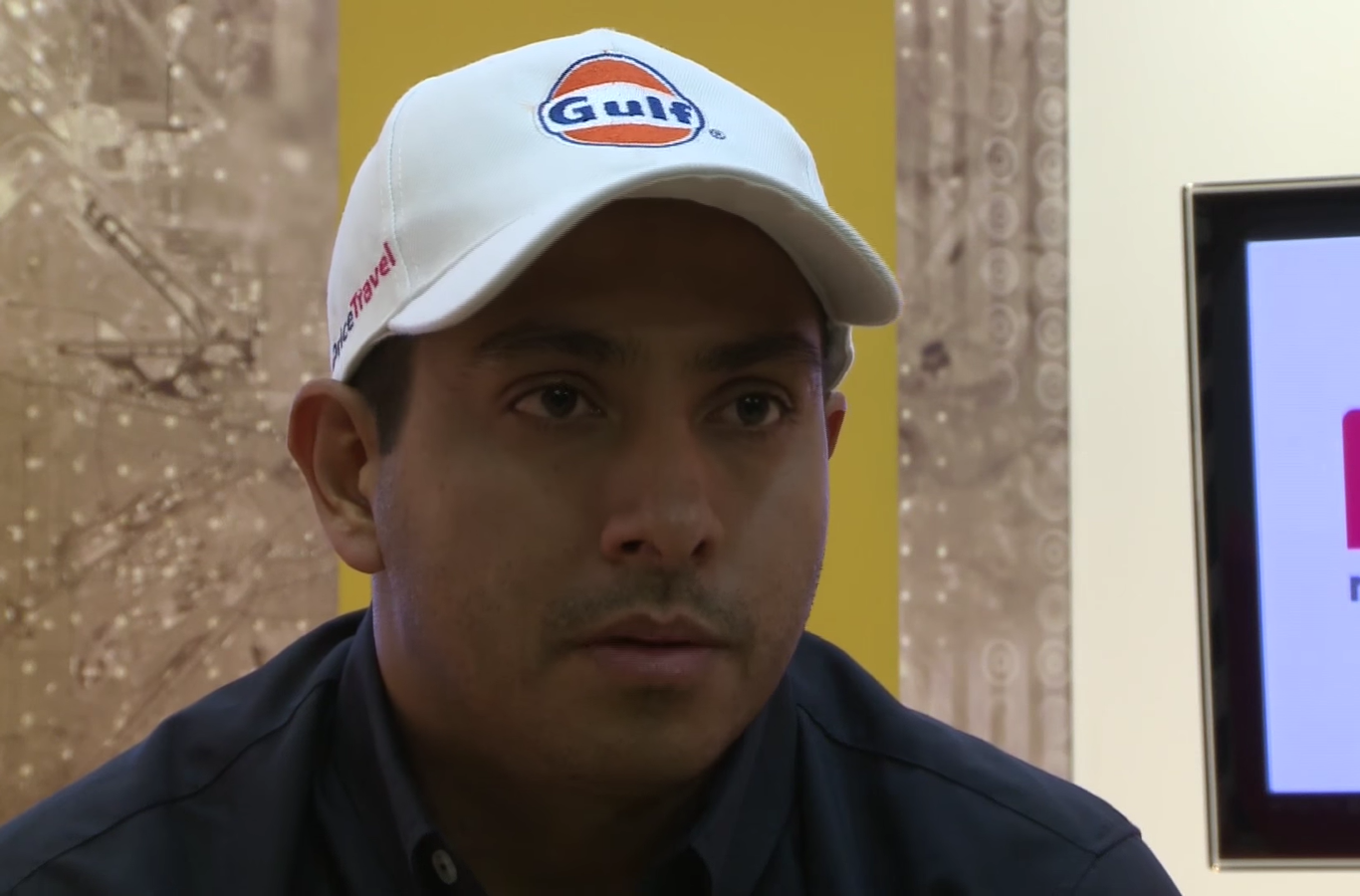
- Nationality: (Mexico) Mexican
- Born: Salvador Durán Sánchez; 6 May 1985 (age 41) Mexico City, Mexico

FIA Formula E career
- Debut season: 2014–15
- Current team: Team Aguri
- Categorisation: FIA Gold
- Car number: 10
- Former teams: Trulli GP
- Starts: 12
- Wins: 0
- Poles: 0
- Fastest laps: 0
- Best finish: 21st in 2014–15

Previous series
- 2002 2003 2003 2003 2004 2004 2005–06 2005–06–2008–09 2007–08 2007–10 2010, 2012: Formula Renault Monza; Barber Dodge Pro Series; FR2.0 Fran-Am; Formula Dodge; Italian Formula Renault; Formula Renault Eurocup; British Formula Three; A1 Grand Prix; Rolex Sports Car Series; Formula Renault 3.5 Series; NASCAR Corona Series

Championship titles
- 2005: British F3 Scholarship Class

Salvador Durán Sánchez (born 6 May 1985) is a Mexican auto racing driver who raced in the FIA Formula E Championship for the Amlin Aguri team. Durán has also previously competed in A1 Grand Prix, Formula Renault 3.5, and the NASCAR Toyota Series.

== Career ==
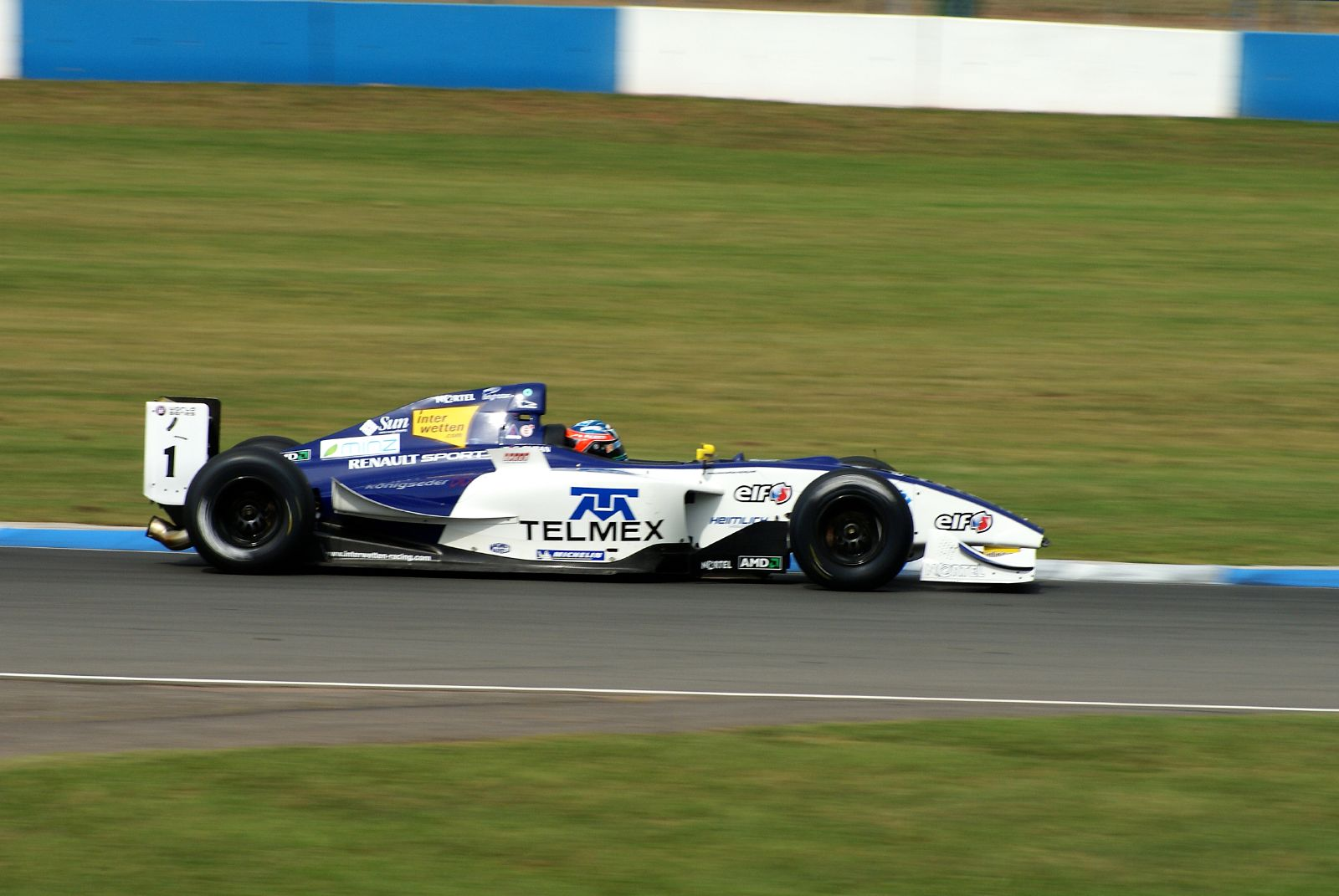
Durán driving for Interwetten.com at the Donington Park round of the 2007 Formula Renault 3.5 Series season.

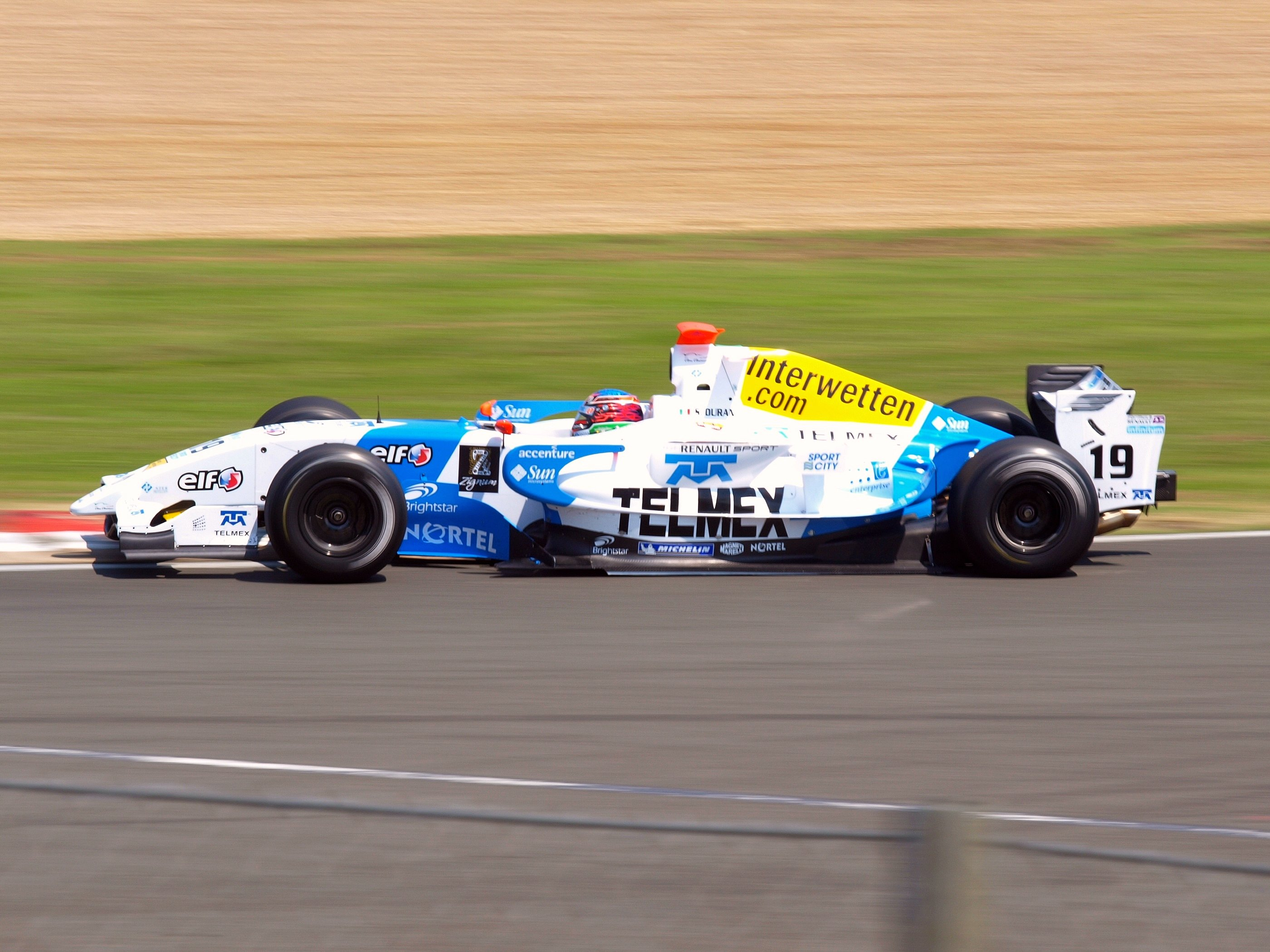
Durán driving for Interwetten.com at the Silverstone round of the 2008 Formula Renault 3.5 Series season.

Born in Mexico City, Durán started his career in 2002 with a second place in the Skip Barber National and winning the Midwestern Champion trophy. In 2003, he finished eighth in Italian Formula Renault and 15th in the Formula Renault Eurocup. In 2004 and 2005, he drove in the British F3 International Series National Class with P1 Motorsport, becoming class winner in 2005.

On the back of this success, Durán signed up for the 2005-06 A1 Grand Prix season, contesting some of the race weekends for Team Mexico, winning both races of the USA round at Laguna Seca.

For the 2006 British F3 International Series, Durán moved up to the Championship Class, with Hitech Racing, finishing tenth in the championship, scoring 54 points, with his best result a fourth place at Silverstone.

Durán then went on to commit to the second season of A1 Grand Prix. He also was a member of the winning team for Chip Ganassi Racing in the 2007 24 Hours of Daytona, along with teammates Juan Pablo Montoya and Scott Pruett.

Durán raced 2009 for the Mexican A1GP team the last four races having in the last race a top-three as best result and making Mexico enter the top-ten in the championship, he raced in the 2010 NASCAR Mexico Series for Citizen-DHL team having a pole position and two top-three finishes he ended up out of the top-20 and was excluded in three races.

In December 2014, Amlin Aguri announced that Durán would drive for them in the 2014 Punta del Este ePrix in Uruguay, the third round of the 2014 Formula E season. He replaced Katherine Legge, who was testing at Daytona.

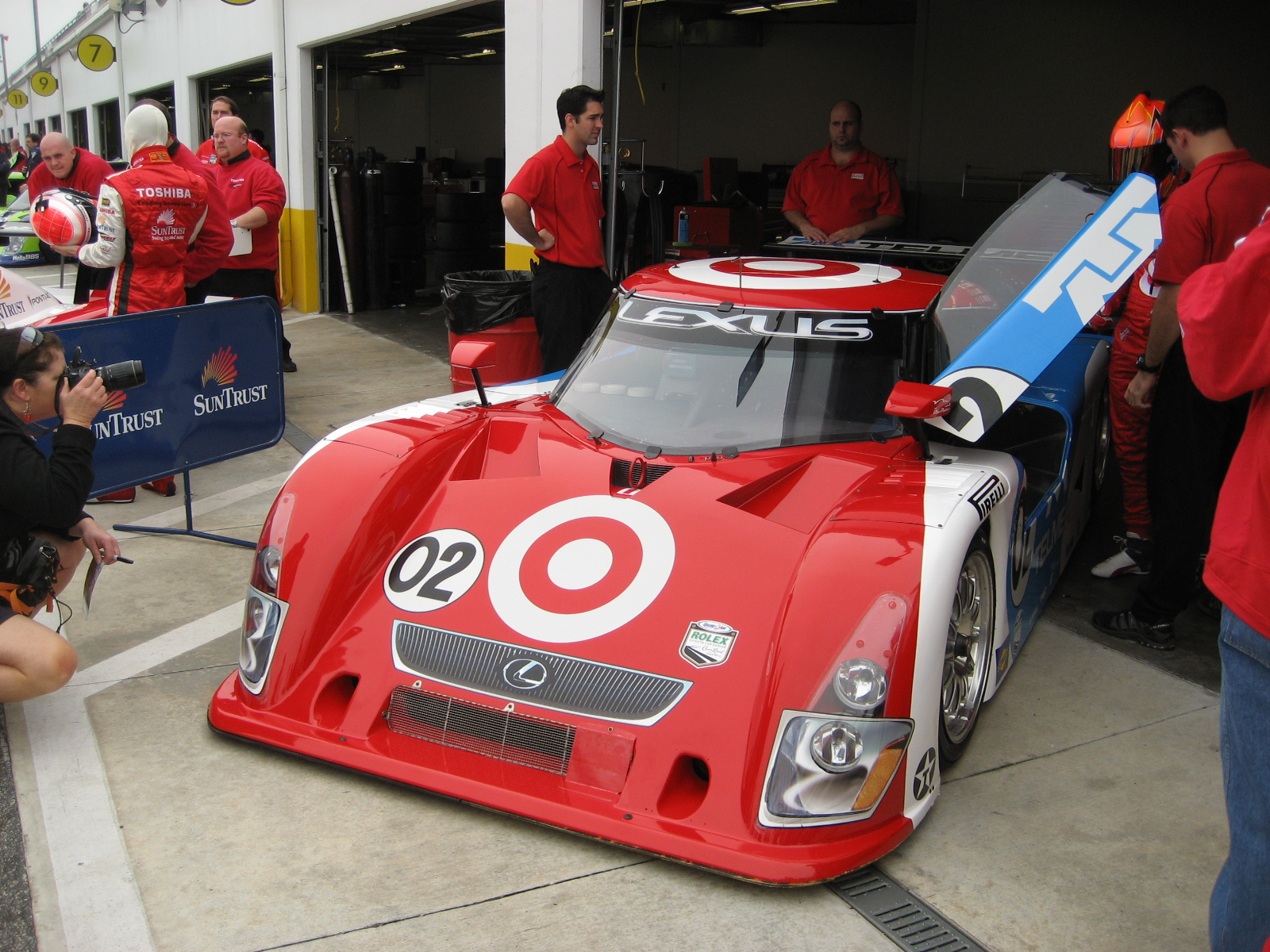
The No. 2 Riley-Lexus Durán shared with Scott Dixon, Alex Lloyd and Dan Wheldon at the 2008 24 Hours of Daytona

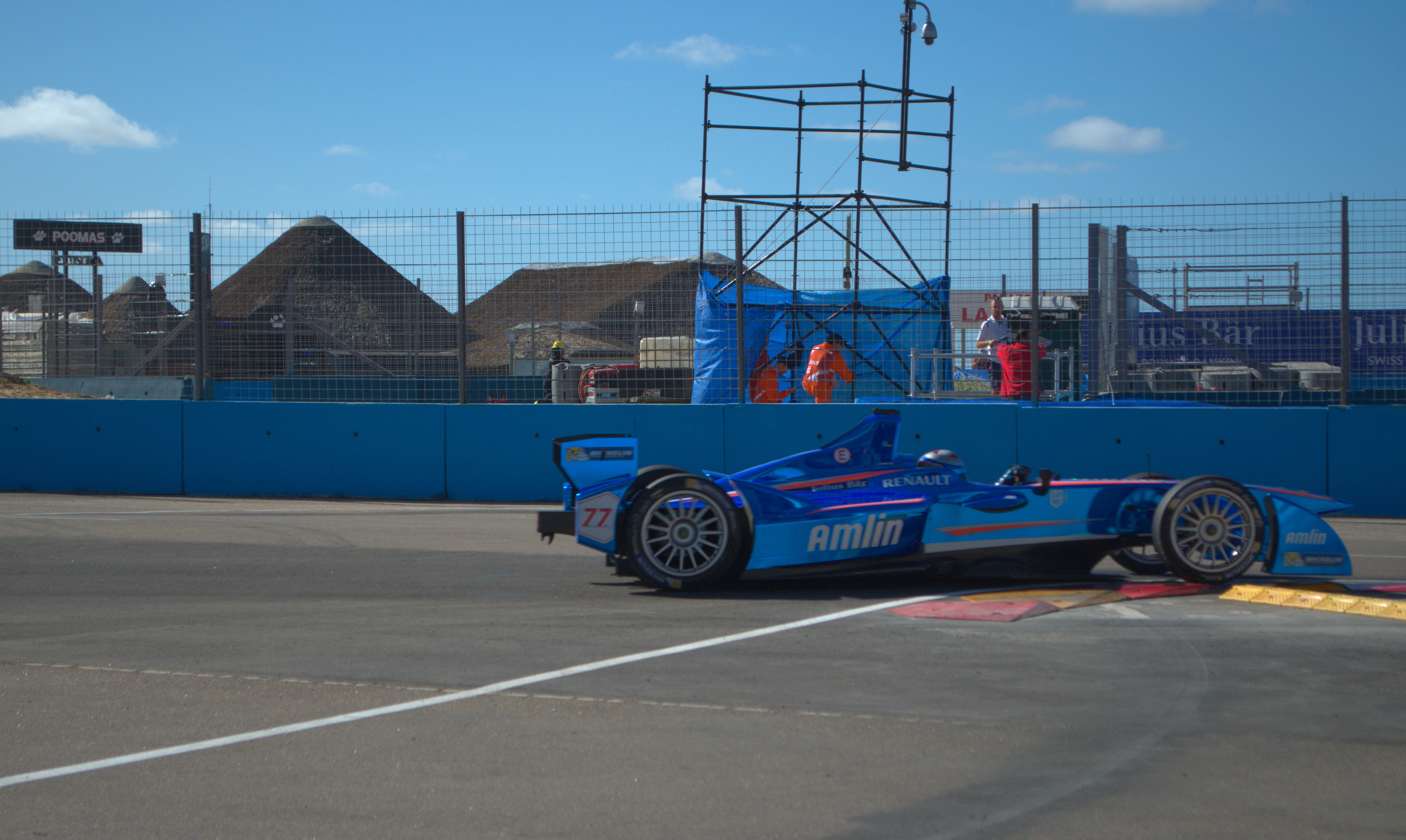
During the Punta del Este.

For the 2015–16 Formula E season, Durán signed with Trulli GP, but after the team's withdrawal from the formula after the first three rounds of the championship (in which they not competed), he rejoined Team Aguri. Following the next three races, at the Paris ePrix, Durán was replaced by Chinese driver Ma Qing Hua, who stayed on the team for the remainder of the season.

== Racing record ==
=== Career summary ===
Season	Series	Team name	Races	Wins	Poles	Points	Position
2002	Formula Renault Monza	Fast Wheels Competition	?	?	?	2	25th
2003	Ford Mustang Championship Mexico	Telmex	?	?	?	0	NC
2003	Formula Dodge National Championship	Skip Barber Racing School	13	2	5	162	**2nd**
2003	Barber Dodge Pro Series	Skip Barber Racing School	3	0	0	17	21st
2003	North American Fran Am 2000	GTI Formula Motorsports	?	?	?	18	30th
2004	Formula Renault 2000 Italia	Cram Competition	17	0	0	115	8th
2004	Formula Renault 2000 Eurocup	Cram Competition	15	0	0	20	18th
2005	British Formula 3 International Series - National	P1 Motorsport	22	9	9	300	**1st**
2005–06	A1 Grand Prix	A1 Team Mexico	16	2	1	59	10th†
2006	British Formula 3 International Series	Hitech Racing	19	0	0	54	10th
2006	Masters of Formula 3	Hitech Racing	1	0	0	N/A	23rd
2006–07	A1 Grand Prix	A1 Team Mexico	18	0	0	35†	10th†
2007	Rolex Sports Car Series - DP	Chip Ganassi Racing	2	1	0	57	45th
2007	Formula Renault 3.5 Series	Interwetten.com	17	1	1	64	9th
2007–08	A1 Grand Prix	A1 Team Mexico	2	0	0	22†	16th†
2008	Formula Renault 3.5 Series	Interwetten.com	15	1	0	61	9th
2008	Rolex Sports Car Series - DP	Chip Ganassi Racing	1	0	0	13	60th
2008–09	A1 Grand Prix	A1 Team Mexico	8	0	0	8†	13th†
2009	Formula Renault 3.5 Series	Interwetten.com Racing	2	0	0	0	35th
2010	Formula Renault 3.5 Series	FHV Interwetten.com	2	0	0	0	NC
2010	NASCAR Corona Series	HO Speed Racing	13	0	1	1400	23rd
2012	NASCAR Toyota Series	Equipo Telcel	14	0	0	410	15th
2014–15	Formula E	Amlin Aguri	9	0	0	13	21st
2015–16	Formula E	Trulli GP	1	0	0	0	22nd
2015–16	Formula E	Team Aguri	3	0	0	0	22nd
2018–19	Jaguar I-Pace eTrophy	Jaguar VIP Car	1	0	0	0	NC‡
2020–21	Formula E	NIO 333 FE Team	Reserve driver				

^{†} Team standings.
^{‡} As Durán was a guest driver, he was ineligible to score points.

=== American Open-Wheel racing results ===
(key)

==== Barber Dodge Pro Series ====
Year	1	2	3	4	5	6	7	8	9	10	Rank	Points
2003	STP	MTY	MIL	LAG	POR	CLE	TOR	VAN; 17	MDO; 10	MTL; 5	**21st**	**17**

=== Complete A1 Grand Prix results ===
(key) (Races in bold indicate pole position; races in italics indicate fastest lap)

Year	Entrant	1	2	3	4	5	6	7	8	9	10	11	12	13	14	15	16	17	18	19	20	21	22	DC	Points
2005–06	Mexico	GBR; SPR; 6	GBR; FEA; 3	GER; SPR	GER; FEA	POR; SPR; Ret	POR; FEA; Ret	AUS; SPR; Ret	AUS; FEA; Ret	MYS; SPR	MYS; FEA	UAE; SPR; 18	UAE; FEA; 8	RSA; SPR	RSA; FEA	IDN; SPR; 3	IDN; FEA; Ret	MEX; SPR; Ret	MEX; FEA; Ret	USA; SPR; 1	**USA**; **FEA**; 1	CHN; SPR; 3	CHN; FEA; 8	10th	59
2006–07	Mexico	NED; SPR; 2	NED; FEA; 5	CZE; SPR; 7	CZE; FEA; 3	BEI; SPR; 2	BEI; FEA; Ret	MYS; SPR; 11	MYS; FEA; Ret	IDN; SPR; 2	IDN; FEA; 6	NZL; SPR; 12	NZL; FEA; Ret	AUS; SPR; 11	AUS; FEA; 15	RSA; SPR; Ret	RSA; FEA; Ret	MEX; SPR; 17	MEX; FEA; Ret	SHA; SPR	SHA; FEA	GBR; SPR	GBR; SPR	10th	35
2007–08	Mexico	NED; SPR; 4	NED; FEA; 4	CZE; SPR	CZE; FEA	MYS; SPR	MYS; FEA	ZHU; SPR	ZHU; FEA	NZL; SPR	NZL; FEA	AUS; SPR	AUS; FEA	RSA; SPR	RSA; FEA	MEX; SPR	MEX; FEA	SHA; SPR	SHA; FEA	GBR; SPR	GBR; SPR			16th	22
2008–09	Mexico	NED; SPR	NED; FEA	CHN; SPR	CHN; FEA	MYS; SPR	MYS; FEA	NZL; SPR; 15	NZL; FEA; Ret	RSA; SPR; 16	RSA; FEA; Ret	POR; SPR; 9	POR; FEA; 4	GBR; SPR; 3	GBR; SPR; 6									13th	19

=== Complete Formula Renault 3.5 Series results ===
(key) (Races in bold indicate pole position; races in italics indicate fastest lap)

Year	Entrant	1	2	3	4	5	6	7	8	9	10	11	12	13	14	15	16	17	DC	Points
2007	Interwetten.com	MNZ; 1; 9	MNZ; 2; 1	NÜR; 1 Ret	NÜR; 2; 26	MON; 1; 3	HUN; 1; 16	HUN; 2 Ret	SPA; 1; 4	SPA; 2; 3	DON; 1; 17	DON; 2; 8	MAG; 1 Ret	MAG; 2; 22	EST; 1; 19	EST; 2; 17	**CAT**; **1**; 2	CAT; 2; 7	8th	64
2008	Interwetten.com	MNZ; 1 Ret	MNZ; 2; 14	SPA; 1; 2	SPA; 2; 4	MON; 1; 16	SIL; 1; 1	SIL; 2; 3	HUN; 1 Ret	HUN; 2; 16	NÜR; 1; 4	NÜR; 2 DSQ	BUG; 1; 7	BUG; 2; 7	EST; 1; 16	EST; 2; 22	CAT; 1 Ret	CAT; 2; 12	9th	61
2009	Interwetten.com	CAT; 1	CAT; 2	SPA; 1	SPA; 2	MON; 1	HUN; 1	HUN; 2	SIL; 1	SIL; 2	BUG; 1	BUG; 2	ALG; 1	ALG; 2	NÜR; 1 DNS	NÜR; 2; 16	ALC; 1; 16	ALC; 2 Ret	35th	0
2010	FHV Interwetten.com	ALC; 1	ALC; 2	SPA; 1	SPA; 2	MON; 1	BRN; 1	BRN; 2	MAG; 1	MAG; 2	HUN; 1	HUN; 2	HOC; 1	HOC; 2	SIL; 1	SIL; 2	CAT; 1 NC	CAT; 2 Ret	NC	0

=== 24 Hours of Daytona ===
Year	Team	No	Car	Co-Drivers	Laps	Class	Pos.	Class Pos.
2007	(United States) Telmex Chip Ganassi Racing	01	Riley MkXI-Lexus	(Colombia) Juan Pablo Montoya (United States) Scott Pruett	668	DP	**1**	**1**
2008	(United States) Chip Ganassi Racing	02	Riley MkXI-Lexus	(United Kingdom) Dan Wheldon (New Zealand) Scott Dixon (United Kingdom) Alex Lloyd	515	DP	17	44

=== Complete Formula E results ===
(key) (Races in bold indicate pole position; races in italics indicate fastest lap)

Year	Team	Chassis	Powertrain	1	2	3	4	5	6	7	8	9	10	11	Pos	Points
2014–15	Amlin Aguri	Spark SRT01-e	SRT01-e	BEI	PUT	PDE; 16	BUE; DSQ	MIA; 10	LBH; Ret	MCO; Ret	BER; 16	MSC; 6	LDN; 17	LDN; 8	21st	13
2015–16	Trulli Formula E Team	Spark SRT01-e	Motomatica JT-01	BEI; DNP	PUT	PDE									22nd	0
2015–16	Team Aguri	Spark SRT01-e	SRT01-e				BUE; Ret	MEX; 15	LBH; 14	PAR	BER	LDN	LDN		22nd	0
