= 2005–06 A1 Grand Prix season =

A1 Grand Prix season

2005–06 A1 Grand Prix of Nations

Champions
- Champions: France

Seasons
- ← none 2006–07 →

The 2005–06 A1 Grand Prix season was the inaugural season for the A1 Grand Prix series. It began on 25 September 2005, and finished on 2 April 2006 after eleven races.

== Calendar ==
The first A1 Grand Prix season consisted of 11 rounds, all held in different countries. Each event ran over a three-day weekend, including a practice session on each of Friday and Saturday before a qualifying session on Saturday and two races on Sunday.

Round	Event	Circuit	Dates
1	(United Kingdom) A1 Grand Prix of Nations, Great Britain	Brands Hatch	23–25 September 2005
2	A1 Grand Prix of Nations, Germany	EuroSpeedway Lausitz	7–9 October 2005
3	A1 Grand Prix of Nations, Portugal	Circuito do Estoril	21–23 October 2005
4	A1 Grand Prix of Nations, Australia	Eastern Creek Raceway	4–6 November 2005
5	A1 Grand Prix of Nations, Malaysia	Sepang International Circuit	18–20 November 2005
6	A1 Grand Prix of Nations, United Arab Emirates	Dubai Autodrome	9–11 December 2005
7	A1 Grand Prix of Nations, South Africa	Durban Street Circuit	27–29 January 2006
8	A1 Grand Prix of Nations, Indonesia	Sentul International Circuit	10–12 February 2006
9	A1 Grand Prix of Nations, Mexico	Fundidora Park	24–26 February 2006
10	A1 Grand Prix of Nations, United States	Laguna Seca	10–12 March 2006
11	A1 Grand Prix of Nations, China	Shanghai International Circuit	31 March–2 April 2006
Cancelled events
–	A1 Grand Prix of Nations, Brazil	Autódromo Internacional de Curitiba	10–12 February 2006
Map
2005–06 A1 Grand Prix season is located in Earth

=== Calendar changes ===
- A race was scheduled to be held in Brazil at the Autódromo Internacional de Curitiba over the weekend of 10–12 February 2006, but was later cancelled.
- The Indonesian round had originally been scheduled to be held over 13–15 January 2006, but was postponed due to the death of Sheikh Maktoum bin Rashid Al Maktoum. The replacement date was set as 10–12 February 2006.

== Entry list ==
25 teams, each representing a different country, signed up for the first A1 Grand Prix season. All teams used a control chassis (Lola A1GP), engine (Zytek) and tyre (Cooper Avon). The following teams competed in the 2005–06 championship:

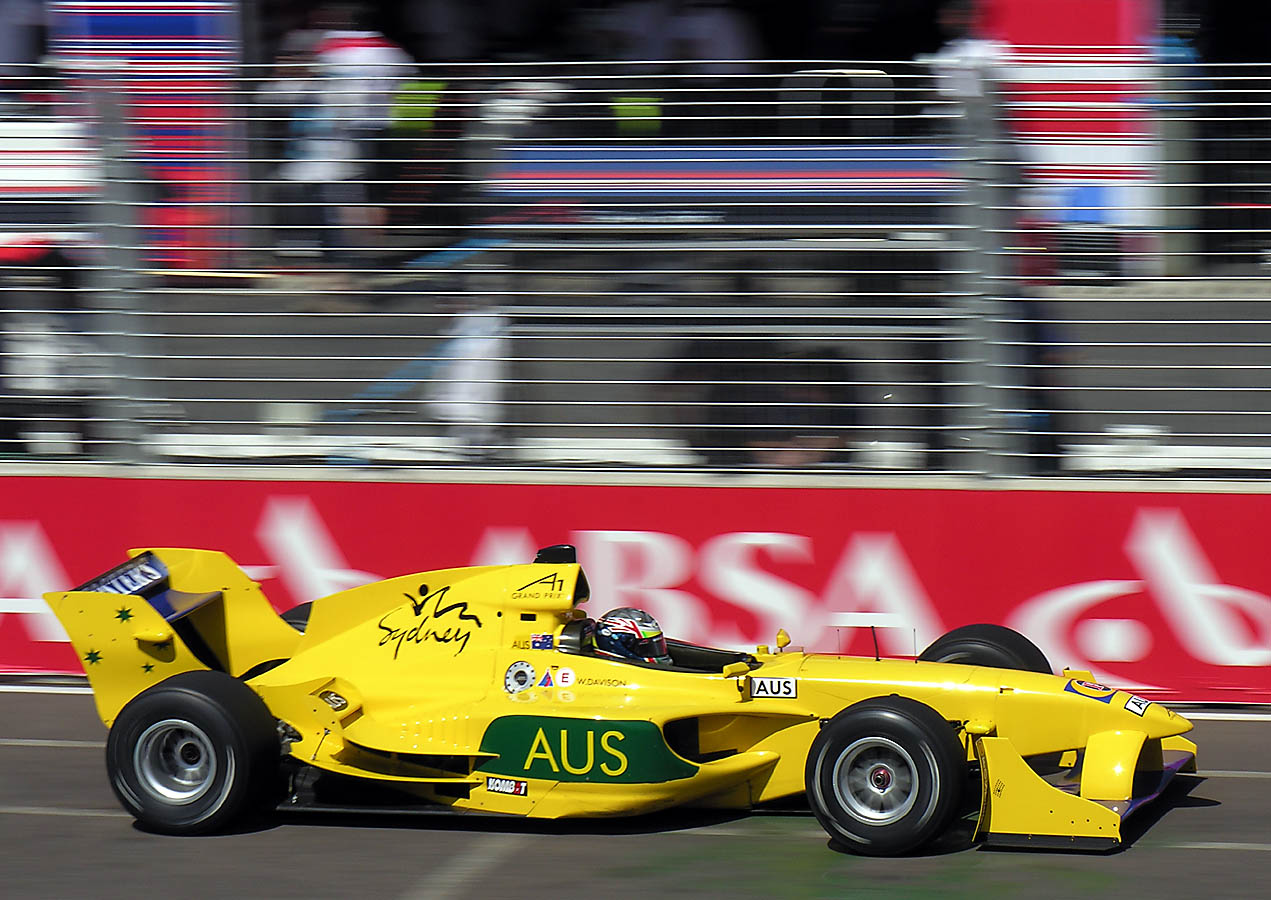
A1 Team Australia used the most drivers of any team in the inaugural season, with five.

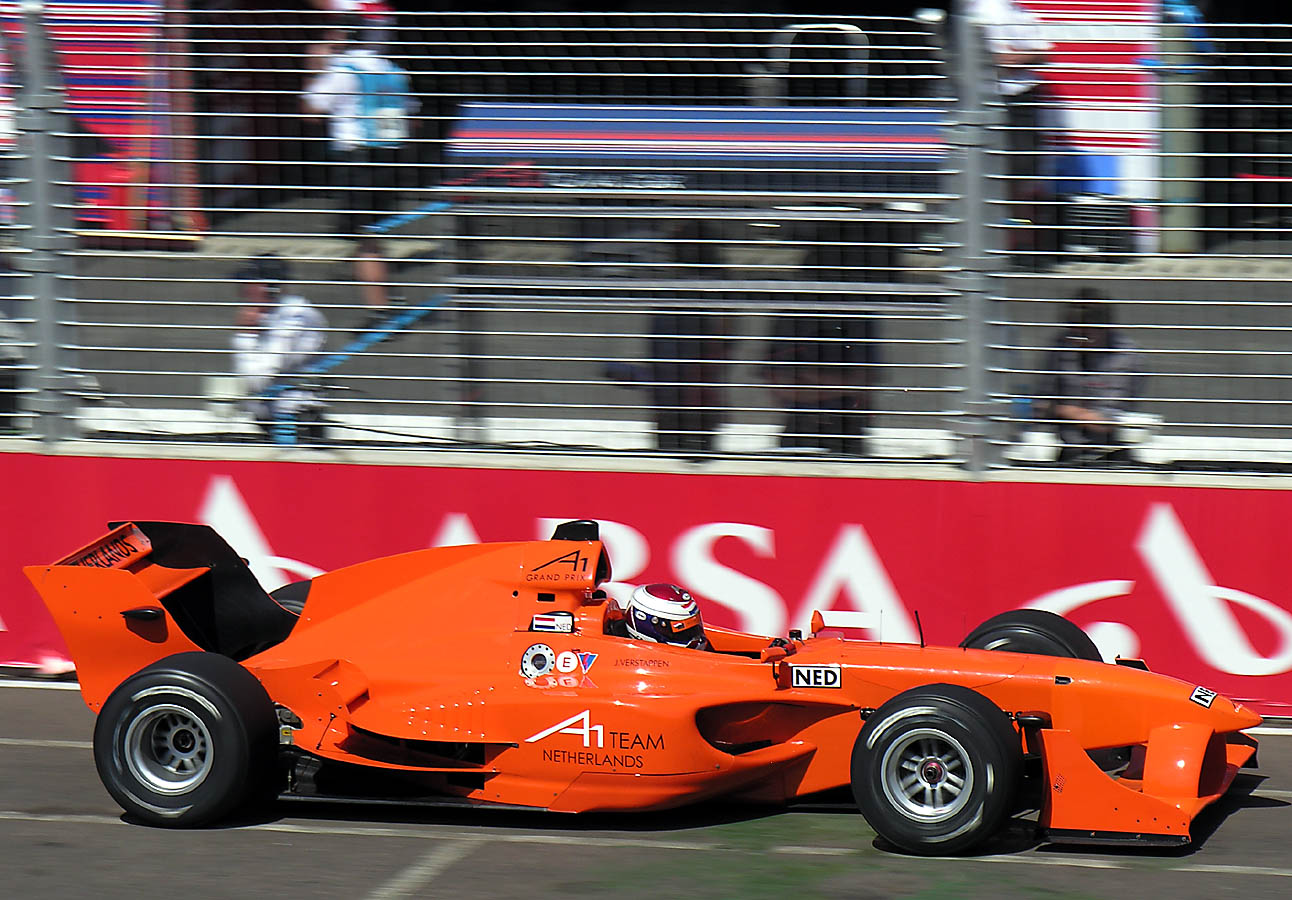
Jos Verstappen on his way to victory at the South African round.

Entrant (Team)	Driver	Events
(Australia) A1 Team Australia; Alan Docking Racing	Will Power	1
(Australia) A1 Team Australia; Alan Docking Racing	Christian Jones	2, 6, 9
(Australia) A1 Team Australia; Alan Docking Racing	Will Davison	3–7
(Australia) A1 Team Australia; Alan Docking Racing	Marcus Marshall	8
(Australia) A1 Team Australia; Alan Docking Racing	Ryan Briscoe	10–11
(Austria) A1 Team Austria; Team Rosberg	Mathias Lauda	1–8, 10–11
(Austria) A1 Team Austria; Team Rosberg	Patrick Friesacher	9
(Brazil) A1 Team Brazil; ART Grand Prix	Nelson Piquet, Jr.	1–7
(Brazil) A1 Team Brazil; ART Grand Prix	Christian Fittipaldi	8–11
(Canada) A1 Team Canada; John Village Automotive	Sean McIntosh	1–8
(Canada) A1 Team Canada; John Village Automotive	Patrick Carpentier	9–11
(China) A1 Team China; Team Astromega	Tengyi Jiang	All
(China) A1 Team China; Team Astromega	Qinghua Ma	1, 9, 11
A1 Team Czech Republic; Charouz Racing System	Jan Charouz	1
A1 Team Czech Republic; Charouz Racing System	Tomáš Enge	2–11
(France) A1 Team France; DAMS	Alexandre Prémat	1, 3, 5, 7, 9, 11
(France) A1 Team France; DAMS	Nicolas Lapierre	2, 4, 6, 8, 10–11
(Germany) A1 Team Germany; Super Nova Racing	Timo Scheider	1–2, 5, 7–10
(Germany) A1 Team Germany; Super Nova Racing	Adrian Sutil	3–4, 6
(Germany) A1 Team Germany; Super Nova Racing	Sebastian Stahl	11
(United Kingdom) A1 Team Great Britain; Arden International	Robbie Kerr	1–10
(United Kingdom) A1 Team Great Britain; Arden International	Darren Manning	11
(India) A1 Team India; Akbar Ebrahim	Karun Chandhok	1–2
(India) A1 Team India; Akbar Ebrahim	Armaan Ebrahim	3–8
A1 Team Indonesia	Ananda Mikola	1–3, 5–11
(Republic of Ireland) A1 Team Ireland; Status Grand Prix	Michael Devaney	1, 4, 11
(Republic of Ireland) A1 Team Ireland; Status Grand Prix	Ralph Firman	2–3, 5–10
(Italy) A1 Team Italy; Team Ghinzani	Enrico Toccacelo	1–6, 9, 11
(Italy) A1 Team Italy; Team Ghinzani	Massimiliano Busnelli	7–8
(Italy) A1 Team Italy; Team Ghinzani	Max Papis	10
(Japan) A1 Team Japan; Carlin Motorsport	Ryo Fukuda	1
(Japan) A1 Team Japan; Carlin Motorsport	Hideki Noda	2
(Japan) A1 Team Japan; Carlin Motorsport	Hayanari Shimoda	4–6, 8–9
(Lebanon) A1 Team Lebanon; Carlin Motorsport	Khalil Beschir	1–2, 5
(Lebanon) A1 Team Lebanon; Carlin Motorsport	Basil Shaaban	1, 3–4, 6–8
(Lebanon) A1 Team Lebanon; Carlin Motorsport	(United States) Graham Rahal	9–11
A1 Team Malaysia	Fairuz Fauzy	1, 3, 5
A1 Team Malaysia	Alex Yoong	1–2, 4–11
(Mexico) A1 Team Mexico; DAMS	Salvador Durán	1, 3–4, 6, 8–11
(Mexico) A1 Team Mexico; DAMS	David Martínez	2, 7
(Mexico) A1 Team Mexico; DAMS	Luis Díaz	5
(Netherlands) A1 Team Netherlands; Racing for Holland	Jos Verstappen	All
(New Zealand) A1 Team New Zealand; West Surrey Racing	Matthew Halliday	1, 3, 5–11
(New Zealand) A1 Team New Zealand; West Surrey Racing	Jonny Reid	2, 4
(Pakistan) A1 Team Pakistan; Super Nova Racing	Adam Khan	1–7, 10–11
(Pakistan) A1 Team Pakistan; Super Nova Racing	(Italy) Enrico Toccacelo	7
(Portugal) A1 Team Portugal; Carlin Motorsport	Álvaro Parente	1–10
(Portugal) A1 Team Portugal; Carlin Motorsport	César Campaniço	11
(Russia) A1 Team Russia; Russian Age Racing	Aleksey Vasilyev	1
(Russia) A1 Team Russia; Russian Age Racing	Mikhail Aleshin	3
(Russia) A1 Team Russia; Russian Age Racing	Roman Rusinov	4
(South Africa) A1 Team South Africa; BCN Competicion	Stephen Simpson	1, 4–11
(South Africa) A1 Team South Africa; BCN Competicion	Tomas Scheckter	2–3
(Switzerland) A1 Team Switzerland; DAMS	Neel Jani	1–9
(Switzerland) A1 Team Switzerland; DAMS	Giorgio Mondini	10–11
(United States) A1 Team USA; David Price Racing	Scott Speed	1–3
(United States) A1 Team USA; David Price Racing	Bryan Herta	4–5, 9–10
(United States) A1 Team USA; David Price Racing	Philip Giebler	6–8, 11

=== Mid-season changes ===
- Enrico Toccacelo replaced Adam Khan at A1 Team Pakistan in Durban after the latter was injured in a practice session. As Toccacelo is not Pakistani, he was ineligible to score points for the team.
- A1 Team Indonesia was unable to participate in Australia as the team did not find a replacement driver for Ananda Mikola.

== Results and standings ==
=== Results summary ===
Round		Event	Pole position	Fastest lap	Winner	Report
1	S	(United Kingdom) Great Britain	(Brazil) Nelson Piquet Jr.	(France) Alexandre Prémat	(Brazil) Nelson Piquet Jr.	Report
1	F	(United Kingdom) Great Britain		(Brazil) Nelson Piquet Jr.	(Brazil) Nelson Piquet Jr.	Report
2	S	Germany	(France) Nicolas Lapierre	(Brazil) Nelson Piquet Jr.	(France) Nicolas Lapierre	Report
2	F	Germany		(Brazil) Nelson Piquet Jr.	(France) Nicolas Lapierre	Report
3	S	Portugal	(Brazil) Nelson Piquet Jr.	(France) Alexandre Prémat	(France) Alexandre Prémat	Report
3	F	Portugal		(France) Alexandre Prémat	(France) Alexandre Prémat	Report
4	S	Australia	(France) Nicolas Lapierre	(France) Nicolas Lapierre	(France) Nicolas Lapierre	Report
4	F	Australia		(France) Nicolas Lapierre	(France) Nicolas Lapierre	Report
5	S	Malaysia	(Switzerland) Neel Jani	(France) Alexandre Prémat	(France) Alexandre Prémat	Report
5	F	Malaysia		(Netherlands) Jos Verstappen	(France) Alexandre Prémat	Report
6	S	United Arab Emirates	(Switzerland) Neel Jani	(Switzerland) Neel Jani	(Switzerland) Neel Jani	Report
6	F	United Arab Emirates		(Republic of Ireland) Ralph Firman	(France) Nicolas Lapierre	Report
7	S	South Africa	(France) Alexandre Prémat	(Republic of Ireland) Ralph Firman	(France) Alexandre Prémat	Report
7	F	South Africa		(Brazil) Nelson Piquet Jr.	(Netherlands) Jos Verstappen	Report
8	S	Indonesia	(United Kingdom) Robbie Kerr	(France) Nicolas Lapierre	(France) Nicolas Lapierre	Report
8	F	Indonesia		(Republic of Ireland) Ralph Firman	(Canada) Sean McIntosh	Report
9	S	Mexico	(France) Alexandre Prémat	(Netherlands) Jos Verstappen	(France) Alexandre Prémat	Report
9	F	Mexico		(France) Alexandre Prémat	(France) Alexandre Prémat	Report
10	S	United States	(Mexico) Salvador Durán	(Mexico) Salvador Durán	(Mexico) Salvador Durán	Report
10	F	United States		(France) Nicolas Lapierre	(Mexico) Salvador Durán	Report
11	S	China	(Malaysia) Alex Yoong	(Malaysia) Alex Yoong	(Malaysia) Alex Yoong	Report
11	F	China		(Mexico) Salvador Durán	(Czech Republic) Tomáš Enge	Report

=== Championship standings ===
Pos	Team	Drivers	(United Kingdom) GBR		(Germany) GER		(Portugal) POR		(Australia) AUS		(Malaysia) MYS		(United Arab Emirates) UAE		(South Africa) RSA		(Indonesia) INA		(Mexico) MEX		(United States) USA		(China) CHN		Pts
Pos	Team	Drivers	S	F	S	F	S	F	S	F	S	F	S	F	S	F	S	F	S	F	S	F	S	F	Pts
1	France	Alexandre Prémat	2	DNS			1	1			1	1			**1**	8			**1**	1			7		172
1	France	Nicolas Lapierre			**1**	1			**1**	1			7	1			1	8			2	Ret		6	172
2	Switzerland	Neel Jani	9	Ret	2	5	3	2	6	3	**2**	2	**1**	Ret	3	2	5	5	2	3					121
2	Switzerland	Giorgio Mondini																			16	13	Ret	Ret	121
3	(United Kingdom) Great Britain	Robbie Kerr	5	Ret	Ret	2	Ret	12	5	2	3	Ret	9	2	2	Ret	**2**	10	11	6	4	3			97
3	(United Kingdom) Great Britain	Darren Manning																					2	15	97
4	New Zealand	Matthew Halliday	3	4			14	16			6	6	15	13	6	4	8	7	Ret	8	8	12	8	4	77
4	New Zealand	Jonny Reid			4	4			14	8															77
5	Malaysia	Fairuz Fauzy	13				8	Ret			8														74
5	Malaysia	Alex Yoong		5	6	16			8	5	QO	5	10	Ret	Ret	Ret	4	2	7	11	Ret	10	**1**	2	74
6	Brazil	Nelson Piquet, Jr.	**1**	1	3	Ret	**2**	8	3	9	4	10	Ret	Ret	Ret	9									71
6	Brazil	Christian Fittipaldi															20	4	14	12	13	Ret	10	Ret	71
7	Netherlands	Jos Verstappen	Ret	7	Ret	7	4	Ret	7	4	5	16	11	9	16	1	7	6	4	2	14	Ret	Ret	17	69
8	(Republic of Ireland) Ireland	Michael Devaney	10	Ret					4	14													4	Ret	68
8	(Republic of Ireland) Ireland	Ralph Firman			9	6	19	3			7	9	4	Ret	4	Ret	6	Ret	Ret	Ret	5	6			68
9	Portugal	Álvaro Parente	8	Ret	Ret	11	6	5	2	7	9	18	8	4	8	3	19	Ret	Ret	10	3	4			66
9	Portugal	César Campaniço																					13	12	66
10	Mexico	Salvador Durán	6	3			Ret	Ret	Ret	Ret			18	8			3	Ret	Ret	Ret	1	**1**	3	8	59
10	Mexico	David Martínez			8	13									10	Ret									59
10	Mexico	Luis Díaz									19	15													59
11	Canada	Sean McIntosh	19	9	7	3	7	Ret	9	Ret	15	Ret	5	6	12	10	Ret	1							59
11	Canada	Patrick Carpentier																	9	15	6	5	Ret	7	59
12	Czech Republic	Jan Charouz	18	Ret																					56
12	Czech Republic	Tomáš Enge			11	Ret	5	9	Ret	Ret	16	3	3	Ret	5	Ret	10	13	5	7	18	Ret	6	1	56
13	Australia	Will Power	4	2																					51
13	Australia	Christian Jones			15	14							QO						16	Ret					51
13	Australia	Will Davison					Ret	6	11	6	Ret	11	21	10	9	Ret									51
13	Australia	Marcus Marshall															16	3							51
13	Australia	Ryan Briscoe																			10	8	9	3	51
14	Italy	Enrico Toccacelo	16	Ret	17	Ret	11	7	10	Ret	17	4	2	11					3	4			16	9	46
14	Italy	Massimiliano Busnelli													Ret	6	14	Ret							46
14	Italy	Max Papis																			19	7			46
15	Germany	Timo Scheider	14	10	5	10					12	8			7	Ret	12	12	8	5	7	2			38
15	Germany	Adrian Sutil					12	Ret	Ret	Ret			Ret	12											38
15	Germany	Sebastian Stahl																					15	18	38
16	United States	Scott Speed	11	Ret	Ret	Ret	13	4																	23
16	United States	Bryan Herta							15	10	10	7							6	13	9	Ret			23
16	United States	Philip Giebler											13	Ret	13	Ret	15	9					14	10	23
17	South Africa	Stephen Simpson	24	6					Ret	Ret	Ret	12	12	3	Ret	5	Ret	11	Ret	18	11	Ret	11	14	20
17	South Africa	Tomas Scheckter			12	Ret	10	Ret																	20
18	Indonesia	Ananda Mikola	17	Ret	14	8	9	Ret			Ret	14	6	Ret	Ret	Ret	11	14	12	16	Ret	Ret	5	Ret	16
19	Austria	Mathias Lauda	20	11	13	15	16	10	19	Ret	18	Ret	17	7	16	7	13	Ret			12	9	Ret	13	14
19	Austria	Patrick Friesacher																	10	9					14
20	Pakistan	Adam Khan	7	13	Ret	12	Ret	15	12	11	13	Ret	16	Ret	WD						15	11	12	5	10
20	Pakistan	(Italy) Enrico Toccacelo													11	Ret									10
21	Japan	Ryo Fukuda	12	8																					8
21	Japan	Hideki Noda			10	9																			8
21	Japan	Hayanari Shimoda							18	Ret	14	13	14	15			9	Ret	Ret	Ret					8
22	China	Tengyi Jiang	21	12	18	17	Ret	14	16	Ret	20	Ret	19	5	Ret	Ret	Ret	Ret	15	17	17	Ret	QO		6
22	China	Qinghua Ma	QO																QO				14	16	6
23	Lebanon	Khalil Beschir	22	Ret	Ret	18					Ret	17													0
23	Lebanon	Basil Shaaban	QO				18	11	Ret	12			Ret	16	17	Ret	17	Ret							0
23	Lebanon	(United States) Graham Rahal																	13	14	Ret	Ret	18	11	0
24	India	Karun Chandhok	15	DNS	16	Ret																			0
24	India	Armaan Ebrahim					17	13	17	13	11	EXC	20	14	14	Ret	18	15							0
25	Russia	Aleksey Vasilyev	23	Ret																					0
25	Russia	Mikhail Aleshin					15	17																	0
25	Russia	Roman Rusinov							13	Ret															0
Pos	Team	Drivers	S	F	S	F	S	F	S	F	S	F	S	F	S	F	S	F	S	F	S	F	S	F	Pts
Pos	Team	Drivers	(United Kingdom) GBR		(Germany) GER		(Portugal) POR		(Australia) AUS		(Malaysia) MYS		(United Arab Emirates) UAE		(South Africa) RSA		(Indonesia) INA		(Mexico) MEX		(United States) USA		(China) CHN		Pts

Colour	Result
Gold	Winner
Silver	2nd place
Bronze	3rd place
Green	Finished, in points
Green	Retired, in points
Blue	Finished, no points
Purple	Did not finish (Ret)
Purple	Not classified (NC)
Red	Did not qualify (DNQ)
Black	Disqualified (DSQ)
White	Did not start (DNS)
White	Withdrew (WD)
Blank	Did not participate
Blank	Injured (INJ)
Blank	Excluded (EX)
**Bold**	Pole position
*	Fastest lap
spr	Sprint Race
fea	Feature Race
