= A1 Team Japan =

- Japan
- Founded: 2005
- Seat holder(s): -
- Team principal: -
- Race driver(s): Ryo Fukuda; Hideki Noda; Hayanari Shimoda
- First race: 2005-06 Great Britain
- Rounds entered: 7
- Championships: 0
- Sprint race victories: 0
- Feature race victories: 0
- Pole positions: 0
- Fastest laps: 0
- Total points: 8
- 2007-08 position: inactive (0 pts)

The A1 Team Japan was the Japanese team of A1 Grand Prix, an international racing series. It no longer competes as the league was forced into bankruptcy.

== Owners ==
A1 Team Japan current seat holder is unknown, held by a corporate conglomeration. The team was managed by Carlin Motorsport.

== Drivers ==
The main driver for the Japanese team was Ryo Fukuda, with Hideki Noda as a test/second driver. Hayanari Shimoda is the team's third driver.

Name	Seasons	Races (Starts)	A1GP Title	Wins	Sprint wins	Main wins	2nd	3rd	Poles	Fastest Laps	Points
Ryo Fukuda	2005-06	1 (2)									3
Hideki Noda	2005-06	1 (2)									3
Hayanari Shimoda	2005-06	5 (10)									2

== Complete A1 Grand Prix results ==
(key), "spr" indicate a Sprint Race, "fea" indicate a Main Race.

Year	Racing team	Chassis, Engine, Tyres	Drivers	1	2	3	4	5	6	7	8	9	10	11	12	13	14	15	16	17	18	19	20	21	22	Points	Rank
2005-06	Carlin Motorsport	Lola, Zytek, Cooper Avon		GBR spr	GBR fea	GER spr	GER fea	PRT spr	PRT fea	AUS spr	AUS fea	MYS spr	MYS fea	ARE spr	ARE fea	ZAF spr	ZAF fea	IDN spr	IDN fea	MEX spr	MEX fea	USA spr	USA fea	CHN spr	CHN fea	8	21st
2005-06	Carlin Motorsport	Lola, Zytek, Cooper Avon	Ryo Fukuda	12	8																					8	21st
2005-06	Carlin Motorsport	Lola, Zytek, Cooper Avon	Hideki Noda			10	9																			8	21st
2005-06	Carlin Motorsport	Lola, Zytek, Cooper Avon	Hayanari Shimoda							18	Ret	14	13	14	15			9	Ret	Ret	Ret					8	21st
