= A1 Team Russia =

- Russia
- Founded: 2005
- Seat holder(s): Svetlana Strelnikova
- Team principal: -
- Race driver(s): Nikolai Fomenko; Alexey Vasilyev; Mikhail Aleshin; Alexander Tyuryumin
- First race: 2005–06 Great Britain
- Rounds entered: 3
- Championships: 0
- Sprint race victories: 0
- Feature race victories: 0
- Pole positions: 0
- Fastest laps: 0
- Total points: 0
- 2005-06 position: 25th (0 pts)

The A1 Team Russia was the Russian team of A1 Grand Prix, an international racing series.

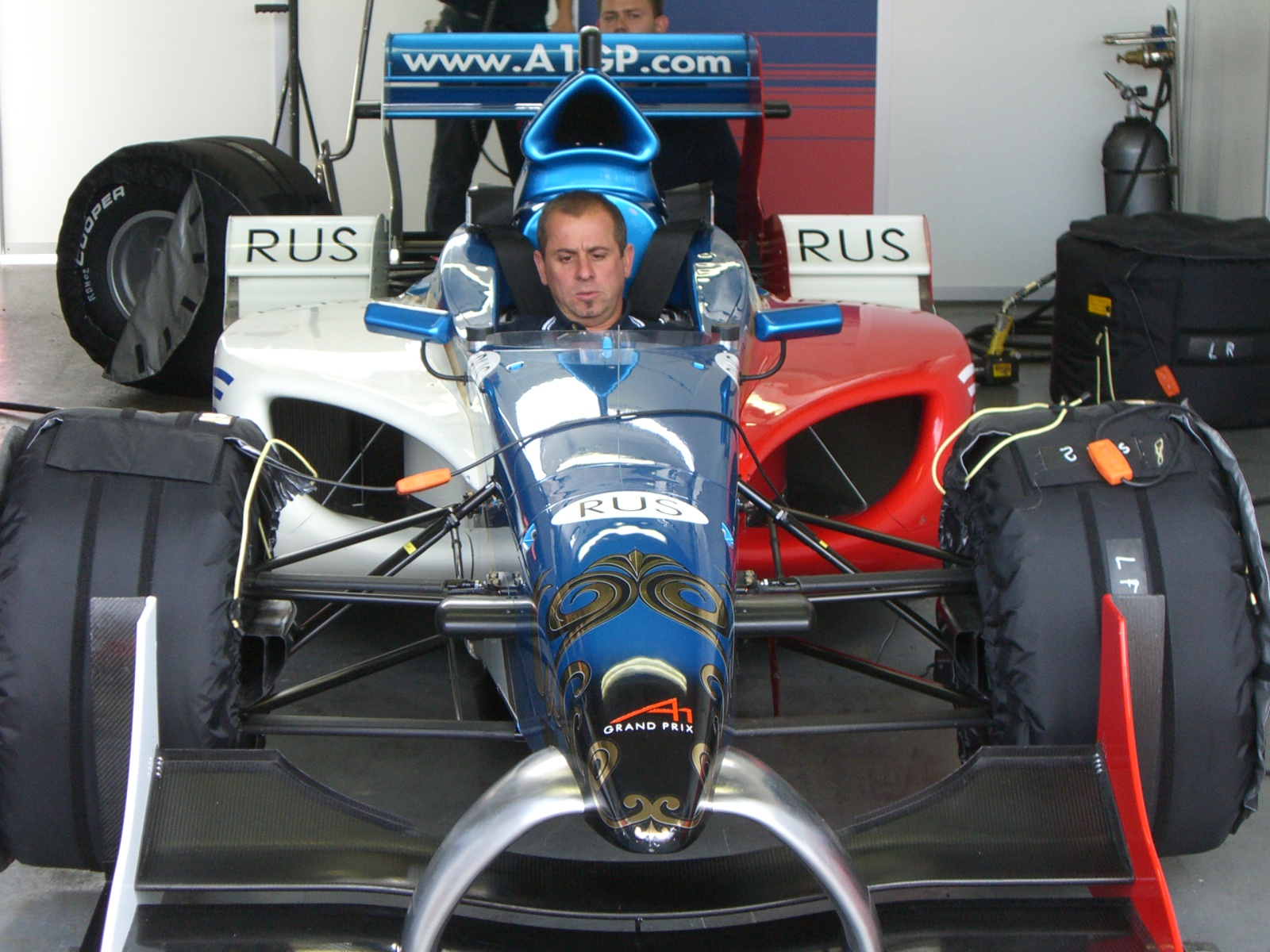
A1 Team Russia testing their engine _{Credit: edvvc}

Name	Seasons	Races (Starts)	A1GP Title	Wins	Sprint wins	Main wins	2nd	3rd	Poles	Fastest Laps	Points
Mikhail Aleshin	2005–06	1 (2)									0
Roman Rusinov	2005–06	1 (2)									0
Alexey Vasilyev	2005–06	1 (2)									0

== Complete A1 Grand Prix results ==
(key), "spr" indicate a sprint race, "fea" indicate a main race.

Year	Racing team	Chassis, Engine, Tyres	Drivers	1	2	3	4	5	6	7	8	9	10	11	12	13	14	15	16	17	18	19	20	21	22	Points	Rank
2005–06	Russian Age Racing	Lola, Zytek, Cooper Avon		GBR spr	GBR fea	GER spr	GER fea	PRT spr	PRT fea	AUS spr	AUS fea	MYS spr	MYS fea	ARE spr	ARE fea	ZAF spr	ZAF fea	IDN spr	IDN fea	MEX spr	MEX fea	USA spr	USA fea	CHN spr	CHN fea	0	25th
2005–06	Russian Age Racing	Lola, Zytek, Cooper Avon	Alexey Vasilyev	23	Ret																					0	25th
2005–06	Russian Age Racing	Lola, Zytek, Cooper Avon	Mikhail Aleshin					15	17																	0	25th
2005–06	Russian Age Racing	Lola, Zytek, Cooper Avon	Roman Rusinov							13	Ret															0	25th
