= 2006 Formula V6 Asia by Renault Series =

Motor racing competition

2006 Formula V6 Asia

Seasons
- ← none 2007 →

The 2006 Formula V6 Asia Series was the first season of the series. The season started on May 13–14 in Sepang and ended on October 21–22 in Zuhai.

== Drivers and teams ==
Team	No	Driver	Rounds
(United States) CT Motorsport	2	(United States) Seth Ingham	All
(United States) CT Motorsport	3	(Taiwan) Ken Lee	1–4
(United States) CT Motorsport	3	(United States) Timothy Barber	5–6
(South Korea) Team E-Rain	5	(India) Karun Chandhok	All
(South Korea) Team E-Rain	85	(Taiwan) Hanss Lin	All
(Hong Kong) Champ Motorsport	7	(Taiwan) Jeffrey Lee	All
(Hong Kong) Champ Motorsport	8	(Macau) Michael Ho	1–4
(Hong Kong) Champ Motorsport	27	(Macau) Michael Ho	5
(Hong Kong) Champ Motorsport	27	(China) Adderly Fong	6
(Philippines) Eurasia Motorsport	9	(Indonesia) Ananda Mikola	All
Racing For Singapore	21	(Singapore) Denis Lian	All
(Malaysia) Team Meritus	38	(Bahrain) Hamad Al Fardan	1–4
(Malaysia) Team Meritus	38	(China) Marchy Lee	5–6
(Malaysia) Team Meritus	42	(New Zealand) Matt Halliday	2–6
Privateers	10	(Indonesia) Moreno Soeprapto	3
Privateers	14	(Japan) Daisuke Ikeda	1
Privateers	15	(Malaysia) B.J. Lee	3–4
Privateers	31	(Singapore) Hafiz Koh	5–6

== Race calendar ==
Round	Location	Circuit	Date	Pole position	Fastest lap	Winning driver	Winning team
1	Sepang, Malaysia	Sepang International Circuit	May 13–14	(India) Karun Chandhok	(India) Karun Chandhok	(India) Karun Chandhok	(South Korea) Team E-Rain
2	Sepang, Malaysia	Sepang International Circuit	May 13–14		(India) Karun Chandhok	(Indonesia) Ananda Mikola	(Philippines) Eurasia Motorsport
3	Sepang, Malaysia	Sepang International Circuit	June 24–25	(Bahrain) Hamad Al Fardan	(Bahrain) Hamad Al Fardan	(Bahrain) Hamad Al Fardan	(Malaysia) Team Meritus
4	Sepang, Malaysia	Sepang International Circuit	June 24–25		(New Zealand) Matt Halliday	(New Zealand) Matt Halliday	(Malaysia) Team Meritus
5	Sentul, Indonesia	Sentul International Circuit	July 30–31	(New Zealand) Matt Halliday	(New Zealand) Matt Halliday	(India) Karun Chandhok	(South Korea) Team E-Rain
6	Sentul, Indonesia	Sentul International Circuit	July 30–31		(New Zealand) Matt Halliday	(Indonesia) Ananda Mikola	(Philippines) Eurasia Motorsport
7	Zhuhai, China	Zhuhai International Circuit	August 14–15	(India) Karun Chandhok	(New Zealand) Matt Halliday	(India) Karun Chandhok	(South Korea) Team E-Rain
8	Zhuhai, China	Zhuhai International Circuit	August 14–15		(New Zealand) Matt Halliday	(India) Karun Chandhok	(South Korea) Team E-Rain
9	Zhuhai, China	Zhuhai International Circuit	October 21–22	(India) Karun Chandhok	(China) Marchy Lee	(India) Karun Chandhok	(South Korea) Team E-Rain
10	Zhuhai, China	Zhuhai International Circuit	October 21–22		(India) Karun Chandhok	(India) Karun Chandhok	(South Korea) Team E-Rain
11	Zhuhai, China	Zhuhai International Circuit	October 21–22	(India) Karun Chandhok	(India) Karun Chandhok	(India) Karun Chandhok	(South Korea) Team E-Rain
12	Zhuhai, China	Zhuhai International Circuit	October 21–22		(China) Marchy Lee	(New Zealand) Matt Halliday	(Malaysia) Team Meritus

== Full Series Results ==
Points are awarded in both races as following: 15, 12, 10, 8, 6, 5, 4, 3, 2 for 9th and 1 bonus points for pole position in the first of the two venue races but only awarded to drivers, not for teams. Only the drivers that achieve races are awarded by points.

=== Drivers ===
Pos	Driver	MAL1 (Malaysia)		MAL2 (Malaysia)		IND (Indonesia)		CHI1 (China)		CHI2 (China)				Points
Pos	Driver	1	2	3	4	5	6	7	8	9	10	11	12	Points
1	(India) Karun Chandhok	1	Ret	3	3	1	Ret	1	1	1	1	1	Ret	131
2	(New Zealand) Matt Halliday			Ret	1	4	2	4	2	2	2	2	1	107
3	(Indonesia) Ananda Mikola	4	1†	Ret	5	2	1	2	4	4	4	3	Ret	98
4	(United States) Seth Ingham	7	3	2	3	5	Ret	5	6	5	5	Ret	4	73
5	(Taiwan) Hanss Lin	2	5	Ret	Ret	Ret	3	3	5	3	3	4	Ret	72
6	(Bahrain) Hamad Al Fardan	3	2	1	4	3	Ret	Ret	3					66
7	(Singapore) Denis Lian	Ret	DNS	4	6	7	4	DNS	DNS	Ret	Ret	8	5	34
8	(Macau) Michael Ho	5	4	5	Ret	DNS	DNS	8	Ret	Ret	Ret			23
9	(China) Marchy Lee									7	Ret	5	2	22
10	(Taiwan) Jeffrey Lee	Ret	6	Ret	Ret	DNS	DNS	7	Ret	Ret	7	9	7	19
11	(Taiwan) Ken Lee	6	DNS	6	Ret	Ret	Ret	6	Ret					15
12	(China) Adderly Fong											6	3	15
13	(United States) Timothy Barber									6	6	7	Ret	14
14	(Indonesia) Moreno Soeprapto					6	5							11
15	(Singapore) Hafiz Koh									8	Ret	Ret	6	8
16	(Malaysia) B.J. Lee					Ret	Ret	DNS	Ret					0
17	(Japan) Daisuke Ikeda	Ret	DNS											0
Pos	Driver	MAL1 (Malaysia)		MAL2 (Malaysia)		IND (Indonesia)		CHI1 (China)		CHI2 (China)				Points
Pos	Driver	1	2	3	4	5	6	7	8	9	10	11	12	Points

Colour	Result
Gold	Winner
Silver	Second place
Bronze	Third place
Green	Points classification
Blue	Non-points classification
Blue	Non-classified finish (NC)
Purple	Retired, not classified (Ret)
Red	Did not qualify (DNQ)
Red	Did not pre-qualify (DNPQ)
Black	Disqualified (DSQ)
White	Did not start (DNS)
White	Withdrew (WD)
White	Race cancelled (C)
Blank	Did not practice (DNP)
Blank	Did not arrive (DNA)
Blank	Excluded (EX)

=== Teams ===
Pos	Team	Drivers	MAL1 (Malaysia)		MAL2 (Malaysia)		IND (Indonesia)		CHI1 (China)		CHI2 (China)				Points
Pos	Team	Drivers	1	2	3	4	5	6	7	8	9	10	11	12	Points
1	(South Korea) Team E-Rain	Karun Chandhok	1*	Ret*	2	3	1	Ret	1	1	1	1*	1*	Ret	199
1	(South Korea) Team E-Rain	Hanss Lin	2	5	Ret	Ret	Ret	3	3	5	3	3	4	Ret	199
2	(Malaysia) Team Meritus	Matt Halliday			Ret	1*	4	2	4*	2*	2	2	2	1	193
2	(Malaysia) Team Meritus	Hamad Al Fardan	3	2	1*	4	3	Ret	Ret	3					193
2	(Malaysia) Team Meritus	Marchy Lee									7*	Ret	5	2*	193
3	(United States) CT Motorsport	Seth Ingham	7	3	2	3	5	Ret	5	6	5	5	Ret	4	102
3	(United States) CT Motorsport	Ken Lee	6	DNS	6	Ret	Ret	Ret	6	Ret					102
3	(United States) CT Motorsport	Timothy Barber									6	6	7	Ret	102
4	(Philippines) Eurasia Motorsport	Ananda Mikola	4	1†	Ret	5	2	1	2	4	4	4	3	Ret	98
5	(Hong Kong) Champ Motorsport	Michael Ho	5	4	5	Ret	DNS	DNS	8	Ret	Ret	Ret			57
5	(Hong Kong) Champ Motorsport	Jeffrey Lee	Ret	6	Ret	Ret	DNS	DNS	7	Ret	Ret	7	9	7	57
5	(Hong Kong) Champ Motorsport	Adderly Fong											6	3	57
6	Racing For Singapore	Denis Lian	Ret	DNS	4	6	7	4	DNS	DNS	Ret	Ret	8	5	34
7	Privateer	Moreno Soeprapto					6	5							19
7	Privateer	Hafiz Koh									8	Ret	Ret	6	19
7	Privateer	BJ Lee					Ret	Ret	DNS	Ret					19
Pos	Team	Drivers	MAL1 (Malaysia)		MAL2 (Malaysia)		IND (Indonesia)		CHI1 (China)		CHI2 (China)				Points
Pos	Team	Drivers	1	2	3	4	5	6	7	8	9	10	11	12	Points

- † = 4 penalty points.

== Sources ==
- formula3.cc, results.
