= 2007 Formula Renault V6 Asia Championship =

Motor racing competition

2007 Formula V6 Asia

Seasons
- ← 2006 2008 →

The 2007 Formula V6 Asia season took place in five Asian countries. The season started on May 5–6 in Sepang and ended on November 3–4 in Zuhai.

British driver James Winslow was crowned the 2007 Formula V6 Asia Champion after last round of the championship.

== Drivers and teams ==
Team	No	Driver	Rounds
(United States) CT Motorsport	2	(Malaysia) Aaron Lim	3
(United States) CT Motorsport	4	(Taiwan) Kevin Chen	3–6
(United States) CT Motorsport	5	(India) Parthiva Sureshwaren	4
(United States) CT Motorsport	15	(Malaysia) B.J. Lee	2
(United States) CT Motorsport	71	(United States) Seth Ingham	1
(United States) CT Motorsport	89	(Indonesia) Robin Tato	6
(Malaysia) Team TARADTM	3	(India) Armaan Ebrahim	All
(Malaysia) Team TARADTM	31	(Singapore) Hafiz Koh	All
(Philippines) Eurasia Motorsport	5	(India) Parthiva Sureshwaren	1–3
(Hong Kong) Super Champ Racing	7	(Taiwan) Jeffrey Lee	All
(Hong Kong) Super Champ Racing	27	(Macau) Michael Ho	5
(Hong Kong) Super Champ Racing	38	(China) Marchy Lee	2, 6
(Malaysia) Team Meritus	18	(Japan) Katsuhiro Konno	5
(Malaysia) Team Meritus	38	(China) Marchy Lee	1
(Malaysia) Team Meritus	58	(Indonesia) Satrio Hermanto	1–4, 6
(Malaysia) Team Meritus	78	(New Zealand) Earl Bamber	2–5
(Malaysia) Team Meritus	78	(Japan) Hiroki Yoshimoto	6
(Malaysia) Team Meritus	88	(United Kingdom) James Winslow	2–6
(South Korea) Team E-Rain	19	(Australia) Karl Reindler	1, 5
(South Korea) Team E-Rain	71	(United States) Seth Ingham	2
(Hong Kong) Champ Motorsport	50	(China) Adderly Fong	All
(Hong Kong) Champ Motorsport	85	(Taiwan) Hanss Lin	1–5

== Race calendar ==
Round	Location	Circuit	Date	Pole position	Fastest lap	Winning driver	Winning team
1	Sepang, Malaysia	Sepang International Circuit	May 5–6	(China) Marchy Lee	(China) Marchy Lee	(China) Marchy Lee	(Hong Kong) Super Champ Racing
2	Sepang, Malaysia	Sepang International Circuit	May 5–6		(United States) Seth Ingham	(United States) Seth Ingham	(United States) CT Motorsport
3	Sepang, Malaysia	Sepang International Circuit	June 23–24	(Malaysia) Earl Bamber	(United Kingdom) James Winslow	(India) Armaan Ebrahim	(Malaysia) Team TARADTM
4	Sepang, Malaysia	Sepang International Circuit	June 23–24		(Taiwan) Hanss Lin	(India) Armaan Ebrahim	(Malaysia) Team TARADTM
5	Sentul, Indonesia	Sentul International Circuit	July 21–22	(Malaysia) Aaron Lim	(Malaysia) Aaron Lim	(Malaysia) Aaron Lim	(United States) CT Motorsport
6	Sentul, Indonesia	Sentul International Circuit	July 21–22		(Malaysia) Aaron Lim	(India) Armaan Ebrahim	(Malaysia) Team TARADTM
7	Chengdu, China	Chengdu Goldenport Circuit	September 15–16	(United Kingdom) James Winslow	(United Kingdom) James Winslow	(United Kingdom) James Winslow	(Malaysia) Team Meritus
8	Chengdu, China	Chengdu Goldenport Circuit	September 15–16		(Taiwan) Hanss Lin	(United Kingdom) James Winslow	(Malaysia) Team Meritus
9	Kamitsue, Japan	Autopolis Circuit	October 13–14	(United Kingdom) James Winslow	(India) Armaan Ebrahim	(United Kingdom) James Winslow	(Malaysia) Team Meritus
10	Kamitsue, Japan	Autopolis Circuit	October 13–14		(India) Armaan Ebrahim	(India) Armaan Ebrahim	(Malaysia) Team TARADTM
11	Zhuhai, China	Zhuhai International Circuit	November 3–4	(Japan) Hiroki Yoshimoto	(United Kingdom) James Winslow	(Japan) Hiroki Yoshimoto	(Malaysia) Team Meritus
12	Zhuhai, China	Zhuhai International Circuit	November 3–4		(Japan) Hiroki Yoshimoto	(India) Armaan Ebrahim	(Malaysia) Team TARADTM

== Full Series Results ==
Points are awarded in both races as following: 15, 12, 10, 8, 6, 5, 4, 3, 2 and 1 bonus points for pole position in the first of the two venue races but only awarded to drivers, not for teams. Only the drivers that achieve races are awarded by points.

=== Drivers ===
Pos	Driver	MAL1 (Malaysia)		MAL2 (Malaysia)		IND (Indonesia)		CHI1 (China)		JAP (Japan)		CHI2 (China)		Points
Pos	Driver	1	2	3	4	5	6	7	8	9	10	11	12	Points
1	(United Kingdom) James Winslow			3	2	5	2	1	1	1	2	2	3	121
2	(India) Armaan Ebrahim	10	7	1	1	2	1	Ret	2	6	1	3	1	114
3	(Indonesia) Satrio Hermanto	3	3	4	Ret	8	4	4	9			4	4	67
4	(Taiwan) Hanss Lin	4	4	Ret	4	3	6	Ret	3	3	DNS			59
5	(Singapore) Hafiz Koh	6	5	Ret	5	7	Ret	2	6	4	DNS	6	6	56
6	(China) Adderly Fong	5	Ret	6	Ret	6	8	Ret	4	DNS	5	5	2	51
7	(United States) Seth Ingham	2	1	5	6									38
8	(India) Parthiva Sureshwaren	7	2	Ret	3	Ret	7	Ret	5					36
9	(Taiwan) Kevin Chen					9	9	3	7	8	4	7	Ret	33
10	(New Zealand) Earl Bamber			Ret	Ret	4	5	Ret	Ret	2	7			31
11	(Taiwan) Jeffrey Lee	9	6	7	7	Ret	Ret	Ret	8	5	DNS	8	8	31
12	(China) Marchy Lee	1	Ret	2	Ret							DNS	Ret	28
13	(Malaysia) Aaron Lim					1	3							26
14	(Japan) Hiroki Yoshimoto											1	5	22
15	(Australia) Karl Reindler	8	Ret							Ret	3			13
16	(Japan) Katsuhiro Konno									7	6			9
17	(Indonesia) Robin Tato											Ret	7	4
18	(Malaysia) B.J. Lee			Ret	Ret									0
Pos	Driver	MAL1 (Malaysia)		MAL2 (Malaysia)		IND (Indonesia)		CHI1 (China)		JAP (Japan)		CHI2 (China)		Points
Pos	Driver	1	2	3	4	5	6	7	8	9	10	11	12	Points

Colour	Result
Gold	Winner
Silver	Second place
Bronze	Third place
Green	Points classification
Blue	Non-points classification
Blue	Non-classified finish (NC)
Purple	Retired, not classified (Ret)
Red	Did not qualify (DNQ)
Red	Did not pre-qualify (DNPQ)
Black	Disqualified (DSQ)
White	Did not start (DNS)
White	Withdrew (WD)
White	Race cancelled (C)
Blank	Did not practice (DNP)
Blank	Did not arrive (DNA)
Blank	Excluded (EX)

=== Teams ===
Pos	Team	Drivers	MAL1 (Malaysia)		MAL2 (Malaysia)		IND (Indonesia)		CHI1 (China)		JAP (Japan)		CHI2 (China)		Points
Pos	Team	Drivers	1	2	3	4	5	6	7	8	9	10	11	12	Points
1	(Malaysia) Team Meritus	James Winslow			3	2	5	2	1	1	1	2	2	3	241
1	(Malaysia) Team Meritus	Satrio Hermanto	3	3	4	Ret	8	4	4	9			4	4	241
1	(Malaysia) Team Meritus	Earl Bamber			Ret	Ret	4	5	Ret	Ret	2	7			241
1	(Malaysia) Team Meritus	Hiroki Yoshimoto											1	5	241
2	(Malaysia) Team TARADTM	Armaan Ebrahim	10	7	1	1	2	1	Ret	2	6	1	3	1	170
2	(Malaysia) Team TARADTM	Hafiz Koh	6	5	Ret	5	7	Ret	2	6	4	DNS	6	6	170
3	(Hong Kong) Champ Motorsport	Hanss Lin	4	4	Ret	4	3	6	Ret	3	3	DNS			110
3	(Hong Kong) Champ Motorsport	Adderly Fong	5	Ret	6	Ret	6	8	Ret	4	DNS	5	5	2	110
4	(United States) CT Motorsport	Seth Ingham	2	1	5	6									101
4	(United States) CT Motorsport	Kevin Chen					9	9	3	7	8	4	7	Ret	101
4	(United States) CT Motorsport	Aaron Lim					1	3							101
4	(United States) CT Motorsport	Robin Tato											Ret	7	101
4	(United States) CT Motorsport	BJ Lee			Ret	Ret									101
5	(Hong Kong) Super Champ Racing	Marchy Lee	1	Ret	2	Ret							?	Ret	59
5	(Hong Kong) Super Champ Racing	Jeffrey Lee	9	6	7	7	Ret	Ret	Ret	8	5	DNS	8	8	59
6	(Philippines) Eurasia Motorsport	Parthiva Sureshwaren	7	2	Ret	3	Ret	7	Ret	5					36
7	(South Korea) Team E-Rain	Karl Reindler	8	Ret							Ret	3			13
8	(Malaysia) Red Meritus	Katsuhiro Konno									7	6			9
Pos	Team	Drivers	MAL1 (Malaysia)		MAL2 (Malaysia)		IND (Indonesia)		CHI1 (China)		JAP (Japan)		CHI2 (China)		Points
Pos	Team	Drivers	1	2	3	4	5	6	7	8	9	10	11	12	Points

== Sources ==
- formula3.cc, results.
