= UCypher =

ESports tournament in India

- Also known as: UCypher with MTV
- Genre: eSports
- Presented by: Varun Sood; Ayesha Adlakha; Suhail Chandhok
- No. of seasons: 1
- No. of episodes: 35

Original release
- Network: MTV India

UCypher, also known as U Cypher with MTV, is India's first televised Multi-Platform, multi-game, eSports tournament. Six veteran teams competed over a prize pool of Rs. 51 lakhs in the first season. The battle revolved around 4 games, namely Counter Strike: Global Offensive and Dota 2 on PC, Tekken 7 on PS4 and Real Cricket 2017 on mobile. It was founded by Ronnie Screwvala (founder of U Sports) and sports business veteran Supratik Sen (co-founder and CEO of U Sports).

== Season 1 ==
Ucypher Season 1 began broadcasting on MTV India on 19 January 2018. The game play was also shown on the digital platforms, such as; YouTube, YouTube Gaming, Twitch, Voot and usports. Season 1 comprised 35 episodes. The tournament brings together six different Indian teams to compete across three different platforms: PC, consoles and mobile. Each episode had two teams face off on all the four games to gain league points. The final four teams played in the knockout rounds to determine the winners. Teams compete in a round-robin format, and matches are being broadcast on MTV India as 35 one-hour episodes. Season 1 was not live recorded.
This Season was presented by Varun Sood and Ayesha Adlakha along with leading sports presenter/commentator Suhail Chandhok.

| Year | Season | Teams | Result | References |
|---|---|---|---|---|
| 2018 | 1 | Yakshas; Marksmen; Sherdils; Akramaks; Yodhas; Crusaders | Runner Up - Yakshas 106 Points; 1st Runner Up - Marksmen 92 Points | |
