= Audi R8 LMS Cup =

Sportscar racing series

- Category: One-make racing by Audi
- Country: Asia
- Inaugural season: 2012
- Folded: 2019
- Constructors: Audi
- Tyre suppliers: Pirelli
- Last Drivers' champion: (Australia) Yasser Shahin
- Last Teams' champion: The Bend Motorsport Park
- Official website: Official website

The Audi R8 LMS Cup was a one-make sports car racing series by Audi based in Asia. Audi R8 LMS Cup cars were based on the Audi R8 LMS (GT3).

== History ==
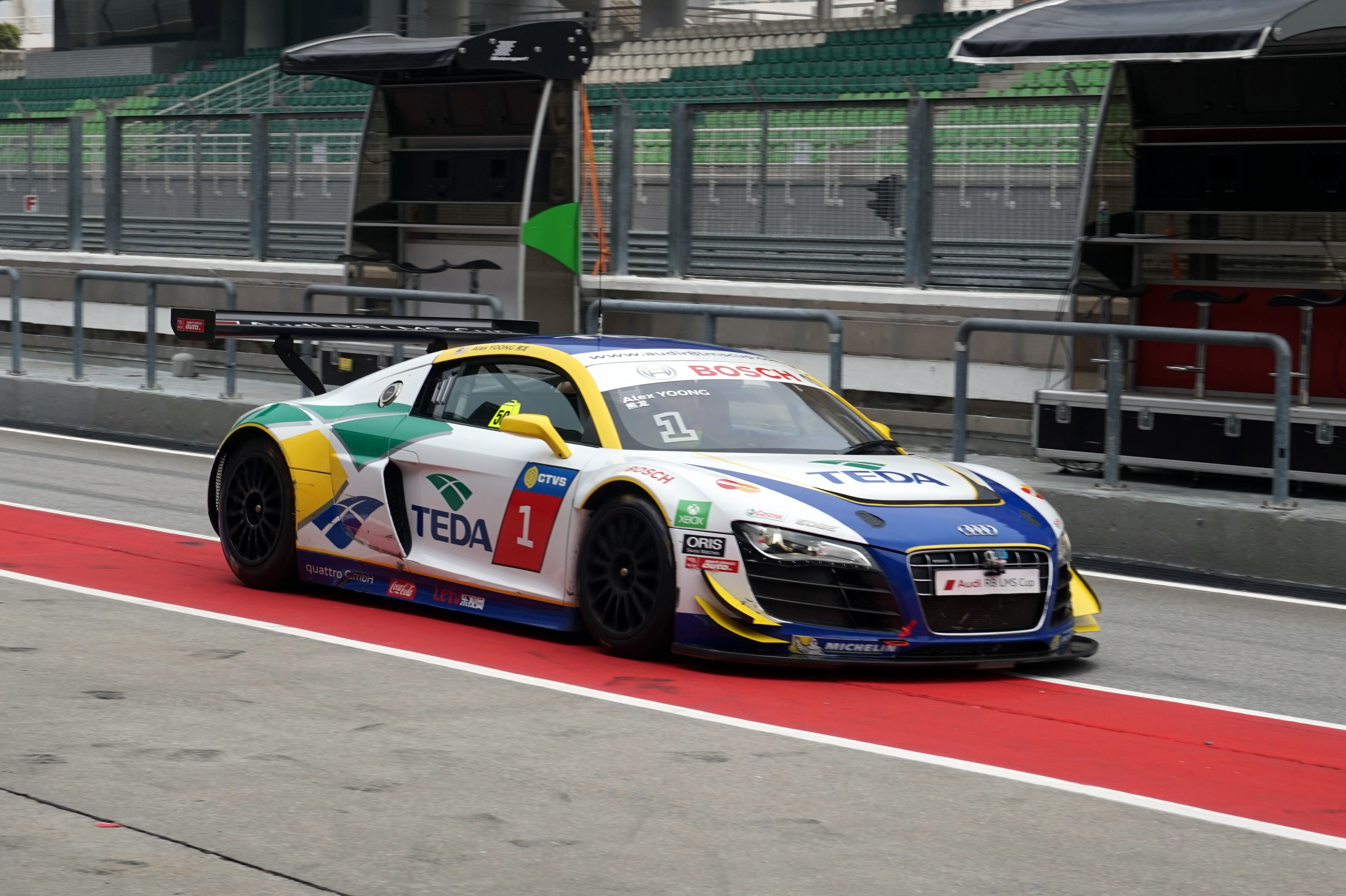
3 Time Driver Champion, Alex Yoong

Audi R8 LMS Cup started in 2012 in all around the Asia. Constructor of this one make racing series was Audi and the tyre supplier was Michelin until the end of 2016.

2016 saw the debut of the new Audi R8 LMS car. Also in 2016, Phoenix Racing and KCMG, join Absolute Racing as Audi R8 LMS Cup service teams.

In 2017, Pirelli became the new official tyre partner for the Audi R8 LMS Cup.

2018 saw the addition of the new Audi R8 LMS GT4 to the series.

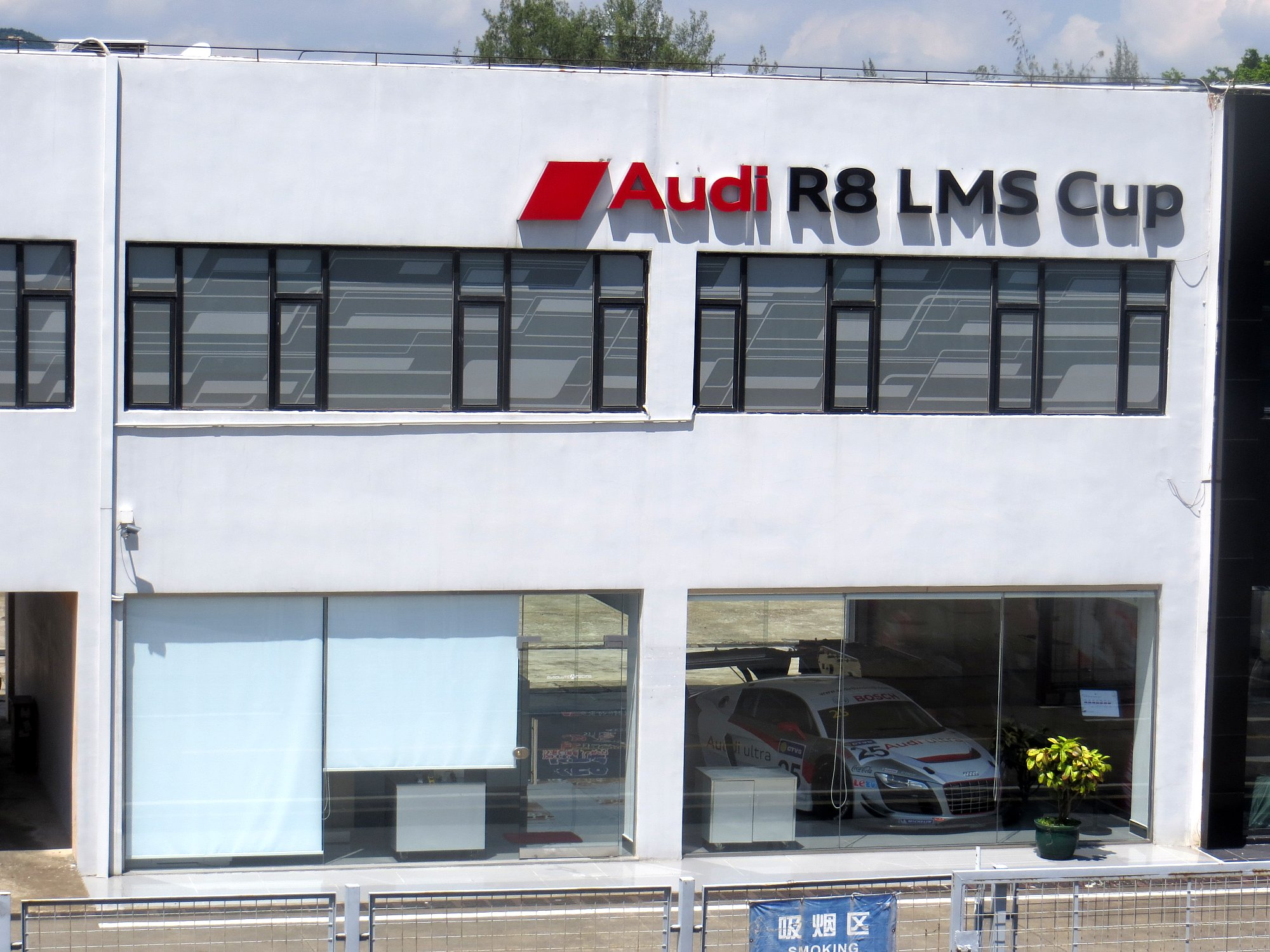
Audi R8 LMS Cup office and shop at Zhuhai International Circuit in 2013.

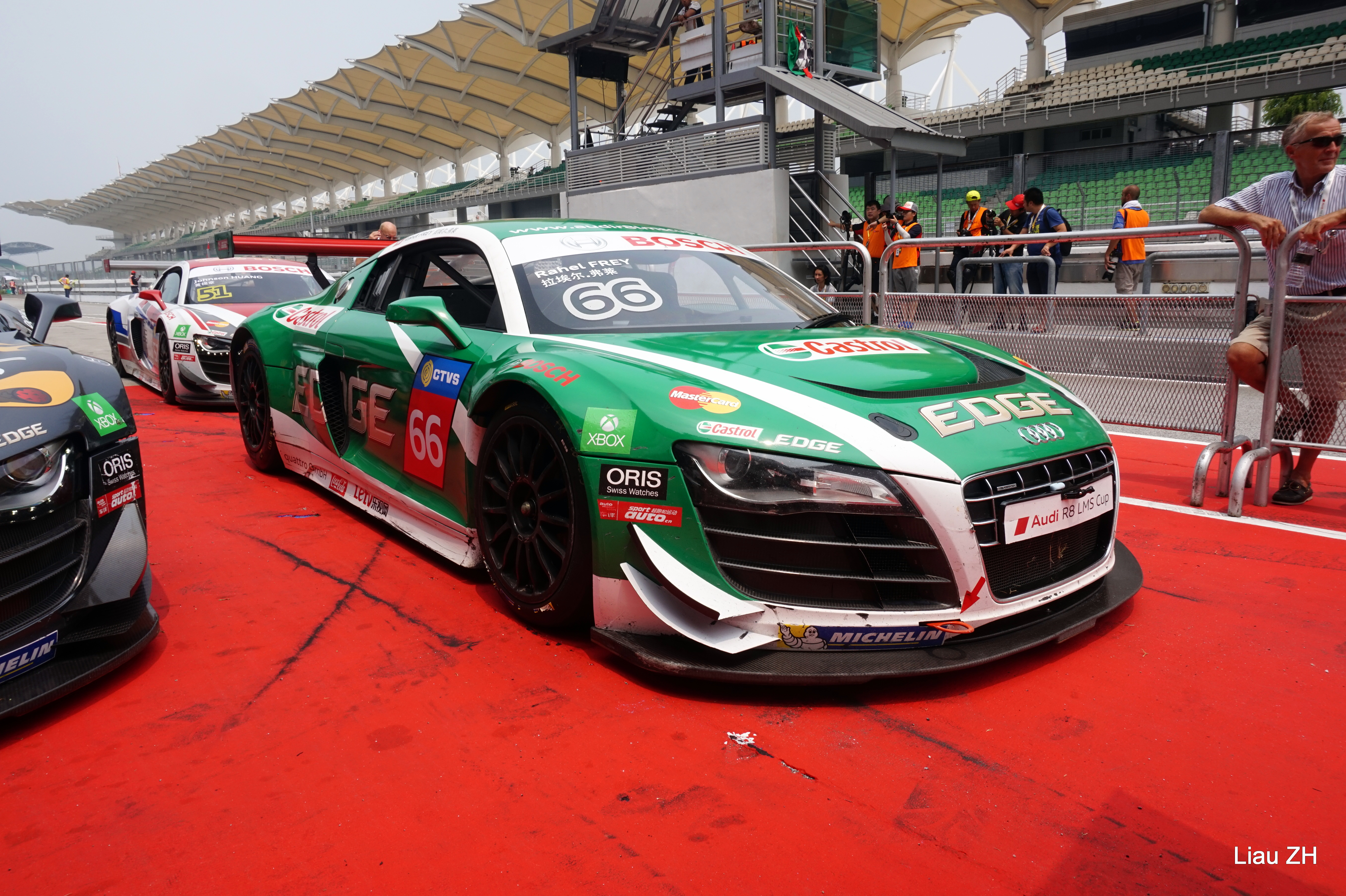
First Generation Audi R8 LMS Cup Car

== Champions Results ==
Season	Champion	Team Champion	Am Cup	
2012	(Hong Kong) Marchy Lee	Audi Ultra Team	(Taiwan) Jeffrey Lee	
2013	(Hong Kong) Adderly Fong	KAMLUNG Racing Team	(Hong Kong) Alex Au	
2014	(Malaysia) Alex Yoong	Audi TEDA Racing Team	(China) Lin Yue	
2015	(Malaysia) Alex Yoong	Audi TEDA Racing Team	(Australia) Daniel Bilski	
2016	(Malaysia) Alex Yoong	Audi TEDA Racing Team	(Taiwan) Jeffrey Lee	
Season	Champion	Team Champion	Am+ Cup	Am Cup
2017	(Belgium) Alessio Picariello	MGT by Absolute	(China) David Chen	(Thailand) Bhurit Bhirombhakdi
2018	(Indonesia) Andrew Haryanto	ProMax Team		(Indonesia) Anderson Tanoto
2019	(Australia) Yasser Shahin	The Bend Motorsport Park		

== Race Cars ==
=== Audi R8 LMS/LMS Ultra (2012–2015) ===
- Vehicle: Sports car complying with FIA GT3 regulations
- Chassis: Audi Space Frame (ASF) made of aluminum with bolted steel roll cage, carbon-fiber composite/aluminum bodywork
- Engine: V10 engine, 90 degree cylinder angle, 4 valves per cylinder, DOHC, petrol direct injection, emission control by two race catalytic converters
- Engine management: Bosch Motronic MED 9.1.2
- Engine lubrication: Dry sump
- Cubic capacity: 5,205 cc
- Power: 560 PS (412 kW; 552 bhp)
- Torque: Over 500 N⋅m (369 lbf⋅ft)
- Steering: Servo-assisted rack and pinion steering
- Suspension: Independent front and rear double- wishbone suspension, damper strut with coil spring (Eibach) and adjustable dampers (Bilstein) as well as adjustable front and rear anti-roll bars
- Brakes: Dual circuit hydraulic brake system, steel brake discs front and rear, race ABS
- Wheels: O.Z. cast magnesium wheels, 11 x 18 inches front, 13 x 18 inches rear
- Tyres: Michelin tyres. Front 27-65 R18. Rear 31-71 R18
- Transmission: Rear wheel drive, traction control (ASR)
- Clutch: Race clutch, upgraded for 2015
- Gearbox: Sequential, pneumatic activated 6-speed sport gearbox with shift- paddles
- Differential: Locking differential
- Driveshafts: Constant velocity joint driveshafts
- Length: 4,470 mm
- Width: 1,984 mm
- Height: 1,195 mm
- Dry weight: 1,290 kg (2,844 lb) (excluding driver)
- Tank capacity: 120 litres
- Fire extinguisher: Audi Sport
- Refueling system: Stäubli
- Seat: Audi Sport customer racing PS-1

=== Audi R8 LMS (2016–2018) ===
- Vehicle type: Sports car complying with FIA GT3 regulations
- Chassis: Audi Space Frame (ASF) in aluminium-CFC hybrid construction with stressed steel roll-cage, bodywork parts from CFC and aluminium
- Safety concept: Energy absorbing aluminium and CFC crash structures front and rear. Safety concept fulfils FIA LMP1 crash requirements. Audi Sport PS1 safety seat
- Engine type: 90 degree V10 engine, 4 valves per cylinder, DOHC, gasoline direct injection, emission control by two exhaust gas race catalytic converters
- Engine management: Bosch Motronic MS 6.4
- Lubrication: dry sump
- Cubic capacity: 5,200 cc
- Power: Variable by restrictor up to 430 kW (585 PS; 577 bhp)
- Torque: over 550 N⋅m (406 lbf⋅ft)
- Transmission: Rear wheel drive, traction control (ASR)
- Clutch: Electro hydraulically activated 3-plate race clutch (ECA)
- Gearbox: Sequential, pneumatically activated 6-speed racing gearbox with paddle shift
- Differential: Limited-slip rear differential, variable preload
- Driveshafts: Driveshafts
- Steering: Servo assisted rack and pinion steering
- Suspension: Front and rear independent suspension. Double wishbones, damper struts with coil springs and adjustable dampers as well as adjustable front and rear anti-roll bars
- Brakes: Hydraulic dual circuit brake system, steel brake discs front and rear, race ABS
- Wheels: Forged aluminium wheels, front 12.5 x 18 inch, rear 13 x 18 inch
- Tyres: front 30-68/18, rear 31-71/18
- Length: 4,583 mm
- Width: 1,997 mm
- Height: 1,171 mm
- Homologation weight: 1,225 kg (2,701 lb)
- Fuel tank capacity: 120 litres
- Controls: Height and length adjustable safety steering column, quick adjust rail mounted pedal box
- Fire extinguisher system: Audi Sport
- Seat system: Audi Sport customer racing PS-1

=== Audi R8 LMS Evo (2019) ===
- Vehicle: Sports car complying with FIA GT3 regulations
- Chassis: Audi Space Frame (ASF) featuring an aluminum CFRP hybrid design with stressed steel roll cage, CFRP and aluminum bolt-on parts
- Safety concept: Energy-absorbing aluminum and CFRP crash structures front and rear. Safety concept meets FIA LMP1 crash requirements. In-roof rescue hatch
- Engine: V10 engine, 90-degree cylinder angle, four valves per cylinder, DOHC, gasoline direct injection, emission control by two exhaust gas catalytic converters for racing
- Engine management: Bosch Motorsport Motronic MS6.4
- Lubrication: Dry sump (adopted from production model)
- Cubic capacity: 5,200 cc
- Power: Variable by means of restrictors up to 430 kW (585 PS; 577 bhp)
- Torque: More than 550 N⋅m (406 lbf⋅ft)
- Type of drive: Rear-wheel drive, traction control (ASR)
- Clutch: Electro-hydraulically operated three-plate racing clutch (ECA)
- Gearbox: Sequential, pneumatically operated six-speed performance transmission with paddle shifters
- Differential: Limited slip differential, variable preload
- Driveshafts: Constant-velocity joint shafts
- Steering: Servo-assisted rack and pinion steering
- Suspension: Front and rear independent suspension, double wishbones, suspension struts with coil springs and adjustable dampers, and adjustable stabilizers front and rear
- Brakes: Hydraulic dual-circuit braking system, steel brake discs front (380 x 34 mm) and rear (355 x 32 mm), racing ABS
- Wheels: Aluminum forged wheels, front 12.5 x 18 inches, rear 13 x 18 inches
- Tyres: Front 30-68/18, rear 31-71/18
- Length: 4,573 mm
- Width: 1,997 mm
- Height: 1,171 mm
- Homologation weight: 1,225 kg (2,701 lb)
- Fuel tank capacity: 120 litres
- Controls: Height- and length-adjustable safety steering column, quick-adjustable rail-supported foot lever unit
- Fire extinguisher system: Lifeline Zero 362O
- Seat system: Audi Protection Seat PS 3

=== Audi R8 LMS GT4 (2018–2019) ===
- Vehicle: Sports car complying with SRO GT4 regulations
- Chassis Audi Space Frame (ASF) in aluminium-CFRP-composite design with weld-in and bolted steel safety cell
- Bodywork: Fiber composite materials and aluminium
- Safety concept : Energy absorbing crash structures, Fire extinguishing system acc. to FIA Standard 8865-2015, Audi Sport customer racing seat protection seat PS3, FT3 safety fuel cell, Rescue hatch
- Engine: 90 degree V10 engine with combined multi-point and gasoline direct injection, 4 valves per cylinder, four double overhead camshafts, emission control by upstream oxygen sensor, metal catalytic converters
- Engine management: 2 x Bosch MED 17 (master-slave-concept)
- Engine lubrication: Dry sump
- Cubic capacity: 5,200 cc
- Power: Variable by restrictor up to 364 kW (495 PS; 488 bhp)
- Torque: over 550 N⋅m (406 lbf⋅ft), depending on BOP balance of performance
- Fuel tank capacity: 110 L (minimum), incl. fuel empty indication (~ 7l)
- Refuelling system: Refilling system eligible for endurance racing (capless)
- Type of drive: Rear wheel drive, traction control ABS, ESC and ASR
- Clutch: Two electrohydraulically operated wet-type multi-plate clutches
- Gearbox: 7-speed double-clutch Stronic transmission with paddle shifters
- Differential: Mechanical limited-slip differential
- Driveshafts: Constant-velocity joint shafts
- Steering: Electrohydraulic rack and pinion steering
- Controls: Height and length adjustable safety steering column
- Steering wheel: multi-function, incl. stickers also for console
- Suspension: Double wishbones front and rear, 2-way gas pressure dampers, ride height, toe, camber and stabilizers adjustable
- Brakes: Hydraulic dual circuit brake system, steel brake discs front and rear, ABS
- Wheels: 5-hole cast aluminium wheels, front 11 x 18 inch ET63, rear 12 x 18 inch ET56
- Tyres: front 305/645 R18; rear: 325/668 R18
- Length: 4,467 mm
- Width: 1,990 or 2,037 mm (without/with side mirrors)
- Height: 1,240 mm
- Wheelbase: 2,650 mm
- Homologation weight: 1,460 kg (3,219 lb)

== Schedule ==
=== 2012 ===
Round	Date	Location	Country
1–2	April 28–29	Shanghai International Circuit	(China)
3–4	June 2–3	Zhuhai International Circuit	(China)
5–6	August 18–19	Ordos International Circuit	(China)
7–8	September 15–16	Zhuhai International Circuit	(China)
9–10	October 27–28	Shanghai International Circuit	(China)
11–12	November 10–11	Shanghai International Circuit	(China)

=== 2013 ===
Round	Date	Location	Country
1–2	May 3–5	Zhuhai International Circuit	(China)
3–4	July 5–7	Ordos International Circuit	(China)
5–6	August 2–4	Inje Speedium	(South Korea)
7–8	August 29–31	Sepang International Circuit	(Malaysia)
9–10	October 25–27	Shanghai International Circuit	(China)
11	November 9–10	Guia Circuit	(Macau)

=== 2014 ===
Round	Date	Location	Country
1–2	May 17–18	Korea International Circuit	(South Korea)
3–4	July 26–27	Fuji Speedway	(Japan)
5–6	August 16–17	Sepang International Circuit	(Malaysia)
7–8	October 18–19	Shanghai International Circuit	(China)
9–10	October 31–November 2	Shanghai International Circuit	(China)
11–12	December 13–14	Yas Marina Circuit	(United Arab Emirates)

=== 2015 ===
Round	Date	Location	Country
1–2	March 21–22	Zhuhai International Circuit	(China)
3–4	May 16–17	Korea International Circuit	(South Korea)
5–7	July 4–5	Penbay International Circuit	(Taiwan)
8–9	September 5–6	Sepang International Circuit	(Malaysia)
10–11	October 10	Fuji Speedway	(Japan)
12–13	October 31–November 1	Shanghai International Circuit	(China)

=== 2016 ===
Round	Date	Location	Country
1–2	May 21–22	Shanghai International Circuit	(China)
3–4	July 23–24	Chang International Circuit	(Thailand)
5–6	August 13–14	Sepang International Circuit	(Malaysia)
7–8	September 24–25	Korea International Circuit	(South Korea)
9–10	October 15–16	Penbay International Circuit	(Taiwan)
11–12	November 4–5	Shanghai International Circuit	(China)

=== 2017 ===
Round	Date	Location	Country
1–2	May 6–7	Sepang International Circuit	(Malaysia)
3–4	June 10–11	Suzuka Circuit	(Japan)
5–6	July 15–16	Korea International Circuit	(South Korea)
7–8	September 9–10	Shanghai International Circuit	(China)
9–10	October 15–16	Zhejiang International Circuit	(China)

=== 2018 ===
Round	Date	Location	Country
1–2	March 3–4	Adelaide Street Circuit	(Australia)
3–4	May 11–12	Nürburgring	(Germany)
5–6	September 1–2	Ningbo International Circuit	(China)
7–8	October 5–6	Shanghai International Circuit	(China)
invitational race	October 7	Shanghai International Circuit	(China)
9–10	November 24–25	Sepang International Circuit	(Malaysia)

=== 2019 ===
Round	Date	Location	Country
1–2	March 2–3	Adelaide Street Circuit	(Australia)
3–4	May 4–5	Zhuhai International Circuit	(China)
5–6	June 1–2	Shanghai International Circuit	(China)
7–8	August 23–24	Suzuka Circuit	(Japan)
9–10	November 23–24	Sepang International Circuit	(Malaysia)

== See also ==
- Ferrari Challenge
- Lamborghini Super Trofeo
- Porsche Carrera Cup
- Porsche Supercup
