= Suhail Chandhok =

Indian television presenter

- Born: Suhail Chandhok; 8 December 1987 (age 38); Madras, India
- Occupation: JioCinema Presenter
- Years active: 3
- Known for: Cricket commentary
- Spouse: Trishya Screwvala
- Relatives: Karun Chandhok (brother); Ronnie Screwvala (father-in-law); Zarina Screwvala (mother-in-law)

Suhail Chandhok is an Indian television presenter and commentator with Star Sports, having presented for various sports such as cricket, hockey, kabaddi and football amongst others. He also made a brief stint as an actor with the Tamil film Veeram alongside Ajith Kumar. Suhail is the son of Vicky Chandhok, multiple Indian rallying champion and President of the Federation of Motor Sports Club of India. He is the younger brother of Karun Chandhok, one of the two Formula 1 racing drivers from India.

== Career ==
Suhail completed his schooling from Sishya School in Chennai. He then moved on to Australia and attained a Double Major Degree in Management and Marketing (Commerce) at the University of Adelaide. He went on to become the University's first Indian Cricket recipient of the Oxford-Cambridge Half Blue Award.

Hailing from a family of sports-enthusiasts, Suhail became a cricketer in the Royal Challengers Bangalore team for the Indian Premier League for two years. His career however, was short-lived, owing to acute knee-injuries & multiple surgeries. His passion towards acting led him to make short films under the alias of "Johnny Vetrivel" which garnered quite some attention on YouTube, including that of South Indian actor, Ajith Kumar.

He had a role in the Tamil film Veeram, playing one of Ajith Kumar's younger brothers. He then went on to become a Sports Presenter and Commentator with Star Sports. He is now associated with sports like Cricket, Football, Hockey and Pro Kabaddi among others. He has hosted and presented the ICC World Cup 2015, ICC T20 WC 2016, ICC Champions Trophy 2017 for Star Sports and the IPL on Hotstar as far as cricket is concerned. He has also been a presenter and commentator on properties such as the Hero Indian Super League Football and the Celebrity Classico Football. He has been the English commentator for the Hero Hockey India League and for the Pro Kabaddi League.

He has also worked at an international level for events such as the Rio Olympics 2016, the global FIA Formula E Series and the French Open.

Apart from being a commentator, Suhail is a public speaker on several platforms for corporates, industries, events and organisations that includes MRF, CII, Nubia Mobiles, PUMA, Arsenal Football Club, Standard Chartered, Golf India and Business Awards, TATA Motors, GQ India, Govt. of Australia and Premier Futsal. He has also been writing for several publications on various topics on sports.

He conceived and executed India's first Periscope TV Chat Show, "OnTheBall with Suhail" featuring stalwarts from across the film and sports industry. He has also been an Ambassador for brands like Castrol Activ, StudyAdelaide, SportsNut App and Omologato Watches.

In 2018, he covered the Indian Premier League auctions on Star Sports and was also guest host on the MTV's UCypher, India's first gaming reality show.

== Personal life ==
Suhail is the son of Vicky Chandhok (former racing and rally driver and the president of the FIA Asia-Pacific Rally Championship) and Chitra Chandhok. He is the younger brother of former F1 driver and commentator Karun Chandhok. Suhail married Trishya Screwvala, daughter of Ronnie Screwvala on 19 January 2017. The private wedding was held at the TAJ Mahal Palace in Mumbai followed by a reception at the Bombay Turf Club. It was attended by a number of celebrities and industrialists.

== Filmography ==
- Veeram (2014)

== Awards ==
Suhail is the first Indian to have been lauded with the Oxford Cambridge Half-Blue award from the University of Adelaide of Cricketing Excellence. He has also been awarded the Australian Alumni Excellence Award 2015 for Sports, Art & Culture.
