= Vicky Chandhok =

Indian racing driver

President of Federation of Motor Sports Clubs of India
- In office 2003–2005
- Preceded by: K Madan
- Succeeded by: Rajat Majumder
- In office 2010–2013
- Preceded by: K D Madan
- Succeeded by: Prithviraj

Vicky Bharat Chandhok (born 7 April 1957) is an Indian racing driver and motorsport administrator. He served as the president of the Federation of Motor Sports Clubs of India (FMSCI) from 2003 to 2005, and from 2010 to 2013,

== Early life ==
Vicky Chandhok was born to Bharat Indu Chandhok, the second son of Lala Indersain Chandhok, who used to participate in Sholavaram races. His late father was also one of the founders of FMSCI and Madras Motor Sports Club (MMSC). His late grandfather, Lala Indersain Chandhok, was an avid enthusiast who sowed the seeds of motorsports in the family. In 1982, Chandhok married Chitra, and together they had two sons, Suhail Chandhok and Karun Chandhok, India's second F1 driver.

== Career ==
Chandhok made his debut as a driver in a modified Ambassador at Sholavaram in 1972. He raced in the 1970s and 1980s and also participated in the Indian National Rally Championship for many years. He quit racing and rallying in 2000 after 28 years, having won over 350 awards. After a five-year hiatus, he competed in the South India Rally again in 2000, which he won in a Mitsubishi Lancer that had just made its debut in Indian rallying. Sandeep Lal was his co-driver, and Manoj Dalal, his long-time navigator, was the event's Clerk of the Course. He made a brief comeback in 2018, competing in the South India Rally 2018 at the age of 61. He and co-driver Chandramouli finished third in the INRC1 category.

== Motorsports administrator ==
Vicky Chandhok helped bring the Indian Grand Prix Formula 1 race to India during his second term as president of the Indian federation. As a representative of the FIA and Bernie Ecclestone, he also oversaw the construction of the F1 track at Buddh International Circuit. He served as a consultant for Jaypee Sports International, the company that built and owned the Formula One track in India. He also served on the FIA Truck Racing Commission and is a member of the FMSCI Council. Additionally, he has won multiple Indian rallying titles.

== Motorsports coach ==
Chandhok established the Wallace Sports and Research Foundation in 1989 to train rally and race drivers. It was registered as a partnership firm in 1991. Akbar Ebrahim, who became the president of FMSCI, was one of the first students at the Wallace Foundation. Under Wallace's direction, Ebrahim competed in his first race at the then brand-new Madras Motor Sports Track which is now renamed as Madras International Circuit. WSRF has trained many motorsports athletes and conducted events over the years.
