= Karun Chandhok =

Indian racing driver (born 1984)

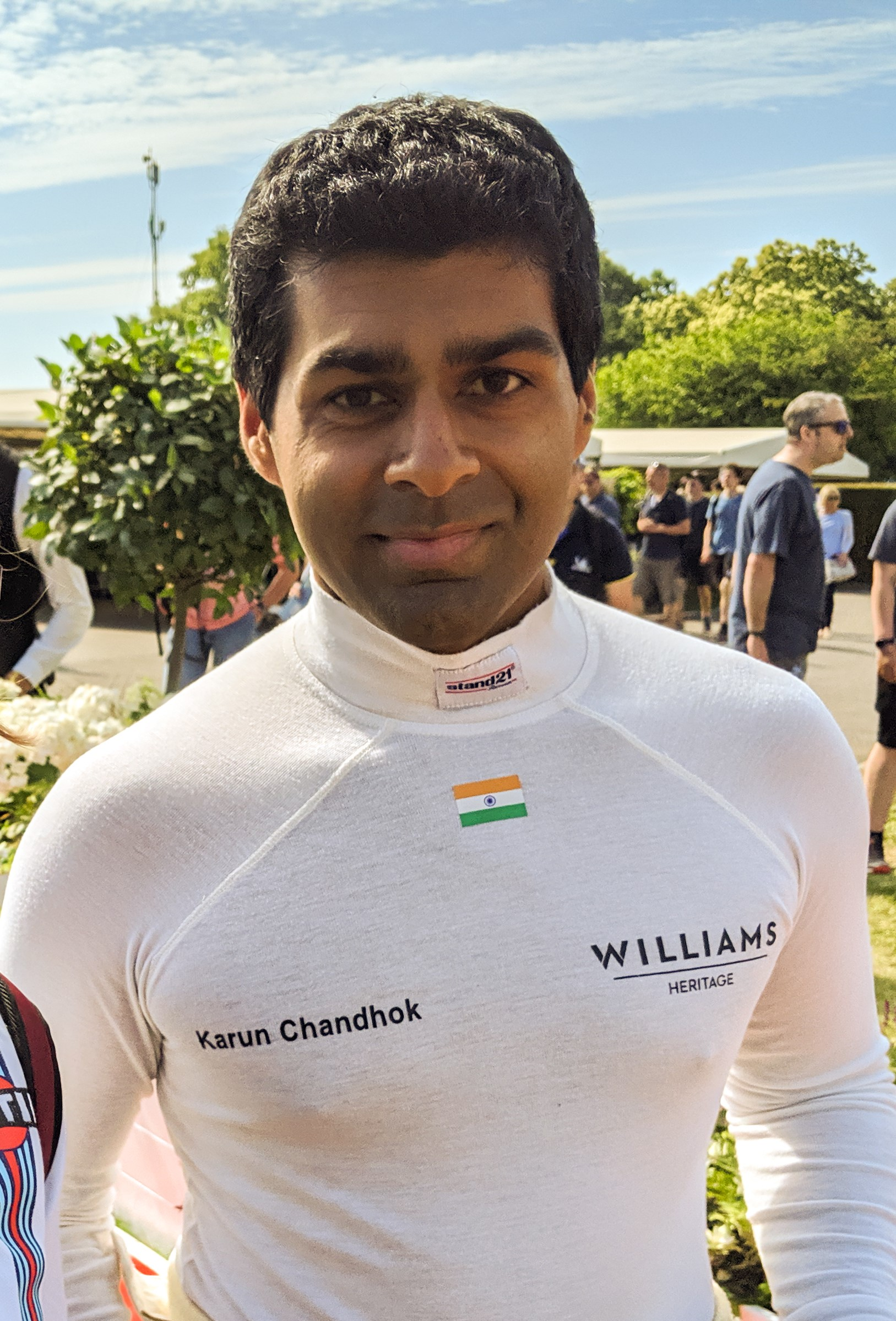
- Chandhok in 2019
- Born: 19 January 1984 (age 42); Madras, Tamil Nadu, India
- Spouse: Akshara Kothari (m. 2014)
- Children: 2

Formula One World Championship career
- Nationality: (India) Indian
- Active years: 2010–2011
- Team(s): HRT, Team Lotus
- Entries: 11 (11 starts)
- Championships: 0
- Wins: 0
- Podiums: 0
- Career points: 0
- Pole positions: 0
- Fastest laps: 0
- First entry: 2010 Bahrain Grand Prix
- Last entry: 2011 German Grand Prix

Formula E career
- Categorisation: FIA Platinum (until 2014); FIA Gold (2015–)
- Years active: 2014–15
- Teams: Mahindra
- Car number: 5
- Starts: 11
- Championships: 0
- Wins: 0
- Poles: 0
- Fastest laps: 0
- Best finish: 17th in 2014–15

24 Hours of Le Mans career
- Years: 2012–2015, 2017
- Teams: JRM, Murphy, Ligier
- Best finish: 6th (2012)
- Class wins: 0

Karun Chandhok (born 19 January 1984) is an Indian former racing driver and broadcaster who competed in Formula One at 11 Grands Prix from 2010 to 2011.

Chandhok also competed in Formula E for Mahindra Racing. Previously, Chandhok has competed for Hispania Racing in Formula One in 2010. Before this, he drove in the GP2 Series for three years, winning two races. In 2013, Chandhok competed in the FIA GT Series for Seyffarth Motorsport.

Prior to his time in GP2, Chandhok won the Formula Asia championship in 2001 and was the inaugural Formula Asia V6 by Renault champion in 2006. Since leaving F1, Chandhok has served as an analyst, co-commentator and pit-lane reporter for a variety of British broadcasters. Since 2019, he has been a member of the Sky Sports F1 live coverage team.

Chandhok has contributed to several motorsport governing bodies. Since 2021, he has served on the Board of Directors of Motorsport UK, where he has also been a member of the Equality, Diversity and Inclusion Committee. He is also a member of the FIA Driver's Commission.

== Early career ==
Chandhok was born in Madras (present-day Chennai), Tamil Nadu, to Vicky Chandhok, a multiple-time Indian rallying champion and president of the Federation of Motor Sports Clubs of India since 2003. His father is of Punjabi descent, and his mother is Tamil Brahmin. His younger brother, Suhail Chandhok, is a sports commentator with Star Sports India.

In 2000, Chandhok was Indian National Racing Champion winning seven out of ten races in the Formula Maruti series. He scored pole position and fastest lap in all ten races. In 2001, Chandhok was the Formula 2000 Asia champion, becoming the youngest ever Asian Formula Champion, driving for Team India Racing.

Chandhok tested with British Formula 3 champion team Carlin Motorsport in 2001. He raced in the National class in 2002, driving for T-Sport, finishing sixth in class. He stayed with T-Sport in the National Class for 2003, and finished third in the final class standings, behind champion Ernesto Viso and runner-up Steven Kane. In 2004, Chandhok stepped up to the main British Formula 3 class with T-Sport, and finished 14th in the standings.

Chandhok struggled with inconsistency when he partnered his compatriot Narain Karthikeyan at RC Motorsport in the World Series by Nissan for the final two rounds the 2004 season. In the four races Chandhok competed in, he scored a DNF, 13th, eighth, before finding success with a fourth place in the final race.

With Karthikeyan moving on to Formula One in 2005, Chandhok raced part-season in the revised Formula Renault 3.5 Series with RC Motorsport. He was the first driver to represent A1 Team India in A1 Grand Prix at the beginning of the 2005–06 season, before handing over to Armaan Ebrahim for the remainder of the season.

In 2006, Chandhok became champion of the first ever Formula Asia V6 by Renault Championship, taking seven race wins and nine pole positions from 12 races.

=== GP2 Series ===
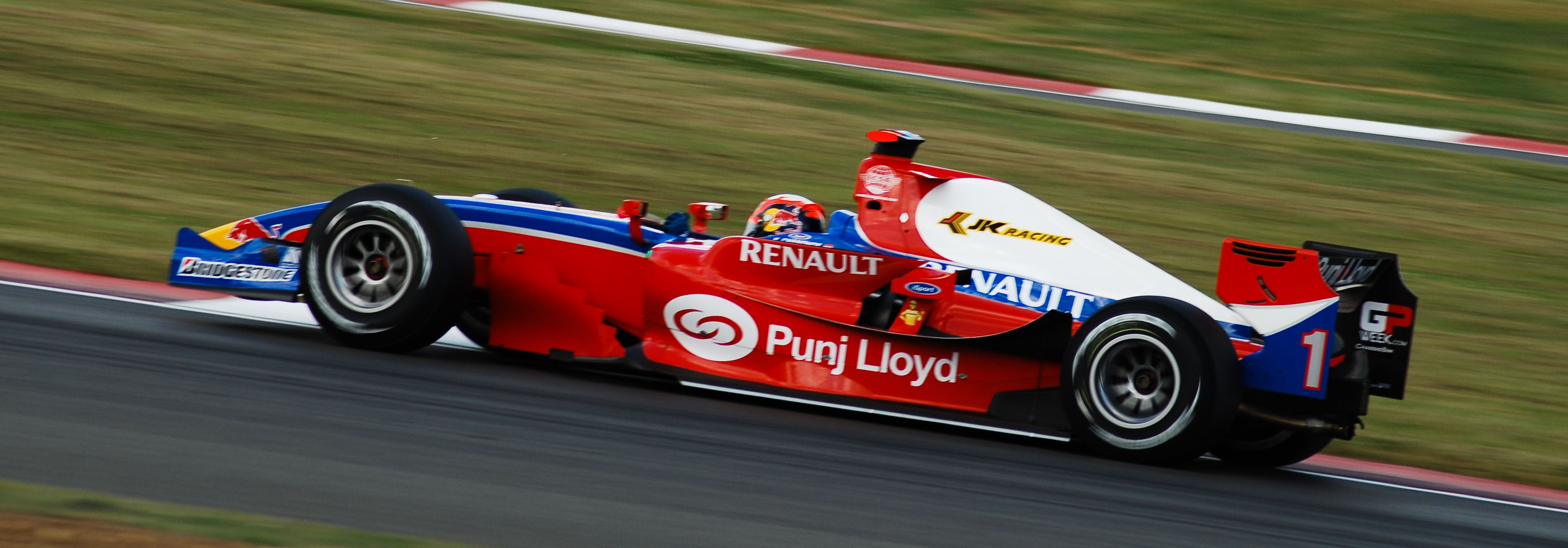
Chandhok driving for iSport International at the Silverstone round of the 2008 GP2 Series season

Chandhok moved to the GP2 Series in 2007, driving for Durango. Chandhok's first win in GP2 came in the sprint race at the Spa-Francorchamps circuit in Belgium. Chandhok also led the sprint race in Turkey after starting from pole, only for the second place Kazuki Nakajima of DAMS to collide with him. The collision resulted in retirement for Chandhok while Nakajima was given a drive-through penalty.

Chandhok got his biggest career break in November with a call up from the Red Bull Racing Formula One team to test for them over two days at the Circuit de Catalunya in Barcelona on 13–14 November.

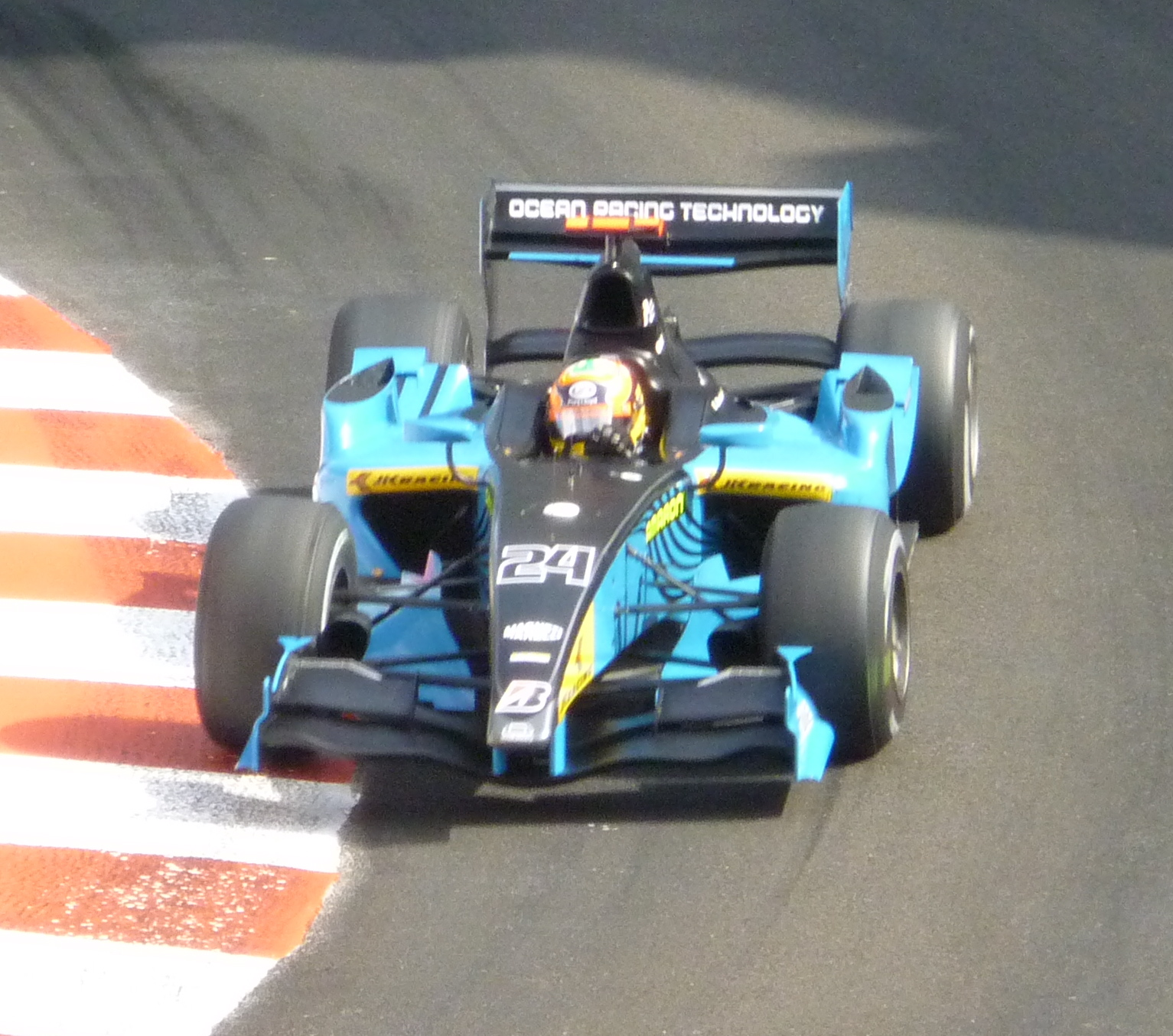
Chandhok driving for Ocean Racing Technology at the Monaco round of the 2009 GP2 Series season

Chandhok remained in GP2 for 2008, switching to the iSport International team where he was partnered by Bruno Senna. He won one race and finished tenth in the drivers' championship. He also drove for the team in the 2008 GP2 Asia Series season. Chandhok was presented with the series' "Best Driving Style" award at the end of the season.

In November, Chandhok became the first Indian driver to be invited to join the British Racing Drivers' Club. India's membership of the Commonwealth entitles him to be a member.

Chandhok signed to drive for the Ocean Racing Technology team in the 2009 GP2 Series season. Even though the deal with ORT was for the pan-European series, Chandhok also drove in the final round of the 2008–09 GP2 Asia Series season, in Bahrain replacing Yelmer Buurman. Chandhok amassed ten points in the championship, with a best result of third at Silverstone. He and teammate Álvaro Parente suffered a testing season, with sixteen retirements between them.

== Formula One ==
=== Force India links ===
Chandhok was linked with the Force India team, which was created in 2008. It was an Indian registered-team formerly owned by a friend of the family, Vijay Mallya. After the team's driver, Giancarlo Fisichella, moved from Force India to Ferrari during the 2009 season, Chandhok was briefly linked with the seat, with long-time supporter Bernie Ecclestone supporting him. The team's test driver, Vitantonio Liuzzi, was instead promoted to the race seat.

Chandhok said in Autosport, on 11 June 2010, that he was targeting a move to Force India for 2011. Chandhok believed that the commercial benefits for the team running an Indian driver made him an obvious choice.

=== HRT (2010) ===
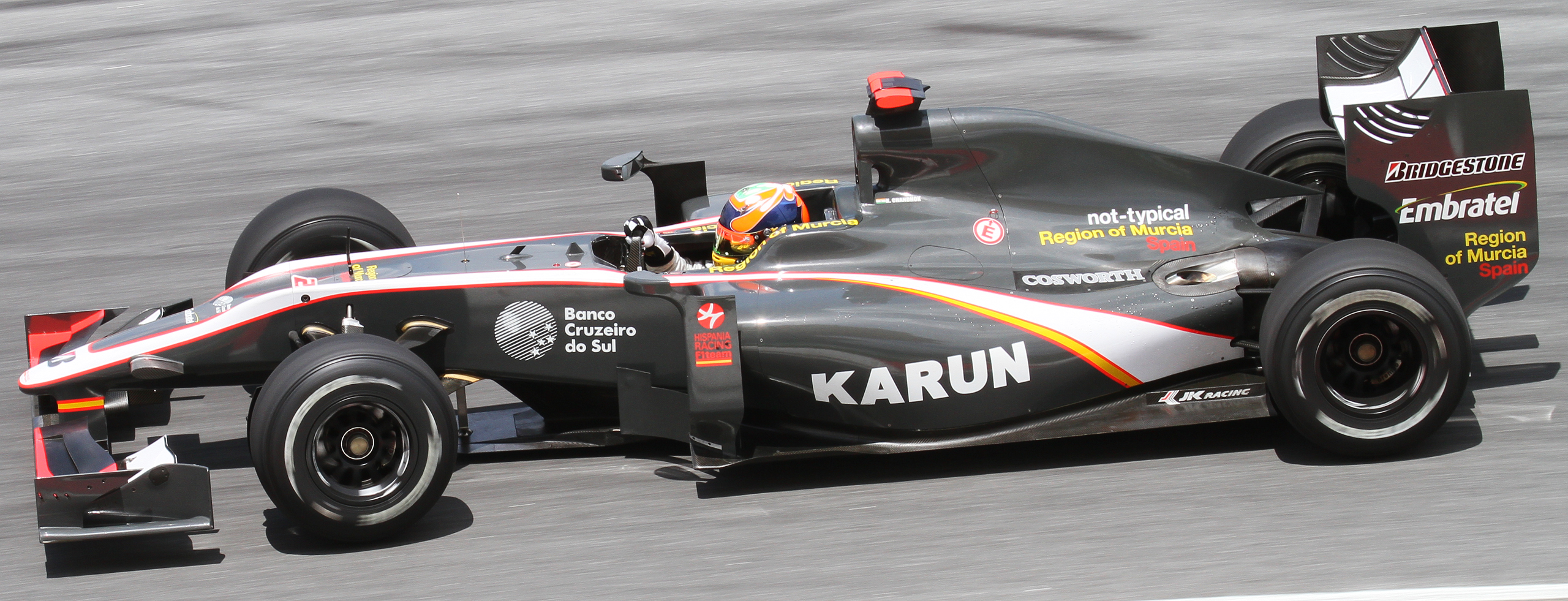
Chandhok recorded Hispania Racing's first finish with fourteenth position in Australia and beat teammate Bruno Senna at the next race in Malaysia.

Chandhok began the 2010 season driving for Hispania Racing alongside former GP2 teammate Bruno Senna, becoming the second Indian driver to compete in Formula One after Narain Karthikeyan in 2005.

At Chandhok's first race, the 2010 Bahrain Grand Prix, he was unable to complete a lap in any of the free practice sessions as his car was still being completed and then suffered hydraulic problems. He was, however, able to use the qualifying session to run his F110 for the first time. He qualified last on the grid, 1.7 seconds behind Senna, who had completed laps earlier in the meeting, and crashed out of the race after just one lap due to a large bump in the tarmac which sent him crashing into the wall. Chandhok recorded the team's first classified finish when he ended up fourteenth in Australia. In Malaysia, he finished 15th, and finished 17th in China. Chandhok retired in the next three races with suspension failure in Spain, an accident with Jarno Trulli in Monaco and more technical problems in Turkey. He finished 18th in Canada and Valencia, and 19th at Silverstone, but was dropped for the German Grand Prix onwards, in favour of Sakon Yamamoto. For all the following races, he was a co-commentator on BBC Radio 5 Live's coverage of the sport.

=== Lotus (2011) ===
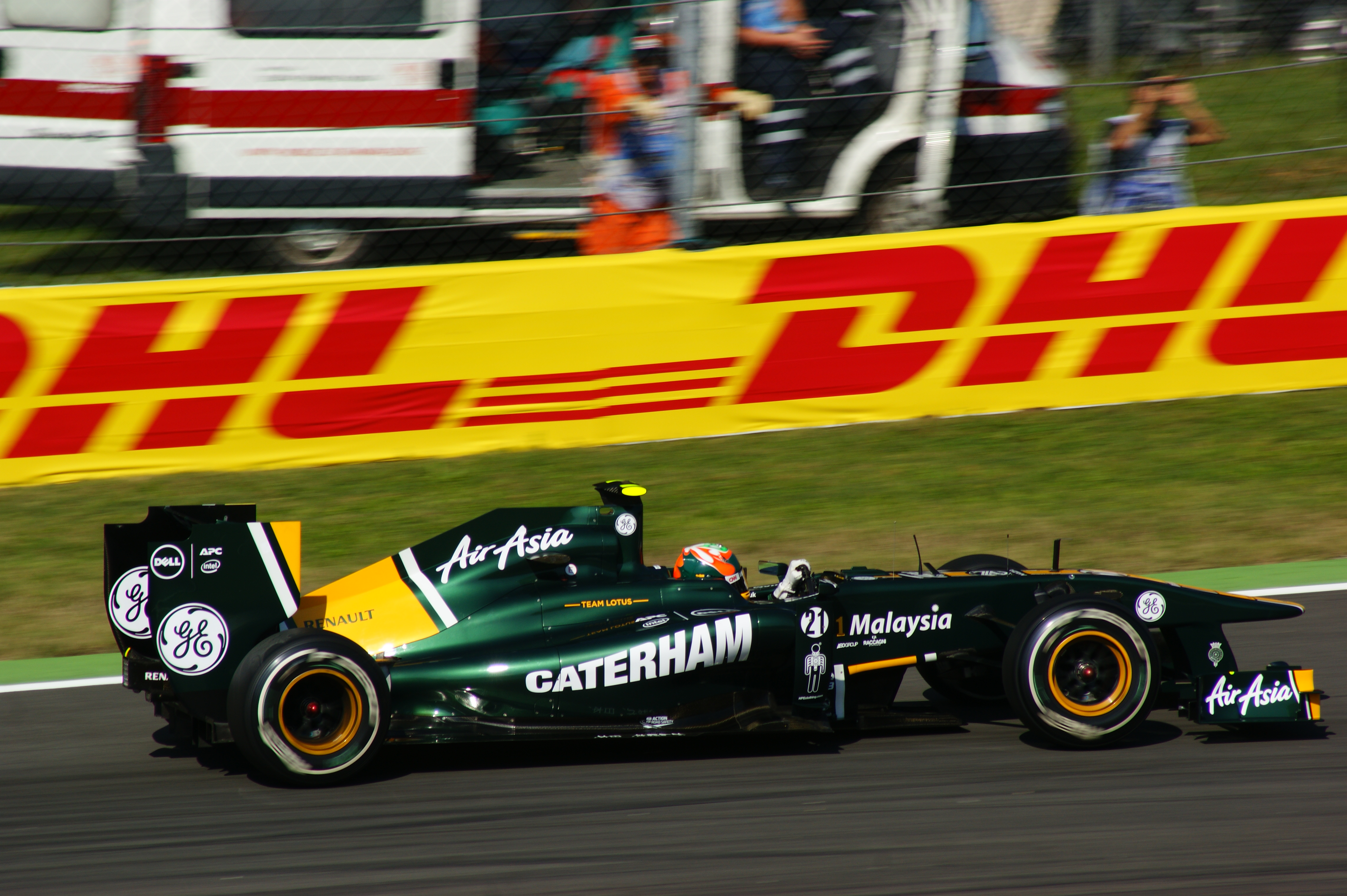
Chandhok as Team Lotus's third driver at the 2011 Italian Grand Prix.

On 22 March 2011, Chandhok was confirmed as a reserve driver at Team Lotus for the 2011 season. He drove the car in free practice for the Australian Grand Prix, crashing out on the installation lap. He reprised his co-commentary role for BBC Radio 5 Live at the Spanish Grand Prix. After driving in a further three free practice sessions he replaced Jarno Trulli for the German Grand Prix. He finished 20th and last, two laps behind teammate Heikki Kovalainen and a lap behind 19th placed Daniel Ricciardo. He was also four laps behind race winner Lewis Hamilton.

Chandhok was let go by Team Lotus after the Japanese Grand Prix, meaning he could not take part in his home Grand Prix three weeks later in India. Tony Fernandes and Chandhok came to a financial settlement, but it was not completed until April 2013.

== Endurance Racing: 2012 ==
For 2012, Chandhok drove in the FIA World Endurance Championship for JRM Racing in a Honda Performance Development ARX-03a with co-drivers David Brabham and Peter Dumbreck. At the Le Mans 24 Hours, Chandhok's team finished sixth overall out of the 56 starters.

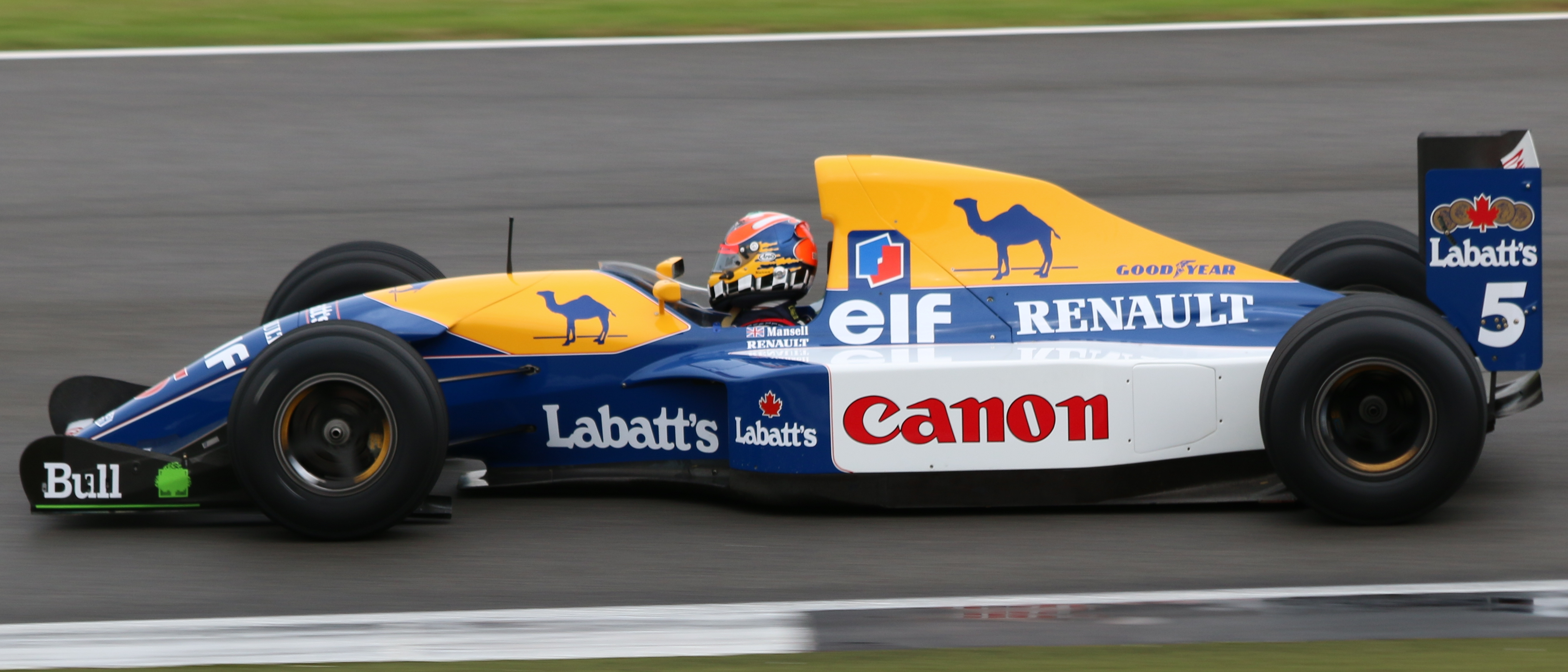
Chandhok driving Nigel Mansell's Williams FW14B as part of his role as a Williams Heritage driver

== FIA GT Series: 2013 ==
Chandhok drove in the FIA GT Series for the 2013 season in a last minute deal for Seyffarth Racing. He was joined in the car by Jan Seyffarth, who had been competing in the German GT series for his family run team. Chandhok joined Armaan Ebrahim, who became the first Indian driver to be confirmed in the series.

== Formula E: 2014–2015 ==
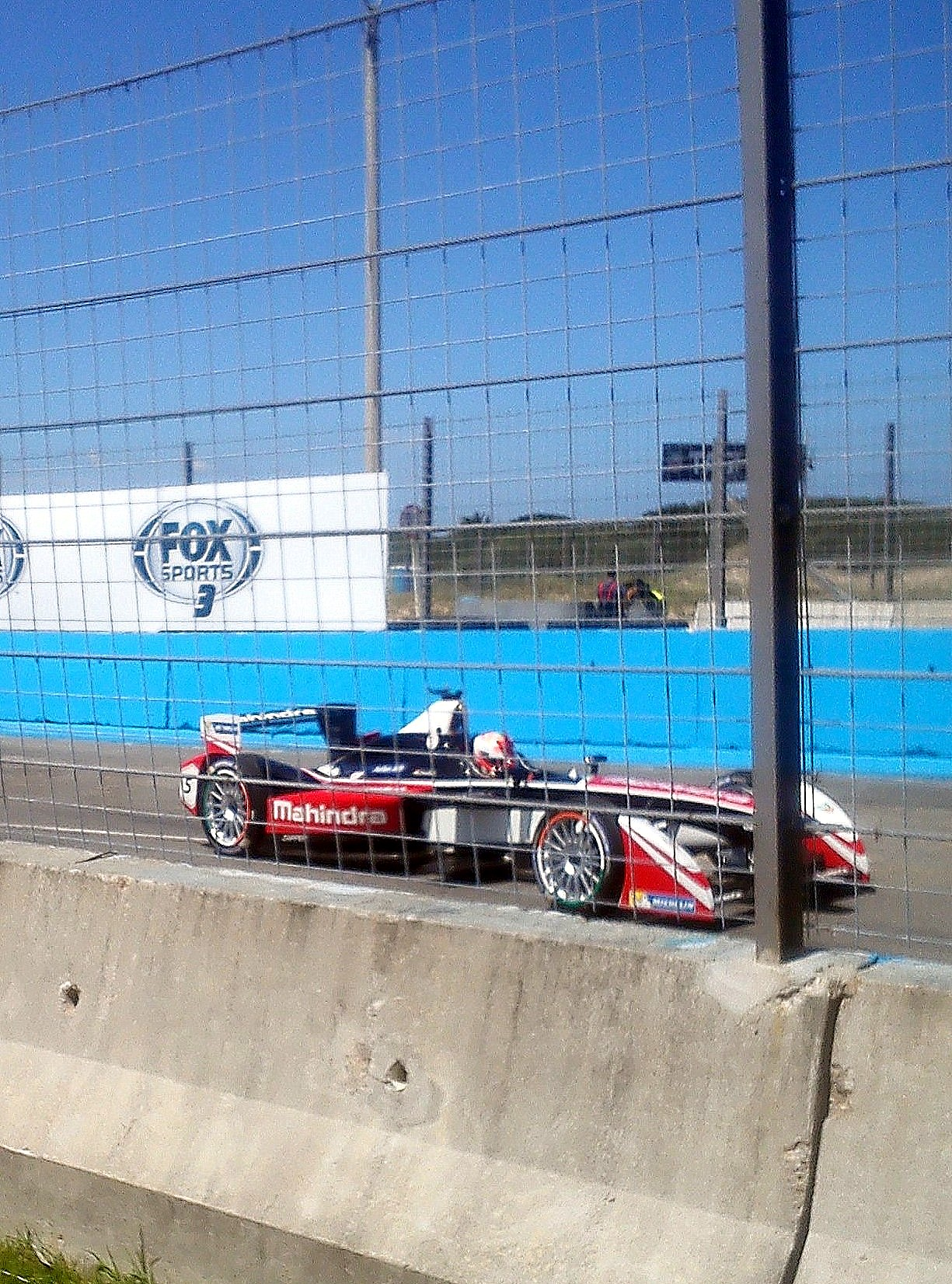
Chandhok racing in the 2014 Punta del Este ePrix

In 2014–2015, Chandhok drove the inaugural season of Formula E for Mahindra Racing.

== Media career ==
Chandhok has worked for a variety of British broadcasters as part of their coverage of Formula One including the BBC and Channel 4. As of 2025, he works for Sky Sports as an analyst as well as occasional co-commentator and pit-lane reporter. He also appeared on the Channel 5 programme Fifth Gear as a presenter and reporter.

== Racing record ==
=== Career summary ===
Season	Series	Team	Races	Wins	Poles	F/Laps	Podiums	Points	Position
2000	Formula Maruti	?	10	7	10	?	10	?	**1st**
2001	Formula 2000 Asia	SMR Team India	14	8	?	?	13	246	**1st**
2002	British Formula 3 Championship - National Class	T-Sport	25	0	0	1	5	156	6th
2003	British Formula 3 Championship - National Class	T-Sport	24	8	7	2	19	314.5	**3rd**
2004	British Formula 3 Championship	T-Sport	17	0	0	0	0	37	14th
2004	World Series by Nissan	Tata RC Motorsport	2	0	0	0	0	11	16th
2005	Formula Renault 3.5 Series	RC Motorsport	5	0	0	0	0	0	29th
2005–06	A1 Grand Prix	A1 Team India	3	0	0	0	0	38	15th
2006	Formula V6 Asia by Renault	Team E-Rain	12	7	4	4	9	131	**1st**
2007	GP2 Series	Durango	21	1	0	1	1	16	15th
2008	GP2 Series	iSport International	19	1	0	0	3	31	10th
2008	GP2 Asia Series	iSport International	10	0	0	0	1	7	13th
2008–09	GP2 Asia Series	Ocean Racing Technology	2	0	0	0	0	0	26th
2009	GP2 Series	Ocean Racing Technology	20	0	0	1	1	10	18th
2010	Formula One	Hispania Racing F1 Team	10	0	0	0	0	0	22nd
2011	Formula One	Team Lotus	1	0	0	0	0	0	28th
2012	FIA World Endurance Championship	JRM	8	0	0	0	0	50.5	10th
2013	FIA GT Series	Seyffarth Motorsport	8	0	0	1	0	32	13th
2013	FIA GT Series	Vita4one Racing Team	2	0	0	0	0	32	13th
2013	24 Hours of Le Mans - LMP2	Murphy Prototypes	1	0	0	0	0	N/A	6th
2014	European Le Mans Series - LMP2	Murphy Prototypes	2	0	0	0	0	4	24th
2014	24 Hours of Le Mans - LMP2	Murphy Prototypes	1	0	0	0	0	N/A	NC
2014–15	Formula E	Mahindra Racing	11	0	0	0	0	18	17th
2015	24 Hours of Le Mans - LMP2	Murphy Prototypes	1	0	0	0	0	N/A	6th
2016	European Le Mans Series - LMP2	Murphy Prototypes	1	0	0	0	0	4	31st
2017	24 Hours of Le Mans - LMP2	Tockwith Motorsports	1	0	0	0	0	N/A	9th
2017	British LMP3 Cup	T-Sport	2	0	0	0	1	27	10th

=== Complete British Formula Three Championship results ===
(key)

Year	Team	Chassis	Engine	Class	1	2	3	4	5	6	7	8	9	10	11	12	13	14	15	16	17	18	19	20	21	22	23	24	25	26	27	Pos	Points
2002	T-Sport	Dallara F301	Mugen-Honda	Scholarship	BRH1; 1; 21	BRH1; 2; 19	DON1; 1 Ret	DON1; 2; 14	SIL1; 1; 13	SIL1; 2; 19	KNO; 1 Ret	KNO; 2; 16	CRO; 1; 15	CRO; 2 C	SIL2; 1; 12	SIL2; 2; 20	CAS; 1 Ret	CAS; 2 Ret	BRH2; 1 DNS	BRH2; 2; 12	ROC; 1; 13	ROC; 2; 17	OUL; 1 Ret	OUL; 2; 20	SNE; 1; 13	SNE; 2 Ret	SNE; 3 Ret	THR; 1 Ret	THR; 2; 17	DON2; 1 Ret	DON2; 2; 14	6th	156
2003	T-Sport	Dallara F301	Mugen-Honda	Scholarship	DON1; 1; 10	DON1; 2; 18	SNE; 1; 13	SNE; 2; 15	**CRO**; **1**; 15	**CRO**; **2** Ret	KNO; 1; 15	KNO; 2 Ret	**SIL**; **1**; 8	**SIL**; **2**; 14	CAS; 1 Ret	CAS; 2; 20	OUL; 1; 14	OUL; 2; 12	**ROC**; **1**; 12	**ROC**; **2**; 10	THR; 1; 11	THR; 2; 14	**SPA**; **1**; 21	SPA; 2; 18	DON2; 1 Ret	DON2; 2; 14	BRH; 1; 18	BRH; 2; 15				3rd	314.5
2004	T-Sport	Dallara F304	Mugen-Honda	Championship	DON1; 1; 11	DON1; 2; 11	SIL1; 1; 14	SIL1; 2 C	CRO; 1; 8	CRO; 2; 5	KNO; 1; 6	KNO; 2; 5	SNE; 1; 14	SNE; 2 Ret	SNE; 3 Ret	CAS; 1 Ret	CAS; 2; 9	DON1; 1; 4	DON1; 2 Ret	OUL; 1 Ret	OUL; 2 DNS	SIL2; 1; 13	SIL2; 2 Ret	THR; 1	THR; 2	SPA; 1	SPA; 2	BRH; 1	BRH; 2			14th	37

=== Complete World Series by Nissan results ===
(key)

Year	Team	1	2	3	4	5	6	7	8	9	10	11	12	13	14	15	16	17	18	Pos	Points
2004	Tata RC Motorsport	JAR; 1	JAR; 2	ZOL; 1	ZOL; 2	MAG; 1	MAG; 2	VAL; 1	VAL; 2	LAU; 1	LAU; 2	EST; 1	EST; 2	CAT; 1	CAT; 2	VAL; 1 Ret	VAL; 2; 13	JER; 1; 8	JER; 2; 4	16th	11

=== Complete Formula Renault 3.5 Series results ===
(key)

Year	Team	1	2	3	4	5	6	7	8	9	10	11	12	13	14	15	16	17	Pos	Points
2005	RC Motorsport	ZOL; 1; 13	ZOL; 1; 11	MON; Ret	VAL; 1; 16	VAL; 2 Ret	LMS; 1 DNS	LMS; 2 DNS	BIL; 1	BIL; 2	OSC; 1	OSC; 2	DON; 1	DON; 2	EST; 1	EST; 2	MNZ; 1	MNZ; 2	29th	0

=== Complete A1 Grand Prix results ===
(key)

Year	Entrant	1	2	3	4	5	6	7	8	9	10	11	12	13	14	15	16	17	18	19	20	21	22	DC	Points
2005–06	India	GBR; SPR; 15	GBR; FEA; DNS	GER; SPR; 16	GER; FEA; Ret	POR; SPR	POR; FEA	AUS; SPR	AUS; FEA	MYS; SPR	MYS; FEA	UAE; SPR	UAE; FEA	RSA; SPR	RSA; FEA	IDN; SPR	IDN; FEA	MEX; SPR	MEX; FEA	USA; SPR	USA; FEA	CHN; SPR	CHN; FEA	24th	0

=== Complete Formula V6 Asia by Renault results ===
(key)

Year	Team	1	2	3	4	5	6	7	8	9	10	11	12	Pos	Points
2006	Team E-Rain	**SEP1**; **1**; 1	SEP1; 2 Ret	SEP2; 1; 3	SEP2; 2; 3	SEN; 1; 1	SEN; 2 Ret	**ZHU1**; **1**; 1	ZHU1; 2; 1	**ZHU2**; **1**; 1	ZHU2; 2; 1	**ZHU2**; **3**; 1	ZHU2; 4 Ret	1st	131

=== Complete GP2 Series results ===
(key) (Races in italics indicate fastest lap)

Year	Entrant	1	2	3	4	5	6	7	8	9	10	11	12	13	14	15	16	17	18	19	20	21	DC	Points
2007	Durango	BHR; FEA; 9	BHR; SPR; Ret	CAT; FEA; Ret	CAT; SPR; 15	MON; FEA; Ret	MAG; FEA; Ret	MAG; SPR; 16	SIL; FEA; 12	SIL; SPR; 13	NÜR; FEA; Ret	NÜR; SPR; 16	HUN; FEA; 14	HUN; SPR; 15†	IST; FEA; 8	IST; SPR; Ret	MNZ; FEA; 5	MNZ; SPR; 6	SPA; FEA; 7	SPA; SPR; 1	VAL; FEA; 17	VAL; SPR; Ret	15th	16
2008	iSport International	CAT; FEA; 9	CAT; SPR; Ret	IST; FEA; 4	IST; SPR; 12	MON; FEA; 3	MON; SPR; Ret	MAG; FEA; 7	MAG; SPR; Ret	SIL; FEA; 3	SIL; SPR; Ret	HOC; FEA; 8	HOC; SPR; 1	HUN; FEA; 4	HUN; SPR; DNS	VAL; FEA; 15†	VAL; SPR; Ret	SPA; FEA; 10	SPA; SPR; 7	MNZ; FEA; 11	MNZ; SPR; Ret		10th	31
2009	Ocean Racing Technology	CAT; FEA; Ret	CAT; SPR; Ret	MON; FEA; 7	MON; SPR; Ret	IST; FEA; 13	IST; SPR; 14	SIL; FEA; 6	SIL; SPR; 3	NÜR; FEA; 11	NÜR; SPR; Ret	HUN; FEA; 17†	HUN; SPR; 10	VAL; FEA; Ret	VAL; SPR; 6	SPA; FEA; Ret	SPA; SPR; 7	MNZ; FEA; 19†	MNZ; SPR; 12	ALG; FEA; Ret	ALG; SPR; 13		18th	10

==== Complete GP2 Asia Series results ====
(key)

Year	Entrant	1	2	3	4	5	6	7	8	9	10	11	12	DC	Points
2008	iSport International	DUB1; FEA; 7	DUB1; SPR; 3	SEN; FEA; Ret	SEN; SPR; 13	SEP; FEA; Ret	SEP; SPR; 7	BHR; FEA; 8	BHR; SPR; Ret	DUB2; FEA; Ret	DUB2; SPR; Ret			13th	7
2008–09	Ocean Racing Technology	SHI; FEA	SHI; SPR	DUB; FEA	DUB; SPR	BHR1; FEA	BHR1; SPR	LSL; FEA	LSL; SPR	SEP; FEA	SEP; SPR	BHR2; FEA; 9	BHR2; SPR; Ret	26th	0

=== Complete Formula One results ===
(key)

Year	Entrant	Chassis	Engine	1	2	3	4	5	6	7	8	9	10	11	12	13	14	15	16	17	18	19	WDC	Points
2010	Hispania Racing F1 Team	Hispania F110	Cosworth CA2010 2.4 V8	BHR; Ret	AUS; 14	MAL; 15	CHN; 17	ESP; Ret	MON; 14†	TUR; 20†	CAN; 18	EUR; 18	GBR; 19	GER	HUN	BEL	ITA	SIN	JPN	KOR	BRA	ABU	22nd	0
2011	Team Lotus	Lotus T128	Renault RS27 2.4 V8	AUS; TD	MAL	CHN	TUR; TD	ESP	MON	CAN	EUR; TD	GBR; TD	GER; 20	HUN	BEL; TD	ITA; TD	SIN	JPN; TD	KOR; TD	IND; TD	ABU	BRA	28th	0

^{†} Driver did not finish the Grand Prix, but was classified as they had completed over 90% of the race distance.

=== 24 Hours of Le Mans results ===
Year	Team	Co-Drivers	Car	Class	Laps	Pos.	Class Pos.
2012	(United Kingdom) JRM	(Australia) David Brabham (United Kingdom) Peter Dumbreck	HPD ARX-03a	LMP1	357	6th	6th
2013	(Republic of Ireland) Murphy Prototypes	(New Zealand) Brendon Hartley (United States) Mark Patterson	Oreca 03-Nissan	LMP2	319	12th	6th
2014	(Republic of Ireland) Murphy Prototypes	(France) Nathanaël Berthon (Venezuela) Rodolfo González	Oreca 03R-Nissan	LMP2	73	DNF	DNF
2015	(Republic of Ireland) Murphy Prototypes	(France) Nathanaël Berthon (United States) Mark Patterson	Oreca 03R-Nissan	LMP2	347	13th	5th
2017	(United Kingdom) Tockwith Motorsports	(United Kingdom) Phil Hanson (United Kingdom) Nigel Moore	Ligier JS P217-Gibson	LMP2	351	11th	9th

=== Complete FIA World Endurance Championship results ===
Year	Entrant	Class	Chassis	Engine	1	2	3	4	5	6	7	8	Rank	Points
2012	JRM	LMP1	HPD ARX-03	Honda LM-V8 3.4 L V8	SEB; 12	SPA; 9	LMS; 5	SIL; 7	SAO; 7	BHR; Ret	FUJ; 5	SHA; 5	10th	50.5

=== Complete FIA GT Series results ===
Year	Team	Car	Class	1	2	3	4	5	6	7	8	9	10	11	12	Pos.	Points
2013	Seyffarth Motorsport	Mercedes-Benz SLS AMG	Pro	NOG; QR; 6	NOG; CR; 10	ZOL; QR; 10	ZOL; CR; DNS	ZAN; QR; 8	ZAN; CR; 4	SVK; QR; Ret	SVK; CR; 10					13th	32
2013	Vita4one Racing Team	BMW Z4 GT3	Pro									NAV; QR; 12	NAV; CR; Ret	BAK; QR	BAK; CR	13th	32

=== Complete Formula E results ===
(key) (Races in bold indicate pole position; races in italics indicate fastest lap)

Year	Team	Chassis	Powertrain	1	2	3	4	5	6	7	8	9	10	11	Pos	Points
2014–15	Mahindra Racing	Spark SRT01-e	SRT01-e	BEI; 5	PUT; 6	PDE; 13	BUE; Ret	MIA; 14	LBH; 12	MCO; 13	BER; 18	MSC; 12	LDN; 12	LDN; 13	17th	18

=== Complete European Le Mans Series results ===
Year	Entrant	Class	Chassis	Engine	1	2	3	4	5	6	Rank	Points
2014	Murphy Prototypes	LMP2	Oreca 03	Nissan VK45DE 4.5 L V8	SIL; 8	IMO; Ret	RBR	LEC	EST		25th	4
2016	Murphy Prototypes	LMP2	Oreca 03R	Nissan VK45DE 4.5 L V8	SIL	IMO	RBR; 8	LEC	SPA	EST	31st	4

Sporting positions
Preceded by Parthiva Sureshwaren	Formula Maruti; Champion; 2000	Succeeded by ?
Preceded by Ng Wai-Leong	Formula 2000 Asia; Champion; 2001	Succeeded by Denis Lian
Preceded by Inaugural	Formula V6 Asia; Champion; 2006	Succeeded by James Winslow
