= Moreno Soeprapto =

Indonesian politician and racing driver

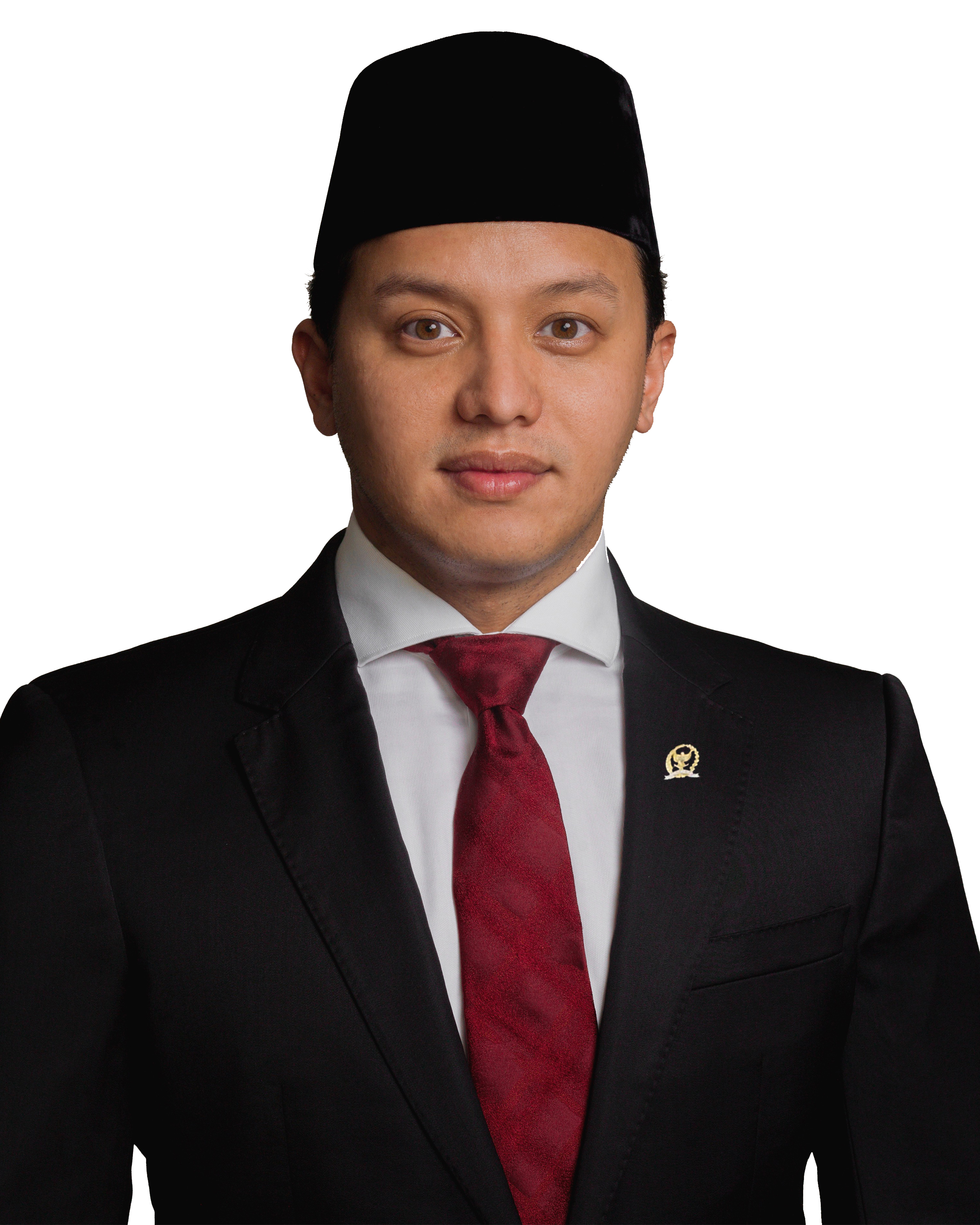
- Born: 14 November 1982 (age 43); Jakarta, Indonesia
- Occupations: Racing driver Congressman
- Years active: 1996 - 2006; 2014 - present (as a politician)
- Political party: Great Indonesia Movement Party
- Spouse: Noorani Sukardi (2017 - present)
- Parent(s): Tinton Soeprapto (father); Dewi Anggraini (mother)
- Relatives: Ananda Mikola (brother); Tora Sudiro (step-brother); Marcella Zalianty (sister-in-law); Laksamana Sukardi (father-in-law)

Moreno Soeprapto (born in Jakarta, Indonesia on November 14, 1982) is an Indonesian politician and former racing driver. He is the younger brother of Ananda Mikola, another former racing driver. Soeprapto was also a member of the Minardi F1 Academy in 2004.

== Motorsport career ==
=== Summary ===
Season	Series	Pos.	Team	Car
2004	Asian Formula Three Championship	18th	Speedtech Asia	?
2004	Formula BMW Asia	– (Note: Guest driver ineligible for points.)	Minardi Team Asia	Mygale–BMW FB02
2005	Asian Formula Three Championship	9th	Hanjin JF3	?
2006	Asian Formula Three Championship	5th	Speedtech Asia; Aran Racing	Dallara–Toyota F398
2006	Formula Renault V6 Asia	14th	Privateer	Tatuus–Nissan FV6A
2006–07	A1 Grand Prix	21st (Note: Overall championship result scored by the team, as A1 Grand Prix did not have a drivers' championship.)	A1 Team Indonesia	Lola–Zytek A1GP
2007	Asian Formula Three Championship	**3rd**	Threebond; Team Goddard	Dallara–Toyota F304
2008	Speedcar Series	21st	Speedcar Team	Speedcar–Menard V8

=== A1 Grand Prix results ===
(key) (Races in bold indicate pole position) (Races in italics indicate fastest lap)

Year	Entrant	1	2	3	4	5	6	7	8	9	10	11	12	13	14	15	16	17	18	19	20	21	22	DC	Points
2006–07	Indonesia	NED; SPR	NED; FEA	CZE; SPR	CZE; FEA	CHN1; SPR	CHN1; FEA	MLY; SPR	MLY; FEA	INA; SPR	INA; FEA	NZL; SPR	NZL; FEA	AUS; SPR	AUS; FEA	RSA; SPR	RSA; FEA	MEX; SPR	MEX; FEA	CHN2; SPR	CHN2; FEA	GBR; SPR; 17	GBR; FEA; 16	21st	1
