= Adderly Fong =

Hong Kong racing driver (b. 1990)

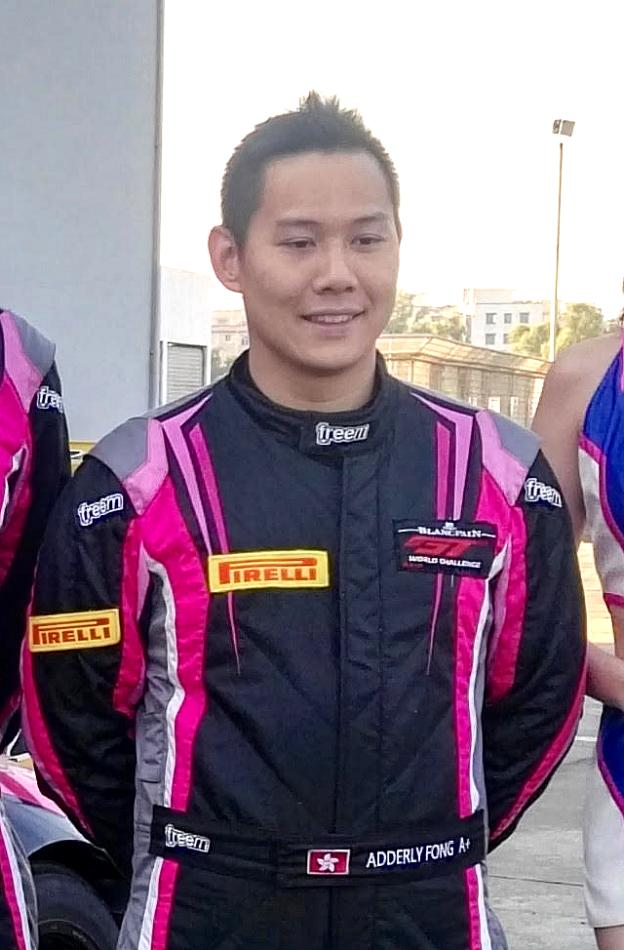
- Fong at Zhuhai International Circuit in 2019
- Nationality: (Canada) Canadian; Hong Kong
- Born: Adderly Fong Cheun-yue; March 2, 1990 (age 36) Vancouver, British Columbia, Canada

GP3 Series career
- Debut season: 2013
- Current team: Koiranen GP
- Categorisation: FIA Silver (until 2015, 2019–); FIA Gold (2016–2018)
- Car number: 11
- Former teams: Jenzer Motorsport, Status Grand Prix
- Starts: 36
- Wins: 0
- Poles: 0
- Fastest laps: 0
- Best finish: 21st in 2013

Previous series
- 2012 2010–12 2008–09 2008–09 2006–07 2006, 2008: Auto GP World Series; British Formula 3 Toyota Racing Series; German Formula Three; Formula V6 Asia; Asian Formula Renault

Championship titles
- 2013: Audi R8 LMS Cup

Adderly Fong Cheun-yue (Traditional Chinese: 方駿宇; Pinyin: Fāng Jùnyǔ; born March 2, 1990) is a Canadian-Hong Kong racing driver. His career started in 2004. He is currently competing in the Blancpain GT World Challenge Asia racing series. He also completed the 2014 24 Hours of Le Mans with OAK Racing Team Asia, finishing eleventh overall and seventh in the LMP2 class. In 2015, he was appointed as a test driver at Lotus F1 Team.

== Early career ==
Fong finished sixth in the 2007 Formula V6 Asia season. His best result was second place in Formula V6 Asia at Zhuhai in 2007.

== 2009 Toyota Racing Series (Formula Toyota New Zealand) ==
Fong drove car No. 50. in New Zealand's Toyota Racing Series and became the first Chinese driver to the series. He was supposed to race the three-round International Trophy that contested at tracks in Timaru International Motor Raceway, Invercargill's Teretonga Park and Taupo Motorsport Park. However, the result shows that he only finished his first two races in Timaru and Invercargill.

== 2010 British Formula 3 and Macau Grand Prix ==
Fong competed in the 2010 British Formula 3 for Sino Vision Racing and finished sixteenth overall. He then competed in the Macau Grand Prix. He could only qualify thirtieth and last. He finished 23rd in the qualifying race, then 21st in the main race.

== 2011 British Formula 3 and Macau Grand Prix ==
In 2011, Fong again competed in British Formula 3 and finished 22nd with five points. On 20 November 2011, he finished tenth in the 2011 Macau Grand Prix, despite damage to the right side of his car. He is the first Hong Kong driver to finish in the top-ten of the Macau F3 Grand Prix since Marchy Lee finished seventh in 2002.

== 2012 Audi R8 LMS Cup, British Formula 3 & Indy Lights ==
On 29 April, Fong took victory in round 2 of the Audi R8 LMS Cup at the Shanghai International Circuit in just his second ever sportscar race, also setting the fastest lap of the race, beating Alex Yoong and Marchy Lee. Fong scored his second Audi R8 LMS Cup victory following a dramatic last-lap coming together between then-race leaders Marchy Lee and Alex Yoong at the Zhuhai International Circuit.

On 15 June, Fong announced he would split his Audi R8 LMS Cup programme to join forces with CF Racing for the Brands Hatch, Spa-Francorchamps and Snetterton rounds of the British F3 series, he will drive a National Class-spec Dallara. On 24 June, at round 14 of the British Formula 3 International Series at Brands Hatch, Fong completed a hat-trick of National class victories for the CF Racing team, leading the class throughout.

Fong also made one start in the Firestone Indy Lights series for Brooks Associates Racing on the Streets of Baltimore where he finished eighth.

== 2013-14 GP3 Series and Audi R8 LMS Cup ==
Fong raced in the 2013 GP3 Series with Status Grand Prix. He finished 21st in the standings with only one points finish, a ninth place in Silverstone.

On 10 November 2013, Fong won the Audi R8 LMS Cup series title in Macau.

In 2014, Fong returned to GP3, this time with Jenzer Motorsport. He only competed in the first four rounds and did not score any points.

== Formula One ==
Fong tested with the Sauber Formula 1 team in 2014, completing 99 laps of the Valencia circuit in a 2012 Sauber C31. In 2015, Fong joined the Lotus Formula One team as a development driver.

== Racing record ==
=== Complete Asian Formula Renault Challenge results ===
(key) (Races in bold indicate pole position) (Races in italics indicate fastest lap)

Year	Entrant	1	2	3	4	5	6	7	8	9	10	11	12	13	14	Pos	Points
2006	Champ Motorsport	SHA1; 1	SHA1; 2	SHA2; 1; 12	SHA2; 2; 13	ZHU1; 1; 10	ZHU1; 2; 12	ZHU2; 13	SEP; 1	SEP; 2	SHA3; 1; 14	SHA3; 2; 10	SHA4; 1; 7	SHA4; 2; 5	ZHU3; 5	22nd	17

=== Complete Formula Renault V6 Asia Championship results ===
(key) (Races in bold indicate pole position) (Races in italics indicate fastest lap)

Year	Entrant	1	2	3	4	5	6	7	8	9	10	11	12	Pos	Points
2006	Champ Motorsport	SEP1; 1	SEP1; 2	SEP2; 1	SEP2; 2	SEN; 1	SEN; 2	ZHU1; 1	ZHU1; 2	ZHU2; 1	ZHU2; 2	ZHU2; 3; 6	ZHU2; 4; 3	12th	15
2007	Champ Motorsport	SEP1; 1; 5	SEP1; 2 Ret	SEP2; 1; 6	SEP2; 2 Ret	SEN; 1; 6	SEN; 2; 8	CHE; 1 Ret	CHE; 2; 4	AUT; 1 DNS	AUT; 2; 5	ZHU; 1; 5	ZHU; 2; 2	6th	51

=== Complete German Formula Three Championship results ===
(key) (Races in bold indicate pole position) (Races in italics indicate fastest lap)

Year	Entrant	Chassis	Engine	1	2	3	4	5	6	7	8	9	10	11	12	13	14	15	16	17	18	Pos	Points
2008	Performance Racing	Dallara F305	OPC-Challenge	HOC1; 1; 17	HOC1; 2; 20	OSC1; 1	OSC1; 2	NÜR1; 1	NÜR1; 2	HOC2; 1	HOC2; 2	ASS; 1 Ret	ASS; 2 Ret	NÜR2; 1; 13	NÜR2; 2; 12	LAU; 1 Ret	LAU; 2; 15	SAC; 1; 12	SAC; 2; 13	OSC2; 1; 21	OSC2; 2 DNS	22nd	0
2009	Performance Racing	Dallara F305	Volkswagen	OSC1; 1; 9	OSC1; 2; 14	NÜR1; 1; 9	NÜR1; 2; 9	HOC; 1; 17	HOC; 2; 10	OSC2; 1; 14	OSC2; 2 Ret	LAU; 1; 8	LAU; 2; 18	ASS; 1; 10	ASS; 2; 5	NÜR2; 1; 18	NÜR2; 2; 7	SAC; 1; 11	SAC; 2; 12	OSC3; 1; 11	OSC3; 2 Ret	16th	7

=== Complete British Formula Three Championship results ===
(key) (Races in bold indicate pole position) (Races in italics indicate fastest lap)

Year	Entrant	Chassis	Engine	Class	1	2	3	4	5	6	7	8	9	10	11	12	13	14	15	16	17	18	19	20	21	22	23	24	25	26	27	28	29	30	Pos	Points
2010	Sino Vision Racing	Dallara F308	Mercedes-HWA	Championship	OUL; 1; 16	OUL; 2; 17	OUL; 3; 16	SIL; 1; 23	SIL; 2 Ret	SIL; 3; 19	MAG; 1; 16	MAG; 2; 16	MAG; 3 Ret	HOC; 1; 14	HOC; 2 Ret	HOC; 3 Ret	ROC; 1; 18	ROC; 2; 20	ROC; 3; 13	SPA; 1; 23	SPA; 2; 18	SPA; 3 Ret	THR; 1; 15	THR; 2; 15	THR; 3 Ret	SIL; 1 Ret	SIL; 2; 24	SIL; 3; 18	SNE; 1; 12	SNE; 2; 16	SNE; 3; 20	BRH; 1 Ret	BRH; 2 Ret	BRH; 3; 4	16th	12
2011	Sino Vision Racing	Dallara F308	Mercedes-HWA	Championship	MNZ; 1; 13	MNZ; 2; 16	MNZ; 3; 20	OUL; 1; 16	OUL; 2; 16	OUL; 3; 11	SNE; 1; 12	SNE; 2; 14	SNE; 3; 11	BRH; 1; 11	BRH; 2; 10	BRH; 3 Ret	NÜR; 1; 15	NÜR; 2; 12	NÜR; 3; 15	LEC; 1; 17	LEC; 2; 12	LEC; 3 Ret	SPA; 1; 21	SPA; 2; 20	SPA; 3; 22	ROC; 1; 14	ROC; 2; 11	ROC; 3 Ret	DON; 1; 16	DON; 2; 12	DON; 3; 7	SIL; 1; 18	SIL; 2; 17	SIL; 3; 16	22nd	5
2012	CF Racing	Dallara F311	Mugen-Honda	Rookie	OUL; 1	OUL; 2	OUL; 3	MNZ; 1	MNZ; 2	MNZ; 3	PAU; 1	PAU; 2	ROC; 1	ROC; 2	ROC; 3	**BRH**; **1**; 12	BRH; 2; 12	**BRH**; **3**; 11	NOR; 1	NOR; 2	NOR; 3	SPA; 1; 27	SPA; 2 C	SPA; 3; 17	SNE; 1; 8	SNE; 2; 9	**SNE**; **3**; 12	SIL; 1	SIL; 2	SIL; 3	DON; 1	DON; 2	DON; 3		3rd	161

=== Complete Superleague Formula results ===
(key)

Year	Team	Operator	1	2	3	4	5	6	7	8	9	10			11			12	Position	Points
2010	PSV Eindhoven	Atech GP/Reid Motorsport	SIL	ASS	MAG	JAR	NÜR	ZOL	BRH	ADR	POR	ORD			BEI†			NAV	16th	288
2010	PSV Eindhoven	Atech GP/Reid Motorsport										10	11	X					16th	288
2010	Team China	Atech GP/Reid Motorsport													10	DN	C		19th	26

† Non-championship round

=== Complete Auto GP World Series results ===
(key) (Races in bold indicate pole position) (Races in italics indicate fastest lap)

Year	Entrant	1	2	3	4	5	6	7	8	9	10	11	12	13	14	Pos	Points
2012	Ombra Racing	MNZ; 1; 13	MNZ; 2; 7	VAL; 1	VAL; 2	MAR; 1	MAR; 2	HUN; 1 Ret	HUN; 2; 13	ALG; 1	ALG; 2	CUR; 1	CUR; 2	SON; 1	SON; 2	21st	4

=== Complete Indy Lights results ===
Year	Team	1	2	3	4	5	6	7	8	9	10	11	12	Rank	Points
2012	Brooks Associates Racing	STP	ALA	LBH	INDY	DET	MIL	IOW	TOR	EDM	TRO	BAL; 8	FON	25th	24

=== Complete GP3 Series results ===
(key) (Races in bold indicate pole position) (Races in italics indicate fastest lap)

Year	Entrant	1	2	3	4	5	6	7	8	9	10	11	12	13	14	15	16	17	18	D.C.	Points
2013	Status Grand Prix	CAT; FEA; 23	CAT; SPR; 11	VAL; FEA; Ret	VAL; SPR; Ret	SIL; FEA; 9	SIL; SPR; Ret	NÜR; FEA	NÜR; SPR	HUN; FEA; 20	HUN; SPR; 17	SPA; FEA; Ret	SPA; SPR; 16	MNZ; FEA; 19	MNZ; SPR; 20†	YMC; FEA; 17	YMC; SPR; 21			21st	2
2014	Jenzer Motorsport	CAT; FEA; Ret	CAT; SPR; 12	RBR; FEA; Ret	RBR; SPR; 15	SIL; FEA; 21	SIL; SPR; 11	HOC; FEA; 15	HOC; SPR; 12	HUN; FEA	HUN; SPR	SPA; FEA	SPA; SPR	MNZ; FEA	MNZ; SPR	SOC; FEA	SOC; SPR	YMC; FEA	YMC; SPR	24th	0
2015	Koiranen GP	CAT; FEA; 17	CAT; SPR; 21	RBR; FEA; 17	RBR; SPR; 12	SIL; FEA; 13	SIL; SPR; 14	HUN; FEA; 15	HUN; SPR; 11	SPA; FEA; 15	SPA; SPR; 9	MNZ; FEA	MNZ; SPR	SOC; FEA; 15	SOC; SPR; 18	BHR; FEA	BHR; SPR			23rd	0
2015	Carlin																	YMC; FEA; Ret	YMC; SPR; 22	23rd	0

^{†} Driver did not finish the race, but was classified as he completed over 90% of the race distance.

=== 24 Hours of Le Mans results ===
Year	Team	Co-Drivers	Car	Class	Laps	Pos.	Class Pos.
2014	(France) OAK Racing-Team Asia	(China) David Cheng (China) Ho-Pin Tung	Ligier JS P2-Honda	LMP2	347	11th	7th

=== Complete Formula One participations ===
(key) (Races in bold indicate pole position; races in italics indicates fastest lap)

Year	Entrant	Chassis	Engine	1	2	3	4	5	6	7	8	9	10	11	12	13	14	15	16	17	18	19	WDC	Points
2014	Sauber F1 Team	Sauber C33	Ferrari 059/3 1.6 V6 t	AUS	MAL	BHR	CHN	ESP	MON	CAN	AUT	GBR	GER	HUN	BEL	ITA	SIN	JPN	RUS	USA	BRA	ABU; TD	-	-

Sporting positions
Preceded by Marchy Lee	Audi R8 LMS Cup; Champion; 2013	Succeeded by Alex Yoong
