= Marchy Lee =

Hong Kong racing driver (born 1976)

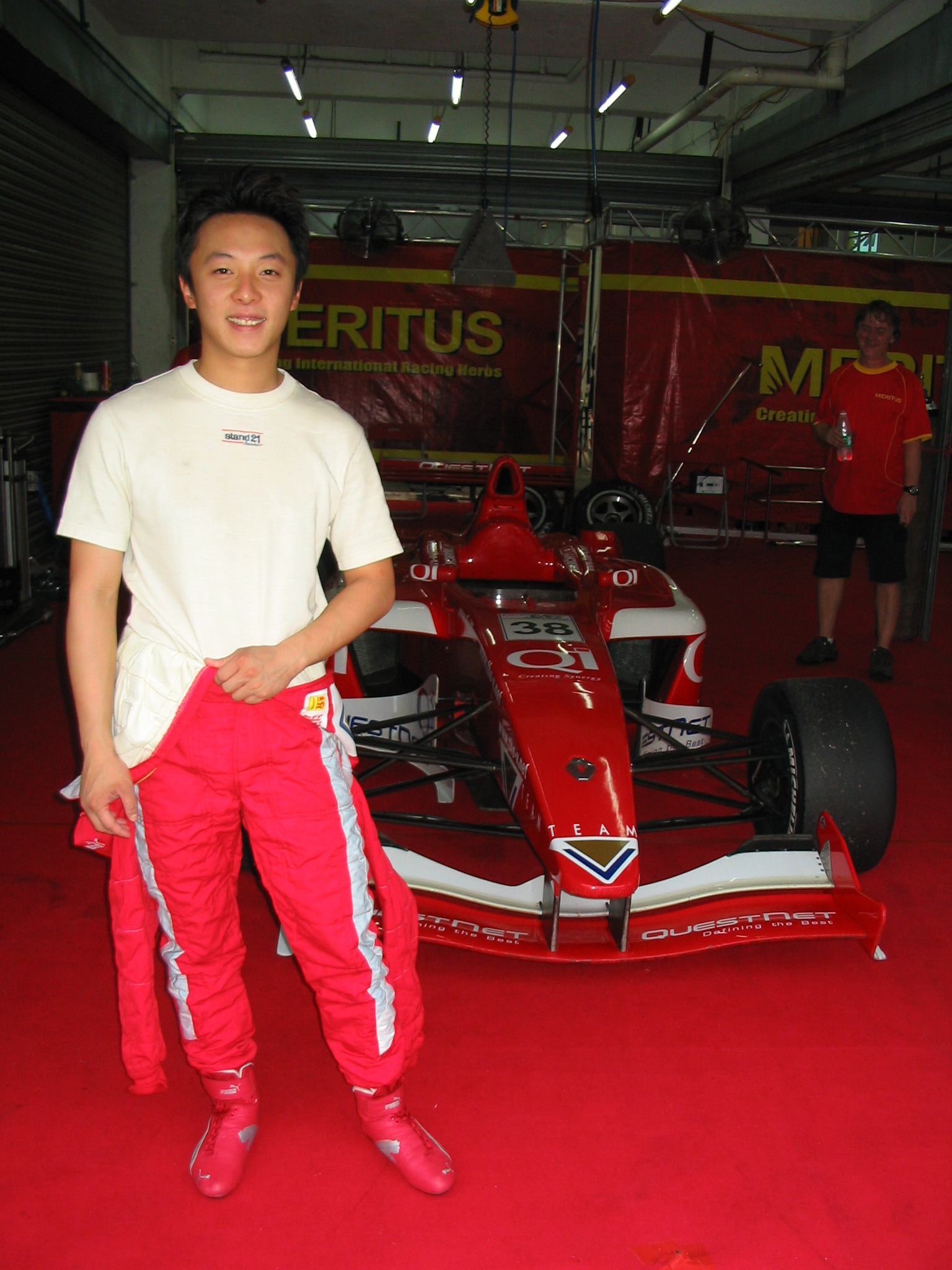
- Marchy Lee preparing to race in the Formula Asia V6 by Renault race
- Nationality: Hong Kong
- Born: 2 September 1976 (age 50) British Hong Kong

Audi R8 LMS Cup career
- Debut season: 2012
- Current team: Audi Ultra
- Categorisation: FIA Silver
- Car number: 1
- Starts: 12
- Wins: 3
- Poles: 4
- Best finish: 1st in 2012

Previous series
- 2011 2010: World Touring Car Championship; Porsche Carrera Cup Asia

Championship titles
- 2012 2004: Audi R8 LMS Cup; Formula BMW Asia

Marchy Lee Ying-Kin (Traditional Chinese: 李英健) is a racing driver from Hong Kong. Born in 1976 in Hong Kong, Marchy started his racing career at just nine years old and has become one of the top racecar drivers in Hong Kong.

He is the first Formula 3 driver from Hong Kong and has competed in the Macau Grand Prix.

Marchy currently resides in Hong Kong with his wife and two daughters.

== Early career ==
Marchy was born on 2 September 1976 in Hong Kong. Marchy's father was also a racing driver and he has been karting at a young age. When the Zhuhai International Circuit was built in 1996, he enrolled in the inaugural China Formula Campus Championship. Upon winning the championship, he received a scholarship to join the La Filière racing school in Le Mans, France to continue his development.

Marchy spent three years in France, progressing from Formula Campus to French Formula 3, achieving respectable results.

But his funding ran out and he returned to Asia afterwards, competing in some Asian and Australian F3 races. He won two Asian Formula 3 races at Sepang and finished sevenh in the Macau Formula 3 Grand Prix.

In August 2003, driving a Dallara F301 Renault, Marchy took pole position in the Australian Formula 3 race at Phillip Island in treacherous conditions.

Later that year Marchy won two Formula BMW Asia races in Beijing and finished second to Hideaki Nakao in the Formula Renault race in Macau. He also took part in the Porsche Carrera Cup Asia race and finished fifth, despite a problem with the gas pedal, behind Alex Yoong, Charles Kwan, Matthew Marsh and Nigel Albon.

== Formula BMW Asia, F1 and Formula Asia V6 ==
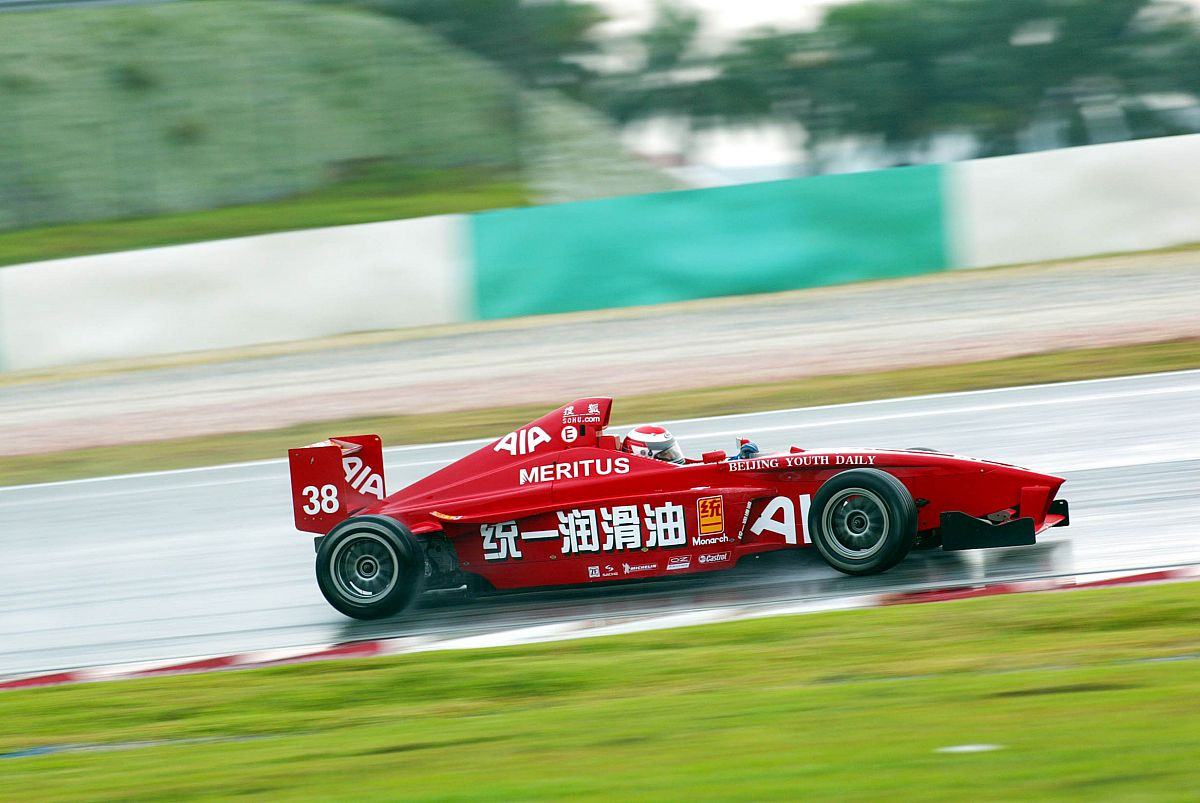
Marchy racing in Formula BMW Asia in 2004.

In 2004, Marchy teamed up with the top Asian racing outfit, Team Meritus, to race in the Formula BMW Asia series. He won 12 races out of 14, making him the first Chinese formula racing champion in an international series. Lee received an extra prize in recognition of his extraordinary achievements – a three-day test with the Team Rosberg Formula 3 outfit.

After winning the 2004 Formula BMW Asia title, Marchy also had the chance to test an F1 car with the Minardi team at Mugello, but his run ended up being called off due to a logistics problem.

Marchy failed to get any sponsorship deals in 2005 and 2006 to support a full season's racing. But a last-minute deal allowed him to reunite with Team Meritus in the Formula Asia V6 by Renault race at Zhuhai. He finished a strong second in the final round of the season to Matt Halliday and set the fastest race lap in the process, rekindling his hopes of racing professionally again in 2007 and beyond.

== 2007 ==
Marchy raced in the Asian Super Car Challenge in Zhuhai on 24–25 March, claiming one win and one second place in the Ferrari 430. He then drove in the Porsche Carrera Cup Asia in Sepang where he finished second twice.

Marchy was confirmed as Meritus Racing's driver for the 2007 Formula Asia V6 by Renault series. He hoped that by achieving success in the series, he would be able to progress to the Champ Car World Series in 2008.

On 13 July 2007, Marchy was announced as the driver for a new team set up by Adrian Fu to compete in the remainder of the Porsche Carrera Cup Asia series under the banner "Racing for Charity", to help increase the profile and visibility of the Child's Dream Foundation.

On 1 August 2007, it was announced by A1 Team China that he would join the rookie test at the end of August at Silverstone, alongside three other drivers. The best performer from this test would join Cheng Congfu as China's two A1GP representatives.

On 20 September 2007, Marchy was officially announced as the second driver for A1 Team China. He made his debut for the team in round 2 in the Czech Republic on 12 October 2007. He gathered data for the team in the rookie sessions. Cheng Congfu went on to score tenth and fourth-place finishes.

On 4 November 2007, Marchy took part in the Porsche Carrera Cup Asia at Zhuhai International Circuit and won both rounds 11 and 12.

On 18 November 2007, Marchy also took part in the Porsche Carrera Cup Asia race in Macau, and finished fourth on the road (later promoted to third place after on the road winner Danny Watts was given a 30-second penalty for passing under a yellow flag.)

== 2008 Speedcar Series & Porsche Carrera Cup Asia ==
Marchy became the first Chinese driver to race in the inaugural Speedcar Series. He drove car no. 50. He failed to finish his first two races in Malaysia, as well as his first race in Bahrain, but took 4th place in race 2. He then finished fifth and third in the two races in Dubai.

Marchy also competed in the Porsche Carrera Cup Asia. Racing for Team BetterLife, he finished second and fourth in the opening rounds at Sepang. Then he took second and fifth in round 2 at Shanghai.

== 2010 Porsche Carrera Cup Asia ==
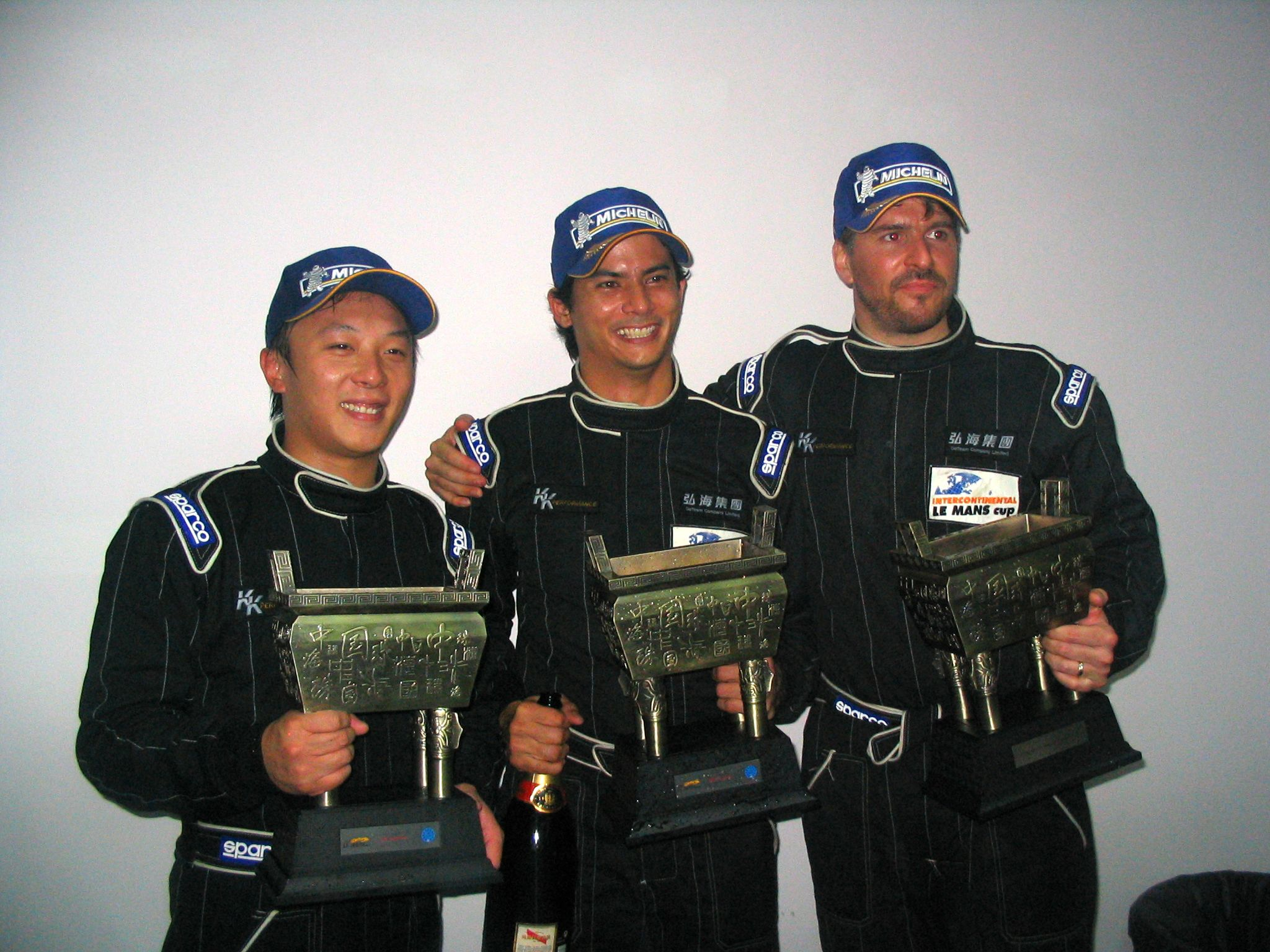
Marchy Lee, Alex Yoong and Matthew Marsh (from left to right) with their Intercontinental Le Mans Cup – 1000km of Zhuhai GTC class winners' trophies.

In 2010, Marchy raced in the Porsche Carrera Cup Asia for Red Bull Racing (team is run by Dynaten Motorsports). He scored two wins at Zhuhai in June. At the last round in Zhuhai, the Hong Kong racer, who began as the only other championship contender, fought hard every inch of the way battling first Simonsen and then Christian Menzel, but he could not do enough to stay in the running and became championship runner-up for 2010.

On 7 November 2011, Marchy partnered Matthew Marsh and Alex Yoong to drive an Audi R8 LMS for KK Performance (Again, team is run by Dynaten Motorsport) in the 2010 1000 km of Zhuhai race, part of the Intercontinental Le Mans Cup. Starting eleventh on the grid, the Audi R8 LMS No. 98 was at the heart of the race, before inheriting the lead of GTC after the retirement of the sister car of United Autosport. Lee, Yoong and Marsh took the chequered flag in 12th position overall.

Two weeks later, on 21 November 2010, Marchy drove the same Audi R8 LMS race car to second place in the Macau GT Cup, beaten only by defending champion Keita Sawa's Lamborghini LP560 GT3.

== 2011 World Touring Car Championship ==
On 10 March 2011, Marchy announced that he would join the 2011 World Touring Car Championship with KK Motorsports. However, he left the championship after just three rounds.

== 2012 Audi R8 LMS Cup ==
On 11 November 2012, Marchy became the first ever Audi R8 LMS Cup Champion after crossing the line second in the twelfth and final round at the Shanghai International Circuit.

== Racing career ==
- 2015 Nurburgring 24h
- 2015 Blancpain GT Endurance Championship
- 2015 Audi R8 LMS Cup
- 2014 Audi R8 LMS Cup - 5th place overall
- 2013 Macau GT Cup - 4th-place finish
- 2013 Audi R8 LMS Cup - 3rd place overall
- 2012 Audi R8 LMS Cup – Champion
- 2010 Macau GT Cup – 2nd place
- 2010 Intercontinental Le Mans Cup – 1000 km of Zhuhai – GTC class win
- 2010 Porsche Carrera Cup Asia – 2nd overall
- 2006 Formula Asia V6 by Renault (Round 12, Zhuhai) – 2nd & fastest lap
- 2004 Formula BMW Asia Series – Champion (12 wins out of 14 races)
- 2003 Formula Renault (Macau) – 2nd
- 2003 Formula BMW Asia (Beijing) – 1st & 2nd
- 2002 Macau Formula 3 Grand Prix – 7th
- 2000 French Formula 3 Championship (Class A) – 9th
- 1999 French Formula 3 Championship (Class B) – 5th in class
- 1998 French Formula Campus – 4th overall
- 1997 China Formula Campus – Champion

=== Complete WTCC results ===
(key) (Races in bold indicate pole position) (Races in italics indicate fastest lap)

| Year | Team | Car | 1 | 2 | 3 | 4 | 5 | 6 | 7 | 8 | 9 | 10 | 11 | 12 | 13 | 14 | 15 | 16 | 17 | 18 | 19 | 20 | 21 | 22 | 23 | 24 | DC | Points |
|---|---|---|---|---|---|---|---|---|---|---|---|---|---|---|---|---|---|---|---|---|---|---|---|---|---|---|---|---|
| 2011 | DeTeam KK Motorsport | BMW 320 TC | BRA; 1; 16 | BRA; 2; 16 | BEL; 1 Ret | BEL; 2 DNS | ITA; 1; 20 | ITA; 2; 14 | HUN; 1 | HUN; 2 | CZE; 1 | CZE; 2 | POR; 1 | POR; 2 | GBR; 1 | GBR; 2 | GER; 1 | GER; 2 | ESP; 1 | ESP; 2 | JPN; 1 | JPN; 2 | CHN; 1 | CHN; 2 | MAC; 1 | MAC; 2 | NC | 0 |

Sporting positions
| Preceded by Ho-Pin Tung | Formula BMW Asia; Champion; 2004 | Succeeded by Salman Al Khalifa |
| Preceded by None | Audi R8 LMS Cup; Champion; 2012 | Succeeded by Adderly Fong |
