= Seth Ingham =

American racing driver

Seth Ingham (born October 24, 1984) is an American racing driver from Yakima, Washington.

In 2005, Ingham won the Formula TR 2000 Pro Series championship. The following year, he raced in Formula V6 Asia and finished fourth in the championship, his best finish coming in heat one of the second race weekend held at Sepang International Circuit. He returned to the series the following year and won heat 2 in the first Sepang race. However, he left the series after the second Sepang race weekend. He raced in the 24 Hours of Daytona in 2007 and 2008 for Matt Connelly Motorsports in their long-in-the-tooth Chase-Pontiac Daytona Prototype. The car failed to finish both years.
