= Tennell =

Tennell is a surname. Notable people with the surname include:

- Adron Tennell (born 1987), American football player
- Bradie Tennell (born 1998), American figure skater
- Derek Tennell (born 1964), American football player

== See also ==
- Mennell
