= Automotive industry in Serbia =

Serbia's automotive industry is one of the most important industrial sectors and makes about 15% of industrial output of the country and 18% of all exports (expected to reach $2 billion in 2013).

== History ==
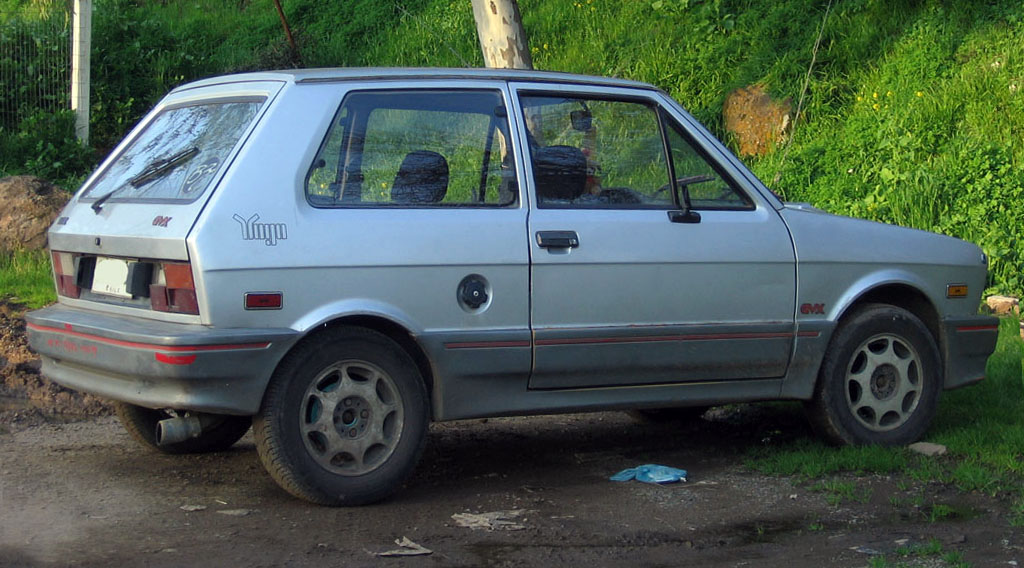
The iconic Yugo was manufactured by Zastava.

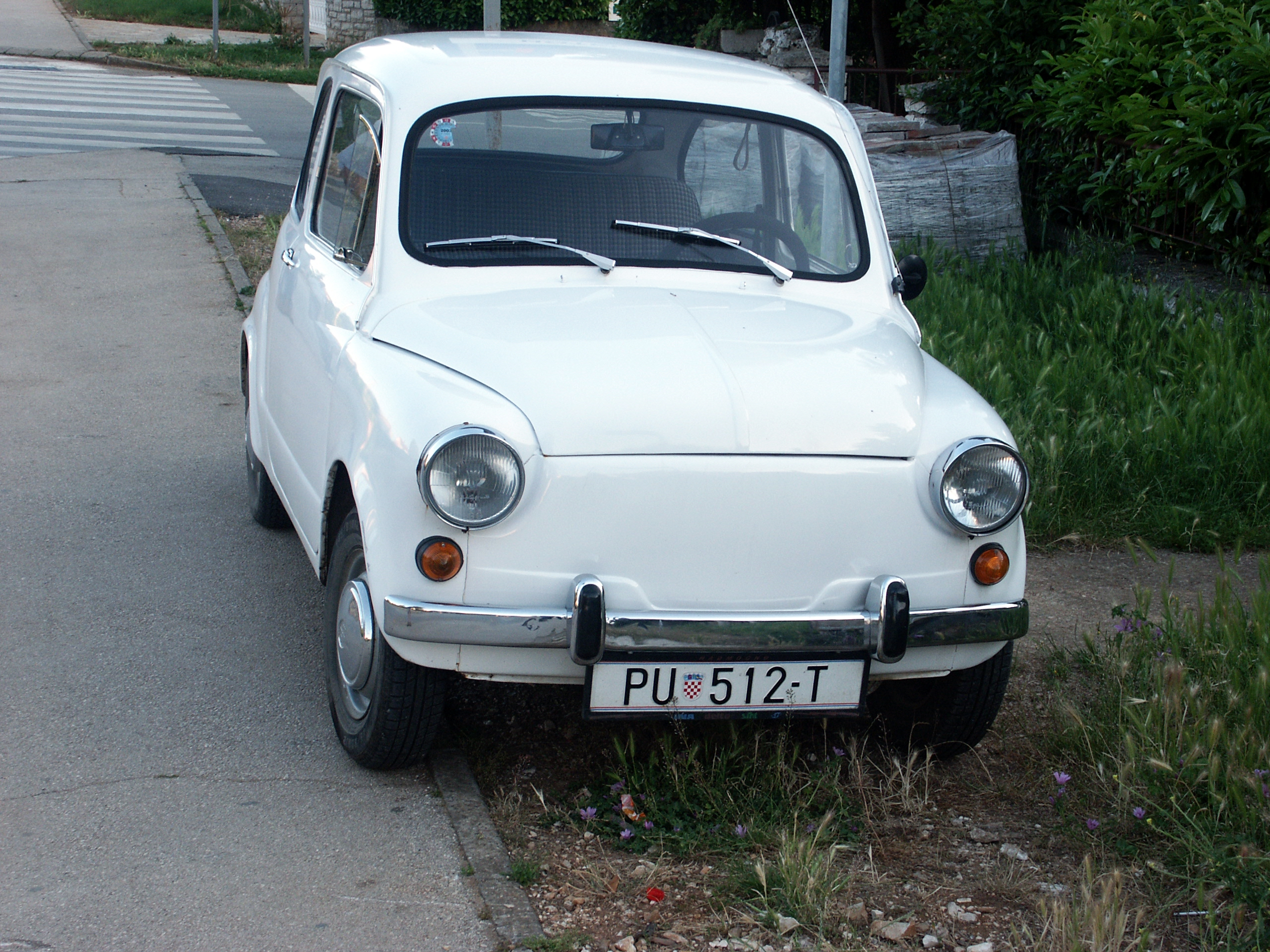
Zastava 750

The Serbian automotive industry has its roots at very beginning of the 20th century, when, in 1904, the industrial military complex Zastava created a section dedicated to automobile repair and manufacture of certain parts.

=== Yugoslav era ===
In 1939, Zastava began assembling Chevrolet trucks. Production came to an end with the start of the Second World War. Until 1941, the factory in Kragujevac produced 400 Chevrolet military trucks and the automotive section of the Zastava industrial complex employed 12,000 workers.

By becoming one of the founders and leaders of the Non-Aligned Movement, Yugoslavia became one of the places where on the road and in the traffic one could see cars from both blocks of the Cold War, plus the ones from neutral or the Non-Aligned countries. However, besides the imports, Yugoslavia offered a variety of domestic cars built for diverse tastes and necessities. Besides the pre-war Zastava-General Motors agreement about building 4x4 vehicles, Zastava would sign in the 1950s an agreement with Italian manufacturer FIAT that would last, in some form or another, until 2008, and almost 2 million vehicles were produced.

Meantime, in Slovenian seaport town of Koper on the Adriatic, in 1984, local factory Tomos and French manufacturer Citroën created a joint-venture named Cimos. Besides the Citroën 2CV and the Citroën DS, they also produced Ami, Dyane, AX, BW, CX, Visa and GS.

Another Slovenian company, IMV from Novo Mesto, reached an agreement with British Austin Motor Company to assemble, since 1967, models such as 1300, 1500, 1750 and, the worldwide famous, Mini. In 1972, IMV made a strategic partnership with Renault and started producing the popular Renault 4. Besides this model, they also produced the Renault 12, Renault 16, Renault 18 and Renault 5 for the Yugoslav market.

SR Bosnia and Herzegovina entered into car manufacturing through a kitchen appliances manufacturer. In a process in which Yugoslav president Tito polemically dislocated most of the surviving Serbian industrial centers into Croatia and Bosnia thus even further weakening the Serbian economy, these other republics took advantage to recover, and in case of Bosnia, specifically regarding the automotive industry, it was with the direct initiative from president Tito that obligated one successful company, PRETIS, to become involved in car production, since they already dealt with aluminium and other metals. That same year Pretis factory in Vogošća started assembling NSU Prinz. Around 15.000 of this cars were made, when Volkswagen took charge of the mother company, and used the advantage and the facilities which Yugoslav government were giving them. UNIS become the main company, replacing Pretis, The experience was positive and the collaboration lasted for some years. However, Volkswagen saw a great chance to expand to Serbian market. The major impact came soon after the Beetle. Around 1.300 units were built between 1972 and 1976 in three versions: 1200, 1300 and 1303.

In 1953, at the centenary of the company, Zastava signed a contract with Italian manufacturer FIAT to start the production of several models under licence, including trucks, passenger cars, tractors and heavy-duty vehicles. In 1955 the production started of what became the most popular model, the Zastava 750, which counted a total of 923,487 units produced. In 1965 Zastava started exporting abroad. United States imported over 140,000 Zastava vehicles, sold as Yugos. In 1989 Zastava produced a record 230,570 units. All in all, Zastava produced over 4 million vehicles between 1953 and 2001, and exported to 74 countries, making Kragujevac the center of the automotive industry of Serbia and the entire Yugoslav federation. However, the facilities of the Zastava industrial complex were heavily damaged during the NATO bombing of FR Yugoslavia in 1999.

Zastava's suppliers manufactured under strict, high-quality production standards that enabled them to work with other western car manufacturers such as Mercedes, Ford, Peugeot Citroën-PSA Renault, and Opel. This was also necessary to meet Yugoslav obstacles to importing fully-built-up cars. Zastava also assembled Fiats and various Fiats built in the Eastern Bloc for sale locally. Second-biggest manufacturer IMV manufactured Renaults (replacing original Western partners Austin, NSU and BMW) in Novo Mesto, Slovenia, Tvornica Automobila Sarajevo (TAS) built Volkswagens in Sarajevo in Bosnia-Herzegovina, Cimos built Citroëns in Koper, Slovenia, and fifth-placed IDA assembled Opels. Local assemblers had to form joint ventures with Western operators to sell their wares in Yugoslavia, usually exporting locally made parts in return for CKD kits. There was also a brief attempt by a company called Invest-Metali to assemble Peugeots in Pristina, Kosovo, starting with 750 cars delivered in 1985. This company seized trading in 1991 and it is unknown whether any more cars were assembled by them.

Although 211,522 cars were officially built in Yugoslavia in 1983, many were partially knocked down imports and some were misclassified imports. Full imports were officially only available to those who were able to pay entirely in hard currency, which limited such sales to a trickle. In 1984, fully built-up imports from the West (excluding locally assembled cars) represented less than 4 percent of the market. Although Japanese manufacturers Toyota and then Mitsubishi both entered the market on a limited scale in the first half of the 1980s, nearly all Western imports were of European brands. The number one selling import was the Fiat Uno, of which over 300 were sold in 1984.

=== Contemporary era ===
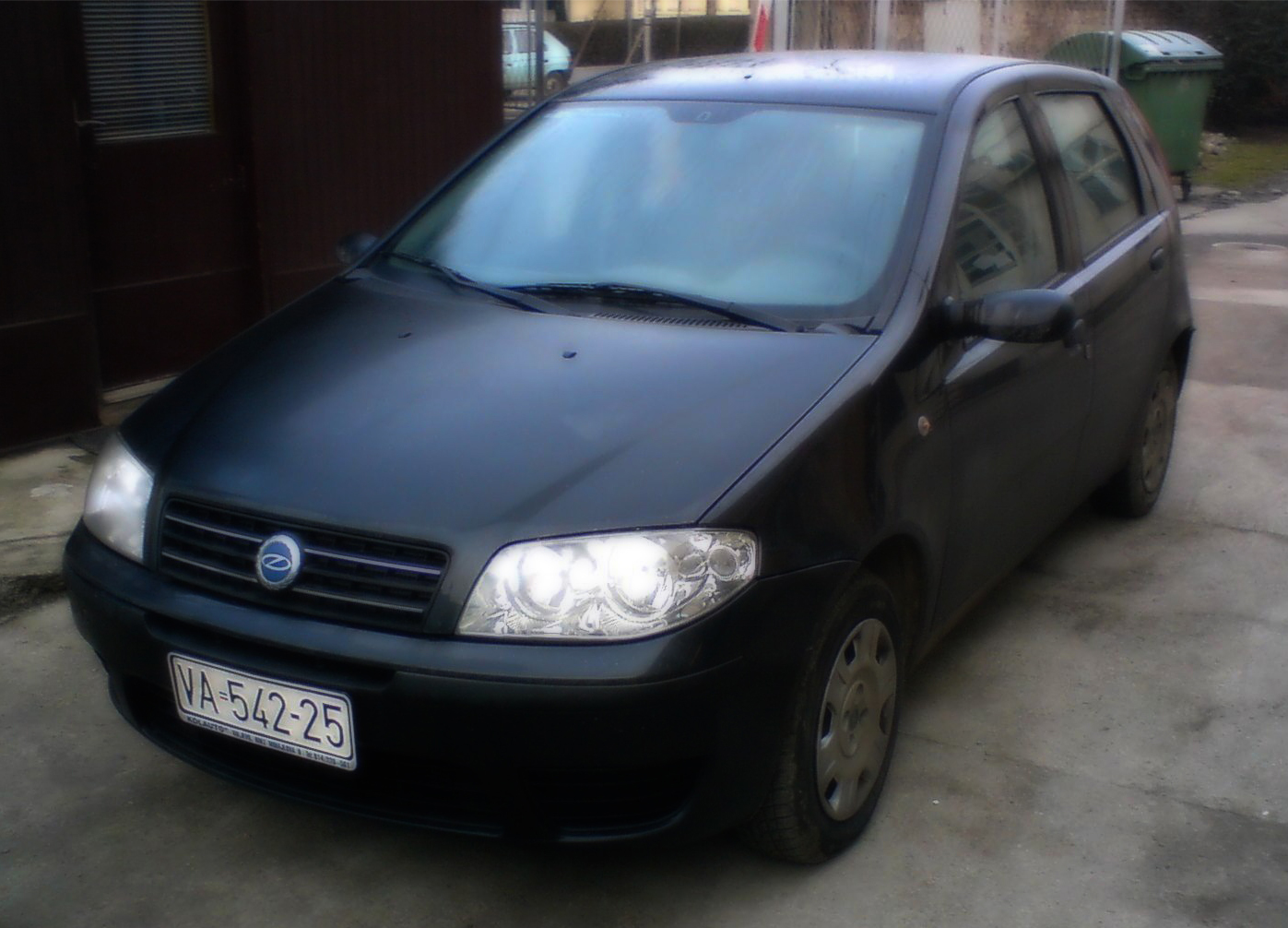
Zastava 10

Today, the automotive industry is one of the most prominent sectors in Serbia, accounting for almost 10% of the entire FDI stock in Serbia since 2000. 27 international investors have invested almost €1.5 billion in the sector, creating more than 19,000 jobs. The Serbian automotive industry supplies almost all major European and some Asian car manufacturers.

The manufacturing of vehicle chassis system parts, especially tires and suspension parts is the most prominent activity in the industry. Electrical system components are another dominant product group with car batteries and wiring installations as the most important products. Also, the production of engine components, mostly cast, is very significant, along with forged and machined parts like camshafts, brake discs, valves and flywheels.

Among these manufacturing companies are: Tigar Tyres, Leoni Wiring Systems Southeast, Yura Corporation, Cooper Tire & Rubber Company Serbia, Trayal Corporation and IGB Automotive.

== Active manufacturers ==
=== FCA Srbija ===
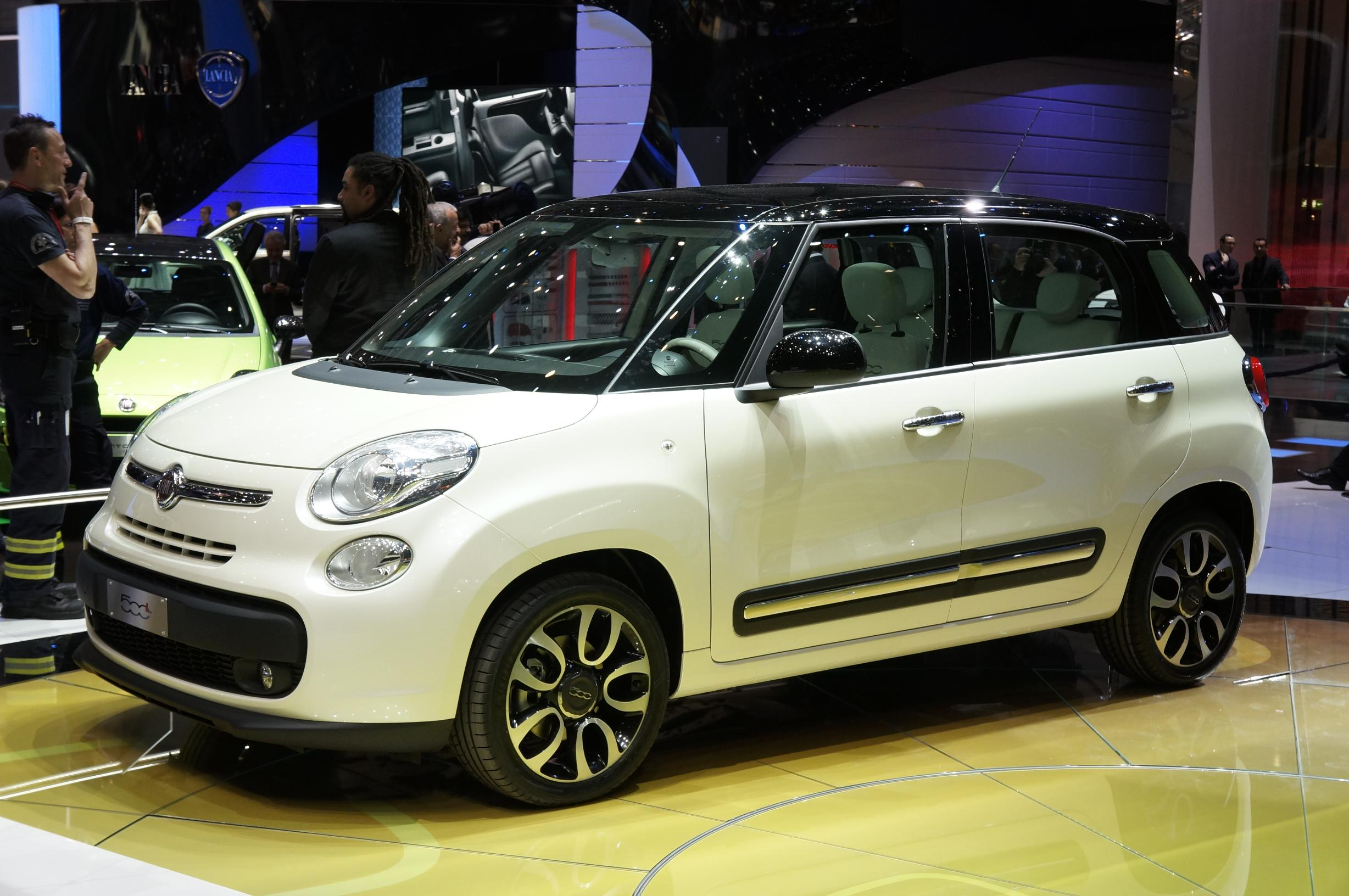
The Fiat 500L was manufactured in Kragujevac in 2010s

In 2008, FIAT entered a joint venture (JV) with the Republic of Serbia, creating what would become known as FCA Srbija. The JV extensively renovated and remodeled the former headquarters facility and assembly plant of Zastava Automobiles, and now manufactures the Fiat 500L, with an annual capacity of 85,000 cars (as of 2016).

=== FAP ===
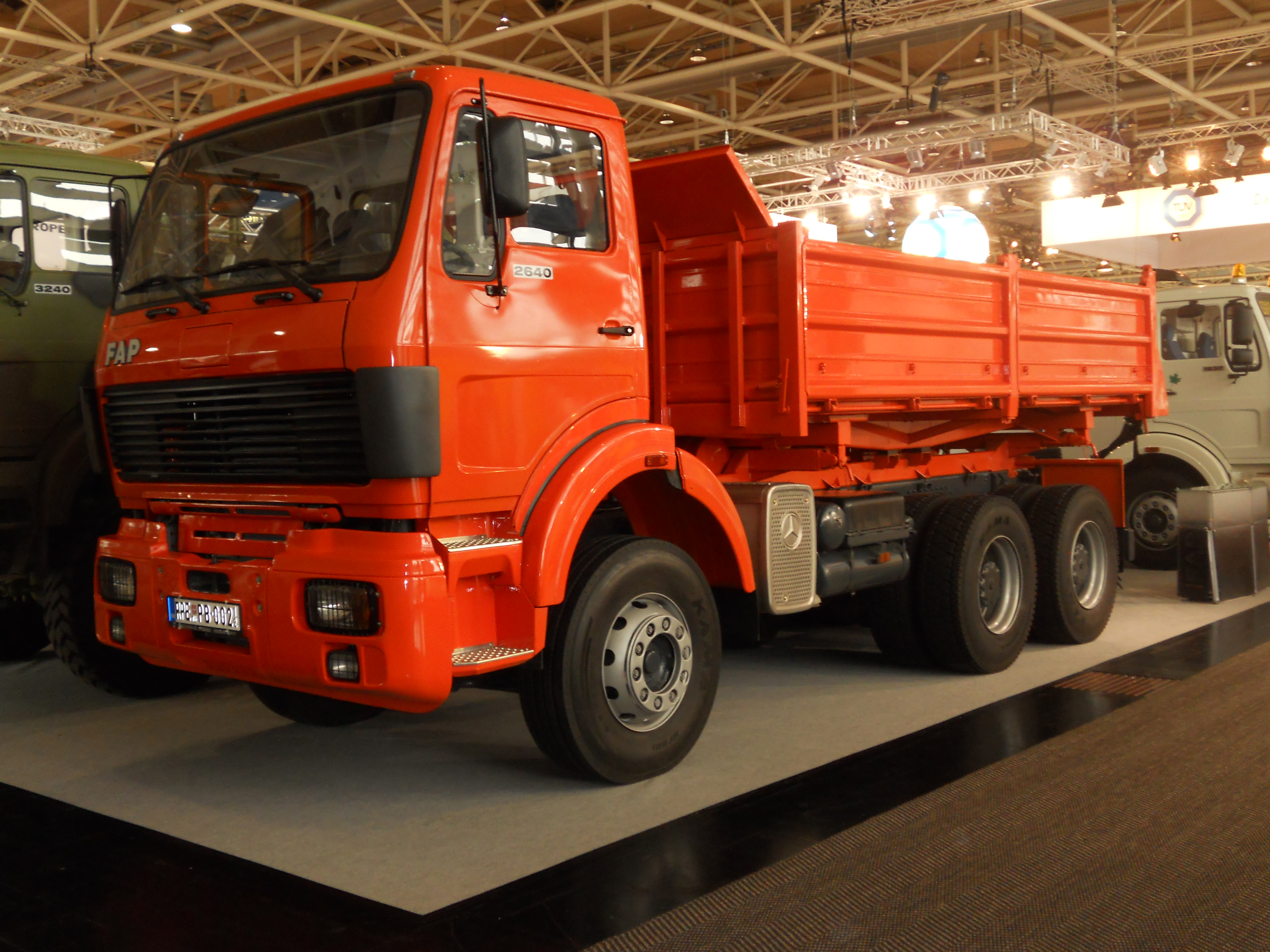
FAP 2640 dump rigid truck three-axle

In 1952 Fabrika automobila Priboj (FAP) was founded and a year later the first trucks were produced based on a licence from Saurer. First domestically designed vehicles where introduced in serial production by 1965. In 1970 a production, technical and financial cooperation contract was signed by FAP with Daimler-Benz. In 1978 FAP began its collaboration with the Military Technical Institute Belgrade and started developing and producing special military vehicles. Since the 2010s, FAP has military oriented and heavily limited production.

=== Zastava TERVO ===
Part of Zastava conglomerate company in Kragujevac, TERVO was formed on 1 September 2017 with all fixed and current assets of Zastava Trucks including most of its former employees. Produces terrain vehicles for military and civilian use and armored cabins and parts for military vehicles.

== Defunct manufacturers ==
=== IDA-Opel ===
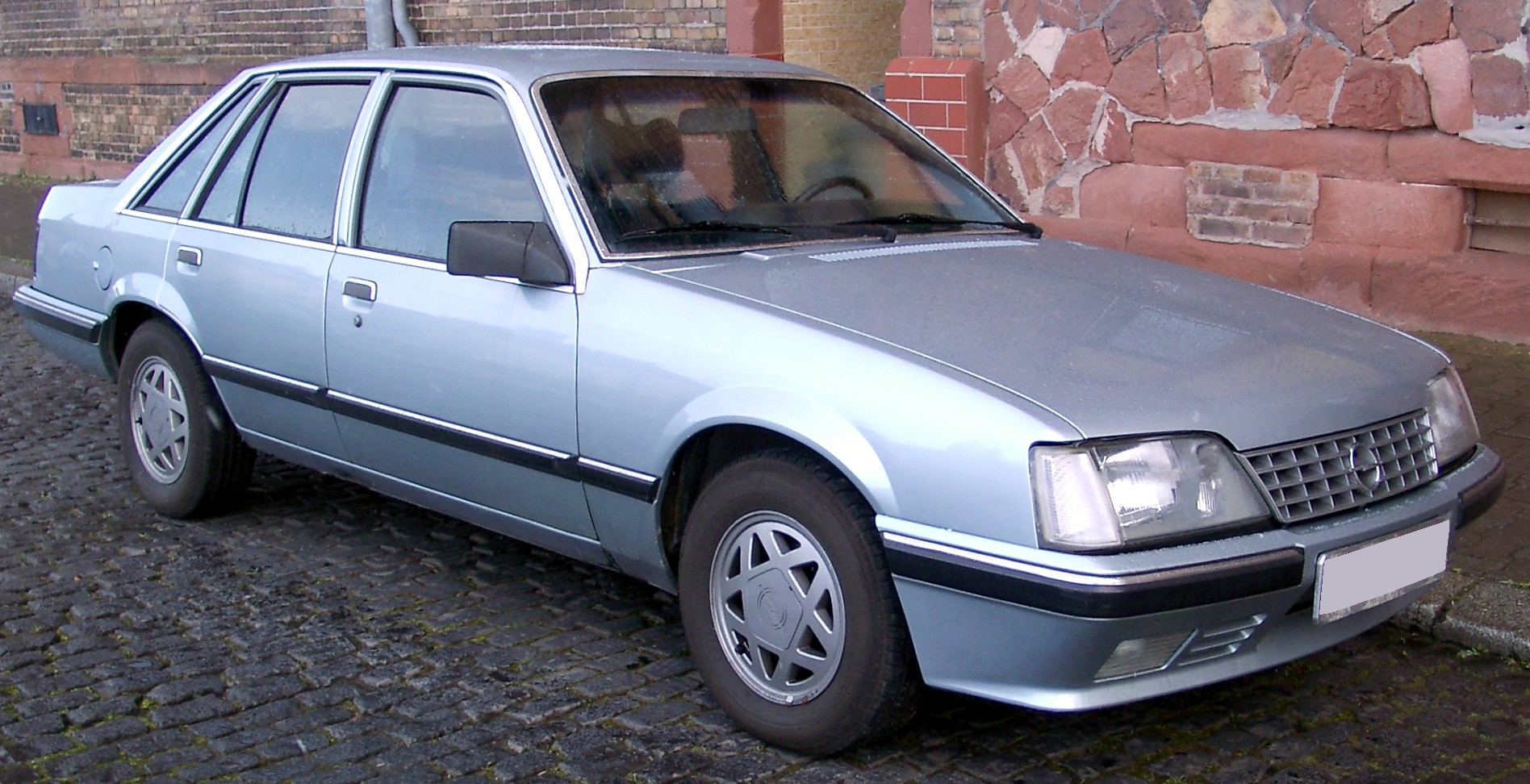
Opel Senator was produced in large scale and named Opel Kikinda.

IDA-Opel was a car manufacturer based in Kikinda which produced Opel models under license between 1977 and 1992. It produced 38,700 vehicles. The production was ended due to the start of the Yugoslav Wars and the imposition of UN economic sanctions to FR Yugoslavia.

=== Ikarbus ===
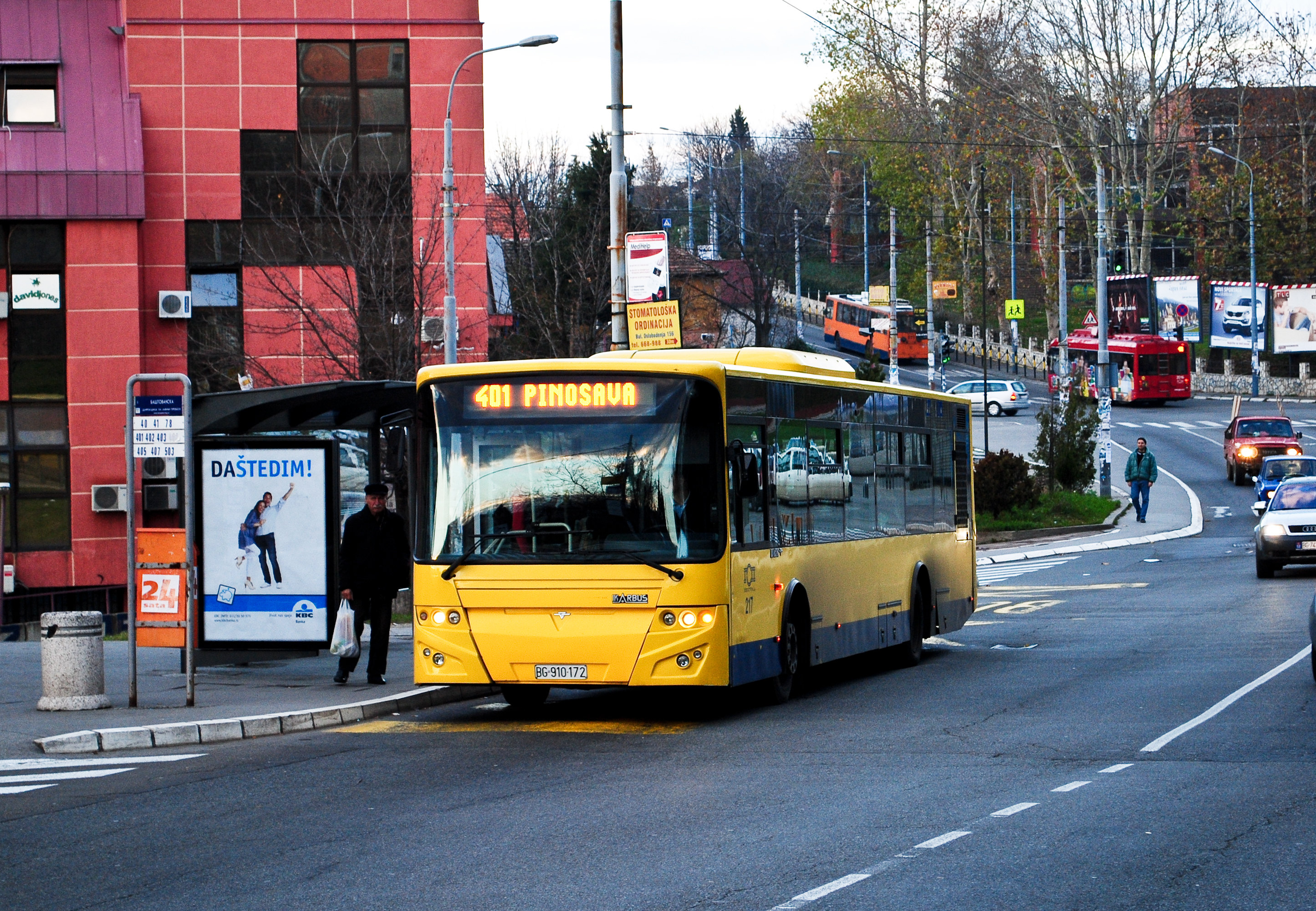
Ikarbus IK-112N

Ikarbus is a bus manufacturer based in Belgrade. The company was first founded in 1923 as "Ikarus A.D." to manufacture aircraft. After World War II the company was nationalised and two other Serbian aircraft manufacturers, Rogožarski and Zmaj aircraft, were merged into Ikarus. However, during the 1950s most of the personal and infrastructure of the aircraft factory were relocated to SOKO, and since then Ikarus has focused completely on bus production, first under licence, originally with Saurer and MAN designs, and later with the company's own. In 1992 the company was privatized, but due to a name dispute with Hungarian bus manufacturer Ikarus Bus, it changed name to Ikarbus.

=== IMK 14. oktobar ===
IMK 14. oktobar Kruševac was a company specialized in the production of heavy machinery and equipment. With its headquarters in Kruševac, it maintained production facilities in Varvarin, Brus and Ražanj. The company was established and in 1923 and declared bankruptcy in January 2016.

=== IMR ===
Industrija Motora Rakovica was a tractor manufacturer based in Rakovica, Belgrade. Founded in 1927 as Zadrugar, they closed in 2015.

=== IMT ===
Industry of Machinery and Tractors (IMT) has produced tractors and agricultural machinery since the 1950s. It went into bankruptcy procedure in 2016. In April 2018, IMT was sold to TAFE. Production is reactivated in Jarkovac, as the Belgrade factory was excluded from sale.

=== Neobus ===
Neobus was a bus manufacturer based in Novi Sad. Founded in 1952 as Autokaroserija, they cooperated closely with Slovenian manufacturer TAM. In 1992, with the independence of Slovenia, the cooperation ended and Autokaroserija became an independent bus manufacturer and changed its name to Neobus. In 2012 the Neobus went into bankruptcy.

=== Zastava Automobiles ===
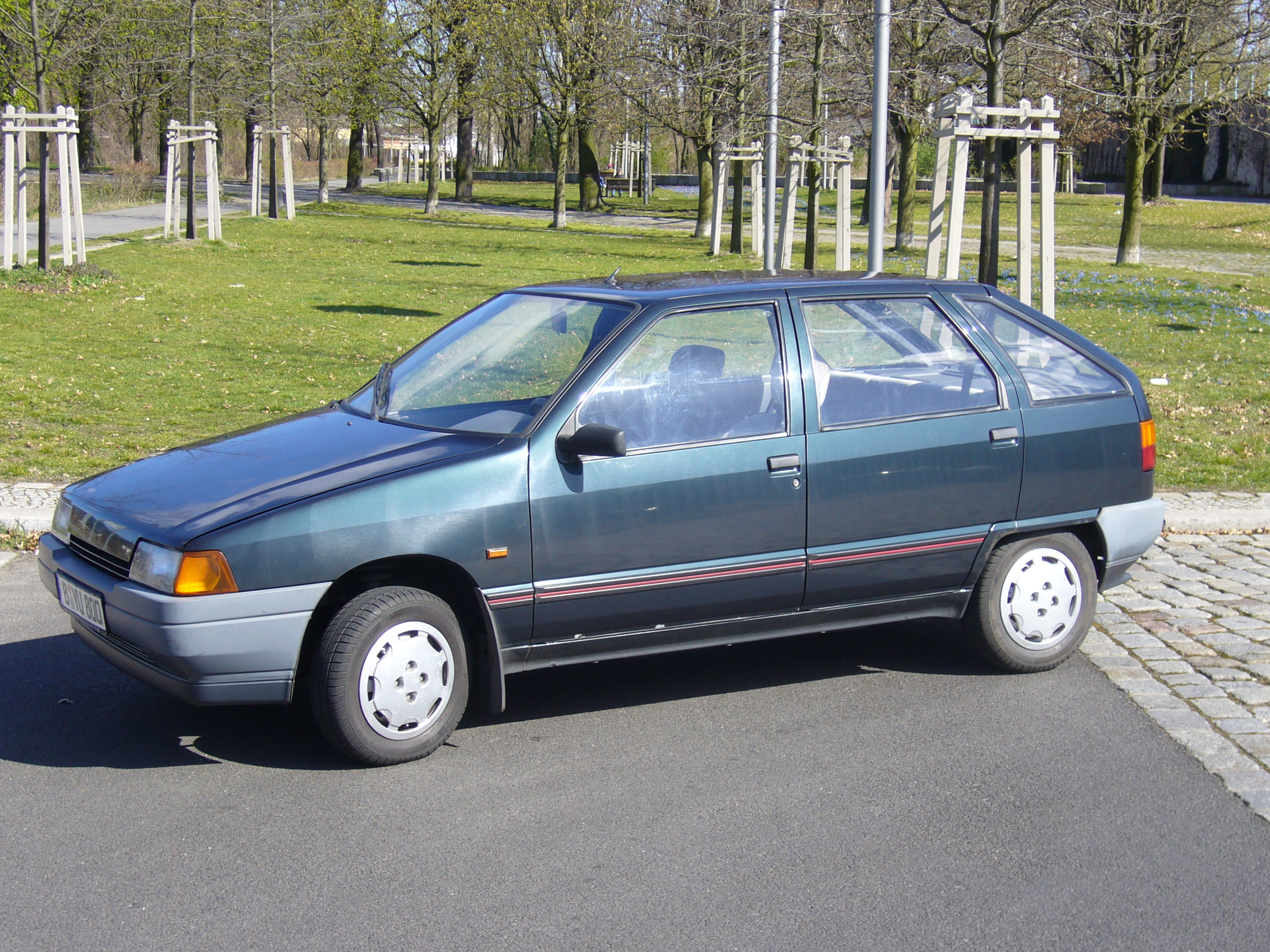
The Zastava Florida was the last model built under the Zastava brand.

Group Zastava Vehicles with its main company Zastava Automobiles, is a Serbian car manufacturer founded in Kragujevac, SFR Yugoslavia in 1953 as a successor to a Yugoslav truck manufacturer. Being part of a major industrial complex mostly dedicated to military industry, Zastava formed in 1904 what was the first section exclusively dedidacated to automobile repair and parts manufacturing. By the late 1930s it got an agreement with General Motors for assembling 4x4 military jeeps. The Second World War interrupted the collaboration and after the war it was Italian giant FIAT which signed a cooperation deal with Zastava for assembling numerous of their models. After decades of manufacturing numerous passenger and commercial vehicles under licence from Fiat, in the 1980s Zastava started producing its own models, such as Yugo and Zastava Florida designed by Giorgetto Giugiaro. They also assembled larger Fiats such as the 132 and Argenta for sale locally, as well as many Eastern European Fiat derivatives including Polski Fiat 126p, various Ladas, FSO 1500 and Polonez. The Zastava brand ended production in 2008 and in 2017 the company declared bankruptcy.

In 2008, Zastava's headquarters and assembly facilities were extensively renovated and modernized when they were assumed in a joint venture with the Republic of Serbia and Fiat, eventually becoming FCA Srbija.

=== Zastava Trucks ===
The first vehicles to be built at Zastava were 400 Chevrolet trucks, which were built under license between 1939 and 1941 for the Royal Yugoslav Army. Then in 1953, 162 off-road vehicles with the trademark Willys were produced. But the marking point was when Zastava and FIAT signed an agreement in 1955 for building cars and trucks under license, beginning with the production of Fiat AR-51 Campagnola light trucks and off-road vehicles, followed by Fiat 1100TF vans. In the 1980s Iveco models were produced.

In September 2017, the Government of Serbia established Zastava TERVO, which took over Zastava Trucks production facilities.

=== BIK ===
Bus industries Kragujevac (BIK), in collaboration with Belarusian truck and bus manufacturer MAZ, began production by the late 2000s of gas-powered buses named BIK-203 which are based on the platform of the MAZ-203 model. These buses have been delivered to several Serbian towns to be in use in public transportation companies.
