= Menell =

Menell is a surname. Notable people with the surname include:

- Brennan Menell (born 1997), American-Russian ice hockey player
- Brian Menell (born 1965), South African businessman

== See also ==
- Mennell
