= Brian Menell =

South African businessman (born 1965)

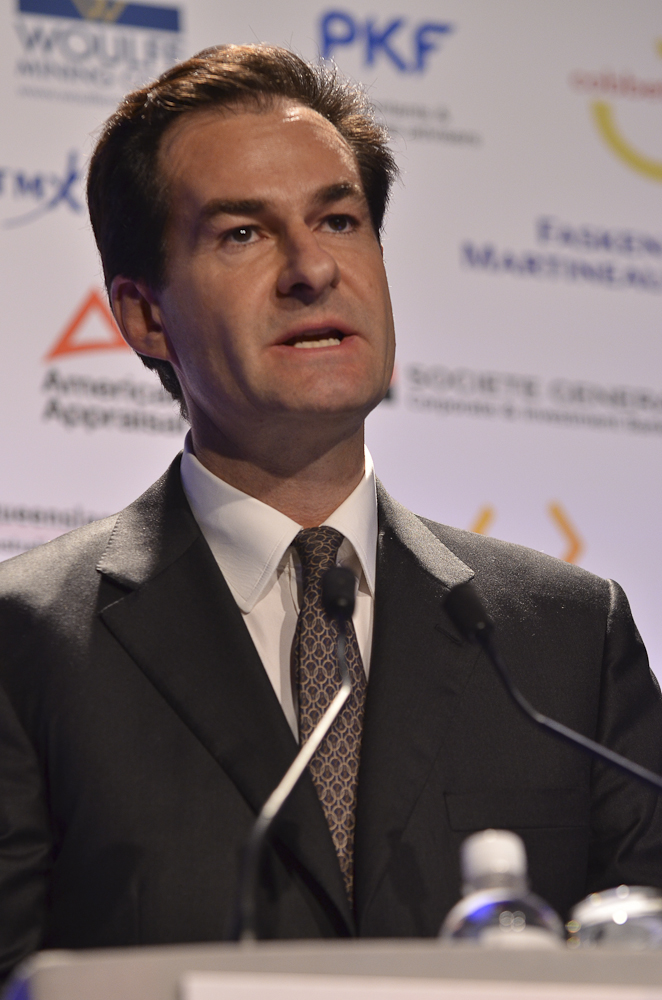
Menell in 2011

Brian Menell (born 1965) is a South African businessman with interests in mining, agriculture, and banking. He is the CEO and chairman of TechMet Ltd. London.

== Biography ==
Menell was born in 1965 in Johannesburg. His grandfather, Slip Menell, was the co-founder in 1932 of the Anglovaal Group, one of South Africa's largest diversified mining and industrial groups of companies. His father was the philanthropist and businessman, Clive Menell, who died in 1996. President Nelson Mandela gave the address at Clive's memorial service in Johannesburg.

Menell attended Rugby School in England. He holds a BA (Hons) from the University of Pennsylvania in political science and economics.

== Career ==
=== TechMet ===
Menell established TechMet, a mining and metals investment company in 2017. The firm is currently based in Dublin but also has offices in London.

The firm is partly supported by the US government's Development Finance Corporation (DFC) who have an estimated 15% stake.

TechMet primarily invests in companies engaged in the mining, processing, and recycling of minerals. Its portfolio includes operations extracting materials like lithium, nickel, and cobalt, which are pivotal components in electric vehicle batteries, as well as rare earth metals used in motors and wind turbines. The company's investment strategy focuses on either selling its stakes or pursuing initial public offerings as evidenced by previous investments like Li-Cycle, a battery recycling entity.

Notably, TechMet is the largest external shareholder in Cornish Lithium, having invested $30 million in the venture, which is formulating plans to mine lithium in the vicinity of St Austell and extract it from geothermal waters near Redruth, Cornwall. The UK Infrastructure Bank have also backed the project.

TechMet is reported to have invested in ten companies. Its interests include nickel and cobalt mining in Brazil and chemical production in Arkansas. Additionally, the firm has stakes in tin and tungsten mining operations in Rwanda.

In February 2026, Reuters reported that TechMet was seeking to raise up to $200 million in additional funding to finance critical minerals projects. According to Menell, the company had reopened fundraising after previously raising $300 million, including $180 million from the Qatar Investment Authority.

=== Mining ===
Prior to joining Anglovaal Group, Menell worked for the De Beers Group in London, Antwerp and Windhoek for eight years. He originally joined the company as a diamond sorter.

Menell was Principal and Executive Director of Anglovaal Mining Ltd. which owned precious metal, base metal, ferrous metal, and diamond interests across Southern Africa. Menell and his brother, Rick, retained control of Anglovaal until its sale in 2001 to create the largest South African empowerment controlled company, African Rainbow Minerals. During his time with Anglovaal he was also a 50% partner in the Venetia diamond mine. De Beers' acquisition of Anglovaal's interest in the mine for $600 million was the largest in the company's history.

Since the sale of Anglovaal, Menell has been a participant in different projects and businesses across sub-Saharan Africa.

In 2017, Menell founded and is chairman and CEO of TechMet Ltd, an investment vehicle for a portfolio of technology metal projects. TechMet acquires and manages projects that produce, process, and recycle the key strategic technology metals that go into batteries, electric vehicles, and robotics – cobalt, lithium, nickel, tin, tungsten, rare earth metals, vanadium, and graphite.

Menell is the chief executive officer of the Kemet Group, which invests in and manages mining and other natural resource projects across the African continent and advises certain African governments on resource policy and major transactions. He also is Chief Executive of Tinco Investments Limited (an integrated tin and tungsten producer).

Menell is a former Director and Chairman of Shore Gold Inc., one of Canada's largest diamond exploration companies.

=== Other ventures ===
In 2004, Menell was a founding partner and Executive Director of the A1 Grand Prix auto racing series. He is a Director and Chairman of Sallfort Partners AG, a private banking joint venture headquartered in Zürich.

Through the SG Menell Charitable Fund, Menell invests in disadvantaged communities in both South Africa and the rest of the developing world.

Menell has been quoted in Bloomberg and the Financial Times on technology metals, and in the Financial Times as an expert on the diamond industry, African resources, African politics, and resource nationalism. He has spoken at The Times CEO Summit, The Mines and Money Conference, and The New York Africa Forum.

== Personal life ==
He is married with two children. His wife, Emma Menell was the founding Director of Tyburn Gallery in London, England.
