= Al Fajer Group =

- Type: Private
- Industry: Holding companies
- Founded: UAE 1970
- Headquarters: Dubai
- Area served: Worldwide
- Key people: Maktoum Hasher Maktoum Al Maktoum (president and CEO); Mubarak Eisa (GM)
- Website: Official website

Al Fajer Group, based in Dubai, United Arab Emirates, is a nationally owned holding company established by Sheikh Hasher bin Maktoum Al Maktoum of Dubai's ruling family. Also known as Al Fajer Enterprises, it was established in 1970.

== Formation ==
Al Fajer Group (AFG) was established in 1970 by its Group President Sheikh Hasher Bin Maktoum Al Maktoum, His Highness. Since his appointment as CEO of the group in 1998, the company has grown to a diversified business entity delivering services to a range of international clients.

== Subsidiaries ==
AFG's business interests include a number of subsidiaries which, according to a 2008 press release, then had "more than 18,000 employees" across the "companies incorporated under its umbrella". As of October 2021, the subsidiary companies listed on the Al Fajer Group website included: Al Ahmadiah Contracting & Trading, Al Fajer Information Services, Al Fajer Trading LLC, Al Fajer Marine LLC, Al Fajer Decoration LLC, Al Fajer Facilities Management LLC, Bena Real Estate LLC Al Fajer Travel and Tourism, and Lunar Electro.

=== Former subsidiaries ===
Al Fajer Properties, L.L.C. (AFP) was established in 2004 as a wholly owned subsidiary of Al Fajer Group. The subsidiary company provided property development services in the United Arab Emirates. Based in Dubai, AFP acquired a "land bank", including within the Jumeirah Lake Towers development, and commenced construction of a number of commercial towers within the development. As of 2006 the company's interests included the Jumeirah Business Center series of commercial towers in the Jumeirah Lakes Towers free zone. In January 2009 the company was the subject of media coverage relating to claims of misleading selling practices. Later in 2009, American business magazine Forbes reported that AFP was undertaking a "restructuring of its operations" to avert "financial ruin as an independent entity". According to an October 2009 press release, Sheikh Maktoum Hasher Al Maktoum (who had taken over as CEO in 2008) was named 'CEO of the Year' in the property sector for the Mena region for the restructuring and "turnaround" of AFP. By late 2017, Al Fajer Properties was no longer included on a list of subsidiary companies on the Al Fajer Group website.
