= M1 gas mask =

Gas mask model

The M-1 (or M-59) was a standard issue gas mask for troops in Yugoslavia, as well as for SFRY successor states (Bosnia, Croatia, Macedonia, Montenegro, Slovenia, Serbia). This respirator was only available until 2005, therefore, the filters are said to have had a limited working lifetime assigned. It is a copy of the U.S. M-9 gas mask. It was also used by the Iraqi army in the Gulf War, where it was designated M-59. It is olive green in color, and has a side-loading canister which uses a 60mm opening. There are different versions of the mask, MC-1 (civilian version), M-1 (civilian version but with oral nasal cup, and some things in the bag are different) and the M-59 (the military version). The filter doesn't have asbestos, but contains chromium.

The M-1 was manufactured by Trayal.
