= International Council on Mining and Metals =

International Council on Mining and Metals (ICMM)
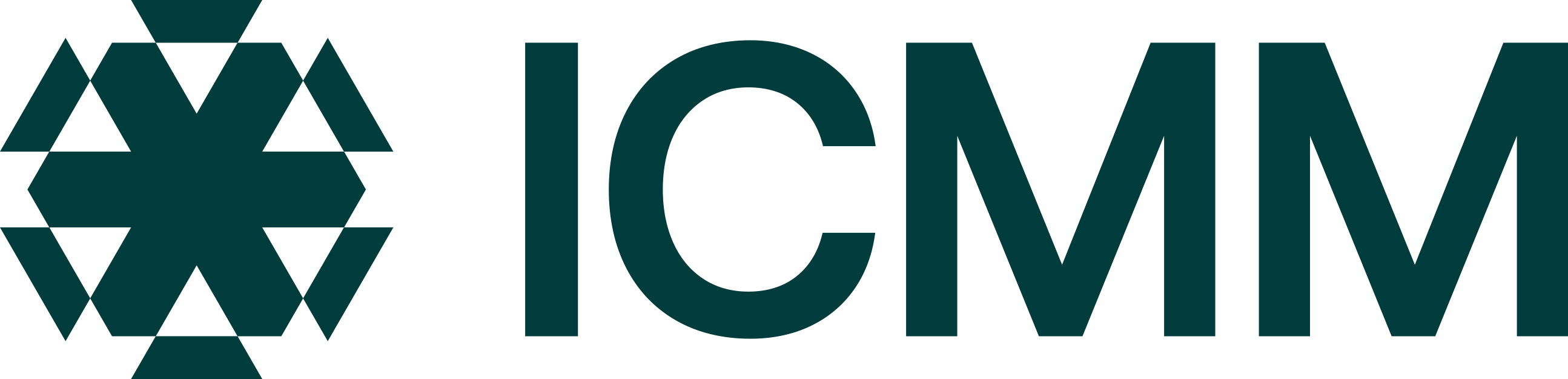
- Formation: 2001
- Type: Industry peak body
- Headquarters: London, England
- Services: Mining and Minerals peak body
- Members: See below
- Website: www.icmm.com

The International Council on Mining and Metals (ICMM) was founded in 2001, as a CEO-led leadership organization, on the premise of improving sustainable development in the mining and metals industry.

== History ==
In late 1998 a group of mining industry commissioned the International Institute for Environment and Development (IIED) research and report on sustainable development of the industry. They began the Mining, Minerals and Sustainable Development Project (MMSD) to research the topic, including consulting more than 150 separate individuals and organizations on their perspectives. The resulting document was the Toronto Declaration, presented as a plan for improving mining and metals’ contribution to sustainable development. The treaty stated that the International Council on Mining and Metals should take over responsibilities from the Mining, Minerals and Sustainable Development Project.

The International Council on Mining and Metals consists of a council composed of member company's CEOs, and committees composed of nominated representatives. Joining the International Council on Mining and Metals requires a member admission process, which is overseen by an independent third-party review panel.

In 2003, the International Council on Mining and Metals published the first iteration of its 10 Mining Principles for sustainable development. These Mining Principles were updated in 2020 to include a series of performance expectations for company members, and again in 2022 to include more specific wording on diversity, equity, and inclusion (DEI). The 10 Mining Principles are: ethical business, decision making, human rights, risk management, health & safety, environmental performance, conservation of biodiversity, responsible production, social performance, and stakeholder engagement. Beginning in 2003, the International Council on Mining and Metals also developed a number of position statements of additional commitments that members must implement.

In 2021, the International Council on Mining and Metals announced a net zero commitment. Under a policy known as ‘conform or explain’ in 2021, ICMM stated it will only adopt a common position when at least 75 percent of members are able to commit to implementation. Any company members that are unable to do so at the time have 12 months to either adopt the position or publicly explain the reasons why they cannot. The International Council on Mining and Metals developed a Strategy and Action Plan 2022–2024. Its declared priorities are: environmental resilience, social performance, governance and transparency, and innovation.

== Members ==
ICMM estimates that it brings together a third of the global metals and mining industry.

- African Rainbow Minerals
- Alcoa
- Anglo American
- AngloGold Ashanti
- Antofagasta Minerals
- Barrick
- BHP
- Boliden
- Codelco
- Freeport-McMoRan
- Glencore
- Gold Fields
- Hindustan Zinc
- Hydro
- Minera San Cristóbal
- Ma'aden
- Minsur
- MMG
- Newmont
- Orano
- Rio Tinto
- Sibanye-Stillwater
- South32
- Sumitomo Group
- Teck
- Vale

In addition to ICMM's company members, it has 45 national, commodity, and professional associations as members.
