= African Rainbow Minerals =

Mining company based in South Africa

African Rainbow Minerals Limited
- Type: Public
- Traded as: JSE: ARI
- Industry: Mining
- Founded: 2003; 23 years ago (through a merger)
- Founder: Patrice Motsepe
- Headquarters: Sandton, Johannesburg, South Africa
- Number of locations: South Africa, DRC, Zambia
- Key people: Patrice Motsepe (Non-executive Chairman) Phillip Tobias (CEO) Tsundzukani Mhlanga (CFO)
- Products: PGMs, Ferrous Metals, Coal, Copper
- Revenue: ▲ R13.02 Billion (FY 2025)
- Operating income: ▼ R1.07 Billion (FY 2025)
- Net income: ▼ R509 Million (FY 2025)
- Total assets: ▲ R74.325 Billion (FY 2025)
- Total equity: ▲ R60.121 Billion (FY 2025)
- Number of employees: 21,727 (includes contractors)
- Website: www.arm.co.za

African Rainbow Minerals Limited is a mining company based in South Africa. ARM has interests in a wide range of mines, including platinum and platinum group metals (PGMs), iron, coal, copper, and gold. ARM's Goedgevonden coalmine near Witbank is a flagship of their joint venture with Xstrata, and produces 6.7 million tons of coal per year.

ARM owns 20% of Harmony Gold, the 12th largest gold mining company in the world, with three mining operations in South Africa.

The company was founded in 2003 by Patrice Motsepe, as the result of a merger. Motsepe serves, as its Non-executive Director, having formerly served as its Chairman.

== History ==
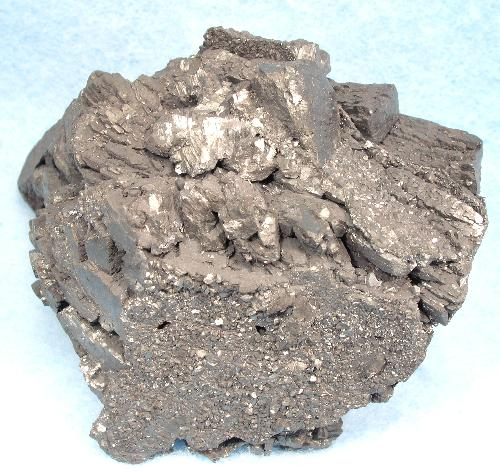
Manganite crystals from N'Chwaning

ARM was founded by Patrice Motsepe as South Africa's first black-owned mining company. Motsepe founded ARMGold in 1997, which went on to list on the Johannesburg Stock Exchange (JSE) in 2002.

In 2003 ARMGold entered a merger with Harmony Gold Mining and Anglovaal, previously owned by Richard and Brian Menell, and became the largest group controlled by black entrepreneurs. The 2003 ARMGold merger with Harmony Gold Mining formed the world’s 5th largest gold producer. The ARMGold merger with Anglovaal Mining (Avmin) came afterwards.

In 2009, ARM joined the International Council on Mining and Metals. In 2009, ARM was reported to be planning $1.12 billion investments in mining in Zimbabwe. In August 2010, ARM entered a $380 million joint venture with Vale to build a copper mine in Zambia, which was expected to produce 100,000 tons of copper.

In February 2016, ARM put a further $148 million bail out in place to preserve their broad-based black economic empowerment (B-BBEE) status. In March 2016, ARM reported that profits had been halved due to lower commodity prices. ARM also has had a 50% stake in Morobe Mining Joint Ventures (MMJV) of Papua New Guinea. MMJV has operations in Hidden Valley and Wafi-Golpu in Morobe Province approximately 50 kilometers south-west of Lae, Papua New Guinea.

In February 2026, ARM founder Patrice Motsepe stepped down as the company's Executive Chairman. The move followed the effective date of the JSE Simplification Project. According to new listing requirements, the Chair of ARM cannot also serve as an Executive Director. Motsepe confirmed he would remain as an ARM Director, and would move into a new role as its Non-executive Chairman.

== See also ==
- List of companies traded on the JSE
- List of companies of South Africa
- List of mining companies
- Economy of South Africa
