= Tigar Tyres =

Serbian tyre manufacturing company

- Native name: Tigar Gume
- Type: d.o.o.
- Industry: Manufacturing
- Founded: 1959; 67 years ago (Current form); First founded in 1935
- Headquarters: Nikole Pašića 213, Pirot, Serbia
- Area served: Worldwide
- Key people: Andre Donzallaz (Director); Carmen-Elena Petcu (Director); Roy de Lachaise Stephane Marie Bertrand (Director); Feliciano Augusto Abrantes de Almeida (Director)
- Products: Tyres
- Revenue: ▲€1.183 billion (2025)
- Net income: ▲€45.22 million (2025)
- Total assets: ▲€551.41 million (2025)
- Total equity: ▲€72.64 million (2025)
- Owner: Michelin (100%)
- Number of employees: ▼3,417 (2025)
- Website: www.tigar-tyres.com

Tigar Tyres (full legal name: Preduzećeza proizvodnju guma Tigar Tyres d.o.o. Pirot) is a Serbian tyre manufacturing company based in Pirot, Serbia. Since 2007, it is owned by the world's largest tyre manufacturer company from France - Compagnie Générale des Établissements Michelin SCA

== History ==
Tigar Tyres was founded in 1935 in Pirot, Kingdom of Yugoslavia as a workshop for the manufacture of rubber products and all kinds of footwear. It was a longtime part of joint venture company Tigar a.d. from Pirot. After World War II, the company was nationalized by new Communist authorities formed in a new Socialist Federal Republic of Yugoslavia.

In 1959, the Automotive tyre factory was founded.

In 2007, the French company Michelin became a major shareholder of the company. In February 2008, Michelin bought the remaining shares of Tigar Tyres for $47 million. With this acquisition, Michelin would become 100 percent owner of the company by 2010.

In 2012, Michelin planned to invest 170 million euros in production capacity and employ 700 more workers over 5 years. In October 2014, a new plant of the factory, worth 215 million euros, was opened. It has provided an employment for additional 500 employees. For this investment, Tigar Tyres received "Aurea" award, given by the business portal eKapija for the best investment in Serbia for 2014 calendar year.

As of April 2016, the company had around 3,000 employees. From 2013 to 2016, Tigar Tyres has invested 215 million euros in factory's modernization and construction of new facilities.

== Market and financial data ==
In 2013, Tigar Tyres was the fourth biggest Serbian gross exporter (not counting imports by the company) with the total value of exported goods worth 231.4 million euros. Since then, Tigar Tyres has established itself as one of three biggest Serbian gross exporters, being the third biggest exporter in 2014 (233 million euros of exports), 2015 (291 million euros) and 2016 (315.7 million euros).

According to the 2018 financial report submitted to the Serbian Economic Registry Agency, the company has 3,388 employees and it posted an annual profit of €40.86 million for the 2018 calendar year. Tigar Tyres finished the 2018 calendar year as the fourth biggest Serbian gross exporter with 388.9 million euros worth of exports.

== Incidents ==
On 23 April 2015, six employees were injured by electric shock in the factory plant, of whom three had serious injuries. All three had burns that were covering between 50 and 80 percent of the body. In the next 10 days after the accident, all three workers who were seriously injured died of injuries sustained due to the electric shock.

At the beginning of 2022, residents of Pirot and the surrounding area came out against the Tigar plant. They filed a complaint with the Institute of Public Health, in which they pointed out the strong noise and vibrations coming from the factory and making it difficult to fall asleep. It seemed as if a centrifuge was working or an airplane was flying in a circle. Citizens referred to the law on protection from noise in the environment. According to the law, manufacturing facilities are required to control noise and contribute to noise protection costs. The inspectors visited the Tigar plant with an extraordinary inspection. A month passed after the check, but the problem remained. People noted that unpleasant noises and vibrations faded somewhat, but they are still felt every day. People demanded more decisive action from the authorities, and from the plant to replace the lattice fence with soundproof panels.

== See also ==
- Automotive industry in Serbia
