= Yura Corporation =

Serbian manufacturing company

- Native name: Јура Корпорација
- Company type: d.o.o.
- Industry: Manufacturing
- Founded: 18 March 2010; 16 years ago
- Headquarters: Kralja Petra I, Rača, Serbia
- Area served: Worldwide
- Key people: Seung Woo Yu (Director)
- Products: Power, instrumentation and telecommunications cables, cable harnesses
- Revenue: ▲€178.29 million (2018)
- Net income: ▼€2.53 million (2018)
- Total assets: ▲€170.48 million (2018)
- Total equity: ▼€63.48 million (2018)
- Owner: Yura Corporation South Korea
- Number of employees: 6,081 (2018)

Yura Corporation (Serbian: Јура Корпорација) is a Serbian cable and harnessing manufacturing company headquartered in Rača, Serbia. It is owned by the South Korean manufacturing company Yura Corporation.

== History ==
Yura Corporation d.o.o. was established on 18 March 2010, with the headquarters in Rača, Serbia. The company was established through Government of Serbia subsidies to the South Korean cable manufacturing company Yura Corporation, which is the cooperator of the largest South Korean automobile manufacturers Kia Motors and Hyundai Motors.

In April 2010, Yura Corporation bought the insolvent Serbian manufacturing company "Zastava Elektro" based in Rača, for a sum of 3 million euros. Later, it renovated its facilities and renewed production.

In June 2011, Yura Corporation opened in the city of Niš its second facility in Serbia, employing additional 1,500 people. In November 2011, Yura Corporation subsidiary company "Yura Shinwon" opened its facility in Niš, employing 500 people.

In 2012, Yura Corporation opened its fourth facility in Leskovac. As of November 2012, Yura Corporation employed around 5,500 employees in Serbia.

In September 2015, the mayor of Leskovac confirmed that Yura Corporation is building yet another facility in Leskovac, its fifth facility in Serbia. When finished by the end of 2018, it would employ additional 3,000 people.

In February 2018, Yura Corporation announced that it is building another facility in Leskovac, worth 40 million euros.

== Market and financial data ==
Over the years, Yura Corporation emerged as one of the top Serbian net exporters. For 2014, it was third largest net exporter of Serbia with 119 million euros worth of exports.

== Labor controversies ==
Since Yura Corporation was established in Serbia in 2010 through Government's subsidies, there were constant media reports about the inhumane working conditions for its employees. According to these reports, employees are forced to work in harsh conditions and to be silent about the violations of labor laws, due to high unemployment rates in the country and threats by the investors to leave the country if complaints and eventual syndicate strikes continue to disrupt company's reputation. Among the violations are: mobbing, insulting, cursing and even physical attacks such as slapping and other forms of harassment.

In 2015, there were even reports that the workers are not allowed to use the toilets due to decreased production productivity, and that instead they are using diapers.

== See also ==
- Automotive industry in Serbia
