= A1 Grand Prix =

Motor racing series, 2005–2009

- Category: Single seaters
- Country: International
- Inaugural season: 2005–06
- Folded: 2009
- Drivers: 35
- Teams: 21
- Chassis suppliers: Lola (2005–08); Ferrari (2008–09)
- Engine suppliers: Zytek (2005–08); Ferrari (2008–09)
- Last Teams' champion: (Republic of Ireland) A1 Team Ireland (2008–09)

A1 Grand Prix Operations Ltd. operated as A1 Grand Prix (A1GP) was a "single-make" open-wheel auto racing series that ran from 2005 until 2009. It was unique in its field in that competitors solely represented their nation as opposed to themselves or a team, the usual format in most formula racing series. As such, it was often promoted as the "World Cup of Motorsport". The series was ratified by the Fédération Internationale de l'Automobile (FIA), and races were held in the traditional Formula One off-season, the northern hemisphere winter. The nation-based A1GP concept was founded by Sheikh Maktoum Hasher Maktoum Al Maktoum of Dubai, initially in 2003. After a successful first season of A1GP, Maktoum sold his position as chairman and director of A1GP to RAB Capital in December 2006. Tony Teixeira took control of the series, and the series later liquidated after failing to host any races during the 2009–10 season.

== History ==
The nation-based A1GP concept was founded by Sheikh Maktoum Hasher Maktoum Al Maktoum of Dubai, initially in 2003. Once the series had received the backing of the FIA, a management structure including new executive directors Brian Menell and Tony Teixeira were appointed to oversee the sale of franchises for the operation of international teams. Thirty franchises were made available; twenty-three of them were restricted to specified nations, while the other seven were opened to tender for nations that had not been initially targeted.

=== First season ===
Twenty-five of the franchises were purchased in time for the 2005–06 A1 Grand Prix season, which began on 25 September 2005 with the A1 Grand Prix of Nations Great Britain at the Brands Hatch circuit in Kent, United Kingdom. The first season was planned for 12 rounds (24 races, with two each weekend); however the cancellation of a race scheduled for Curitiba, Brazil in January 2006 reduced this number to 11. Nelson Piquet Jr. won the inaugural race of the series for A1 Team Brazil. Their winning form was not to continue. Wins at Estoril and Malaysia saw A1 Team France build up a sizeable gap. By the start of the winter break, France had run away with the lead with A1 Team Switzerland 28 points behind. At the final race of the season in Shanghai, A1 Team France were crowned the first-ever A1 Grand Prix world champions with 172 points. Switzerland were second with 121 points and A1 Team Great Britain third with 97 points.

Katherine Legge was the first woman to drive A1 Grand Prix cars during test session in December 2005 on Dubai Autodrome.

=== Second season ===
Changes were made for the 2006–07 season to race durations and distances to improve the spectacle for attendees and TV viewers. The 2006–07 schedule was released on 7 July 2006, with the first race at Circuit Park Zandvoort on 1 October 2006, and the last race at Brands Hatch on 29 April 2007. New teams Team Singapore and Team Greece joined the competition but Team Turkey failed to secure funding for the season. Team Austria, Team Japan, Team Portugal and Team Russia did not return for the second season. However, after securing funding Team Portugal competed in the final four rounds of the second season in South Africa, Mexico, China and Britain. Team Germany won the series with 128 points, 35 points lead ahead of Team New Zealand.

On 29 September, Sheikh Maktoum announced he was resigning his position as chairman and chief executive of the series, seeking to have his place taken by increased shareholder interests:

I am happy that I have built the series with fans in mind. I feel like I have fulfilled my promise to them by bringing A1GP from concept to reality and am confident that the World Cup of Motorsport will go from strength to strength. Having devoted all my efforts to making A1GP the success it is today, this transaction will allow me to devote more time to my Dubai International Holding Company which currently manages a substantial portfolio of assets and new ventures and which continues to actively pursue other significant investment opportunities.

Maktoum announced his intended resignation in September and his exit from the organisation was confirmed in December.

=== Third season ===
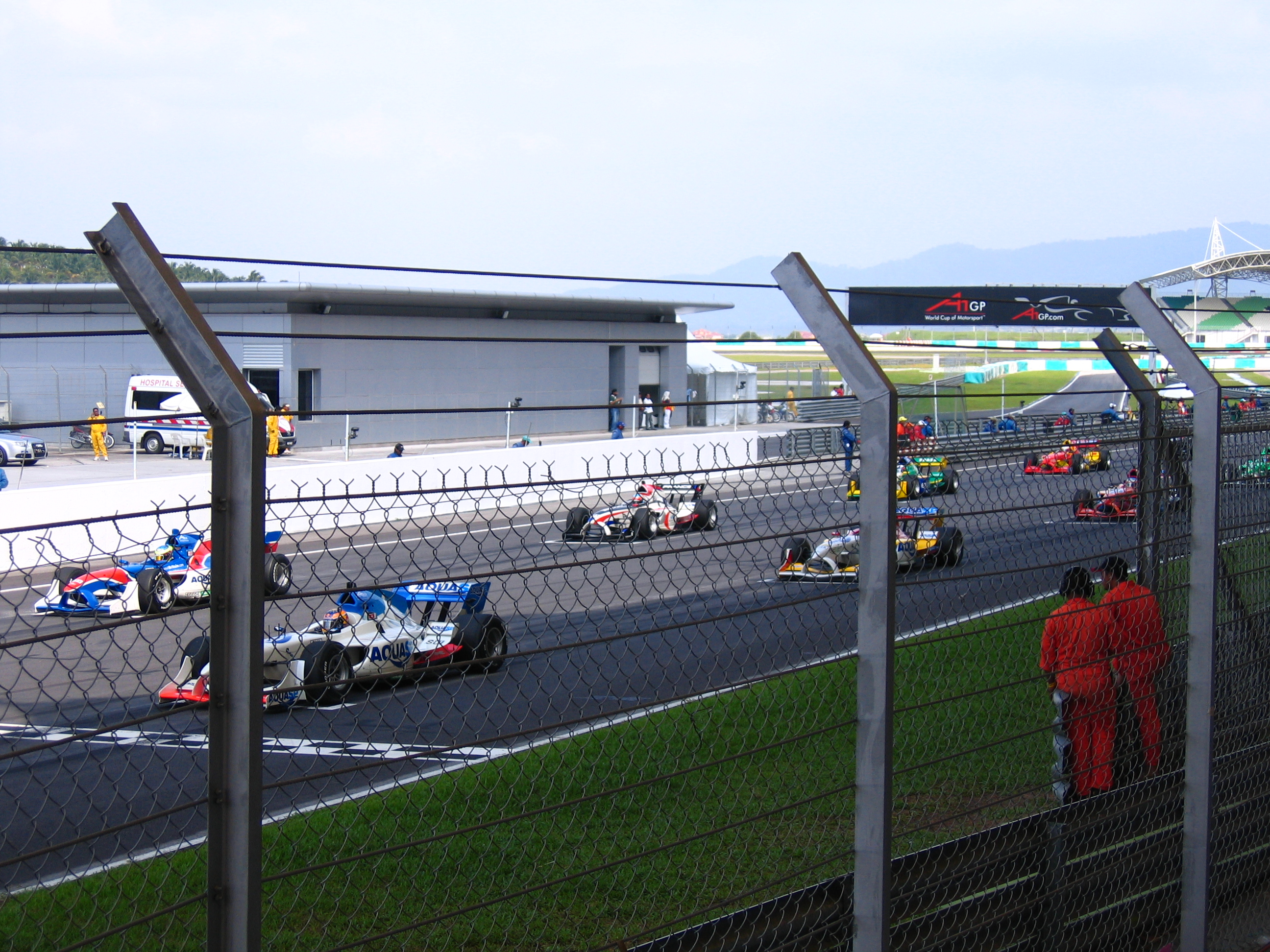
Sepang International Circuit A1 Race

The 2007–08 season was the final season that used the Lola-Zytek A1GP car, with rule changes including two mandatory pit-stops in the Feature Race and an introduction of E30 biofuel as the cars' fuel. Team Switzerland was the winning team with Neel Jani behind the wheel.

=== Fourth season ===
In what proved to be the series' final season, the 2008–09 season was the only season in which the "Powered by Ferrari" A1GP car was used. According to 2007–08 champion Neel Jani, 90% of teams in the paddock warned Teixeira ahead of time that this car change was untimely and an inefficient use of funds. Rule changes included shorter qualifying sessions, a pit-stop during the now longer Sprint Race, removal of limits on Friday test drivers, and reduced Sprint Race points scoring. Throughout the season, three rounds (in Italy, Indonesia, and Mexico) were cancelled for various reasons, and a proposed race in Brazil fell through. Team Ireland won the series with Ulsterman Adam Carroll.

=== Fifth season (cancelled) ===
The opening round of the season, scheduled as part of the already well established Nikon SuperGP race meeting, was cancelled five days before practice was due to begin. With cars and series infrastructure still tied up in London and no comment forthcoming from A1GP, organisers in Australia were forced to announce the series would not appear at what had been a high-profile addition to the A1 Grand Prix calendar. The event was underwritten by the Queensland state government, who mentioned the possibility of taking legal recourse against A1 Grand Prix.

The series was thrown into further doubt as more races were cancelled, with an announcement made on 5 November 2009 stating that the races in China and Malaysia would not be taking place. The last race that was to be held in the season, the Dutch round, was switched for Superleague Formula. This put an end to the hopes the season would start and also put the future of the series in doubt.

=== Series collapse and liquidation ===
Chairman Tony Teixeira announced in October 2007 that Italian manufacturer Ferrari would design and build the engines for six years, and that Ferrari would consult in the design and manufacture of the car. The Ferrari involvement was intended to ease some of the concerns regarding A1GP's ongoing financial viability, the continued input of existing backers, and the platform's ability to attract sponsors. CEO Pete da Silva reported a loss for the initial season, and yet RAB Capital paid $200 million to the exiting Dubai founder for his 80% stake. Before the 2008–09 "Powered by Ferrari" season was to begin, Bloomberg reported that RAB Capital announced that the A1GP investment had been written down for a third time. A1 Team Australia boss Alan Jones later suggested that "it is common knowledge that Mr Teixeira bought RAB Capital out from A1GP" before the current season, yet A1GP prominently displayed RAB Capital branding until A1GP discontinued racing operations in 2009.

Following doubts that the fifth season would go ahead due to financial constraints and reports that engine suppliers Ferrari would pull out over non-payments, Teixeira announced that the series had secured its long-term future, following a financial restructuring. As part of the restructuring, administration had been applied for the previously liquidated A1 Grand Prix Operations Ltd.

A dispute over the ownership of the series' cars was heard on 18 January 2010 at the High Court of Justice in London, with a judicial decision on 21 January 2010 ruling that the Administrator, Tim Bramston, had won the case with A1 Holdings. The assets were awarded to A1 Grand Prix Operations, and therefore Bramston became their administrator. Bramston said he was trying to secure the best price in liquidation and would not rule out a sale to an entity controlled by Teixeira.

RAB Capital's Special Situations fund missed out on the market recovery of 2009 and its shareholders forced manager RAB to allow the entire fund to be put up for sale through a Dutch auction.

While the A1GP liquidators were apparently selling all intellectual property rights along with cars, it is unclear if a buyer was also expected to assume franchise agreements and financial obligations, or if the series and its necessary operating entities could be bought free and clear of any and all claims by Teixeira, Lyndhurst, and RAB. The liquidators appointed GoIndustry DoveBid to handle the sale of the assets, and the liquidators are seeking £10 million for the assets.

If a revival plan for the series could not be agreed with interested investment parties then the A1 Grand Prix assets were to be put up for auction.

=== Rumoured revivals ===
On 5 July 2010 Autosport magazine published in its "rumours & speculation" blog that the series, in one form or another, was to be revived for a new 2011–12 season, citing an unidentified source who claims backing from a group of new investors. The season would constitute 18 countries making up the grid and ten race weekends, spread out either side of Christmas 2011, visiting many of the series' previous venues. The series would also run under a new model, similar to the GP2 Series whereby teams are responsible for finding their own funding.

In 2011 rumours surfaced of A1GP's potential return with a new name. The series was to be called the A10 World Series, keeping the A1 from A1GP to signify the continuation of the idea. The series was billed as a Global single seater series with 600BHP V10 engines. A source told Autosport magazine that the A10 World Series would use A1GP's idea of pitting countries against each other. However, the holding company for the series was formally dissolved in early 2012.

In 2014 ISRA (International Sport Racing Association) took 2005–08 A1 Grand Prix racing cars (Lola-Zytek) and created a single-seater competition named Formula Acceleration 1, which was part of Acceleration 2014.

In May 2015 AFRIX Motorsport of South Africa announced that they had purchased the remaining 21 'Powered by Ferrari' A1GP cars – together with their engines and spares, but less engine management electronics and steering wheels – from Delivered on Time, a freight company that had been granted a lien on the vehicles in lieu of unpaid bills. AFRIX stated that the cars were to form the basis for a one-make series to be run in South Africa during the southern hemisphere summer.

Announced in May 2023, A1GP was planned to make a return with a 100 million dollar funding.

=== Champions ===
Season	Team	Poles	Wins	Podiums	Fastest laps	Points	Clinched	Margin	Ref
2005–06	France	4	13	15	9	172	Race 19 of 22	51	
2006–07	Germany	3	9	14	5	128	Race 20 of 22	35	
2007–08	Switzerland	6	4	11	5	168	Race 19 of 20	41	
2008–09	(Republic of Ireland) Ireland	6	5	8	5	112	Race 14 of 14	17	

== Teams ==
Each A1 Grand Prix team represented a nation. Drivers must have the same nationality as the team they drove for. The team car should also represent the country. The team owner, principal and crew, however, did not need to have the same nationality as the team.

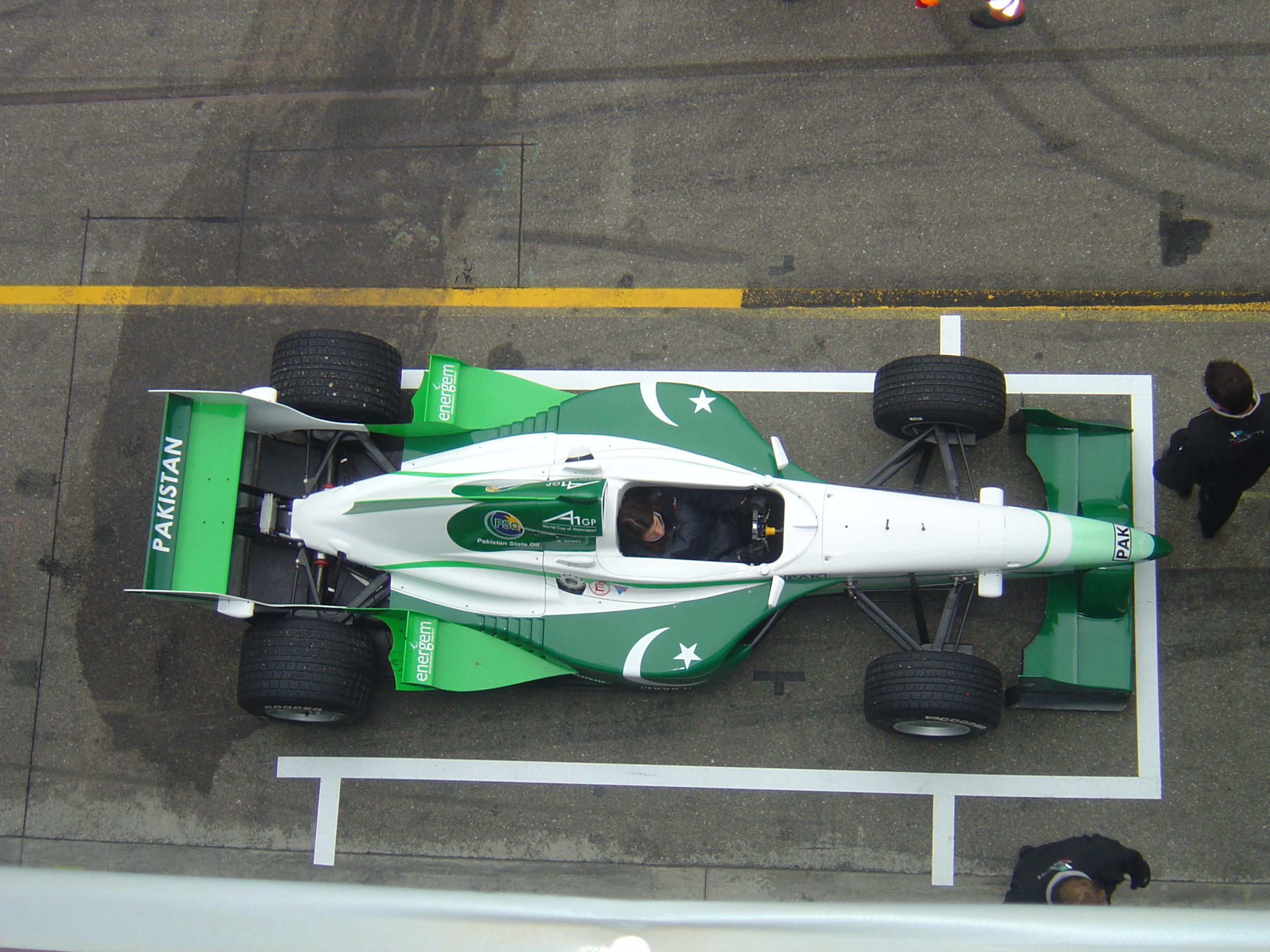
A1 Team Pakistan and their seat holder Adam Khan during a pit stop.

Twenty-nine nations started one race in A1GP – as in the table below:

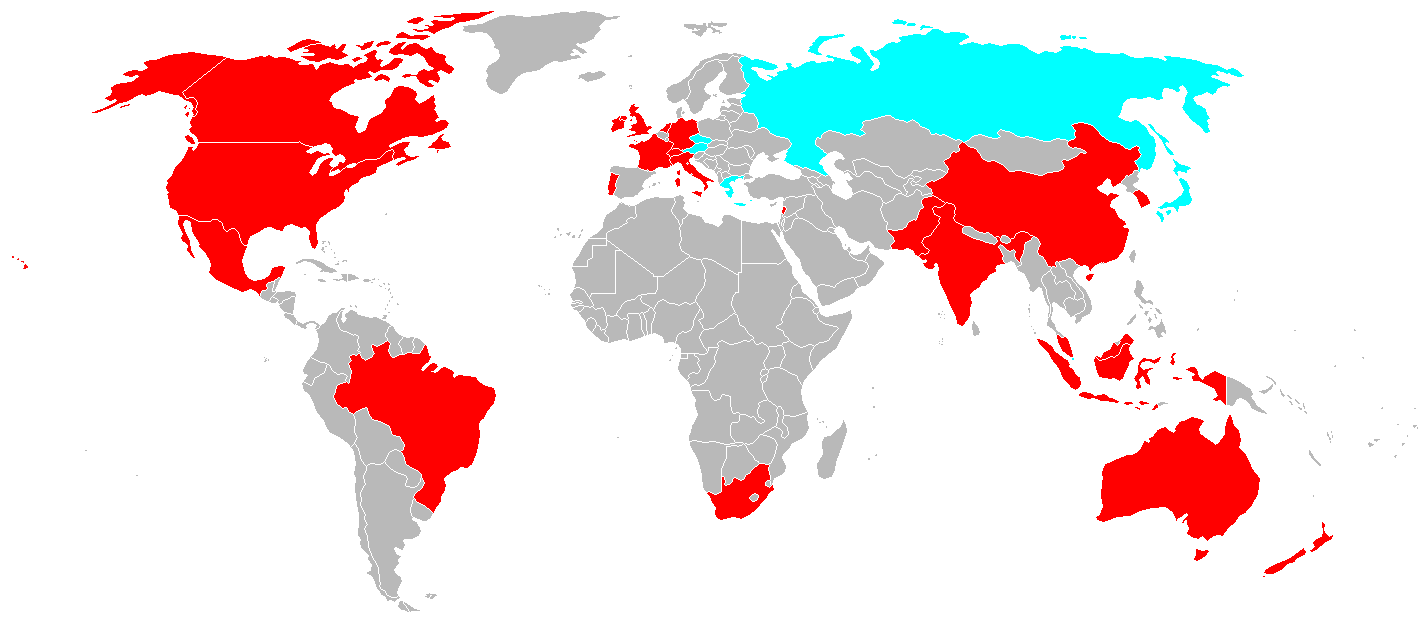
A world map showing the distribution of A1 GP teams in the last season (red) and who also took part in one or more of the earlier seasons (blue)

Participating countries
Africa	Americas	Asia	Europe	Oceania
South Africa	Brazil; Canada; Mexico (United States) USA	China; India; Indonesia; Japan (South Korea) Korea; Lebanon; Malaysia; Pakistan; Singapore	Austria; Czech Republic; France; Germany (United Kingdom) Great Britain; Greece (Republic of Ireland) Ireland; Italy; Monaco; Netherlands; Portugal; Russia; Switzerland	Australia; New Zealand

== Drivers ==
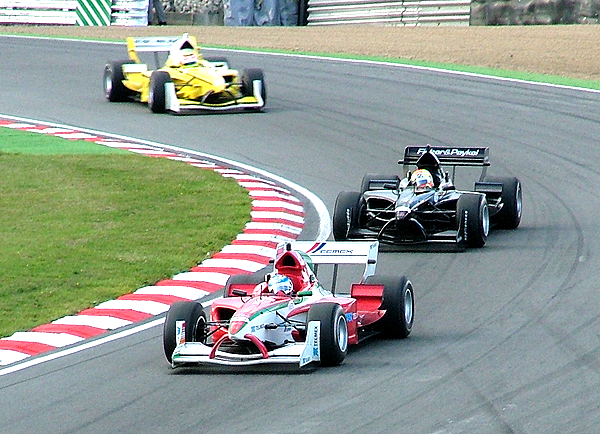
Mexico, New Zealand and Malaysia competing during the first-ever race weekend at Brands Hatch

== Race weekend ==
A1 Grands Prix of Nations took place over a three-day period, from Friday to Sunday. The teams were given five sets of dry weather slick tires, and two sets of wet weather treaded tires per weekend. However, if the weather was extreme, the team could be given more wet weather tires at the expense of the slick tires. The race weekend started with two one-hour practice sessions held on the Friday, and then another on the Saturday morning. A two-hour qualifying session took place on Saturday afternoon, and two races took place on Sunday. Primarily, the three practice sessions were for car setup and track familiarisation before the official competition began with Saturday qualifying. Three different drivers could participate in the three practice sessions; the driver elected for qualifying or for one of the races was required to have taken part in at least one such practice session.

=== Qualifying ===
A1 Grand Prix used a unique qualifying format, which began at 14:00 local time on the Saturday of the race weekend, to determine the grid lineup for Sunday's races, the Sprint Race and the Main Race. The qualifying period was split into four, ten-minute sessions. Each car was permitted three laps per session, including the laps required for leaving the pits, and for re-entering it. This allowed one lap to set a competitive time. There was a five-minute break between sessions, which added up to a total of 55 minutes for qualifying. The grid for the Sprint Race was set based on the cars' fastest time from either the first or the second session. The grid for the Feature Race was determined the same way, but using sessions three and four. However, if there was a red flag due to an accident on the circuit, the timing to the end of qualifying continued to run.

=== Sprint race ===
The Sprint Race used the grid determined in sessions one and two of the previous day's qualifying session, and was held in the early afternoon. The race began from a rolling start, and its duration was a maximum of 24 minutes plus one additional lap. Additionally, each team had to make one mandatory pit stop between laps four and eight. Drivers were permitted four uses of PowerBoost during the Sprint Race.

Points and prize money for 2008–09
Pos.	Points		Prize	
Pos.	Sprint	Feature	Sprint	Feature
1	10	15	$100,000	$200,000
2	8	12	$70,000	$130,000
3	6	10	$50,000	$100,000
4	5	8	$35,000	$75,000
5	4	6	$30,000	$50,000
6	3	5	$20,000	$40,000
7	2	4	$15,000	$25,000
8	1	3	$10,000	$20,000
9		2	$7,000	$13,000
10		1	$3,000	$7,000
Fast lap	1	1		
Only the best 9 race weekends count

=== Feature race ===
The Feature Race used the grid determined in sessions three and four of the previous day's qualifying session, and was held mid-afternoon. The race began from a standing start, and was a race of approximately 180 kilometres (110 mi), with a maximum time limit of 69 minutes plus one lap. Teams had to make two mandatory pit stops during the Feature Race, one between laps eight and sixteen, and another during a pit window, which was not announced until the first window has closed. Drivers were permitted eight uses of PowerBoost during the Feature Race.

==== Pit stop ====
Each team had to complete three compulsory pit stops over the course of the race weekend – one during the Sprint Race, and two during the Feature Race. During the pit stop, all four tyres on the car had to be changed. A total of eight mechanics could be used during the stop, however, only four were allowed to 'touch the car', none of which (save the so-called "lollipop man" that directed the car into its pit) could be present in the pit lane before the car came to a complete halt. Refuelling was also not permitted; infringements of these rules or of the pit-lane speed limit resulted in the imposition of a drive-through penalty.

At the end of Season 3, A1GP released the results of the season's pit stop times. Although having never won a race, A1 Team Australia had the fastest pit crew of all teams.

=== Scoring ===
Unlike almost all other forms of auto racing, drivers did not score points individually; instead the points they earn were ascribed to their national team. This means that teams could change drivers between rounds, which was often necessary because some drivers had commitments in other formulae, and still accumulate points to their score.

Points were awarded for the first ten places but the amounts changed during the series' run: 15 for the winner, 12 for second place, 10 for third place, 8 for fourth place, 6 for fifth place, 5 for sixth place, and so on with 4, 3, 2, and one point for tenth place. Points were awarded in a different way for the Sprint Race: 10 for the winner, counting down 8, 6, 5, 4, 3, 2, and 1 point for eighth place. In addition, one point was awarded to the team that set the fastest single lap time in either the Sprint or Main Race. Cash prizes were also awarded.

Below is a list of pointscoring systems used to determine the winner of the A1 Grand Prix World Cup of Motorsport since the 2005–06 season. The World Cup of Motorsport was awarded to the A1 Grand Prix team which accumulated the most points over the course of a season.

Seasons	Race	1st	2nd	3rd	4th	5th	6th	7th	8th	9th	10th	Fastest Lap	Notes
2005–06	All	10	9	8	7	6	5	4	3	2	1	1	
2006–07	Sprint	6	5	4	3	2	1					1	
2006–07	Feature	10	9	8	7	6	5	4	3	2	1	1	
2007–08	All	15	12	10	8	6	5	4	3	2	1	1	
2008–09	Sprint	10	8	6	5	4	3	2	1			1	Result of each team's worst race weekend will be dropped
2008–09	Feature	15	12	10	8	6	5	4	3	2	1	1	Result of each team's worst race weekend will be dropped

== Chassis and engines ==
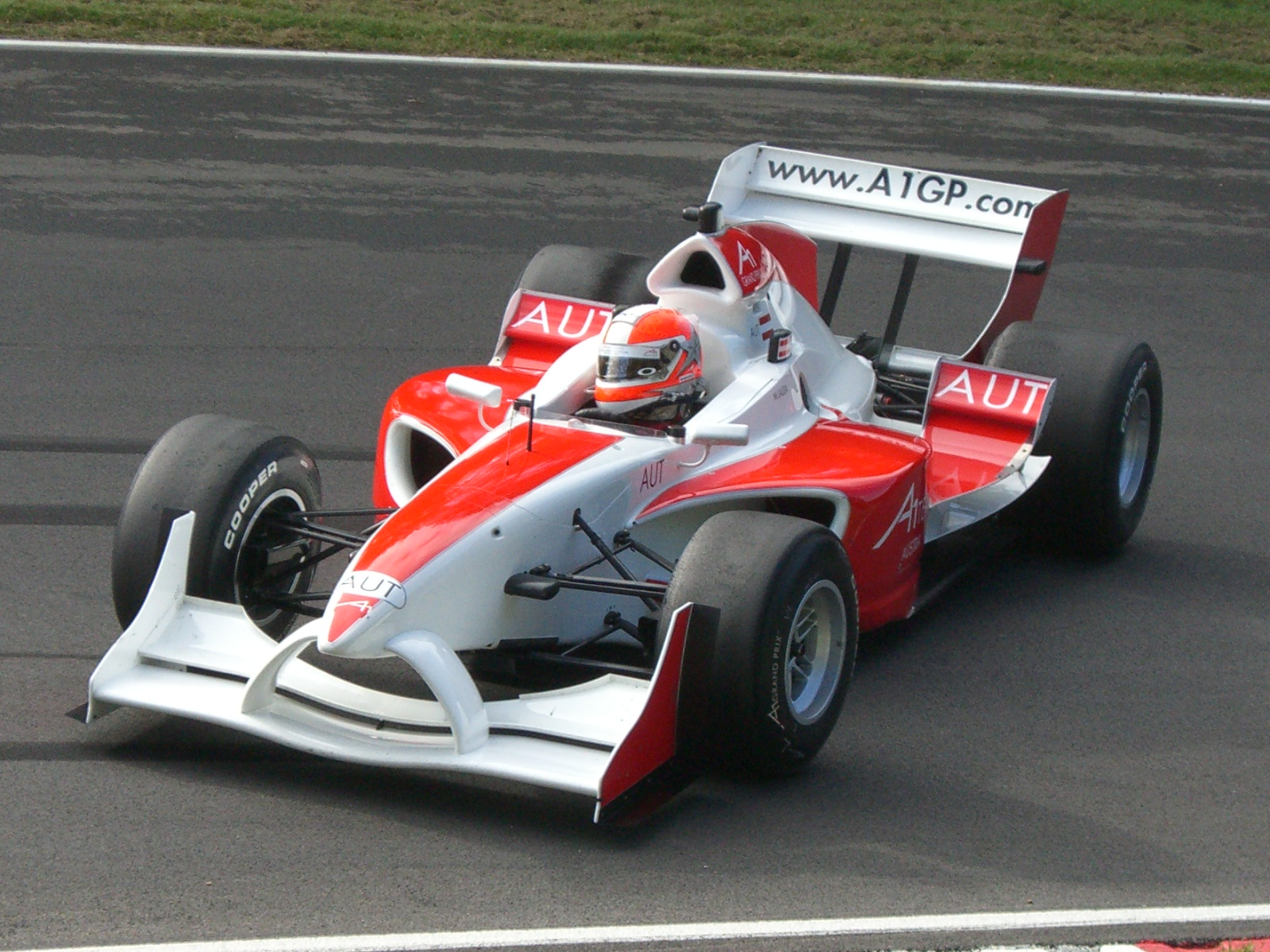

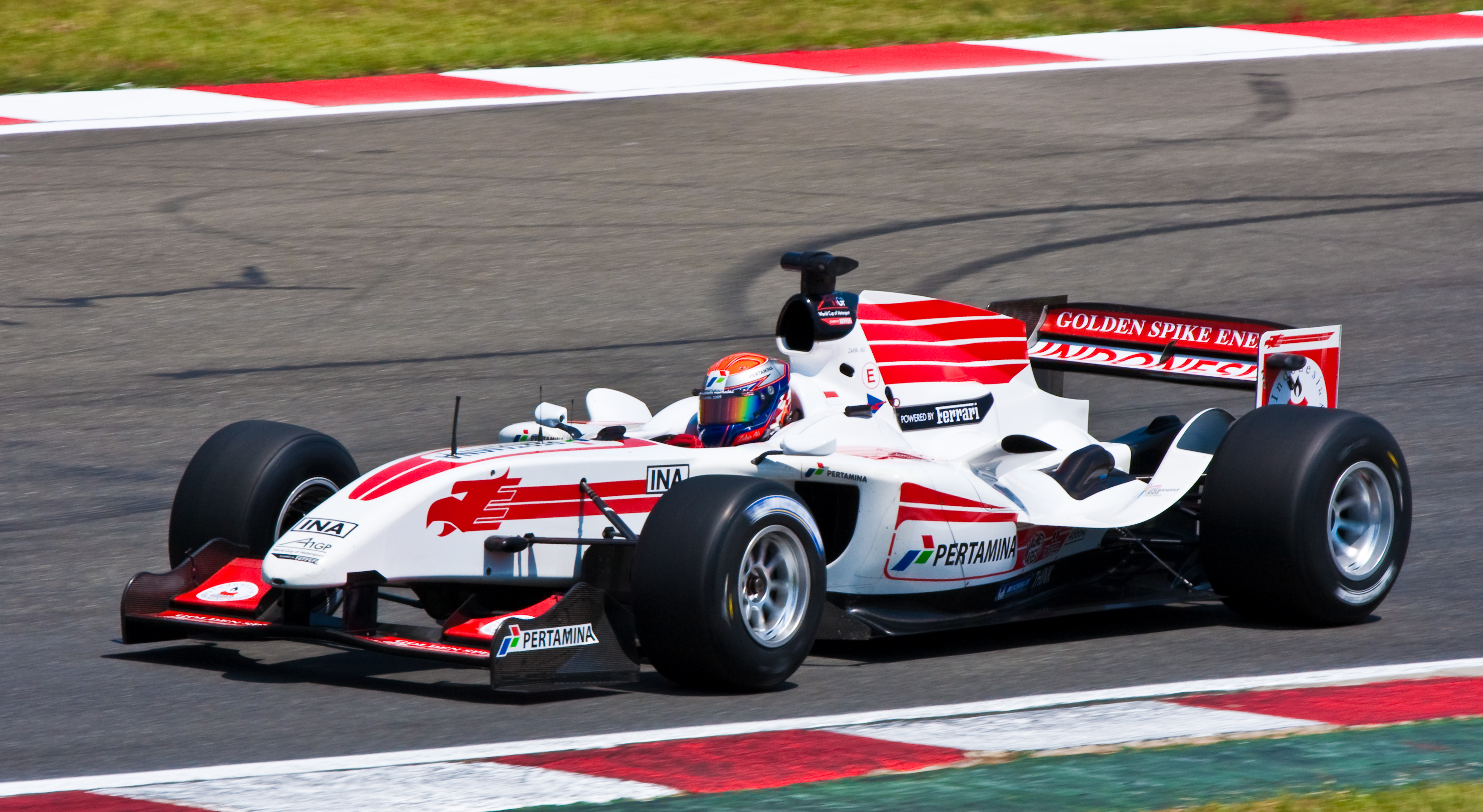
The original Lola A1GP car (above) compared to the "Powered by Ferrari" chassis (below).

The A1GP formula provided a single "spec" car for each team. Each car was mechanically identical, built with many technical restrictions designed to limit performance, reduce running costs, and prevent any one or number of teams gaining an advantage through better equipment.

=== First generation ===
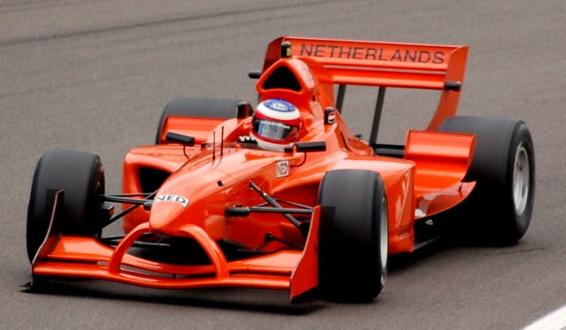

The Lola A1GP, chassis Lola B05/52, was used in the first three seasons. These chassis were fitted with 3.4-litre Zytek engines delivering up to 550 brake horsepower (410 kW) in PowerBoost mode, and ran on Cooper tyres. The car was standardised for every team to provide a level playing field for competing nations. It was designed to reduce the volume of "dirty air", allowing drivers to close in on the car in front, encouraging overtaking. The bodywork was mainly pre-impregnated carbon fibre composites. From 2008–09 Ferrari was consulted on the design and manufacture for all A1 Grand Prix cars. From the 2008–2009 season the Lola A1GP car was replaced by the A1GP Powered by Ferrari car.

The Lola A1GP was the spec car used by the series from the 2005–06 season to the 2007–08 season. It was powered by Zytek engines, and ran on Cooper tyres. The former chassis was then used in the Euroseries 3000 (or Auto GP) started in 2009. The chassis, designated Lola A1GP is made and designed by Lola Cars. The A1 Car's carbon fibre skin cloaks a core of aluminium honeycomb. Based on bionic engineering principles found in nature, the hexagonal honeycomb provides remarkable strength for its weight, and has progressive deformation properties in response to an impact, which contributes to driver safety. In addition, drivers are protected by FIA-approved side intrusion panels that protect them from lateral impacts.

The engine for the cars was developed by Zytek Engineering. The 3.4-litre V8 unit is capable of delivering 520 bhp (550 bhp in PowerBoost mode). Each engine must be very durable, as it must last a whole season. The engine only weighs 120 kilograms, making it one of the lightest 3.4-litre engines ever made. The PowerBoost button on the A1 car allows the engine to reach its maximum of 550 bhp (410 kW). When used at the right time, this feature can encourage overtaking. For the PowerBoost to activate, the throttle position must be above 80% and the speed more than 60 km/h. The button must also be depressed to continue on PowerBoost mode. However, the PowerBoost automatically deactivates itself if the throttle falls below 40%. Each driver only has a limited number of uses of the PowerBoost function. The driver can only use it four times in a sprint race and eight times in a feature race. Once these maximum allocated uses of the PowerBoost have been used, the system is disabled until the end of the race, after which Zytek engineers reset the system for the next race.

The car has an overall length of 4833 mm, with a long wheelbase of 3000 mm and a wide track of 1476 mm (front) and 1468 mm (rear). Its total weight amounts to 615 kilograms, without the driver and the fuel.

- Cylinder block: Sand cast aluminium alloy
- Cylinder head: Sand cast aluminium alloy
- Valvetrain: 4 overhead camshafts 4 valves per Cylinder
- Engine Management: Zytek EMS 4.6.1
- Ignition: Zytek DCDI with coil over plug
- Spark plugs: NGK
- Max speed: 300 km/h

The front and rear suspension is of a double wishbone and pushrod operated twin coil over damper construction. Adjustable ride height, cambers and toe, as well as anti-dive and anti-squat made to optimise drive control. A two-piece carbon clutch was tailored especially for the car to handle 550 bhp (410 kW) and the two racing starts per weekend. The unit combines lightweight construction with durability and reliability. The A1 car's gearchange is by an electronically controlled paddle-shifting via a six-speed paddle-shift semi-automatic sequential transmission. A1 Grand Prix uses slick tyres on normal dry races. Pneumatics were supplied exclusively by Cooper Tires. It uses 100 RON unleaded in 2005-2008 later E30 Biofuel and 70% unleaded gasoline in 2008-2009 for all cars.

=== Second generation ===
A1GP partnered with Ferrari in the 2008–09 season to run upgraded Ferrari F2004 chassis, with the intention of using the cars for six seasons. The original 3.0L Ferrari V10 engine was replaced with a 4.5-litre Ferrari/Maserati V8 engine was capable of delivering up to 600 brake horsepower (450 kW) in PowerBoost mode. Michelin took over the tyre contract for the final season.

== Broadcasters ==
Richard Dorfman was the A1GP's director of broadcasting. All broadcaster information is correct for the 2008–09 season.

Country / Region	Network	Language	Period
World	Gillette World Sport	English	2006–07 onwards 2008–09
Africa	SABC; NT1	English; French	2007–08 onwards 2008–09
Asia	ESPN Star Sports	English	2007–08 onwards
Australia	Fox Sports; Nine Network	English	2007–08 onwards 2008–09
Austria	Premiere	German	Before 2008–09
Bosnia and Herzegovina	OBN	Bosnian	Before 2008–09
Belgium	NT1	French	2008–09
Belgium	EXQI Sport	Dutch	2008–09
Brazil	Rede TV	Portuguese	2008–09
Canada	Setanta; Speed Channel	English	2008–09; Before 2008–09
China	CCTV-5; Beijing TV; Guangdong TV; Shanghai TV	Chinese	Before 2008–09
Czech Republic	Galaxie Sport; Czech Television	Czech	2005–2006; Before 2008–09
Finland	Nelonen Sport	Finnish	2007–08 onwards
France	NT1; Eurosport France	French	2008–09; 2005–06 to 2007–08
Germany	Premiere	German	2005–08
Greece; Cyprus	Supersport; ERT (Greece only, Highlights only)	Greek	2007–08 onwards 2008–09
Hungary	Hálózat TV	Hungarian	Before 2008–09
Indonesia	Global TV tvOne	Indonesian; English	2005–2008; 2008–09
India	Zee Sports; TEN Sports	Hindi; English	2008–09
Ireland	TV3; Sky Sports	English	2007–08 onwards 2005–06 onwards
Italy	Sky Sport; Rai Sport Più	Italian	Before 2008; 2008–09
Latin and Central America	Speed Latin America	Spanish	2007–08 onwards
Lebanon	LBC	Arabic	2008–09
Luxembourg	NT1	French	2008–09
Malaysia	RTM	Malaysian	2007–08 onwards
Malta	Melita		2008–09
Mexico	Televisa Sports	Spanish	2007–08 onwards
Middle East	Al Jazeera	Arabic	Before 2008–09
Monaco	NT1	French	2008–09
Nigeria	Hi TV		2008–09
Netherlands	RTL7	Dutch	2007–08 onwards
New Zealand	TV3	English	2005–06 onwards
Pakistan	GEO Super	Urdu	2008–09
Poland	Polsat	Polish	Before 2008–09
Portugal	Sport TV		2008–09
Russia	RTR Sport (Highlights only)		2008–09
Slovenia	TV3	Slovene	Before 2008–09
South Africa	SABC	English	2005–06 onwards
Spain	Sogecable	Spanish	2007–08 onwards
Sweden	Viasat Motor	Swedish	2008–09
Switzerland	NT1; Schweizer Fernsehen; Premiere	French; German; German	2008–09; 2008–09; Before 2008–09
Ukraine	Poverkhnost TV	Ukrainian	2007–08 onwards
United Kingdom	Sky Sports; Five (highlights only)	English	2005–06 to 2010–11
United States	Setanta; America One (Post-season replays); Speed Channel	English	2008–09; 2008–09; Before 2008–09

== Controversies ==
=== 2006–07 A1 Grand Prix of Nations, Beijing, China ===
The first Chinese round of the 2006–07 A1GP took place on the streets of Beijing. However, the tight hairpin at the end of the back straight was too tight for the cars to negotiate safely, as it was a 180 degree left turn. Cars were running wide and stopping mid corner; therefore, the sessions were red flagged.

A shorter circuit was created, creating another, less tight hairpin halfway up the straight, bypassing most of the old straight. This corner was still not ideal, as drivers ran wide despite the corner being wider and had to avoid the pitlane entry barrier. It had to suffice, though, as otherwise the race would have been cancelled.

However, another problem arose in qualifying when manhole covers on the roads were coming undone due to the racing cars' high downforce and low ride height. Grid positions were decided based on practice times. Some advertising banners also came loose around the circuit.

It was announced that the races would start behind the safety car, as the first corner was also deemed unsafe.

Both races were uneventful, particularly the Sprint Race, which took place almost entirely behind the safety car after course officials failed to remove a single spun car in a timely fashion.

== See also ==
- Formula Acceleration 1
- Acceleration 2014
- Superleague Formula
