= Cornish Lithium =

Mineral exploration and development company in United Kingdom

Cornish Lithium Ltd
- Type: Private
- Industry: Mineral extraction
- Founded: 2016
- Founder: Jeremy Wrathall
- Headquarters: Penryn, Cornwall
- Key people: Jeremy Wrathall (CEO)
- Website: cornishlithium.com

Cornish Lithium is a mineral exploration and development company based in Cornwall, United Kingdom. The company was founded by Jeremy Wrathall in 2016.

Cornish Lithium is building a lithium extraction plant which is backed by the UK Government's Getting Building Fund. The GeoCubed pilot plant will use Direct Lithium Extraction technology to recover lithium from geothermal waters at the United Downs Deep Geothermal Power Project near Redruth. The brine of the United Downs Deep Geothermal Power Project is claimed by Cornish Lithium to be valuable due to its high lithium concentration (220 mg/L), with low magnesium (<5 mg/L), total dissolved solids content of <29 g/L, and a flow rate of 40 to 60 L/s.

The company also has a hard rock exploration project at Trelavour Downs near St Dennis, Cornwall.

In August 2023, the company announced a £53.6 million initial investment from institutional investors, led by the UK Infrastructure Bank alongside The Energy & Minerals Group and TechMet.
