= Anglovaal =

South African holding conglomerate

Anglovaal Group was one of six large South African holding conglomerates that had interests in mining, finance and industry. It was formed in 1933 as the Anglo-Transvaal Consolidated Investment Company Limited with interests initially in mining. In 1981, it became Anglovaal Limited. It was majority owned throughout its existence by the Hersov and Menell families. In the late 1990s, it would form into two separate companies, Anglovaal Industrial Holdings (AVI) and Anglovaal Minerals (Avmin). As a family owned business, all family interests were to be diluted by 2001. By 2003, Anglovaal Minerals became part of African Rainbow Minerals Limited, a listed black empowerment company.

== History ==
The company, Anglo-Transvaal Consolidated Investment Company Limited, was formed in Johannesburg, South Africa in June 1933. It was the creation of mining engineer A.S. (Bob) Hersov, stockbroker Simeon (Slip) G. Menell and Norbert S. Erleigh with the purpose of reopening closed mines after the price of gold rose. They would purchase old mines, closed before the First World War, such as Vogel Deep Mine, Vogelstruis Estates and the Bantjes Consolidated Mines. These mines and new leases obtained for the state government came to be called Rand Leases and closed in 1971.

Anglovaal's exploration arm, Middle Witwatersrand (Western Areas) Limited was formed in May 1933 to explore for gold with exploration beginning around the Potchefstroom area with aerial surveys.

In April 1934, Consolidated Murchison (Transvaal) Gold was floated by Anglovaal and JCI. The mine became a world supplier of antimony by World War II and the mines gold became a by-product. Around the same time, Anglovaal purchased limestone mine options and then floated Anglovaal Cement Limited (Anglo-Alpha Ltd) to manufacture cement for the building market. In 1935, Anglovaal, in association with another company, created the Associated Manganese Mines of South Africa Limited after purchasing leases at Postmasburg and later formed Feralloys Ltd to manufacture chrome and manganese alloys. In 1944, Anglovaal's industrial interests were separated from the mining business when the holding company Anglovaal Industries Ltd was formed. That year Anglovaal purchased Pretoria Glassworks and renamed and floated it as Consolidated Glassworks Ltd later called Consol. It would later purchase Irwin and Johnson (1970), T.W. Beckett, Cerebos, and Bakers South Africa Ltd (1980).

Bob Hersov, a founder and its chairman and joint managing director died suddenly in January 1949. Slip Menell was then elevated to the position as chairman. After the Second World War, drilling began in 1949 in the Orange Free State on the farms Merriespruit, Harmony and Virginia. Enough gold was found to open mine on the Virginia farm in 1955 and Merriespruit in 1956. In 1981, it was renamed Anglovaal Limited. These to later merged into Harmony Gold Mining Company owned by Rand Mines but with Anglovaal a shareholder. Riebeeck mine merged with Anglo Americans Loraine mine to become Loraine Gold Mines Ltd managed by Anglovaal.

As of 1992, Anglovaal accounted for 2.9% of the Johannesburg Stock Exchange's market capitalisation, one of six large companies that controlled 85.7% of the stock exchange.

1998 would see the beginning of the end of the family majority-owned Anglovaal Holdings which split into Anglovaal Limited and Anglovaal Industries (AVI) under a new holding company Anglovaal Industrial Holdings. The two families would control them until June 2001 when all shares would be worth one vote. The remaining mining interests of Anglovaal Limited would be renamed Anglovaal Minerals (Avmin) in December 1998. Avmin would be controlled by the Menell family.

AVI would retain its Consol, I&J and National Brands while selling off Alpha, Aveng, Bearing Man, Tristel Holdings and Grinaker Construction. Aveng (old name Anglovaal Engineering) was an independent company in construction, steel and cement. AVI would be controlled by the Hersov family.

Avmin would retain Saturn diamonds, Avgold, Asmang, Lavino and Horizon Chrome Mines and base metals division of Nkomati GO, Avmin Zambia and Chambisi Metals. It would sell off Avmin Coal Holdings, Forzando Coal Mines, Doornfontein Coal Mines, Eloff Mining Company, Rhino Minerals and Njala Minerals.

In 2000 Avmin would sell its stake in the Venetia diamond mine to De Beers, preventing a possible takeover attempt of Avmin, with De Beers selling its shares of Avmin to investors but not Anglo American. In 2002, Anglo American purchased a 35% portion of Avmin. But the former's investment potential was short-lived when Avim sold a portion of its ownership in Avgold from 60 to 42 percent. Anglo then sold their 34.5% share of Avmin to Harmony and ARMgold in May 2003. The latter two would then make a bid for control of Avgold.

=== Origins of SASOL ===
In the 1930s, Anglovaal, in cooperation with the Burmah Oil Company, created Satmar (South African Torbanite Mining and Refining Company) company to extract oil from shale in the Ermelo area. Its oil refinery was set up in Boksburg. The site was soon depleted. The process then developed into an idea to produce oil from coal, so in 1935, the company purchased a South African licence to build a Fischer-Tropsch plant. Dr H.J. van Eck and Etienne Rousseau became involved with the company but falling oil prices in 1937 and the approach of the Second World War ended the idea temporarily. Van Eck left in 1940, to become chairman of South African Industrial Development Corporation. Anglovaal's decision was to pass on the project which was made for two reasons. One, it had failed to find the finance to turn the project into a viable project and secondly, new gold deposits had been discovered in the Orange Free State, a business they better understood. An interim committee was formed on 2 June 1950 between the state government and Anglovaal that saw the latter transfer all licensing agreements and coal rights on 25 May 1950 to the government and where the name of the future project, SASOL, was proposed.
