= Maktoum bin Hasher bin Maktoum Al Maktoum =

Member of the ruling family of Dubai

Sheikh Maktoum bin Hasher bin Maktoum Al Maktoum (Arabic: الشيخ مكتوم حشر مكتوم آل مكتوم) is a member of Dubai's ruling family. He is a second cousin once removed of Mohammed bin Rashid Al Maktoum, the current ruler of Dubai. Mohammed bin Rashid Al Maktoum's grandfather, Saeed bin Maktoum and Sheikh Maktoum's great-grandfather, Juma bin Maktoum were brothers.

== Early life, education, and career ==
Sheikh Maktoum received a BSBA in Finance with Honors from Suffolk University, Boston, Massachusetts, USA. Sheikh Maktoum is also presently the Chairman of the Dubai International Holding Company (a private investment firm with extensive experience in natural resources, mining, traditional and renewable energy), Al-Nasr Sports Club.

As director of Shadar Holdings Sheikh Maktoum helped bring Virgin Megastores, Promod, Pull and Bear, and Bershka into the United Arab Emirates.

Sheikh Maktoum was the Founder, President and Chairman of the A1 Grand Prix racing series. After a successful 1st season of A1GP, during which Maktoum proved it was an exciting new form of motorsport, it was announced on September 29, 2006 that he was to sell his position as Chairman & Director of A1GP. The transfer of his share in the organisation of A1 Grand Prix to RAB Capital was finalized in December 2006.

Sheikh Maktoum Hasher Maktoum Al Maktoum, was selected as a Young Global Leader 2007 by the World Economic Forum.

Sheikh Maktoum Hasher Maktoum Al Maktoum was awarded the prestigious 'CEO of the Year' honour in the property sector for the Mena region.

In the wake of the financial crisis hitting Dubai bonds heading into 2010, Sheikh Maktoum helped calm markets by buying up Dubai bonds before the debt was restructured.

In May 2011, Shuaa Capital announced that Sheikh Maktoum had been appointed chairman of its board of directors, because of his record of successfully supporting business turnarounds.

== Personal life ==
His elder nephew is Ahmad Mohammad Hasher Al Maktoum.
