= Trayal =

Serbian manufacturing company

- Native name: Трајал Корпорација; Trayal Corporation
- Type: Joint-stock company
- Industry: Manufacturing
- Founded: 31 January 1955; 71 years ago (Current form); 29 June 1889; 137 years ago (Founded)
- Headquarters: Parunovačka 18 V, Kruševac, Serbia
- Area served: Worldwide
- Key people: Miloš Nenezić (General director)
- Products: Tires, explosives, protective wear
- Revenue: ▲€41.75 million (2019)
- Net income: ▲€2.9 million (2019)
- Total assets: ▼€82.70 million (2018)
- Total equity: ▲€14.83 million (2018)
- Owner: Individual shares (33.1%) Pension Insurance Fund (23.1%); Government of Serbia (14.4%) Srbijagas (7%); Others (1.1%)
- Number of employees: 1,100 (2019)
- Subsidiaries: Trayal Hem; Detonit (North Macedonia)
- Website: trayal.rs
- Footnotes; Business ID: 07144083; Tax ID: 100315020

Trayal Corporation (Serbian: Трајал Корпорација, romanized: Trayal Korporacija) is a company manufacturing tires, protective devices and industrial explosives.

== History ==
Trayal Corporation was founded in 1889 in Kruševac as a "Gunpowder Works".

In 2006, the Government of Serbia sold 76.9% of shares of the company to the Bulgarian Brikel (owned by the businessman Hristo Kovachki) for a sum of 12.1 million euros, with the obligation to invest 25.1 million euros. At the time, Trayal Corporation had 3,500 employees in five divisions. However, over the years, most of the production was significantly reduced due to poor management.

In 2011, the American tire manufacturing company Cooper Tire & Rubber Company acquired automobile tire division of Trayal for 13 million euros. The newly established company which has seceded from the Trayal Corporation was named "Cooper Tire & Rubber Company Serbia" d.o.o.

In 2013, the Government of Serbia took over the company's remaining assets, as it accumulated 130 million euros of debt. In 2017, Trayal Corporation developed remotely-controlled anti-hail protection system used in agriculture.

As of 2018, "Trayal Corporation" is the largest employer in the city of Kruševac, with exports to the foreign markets.

== See also ==
- Defense industry of Serbia
- Automotive industry in Serbia
- FK Trayal Kruševac
