= Mennell =

Mennell is a surname. Notable people with the surname include:

- Julie Mennell (born 1970), English academic
- Laura Mennell (born 1980), Canadian actress
- Nick Mennell (born 1976), American actor
- Philip Mennell (1851–1905), British encyclopedist, journalist and newspaper owner
- Stephen Mennell (born 1944), British sociologist

== See also ==
- Menell
- Meynell
