= Cooper Tire & Rubber Company =

Tire manufacturing company

- Type: Subsidiary
- Traded as: NYSE: CTB (1960–2021)
- Industry: Manufacturing
- Founded: 1914; 112 years ago (as M and M Manufacturing Company); Akron, Ohio, U.S.
- Founders: John F. Schaefer; Claude E. Hart
- Headquarters: Findlay, Ohio, U.S.
- Products: Tires
- Revenue: US$ 2.52 billion (2020, last year as independent public company)
- Operating income: US$ 231 million (2020)
- Net income: US$ 143 million (2020)
- Total assets: US$ 2.972 billion (end 2020)
- Total equity: US$ 1.411 billion (end 2020)
- Number of employees: 10,000 (2020)
- Parent: Goodyear
- Subsidiaries: Avon Tyres (1997-2023); Mastercraft Tires; Mickey Thompson Tires & Wheels; Roadmaster Tires; Dean Tires; StarFire Tires
- Website: www.coopertire.com

Cooper Tire & Rubber Company is an American company that specializes in the design, manufacture, marketing, and sales of replacement automobile and truck tires, and has subsidiaries that specialize in medium truck, motorcycle, and racing tires. With headquarters in Findlay, Ohio, Cooper Tire has 60 manufacturing, sales, distribution, technical, and design facilities within its worldwide family of subsidiary companies.

From 1960, the company was publicly traded and listed on the New York Stock Exchange, until it was acquired by Goodyear in June 2021.

== History ==
=== Early history ===
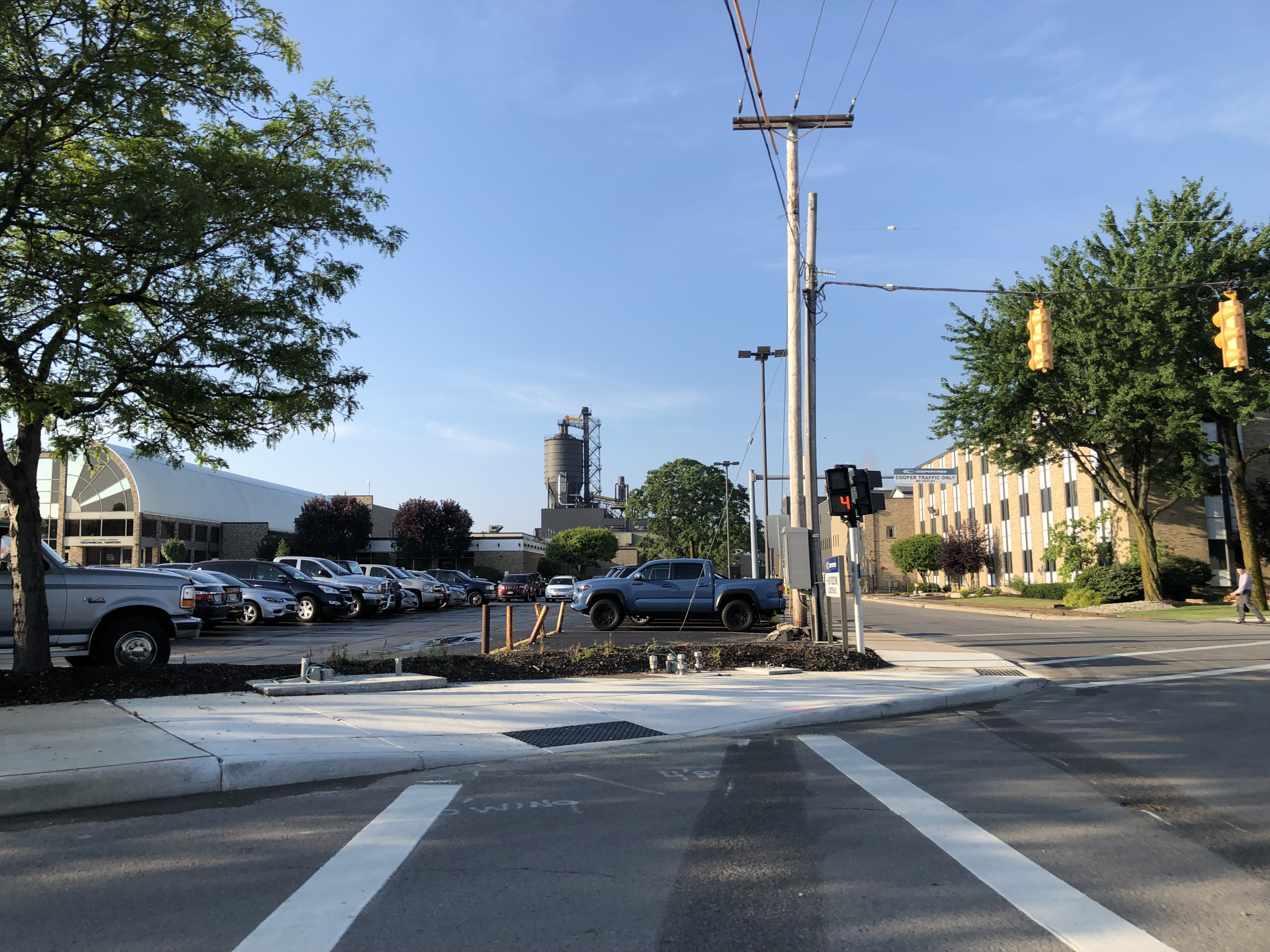
Cooper Tire headquarters in Findlay, Ohio

The earliest corporate lineage for Cooper Tire was the M and M Manufacturing Company, founded in 1914 in Akron, Ohio, by John F. Schaefer and Claude E. Hart, who were related by marriage. Their new company produced tire patches, tire cement, and tire repair kits. They purchased The Giant Tire & Rubber Company of Akron, a tire-rebuilding business, in 1920, and in 1922 moved the business to Findlay, Ohio, at a site at the intersection of Lima and Western avenues that is still occupied by Cooper Tire, adjacent to The Cooper Corporation facility. The Cooper name originates from 1919 when Cincinnati auto-parts dealer I. J. Cooper formed the Cooper Corporation in Findlay, to manufacture new tires. The Cooper Corporation, the M and M Company, and the Falls Rubber company merged in 1930 to form the Master Tire and Rubber Company. The company name was changed to Cooper Tire & Rubber Company in 1946.

The Cooper oval trademark with the Cooper Knight headgear was first registered and used in 1941. In those early years of the brand's identification, the logo also included a banner proclaiming the tires' "armored-cord" construction. The company's red, white, and blue logo became one of the more easily recognized emblems in the tire industry.

During World War II, the company, known as Master Tire and Rubber, manufactured pontoons, landing boats, waterproof bags and camouflage items, inflatable barges, life jackets, and tank decoys, as well as tires, to supply the Allied forces. The U.S. government recognized the company's contribution to the war effort in a 1945 ceremony bestowing the Army-Navy ‘E’ Award (for excellence). Soon after the war (1946), the company name was changed to Cooper Tire & Rubber Company.

=== Public company ===
From 1946 to 1982, Cooper Tire was headed by a member of the Brewer family: first W.B. Brewer, then his sons, Wayne and Edward. Another son, Robert, was a vice president. W.B. Brewer took Cooper Tire public, and on July 11, 1960, the company was listed on the New York Stock Exchange under the ticker symbol "CTB", the "B" standing for "Brewer." Throughout their tenure, the Brewers set a tone for hands-on leadership, management mingling with workers, and taking care of them. They built the trust and loyalty of the workers.

Under the Brewers' leadership, Cooper Tire grew significantly. By 1983, the company joined the ranks of Fortune 500 companies as one of the largest industrial companies in the United States.

=== International expansion ===
Avon Tyres logo

In 1997, Cooper purchased the tire business of Avon Rubber, so that the British company could concentrate on its core businesses of automotive components, technical products, and protective equipment. The Avon Tyre plant in Melksham, England became Cooper's European headquarters.

The company's largest growth acquisition occurred in 1999, when it bought the Standard Products Company, which increased Cooper's total workforce by 10,000 employees. Dearborn, Michigan-based Standard Products produced sealing, plastic trim, and vibration-control systems for the automotive original-equipment industry worldwide. The purchase included Standard Products subsidiaries Oliver Rubber Company and Holm Industries Inc. Oliver Rubber manufactured tread rubber and equipment for the truck-retread industry. Holm produced seals for home and commercial refrigerators.

In December 2003, Cooper agreed to a joint venture with Kenda Rubber Industrial Company to construct a tire-manufacturing plant near Shanghai.

In January 2005, Cooper agreed to purchase 11% of South Korea-based Kumho Tires Company, and also announced the formation of a new commercial division encompassing both Oliver Rubber Company and commercial tires.

In October 2005, Cooper announced an agreement to obtain 51% ownership in China's third largest tire manufacturer, Cooper Chengshan (Shandong) Passenger Tire Company Ltd., and Cooper Chengshan (Shandong) Truck Tire Company Ltd., to produce truck and passenger car tires for mainland Chinese and export markets.

In 2007, Cooper started manufacturing in eastern China with Kenda Rubber Industrial Company, a company based in Taiwan. Cooper generates 25% of its global sales in China.

In 2007, Cooper sold its Oliver Rubber Company subsidiary, which produced tread rubber and retreading equipment, to Michelin for US$69 million.

In December 2011, Cooper bought a unit of the Serbian tire manufacturing company Trayal Corporation from Kruševac, from the Bulgarian company Brikel EAD for a sum of $13 million and invested as much as $50 million. The newly established company, which has disintegrated from the Trayal Corporation, was named "Cooper Tire & Rubber Company Serbia" d.o.o. As of 2016, it has around 740 employees and annual revenue of $76 million.

Indian company Apollo Tyres announced an agreement to buy Cooper Tires for $2.5 billion on June 12, 2013. This would have made Goodyear Tire & Rubber Co. the only major tire manufacturer left in the United States. On December 30, 2013, Apollo pulled out of the deal because Cooper had not disclosed vital information about its lack of control over its Chinese business. The Chinese plant went on an indefinite strike against the proposed acquisition, forcing Apollo to try to lower the $35-per-share bid in the original deal.

In 2018, the Avon Tyre plant in Melksham had its production reduced to motorsport and motorcycle tires, while production of non-specialty products was moved to Serbia.

In June 2020, Cooper announced that it would open a new regional distribution center in Whiteland, Indiana, in early 2021. The new site will replace the company's facility in Franklin and increase product storage capacity.

=== Acquisition by Goodyear ===
On February 22, 2021, Goodyear Tire and Rubber Company announced that it entered into an agreement to acquire Cooper Tire for about $2.8 billion in cash and shares. The transaction was closed in June 2021, and was to result in Cooper shareholders owning around 16% of the combined company.

The company discontinued its manufacturing operations in England in December 2023. In early 2024, Cooper sold its racecar tire manufacturing equipment and sublicensed the Avon brand to Nova Motorsport, a subsidiary of SPC Rubber led by former Avon executives, which moved production to Portugal.

Cooper launched a new corporate branding in May 2026. The circle logo was replaced with the old knight helm combined with a wolf, while dark green replaced blue as the main color in reference to off-roading.

== Brands ==
Cooper Tires produces Cooper-branded tires for passenger cars, light trucks, sport utility vehicles, and commercial trucks. It also manufactures tires under the associated brand names Dean, Hercules, Mastercraft, Mickey Thompson, Roadmaster, and Starfire.

Cooper produced Avon products from 1997 to 2023. It formerly manufactured all tires sold under the Sears Guardsman brand at Sears, Roebuck & Co. stores. Cooper manufactures tires for Discount Tire under the Arizonian brand name, and Futura Tires for Pep Boys.

== Motorsports and sponsorships ==
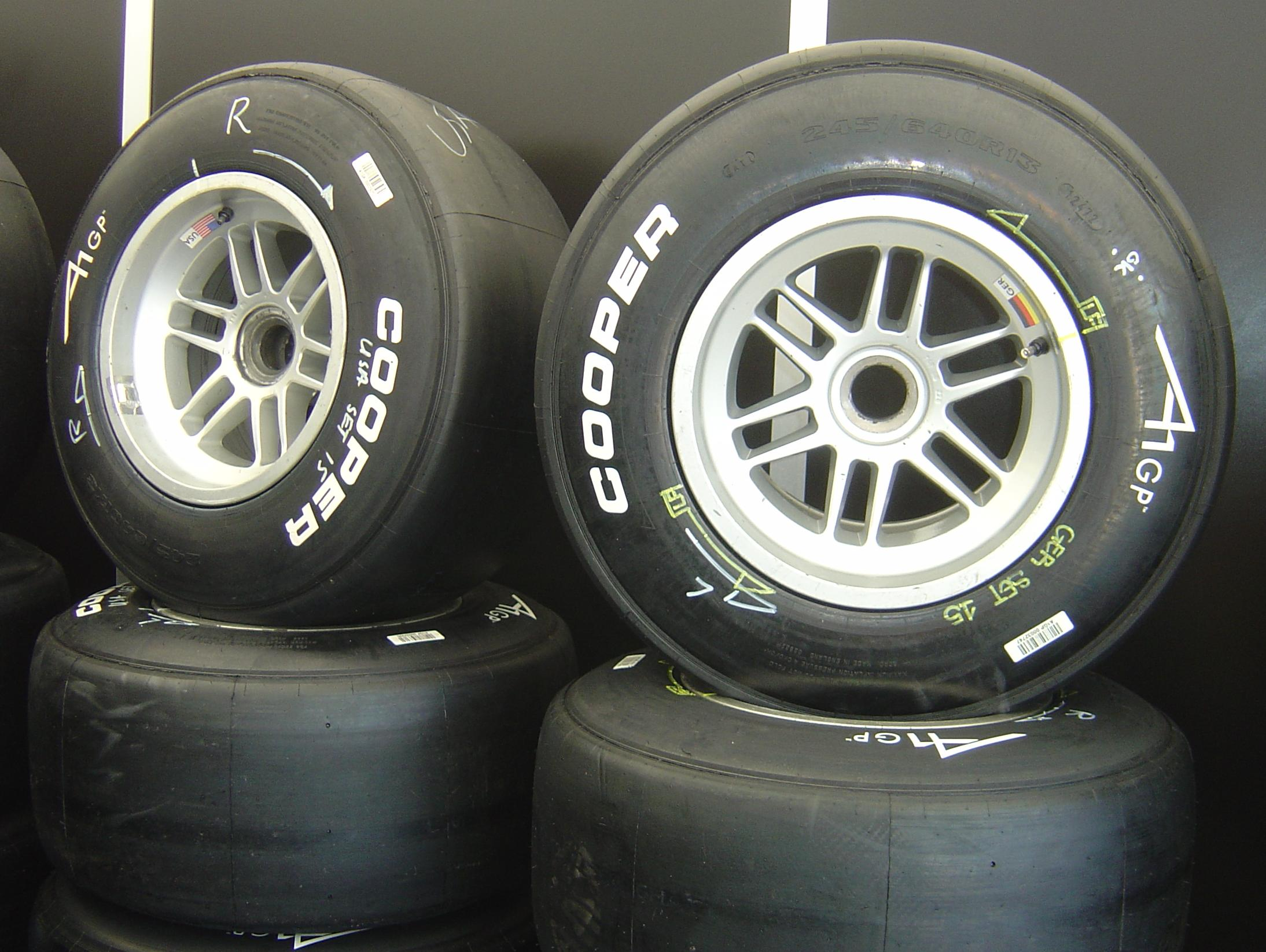
Cooper racing tires (A1GP)

Cooper became the official tire of the A1 Grand Prix, dubbed the World Cup of Motorsports, for the series' initial 2005–06 season and was under contract to produce slick tires and treaded rain tires for the series championship until 2008.

Since 1982, Avon Tyres had been the sole supplier for the British Formula Three Championship. From the 2009 season onwards, these were rebranded "Cooper", as Cooper became the championship's official title sponsor, and was to until the end of the 2014 season at least. Avon Tyres was also the exclusive supplier for the International Formula 3000 championship and the FIA Formula Two Championship when revived in 2009 to 2012.

In April 2010, Cooper/Avon Tyres presented a written proposal to Formula One Team Association to be the official tire supplier for the 2011 Formula One season. This was ultimately rejected and Pirelli became the official tire supplier for 2011 onwards.

In the United States, Cooper became the official tire of the Champ Car Atlantic Championship in 2007. Cooper became the official tire of the IMSA Prototype Lites series (formerly IMSA Lites) in 2010. Cooper Tires is the official supplier of the Mazda Road to Indy formula ladder: USF2000 (since 2010), Pro Mazda (since 2013), and Indy Lights (since 2014).

As of 2014, Cooper is the official supplier of the FIA World Rallycross Championship. The Americas Rallycross Championship also uses Cooper Tires.

On July 7, 2017, it was announced that Avon Tyres would be the primary kit sponsor for Championship side Derby County for the 2017/2018 season. In 2020, due to the COVID-19 pandemic, Cooper announced that the Road to Indy Presented by Cooper Tires will proceed through virtual races using racing simulation platform by iRacing.

== Management and company personnel ==
Cooper has 10,540 employees as of its 2016 annual report. Bradley E. Hughes is Cooper's president and CEO.

== See also ==
- List of tire companies
