= Anastase-Marie al-Karmali =

Iraqi Catholic priest and Discalced Carmelite friar

Reverend Father Anastase-Marie al-Karmali
- أنستاس ماري الكرملي
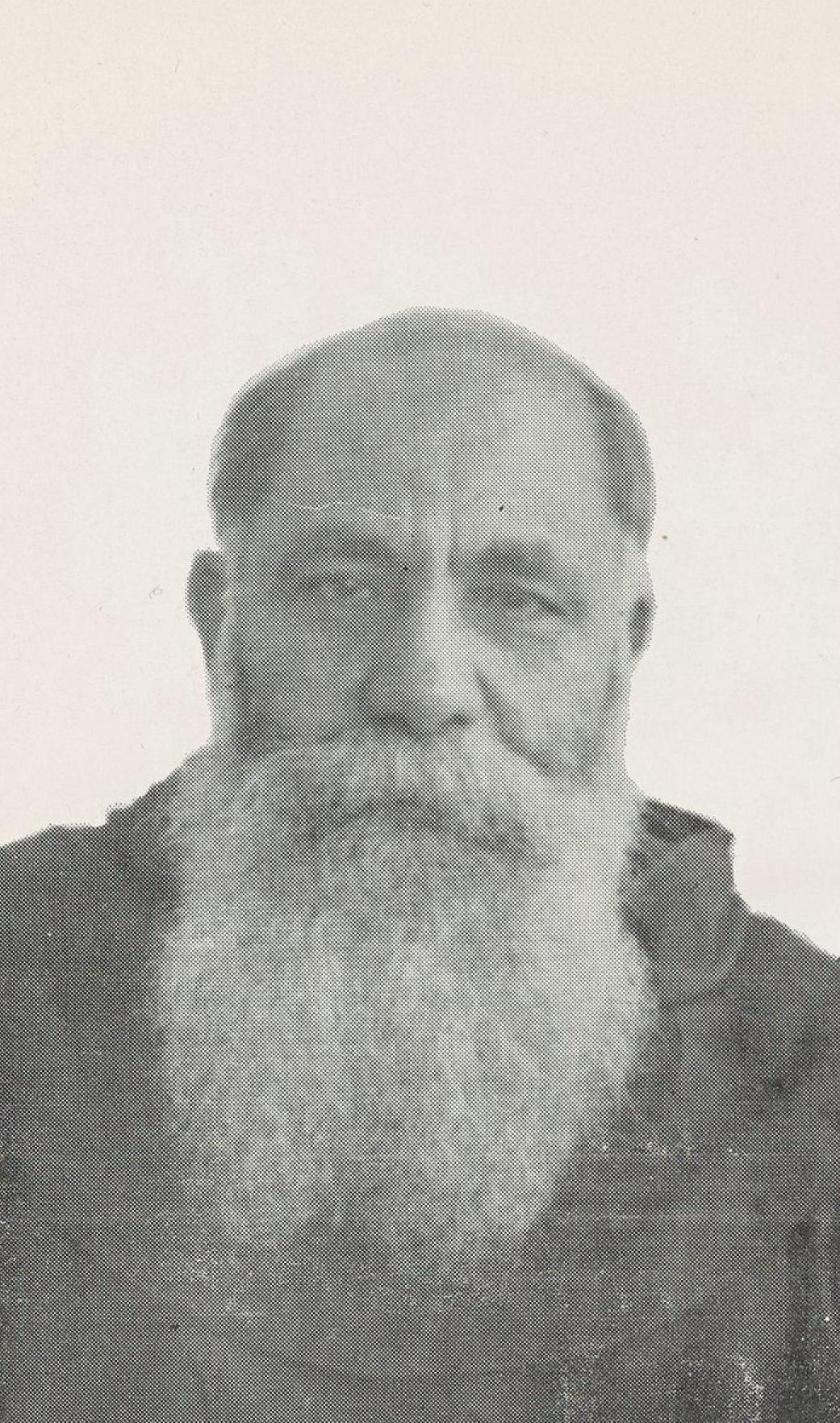
- Born: Butrus Mikha'il 'Awwad al-Marini; 5 August 1866; Baghdad, Baghdad vilayet, Ottoman Iraq
- Died: 7 January 1947 (aged 80); Baghdad, Kingdom of Iraq
- Resting place: Churchyard of the Latin Cathedral of St. Joseph, Baghdad, Iraq
- Other names: Anastase-Marie de Saint Élie, Anastasius-Maria the Carmelite, Anastasius-Maria of Saint Elijah, Pierre Marini, Pierre-Michel Marini
- Occupations: Catholic priest, Discalced Carmelite friar; lexicologist, lexicographer and philologist of the Arabic language; editor of the Lughat al-Arab; founding member of the Academy of the Arabic Language in Cairo
- Organization: Order of Discalced Carmelites
- Notable work: Al-Musa'id (unfinished)
- Movement: Nahda

Butrus Mikha'il 'Awwad al-Marini (Arabic: بطرس ميخائيل عواد الماريني / ALA-LC: Buṭrus Mīkhāʼīl ʻAwwād al-Mārīnī; (Note: In Belgium and France, where he studied, his name was Francised as Pierre Marini [pjɛʁ maʁini] or Pierre-Michel Marini [pjɛʁ.miʃɛl maʁini].) 5 August 1866 – 7 January 1947), better known as Anastase-Marie (Note: French pronunciation: [anastaz.maʁi]. "Anastase-Marie" is a masculine French compound name using the given names Anastase and Marie.) al-Karmali (Arabic: أنستاس ماري الكرملي / ALA-LC: Anastās Mārī al-Karmalī, lit. 'Anastasius-Maria the Carmelite') or by his original religious name Anastase-Marie de Saint Élie (Note: French pronunciation: [anastaz.maʁi də sɛ̃t‿eli]; Arabic: أنستاس ماري دي سنت إيلي / ALA-LC: Anastās Mārī dī Sant Īlī.) (lit. 'Anastasius-Maria of Saint Elijah'), was an Iraqi Catholic priest and Discalced Carmelite friar of Lebanese and Iraqi origins, best known for his contributions to Arabic lexicology and lexicography and to Arabic philology, as well as for editing the Lughat al-Arab (Arabic: لغة العرب / ALA-LC: Lughat al-ʻArab, lit. 'The Language of the Arabs'), a "literary, scientific and historical" periodical issued from 1911 to 1914 and from 1926 to 1931. He was also a founding member of the Academy of the Arabic Language in Cairo. Among his most famous works is an unfinished dictionary, Al-Musa'id (Arabic: المساعد / ALA-LC: Al-Musāʻid, lit. 'The Assistant'), of which two volumes were published posthumously. He is considered to have been "one of the artisans of the Nahda" (the Arab renaissance of the late 19th – early 20th century).

== Life ==
=== Background and studies ===
Butrus's father, Mikha'il al-Marini, son of 'Awwad al-Marini, came from Bhersaf (modern-day Lebanon), and moved to Baghdad (modern-day Iraq) to work as an interpreter. In Baghdad, Mikha'il married Butrus's mother, an Iraqi woman named Maryam Jubran, daughter of the Chaldean Augustin Jubran from Baghdad, descending from an old Iraqi Christian family. Butrus was born in Baghdad, and was the fourth son of Mikha'il and Maryam.

Butrus received his primary education from the Madrasat al-Ābāʼ al-Karmalīyīn (School of the Carmelite Fathers) in Baghdad. For his secondary education, he went to the Madrasat al-Ittifāq al-Kāthūlīkī, also in Baghdad. While still a pupil, at the age of 12, he showed such ability in Arabic that he started to give private lessons. He graduated from the Madrasat al-Ittifāq al-Kāthūlīkī in 1882, at the age of 15, and was then appointed as teacher of the Arabic language at the Carmelite residence in Basra by the superior of the Carmelite mission. Around that time, al-Marini's articles began to be published by the Jesuit Beiruti periodical Al-Bashir.

The death in 1883 of Butrus al-Bustani, author of the Arabic dictionary Muhit al-Muhit, inspired al-Marini to start writing an Arabic dictionary of his own, which would however remain unfinished by the time of his death. Al-Marini initially titled his projected dictionary Dhayl Lisan al-'Arab (Arabic: ذيل لسان العرب / ALA-LC: Dhayl Lisān al-ʻArab, lit. 'The Tail to the Lisan al-Arab') before choosing the title Al-Musa'id (Arabic: المساعد / ALA-LC: Al-Musāʻid, lit. 'The Assistant').

In 1886, al-Marini went to the College of the Jesuit Fathers in Beirut (Kullīyat al-Ābāʼ al-Yasūʻīyīn fī Bayrūt) to study Arabic, Latin, Greek and French literature. On 5 May 1888 he entered the Carmelite monastery in Chèvremont, near Liège, Belgium. He then went to Montpellier, France, to study philosophy and theology. He took his simple vow in June 1889 and his solemn vow in 1892. He was ordained a priest on 22 October 1894, and took the name Anastase-Marie de Saint Élie ('Anastasius-Maria of Saint Elijah'). He would become known in Arabic as "al-Karmali", meaning 'the Carmelite'.

=== Early years as a priest ===
In the period following his ordination, al-Karmali toured Spain before returning to Baghdad. As principal of the Madrasat al-Ābāʼ al-Karmalīyīn, he taught Arabic and French, preached and counselled. At the same time, his articles were published in the magazines of Egypt, Syria and Iraq. Some of these articles were about the different communities of Iraq. In 1900 and 1901, al-Karmali published two articles about the Mandaeans, (Note: The articles in question are: "Al-Ṣābiʼah aw al-Mandāʼīyah" الصابئة أو المندائية. Al-Machriq. 3 (17): 777–785. 1 September 1900.; "Al-Ṣābiʼah aw al-Mandāʼīyah" الصابئة أو المندائية. Al-Machriq. 4 (9): 400–406. 1 May 1901.) a community with which he would become "deeply involved". However, his description of the Shabak people in an article of 1902 (Note: The article in question is "Tafkihat al-Adhhān fī Taʻrīf Thalāthat Adyān" تفكهة الأذهان في تعريف ثلاثة أديان. Al-Machriq. 5 (13): 577–582. 1 July 1902.) "has been the source of much misunderstanding and biased secondary literature."

In June 1908, al-Karmali was asked to escort Louis Massignon from Baghdad to Beirut after Massignon's captivity. Al-Karmali eventually accompanied him all the way to Brittany, where he met Massignon's parents, before returning to Baghdad. Al-Karmali and Louis Massignon would maintain a correspondence until 1936.

In 1911, al-Karmali got involved in the academic debates which followed the discoveries (including his own discovery) of forged manuscripts of the Yazidi Book of Revelation and the Yazidi Black Book. (Note: In an article published in Anthropos (Marie, Anastase (1911). "La découverte récente des deux livres sacrés des Yézîdis". Anthropos. 6 (1): 1–39. JSTOR 40444071.), al-Karmali announced his discovery of what he claimed to be the original Kurdish versions of Arabic manuscripts which had been circulating since the 1880s containing the Yazidi Book of Revelation and the Yazidi Black Book. A German translation of Anastase's text was published two years later (Bittner 1913). For a time, it was assumed that the new discoveries did indeed represent an ancient scriptural tradition. However, a few years later Alphonse Mingana, a Christian scholar from the Zakho area who claimed to know the Yezidis well, convincingly challenged the authenticity of these works as representatives of an ancient manuscript tradition. In view of later discoveries and insights, it now seems clear that these "Sacred Books" were indeed forgeries, although their contents suggest that their author had considerable knowledge of authentic Yezidi traditions.)

Also in 1911, al-Karmali founded Lughat al-Arab ('The Language of the Arabs'), a "literary, scientific historical monthly magazine" (Arabic: مجلة شهرية أدبية علمية تاريخية / ALA-LC: majallah shahrīyah adabīyah ʻilmīyah tārīkhīyah). The magazine's publication would be interrupted by World War I, before resuming for six more years between 1926 and 1931. The discovery of the lost text of the first Arabic dictionary, the Kitab al-'Ayn, was announced in 1914 in this journal.

=== World War I and later years ===
In 1914, as World War I had started, the Ottomans accused al-Karmali of being a spy and exiled him to Kayseri in Central Anatolia, where he was retained until 1916. Upon his release, al-Karmali returned to Baghdad in July 1916. During his absence, his library had been destroyed in great part. Al-Karmali would however rebuild his collection, which would number 15,000 volumes and 2,500 manuscripts in the mid-1930s.

Around 1920, al-Karmali became the first librarian of the Maktabat al-Salām (Peace Library) in Baghdad, and introduced a system of modern management. He helped develop the Library's collection, donating printed materials from his private collection, when other collections in foreign languages remained in the monastery library. The Peace Library would later be renamed the Baghdad Public Library, and in 1961 would become the basis for the establishment of the Iraq National Library.

In 1928, a jubilee was held in Baghdad to celebrate al-Karmali's scholarly career, chaired by the poet Jamil Sidqi al-Zahawi, with Ahmad Hamid al-Sarraf serving as secretary of the organizing committee. In his address, al-Sarraf drew a parallel between the celebrated friendship of the 10th-century Muslim poet al-Sharif al-Radi and the Sabian writer Abu Ishaq al-Sabi, and the contemporary bond between al-Zahawi and al-Karmali, presenting both as proof of Muslim-Christian coexistence in Iraq. He concluded with verses that became widely quoted:

We have lived, and through the ages our land has lived:
Our mosques standing side by side with churches.
And our people will live in a unity of their own:
Our turbans side by side with clerical caps.

— Ahmad Hamid al-Sarraf

In the 1930s, al-Karmali played an instrumental role in defending the Mandaean community against accusations of astrolatry, by taking part in the case filed by the Mandaean high priest Dakhil Aidan against the Iraqi historian 'Abd al-Razzaq al-Hasani. (Note: Shaykh Dakhil Aidan, a ganzibra (senior Mandaean priest) from Nasiriyah, had filed a lawsuit against the Iraqi historian 'Abd al-Razzaq al-Hasani, who had accused the Mandaeans of astrolatry in a 1931 book. Shaykh Dakhil then presented a copy of the Ginza Rabba before a court of law in Baghdad. Al-Karmali, who served as a translator and witness, translated passages from the Ginza Rabba in which astrolatry was expressly prohibited.)

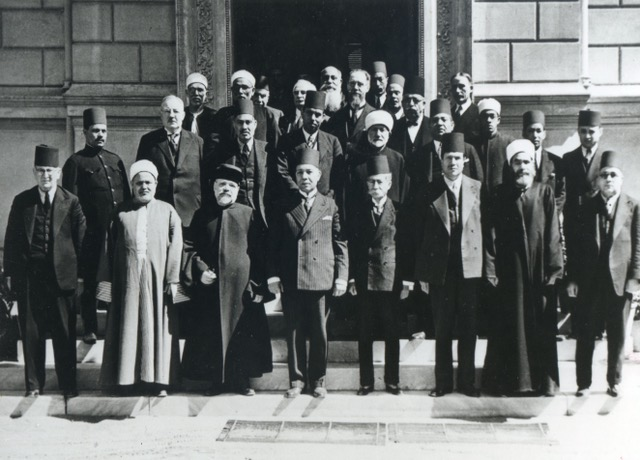
Photograph of the members of the Academy of the Arabic Language in Cairo during its first session. Al-Karmali stands at the back.

On 8 October 1933, al-Karmali was appointed as a member of the Academy of the Arabic Language in Cairo by Fuad I of Egypt. He took part in it from its inaugural session of 1934 onwards.

Shortly before his death, al-Karmali donated 2,500 books and 1,500 manuscripts from his personal library to the Iraq Museum Library. (Note: The Mandaic manuscripts collected by al-Karmali were cited by E. S. Drower and Rudolf Macuch in their dictionary of the Mandaic language, A Mandaic Dictionary, published after al-Karmali's death.) Al-Karmali died in Baghdad on 7 January 1947.

== Writings ==
As of 2010, many of al-Karmali's writings were unpublished or lost.

=== Books ===
In Arabic

- Aghlāṭ al-Lughawīyīn al-Aqdamīn أغلاط اللغويين الأقدمين [Mistakes of the Ancient Linguists]. 1933.
- Al-Musāʻid المساعد [The Assistant]. Vol. 1. Baghdad. 1972.
- Al-Musāʻid المساعد [The Assistant]. Vol. 2. Baghdad. 1972.
- Fī al-Lughah wa-Shuʻarāʼ Baghdād wa-Kuttābhā في اللغة، وشعراء بغداد وكتَّابها [On Language, and the Poets and Writers of Baghdad], in five volumes.
- Nushūʼ al-Lughah al-ʻArabīyah wa-Numūhā wa-Iktihālhā نشوء اللغة العربية ونموها واكتهالها [The Emergence of the Arabic language, its Growth and Complexity].
- Al-Nuqūd al-ʻArabīyah wa-ʻIlm al-Namīyāt النقود العربية وعلم النميّات [Arab Money and the Science of Growth].
- Al-Fawz bil-Murād fī Tārīkh Baghdād الفوز بالمراد في تاريخ بغداد [Winning the Wanted on the History of Baghdad].
- Khilāṣat Tārīkh al-ʻIrāq خلاصة تاريخ العراق [Concise History of Iraq].
- Adyān al-ʻArab أديان العرب [The Religions of the Arabs].
- Tārīkh al-Kurd تاريخ الكرد [History of the Kurds].
- Jamharat al-Lughāt جمهرة اللغات [Population of Languages].
- Al-Lamʻ al-Tārīkhīyah wal-ʻIlmīyah اللمع التاريخية والعلمية [Historical and Scientific Illumination].
- Juzʼān Kabīrān جزآن كبيران [Two Large Forms].
- Mazārāt Baghdād wa-Tarājim baʻḍ al-ʻUlamāʼ مزارات بغداد وتراجم بعض العلماء [Attractions of Baghdad and Translations of Some Scholars]. (Note: Mentioned in Majallat Sūmir مجلة سومر [Sumer Magazine].)
- Al-ʻArab Qabl al-Islām العرب قبل الإسلام [The Arabs Before Islam].
- Amthāl al-ʻAwām fī Baghdād wal-Mawṣil wal-Baṣrah أمثال العوام في بغداد والموصل والبصرة [Proverbs of Baghdad, Mosul and Basra].

In French

- L'origine élianique de l'Ordre de Notre-Dame du Mont-Carmel d'après deux manuscrits arabes inédits. 1908.

=== Articles ===
In Arabic

- "Al-Ṣābiʼah aw al-Mandāʼīyah" الصابئة أو المندائية. Al-Machriq. 3 (17): 777–785. 1 September 1900.
- "Al-Ṣābiʼah aw al-Mandāʼīyah" الصابئة أو المندائية. Al-Machriq. 4 (9): 400–406. 1 May 1901.
- "Tafkihat al-Adhhān fī Taʻrīf Thalāthat Adyān" تفكهة الأذهان في تعريف ثلاثة أديان. Al-Machriq. 5 (13): 577–582. 1 July 1902.
- "Al-Maradah aw al-Jarājimah" المردة أو الجراجمة [The Marada or the Jarajima]. Al-Machriq. 6: 301–309. 1903.

In French

- De St. Elie, P. Anastase Marie (1908). "La femme du désert autrefois et aujourd'hui". Anthropos. 3 (1): 53–67. JSTOR 40442525.
- De St. Elie, P. Anastase Marie (1908). "Les Racusiens". Anthropos. 3 (3): 556–558. JSTOR 40442324.
- De St. Elie, P. Anastase Marie (1909). "Aventures d'un voyage en 1861 dans le Yémen". Anthropos. 4 (2): 416–441. JSTOR 40442410.
- De St. Elie, P. Anastase Marie (1910). "Le culte rendu par les Musulmans aux sandales de Mahomet". Anthropos. 5 (2): 363–366. JSTOR 40443556.
- Marie, Anastase (1911). "La découverte récente des deux livres sacrés des Yézîdis". Anthropos. 6 (1): 1–39. JSTOR 40444071.

== Awards and honours ==
- Ordre des Palmes académiques (1920)
- Member of the Order of the British Empire

== Sources ==
- Ālūsī, Sālim (1970). في ذكرى الأب الكرملي الراهب العلامة (in Arabic).
- Avon, Dominique (2010). "Un carme dans la langue arabe, Anastase Marie de Saint-Élie". In Bocquet, Jérôme (ed.). L'enseignement français en Méditerranée (in French). Presses universitaires de Rennes. pp. 187–206. doi:10.4000/books.pur.103274. ISBN 978-2-7535-1189-7.
- ʻAwdāt, Ḥusayn (1990). الموسوعة الصحفية العربية (in Arabic). جامعة الدول العربية، المنظمة العربية للتربية والثقافة والعلوم، ادارة الثقافة،. ISBN 978-9973-15-045-5.
- ʻAwwād, Kūrkīs [Gūrgīs] (1966). الأب أنستاس ماري الكرملي: حياته ومؤلفاته (١٨٦٦-١٩٤٧) (in Arabic).
- Bruinessen, Martin van (1999). "The Shabak". In Bruinessen, Martin van; Blau, Joyce (eds.). Islam des Kurdes.
- Dagher, J. A. (1951). Répertoire des bibliothèques du Proche et du Moyen-Orient. Paris: UNESCO.
- Guest, John S. (2012). Survival Among the Kurds. Routledge. ISBN 978-1-136-15736-3.
- Häberl, Charles G. (2010). "Neo-Mandaic in Fin de Siècle Baghdad". Journal of the American Oriental Society. 130 (4). American Oriental Society: 551–560. ISSN 0003-0279. JSTOR 23044557.
- Haywood, John (1960). Arabic lexicography: its history, and its place in the general history of lexicography. Brill.
- Moosa, Matti (1986). The Maronites in History. Syracuse University Press. ISBN 978-0-8156-2365-6.
