= Car seat =

Seat used in automobiles

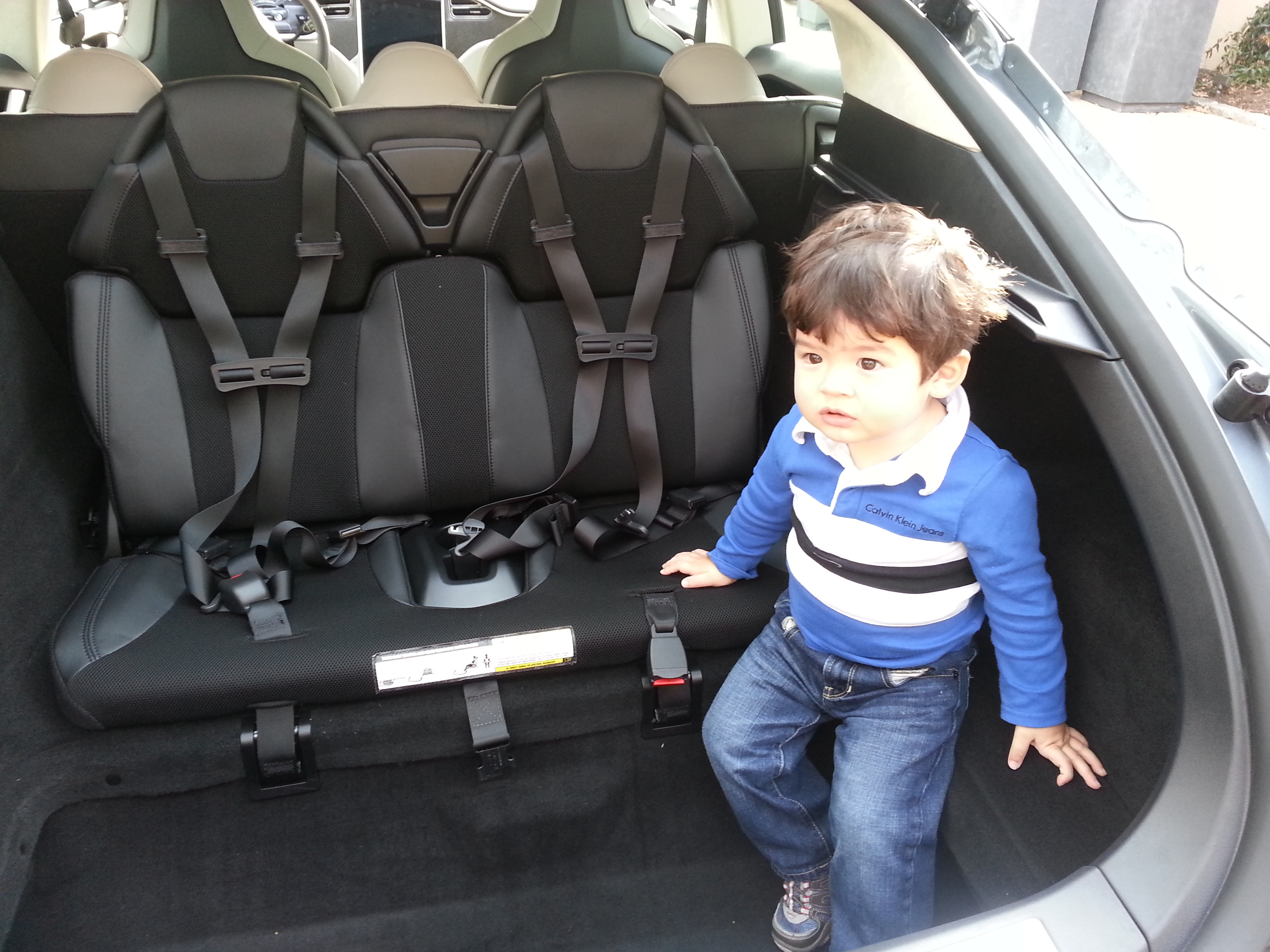
Tesla Model S rear back facing seats

A car seat is a seat used in automobiles. Most car seats are made from inexpensive but durable material in order to withstand prolonged use. The most common material is polyester.

== Bucket seat and bench seat ==
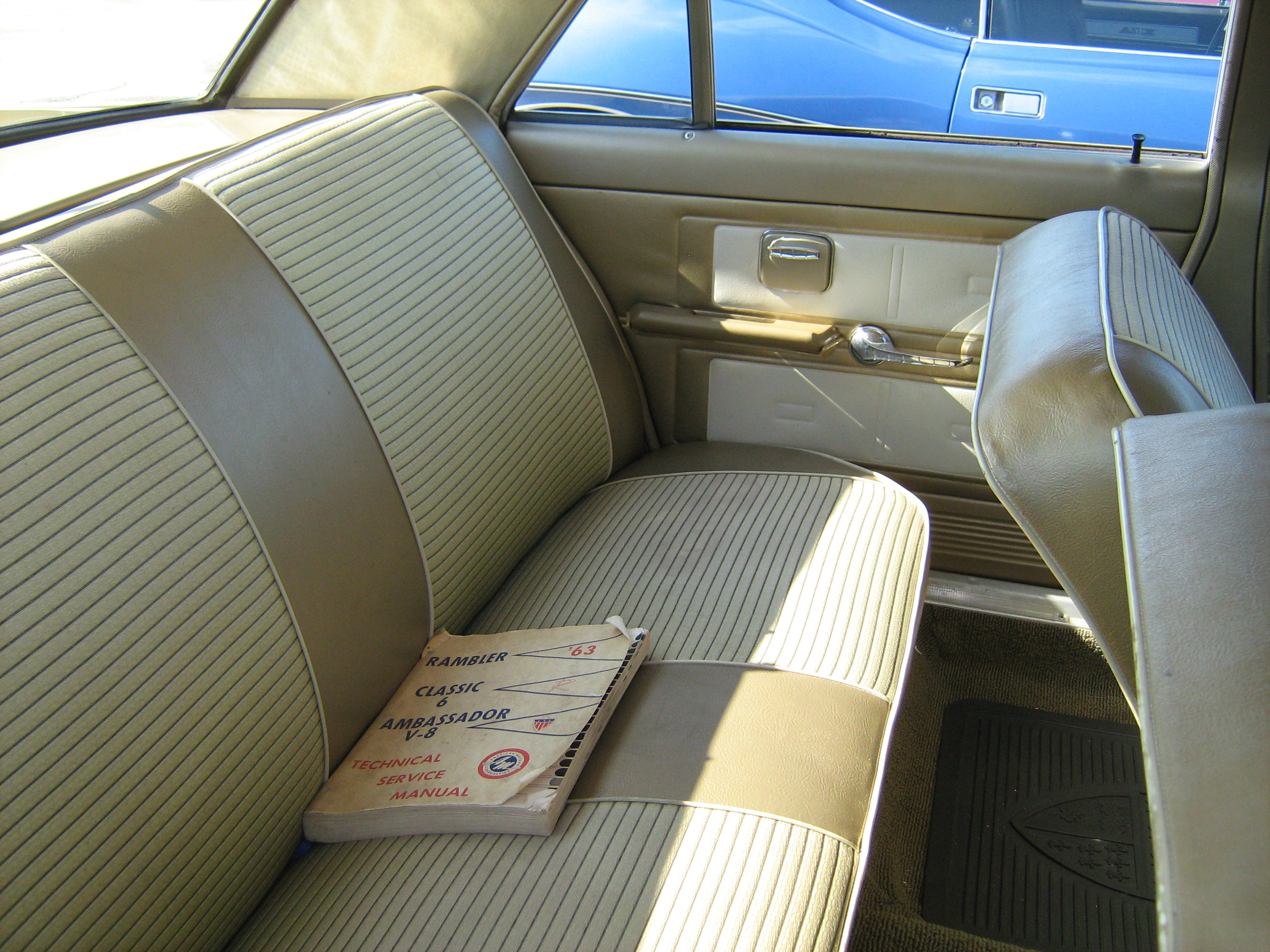
Rear bench seat for three adult passengers in an AMC Ambassador

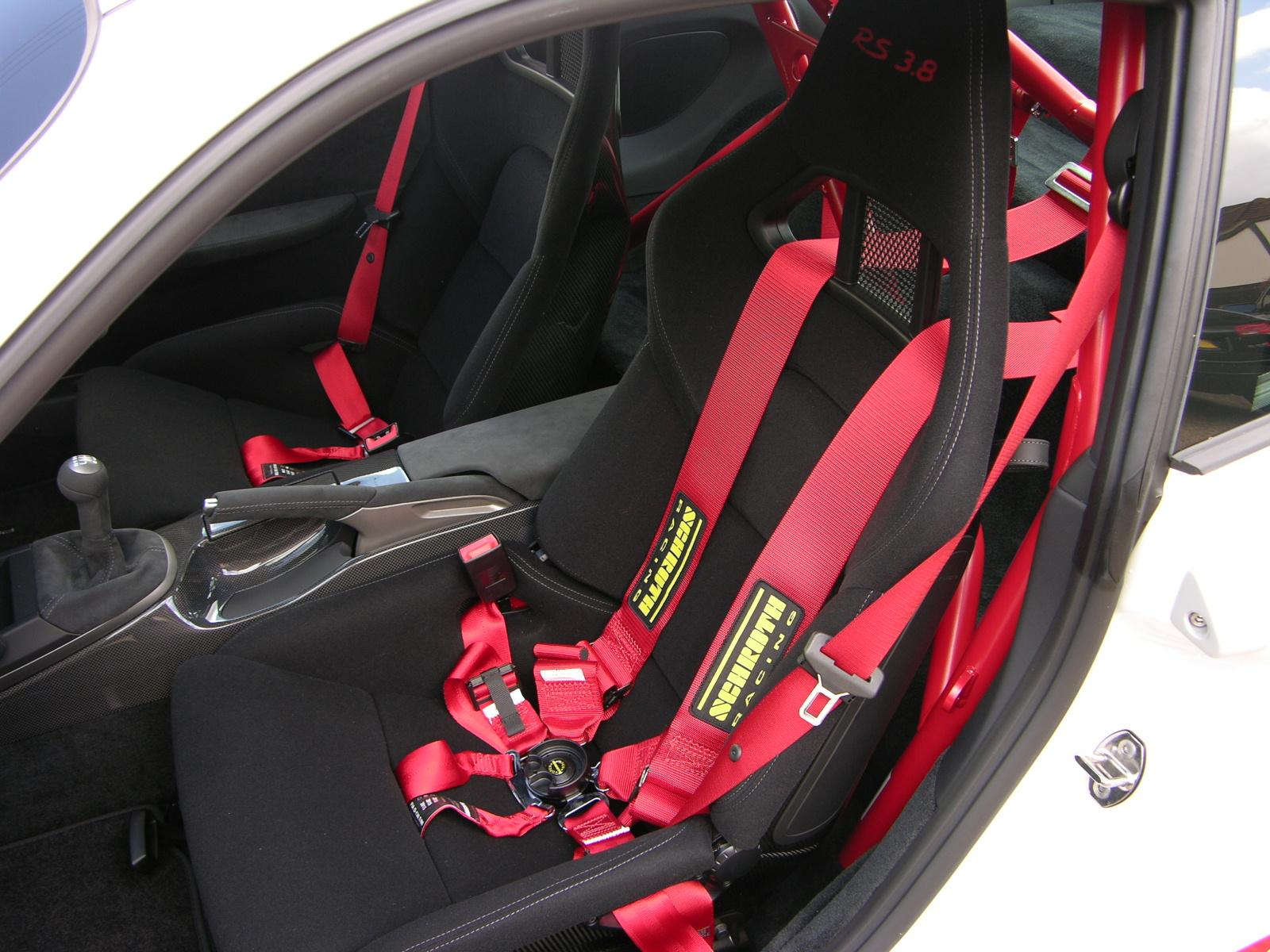
Bucket seat with six-point seat belts from Schroth in Porsche 997 GT3 RS 3.8

A bucket seat is a separate seat with a contoured platform designed to accommodate one person, distinct from a bench seat that is a flat platform designed to seat up to three people. Individual bucket seats typically have rounded backs and may offer a variety of adjustments to fit different passengers.

== Folding seats ==
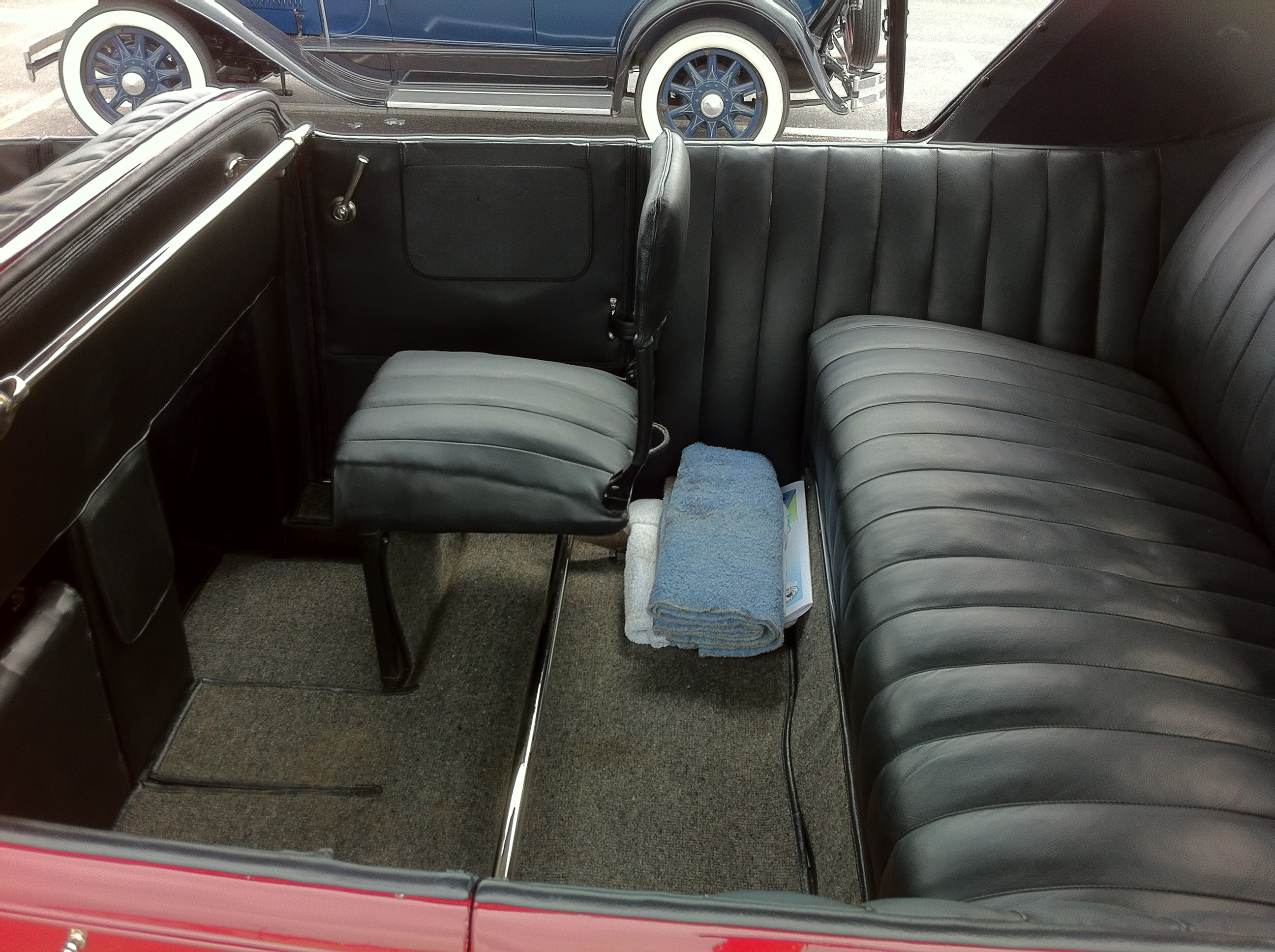
Auxiliary folding seat in a 1921 Hudson Phaeton

Early touring cars featured folding auxiliary seats to offer additional passenger capacity. Some early automobiles were available with an exterior rumble seat that folded open into an upholstered seat for one or two passengers.

Some vehicle models offer fold-down rear seats, to gain cargo space when they are not occupied by passengers.

A fold-down front-passenger seat was a feature on the Chrysler PT Cruiser to fit longer items such as a 240-centimetre (8 ft) ladder inside the vehicle.

== Ergonomics: lumbar and thigh support ==
The lumbar is the region of the spine between the diaphragm and the pelvis; it supports the most weight and is the most flexible. The adjustable lumbar mechanisms in seats allow the user to change the seat back shape in this region, to make it more comfortable and include adjustable lumbar cushion. Some seats are long enough to support full thigh and follow back curves.

== Safety ==
The National Traffic and Motor Vehicle Safety Act enacted by the U.S. in 1966 established standards of strength for automobile seats. These included requirements for proper anchorage and construction of automobile vehicle seat assemblies. The legal requirements in some jurisdictions for a child to sit up front is 150 cm (5 ft) and they must weigh more than 36 kg (80 lb). Some studies have shown that drivers have an aversion towards carrying the full capacity number of passengers due to concerns over insufficient vision through the back window.

- An anti-submarine seat is a kind of seat that incorporates specially shaped panels in the forward edge of the seat cushion, reducing the tendency for the occupant to slide beneath the seatbelt in a severe frontal collision. Anti-submarine seating is a safety feature that may be more important for the front seats than the rear seats.
- A child safety seat or child restraint system is a restraint which is secured to the seat of an automobile equipped with safety harnesses or seat belts, to hold a child in the event of a crash. All 50 states require child seats with specific criteria. Requirements vary based on a child's age, weight and height. The National Child Passenger Safety Board, managed by the National Safety Council, maintains the quality and integrity of the National Child Passenger Safety Certification Training Program. The program is used to train and certify child passenger safety technicians and instructors in order to assist caregivers in safe transportation of children.
- Rear-facing car seats are the best safety seats for newborns and infants.

Side airbags are often built right into the outer edge of the seatback. Seats so equipped should not be covered which impedes the operation of the airbag.

== Power seats ==
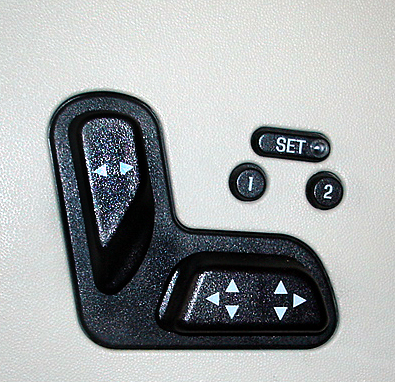
The power seat adjustments in a Lincoln Town Car. The seat controls are located on the door panels, next to the memory seat controls. Above the seat settings are the memory control settings that also set the mirrors and foot pedals.

Some car seat systems are set up with a battery-powered automatic control to adjust how the seat sits in the car.

In suitably equipped cars, seats and mirrors can be adjusted using electric controls. Some vehicles let the driver(s) save the adjustments in memory (memory seat) for later recall, with the push of a button. Most systems allow users to store more than one set of adjustments. This allows multiple drivers to store their comfort settings, or a single driver to store several different occupant positions. Some vehicles associate memorized settings with a specifically numbered, remotely operated key fob, resetting a seat to the position associated with that fob when the vehicle is unlocked (e.g. key fob #1 sets seats to memory position #1, #2 to #2, etc.).

== Covers ==
Car seat covers are accessories that protect the original seat upholstery from wear and add a custom look to a vehicle's interior. They can help to maintain the resale value of the vehicle and maximize the comfort of the driver and passengers.

== Seat construction ==
=== Parts ===
- Armrest
- Backrest, with lumbar support
- Headrest
- Seat base
- Seat track

=== Adjustments ===
- Backrest angle
- Cushion edge
- Fore-and-aft position
- Headrest angle
- Headrest level
- Lumbar position
- Seat depth
- Seat height
- The upper section of the seat backrest, may be tilted to the front for optimum, individual shoulder support
- Variable head support at the sides
- Cushion Tilt
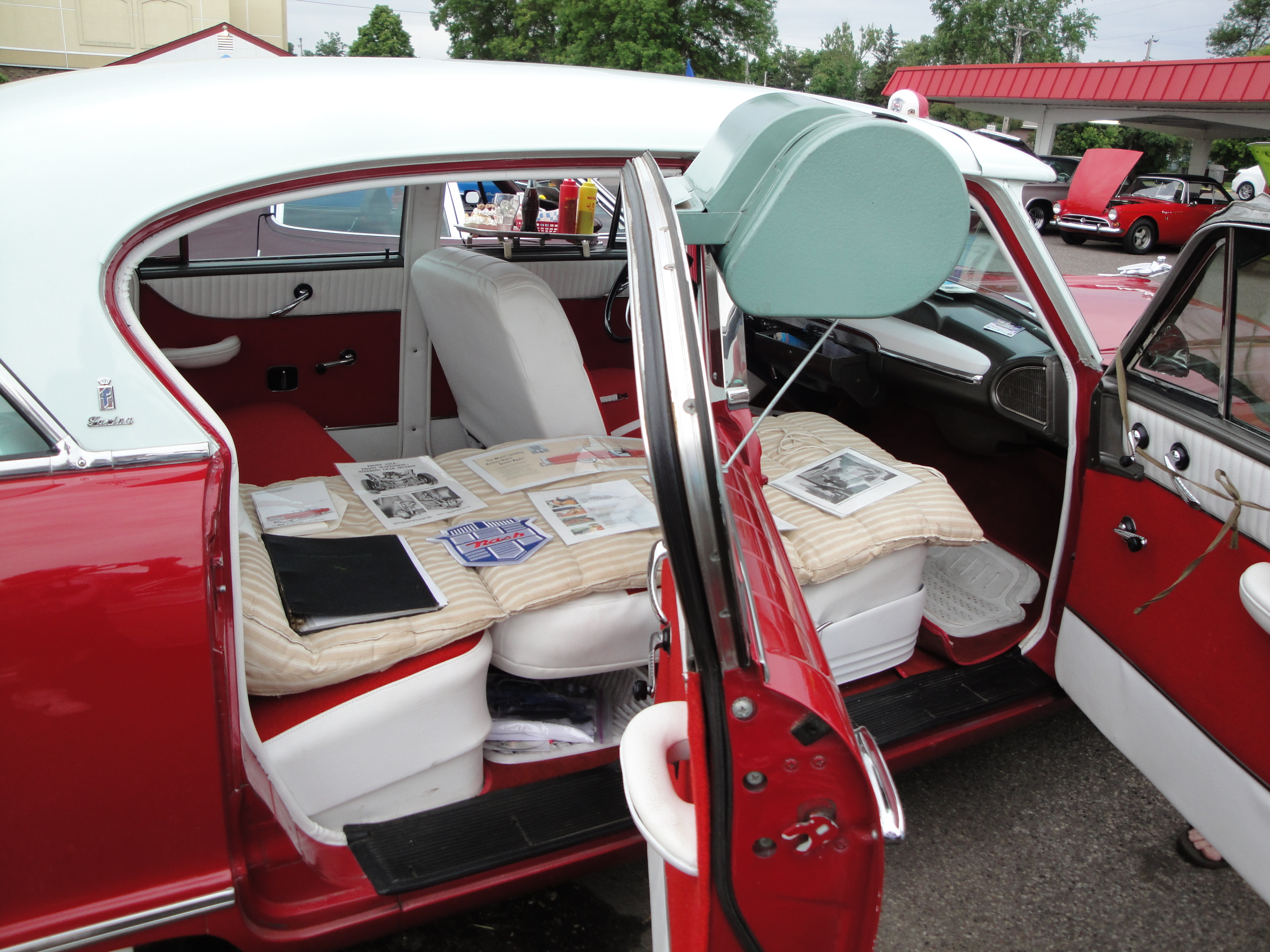
Fully reclining front seat backs to form a bed in a 1954 Nash Ambassador

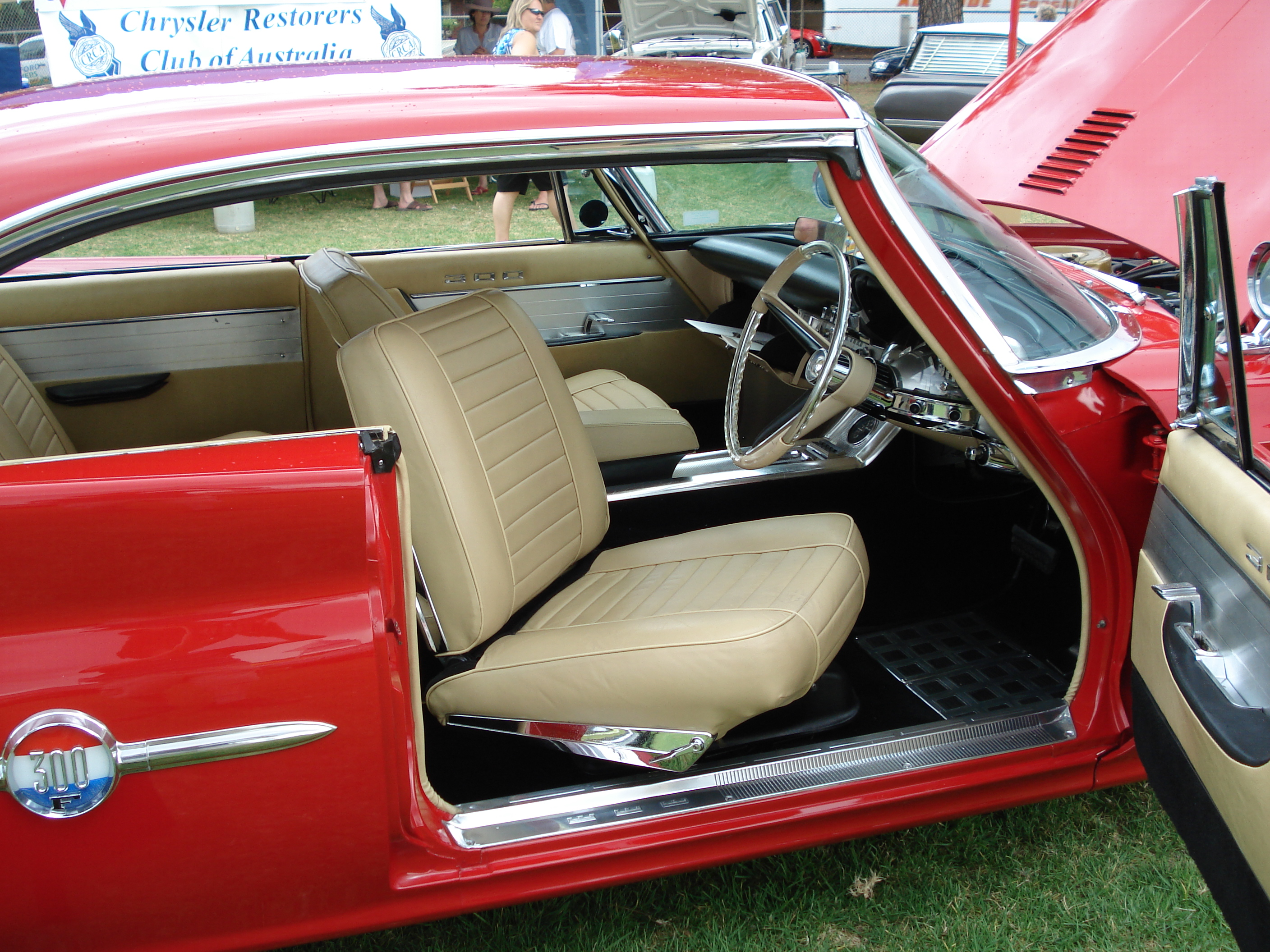
Swiveling front seats to ease entry and exit in a 1960 Chrysler 300F

== Climate control and ventilation ==
Some vehicles includes the option of seat climate control (i.e. heating by seat warmers or cooling) and ventilation. Ventilation was introduced in 1997 by Saab and heating by Cadillac in 1966. In 2023 BMW pulled out of a plan to implement a subscription model on their heated seats due to public backlash.

== See also ==
- Armrest
- Cushion
- Ergonomics
- Folding seat
- Headrest
- List of chairs
- Lumbar
- Massage chair
- Seat belt
- Sheepskin seat cover
- Shock-mitigating suspension seats
- Turning seat
- Upholstery
