= Shock-mitigating suspension seats =

Shock-mitigating suspension seats are designed to reduce the severity of vibration and mechanical shock. These seats are used in vehicles that operate in high exposure environments, such as high-speed watercraft, military platforms, construction, forestry and agricultural vehicles, and industrial trucks (such as fork lifts). A vehicle's collisions with waves or rough terrain are a source of whole body vibration that may cause discomfort, acute injuries, and chronic pain among operators. The marine environment is particularly severe and people exposed to these conditions may experience unusually high injury rates.

Shock-mitigating suspension seats are related to the blast seats used to protect personnel from IEDs in armored vehicles and the crash seats used in military helicopters. Unlike these other seats, however, shock-mitigating suspension seats must be designed to survive and retain their functionality for many thousands of impacts. The prevalence of their use in the marine industry, where the seats are exposed to the elements including extreme temperature ranges and the presence of sea-water, is another distinguishing feature that guides the design of shock-mitigating suspension seats.

== General description ==
In its simplest form, a shock-mitigating suspension seat consists of a seating surface attached to a vertically mounted suspension unit supported by an accompanying structural frame. Application-dependent features such as armrests, control mounts, and adjustment mechanisms are common.

=== Seating surface ===
The seating surface is typically composed of a rigid seat pan topped with an upholstered foam cushion. The primary function of the cushion is to provide comfort, and this is achieved by spreading the pressure distribution across the occupant's body, reducing concentrations of pressure.

=== The Suspension module ===
Airsprings, coil-over springs, and leaf-springs are commonly used to provide a restoring force for suspension seats. Motion is attenuated and impact energy is dissipated as heat in a damping chamber that is coupled with the spring mechanism. This combination is intended to enable the seats to reduce impact severity and return to their equilibrium position.

Though it is the most common configuration, the axis of travel of the shock-absorber need not be parallel to the axis of travel of the seat surface, and it need not be fixed over the course of its stroke. In such cases the transfer of forces from the deck to the seat is achieved through one or more linkage members. The suspension module may be of custom design or adapted from the shock-absorbing isolators used in off-road vehicles, trucks, or mountain bikes. Weight restrictions, space limitations, and rider sight-line requirements determine the physical characteristics of the suspension. In the marine environment, additional emphasis on ruggedization is required to protect the suspension from corrosion.

== Performance measurement ==
Pioneering work on seat assessment was conducted by the ejection seating industry (see the article on ejector seats and the references therein). The dynamic response index (DRI) has played an important role in the area. Development of seating test codes for other industries has also taken place. The general approach of these standards is that vehicles are classed by relevant characteristics such as general type, size/mass, and drive system (tracked, wheeled), and an example motion representative of each class is specified. Seats may be tested against one or more classes and are required to demonstrate that they can usefully reduce the vibration exposure with different weights of seat occupant.

There are significant challenges to measuring marine seats at sea, including variable weather conditions, boat availability, operating costs, and personnel safety. Standards for assessing marine seats in representative laboratory conditions, similar to the approach used for the agricultural, industrial truck and heavy plan sectors, are starting to emerge, driven by requirements from major fleet operators. The UK's Ministry of Defense has engaged in comprehensive seat performance measurement, and the first performance standardized test method for marine seating was published by the US Navy following collaborative work from fleet operators in the US, UK, and Canada.

All standards use some form of metric to relate vibration and shock exposure to risk of injury. Assessing seat performance in terms of simple peak accelerations is not viable without accounting for the likely effects of the frequency content, amplitude, duration, and other aspects of the motion on the human body. Most suspension seat performance assessment methods use either the human response to vibration assessment methods set out in ISO 2631-1, although the US Navy marine seat standard effectively uses the DRI (with only a slight modification to the natural frequency of the single-degree-of-freedom model) developed for assessment of blast or ejection seats.

A number of factors are known to influence shock-mitigating suspension seat performance. These factors include occupant mass, impact severity, seat travel/stroke length, damping characteristics, and spring rate. Depending on the application and seat configuration, performance may vary significantly across occupant masses within the user demographic. The performance variation is a consequence of the large occupant mass range that must be accommodated. The Naval Surface Warfare Center, for instance, prescribes test masses ranging from 49 to 112 kg.

== Legislation ==
Mechanical shock (whole-body vibration) exposure has been recognized as a health hazard, and in its 2002 vibration directive 2002/44/EC the European Union set strict exposure limits in an effort to protect its workforce. The directive applies to all member nations and defines daily weighted exposure limits (normalized to 8 hours) using the methods defined in ISO 2631-1.

The UK transposed the vibration directive into its own national legislation with the Control of Vibrations at Work Regulations and the Merchant Shipping and Fishing Vessel Control of Vibrations at Work regulations. Both of these regulations define the same exposure limits and have since been applied in major procurements for shock-mitigation in the Royal Navy's fleet.
