= Anastase =

Anastase is a masculine given name derived from the Ancient Greek name Anastasíā. It may refer to:

== Given names ==
- Anastase Alfieri (1892–1971), Italian entomologist
- Anastase Dragomir (1896–1966), Romanian inventor
- Anastase Gasana (born 1950), Rwandan diplomat
- Anastase-Marie al-Karmali (1866–1947), Iraqi Catholic priest and Discalced Carmelite friar, lexicologist and lexicographer of the Arabic language, philologist, periodical editor
- Anastase Murekezi (born 1952), Rwandan politician
- Anastase Shyaka, Rwandan academic and politician
- Anastase Simu (1854–1935), Romanian art collector
- Anastase Stolojan (1836–1901), Romanian politician

== Middle names ==
- Henri Joseph Anastase Perrotin (1845–1904), French astronomer

== Surnames ==
- Roberta Anastase (born 1976), Romanian politician

== See also ==
- Anastasie
