= 2005 Sepang A1GP round =

2005-06 A1GP of Malaysia

Race Details
- Race 5 of 11 in the 2005-06 A1 Grand Prix season
- Date: November 20, 2005
- Location: Sepang International Circuit; Sepang, Malaysia
- Weather: Fine

Qualifying
- Pole: Switzerland (Neel Jani)
- Time: 3'48.962 (1'54.441, 1'54.521)

Sprint Race
- 1st: France (Alexandre Premat)
- 2nd: Switzerland (Neel Jani)
- 3rd: Great Britain (Robbie Kerr)

Main Race
- 1st: France (Alexandre Premat)
- 2nd: Switzerland (Neel Jani)
- 3rd: Czech Republic (Tomáš Enge)

Fast Lap
- FL: France (Alexandre Premat)
- Time: 1'55.373, (Lap 5 of Sprint Race)

Official Classifications
- Prac1 ·Prac2 ·Prac3 ·Qual ·SRace ·MRace

Layout of the Sepang International Circuit

The 2005–06 A1 Grand Prix of Nations, Malaysia was an A1 Grand Prix race, held on the weekend of November 20, 2005 at the Sepang International Circuit.

== Results ==
=== Qualification ===
Qualification took place on Saturday, November 19, 2005, with rain beginning in earnest at the end of the second segment of qualification.

Pos	Team	Driver	Q1 Time	Q2 Time	Q3 Time	Q4 Time	Aggregate	Gap
1	Switzerland	Neel Jani	1'54.441	1'54.521	--	2'20.934	3'48.962	--
2	France	Alexandre Premat	1'54.580	1'55.288	--	2'18.569	3'49.868	0.906
3	(Republic of Ireland) Ireland	Ralph Firman	1'55.234	1'54.735	--	2'18.851	3'49.969	1.007
4	(United Kingdom) Great Britain	Robbie Kerr	1'54.963	1'55.009	--	--	3'49.972	1.01
5	New Zealand	Matt Halliday	1'55.149	1'55.420	--	2'33.811	3'50.569	1.607
6	Netherlands	Jos Verstappen	1'55.822	1'55.214	--	2'18.874	3'51.036	2.074
7	Malaysia	Alex Yoong	1'55.736	1'55.463	--	2'18.612	3'51.199	2.237
8	Brazil	Nelson Piquet Jr.	1'55.195	1'56.203	--	2'18.293	3'51.398	2.436
9	Portugal	Alvaro Parente	1'55.327	1'56.220	--	--	3'51.547	2.585
10	Italy	Enrico Toccacelo	1'54.799	1'57.095	--	2'19.887	3'51.894	2.932
11	Indonesia	Ananda Mikola	1'55.861	1'56.135	--	2'17.682	3'51.996	3.034
12	(United States) USA	Bryan Herta	1'54.970	1'57.043	--	2'21.285	3'52.013	3.051
13	South Africa	Stephen Simpson	1'55.436	1'56.682	--	2'22.503	3'52.118	3.156
14	Pakistan	Adam Khan	1'55.398	1'56.802	--	--	3'52.200	3.238
15	India	Armaan Ebrahim	1'55.620	1'57.209	--	--	3'52.829	3.867
16	Germany	Timo Scheider	1'55.067	1'58.200	--	--	3'53.267	4.305
17	Mexico	Luis Diaz	1'55.775	1'57.881	2'52.825	2'22.400	3'53.656	4.694
18	Czech Republic	Tomáš Enge	1'56.270	1'57.496	2'34.244	2'19.478	3'53.766	4.804
19	Japan	Hayanari Shimoda	1'56.074	1'57.874	--	2'24.564	3'53.948	4.986
20	Austria	Mathias Lauda	1'56.209	1'58.780	--	2'24.028	3'54.989	6.027
21	China	Tengyi Jiang	1'56.947	1'59.100	--	--	3'56.047	7.085
22	Canada	Sean McIntosh	1'55.357	2'05.040	--	2'21.232	4'00.397	11.435
23	Lebanon	Khalil Beschir	1'56.541	--	2'21.118	2'27.605	4'17.659	28.697
24	Australia	Will Davison	1'55.378	--	--	2'22.482	4'17.860	28.898

=== Sprint Race Results ===
The Sprint Race took place on Sunday, November 20, 2005.

Pos	Team	Driver	Laps	Time	Points
1	France	Alexandre Premat	15	29:21.541	10
2	Switzerland	Neel Jani	15	+1.231	9
3	(United Kingdom) Great Britain	Robbie Kerr	15	+5.065	8
4	Brazil	Nelson Piquet Jr.	15	+6.793	7
5	Netherlands	Jos Verstappen	15	+7.973	6
6	New Zealand	Matt Halliday	15	+13.162	5
7	(Republic of Ireland) Ireland	Ralph Firman	15	+13.882	4
8	Malaysia	Fairuz Fauzy	15	+15.782	3
9	Portugal	Alvaro Parente	15	+20.391	2
10	(United States) USA	Bryan Herta	15	+20.845	1
11	India	Armaan Ebrahim	15	+21.394	
12	Germany	Timo Scheider	15	+23.107	
13	Pakistan	Adam Khan	15	+25.214	
14	Japan	Hayanari Shimoda	15	+26.247	
15	Canada	Sean McIntosh	15	+27.408	
16	Czech Republic	Tomáš Enge	15	+30.010	
17	Italy	Enrico Toccacelo	15	+31.171	
18	Austria	Mathias Lauda	15	+31.638	
19	Mexico	Luis Diaz	15	+34.371	
20	China	Tengyi Jiang	15	+37.081	
21	South Africa	Stephen Simpson	9	+6 Laps	
22	Lebanon	Khalil Beschir	9	+6 Laps	
23	Indonesia	Ananda Mikola	5	+10 Laps	
24	Australia	Will Davison	4	+11 Laps	

=== Main Race Results ===
The Main Race took place on Sunday, November 20, 2005.

Pos	Team	Driver	Laps	Time	Points
1	France	Alexandre Premat	30	1:00:06.495	10
2	Switzerland	Neel Jani	30	+4.556	9
3	Czech Republic	Tomáš Enge	30	+15.689	8
4	Italy	Enrico Toccacelo	30	+23.738	7
5	Malaysia	Alex Yoong	30	+31.641	6
6	New Zealand	Matt Halliday	30	+32.697	5
7	(United States) USA	Bryan Herta	30	+33.337	4
8	Germany	Timo Scheider	30	+35.381	3
9	(Republic of Ireland) Ireland	Ralph Firman	30	+35.745	2
10	Brazil	Nelson Piquet Jr.	30	+39.388	1
11	Australia	Will Davison	30	+50.483	
12	South Africa	Stephen Simpson	30	+51.839	
13	Japan	Hayanari Shimoda	30	+57.748	
14	Indonesia	Ananda Mikola	30	+1'05.239	
15	Mexico	Luis Diaz	30	+1'22.440	
16	Netherlands	Jos Verstappen	30	+1'47.308	
17	Lebanon	Khalil Beschir	29	+1 Lap	
18	Portugal	Alvaro Parente	29	+1 Lap	
19	Canada	Sean McIntosh	21	+9 Laps	
20	(United Kingdom) Great Britain	Robbie Kerr	20	+10 Laps	
21	Austria	Mathias Lauda	17	+13 Laps	
22	Pakistan	Adam Khan	4	+26 Laps	
23	China	Tengyi Jiang	1	+29 Laps	
Excluded
24	India	Armaan Ebrahim	11		

=== Total Points ===
Team	Points	SR	MR	FL
France	21	10	10	1
Switzerland	18	9	9	--
New Zealand	10	5	5	--
Malaysia	9	3	6	--
Brazil	8	7	1	--
Czech Republic	8	--	8	--
(United Kingdom) Great Britain	8	8	--	--
Italy	7	--	7	--
(Republic of Ireland) Ireland	6	4	2	--
Netherlands	6	6	--	--
(United States) USA	5	1	4	--
Germany	3	--	3	--
Portugal	2	2	--	--

- Fastest Lap: A1 Team France (1'55.373 / 172.9 km/h, lap 5 of Sprint Race)
- A1 Team India was excluded from the Feature Race, after receiving a push start from the marshals.
