= Anastasie =

Anastasie is a French feminine name derived from the Ancient Greek name Anastasia. Notable people with this name include the following:

- Anastasie Brown (1826–1918), American nun
- Anastasie Crimca (c. 1550 – 1629), Romanian clergyman, calligrapher, illuminator, and writer
- Anastasie Fătu (1816–1886), Romanian physician, naturalist, philanthropist, and political figure
- Anastasie Panu (1810–1867), Moldavian–Romanian politician
- Mother Marie-Anastasie (1833–1878), French nun

== See also ==
- Anastase
- Anastasi (surname)
- Anastasia
