= Khalil Beschir =

Lebanese racing driver

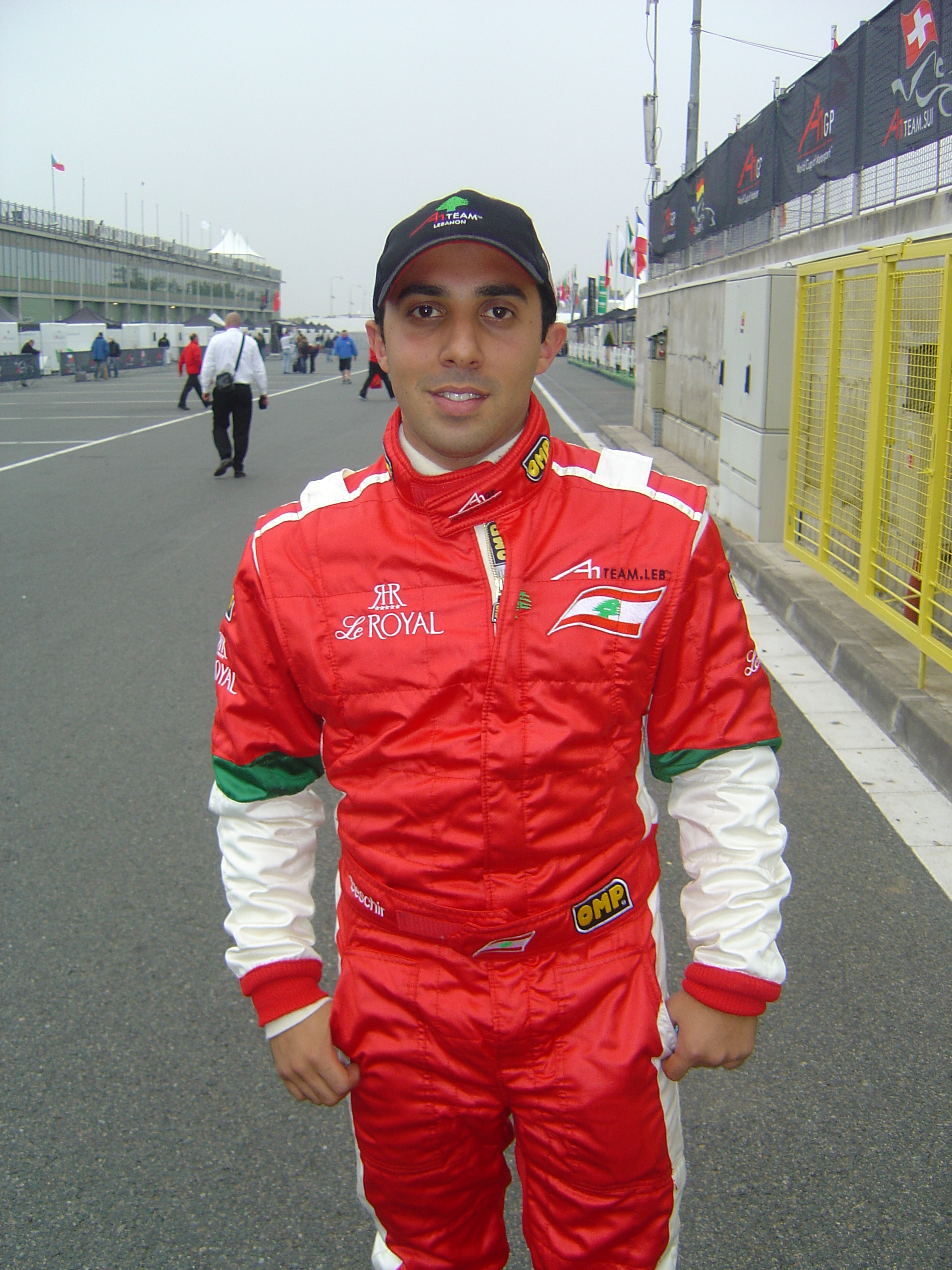
- Born: June 18, 1982 (age 44); Bhersaf, Lebanon

Khalil Beschir (born 18 June 1982) is a Lebanese former racing driver turned manager, commentator, and motorsport entrepreneur. He was the first Arab racing driver to compete in a single-seater world championship. From 2005 to 2008, he raced for Lebanon in the A1 Grand Prix series.

After retiring from racing, Beschir was a pundit for BeIN Sports and the F1 commentator for the Saudi channel MBC. More recently, he has been the manager for Mexican driver Sergio Pérez, helping to engineer his return to Formula One racing with the Cadillac Formula One team.

== Early life and training ==
Beschir was born in Bhersaf, Lebanon. He enrolled at a racing school in Magny Cours, France in 2001.

== Racing career ==
Beschir started his racing career in karting.

In 2004, Beschir made his professional racing debut at Belgium's Circuit Zolder, finishing in the top 10 after competing against the cream of Europe's single-seater talent.

With money scarce, Beschir sold his car and began working as a race team mechanic in Belgium to gain more testing mileage and to pull together the budget for further race outings. In his third race, at Belgium's Spa-Francorchamps, a problem in qualifying relegated him to 42nd on the grid – but an outstanding comeback drive saw him climb back to sixth position, earning fastest lap in the process.

Those early performances caught the eye of acclaimed motorsport manager Rick Gorne, who offered to manage Beschir and run him in Formula 1 team BAR-Honda's Drivers' Programme. However, lacking financial backing, he eventually migrated to the nascent A1 Grand Prix series, earning the Lebanese race-seat for the 2005-06 season after a shoot-out against five other drivers.

In preparation for his A1GP debut, Beschir competed in the Italian Formula 3 Championship, finishing just outside the top-ten; and in selected rounds of the European F3000 series, where he finished a creditable 13th overall despite contesting less than half the rounds.

== A1 Grand Prix ==
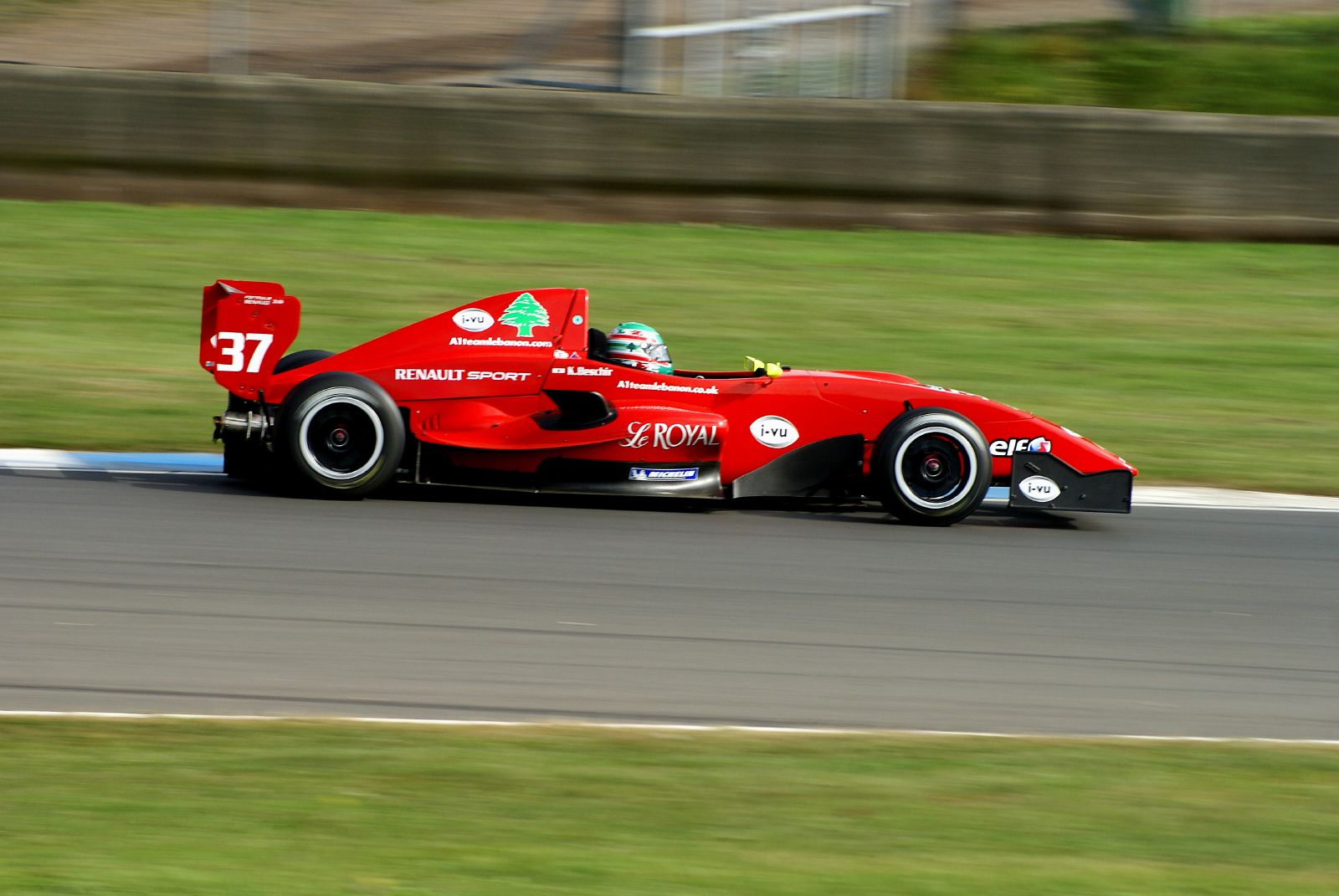
Beschir driving in the Eurocup Formula Renault 2.0 in 2007.

In late 2005, Beschir's entry into the A1 Grand Prix series made him the first Arab driver to ever contest a round of an international single-seater world championship. That first race was inauspicious – he was rolled out of seventh position at Paddock Hill Bend when he was collected by A1 Team Italy's Enrico Toccacelo. He spent three seasons in A1GP, earning a best-ever finish of eighth place, at the Durban in 2008 which made him the first driver to score for the team. Beschir was one of only three drivers from A1GP to win an award in 2006; he won the award for "Most Extensive Product Testing".

== Formula 1 commentary and analysis ==
Khalil began his broadcasting career in 2010, when he became Abu Dhabi TV's F1 and motorsport pundit. The broadcaster was the exclusive TV rights-holder for F1, GP2 and GP3 in 24 Arab countries.

When the broadcasting rights transferred to Arab sports network beIN Sports in 2014, Beschir was quickly rewarded with a multi-year deal as the network's F1 analyst. As a commentator, he is able to draw upon his extensive single-seater experience, taking viewers into the cockpit as the sport continues to grow in popularity across the Middle East.

In 2019, Beschir was confirmed as co-commentator and analyst for MBC Action's Formula 1 coverage in the MENA region.

Between 2019 and 2023, Beschir, in collaboration with MBC Group, played a pivotal role in increasing the popularity of the Formula 1 championship in the Middle East and North Africa. Their efforts significantly grew awareness and expanded the audience in the region, particularly among the young fanbase.

== Business links within motorsport ==
Beschir has used his personal experiences to help develop and grow interest in motorsport throughout the Arab world. He has worked with the FIA to help grow education in motorsport and develop young drivers and motorsport programs across the MENA region, where he has helped expand this national scheme into a larger, global programme.

Currently, Beschir is working with multiple governments and entities on motorsport development programmes and collaborating closely with several drivers and teams in the world of Formula 1 and Motorsport.

In 2015, Beschir was listed as one of the top 100 most powerful Arabs under 40, in a report published by Arabian Business.

== Management of Sergio Pérez ==
In June 2025, Formula 1 driver Sergio Pérez announced that Khalil Beschir had been his manager since December 2024, following his departure from the Red Bull Formula 1 team. Working closely together to engineer Pérez’s return to the grid, their efforts paid off just two months later: in August 2025, it was officially confirmed that Pérez would make his Formula 1 comeback with the newly formed Cadillac Formula 1 Team.

== Racing record ==
=== 3000 Pro Series ===
Season	VAL (Italy)	IMO (Italy)	SPA (Belgium)	MUG (Italy)	MIS (Italy)	LAU (Germany)	ADR (Italy)	MON (Italy)	Pts	Pos
2005		12	9	12	Ret	5			4	13th

=== A1 Grand Prix results ===
(key) (Races in bold indicate pole position) (Races in italics indicate fastest lap)

Year	Entrant	1	2	3	4	5	6	7	8	9	10	11	12	13	14	15	16	17	18	19	20	21	22	DC	Points
2005–06	Lebanon	GBR; SPR; 22	GBR; FEA; Ret	GER; SPR; Ret	GER; FEA; 18	POR; SPR	POR; FEA	AUS; SPR	AUS; FEA	MYS; SPR; Ret	MYS; FEA; 17	UAE; SPR	UAE; FEA	RSA; SPR	RSA; FEA	IDN; SPR	IDN; FEA	MEX; SPR	MEX; FEA	USA; SPR	USA; FEA	CHN; SPR	CHN; FEA	**23rd**	**0**
2006–07	Lebanon	NED; SPR	NED; FEA	CZE; SPR	CZE; FEA	CHN; SPR	CHN; FEA	MYS; SPR; 17	MYS; FEA; 20	IDN; SPR	IDN; FEA	NZL; SPR	NZL; FEA	AUS; SPR	AUS; FEA	RSA; SPR	RSA; FEA	MEX; SPR	MEX; FEA	CHN; SPR	CHN; FEA	GBR; SPR	GBR; SPR	**23rd**	**0**
2007–08	Lebanon	NED; SPR	NED; FEA	CZE; SPR; 20	CZE; FEA; 21	MYS; SPR	MYS; FEA	CHN; SPR	CHN; FEA	NZL; SPR	NZL; FEA	AUS; SPR	AUS; FEA	RSA; SPR; 19	RSA; FEA; 08	MEX; SPR	MEX; FEA	CHN; SPR	CHN; FEA	GBR; SPR; 22	GBR; SPR; 18			**22nd**	**3**

=== Complete Eurocup Formula Renault 2.0 results ===
(key) (Races in bold indicate pole position; races in italics indicate fastest lap)

Year	Entrant	1	2	3	4	5	6	7	8	9	10	11	12	13	14	DC	Points
2007	Carlin Motorsport	ZOL; 1	ZOL; 2	NÜR; 1	NÜR; 2	HUN; 1	HUN; 2	DON; 1; 26	DON; 2 Ret	MAG; 1	MAG; 2	EST; 1	EST; 2	CAT; 1	CAT; 2	48th	0
