= Lughat al-Arab =

Monthly linguistic magazine in Baghdad (1911–1914)

- Categories: Linguistic magazine; History magazine
- Frequency: Monthly
- Founder: Anastase-Marie al-Karmali
- Founded: 1911
- Final issue: 1931
- Country: Iraq
- Based in: Baghdad
- Language: Arabic

Lughat al-Arab (Arabic: لغة العرب ALA-LC: Lughat al-ʻArab, lit. 'The Language of the Arabs') was a monthly linguistic and history magazine which was published in Baghdad between 1911 and 1931 with a twelve-year interruption.

== History and profile ==
Lughat al-Arab was launched by the Carmelite father Anastase-Marie al-Karmali in Baghdad in 1911. It was published in Baghdad on a monthly basis. The magazine featured articles on language, history, literature and science. In the first issue the goal of Lughat al-Arab was stated as follows:

to serve the homeland, knowledge, and literature, familiarising Iraq and its people with the neighbouring countries and the writings of Western scholars, and giving Iraq a recognised place among civilised nations.

Al-Karmali edited the magazine. The last issue appeared in June 1914. Al-Karmali was sent to exile in Anatolia in 1916, and following his return to Baghdad Lughat al-Arab was restarted in 1926. The magazine permanently folded in 1931. In this second period Kazim al-Dujayli and Iraqi linguist and historian Muhammad Bahjat Athari were among the contributors of Lughat al-Arab.

Each issue of Lughat al-Arab published during its first phase was archived under the OpenArabicPE's Corpus.
