= Ejection seat =

Emergency aircraft escape system

External image
- Martin Baker Mk 1 ejection seat drawing
- Martin Baker Mk 1 ejection seat drawing by Flight Global

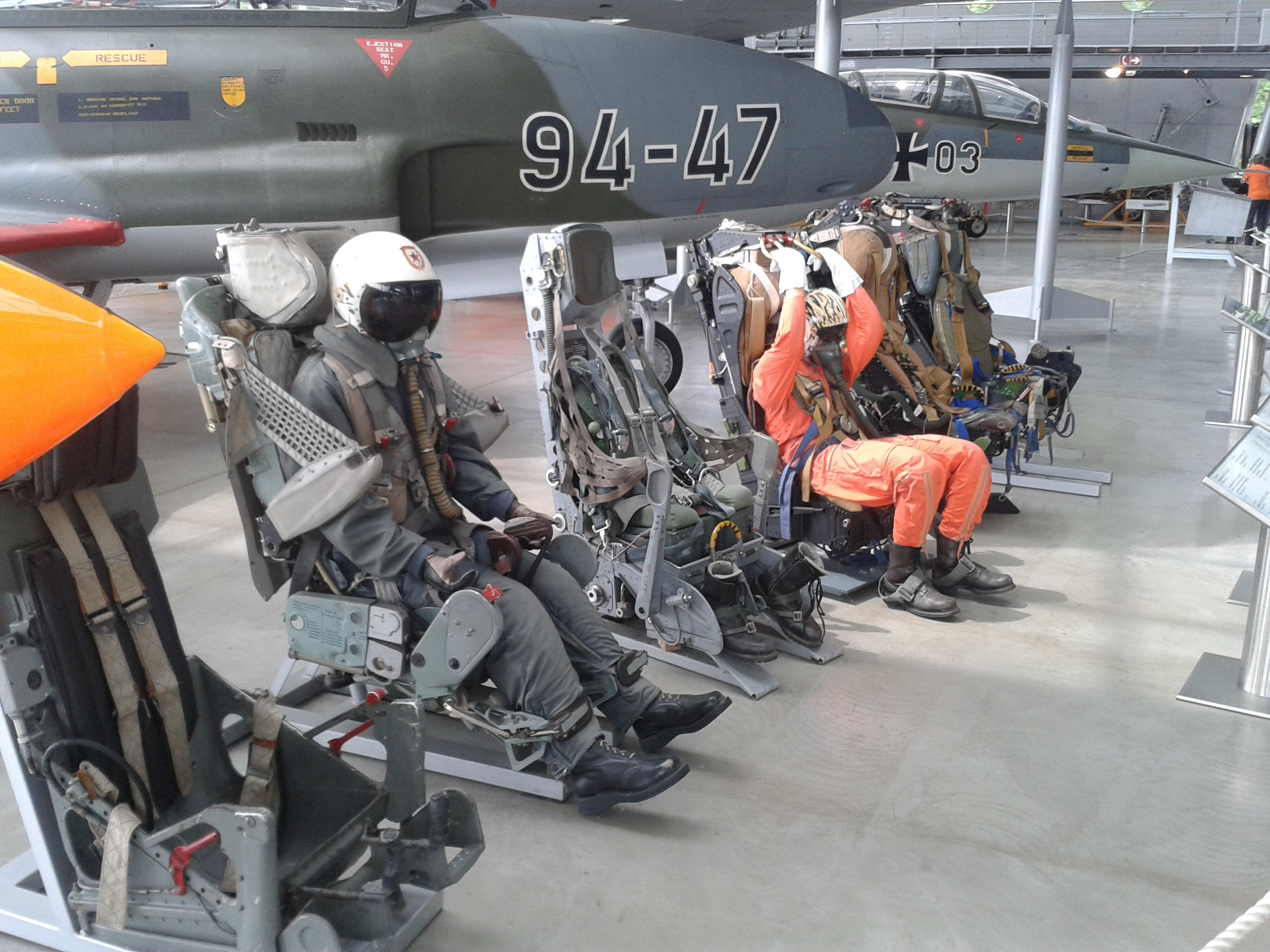
Various ejection seats

In aircraft, an ejection seat or ejector seat is a system designed to rescue the pilot or other crew of an aircraft (usually military) in an emergency. In most designs, the seat is propelled out of the aircraft by an explosive charge or rocket motor, carrying the pilot with it. The concept of an ejectable escape crew capsule has also been tried (see B-58 Hustler). Once clear of the aircraft, the ejection seat deploys a parachute. Ejection seats are common on certain types of military aircraft.

== History ==
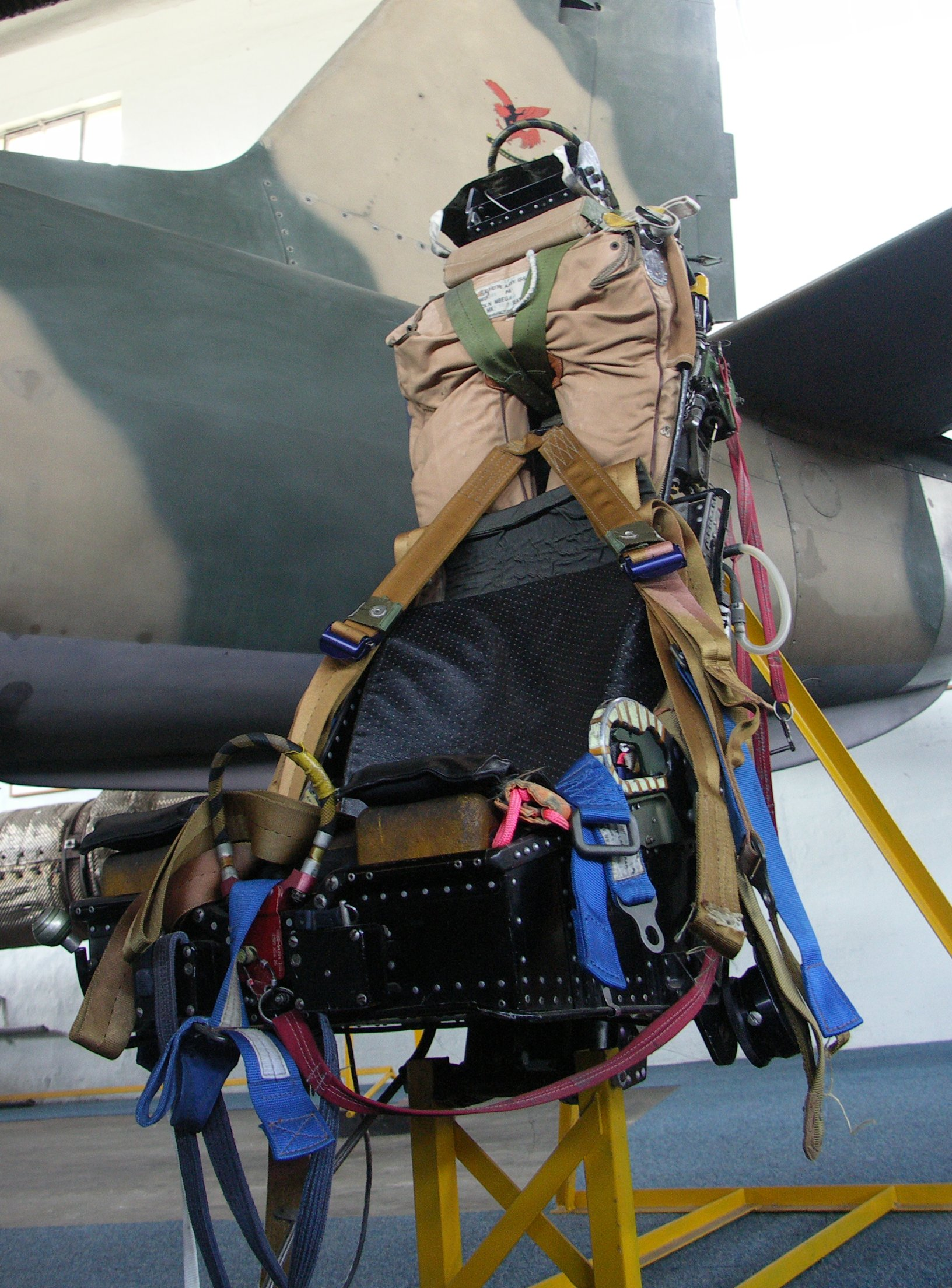
Martin-Baker WY6AM ejection seat.

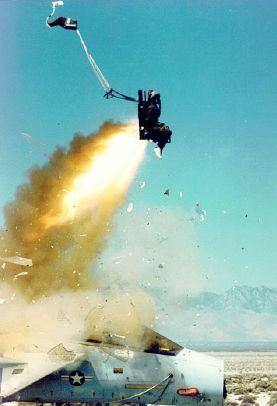
United States Air Force F-15 Eagle ejection seat test using a crash test dummy.

A bungee-assisted escape from an aircraft took place in 1910. In 1916, Everard Calthrop, an early inventor of parachutes, patented an ejector seat using compressed air.

The modern layout for an ejection seat was first introduced by Romanian inventor Anastase Dragomir in the late 1920s. The design featured a parachuted cell (a dischargeable chair from an aircraft or other vehicle). It was successfully tested on 25 August 1929 at the Paris-Orly Airport near Paris and in October 1929 at Băneasa, near Bucharest. Dragomir patented his "catapult-able cockpit" at the French Patent Office. (Note: Patent no. 678566, of April 2, 1930, Nouveau système de montage des parachutes dans les appareils de locomotion aérienne)

The design was perfected during World War II. Prior to this, the only means of escape from an incapacitated aircraft was to jump clear ("bail out"), and in many cases this was difficult due to injury, the difficulty of egress from a confined space, g forces, the airflow past the aircraft, and other factors.

The first ejection seats were developed independently during World War II by Heinkel and SAAB. Early models were powered by compressed air and the first aircraft to be fitted with such a system was the Heinkel He 280 prototype jet-engined fighter in 1940. One of the He 280 test pilots, Helmut Schenk, became the first person to escape from a stricken aircraft with an ejection seat on 13 January 1942 after his control surfaces iced up and became inoperative. The fighter was being used in tests of the Argus As 014 impulse jets for V-1 flying bomb development. It had its usual Heinkel HeS 8A turbojets removed, and was towed aloft from the Erprobungsstelle Rechlin central test facility of the Luftwaffe in Germany by a pair of Messerschmitt Bf 110C tugs in a heavy snow-shower. At 7,900 ft (2,400 m), Schenk found he had no control, jettisoned his towline, and ejected. The He 280 was never put into production status. The first operational type built anywhere to provide ejection seats for the crew was the Heinkel He 219 Uhu night fighter in 1942.

In Sweden, a version using compressed air was tested in 1941. A gunpowder ejection seat was developed by Bofors and tested in 1943 for the Saab 21. The first test in the air was on a Saab 17 on 27 February 1944, and the first real use occurred by Lt. Bengt Johansson. (Note: He later changed his surname to Järkenstedt.) on 29 July 1946 after a mid-air collision between a J 21 and a J 22.

As the first operational military jet in late 1944 to ever feature one, the winner of the German Volksjäger "people's fighter" home defense jet fighter design competition; the lightweight Heinkel He 162A Spatz, featured a new type of ejection seat, this time fired by an explosive cartridge. In this system, the seat rode on wheels set between two pipes running up the back of the cockpit. When lowered into position, caps at the top of the seat fitted over the pipes to close them. Cartridges, basically identical to shotgun shells, were placed in the bottom of the pipes, facing upward. When fired, the gases would fill the pipes, "popping" the caps off the end, and thereby forcing the seat to ride up the pipes on its wheels and out of the aircraft. By the end of the war, the Dornier Do 335 Pfeil—primarily from it having a rear-mounted engine (of the twin engines powering the design) powering a pusher propeller located at the aft end of the fuselage presenting a hazard to a normal "bailout" escape—and a few late-war prototype aircraft were also fitted with ejection seats.

After World War II, the need for such systems became pressing, as aircraft speeds were getting ever higher, and it was not long before the sound barrier was broken. Manual escape at such speeds would be impossible. The United States Army Air Forces experimented with downward-ejecting systems operated by a spring, but it was the work of James Martin from Northern Ireland and his company Martin-Baker that proved crucial.

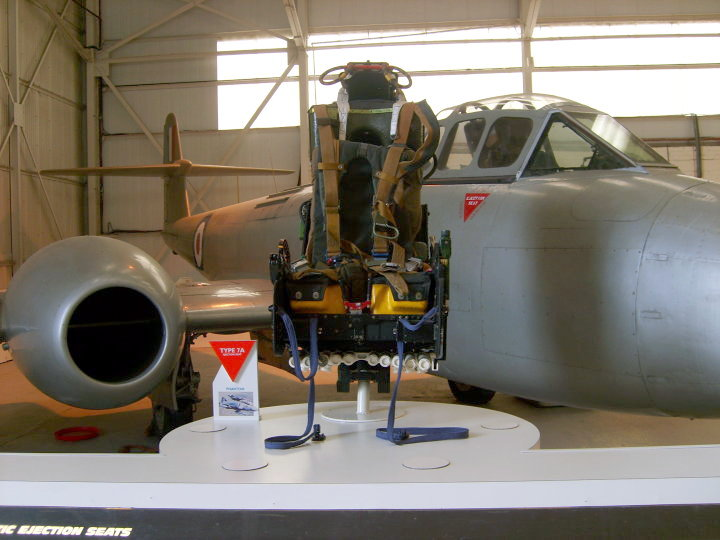
Martin-Baker Mk.7 seat on display at RAF Museum Cosford

The first live flight test of the Martin-Baker system took place on 24 July 1946, when fitter Bernard Lynch ejected from a Gloster Meteor Mk III jet. Shortly afterward, on 17 August 1946, Sgt. Larry Lambert was the first live US ejectee. Lynch demonstrated the ejection seat at the Daily Express Air Pageant in 1948, ejecting from a Meteor. Martin-Baker ejector seats were fitted to prototype and production aircraft from the late 1940s, and the first emergency use of such a seat occurred in 1949 during testing of the jet-powered Armstrong Whitworth A.W.52 experimental flying wing.

Early seats used a solid propellant charge to eject the pilot and seat by igniting the charge inside a telescoping tube attached to the seat. As aircraft speeds increased still further, this method proved inadequate to get the pilot sufficiently clear of the airframe. Increasing the amount of propellant risked damaging the occupant's spine, so experiments with rocket propulsion began. In 1958, the Convair F-102 Delta Dagger was the first aircraft to be fitted with a rocket-propelled seat. Martin-Baker developed a similar design, using multiple rocket units feeding a single nozzle. The greater thrust from this configuration had the advantage of being able to eject the pilot to a safe height even if the aircraft was on or very near the ground.

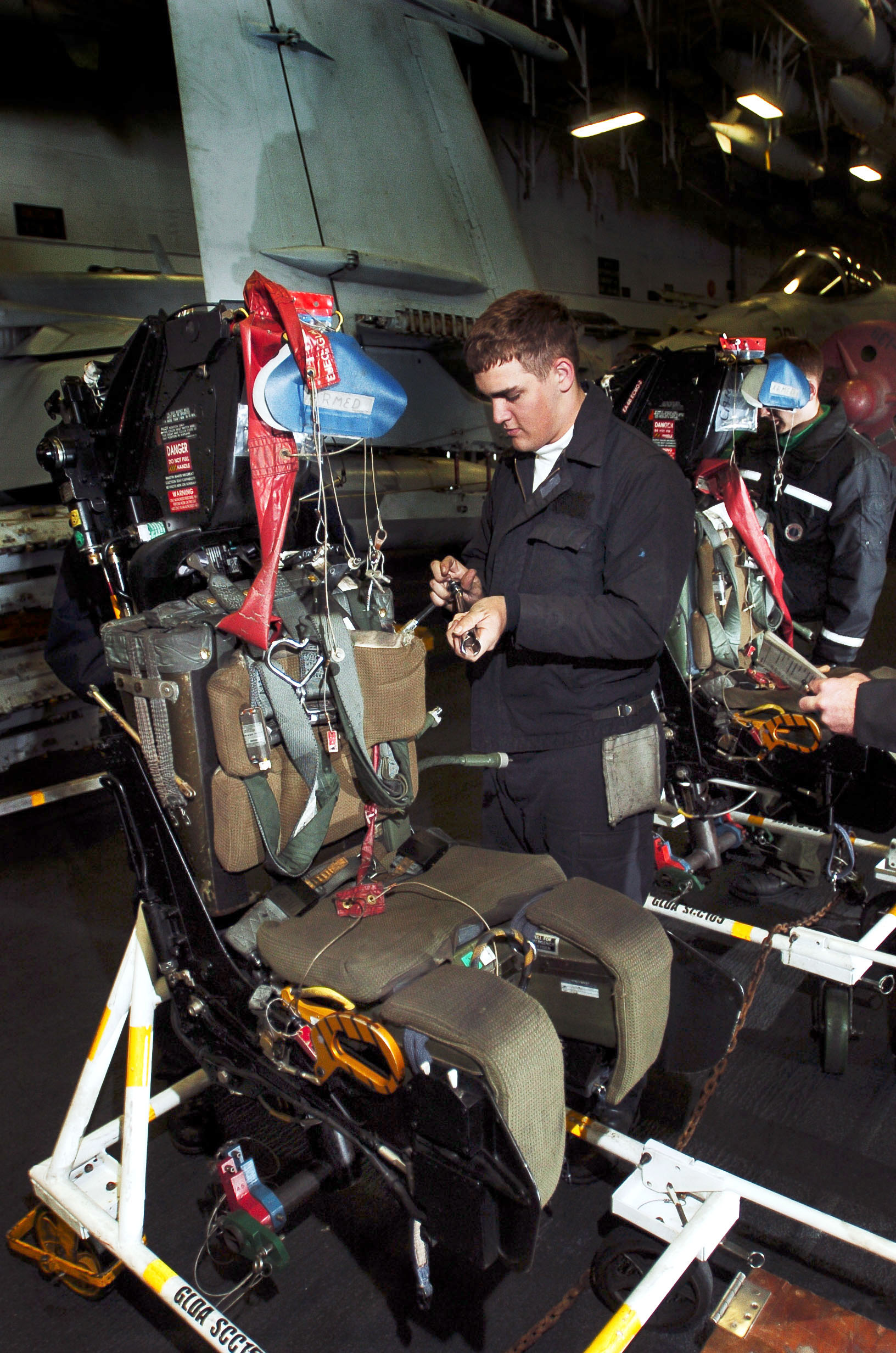
An aviation structural mechanic works on an Martin-Baker Mk.7 ejection seat removed from the cockpit of an EA-6B Prowler aboard USS John C. Stennis.

In the early 1960s, deployment of rocket-powered ejection seats designed for use at supersonic speeds began in such planes as the Convair F-106 Delta Dart. Six pilots have ejected at speeds exceeding 700 knots (1,300 km/h; 810 mph). The highest altitude at which a Martin-Baker seat was deployed was 57,000 ft (17,400 m) (from a Canberra bomber in 1958). Following an accident on 30 July 1966 in the attempted launch of a D-21 drone, two Lockheed M-21 crew members ejected at Mach 3.25 at an altitude of 80,000 ft (24,000 m). The pilot was recovered successfully, but the launch control officer drowned after a water landing. Despite these records, most ejections occur at fairly low speeds and altitudes, when the pilot can see that there is no hope of regaining aircraft control before impact with the ground.

Late in the Vietnam War, the US Air Force and US Navy became concerned about its pilots ejecting over hostile territory and those pilots either being captured or killed and the losses in men and aircraft in attempts to rescue them. Both services began a program titled Air Crew Escape/Rescue Capability or Aerial Escape and Rescue Capability (AERCAB) ejection seats (both terms have been used by the US military and defence industry), where after the pilot ejected, the ejection seat would fly them to a location far enough away from where they ejected to where they could safely be picked up. A Request for Proposals for concepts for AERCAB ejection seats were issued in the late 1960s. Three companies submitted papers for further development: A Rogallo wing design by Bell Systems; a gyrocopter design by Kaman Aircraft; and a mini-conventional fixed wing aircraft employing a Princeton wing (i.e. a wing made of flexible material that rolls out and then becomes rigid by means of internal struts or supports etc. deploying) by Fairchild Hiller. All three, after ejection, would be propelled by small turbojet engine developed for target drones. With the exception of the Kaman design, the pilot would still be required to parachute to the ground after reaching a safety-point for rescue. The AERCAB project was terminated in the 1970s with the end of the Vietnam War. The Kaman design, in early 1972, was the only one which was to reach the hardware stage. It came close to being tested with a special landing-gear platform attached to the AERCAB ejection seat for first-stage ground take offs and landings with a test pilot.

== Pilot safety ==
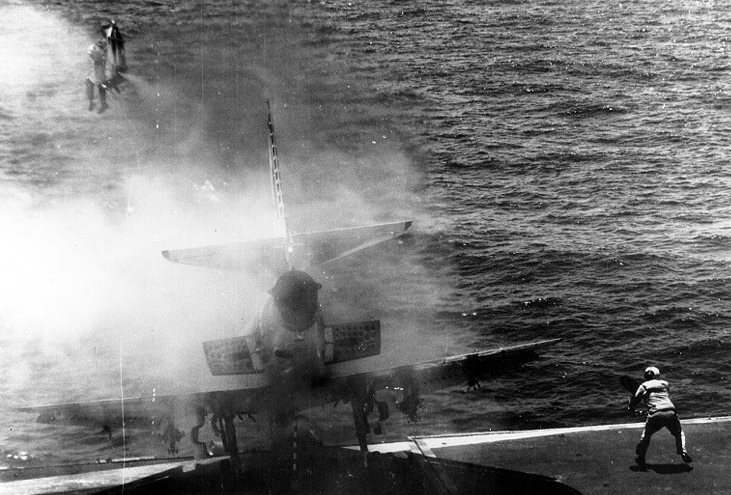
Lt. (j.g.) William Belden ejects from an A-4E Skyhawk as it rolls into the carrier's catwalk after a brake failure on the deck of the USS Shangri-La on 2 July 1970. The pilot was recovered by helicopter.

Pilot ejecting from A-6 Intruder after failed aircraft carrier landing

The purpose of an ejection seat is pilot survival. The pilot typically experiences an acceleration of about 12–14 g. Western seats usually impose lighter loads on the pilots; 1960s–70s era Soviet technology often goes up to 20–22 g (with SM-1 and KM-1 gunbarrel-type ejection seats). Compression fractures of vertebrae are a recurrent side effect of ejection.

It was theorised early on that ejection at supersonic speeds would be unsurvivable; extensive tests, including Project Whoosh with chimpanzee test subjects, were undertaken to determine that it was feasible.

The capabilities of the NPP Zvezda K-36 were unintentionally demonstrated at the Fairford Air Show on 24 July 1993 when the pilots of two MiG-29 fighters ejected after a mid-air collision.

The minimal ejection altitude for the ACES II seat in inverted flight is about 140 feet (40 m) above ground level at 150 knots (280 km/h; 170 mph), while the Russian counterpart, the K-36DM, has a minimal ejection altitude from inverted flight of 100 feet (30 m). When an aircraft is equipped with the NPP Zvezda K-36DM ejection seat and the pilot is wearing the КО-15 protective gear, they are able to eject at airspeeds from 0 to 760 knots (1,400 km/h; 870 mph) and altitudes of 0 to 82,000 ft (25,000 m). The K-36DM ejection seat features drag chutes and a small shield that rises between the pilot's legs to deflect air around the pilot.

Pilots have successfully ejected from underwater in a handful of instances after being forced to ditch in water. The first recorded case was Lieutenant B. D. Macfarlane of the Royal Navy Fleet Air Arm when he successfully ejected underwater using his Martin-Baker Mk.1 ejection seat after his Westland Wyvern had ditched on launch and been cut in two by the carrier on 13 October 1954. Documented evidence also exists that pilots of the US and Indian navies have also performed this feat.

As of 20 June 2011 – when two Spanish Air Force pilots ejected over San Javier airport – the number of lives saved by Martin-Baker products was 7,402 from 93 air forces. The company runs a club called the Ejection Tie Club and gives survivors a unique tie and lapel pin. In 2026, Martin-Baker claimed to have "saved over 7,700 lives" and that its club "now has over 6,000 registered members". The total figure for all types of ejection seats is unknown, but may be considerably higher.

Early models of the ejection seat were equipped with only an overhead ejection handle which doubled in function by forcing the pilot to assume the right posture and by having them pull a screen down to protect both their face and oxygen mask from the subsequent air blast. Martin Baker added a secondary handle in the front of the seat to allow ejection even when pilots were unable to reach upwards because of high g-force. Later (e.g., in Baker's MK9) the top handle was discarded because the lower handle had proven easier to operate and the technology of helmets had advanced to also protect from the air blast.

== Egress systems ==
A warning applied on the cockpit side of some aircraft using an ejection seat system intended especially for the maintenance and emergency crews

The "standard" ejection system operates in two stages. First, the entire canopy or hatch above the aviator is opened, shattered, or jettisoned, and the seat and occupant are launched through the opening. In most earlier aircraft this required two separate actions by the aviator, while later egress system designs, such as the Advanced Concept Ejection Seat model 2 (ACES II), perform both functions as a single action.

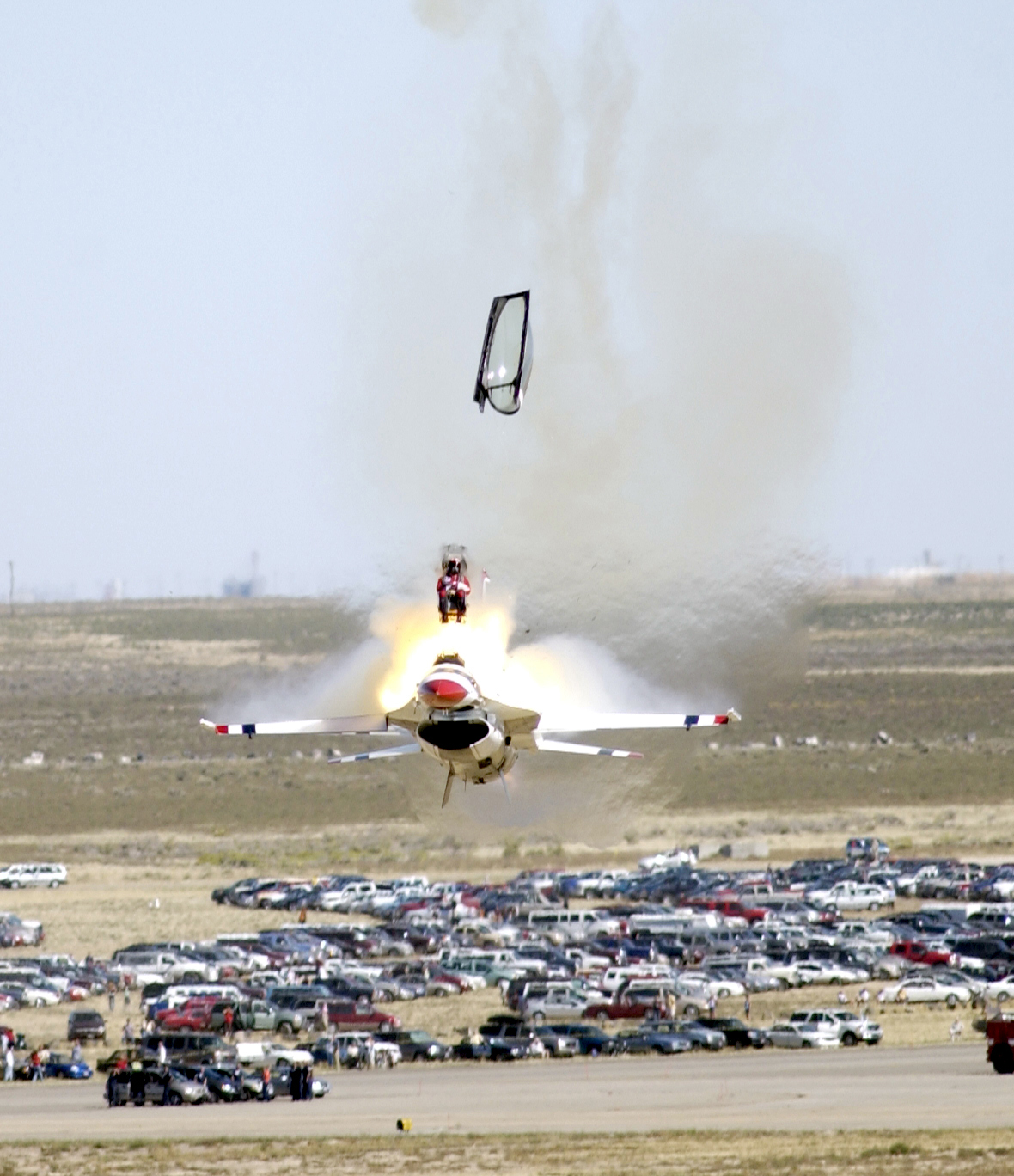
Capt. Christopher Stricklin ejects from his F-16 aircraft with an ACES II ejection seat on 14 September 2003 at Mountain Home AFB, Idaho. Stricklin was not injured.

The ACES II ejection seat is used in most American-built fighters. The A-10 uses connected firing handles that activate both the canopy jettison systems, followed by the seat ejection. The F-15 has the same connected system as the A-10 seat. Both handles accomplish the same task, so pulling either one suffices. The F-16 has only one handle located between the pilot's knees, since the cockpit is too narrow for side-mounted handles.

Non-standard egress systems include downward track (used for some crew positions in bomber aircraft, including the B-52 Stratofortress), canopy destruct (CD) and through-canopy penetration (TCP), drag extraction, encapsulated seat, and even crew capsule.

Early models of the F-104 Starfighter were equipped with a downward track ejection seat due to the hazard of the T-tail. In order to make this work, the pilot was equipped with "spurs" which were attached to cables that would pull the legs inward so the pilot could be ejected. Following this development, some other egress systems began using leg retractors as a way to prevent injuries to flailing legs, and to provide a more stable center of gravity. Some models of the F-104 were equipped with upward-ejecting seats.

Similarly, two of the six ejection seats on the B-52 Stratofortress fire downward, through hatch openings on the bottom of the aircraft; the downward hatches are released from the aircraft by a thruster that unlocks the hatch, while gravity and wind remove the hatch and arm the seat. The four seats on the forward upper deck (two of them, EWO and gunner, facing the rear of the airplane) fire upwards as usual. Any such downward-firing system is of no use on or near the ground if aircraft is in level flight at the time of the ejection.

Aircraft designed for low-level use sometimes have ejection seats which fire through the canopy, as waiting for the canopy to be ejected is too slow. Many aircraft types (e.g., the BAE Hawk and the Harrier line of aircraft) use canopy destruct systems, which have an explosive cord (MDC – miniature detonation cord or FLSC – flexible linear shaped charge) embedded within the acrylic plastic of the canopy. The MDC is initiated when the eject handle is pulled, and shatters the canopy over the seat a few milliseconds before the seat is launched. This system was developed for the Hawker Siddeley Harrier family of VTOL aircraft as ejection may be necessary while the aircraft was in the hover, and jettisoning the canopy might result in the pilot and seat striking it. This system is also used in the T-6 Texan II and F-35 Lightning II.

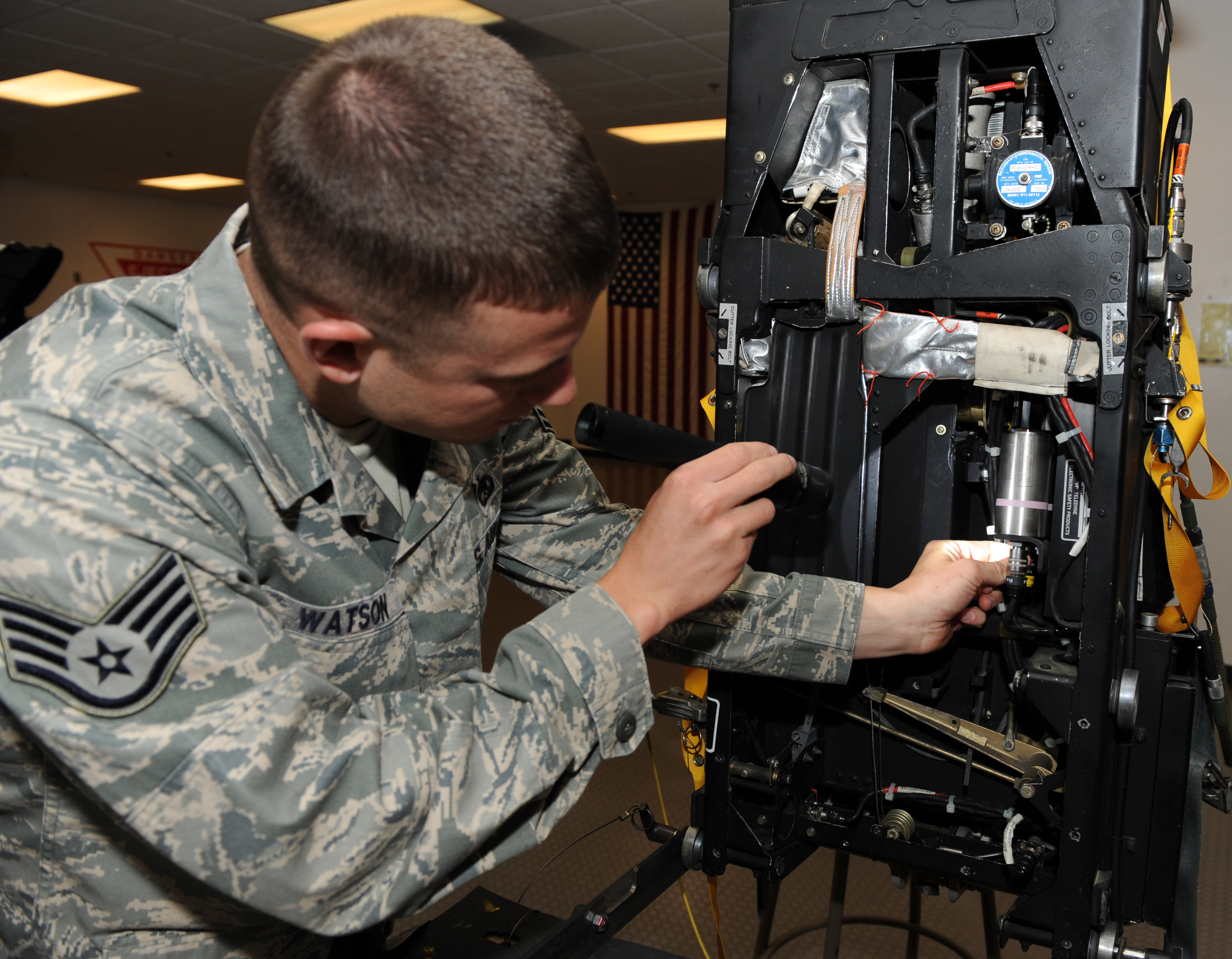
The ACES II ejection seat commonly used on United States Air Force jets

Through-canopy penetration is similar to canopy destruct, but a sharp spike on the top of the seat, known as the "shell tooth", strikes the underside of the canopy and shatters it. The A-10 Thunderbolt II is equipped with canopy breakers on either side of its headrest in the event that the canopy fails to jettison. The T-6 is also equipped with such breakers if the MDC fails to detonate. In ground emergencies, a ground crewman or pilot can use a breaker knife attached to the inside of the canopy to shatter the transparency. The A-6 Intruder and EA-6B Prowler seats were capable of ejecting through the canopy, with canopy jettison a separate option if there is enough time.

CD and TCP systems cannot be used with canopies made of flexible materials, such as the Lexan polycarbonate canopy used on the F-16.

Soviet VTOL naval fighter planes such as the Yakovlev Yak-38 were equipped with ejection seats which were automatically activated during at least some part of the flight envelope.

Drag extraction is the lightest and simplest egress system available, and has been used on many experimental aircraft. Halfway between simply "bailing out" and using explosive-eject systems, Drag extraction uses the airflow past the aircraft (or spacecraft) to move the aviator out of the cockpit and away from the stricken craft on a guide rail. Some operate like a standard ejector seat, by jettisoning the canopy, then deploying a drag chute into the airflow. That chute pulls the occupant out of the aircraft, either with the seat or following release of the seat straps, who then rides off the end of a rail extending far enough out to help clear the structure. In the case of the Space Shuttle, the astronauts would have ridden a long, curved rail, blown by the wind against their bodies, then deployed their chutes after free-falling to a safe altitude.

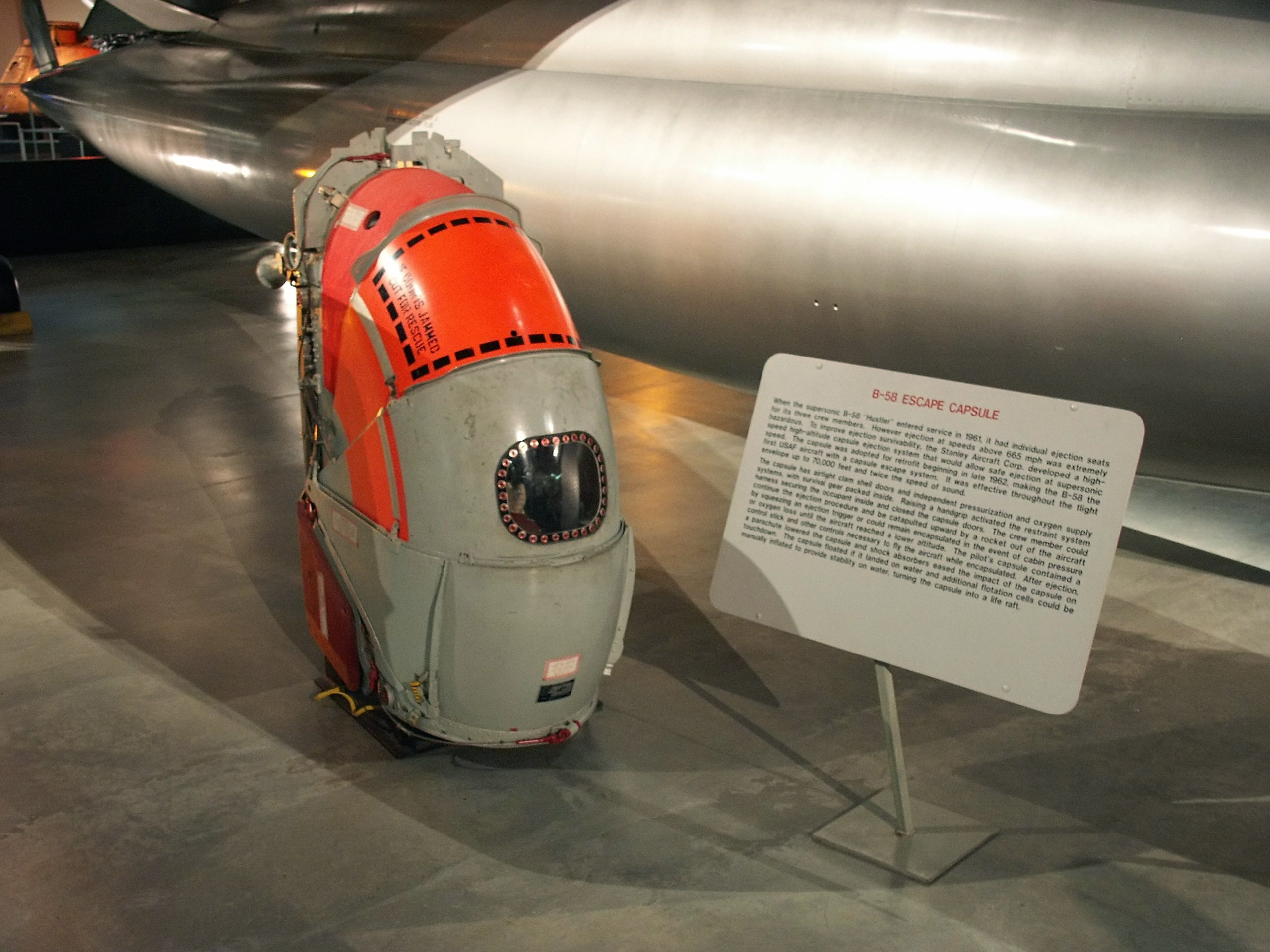
Crewmember escape capsule from a B-58 Hustler

Encapsulated seat egress systems were developed for use in the B-58 Hustler and B-70 Valkyrie supersonic bombers. These seats were enclosed in an air-operated clamshell, which permitted the aircrew to escape at airspeeds and altitudes high enough to otherwise cause bodily harm. These seats were designed to allow the pilot to control the plane even with the clamshell closed, and the capsule would float in case of water landings.

Some aircraft designs, such as the General Dynamics F-111, do not have individual ejection seats, but instead, the entire section of the airframe containing the crew can be ejected as a single capsule. In this system, very powerful rockets are used, and multiple large parachutes are used to bring the capsule down, in a manner similar to the Launch Escape System of the Apollo spacecraft. On landing, an airbag system is used to cushion the landing, and this also acts as a flotation device if the crew capsule lands in water.

=== Zero-zero ejection seat ===
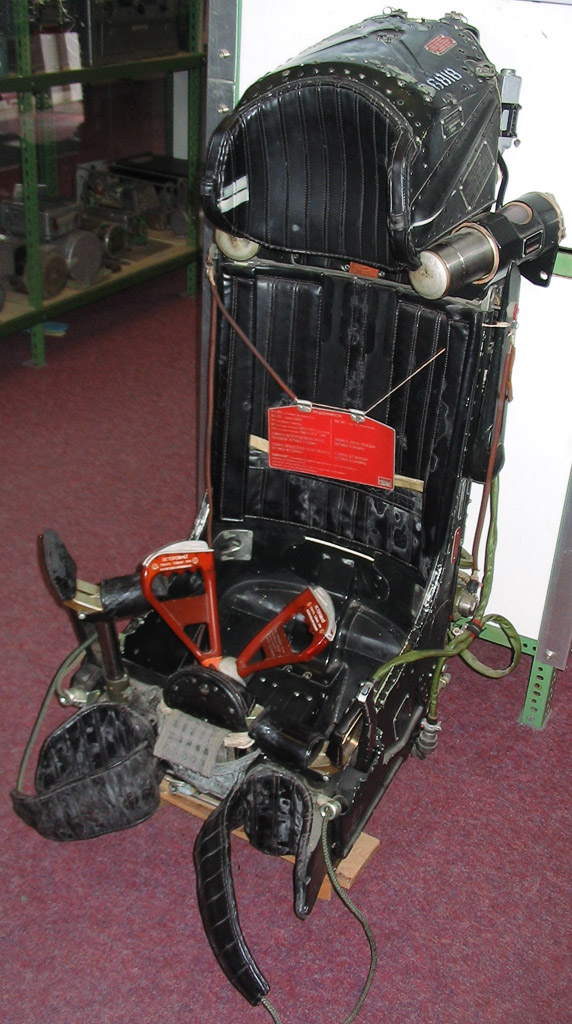
K-36DM ejection seat used on MiG-29, Su-30

A zero-zero ejection seat is designed to safely extract upward and land its occupant from a grounded stationary position (i.e., zero altitude and zero airspeed), specifically from aircraft cockpits. The zero-zero capability was developed to help aircrews escape upward from unrecoverable emergencies during low-altitude or low-speed flight, as well as ground mishaps. Parachutes require a minimum altitude for opening, to give time for deceleration to a safe landing speed. Thus, prior to the introduction of zero-zero capability, ejections could only be performed above minimum altitudes and airspeeds. If the seat was to work from zero (aircraft) altitude, the seat would have to lift itself to a sufficient altitude.

These early seats were fired from the aircraft with a cannon, providing the high impulse needed over the very short length on the cannon barrel within the seat. This limited the total energy, and thus the additional height possible, as otherwise the high forces needed would crush the pilot.

Modern zero-zero technology use small rockets to propel the seat upward to an adequate altitude and a small explosive charge to open the parachute canopy quickly for a successful parachute descent, so that proper deployment of the parachute no longer relies on airspeed and altitude. The seat cannon clears the seat from the aircraft, then the under-seat rocket pack fires to lift the seat to altitude. As the rockets fire for longer than the cannon, they do not require the same high forces. Zero-zero rocket seats also reduced forces on the pilot during any ejection, reducing injuries and spinal compression.

== Other vehicles ==
The Kamov Ka-50 and its successor, the Kamov Ka-52, were the first and only serial production helicopters with ejection seats. The system is similar to that of a conventional fixed-wing aircraft; however the main rotors are equipped with explosive bolts to jettison the blades moments before the seat is fired, preventing the pilots being struck and killed by them.

The only commercial jetliner ever fitted with ejection seats was the Soviet Tupolev Tu-144. However, the seats were present in the prototype only, and were only available for the crew and not the passengers. The Tu-144 that crashed at the Paris Air Show in 1973 was a production model, and did not have ejection seats.

An unusual arrangement of ejection seat testing using an RF-5 Tiger cockpit mounted on the upper vertical stabilizer outside the main fuselage of a Tupolev Tu-154 (Serial no. 88A795). This was done by the IAMI (Iranian Aircraft Manufacturing Industry) for use as a testbed for launching indigenously-manufactured ejection seats safely away from the main fuselage when developing fighter projects.

The Lunar Landing Research Vehicle (LLRV) and its successor, the Lunar Landing Training Vehicle (LLTV), used ejection seats. Neil Armstrong ejected on 6 May 1968, following Joe Algranti and Stuart M. Present.

The only spacecraft ever flown with installed ejection seats were Vostok, Gemini, and the Space Shuttle.

Early flights of the Space Shuttle, which used Columbia, were with a crew of two, both provided with ejector seats (STS-1 to STS-4), but the seats were disabled and then removed as the crew size was increased. Columbia and Enterprise were the only two Space Shuttle orbiters fitted with ejection seats. The Buran-class orbiters were planned to be fitted with K-36RB (K-36M-11F35) seats, but as the program was canceled, the seats were never used.

Asides rocket sleds, no land vehicle has ever been fitted with an ejection seat as they do not have enough altitude and time for parachutes to open, though it is a common trope in fiction. A notable example in fiction is the Aston Martin DB5 from the James Bond films, which has an ejecting passenger seat.

== See also ==
- Attacks on parachutists – discusses the 1949 Geneva Conventions on War, declaring it illegal to attack ejecting aircrew until they land
- Caterpillar Club
- Dynamic response index
- Escape pod
- Launch escape system
- Airborne lifeboat
- Lifeboat
- Pressure suit
- Ejection Tie Club
