= Anastase Dragomir =

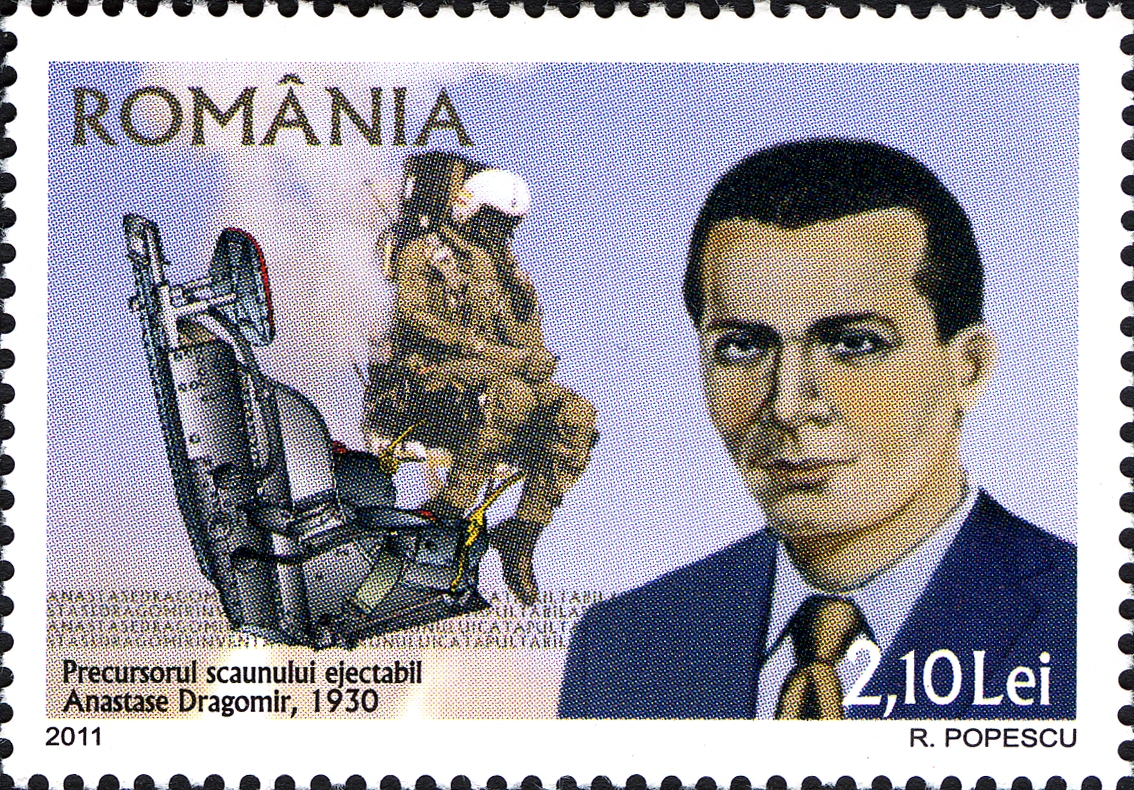

Anastase Dragomir (1896–1966) was a distinguished Romanian inventor, most famous for his "catapultable cockpit" patent (with Tănase Dobrescu) as an early form of ejection seat, although preceded by Everard Calthrop's 1916 compressed air ejection seat, and others.

Anastase Dragomir, born 6 February 1896 in Brăila, Romania, was the sixth child of his family. He worked in France at several aircraft factories where he perfected a system to save pilots and passengers in case of accidents. On 3 November 1928 he applied for French patent #678566, "Nouveau système de montage des parachutes dans les appareils de locomotion aérienne". Issued on 2 April 1930, the invention was, "a new system of parachuting from the apparatus for air locomotion, each passenger having his own parachute that allows, in critical moments, the assembly detaching from the plane, so the parachute with seated passenger passes through an opening."

After several attempts, Dragomir managed to obtain financing and began construction of his "catapulted cockpit". The invention was tested in a Farman airplane piloted by Lucien Bossoutrot at Paris-Orly, France airport on 28 August 1929. French newspapers later reported on the invention's success. Dragomir returned home to Romania after the Paris-Orly experiment where, with Romanian aviation engineer captain Constantin Nicolau, he successfully repeated the experiment in an Avia airplane at Băneasa Airport in Bucharest, Romania on 26 October 1929. He continued to refine his invention and obtained Romanian patent #40658 in 1950 for his "parachuted cell". In 1960, he received Romanian patent #41424 for a transport aircraft equipped with ejection cabins. Anastase Dragomir died in Bucharest, Romania in June 1966.

The photograph shown on the stamp is of the independently designed and developed British Martin-Baker ejection seat.

== Sources ==
- French patent FR678566
- True Romania
- Observatorul
