= Dynamic response index =

Measure of the likelihood of spinal damage from a vertical shock load

The Dynamic Response Index (DRI) is a measure of the likelihood of spinal damage arising from a vertical shock load such as might be encountered in a military environment (i.e., during a mine blast, or in an ejection seat). The DRI is a dimensionless number which is proportional to the maximum spinal compression suffered during the event.

The DRI is derived as the solution to an equation which models the human spine as a lumped single-degree-of-freedom spring-shock absorber system. The model uses an ordinary linear second-order differential equation with constant coefficients with spinal compression as the variable. The forcing function in the equation is the accelerative shock load delivered to the pelvis by the event. The equation is given below:

${d^2 X \over dt^2} + 2 \cdot \zeta \cdot \omega \cdot {dX \over dt} + \omega^2 \cdot X = {d^2 z \over dt^2}$

In this equation, X denotes the spinal compression, and d^{2}z/dt^{2} denotes the time-dependent shock acceleration (the input). The coefficients ω and ζ are the lumped spinal frequency and damping, ω = 52.90 radians/second, ζ = 0.224.

The DRI is defined in terms of the maximum spinal compression (X_{max}) calculated from the differential equation, DRI = (ω^{2}/G)·X_{max}, where G is the acceleration of gravity (9.806 m/s^{2}).

The DRI measure was derived from research on cadavers, as well as from “willing volunteers” (essentially, aviators who activated the ejection seat mechanism).

The limiting DRI value according to NATO STANAG 4569 is 17.7 with a 10% chance of serious injury. This corresponds to a maximum spinal compression of about 62 mm.

A simple rule of thumb for short duration shocks (much less than about a quarter of a cycle, which means much less than about 30 ms) is DRI = 3.96·ΔV, where ΔV is the total impulse delivered by the shock in units of meters per second. ΔV is simply the integral under the shock acceleration curve, equivalent to the “liftoff” velocity of the object undergoing shock loading. For a constant impulse, the DRI decreases as the duration of the pulse increases beyond about 30 ms.

== See also ==
- Back injury
- Crashworthiness
- Ejection seat
- Spinal injury
