= Michela Cerruti =

Italian racing driver

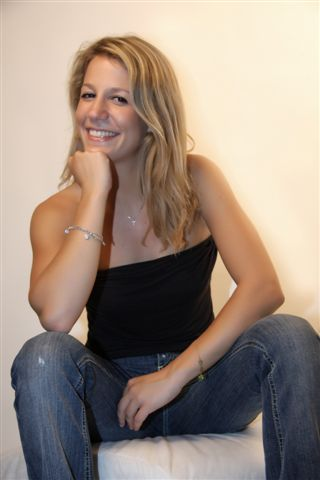
- Nationality: (Italy) Italian
- Born: 18 February 1987 (age 39) Rome, Italy

TCR International Series career
- Debut season: 2015
- Current team: GE-Force
- Categorisation: FIA Bronze (until 2014); FIA Silver (2015–)
- Car number: 88
- Former teams: Target Competition
- Starts: 14
- Championships: 0
- Wins: 0
- Poles: 0
- Fastest laps: 0
- Best finish: 29th in 2016
- Finished last season: 29th

Previous series
- 2015 2015 2015 2015 2014–15 2013–14 2013 2013 2012–14 2012 2012 2012 2010–11 2009–10, 2012–13 2008–09, 2011: Italian GT Championship; NASCAR Whelen Euro Series; Renault Sport Trophy; VLN; Formula E Auto GP; Eurocup Mégane Trophy; European Formula 3 Blancpain Endurance Series; European F3 Open; German Formula Three; Toyota Racing Series; Superstars Series; Italian GT Championship; Italian Touring Endurance

Michela Cerruti (born 18 February 1987) is an Italian former racing driver.

== Career ==
Born in Rome, Cerruti attended the Università Cattolica del Sacro Cuore in Milan, studying Psychology. Cerruti's racing career began after her father Aldo 'Baronio' Cerruti, also a racing driver, decided to enrol her in a safe driving course with Mario Ferraris, son of Romeo Ferraris, a race-car tuner and constructor. Impressed by Michela's 'speed and instinctive car control', Ferraris convinced Cerruti's father to let her race.

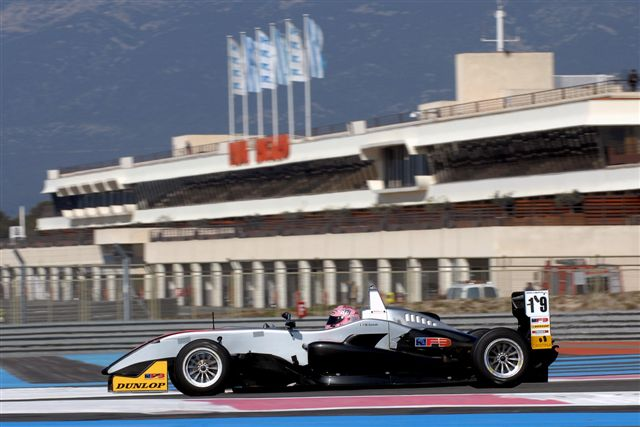
Cerruti competing in the European F3 Open series.

Cerruti debuted in the Italian Touring Endurance Championship (CITE) in 2008, racing an Alfa Romeo 147, sharing the drive with Mario Ferraris, finishing third in the class standings. She remained in CITE in 2009, racing an Abarth 500.

For 2010, Cerruti stepped up to the Superstars Series, racing a Mercedes C63 AMG for the Romeo Ferraris team. She also competed in the Italian GT Championship for the team in a Ferrari F430.

Remaining in the Superstars Series for a second season in 2011, Cerruti impressed at the opening weekend of the season at Monza, topping the two free practice sessions. She then went on to finish the first race in second position, before winning the second race and taking the championship lead.

In 2014, it was announced that Cerruti would drive for Trulli GP in the inaugural season of Formula E. She competed in four races with a best finish of 12th before she was replaced by Vitantonio Liuzzi for the remainder of the season.

Following a few years racing TCR, Cerruti retired from driving in 2017 to start a family. In 2022, she was appointed as team principal at Romeo Ferraris.

== Racing record ==
=== Complete International Superstars Series results ===
(key)

Year	Team	Car	1	2	3	4	5	6	7	8	9	10	11	12	13	14	15	16	DC	Points
2010	Romeo Ferraris	Mercedes C63 AMG	MNZ; 1; 12	MNZ; 2; 12	IMO; 1; 16	IMO; 2; 13	ALG; 1	ALG; 2	HOC; 1 Ret	HOC; 2 Ret	CPR; 1 Ret	CPR; 2 DNS	VAL; 1; 22	VAL; 2; 13	KYA; 1; 10	KYA; 2 Ret			30th	1
2011	Romeo Ferraris	Mercedes C63 AMG	MNZ; 1; 2	MNZ; 2; 1	VNC; 1 Ret	VNC; 2; 9	ALG; 1; 8	ALG; 2 Ret	DON; 1; 12	DON; 2; 13	MIS; 1; 11	MIS; 2 Ret	SPA; 1; 4	SPA; 2; 7	MUG; 1; 11	MUG; 2 Ret	VAL; 1; 8	VAL; 2; 9	9th	59

=== Complete FIA Formula 3 European Championship results ===
(key)

Year	Entrant	Engine	1	2	3	4	5	6	7	8	9	10	11	12	13	14	15	16	17	18	19	20	21	22	23	24	25	26	27	28	29	30	DC	Points
2013	Romeo Ferraris	Mercedes	MNZ; 1; 21	MNZ; 2 Ret	MNZ; 3; 20	SIL; 1	SIL; 2	SIL; 3	HOC; 1	HOC; 2	HOC; 3	BRH; 1; 25	BRH; 2; 26	BRH; 3; 19	RBR; 1	RBR; 2	RBR; 3	NOR; 1; 18	NOR; 2; 28	NOR; 3; 20	NÜR; 1	NÜR; 2	NÜR; 3	ZAN; 1	ZAN; 2	ZAN; 3	VAL; 1	VAL; 2	VAL; 3	HOC; 1	HOC; 2	HOC; 3	35th	0

=== Complete Auto GP results ===
(key)

Year	Entrant	1	2	3	4	5	6	7	8	9	10	11	12	13	14	15	16	Pos	Points
2013	MLR 71	MNZ; 1	MNZ; 2	MAR; 1	MAR; 2	HUN; 1	HUN; 2	SIL; 1	SIL; 2	MUG; 1	MUG; 2	NÜR; 1; 9	NÜR; 2; 8	DON; 1	DON; 2	BRN; 1; 16†	BRN; 2; 13	19th	5
2014	Super Nova International	MAR; 1; 4	MAR; 2; 5	LEC; 1; 7	LEC; 2; 5	HUN; 1; 10	HUN; 2; 10	MNZ; 1; 3	MNZ; 2; 7	IMO; 1; 5	IMO; 2; 1	RBR; 1 Ret	RBR; 2; 3	NÜR; 1; 6	NÜR; 2; 5	EST; 1	EST; 2	6th	113

=== Complete Formula E results ===
(key)

Year	Team	Chassis	Powertrain	1	2	3	4	5	6	7	8	9	10	11	Pos	Points
2014–15	Trulli Formula E Team	Spark SRT01-e	Renault	BEI; 14	PUT; Ret	PDE; 12	BUE; Ret	MIA	LBH	MCO	BER	MSC	LDN	LDN	29th	0

=== 24 Hours of Nürburgring results ===
Year	Team	Co-Drivers	Car	Class	Laps	Pos.	Class Pos.
2015	(Germany) Walkenhorst Motorsport	(United States) John Edwards (Germany) Felipe Fernández Laser (Germany) Daniel Keilwitz	BMW Z4 GT3	SP9	153	6th	6th

=== Complete TCR International Series results ===
(key) (Races in bold indicate pole position; races in italics indicate fastest lap)

Year	Team	Car	1	2	3	4	5	6	7	8	9	10	11	12	13	14	15	16	17	18	19	20	21	22	DC	Points
2015	Target Competition	SEAT León Cup Racer	SEP; 1	SEP; 2	SHA; 1	SHA; 2	VAL; 1	VAL; 2	ALG; 1	ALG; 2	MNZ; 1	MNZ; 2	SAL; 1	SAL; 2	SOC; 1	SOC; 2	RBR; 1; 10	RBR; 2; 8	MRN; 1	MRN; 2	CHA; 1	CHA; 2	MAC; 1	MAC; 2	31st	5
2016	Mulsanne Racing	Alfa Romeo Giulietta TCR	BHR; 1; 13	BHR; 2 Ret	EST; 1; 15	EST; 2; 14	SPA; 1	SPA; 2	IMO; 1	IMO; 2	SAL; 1; 10	SAL; 2 DSQ	OSC; 1; 12†	OSC; 2; 9	SOC; 1; 12	SOC; 2 Ret	CHA; 1	CHA; 2	MRN; 1	MRN; 2	SEP; 1	SEP; 2	MAC; 1	MAC; 2	29th	3
2017	GE-Force	Alfa Romeo Giulietta TCR	RIM; 1	RIM; 2	BHR; 1; 14	BHR; 2; 12	SPA; 1	SPA; 2	MNZ; 1	MNZ; 2	SAL; 1	SAL; 2	HUN; 1	HUN; 2	OSC; 1	OSC; 2	CHA; 1	CHA; 2	ZHE; 1	ZHE; 2	DUB; 1	DUB; 2			NC	0

^{†} Driver did not finish the race, but was classified as she completed over 90% of the race distance.
