= Trulli GP =

Former Swiss Formula E team

(Switzerland) Trulli GP
- Founded: June 2014
- Folded: December 2015
- Team principal(s): Jarno Trulli; Francesco Guarnieri
- Former series: Formula E
- Noted drivers: (Italy) Jarno Trulli (Italy) Michela Cerruti (Italy) Vitantonio Liuzzi (Switzerland) Alex Fontana (Mexico) Salvador Durán

Trulli GP (officially Trulli Formula E Team) was a Swiss motor racing team founded by former Formula One driver and Monaco Grand Prix winner Jarno Trulli to compete in the inaugural FIA Formula E Championship for electric cars.

== History ==
On 18 June 2014, Trulli GP was announced as the tenth and final confirmed entry into the inaugural Formula E season, taking over the entry originally held by Drayson Racing. Drayson stayed on as the teams' "principal technology partner", whilst Super Nova Racing were tasked with operating the team. Jarno Trulli announced that he would drive for his own team at launch, while Italian Auto GP driver Michela Cerruti was later announced as the second driver for the team.

At the opening round in Beijing, the two Trullis qualified on the penultimate row of the grid. Trulli retired with battery problems on the second lap whilst Cerruti finished the race in 14th and the first car off the lead lap. In Putrajaya, Cerruti was taken out by Katherine Legge whilst Trulli lost three laps in the pits with crash damage having run as high as second early in the race. Trulli scored the team's first points with fourth place in Punta del Este, and Cerruti finished twelfth by way of staying out of trouble – but both cars failed to finish in Buenos Aires with mechanical problems. At the Miami round, Vitantonio Liuzzi replaced Cerruti at the eleventh hour having been on holiday in the region – but both cars eventually finished the race a lap down.

The next two races in Long Beach and Monaco yielded no points and one retirement apiece before the team found some success in Berlin. Trulli scored a surprise pole position but sank through the field and finished two laps down in 19th, however Liuzzi went the opposite way and scored two points for finishing ninth. At the penultimate round in Moscow, Trulli drew the ire of rivals António Félix da Costa and Justin Wilson – as well as commentator Dario Franchitti – for consistently cutting a chicane and retaining position. Liuzzi and Trulli ultimately finished 17th and 18th respectively multiple laps off the lead. For the 2015 London ePrix, Liuzzi was replaced by Alex Fontana, as Liuzzi was competing in the GT Asia Series round at Okayama on the same weekend. The season ended poorly for the team, with Trulli finishing the first race 15th and retiring from the second with brake problems whilst Fontana retired from the first race with suspension issues and finished 14th in the second race. With just two points finishes and the points for pole in Berlin, Trulli finished last in the teams' championship with 17 points.

"I was pushing the throttle and I had electricity feeling in my leg, it was like itching. I was saying, 'Guys, there is something wrong because the car isn't moving but I feel itching in my right leg' and they said, 'No, this cannot be possible'. Luckily when I jumped out, nothing happened because I was part of the static car, but actually there was pure electricity going through my body."

— Vitantonio Liuzzi in a 2021 interview with Autosport.

From the second season, teams were allowed to independently develop powertrains and Trulli confirmed a partnership with Italian manufacturer Motomatica. Trulli himself meanwhile stood down from driving duties and was replaced with Mexican Salvador Durán, who had completed most of the first season with Andretti. The Motomatica powertrain proved perennially unreliable and dangerous during private testing, with Liuzzi claiming the car was "not even able to drive one metre out of the garage" due to constant breakdowns and that at one point he had been electrocuted. Following speculation the team could switch back to the season one powertrain as Team Aguri had done, they ultimately elected to persist with the troubled unit. The team organised private freight to the opening round in Beijing to continue troubleshooting, but failed pre-race scrutineering with most of its parts stuck in customs. Following withdrawal from the second round in Putrajaya, the team's future looked uncertain and it was ultimately withdrawn from the grid on 15 December 2015 in favour of new OEM Jaguar Racing's debut in the 2016–17 season.

== Results ==
Year	Chassis	Powertrain	Tyres	No.	Drivers	1	2	3	4	5	6	7	8	9	10	11	Points	T.C.
Trulli Formula E Team
2014–15	Spark SRT01-e	SRT01-e^{1}	M			BEI	PUT	PDE	BUE	MIA	LBH	MCO	BER	MSC	LON		17	10th
2014–15	Spark SRT01-e	SRT01-e^{1}	M	10	(Italy) Jarno Trulli	Ret	17	4	Ret	15	Ret	11	19†	18†	15	Ret	17	10th
2014–15	Spark SRT01-e	SRT01-e^{1}	M	18	(Italy) Michela Cerruti	14	Ret	12	Ret								17	10th
2014–15	Spark SRT01-e	SRT01-e^{1}	M	18	(Italy) Vitantonio Liuzzi					16	13	NC	9	17			17	10th
2014–15	Spark SRT01-e	SRT01-e^{1}	M	18	(Switzerland) Alex Fontana										Ret	14	17	10th
2015–16	Spark SRT01-e	Motomatica JT-01	M			BEI	PUT	PDE	BUE	MEX	LBH	PAR	BER	LON			0	NC
2015–16	Spark SRT01-e	Motomatica JT-01	M	10	(Italy) Vitantonio Liuzzi	DNP	DNP										0	NC
2015–16	Spark SRT01-e	Motomatica JT-01	M	18	(Mexico) Salvador Durán	DNP											0	NC
2015–16	Spark SRT01-e	Motomatica JT-01	M	18	(Italy) Jarno Trulli		DNP										0	NC

Notes

- ^1 – In the inaugural season, all teams were supplied with a spec powertrain by McLaren.
- † – Driver did not finish the race, but was classified as he completed over 90% of the race distance.
- * – Season still in progress.
