= Spark-Renault SRT 01E =

Electric formula race car designed for use in the FIA Formula E Championship

Spark-Renault SRT_01E
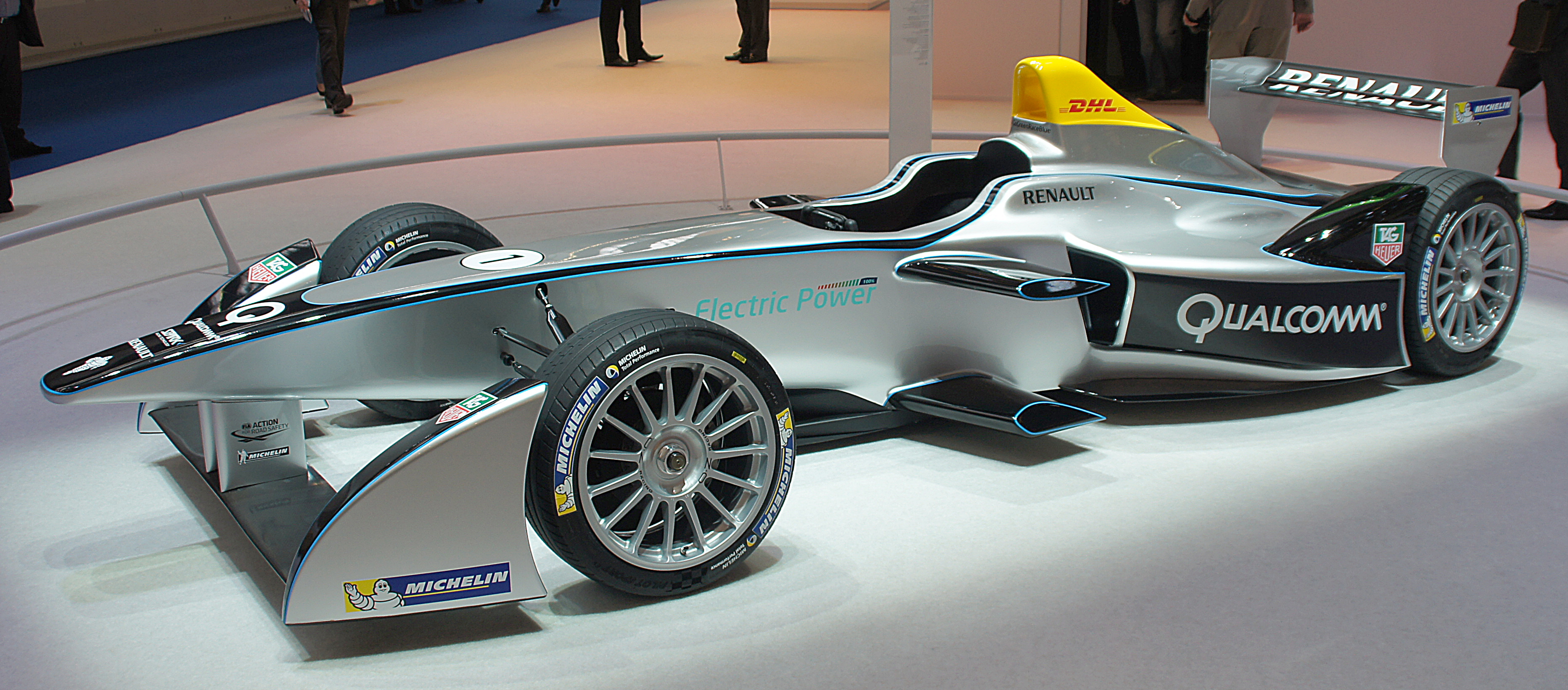
- Category: FIA Formula E Championship
- Constructor: Dallara; Spark Racing Technology
- Designers: Fred Vasseur; Théophile Gouzin (Technical Director)
- Successor: SRT05e

Technical specifications
- Chassis: Carbon fibre and aluminium monocoque
- Suspension (front): Double steel wishbones, pushrod operated with twin dampers and torsion bars
- Suspension (rear): Spring
- Length: 5,000 mm (197 in)
- Width: 1,800 mm (71 in)
- Height: 1,250 mm (49 in)
- Axle track: 1,300 mm (51 in)
- Electric motor: McLaren Electronic Systems Motor Generator Unit mid-mounted
- Transmission: Hewland five-speed sequential paddle-shift gearbox
- Battery: 28kWh Li-ion by Williams Advanced Engineering
- Power: Max power 200 kW (268 hp; 272 PS); power-saving race mode restricted to 150 kW (201 hp; 204 PS); additional push-to-pass providing 30 kW (40 hp; 41 PS)
- Weight: 898 kg (1,980 lb) including driver (minimum weight required)
- Tyres: Michelin

Competition history
- Notable entrants: (Japan) Amlin Aguri (United States) Andretti Autosport (Germany) Audi Sport Abt; China Racing (United States) Dragon Racing (France) e.dams (India) Mahindra Racing (Switzerland) Trulli GP (Monaco) Venturi Grand Prix (United Kingdom) Virgin Racing

The Spark-Renault SRT_01E, also known as the SRT01-e (since the 2015–16 season) or the Spark Gen1 (after the introduction of the successive Gen2 chassis), was an electric formula race car designed for the inaugural season of Formula E, in 2014–15. The car was the result of a 10-month collaboration between Spark Racing Technology, McLaren Electronic Systems, Williams Advanced Engineering, Dallara and Renault. The car was used until the end of Formula E's fourth season in 2018, after which it was replaced by the SRT05e.

== Development ==
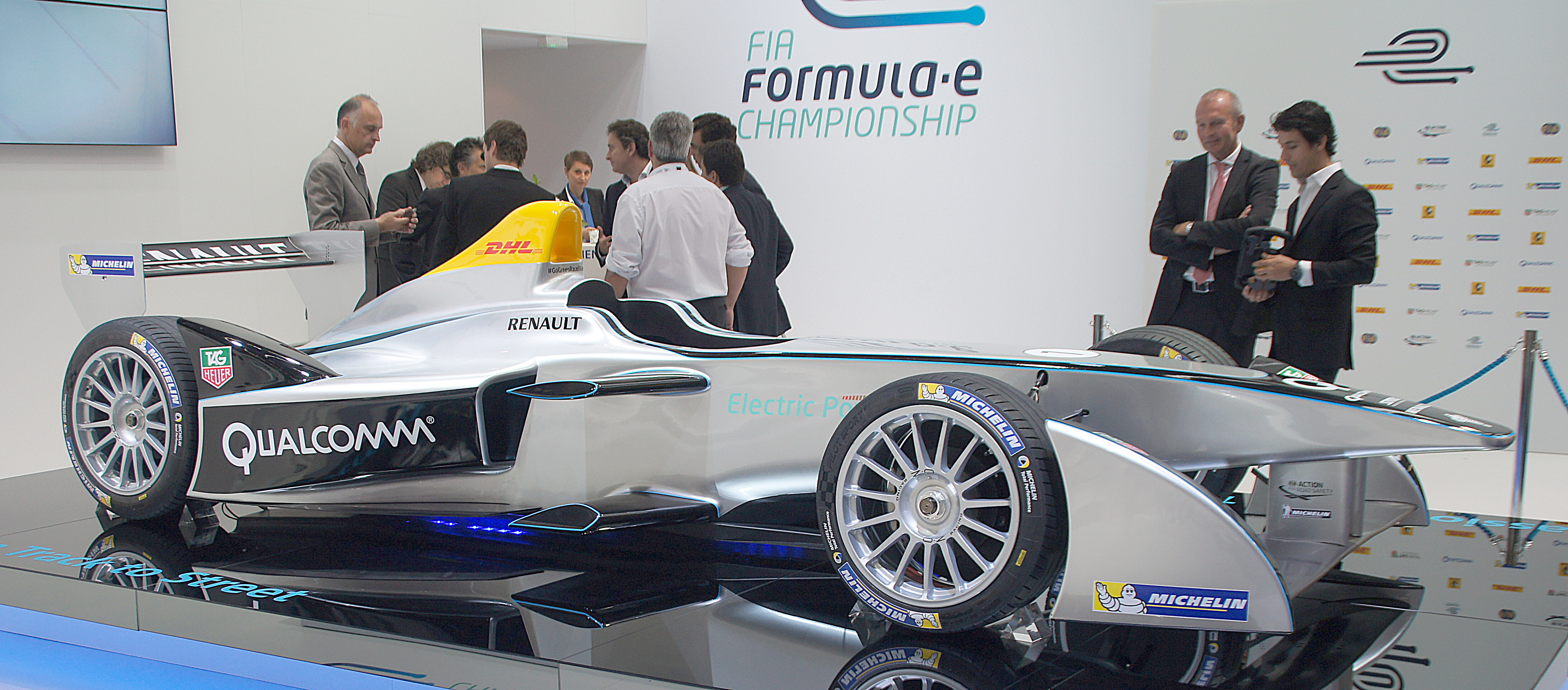
After unveiling of Spark Renault SRT_01 E at Frankfurt Motor Show: among others Lucas di Grassi (rightmost, with the steering wheel in his hands) and Alejandro Agag (6th person from left).

Development of the car started in September 2012. Lucas di Grassi was appointed as official test driver, demonstrating the prototype, the Formulec EF01 (built in 2010). The Formulec EF01 featured a chassis constructed by Mercedes GP and motors built by Siemens. The car was used for the official promotion video and for demonstrations in host cities.

On 1 November 2012, McLaren Electronic Systems was announced to provide the electric motor, transmission and electronics for Formula E. The Formula E organisation ordered 42 cars from Spark Racing Technology. For this order Spark partnered with well renowned formula car manufacturer Dallara.

Michelin was announced as an exclusive tyre-supplier on 28 March 2013. On 15 May 2013 Renault was announced as technical partner of Spark Racing Technology. Renault's experience in the Renault Z.E. (Zero Emission) and Formula One programmes will be used to put to Formula E's advantage. On the same day, Formula E unveiled the design of the Spark-Renault SRT_01E.

The battery design was in the hands of Williams Advanced Engineering, part of the Williams Group to which the Formula One team belongs.

At the Frankfurt Motor Show, on 10 September 2013, the Spark-Renault SRT_01E was revealed by FIA president Jean Todt and Formula E Holdings CEO Alejandro Agag.

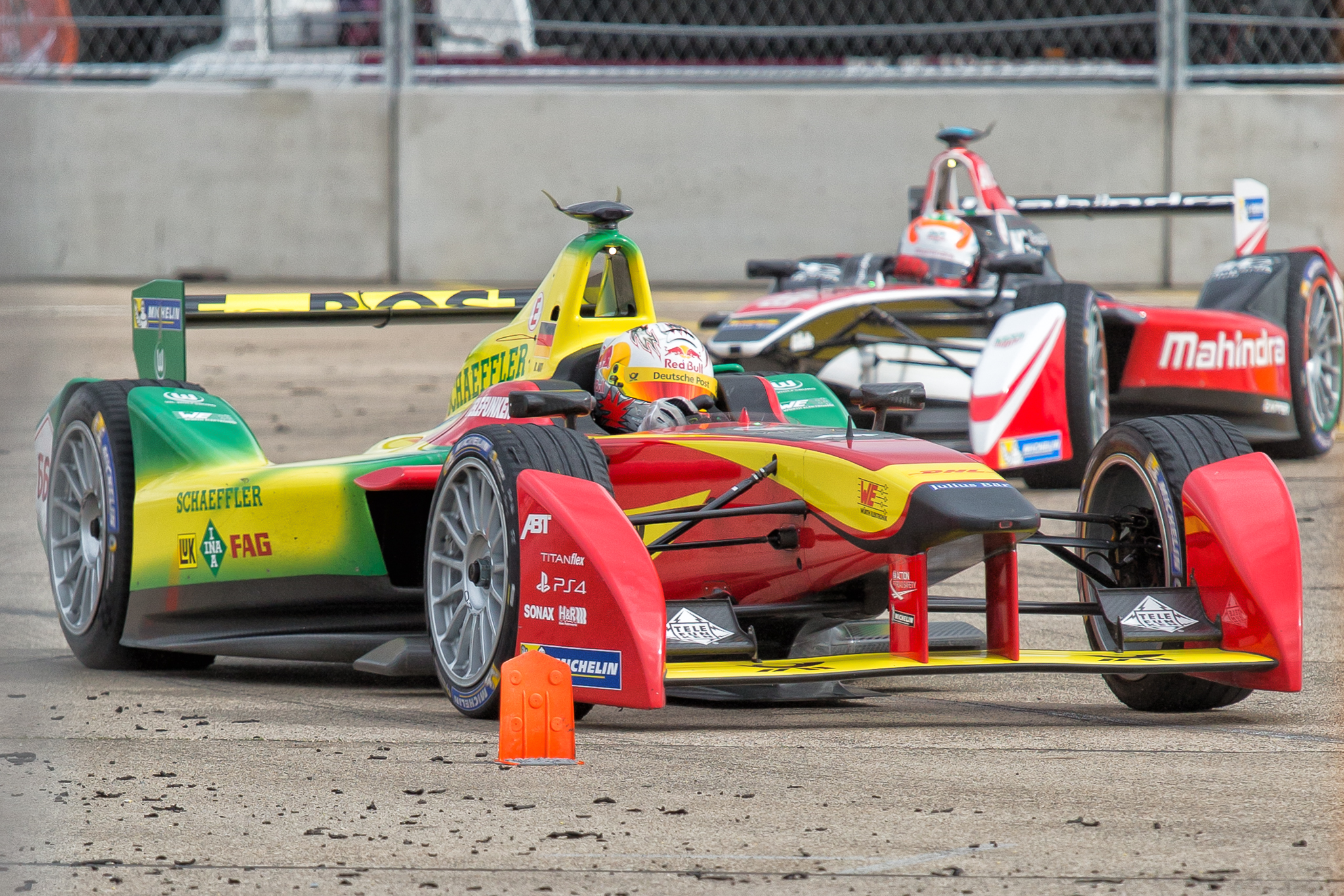
Daniel Abt in the Audi Sport ABT-skinned car during the 2015 Berlin ePrix.

On 3 July 2014, the first official trial of the cars took place in Donington Park, England. The trial ended around 21 August with each team running all four of their cars completing a combined total of 1222 laps. The fastest time was 1:29.920, recorded by the Abt team – a McLaren MP4-12C recorded a lap time of 1:29.679 during the 2012 British GT season.

== Technology ==
=== RESS ===
The Spark-Renault SRT_01E featured a Rechargeable Energy Storage System (RESS). According to Appendix J article 251 3.1.7 of the ISC, the RESS is the complete energy storage device, comprising an energy storage medium (e.g. flywheel, capacitor or battery). The design of the RESS is free but must be homologated by the FIA. Part of the RESS is the traction batteries and the Battery Management System, these are supplied by Williams Advanced Engineering.

=== Electric motor ===
The electric motor is built by McLaren Electronic Technologies. The motor weighs 26 kg and produces a maximum of 270 bhp with 140Nm of instant torque. The motor was originally developed for the McLaren P1 road car.

=== Charging ===
According to the regulations, the Formula E cars can be charged during practice, qualifying, the race and some other specified moments during a raceweekend. Drayson Racing and its technical partner QualcommHALO are developing a way to wirelessly charge the car. The wireless electric vehicle charging (WEVC) system uses a pad under a parking space to charge the car. The system is tested on the electric Drayson B12/69EV, a modified version of the Lola B08/60.

=== Tyres ===
The car was shod with 18-inch tyres. The FIA Formula E championship uses a tyre which is suitable for wet and dry conditions. The exclusive tyre supplier Michelin will only make one compound available, so there will be no hard or soft compounds like in Formula 1. The tyre is expected to last the whole race weekend.

== Technical specifications ==
=== Design ===
- Aerodynamics optimized to facilitate overtaking
- High ride height sensitivity and wide range of suspension set up possibilities to tackle the city centre streets
- Cost-effectiveness
- Compliant to FIA safety regulations

=== Technology ===
- Use of latest technology
- Compromise between performance and cost-effectiveness wherever possible
- Extensive use of composite materials but limited usage of the most expensive carbon-fibres

=== Dimensions ===
- Overall length: 5,000 mm (197 in) (max)
- Overall width: 1,800 mm (71 in) (max)
- Overall height: 1,250 mm (49 in) (max)
- Track width: 1,300 mm (51 in) (min)
- Ride Height: 75 mm (3 in) (max)
- Overall weight (inc driver): 888 kg (1,958 lb) (min) // Batteries alone 320 kg (705 lb)

=== Power ===
- Max power (limited): 200 kW (268 hp), approx 230 N⋅m (170 ft⋅lbf) torque (estimated)
- Race mode (power-saving): 180 Kw (245 hp)
- FanBoost: Additional 30 kW (40 hp)
- Power-to-weight ratio: 0.30 hp/kg.

Maximum power will be available during practice and qualifying sessions. During races, power-saving mode will apply with the push-to-pass system temporarily allowing maximum power for a limited time. The amount of energy that can be delivered to the Motor Generator Unit (MGU) by the Rechargeable Energy Storage System (RESS) is limited to 30 kWh. This will be monitored by the FIA.

=== Performance ===
- Acceleration: 0–100 km/h (0–62 mph) in 3 s — Estimated
- Maximum speed: 225 km/h (140 mph) (FIA limited)

Final performance figures are still to be verified.

=== Motors ===
- MGU by McLaren
- Maximum of two MGUs allowed
- MGUs must be linked only to the rear axle
- The use of traction control is forbidden

=== Traction battery ===
- The traction battery is a 28 kWh Rechargeable Energy Storage System (RESS) and supplies electric energy to the Power Circuit and thus to the traction motor. Any onboard battery electrically connected to the Power Circuit is considered to be an integral part of the vehicle's traction battery

=== Rechargeable Energy Storage System ===
- A Rechargeable Energy Storage System (RESS) is a system that is designed to propel the car via the electric motor. In order to comply they must be:
  - FIA Standard
  - The maximum weight of the Battery Cells and/or Capacitor of the RESS must not be higher than 200 kg
  - All Battery Cells must be certified to UN Transportation Standards as a minimum requirement

=== Chassis ===
The Dallara built car features:

- Chassis / Survival cell — Carbon/aluminium honeycomb structure
- Front and rear wing — Carbon structures and Aero styling
- Bodywork — Carbon — Kevlar honeycomb structures

=== Gearbox ===
- Hewland paddle-shift sequential gearbox
- Fixed gear ratios to reduce costs

=== Brakes ===
- Standard two separate Hydraulic systems, operated by the same pedal
- Brake material is a free choice
- Calipers; the section of each caliper piston must be circular

The body of the calipers must be made from aluminium alloy

=== Wheels and tyres ===
- Bespoke 18" treaded Michelin tyres for use on both wet and dry conditions/surfaces
- Championship specific wheel dimensions
- O.Z. Racing Magnesium wheels. Max width — front 260 mm (10 in) / rear 305 mm (12 in). Max Diameter — front 650 mm (26 in) / rear 690 mm (27 in)

=== Electronics ===
- McLaren Electronics ECU/GCU including data logging system
- Power supply management unit
- CAN data acquisition pre-equipment
- FIA Marshalling system
- Beacon receiver
- Telemetry is not permitted

=== Suspension ===
- Double-steel wishbones, pushrod-operated, twin-dampers and torsion bars suspension (front) and spring suspension (rear)
- Adjustable ride height, camber and toe
- Two way (front) / Four-way (rear) adjustable Koni dampers
- Adjustable anti-roll bar (front/rear)

=== Steering system ===
- Non-assisted rack and pinion steering system (power assistance is allowed)
- Steering wheel with dashboard, marshaling display, gear change, and clutch paddles

=== Safety ===
- FIA safety standards including front, side, rear, and steering column impact tests
- Front and rear roll hoop, impact structures, and monocoque push tests
- Anti-intrusion survival cell protection panels
- Wheel-retainer safety cables
- Extinguisher system (electronically operated)

=== Camera equipment ===
- Roll hoop, nose cone and face shot camera pre-equipment

== In video games ==
The series commissioned established sim racing developer MAK-Corp to create the SRT_01E for their Hyperstimulator Simulators for use at promotional events for the series. MAK-Corp's car is not available for public use. The car also features in Turn 10 Studios' game Forza Motorsport 5, Studio 397's rFactor 2 and EA's Real Racing 3 mobile game.
