= 2014–15 Formula E Championship =

Electric racing car championship

2014–15 FIA Formula E Championship

Seasons
- 2015–16 →

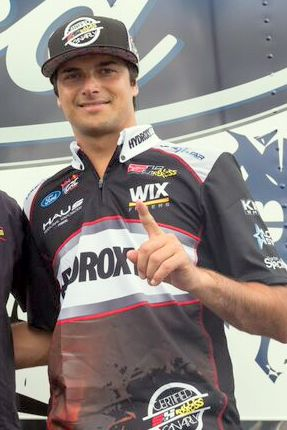
Nelson Piquet Jr. became the first ever Formula E Drivers' Champion.

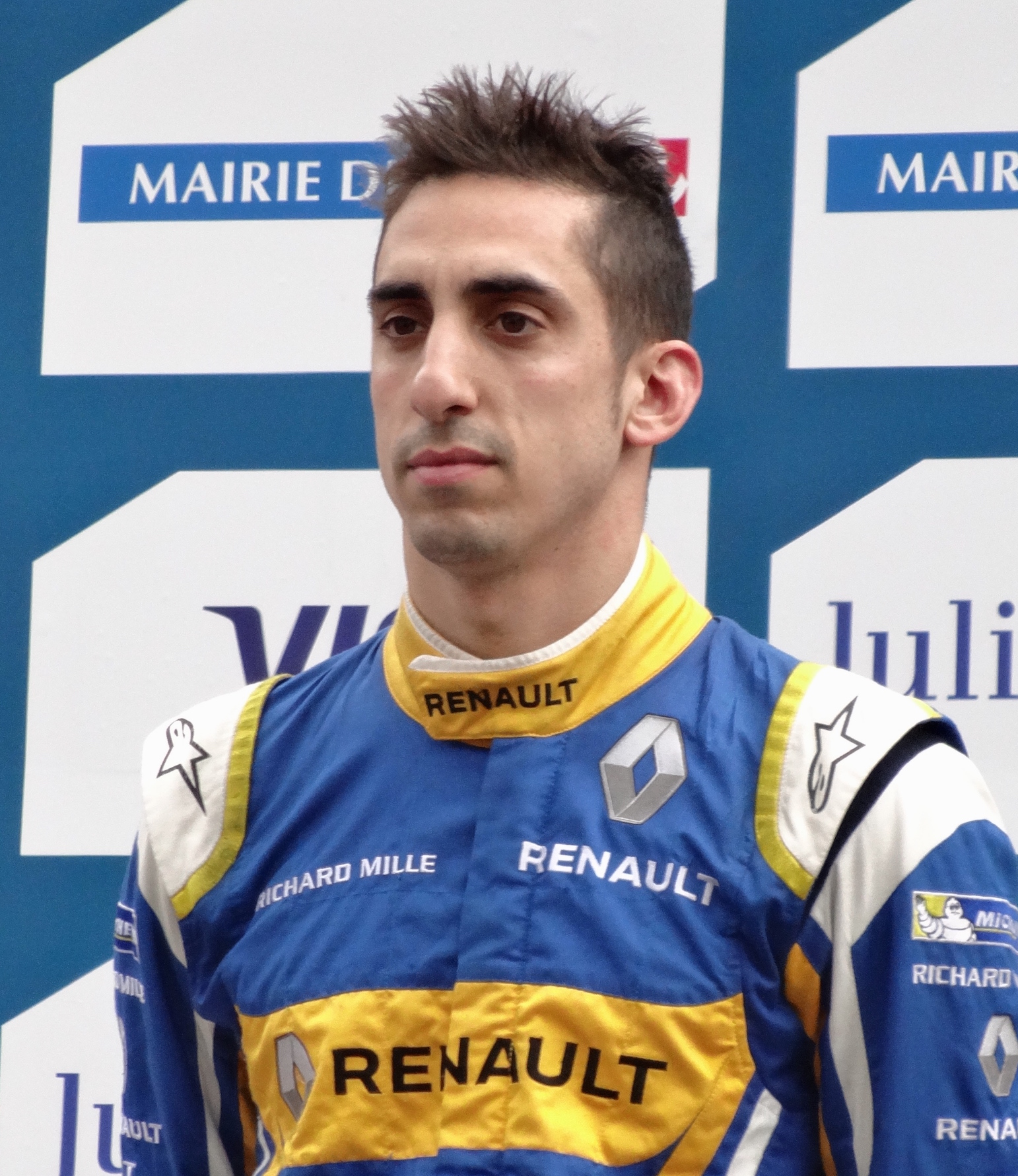
Sébastien Buemi finished second in the drivers standings, missing out on the championship by 1 point.

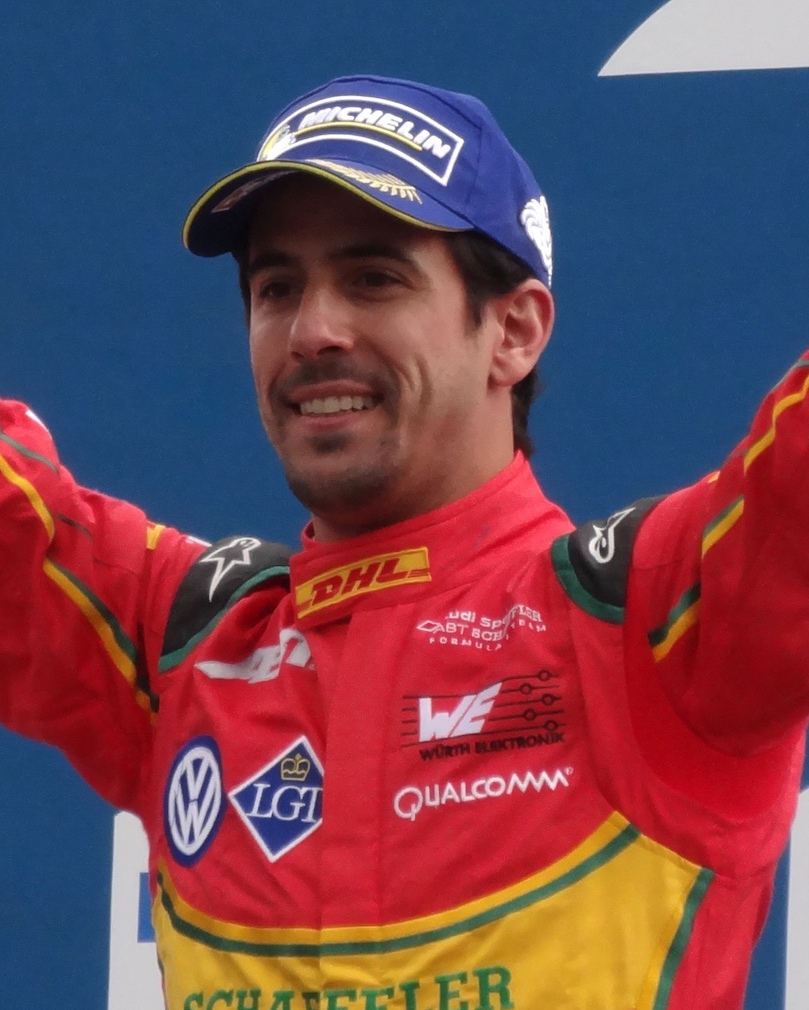
Lucas di Grassi won the first Formula E race, and finished the season third.

The 2014–15 FIA Formula E Championship was the inaugural season of Formula E, a new FIA championship for electrically-powered cars. It began on 13 September 2014 at Beijing in China and finished on 28 June 2015 in London after eleven races. Nelson Piquet Jr. came first in the overall standings, and so became the first ever Formula E champion.

== The car ==
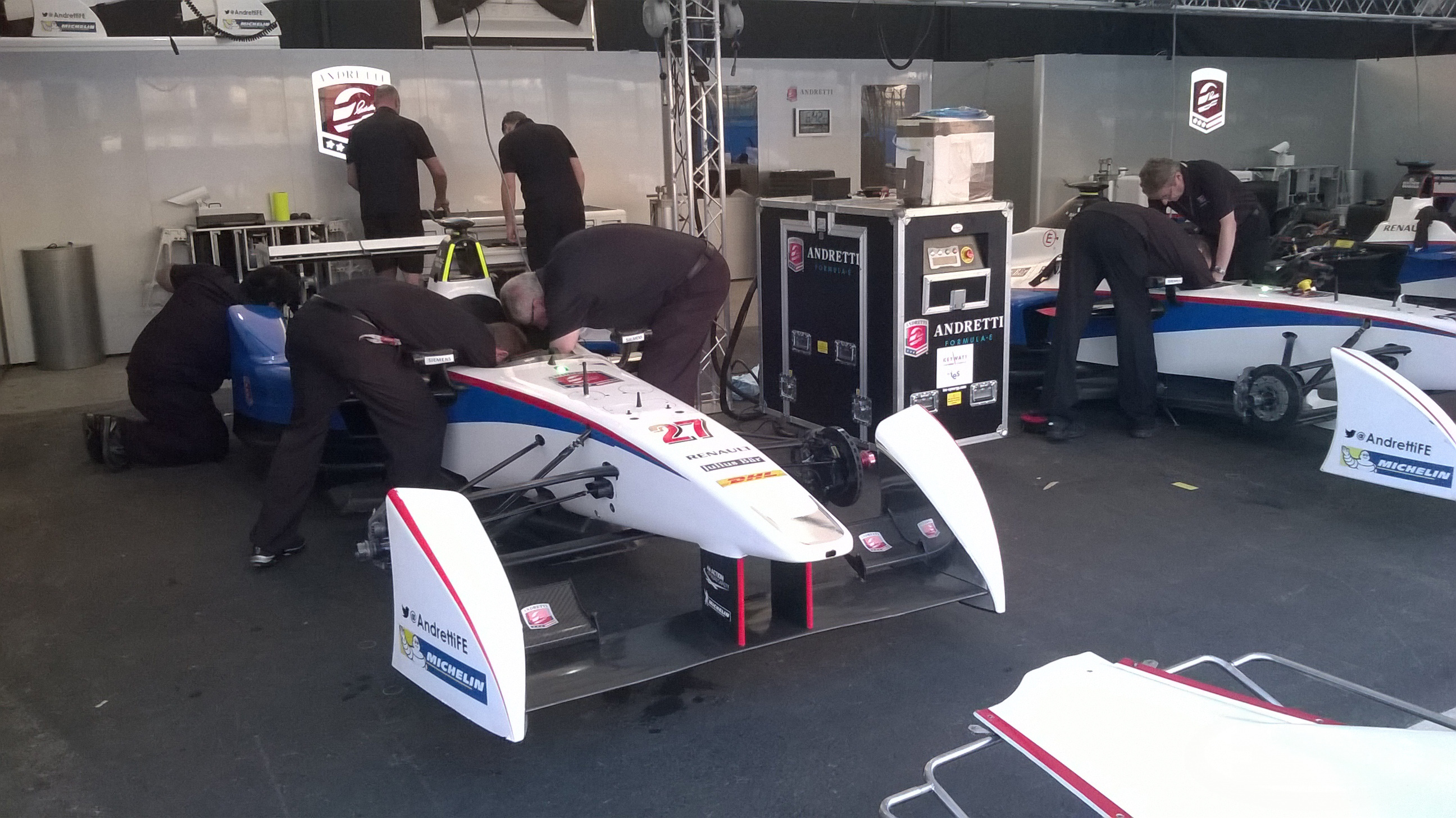
Spark-Renault SRT 01E in Andretti colors.

For the first season, all teams were supplied an electric racing car built by Spark Racing Technology, called the Spark-Renault SRT 01E. The chassis was designed by Dallara, with an electric motor developed by McLaren (the same as that used in its P1 supercar), a battery system created by Williams Grand Prix Engineering and a Hewland five-speed gearbox. Michelin were the official tyre supplier. 42 electric cars were ordered by the FIA.

== Teams and drivers ==
For the 2014–15 season, 10 teams contested the series. Each team fielded two drivers; each driver had two cars. That meant that 40 cars were required by the teams. All teams were ostensibly based at the sport's technical headquarters at the Donington Park race circuit, in the United Kingdom, although some teams had a greater presence there than others. Formula E organiser FEH itself has offices there for administration and operations staff.

All ten teams were confirmed to race in April 2014. However, in June 2014, Drayson Racing pulled out of the championship, with its entry taken by Trulli, a new team formed by former Formula One driver Jarno Trulli. Drayson entered the team in a supply and sponsorship arrangement, to be its principal technology partner.

Team	No.	Drivers	Rounds
(United Kingdom) Virgin Racing Formula E Team	2	(United Kingdom) Sam Bird	All
(United Kingdom) Virgin Racing Formula E Team	3	(Spain) Jaime Alguersuari	1–9
(United Kingdom) Virgin Racing Formula E Team	3	(Switzerland) Fabio Leimer	10–11
(India) Mahindra Racing Formula E Team	5	(India) Karun Chandhok	All
(India) Mahindra Racing Formula E Team	21	(Brazil) Bruno Senna	All
(United States) Dragon Racing Formula E Team	6	(Spain) Oriol Servià	1–4
(United States) Dragon Racing Formula E Team	6	(France) Loïc Duval	5–11
(United States) Dragon Racing Formula E Team	7	(Belgium) Jérôme d'Ambrosio	All
(France) Team e.dams Renault	8	(France) Nicolas Prost	All
(France) Team e.dams Renault	9	(Switzerland) Sébastien Buemi	All
(Switzerland) Trulli Formula E Team	10	(Italy) Jarno Trulli	All
(Switzerland) Trulli Formula E Team	18	(Italy) Michela Cerruti	1–4
(Switzerland) Trulli Formula E Team	18	(Italy) Vitantonio Liuzzi	5–9
(Switzerland) Trulli Formula E Team	18	(Switzerland) Alex Fontana	10–11
(Germany) Audi Sport ABT Formula E Team	11	(Brazil) Lucas di Grassi	All
(Germany) Audi Sport ABT Formula E Team	66	(Germany) Daniel Abt	All
(Monaco) Venturi Formula E Team	23	(Germany) Nick Heidfeld	All
(Monaco) Venturi Formula E Team	30	(France) Stéphane Sarrazin	All
(United States) Andretti Autosport Formula E Team	27	(France) Franck Montagny	1–2
(United States) Andretti Autosport Formula E Team	27	(France) Jean-Éric Vergne	3–11
(United States) Andretti Autosport Formula E Team	28	(France) Charles Pic	1
(United States) Andretti Autosport Formula E Team	28	(United States) Matthew Brabham (Note: Brabham is an Australian-American driver who was racing under an American racing license.)	2–3
(United States) Andretti Autosport Formula E Team	28	(United States) Marco Andretti	4
(United States) Andretti Autosport Formula E Team	28	(United States) Scott Speed	5–8
(United States) Andretti Autosport Formula E Team	28	(United Kingdom) Justin Wilson	9
(United States) Andretti Autosport Formula E Team	28	(Switzerland) Simona de Silvestro	10–11
(Japan) Amlin Aguri	55	(Japan) Takuma Sato	1
(Japan) Amlin Aguri	55	(Portugal) António Félix da Costa	2–9
(Japan) Amlin Aguri	55	(Japan) Sakon Yamamoto	10–11
(Japan) Amlin Aguri	77	(United Kingdom) Katherine Legge	1–2
(Japan) Amlin Aguri	77	(Mexico) Salvador Durán	3–11
China Racing Formula E Team (rounds 1–6); NEXTEV TCR Formula E Team (rounds 7–11)	88	(China) Ho-Pin Tung	1–2, 4
China Racing Formula E Team (rounds 1–6); NEXTEV TCR Formula E Team (rounds 7–11)	88	(Spain) Antonio García	3, 9
China Racing Formula E Team (rounds 1–6); NEXTEV TCR Formula E Team (rounds 7–11)	88	(France) Charles Pic	5–8
China Racing Formula E Team (rounds 1–6); NEXTEV TCR Formula E Team (rounds 7–11)	88	(United Kingdom) Oliver Turvey	10–11
China Racing Formula E Team (rounds 1–6); NEXTEV TCR Formula E Team (rounds 7–11)	99	(Brazil) Nelson Piquet Jr.	All

- Mike Conway was scheduled to compete for Dragon Racing, but withdrew before the season to focus on his FIA World Endurance Championship commitments with Toyota. He was replaced by fellow IndyCar racer Oriol Servià.

== Calendar ==
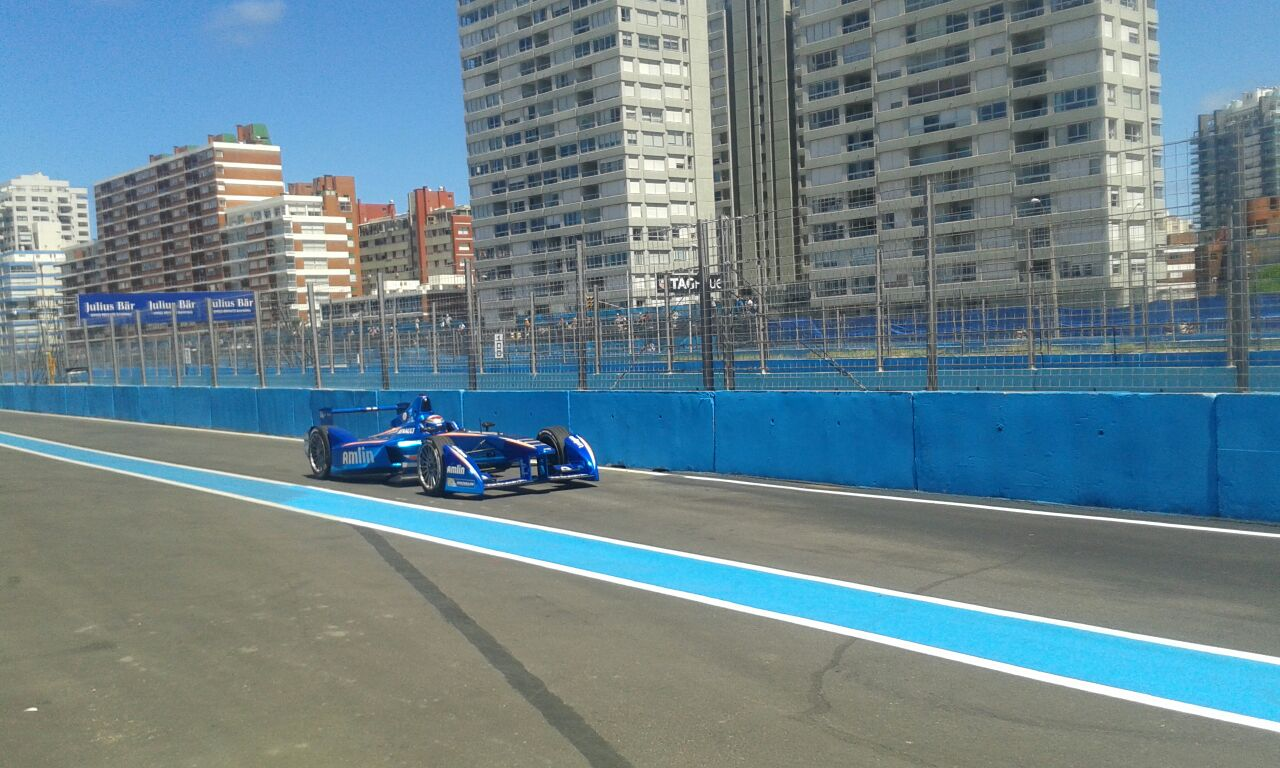
2014 Punta del Este ePrix.

The season included 11 races, held between September 2014 and June 2015. The initial calendar had ten races and was approved by the FIA World Motor Sport Council in December 2013. However, in April 2014, changes were made to the calendar including dropping Rio de Janeiro, which had previously replaced Hong Kong, and moving the Los Angeles round to 4 April. On 22 May 2014, Los Angeles County officials announced that their race would take place 40 km (25 mi) away on a modified version of the Long Beach Street Circuit. On 3 February 2015, it was revealed that a race would be held in Moscow on 6 June to restore the calendar to its original schedule of ten races. On 19 February 2015, it was announced that the final round in London would be a double-header, expanding the calendar to eleven races.

Round	ePrix	Country	Track	Date
1	Beijing ePrix	China	Beijing Olympic Green Circuit	13 September 2014
2	Putrajaya ePrix	Malaysia	Putrajaya Street Circuit	22 November 2014
3	Punta del Este ePrix	Uruguay	Punta del Este Street Circuit	13 December 2014
4	Buenos Aires ePrix	Argentina	Puerto Madero Street Circuit	10 January 2015
5	Miami ePrix	United States	Biscayne Bay Street Circuit	14 March 2015
6	Long Beach ePrix	United States	Long Beach Street Circuit	4 April 2015
7	Monaco ePrix	Monaco	Circuit de Monaco	9 May 2015
8	Berlin ePrix	Germany	Tempelhof Airport Street Circuit	23 May 2015
9	Moscow ePrix	Russia	Moscow Street Circuit	6 June 2015
10	London ePrix Race 1	United Kingdom	Battersea Park Street Circuit	27 June 2015
11	London ePrix Race 2	United Kingdom	Battersea Park Street Circuit	28 June 2015

=== ePrix locations ===
Location of ePrix in season 1.
(ePrix – single race)
(ePrix – double race)

== Race results ==
Round	Race	Pole position	Fastest lap	Winning driver	Winning team	Report
1	(China) Beijing	(France) Nicolas Prost	(Japan) Takuma Sato	(Brazil) Lucas di Grassi	(Germany) Audi Sport ABT	Report
2	(Malaysia) Putrajaya	(France) Nicolas Prost (Note: Nicolas Prost set the best time during qualification in Putrajaya, and accordingly, scored the three championship points on offer. He started from eleventh on the grid following a ten-place grid penalty which was levied on him for causing a collision with Nick Heidfeld in Beijing. Therefore, Oriol Servià, who set the second-fastest time, started the race from pole position.)	(Spain) Jaime Alguersuari	(United Kingdom) Sam Bird	(United Kingdom) Virgin Racing	Report
3	(Uruguay) Punta del Este	(France) Jean-Éric Vergne	(Germany) Daniel Abt	(Switzerland) Sébastien Buemi	(France) e.dams Renault	Report
4	(Argentina) Buenos Aires	(Switzerland) Sébastien Buemi	(United Kingdom) Sam Bird	(Portugal) António Félix da Costa	(Japan) Amlin Aguri	Report
5	(United States) Miami	(France) Jean-Éric Vergne	(Brazil) Nelson Piquet Jr.	(France) Nicolas Prost	(France) e.dams Renault	Report
6	(United States) Long Beach	(Germany) Daniel Abt (Note: Sébastien Buemi set the fastest time but had that time deleted for power overuse.)	(France) Nicolas Prost	(Brazil) Nelson Piquet Jr.	(China) NEXTEV TCR	Report
7	Monaco	(Switzerland) Sébastien Buemi	(France) Jean-Éric Vergne	(Switzerland) Sébastien Buemi	(France) e.dams Renault	Report
8	(Germany) Berlin	(Italy) Jarno Trulli	(Brazil) Nelson Piquet Jr.	(Belgium) Jérôme d'Ambrosio (Note: Lucas di Grassi and Audi Sport Abt were the initial winners but were disqualified when di Grassi's car was found to have breached technical regulations.)	(United States) Dragon Racing	Report
9	(Russia) Moscow	(France) Jean-Éric Vergne	(Switzerland) Sébastien Buemi	(Brazil) Nelson Piquet Jr.	(China) NEXTEV TCR	Report
10	(United Kingdom) London	(Switzerland) Sébastien Buemi	(Brazil) Lucas di Grassi	(Switzerland) Sébastien Buemi	(France) e.dams Renault	Report
11	(United Kingdom) London	(France) Stéphane Sarrazin	(United Kingdom) Sam Bird	(United Kingdom) Sam Bird (Note: Stéphane Sarrazin and Venturi were the initial winners but were given a post-race 49 second time-penalty for exceeding the maximum energy usage.)	(United Kingdom) Virgin Racing	Report

== Championship standings ==
Points system

Championship points were awarded as follows:

Position	**1st**	**2nd**	**3rd**	**4th**	**5th**	**6th**	**7th**	**8th**	**9th**	**10th**	**Pole**	**FL**
Points	25	18	15	12	10	8	6	4	2	1	3	2

Each driver's lowest-scoring round was dropped from their total; however, rounds where the driver was excluded from the race could not be dropped.

=== Drivers' Championship ===
Pos.	Driver	BEI (China)	PUT (Malaysia)	PDE (Uruguay)	BUE (Argentina)	MIA (United States)	LBH (United States)	MCO (Monaco)	BER (Germany)	MSC (Russia)	LDN (United Kingdom)		Pts
1	(Brazil) Nelson Piquet Jr.	8	Ret	2	3	5	1*	3*	4*	1*	5*	7*	144
2	(Switzerland) Sébastien Buemi	Ret	3	1	**Ret**	13	4	**1**	2*	9*	**1**	5*	143
3	(Brazil) Lucas di Grassi	1*	2	3	Ret	9	3	2	DSQ	2*	4	6	133
4	(Belgium) Jérôme d'Ambrosio	6	5	8	14	4	6	5	1	11	2	2	113
5	(United Kingdom) Sam Bird	3	1	Ret	7	8	Ret*	4	8	Ret	6	1	103
6	(France) Nicolas Prost	**12**†	**4**	7	2	1	14	6	10	8	7	(10)	88 (89)
7	(France) Jean-Éric Vergne			**14**†*	6*	**18**†*	2*	Ret*	7	**4**	3	16†	70
8	(Portugal) António Félix da Costa		8	Ret	1	6	7	9	11	7			51
9	(France) Loïc Duval					7	9	Ret	3	15	8	3	42
10	(Brazil) Bruno Senna	Ret*	14†*	6	5*	Ret*	5	Ret	17	16	16	4	40
11	(Germany) Daniel Abt	10	10	15	13†	3	**15**	Ret	14	5	Ret	11	32
12	(Germany) Nick Heidfeld	13†	DSQ*	10*	8*	12	11	10	5	3	13	Ret	31
13	(Spain) Jaime Alguersuari	11	9	5	4	11	8	Ret	12	13			30
14	(France) Stéphane Sarrazin	9	12	Ret	10	Ret	10	7	6	14	10	**15**	22
15	(United States) Scott Speed					2	Ret	12	13				18
16	(France) Franck Montagny	2	DSQ										18
17	(India) Karun Chandhok	5	6	13	Ret	14	12	13	18	12	12	13	18
18	(France) Charles Pic	4				17	16	8	15*				16
19	(Spain) Oriol Servià	7	7	9	9								16
20	(Italy) Jarno Trulli	Ret	16	4	Ret	15	Ret	11	**19**†	18†	15	Ret	15
21	(Mexico) Salvador Durán			16*	DSQ	10*	Ret	Ret*	16	6	17	8	13
22	(United Kingdom) Oliver Turvey										9*	9*	4
23	(Italy) Vitantonio Liuzzi					16	13	NC	9	17			2
24	(Japan) Takuma Sato	Ret											2
25	(United Kingdom) Justin Wilson									10			1
26	(China) Ho-Pin Tung	16	11		11								0
27	(Switzerland) Simona de Silvestro										11	12	0
28	(Spain) Antonio García			11						19			0
29	(Italy) Michela Cerruti	14	Ret	12	Ret								0
30	(United States) Marco Andretti				12								0
31	(United States) Matthew Brabham		13	Ret									0
32	(Switzerland) Fabio Leimer										14	Ret	0
33	(Switzerland) Alex Fontana										Ret	14	0
34	(United Kingdom) Katherine Legge	15*	15*										0
35	(Japan) Sakon Yamamoto										Ret*	Ret	0
Pos.	Driver	BEI (China)	PUT (Malaysia)	PDE (Uruguay)	BUE (Argentina)	MIA (United States)	LBH (United States)	MCO (Monaco)	BER (Germany)	MSC (Russia)	LDN (United Kingdom)		Pts

Colour	Result
Gold	Winner
Silver	Second place
Bronze	Third place
Green	Points classification
Blue	Non-points classification
Blue	Non-classified finish (NC)
Purple	Retired, not classified (Ret)
Red	Did not qualify (DNQ)
Red	Did not pre-qualify (DNPQ)
Black	Disqualified (DSQ)
White	Did not start (DNS)
White	Withdrew (WD)
White	Race cancelled (C)
Blank	Did not practice (DNP)
Blank	Did not arrive (DNA)
Blank	Excluded (EX)

**Bold** – Pole
Italics – Fastest Lap
* – FanBoost
(parentheses) – Round dropped from total

Notes

† – Drivers did not finish the race, but were classified as they completed more than 90% of the race distance.

=== Teams' Championship ===
The points system was the same as the Drivers' Championship, except that all rounds counted towards the total.

Pos.	Team	No.	BEI (China)	PUT (Malaysia)	PDE (Uruguay)	BUE (Argentina)	MIA (United States)	LBH (United States)	MCO (Monaco)	BER (Germany)	MSC (Russia)	LDN (United Kingdom)		Points
1	(France) e.dams Renault	8	**12**†	**4**	7	2	1	14	6	10	8	7	10	232
1	(France) e.dams Renault	9	Ret	3	1	**Ret**	13	4	**1**	2*	9*	**1**	5*	232
2	(United States) Dragon Racing	6	7	7	9	9	7	9	Ret	3	15	8	3	171
2	(United States) Dragon Racing	7	6	5	8	14	4	6	5	1	11	2	2	171
3	(Germany) Audi Sport ABT	11	1*	2	3	Ret	9	3	2	DSQ	2*	4	6	165
3	(Germany) Audi Sport ABT	66	10	10	15	13†	3	**15**	Ret	14	5	Ret	11	165
4	(China) NEXTEV TCR	88	16	11	11	11	17	16	8	15*	19	9*	9*	152
4	(China) NEXTEV TCR	99	8	Ret	2	3	5	1*	3*	4*	1*	5*	7*	152
5	(United Kingdom) Virgin Racing	2	3	1	Ret	7	8	Ret*	4	8	Ret	6	1	133
5	(United Kingdom) Virgin Racing	3	11	9	5	4	11	8	Ret	12	13	14	Ret	133
6	(United States) Andretti	27	2	DSQ	**14**†*	6*	**18**†*	2*	Ret*	7	**4**	3	16†	119
6	(United States) Andretti	28	4	13	Ret	12	2	Ret	12	13	10	11	12	119
7	(Japan) Amlin Aguri	55	Ret	8	Ret	1	6	7	9	11	7	Ret*	Ret	66
7	(Japan) Amlin Aguri	77	15*	15*	16*	DSQ	10*	Ret	Ret*	16	6	17	8	66
8	(India) Mahindra Racing	5	5	6	13	Ret	14	12	13	18	12	12	13	58
8	(India) Mahindra Racing	21	Ret*	14†*	6	5*	Ret*	5	Ret	17	16	16	4	58
9	(Monaco) Venturi	23	13†	DSQ*	10*	8*	12	11	10	5	3	13	Ret	53
9	(Monaco) Venturi	30	9	12	Ret	10	Ret	10	7	6	14	10	**15**	53
10	(Switzerland) Trulli	10	Ret	16	4	Ret	15	Ret	11	**19**†	18†	15	Ret	17
10	(Switzerland) Trulli	18	14	Ret	12	Ret	16	13	NC	9	17	Ret	14	17
Pos.	Team	No.	BEI (China)	PUT (Malaysia)	PDE (Uruguay)	BUE (Argentina)	MIA (United States)	LBH (United States)	MCO (Monaco)	BER (Germany)	MSC (Russia)	LDN (United Kingdom)		Points

Colour	Result
Gold	Winner
Silver	Second place
Bronze	Third place
Green	Points classification
Blue	Non-points classification
Blue	Non-classified finish (NC)
Purple	Retired, not classified (Ret)
Red	Did not qualify (DNQ)
Red	Did not pre-qualify (DNPQ)
Black	Disqualified (DSQ)
White	Did not start (DNS)
White	Withdrew (WD)
White	Race cancelled (C)
Blank	Did not practice (DNP)
Blank	Did not arrive (DNA)
Blank	Excluded (EX)

**Bold** – Pole
Italics – Fastest Lap
* – FanBoost

Notes

† – Drivers did not finish the race, but were classified as they completed more than 90% of the race distance.
