= 2015 Miami ePrix =

- Race 5 of 11 of the 2014–15 Formula E season
- Layout of the Biscayne Bay Street Circuit

Race details
- Date: March 14, 2015
- Official name: 2015 FIA Formula E Miami ePrix
- Location: Miami, United States
- Course: Street circuit
- Course length: 2.17 km (1.35 miles)
- Distance: 39 laps, 84.6 km (53.7 miles)
- Weather: Warm and sunny with temperatures reaching up to 77.5 °F (25.3 °C); wind speeds approaching speeds of 20.8 miles per hour (33.5 km/h)

Pole position
Driver	(France) Jean-Éric Vergne	Andretti
- Time: 1:05.953

Fastest lap
Driver	(Brazil) Nelson Piquet Jr.	China Racing
- Time: 1:07.969 on lap 29

Podium
First	(France) Nicolas Prost	e.dams-Renault
Second	(United States) Scott Speed	Andretti
Third	(Germany) Daniel Abt	Audi Sport ABT

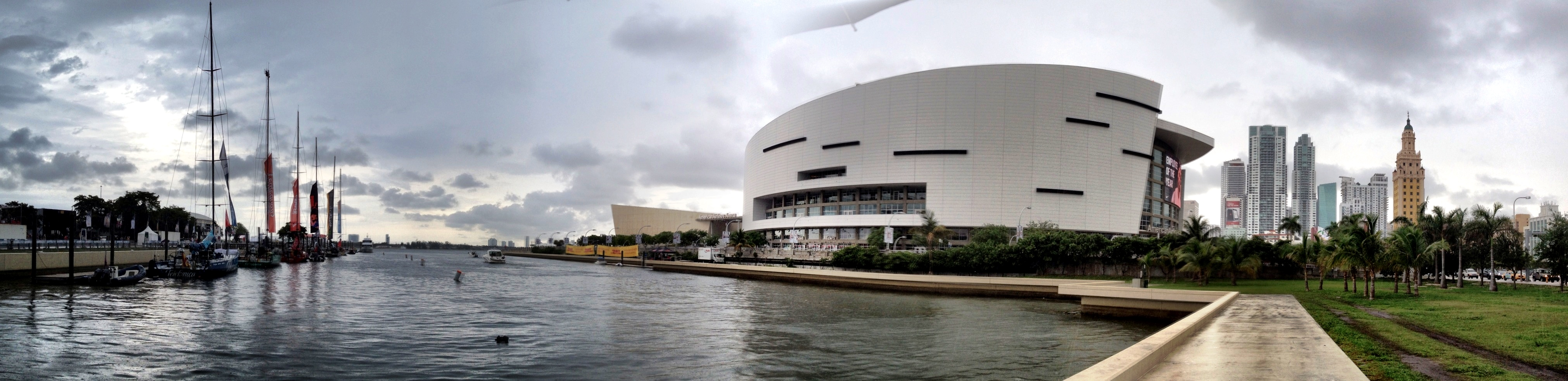
Biscayne Bay next to the American Airlines Arena

The 2015 Miami ePrix, formally the 2015 FIA Formula E Miami ePrix, was a Formula E motor race held on March 14, 2015 at the Biscayne Bay Street Circuit, Miami, United States. It was the fifth championship race of the single-seater, electrically powered racing car series' inaugural season. The race was won by Nicolas Prost. Miami was subsequently dropped from the Formula E schedule for the 2015–16 season, before the return in 2025 held at the Homestead–Miami Speedway.

== Report ==
=== Circuit ===
The Biscayne Bay Street Circuit was located in the heart of Downtown Miami, running along the coast of Biscayne Bay, in addition to making its way underneath the MacArthur Causeway and around the AmericanAirlines Arena, the home of NBA basketball team Miami Heat. The track features eight turns. Production of the temporary street circuit was done by track design company Ayesa.

Franck Montagny, Andretti: "We can expect a very good event there because, looking at the track, there will be quite a few long straights and slow corners so this will help for overtaking for sure. Turns 1, 2 and 3 will be the tricky part of the circuit where we shall have to look after the car and be careful of contact, for example. It looks as though we shall be able to attack at turns 4, 5, 6, 7, 8 and in to 1 - these are the corners to make some moves on."

=== Background ===
After the previous race in Buenos Aires, four driver changes took place. The first was Loïc Duval, replacing Oriol Servià at Dragon. The second was Scott Speed, replacing Marco Andretti at Andretti. Speed was the fourth driver in five races to drive the second car for Andretti. The third was Charles Pic returning to the series with China Racing, replacing Ho-Pin Tung. Pic had previously competed for Andretti in the first round in Beijing. Finally, Vitantonio Liuzzi replaced Michela Cerruti at Trulli GP.

Salvador Durán, Jean-Éric Vergne, and Bruno Senna were voted to receive the FanBoost, giving an extra 30 kWh for five seconds per car.

== Classification ==
=== Qualifying ===
Pos.	No.	Driver	Team	Time	Gap	Grid
1	27	(France) Jean-Éric Vergne	Andretti	1:05.953		1
2	99	(Brazil) Nelson Piquet Jr.	China Racing	1:06.003	+0.050	7^{1}
3	8	(France) Nicolas Prost	e.dams-Renault	1:06.167	+0.214	2
4	2	(United Kingdom) Sam Bird	Virgin Racing	1:06.170	+0.217	3
5	66	(Germany) Daniel Abt	Audi Sport ABT	1:06.255	+0.302	4
6	30	(France) Stéphane Sarrazin	Venturi	1:06.389	+0.436	5
7	11	(Brazil) Lucas di Grassi	Audi Sport ABT	1:06.424	+0.471	6
8	7	(Belgium) Jérôme d'Ambrosio	Dragon Racing	1:06.502	+0.549	8
9	3	(Spain) Jaime Alguersuari	Virgin Racing	1:06.503	+0.550	9
10	23	(Germany) Nick Heidfeld	Venturi	1:06.510	+0.557	19^{2}
11	28	(United States) Scott Speed	Andretti	1:06.527	+0.574	10
12	18	(Italy) Vitantonio Liuzzi	Trulli	1:06.836	+0.883	11
13	77	(Mexico) Salvador Durán	Amlin Aguri	1:06.888	+0.935	12
14	9	(Switzerland) Sébastien Buemi	e.dams-Renault	1:07.037	+1.084	13
15	10	(Italy) Jarno Trulli	Trulli	1:07.163	+1.210	14
16	5	(India) Karun Chandhok	Mahindra Racing	1:07.223	+1.270	20^{3}
17	21	(Brazil) Bruno Senna	Mahindra Racing	1:07.283	+1.330	15
18	55	(Portugal) António Félix da Costa	Amlin Aguri	1:07.678	+1.725	16
19	88	(France) Charles Pic	China Racing	1:08.243	+2.290	17
20	6	(France) Loïc Duval	Dragon Racing	1:09.454	+3.501	18

Notes:

- ^1 –Nelson Piquet Jr. received a five-place grid penalty for speeding under yellow flags in the previous race.
- ^2 –Nick Heidfeld was excluded for exceeding the maximum power usage.
- ^3 –Karun Chandhok was excluded for exceeding the maximum power usage.

=== Race ===
Nicolas Prost won ahead of Scott Speed, while Daniel Abt finished third despite leading on the penultimate lap.

Pos.	No.	Driver	Team	Laps	Time/Retired	Grid	Points
1	8	(France) Nicolas Prost	e.dams-Renault	39	46:12.349	2	25
2	28	(United States) Scott Speed	Andretti	39	+0.433s	10	18
3	66	(Germany) Daniel Abt	Audi Sport ABT	39	+5.518s	4	15
4	7	(Belgium) Jérôme d'Ambrosio	Dragon Racing	39	+5.941s	8	12
5	99	(Brazil) Nelson Piquet Jr.	China Racing	39	+6.426s	7	10+2^{1}
6	55	(Portugal) António Félix da Costa	Amlin Aguri	39	+8.754s	16	8
7	6	(France) Loïc Duval	Dragon Racing	39	+9.498s	18	6
8	2	(United Kingdom) Sam Bird	Virgin Racing	39	+19.817s	3	4
9	11	(Brazil) Lucas di Grassi	Audi Sport ABT	39	+20.631s	6	2
10	77	(Mexico) Salvador Durán	Amlin Aguri	39	+24.587s	12	1
11	3	(Spain) Jaime Alguersuari	Virgin Racing	39	+43.883s	9	
12	23	(Germany) Nick Heidfeld	Venturi	39	+47.878s	19	
13	9	(Switzerland) Sébastien Buemi	e.dams-Renault	39	+1:04.587s	13	
14	5	(India) Karun Chandhok	Mahindra Racing	39	+1:23.539s	20	
15	10	(Italy) Jarno Trulli	Trulli	38	+1 lap	14	
16	18	(Italy) Vitantonio Liuzzi	Trulli	38	+1 lap	11	
17	88	(France) Charles Pic	China Racing	38	+1 lap	17	
18	27	(France) Jean-Éric Vergne	Andretti	37	Collision Damage	1	3^{2}
Ret	30	(France) Stéphane Sarrazin	Venturi	31	Suspension	5	
Ret	21	(Brazil) Bruno Senna	Mahindra Racing	25	Suspension	15	

Notes:

- ^1 – Two points for fastest lap.
- ^2 – Three points for winning qualifying.

== Standings after the race ==
Drivers' Championship standings

Pos	Driver	Points
1	(France) Nicolas Prost	67
2	(Brazil) Lucas di Grassi	60
3	(United Kingdom) Sam Bird	52
4	(Brazil) Nelson Piquet Jr.	49
5	(Switzerland) Sébastien Buemi	43

Teams' Championship standings

Pos	Constructor	Points
1	(France) e.dams-Renault	110
2	(Germany) Audi Sport ABT	79
3	(United Kingdom) Virgin Racing	78
4	(United States) Andretti	62
5	(United States) Dragon Racing	56

- Notes: Only the top five positions are included for both sets of standings.

Previous race: 2015 Buenos Aires ePrix	FIA Formula E Championship; 2014–15 season	Next race: 2015 Long Beach ePrix
Previous race: N/A	Miami ePrix	Next race: 2025 Miami ePrix
