= 2015 Moscow ePrix =

- Race 9 of 11 of the 2014–15 Formula E season
- Layout of the Moscow Street Circuit

Race details
- Date: June 6, 2015
- Official name: 2015 FIA Formula E DHL Moscow e-Prix
- Location: Moscow, Russia
- Course: Temporary circuit
- Course length: 2.39 km (1.49 miles)
- Distance: 35 laps, 83.65 km (52.15 miles)

Pole position
Driver	(France) Jean-Éric Vergne	Andretti Autosport
- Time: 1:09.429

Fastest lap
Driver	(Switzerland) Sébastien Buemi	e.dams-Renault
- Time: 1:11.679 on lap 32

Podium
First	(Brazil) Nelson Piquet Jr.	NEXTEV TCR
Second	(Brazil) Lucas di Grassi	Audi Sport ABT
Third	(Germany) Nick Heidfeld	Venturi GP

The 2015 Moscow ePrix, formally known as the 2015 Formula E DHL Moscow ePrix, was a Formula E motor race that took place on 6 June 2015 on the Moscow Street Circuit in Moscow, Russia. It was the ninth round of the 2014–15 Formula E season.

== Background ==
On 3 February 2015, it was announced that the newly founded Formula E, a class of auto racing for one-make, single-seater, electrically powered racing cars, was set to race in Moscow on a street circuit near the Kremlin, on the north bank of the Moskva River.

Coming into the race from Berlin a fortnight earlier, Nelson Piquet Jr. was leading the championship on 103, with Sébastien Buemi second 2 points behind. They had both jumped Lucas di Grassi, who was disqualified from the Berlin race for having an illegal front wing. Di Grassi sits third on 93 points. The win was inherited by Jérôme d'Ambrosio, who sits in fifth on 77 points, one point behind Nicolas Prost.

== Moscow Street Circuit ==
Moscow Street Circuit was a street circuit which was used on 6 June 2015 during the 2015 Moscow ePrix. The layout placed the track adjacent to the Kremlin, with the main straight running along the Moskva River. Other sites along the track include the Staraya Square, the Red Square, the Moscow Gostiny Dvor, and Saint Basil's Cathedral.

== Report ==
=== Sessions ===
All sessions took place on Saturday, 6 June 2015.

=== Fan Boost ===
Nelson Piquet Jr., Sébastien Buemi and Lucas di Grassi won the Fan Boost. It was Piquet's fourth boost in a row, second in a row for Buemi, and second overall for di Grassi. It was the first for di Grassi since the season opener, and the first time the top 3 in the championship took the Fan Boost advantage.

== Results ==
=== Qualifying ===
Pos.	No.	Driver	Team	Time	Grid
1	27	(France) Jean-Éric Vergne	Andretti Autosport	1:09.429	1
2	99	(Brazil) Nelson Piquet Jr.	NEXTEV TCR	+0.020	2
3	11	(Brazil) Lucas di Grassi	Audi Sport ABT	+0.256	3
4	9	(Switzerland) Sébastien Buemi	e.dams-Renault	+0.397	4
5	7	(Belgium) Jérôme d'Ambrosio	Dragon Racing	+0.538	5
6	8	(France) Nicolas Prost	e.dams-Renault	+0.614	6
7	66	(Germany) Daniel Abt	Audi Sport ABT	+0.646	7
8	23	(Germany) Nick Heidfeld	Venturi GP	+0.669	8
9	10	(Italy) Jarno Trulli	Trulli GP	+0.716	9
10	30	(France) Stéphane Sarrazin	Venturi GP	+0.761	20^{1}
11	77	(Mexico) Salvador Duran	Amlin Aguri	+0.828	10
12	2	(United Kingdom) Sam Bird	Virgin Racing	+0.936	11
13	28	(United Kingdom) Justin Wilson	Andretti Autosport	+0.969	12
14	88	(Spain) Antonio Garcia	NEXTEV TCR	+1.108	13
15	55	(Portugal) António Félix da Costa	Amlin Aguri	+1.188	14
16	21	(Brazil) Bruno Senna	Mahindra Racing	+1.259	15
17	5	(India) Karun Chandhok	Mahindra Racing	+1.268	16
18	3	(Spain) Jaime Alguersuari	Virgin Racing	+1.512	17
19	6	(France) Loïc Duval	Dragon Racing	+1.712	18
20	18	(Italy) Vitantonio Liuzzi	Trulli GP	+2.538	19

- ^1 – Breach of parc ferme rules, excluded.

=== Race ===
Pos.	No.	Driver	Team	Laps	Time/Retired	Grid	Points
1	99	(Brazil) Nelson Piquet Jr.	NEXTEV TCR	35	43:18.867	2	25
2	11	(Brazil) Lucas di Grassi	Audi Sport ABT	35	+2.012	3	18
3	23	(Germany) Nick Heidfeld	Venturi GP	35	+11.548	8	15
4	27	(France) Jean-Éric Vergne	Andretti	35	+12.416	1	12+3^{1}
5	66	(Germany) Daniel Abt	Audi Sport ABT	35	+25.626	7	10
6	77	(Mexico) Salvador Duran	Amlin Aguri	35	+28.960	10	8
7	55	(Portugal) António Félix da Costa	Amlin Aguri	35	+30.529	14	6
8	8	(France) Nicolas Prost	e.dams-Renault	35	+31.556	6	4
9	9	(Switzerland) Sébastien Buemi	e.dams-Renault	35	+40.050^{3}	4	2+2^{2}
10	28	(United Kingdom) Justin Wilson	Andretti Autosport	35	+46.320	12	1
11	7	(Belgium) Jérôme d'Ambrosio	Dragon Racing	35	+51.474	5	
12	5	(India) Karun Chandhok	Mahindra Racing	35	+52.493	16	
13	3	(Spain) Jaime Alguersuari	Virgin Racing	35	+55.810	17	
14	30	(France) Stéphane Sarrazin	Venturi GP	35	+56.715	20	
15	6	(France) Loïc Duval	Dragon Racing	35	+1:18.763^{4}	18	
16	21	(Brazil) Bruno Senna	Mahindra Racing	34	+1 lap	15	
17	18	(Italy) Vitantonio Liuzzi	Trulli GP	34	+1 lap	19	
18	10	(Italy) Jarno Trulli	Trulli GP	32	+3 laps	9	
19	88	(Spain) Antonio Garcia	NEXTEV TCR	32	+3 laps	13	
Ret	2	(United Kingdom) Sam Bird	Virgin Racing	24	Brakes	11	

Notes:

- ^1 - Three points for pole position.
- ^2 - Two points for fastest lap.
- ^3 - Sebastian Buemi received a drive through penalty converted into a 29-second penalty for an unsafe pit stop release.
- ^4 - Loic Duval received a drive through penalty converted into a 29-seconds time penalty for causing a collision.

== Standings after the race ==
Drivers or teams listed in bold were still able to take the respective title.

Drivers' Championship standings

Pos	Driver	Points
1	(Brazil) **Nelson Piquet Jr.**	128
2	(Brazil) **Lucas di Grassi**	111
3	(Switzerland) **Sébastien Buemi**	105
4	(France) **Nicolas Prost**	82
5	(Belgium) **Jérôme d'Ambrosio**	77

Constructors' Championship standings

Pos	Constructor	Points
1	(France) **e.dams Renault**	187
2	(Germany) **Audi Sport ABT**	143
3	(China) **NEXTEV TCR**	132
4	(United States) **Dragon Racing**	116
5	(United States) **Andretti Autosport**	104

- Note: Only the top five positions are included for both sets of standings.

Previous race: 2015 Berlin ePrix	FIA Formula E Championship; 2014–15 season	Next race: 2015 London ePrix
Previous race: N/A	Moscow ePrix	Next race: N/A
