= Team Aguri =

International motor racing team

(Japan) Team Aguri
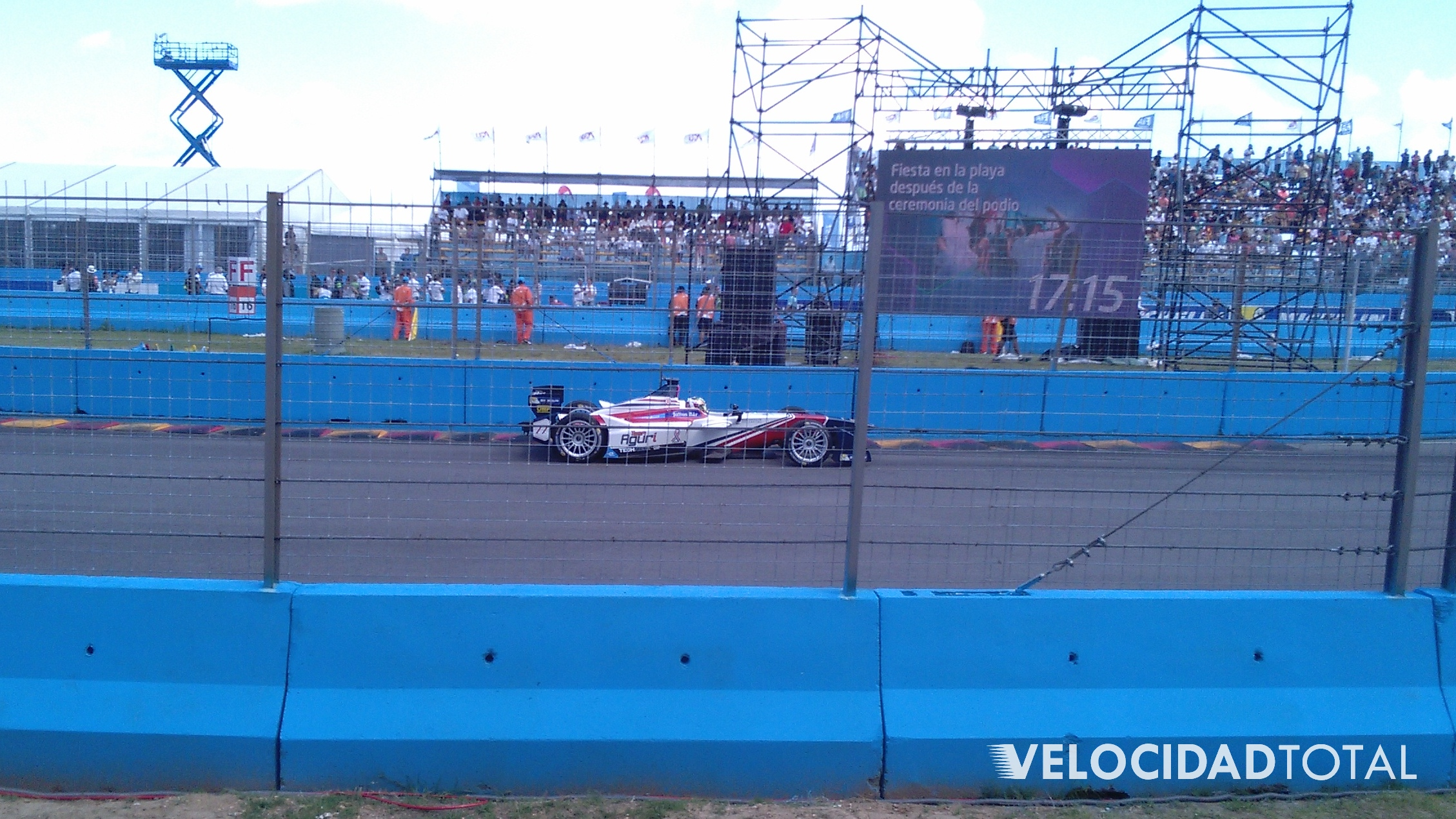
- Founded: 2013
- Folded: July 3, 2016
- Team principal(s): Aguri Suzuki; Mark Preston
- Former series: Formula E
- Noted drivers: (Japan) Takuma Sato (Portugal) António Félix da Costa (Japan) Sakon Yamamoto (United Kingdom) Katherine Legge (Mexico) Salvador Durán (Germany) René Rast (France) Nathanaël Berthon (China) Ma Qinghua

Team Aguri, formerly Amlin Aguri and officially the Team Aguri Formula E Team, was an international motor racing team founded by former Formula One and 24 Hours of Le Mans driver Aguri Suzuki (Executive Chairman) and Mark Preston (Team Principal) to compete in the FIA Formula E Championship for electric cars. The team was based in Tokyo, Japan, and was in a technical partnership with McLaren. At the end of the 2015–16 season, the team was sold to China Media Capital and renamed Techeetah.

== Team history ==
Team Aguri was the creation of Suzuki and Preston, who previously created the Super Aguri F1 team in just 100 days, which competed in Formula One between 2006 and 2008. On 1 November 2013, Team Aguri reached an agreement with the FIA to become the sixth of ten teams to sign up to race in the inaugural season of the Formula E series.

Today is a new chapter for the Super Aguri name and I'm proud that our team will represent Japan in the inaugural Formula E series. Zero emissions racing is a progressive concept for the motorsport industry, and after more than 40 years as both a driver and team owner, I see Formula E as a great stride towards the future.

— Aguri Suzuki, FIA Formula E

=== 2014–15 season ===
It was announced on 27 June 2014 that the first female driver to drive in Formula E would be Katherine Legge from Great Britain. The team also announced an agreement with Amlin for the insurance company to become the title sponsor of the team, which would compete as "Amlin Aguri". On 2 July 2014, António Félix da Costa from Portugal was confirmed as the second driver. It was announced that Takuma Sato would fill in for the team at the first round in Beijing, due to Félix da Costa having previous commitments in the DTM series. Salvador Durán replaced Legge from the Punta del Este round. Félix da Costa took the team's first win in Buenos Aires, and the team ultimately finished in seventh place in the teams' championship.

Takuma is a proven driver and his presence will provide unity and experience for the team. He has great knowledge of how to race on street circuits, which will also be an important attribute for us.

— Team Chairman Aguri Suzuki

=== 2015–16 season ===
On 24 June 2015 ahead of the London ePrix, Team Principal Mark Preston confirmed that team would continue to use the McLaren powertrain from the inaugural Formula E season in the 2015–16 season, to focus development on other areas of the car. In doing so they became the first team to take this approach, in the hope that the older powertrains would provide greater reliability than their rivals while exploring other areas where performance gains could be made, such as software.

Speaking to Current E, Preston commented: "We're going to stay with the current car. Because the battery is not changing (it's going to be refreshed), that means that we've only got the same amount of power in the race and therefore there is no real difference in the race mode. And the gearbox is fine. There's 170kW that we can use, but the calculation says that if you can only just do the race at 150kW, then you're not going to be able to suddenly do the whole race at 170kW. You're going to have to mix and match. At McLaren myself and Peter actually carried over one of the cars one year and came second in the championship by one point from Ferrari, so we know it's possible".

The team would be renamed to "Team Aguri", Amlin having terminated their sponsorship of the team after the conclusion of the first season.

Ultimately, the team struggled to compete against its rivals with new powertrains, failing to score any podium finishes and slipping to eighth in the teams' championship. At the end of the season, the team was sold to China Media Capital and renamed Techeetah; several key management figures would remain at the team, but Aguri Suzuki would step down. At the time of its purchase, the team was in talks with Renault e.Dams to secure a customer powertrain supply for the upcoming season.

==== Testing ====
On 10–11 August 2015, Aguri had its first official test in the series' second season at Donington Park with Salvador Durán and Formula Renault 3.5 driver Tom Dillmann driving the Team Aguri car. On day one, Durán ended up fifth fastest with a time of 1:32.549 whereas Dillmann only completed two laps. On day two, only Dillmann set a time – tenth with a lap time of 1:32.369. On 17–18 August 2015, the second test took place with WEC driver Nicolas Lapierre driving the first day and GP2 driver Nathanaël Berthon on day two. Lapierre managed ninth with a lap time of 1:32.694, 2.5 seconds slower than the fastest time, set by Abt driver Daniel Abt. Berthon set a time of 1:31.185, good enough for eighth place on the day.

== Results ==
Year	Chassis	Powertrain	Tyres	No.	Drivers	1	2	3	4	5	6	7	8	9	10	11	Points	T.C.
Amlin Aguri
2014–15	Spark SRT01-e	SRT01-e^{1}	M			BEI	PUT	PDE	BUE	MIA	LBH	MCO	BER	MSC	LON		66	7th
2014–15	Spark SRT01-e	SRT01-e^{1}	M	55	(Japan) Takuma Sato	Ret											66	7th
2014–15	Spark SRT01-e	SRT01-e^{1}	M	55	(Portugal) António Félix da Costa		8	Ret	1	6	7	9	11	7			66	7th
2014–15	Spark SRT01-e	SRT01-e^{1}	M	55	(Japan) Sakon Yamamoto										Ret	Ret	66	7th
2014–15	Spark SRT01-e	SRT01-e^{1}	M	77	(United Kingdom) Katherine Legge	15	15										66	7th
2014–15	Spark SRT01-e	SRT01-e^{1}	M	77	(Mexico) Salvador Durán			16	DSQ	10	Ret	Ret	16	6	17	8	66	7th
Team Aguri
2015–16	Spark SRT01-e	SRT01-e^{2}	M			BEI	PUT	PDE	BUE	MEX	LBH	PAR	BER	LON			32	8th
2015–16	Spark SRT01-e	SRT01-e^{2}	M	55	(Portugal) António Félix da Costa	Ret	6	6	Ret	Ret	Ret	8		6	11		32	8th
2015–16	Spark SRT01-e	SRT01-e^{2}	M	55	(Germany) René Rast								NC				32	8th
2015–16	Spark SRT01-e	SRT01-e^{2}	M	77	(France) Nathanaël Berthon	8	15	14									32	8th
2015–16	Spark SRT01-e	SRT01-e^{2}	M	77	(Mexico) Salvador Durán				Ret	15	14						32	8th
2015–16	Spark SRT01-e	SRT01-e^{2}	M	77	(China) Ma Qinghua							Ret	14	11	12		32	8th
2016–17: Techeetah

Notes

- ^1 – In the inaugural season, all teams were supplied with a spec powertrain by McLaren.
- ^2 – The team opted to revert to the previous McLaren motor used in the inaugural season.

== See also ==
- Super Aguri F1
- Autobacs Racing Team Aguri
