= 2015 Long Beach ePrix =

- Race 6 of 11 of the 2014–15 Formula E season
- Layout of the Long Beach Formula E street circuit

Race details
- Date: April 4, 2015
- Official name: 2015 FIA Formula E Long Beach ePrix
- Location: Long Beach Street Circuit, United States
- Course: Street circuit
- Course length: 2.131 km (1.324 miles)
- Distance: 39 laps, 83.1 km (51.6 miles)
- Weather: Temperatures reaching up to 86 °F (30 °C); wind speeds approaching speeds of 16.1 miles per hour (25.9 km/h)

Pole position
Driver	(Germany) Daniel Abt	Abt Sportsline
- Time: 56.937

Fastest lap
Driver	(France) Nicolas Prost	e.dams Renault
- Time: 58.973 on lap 34

Podium
First	(Brazil) Nelson Piquet Jr.	China Racing
Second	(France) Jean-Éric Vergne	Andretti
Third	(Brazil) Lucas di Grassi	Audi Sport ABT

The 2015 Long Beach ePrix was a Formula E motor race held on April 4, 2015 in Long Beach, United States on a revised version of a street circuit usually used for the Long Beach Street Circuit. It was the sixth championship race of the single-seater, electrically powered racing car series' inaugural season.

China Racing driver Nelson Piquet Jr. became the sixth different winner in as many races, and as a result moved up to second place in the drivers' championship, one point in arrears of Audi Sport ABT's Lucas di Grassi. Di Grassi also finished in the podium placings, in third place, just behind Andretti driver Jean-Éric Vergne. Nicolas Prost (e.dams-Renault) held the lead of the championship into the weekend, finished down in 14th position after serving a drive-through penalty.

== Report ==
=== Background ===
For the first time in the championship, the driver lineup was exactly the same as for the previous race in Miami. Fanboost was awarded to Nelson Piquet Jr., Jean-Éric Vergne and Sam Bird. Attendance at the free event was approximately 23,000.

== Classification ==
=== Qualifying ===
Pos.	No.	Driver	Team	Time	Gap	Grid
1	66	(Germany) Daniel Abt	Audi Sport ABT	56.937	—	1
2	8	(France) Nicolas Prost	e.dams-Renault	56.944	+0.007	2
3	99	(Brazil) Nelson Piquet Jr.	China Racing	56.974	+0.037	3
4	11	(Brazil) Lucas di Grassi	Audi Sport ABT	57.083	+0.146	4
5	27	(France) Jean-Éric Vergne	Andretti	57.106	+0.169	5
6	28	(United States) Scott Speed	Andretti	57.156	+0.219	6
7	55	(Portugal) António Félix da Costa	Amlin Aguri	57.182	+0.245	7
8	7	(Belgium) Jérôme d'Ambrosio	Dragon Racing	57.184	+0.247	8
9	30	(France) Stéphane Sarrazin	Venturi	57.261	+0.324	9
10	9	(Switzerland) Sébastien Buemi	e.dams-Renault	57.288	+0.351	10
11	2	(United Kingdom) Sam Bird	Virgin Racing	57.304	+0.367	11
12	21	(Brazil) Bruno Senna	Mahindra Racing	57.347	+0.410	12
13	10	(Italy) Jarno Trulli	Trulli	57.417	+0.480	13
14	3	(Spain) Jaime Alguersuari	Virgin Racing	57.449	+0.512	14
15	23	(Germany) Nick Heidfeld	Venturi	57.508	+0.571	15
16	88	(France) Charles Pic	China Racing	57.818	+0.881	16
17	6	(France) Loïc Duval	Dragon Racing	57.905	+0.968	17
18	5	(India) Karun Chandhok	Mahindra Racing	57.921	+0.984	18
19	77	(Mexico) Salvador Durán	Amlin Aguri	57.950	+1.013	19
20	18	(Italy) Vitantonio Liuzzi	Trulli	1:12.813	+15.876	20

=== Race ===
Pos.	No.	Driver	Team	Laps	Time/Retired	Grid	Points
1	99	(Brazil) Nelson Piquet Jr.	China Racing	39	46:01.971	3	25
2	27	(France) Jean-Éric Vergne	Andretti	39	+1.705s	5	18
3	11	(Brazil) Lucas di Grassi	Audi Sport ABT	39	+2.994s	4	15
4	9	(Switzerland) Sébastien Buemi	e.dams-Renault	39	+3.518s	10	12
5	21	(Brazil) Bruno Senna	Mahindra Racing	39	+8.844s	12	10
6	7	(Belgium) Jérôme d'Ambrosio	Dragon Racing	39	+13.460s	8	8
7	55	(Portugal) António Félix da Costa	Amlin Aguri	39	+16.171s	7	6
8	3	(Spain) Jaime Alguersuari	Virgin Racing	39	+17.975s	14	4
9	6	(France) Loïc Duval	Dragon Racing	39	+18.436s	17	2
10	30	(France) Stéphane Sarrazin	Venturi	39	+20.418s	9	1
11	23	(Germany) Nick Heidfeld	Venturi	39	+21.326s	15	
12	5	(India) Karun Chandhok	Mahindra Racing	39	+32.917s	18	
13	18	(Italy) Vitantonio Liuzzi	Trulli	39	+38.592s	20	
14	8	(France) Nicolas Prost	e.dams-Renault	39	+42.375s	2	2^{1}
15	66	(Germany) Daniel Abt	Audi Sport ABT	39	+44.361s	1	3^{2}
16	88	(France) Charles Pic	China Racing	39	+58.125s	16	
Ret	77	(Mexico) Salvador Durán	Amlin Aguri	27	Mechanical	19	
Ret	2	(United Kingdom) Sam Bird	Virgin Racing	22	Suspension	11	
Ret	10	(Italy) Jarno Trulli	Trulli	7	Collision	13	
Ret	28	(United States) Scott Speed	Andretti	3	Accident	6	

Notes

- ^1 – Two points for fastest lap.
- ^2 – Three points for pole position.

== Standings after the race ==
Drivers' Championship standings

Pos	Driver	Points
1	(Brazil) Lucas di Grassi	75
2	(Brazil) Nelson Piquet Jr.	74
3	(France) Nicolas Prost	69
4	(Switzerland) Sébastien Buemi	55
5	(United Kingdom) Sam Bird	52

Teams' Championship standings

Pos	Constructor	Points
1	(France) e.dams-Renault	124
2	(Germany) Audi Sport ABT	97
3	(United Kingdom) Virgin Racing	82
4	(United States) Andretti	80
5	China Racing	74

- Notes: Only the top five positions are included for both sets of standings.

Previous race: 2015 Miami ePrix	FIA Formula E Championship; 2014–15 season	Next race: 2015 Monaco ePrix
Previous race: N/A	Long Beach ePrix	Next race: 2016 Long Beach ePrix
