= 2015 Monaco ePrix =

- Race 7 of 11 of the 2014–15 Formula E season
- Layout of the Monaco Formula E street circuit

Race details
- Date: 9 May 2015
- Official name: 2015 FIA Formula E Monaco ePrix
- Location: Monte Carlo, Monaco
- Course: Street circuit
- Course length: 1.765 km (1.097 miles)
- Distance: 47 laps, 82.955 km (51.546 miles)

Pole position
Driver	(Switzerland) Sébastien Buemi	e.dams Renault
- Time: 53.478

Fastest lap
Driver	(France) Jean-Éric Vergne	Andretti
- Time: 55.157 on lap 32

Podium
First	(Switzerland) Sébastien Buemi	e.dams Renault
Second	(Brazil) Lucas di Grassi	Audi Sport ABT
Third	(Brazil) Nelson Piquet Jr.	China Racing

The 2015 Monaco ePrix was a Formula E motor race held on 9 May 2015 on the Circuit de Monaco, a street circuit in Monte Carlo, Monaco. It was the seventh championship race of the single-seater, electrically powered racing car series' inaugural season. The race was won by Sébastien Buemi, who became the first multiple race winner in the series.

== Report ==
=== Background ===
For the second race in a row, the driver lineup was exactly the same as for the previous race. Fanboost was awarded to Nelson Piquet Jr., Jean-Éric Vergne and Salvador Durán.

== Classification ==
=== Qualifying ===
Pos.	No.	Driver	Constructor	Time	Gap	Grid
1	9	(Switzerland) Sébastien Buemi	e.dams-Renault	53.478	—	1
2	11	(Brazil) Lucas di Grassi	Audi Sport ABT	53.669	+0.191	2
3	7	(Belgium) Jérôme d'Ambrosio	Dragon Racing	53.702	+0.224	3
4	99	(Brazil) Nelson Piquet Jr.	NEXTEV TCR	53.712	+0.234	4
5	6	(France) Loïc Duval	Dragon Racing	53.804	+0.326	5
6	66	(Germany) Daniel Abt	Audi Sport ABT	53.891	+0.413	6
7	8	(France) Nicolas Prost	e.dams-Renault	53.909	+0.431	7
8	3	(Spain) Jaime Alguersuari	Virgin Racing	54.021	+0.543	8
9	21	(Brazil) Bruno Senna	Mahindra Racing	54.035	+0.557	9
10	30	(France) Stéphane Sarrazin	Venturi	54.133	+0.655	10
11	77	(Mexico) Salvador Durán	Amlin Aguri	54.175	+0.697	11
12	2	(United Kingdom) Sam Bird	Virgin Racing	54.253	+0.775	12
13	27	(France) Jean-Éric Vergne	Andretti	54.260	+0.782	13
14	10	(Italy) Jarno Trulli	Trulli	54.339	+0.861	14
15	28	(United States) Scott Speed	Andretti	54.347	+0.869	15
16	18	(Italy) Vitantonio Liuzzi	Trulli	54.462	+0.984	16
17	23	(Germany) Nick Heidfeld	Venturi	54.502	+1.024	17
18	88	(France) Charles Pic	NEXTEV TCR	54.652	+1.174	18
19	5	(India) Karun Chandhok	Mahindra Racing	54.858	+1.380	19
20	55	(Portugal) António Félix da Costa	Amlin Aguri	56.938	+3.460	20

=== Race ===
Pos.	No.	Driver	Team	Laps	Time/Retired	Grid	Points
1	9	(Switzerland) Sébastien Buemi	e.dams-Renault	47	48:05.225	1	25+3^{1}
2	11	(Brazil) Lucas di Grassi	Audi Sport ABT	47	+2.154	2	18
3	99	(Brazil) Nelson Piquet Jr.	NEXTEV TCR	47	+4.634	4	15
4	2	(United Kingdom) Sam Bird	Virgin Racing	47	+4.801	12	12
5	7	(Belgium) Jérôme d'Ambrosio	Dragon Racing	47	+5.881	3	10
6	8	(France) Nicolas Prost	e.dams-Renault	47	+11.032	7	8
7	30	(France) Stéphane Sarrazin	Venturi	47	+26.472	10	6
8	88	(France) Charles Pic	NEXTEV TCR	47	+49.538	18	4
9	55	(Portugal) António Félix da Costa	Amlin Aguri	47	+52.658	20	2
10	23	(Germany) Nick Heidfeld	Venturi	47	+52.936	17	1
11	10	(Italy) Jarno Trulli	Trulli	47	+58.984	14	
12	28	(United States) Scott Speed	Andretti	47	+1:14.138^{2}	15	
13	5	(India) Karun Chandhok	Mahindra Racing	46	+1 lap	19	
Ret	18	(Italy) Vitantonio Liuzzi	Trulli	36	Brakes	16	
Ret	27	(France) Jean-Éric Vergne	Andretti	33	Hydraulics	13	2^{3}
Ret	77	(Mexico) Salvador Durán	Amlin Aguri	28	Suspension	11	
Ret	6	(France) Loïc Duval	Dragon Racing	24	Electrical	5	
Ret	66	(Germany) Daniel Abt	Audi Sport ABT	14	Transmission	6	
Ret	3	(Spain) Jaime Alguersuari	Virgin Racing	0	Collision	8	
Ret	21	(Brazil) Bruno Senna	Mahindra Racing	0	Collision	9	

Notes:

- ^1 – Three points for pole position.
- ^2 – Scott Speed received a drive through penalty converted into a 33-second time penalty for exceeding maximum power usage.
- ^3 – Two points for fastest lap.

== Standings after the race ==
Drivers' Championship standings

Pos	Driver	Points
1	(Brazil) Lucas di Grassi	93
2	(Brazil) Nelson Piquet Jr.	89
3	(Switzerland) Sébastien Buemi	83
4	(France) Nicolas Prost	77
5	(United Kingdom) Sam Bird	64

Teams' Championship standings

Pos	Constructor	Points
1	(France) e.dams-Renault	160
2	(Germany) Audi Sport ABT	115
3	(United Kingdom) Virgin Racing	94
4	(China) NEXTEV TCR	93
5	(United States) Andretti	82

- Notes: Only the top five positions are included for both sets of standings.

Previous race: 2015 Long Beach ePrix	FIA Formula E Championship; 2014–15 season	Next race: 2015 Berlin ePrix
Previous race: N/A	Monaco ePrix	Next race: 2017 Monaco ePrix
