= 2015 London ePrix =

The 2015 London ePrix, officially known as the 2015 Visa London ePrix, was two Formula E motor races that took place on the 27 and 28 June 2015 on the Battersea Park Street Circuit in Battersea Park, London. It was the tenth and eleventh rounds of the 2014–15 Formula E season, the last of the inaugural season of Formula E.

== Background to race weekend ==
In December 2013, the FIA approved a Formula E calendar of ten races, of which London was the 10th and last race. Wandsworth Council eventually approved of the circuit and also announced that it would be a double race on the 19 February 2015.

There was some controversy over the park circuit which took place in a Grade II* listed park with opposition to a public park being disrupted to accommodate the races. Battersea Park was closed to the public for four days with a three-week disruption period and a decision has yet to be taken on a repeat race.

Since the previous ePrix in Moscow, five driver changes were made. The first of these was that Jaime Alguersuari had been replaced by Fabio Leimer, as the Spaniard was forced to withdraw due to health issues. He was the first of three new Swiss drivers (taking the total 4), with Alex Fontana and Simona de Silvestro replacing Vitantonio Liuzzi and Justin Wilson respectively. De Silvestro's appearance in Formula E makes her the eighth driver to drive for Andretti this season, the sixth in the second car, and the third female driver in series history. Also making their first appearance was Sakon Yamamoto, who replaces António Félix da Costa as the Portuguese driver is driving for BMW in DTM, and Oliver Turvey, who replaces Charles Pic, becoming the fourth different driver to drive the second car for NEXTEV Team China Racing.

== Race One ==
2015 London ePrix
- Race 10 of 11 of the 2014–15 Formula E season
- Layout of the Battersea Park Street Circuit

Race details
- Date: June 27, 2015
- Official name: Visa London ePrix
- Location: Battersea Park Street Circuit, Battersea, London, United Kingdom
- Course: Temporary circuit
- Course length: 2.925 km (1.818 miles)
- Distance: 29 laps, 84.825 km (52.708 miles)
- Weather: Sunny

Pole position
Driver	(Switzerland) Sébastien Buemi	e.dams-Renault
- Time: 1:24.648

Fastest lap
Driver	(Brazil) Lucas di Grassi	Audi Sport Abt
- Time: 1:28.229 on lap 25

Podium
First	(Switzerland) Sébastien Buemi	e.dams-Renault
Second	(Belgium) Jérôme d'Ambrosio	Dragon Racing
Third	(France) Jean-Éric Vergne	Andretti Autosport

=== Background to Race One ===
After winning the last race in Moscow, Nelson Piquet Jr. led the world championship by 17 points to fellow countryman, Lucas di Grassi. Swiss driver Sébastien Buemi was six points behind di Grassi in third. e.dams Renault topped the teams' championship by 44 points to Audi Sport Abt. NEXTEV Team China Racing was third, 11 further behind Audi Sport Abt.

After exceeding the track limits on multiple occasions in Moscow, Jarno Trulli was handed a five place grid penalty for failing to slow after cutting the chicane.

=== Qualifying ===
Pos.	No.	Driver	Team	Time	Gap	Grid
1	9	(Switzerland) Sébastien Buemi	e.dams-Renault	1:24.648	—	1
2	7	(Belgium) Jérôme d'Ambrosio	Dragon Racing	1:25.104	+0.456	2
3	11	(Brazil) Lucas di Grassi	Audi Sport Abt	1:25.105	+0.457	3
4	99	(Brazil) Nelson Piquet Jr.	NEXTEV TCR	1:25.144	+0.496	4
5	27	(France) Jean-Éric Vergne	Andretti Autosport	1:25.182	+0.534	5
6	8	(France) Nicolas Prost	e.dams-Renault	1:25.258	+0.610	6
7	88	(United Kingdom) Oliver Turvey	NEXTEV TCR	1:25.829	+1.181	7
8	21	(Brazil) Bruno Senna	Mahindra Racing	1:25.879	+1.231	8
9	2	(United Kingdom) Sam Bird	Virgin Racing	1:25.894	+1.246	9
10	77	(Mexico) Salvador Durán	Amlin Aguri	1:25.964	+1.316	10
11	6	(France) Loïc Duval	Dragon Racing	1:25.998	+1.340	11
12	23	(Germany) Nick Heidfeld	Venturi Grand Prix	1:26.128	+1.480	12
13	66	(Germany) Daniel Abt	Audi Sport Abt	1:26.302	+1.654	13
14	30	(France) Stéphane Sarrazin	Venturi Grand Prix	1:26.318	+1.670	14
15	10	(Italy) Jarno Trulli	Trulli GP	1:26.852	+2.204	20^{1}
16	5	(India) Karun Chandhok	Mahindra Racing	1:27.160	+2.512	15
17	28	(Switzerland) Simona de Silvestro	Andretti Autosport	1:27.208	+2.560	16
18	55	(Japan) Sakon Yamamoto	Amlin Aguri	1:27.456	+2.808	17
19	18	(Switzerland) Alex Fontana	Trulli GP	1:28.083	+3.435	18
20	3	(Switzerland) Fabio Leimer	Virgin Racing	1:28.152	+3.504	19

- **^1** – Jarno Trulli was handed a five place penalty for excessive corner cutting in Moscow.

=== Race ===
Pos.	No.	Driver	Team	Laps	Time/Retired	Grid	Points
1	9	(Switzerland) **Sébastien Buemi**	**e.dams-Renault**	29	47:54.784	1	**25+3**^{1}
2	7	(Belgium) **Jérôme d'Ambrosio**	**Dragon Racing**	29	+0.939	2	**18**
3	27	(France) **Jean-Éric Vergne**	**Andretti Autosport**	29	+1.667	5	**15**
4	11	(Brazil) **Lucas di Grassi**	**Audi Sport ABT**	29	+2.409	3	**12+2**^{2}
5	99	(Brazil) **Nelson Piquet Jr.**	**NEXTEV TCR**	29	+7.370	4	**10**
6	2	(United Kingdom) **Sam Bird**	**Virgin Racing**	29	+7.762	9	**8**
7	8	(France) **Nicolas Prost**	**e.dams-Renault**	29	+8.553	6	**6**
8	6	(France) **Loïc Duval**	**Dragon Racing**	29	+9.507	11	**4**
9	88	(United Kingdom) **Oliver Turvey**	**NEXTEV TCR**	29	+10.032	7	**2**
10	30	(France) **Stéphane Sarrazin**	**Venturi Grand Prix**	29	+12.077	14	**1**
11	28	(Switzerland) Simona de Silvestro	Andretti Autosport	29	+15.946	17	
12	5	(India) Karun Chandhok	Mahindra Racing	29	+35.595	16	
13	23	(Germany) Nick Heidfeld	Venturi Grand Prix	29	+41.034	12	
14	3	(Switzerland) Fabio Leimer	Virgin Racing	29	+42.697	20	
15	10	(Italy) Jarno Trulli	Trulli GP	29	+43.273	15	
16	21	(Brazil) Bruno Senna	Mahindra Racing	29	+48.423	8	
17	77	(Mexico) Salvador Duran	Amlin Aguri	29	+1:01.987^{3}	10	
Ret	18	(Switzerland) Alex Fontana	Trulli GP	25	Suspension	19	
Ret	66	(Germany) Daniel Abt	Audi Sport ABT	15	Accident	13	
Ret	55	(Japan) Sakon Yamamoto	Amlin Aguri	15	Battery	18	

- **^1** Three points for pole position.
- **^2** Two points for fastest lap.
- **^3** Salvador Duran received a drive through penalty converted into a 49-second penalty for overuse of power.

=== Standings after the race ===
Drivers or teams listed in bold were still able to take the respective title.

Drivers' Championship standings
Pos	Driver	Points
1	(Brazil) **Nelson Piquet Jr.**	138
2	(Switzerland) **Sébastien Buemi**	133
3	(Brazil) **Lucas di Grassi**	125
4	(Belgium) Jérôme d'Ambrosio	95
5	(France) Nicolas Prost	88

Constructors' Championship standings
Pos	Constructor	Points
1	(France) **e.dams Renault**	221
2	(Germany) Audi Sport ABT	157
3	(China) NEXTEV TCR	144
4	(United States) Dragon Racing	138
5	(United States) Andretti Autosport	119

- Note: Only the top five positions are included for both sets of standings.

== Race Two ==
2015 London ePrix
- Race 11 of 11 of the 2014–15 Formula E season
- Layout of the Battersea Park Street Circuit

Race details
- Date: June 28, 2015
- Official name: Visa London ePrix
- Location: Battersea Park Street Circuit, Battersea, London, United Kingdom
- Course: Temporary circuit
- Course length: 2.925 km (1.818 miles)
- Distance: 29 laps, 84.825 km (52.708 miles)

Pole position
Driver	(France) Stéphane Sarrazin	Venturi
- Time: 1:23.901

Fastest lap
Driver	(United Kingdom) Sam Bird	Virgin Racing
- Time: 1:26.790 on lap 24

Podium
First	(United Kingdom) Sam Bird	Virgin Racing
Second	(Belgium) Jérôme d'Ambrosio	Dragon Racing
Third	(France) Loïc Duval	Dragon Racing

=== Qualifying ===
Pos.	No.	Driver	Team	Time	Gap	Grid
1	30	(France) Stéphane Sarrazin	Venturi Grand Prix	1:23.901	-	1
2	7	(Belgium) Jérôme d'Ambrosio	Dragon Racing	1:23.965	+0.064	2
3	6	(France) Loïc Duval	Dragon Racing	1:24.107	+0.206	3
4	2	(United Kingdom) Sam Bird	Virgin Racing	1:24.241	+0.340	4
5	21	(Brazil) Bruno Senna	Mahindra Racing	1:24.318	+0.417	5
6	9	(Switzerland) Sébastien Buemi	e.dams-Renault	1:24.385	+0.484	6
7	23	(Germany) Nick Heidfeld	Venturi Grand Prix	1:25.494	+1.593	7
8	77	(Mexico) Salvador Duran	Amlin Aguri	1:25.649	+1.748	8
9	18	(Switzerland) Alex Fontana	Trulli GP	1:25.689	+1.788	9
10	10	(Italy) Jarno Trulli	Trulli GP	1:27.093	+3.192	10
11	11	(Brazil) Lucas di Grassi	Audi Sport ABT	1:32.570	+8.669	11
12	88	(United Kingdom) Oliver Turvey	NEXTEV TCR	1:33.626	+9.725	12
13	28	(Switzerland) Simona de Silvestro	Andretti Autosport	1:34.167	+10.266	13
14	27	(France) Jean-Éric Vergne	Andretti Autosport	1:35.032	+11.131	14
15	8	(France) Nicolas Prost	e.dams-Renault	1:35.111	+11.210	15
16	99	(Brazil) Nelson Piquet Jr.	NEXTEV TCR	1:35.284	+11.383	16
17	3	(Switzerland) Fabio Leimer	Virgin Racing	1:35.543	+11.642	17
18	66	(Germany) Daniel Abt	Audi Sport ABT	1:38.473	+14.572	18
19	5	(India) Karun Chandhok	Mahindra Racing	1:41.232	+17.331	19
20	55	(Japan) Sakon Yamamoto	Amlin Aguri	no time	-	20

=== Race ===
Sarrazin won the race from pole, but he was penalized post-race for overusing his allocated energy, handing Bird victory in his home race. Piquet Jr., meanwhile finished seventh and became Formula E's inaugural drivers' champion by one point ahead of Buemi, after the Swiss driver spun on his out lap after changing cars and stuck behind fourth-placed Senna for the remainder of the race, but nevertheless, e.dams secured their inaugural team's championship title.

Pos.	No.	Driver	Team	Laps	Time/Retired	Grid	Points
1	2	(United Kingdom) Sam Bird	Virgin Racing	29	45:48.792	4	25+2^{1}
2	7	(Belgium) Jérôme d'Ambrosio	Dragon Racing	29	+6.973	2	18
3	6	(France) Loïc Duval	Dragon Racing	29	+9.430	3	15
4	21	(Brazil) Bruno Senna	Mahindra Racing	29	+10.147	5	12
5	9	(Switzerland) Sébastien Buemi	e.dams-Renault	29	+10.689	6	10
6	11	(Brazil) Lucas di Grassi	Audi Sport ABT	29	+11.204	11	8
7	99	(Brazil) Nelson Piquet Jr.	NEXTEV TCR	29	+11.561	16	6
8	77	(Mexico) Salvador Duran	Amlin Aguri	29	+12.402	8	4
9	88	(United Kingdom) Oliver Turvey	NEXTEV TCR	29	+14.142	12	2
10	8	(France) Nicolas Prost	e.dams-Renault	29	+14.535	15	1
11	66	(Germany) Daniel Abt	Audi Sport ABT	29	+23.170	18	
12	28	(Switzerland) Simona de Silvestro	Andretti Autosport	29	+24.610	13	
13	5	(India) Karun Chandhok	Mahindra Racing	29	+31.501	19	
14	18	(Switzerland) Alex Fontana	Trulli GP	29	+38.423	9	
15	30	(France) Stéphane Sarrazin	Venturi Grand Prix	29	+48.680^{2}	1	3^{3}
16	27	(France) Jean-Éric Vergne	Andretti Autosport	28	+1 lap	14	
Ret	23	(Germany) Nick Heidfeld	Venturi Grand Prix	23	Gearbox	7	
Ret	3	(Switzerland) Fabio Leimer	Virgin Racing	17	Suspension	17	
Ret	10	(Italy) Jarno Trulli	Trulli GP	14	Brakes	10	
Ret	55	(Japan) Sakon Yamamoto	Amlin Aguri	6	Accident	20	

Notes:

- ^1 – Two points for fastest lap.
- ^2 – Stéphane Sarrazin received a drive through penalty converted into a 49-second penalty for overuse of power.
- ^3 – Three points for pole position.

=== Standings after the race ===
Drivers' Championship standings
Pos	Driver	Points
1	(Brazil) Nelson Piquet Jr.	144
2	(Switzerland) Sébastien Buemi	143
3	(Brazil) Lucas di Grassi	133
4	(Belgium) Jérôme d'Ambrosio	113
5	(United Kingdom) Sam Bird	103

Constructors' Championship standings
Pos	Constructor	Points
1	(France) e.dams Renault	232
2	(United States) Dragon Racing	171
3	(Germany) Audi Sport ABT	165
4	(China) NEXTEV TCR	152
5	(United Kingdom) Virgin Racing	133

- Note: Only the top five positions are included for both sets of standings.

Previous race: 2015 Moscow ePrix	FIA Formula E Championship; 2014–15 season	Next race: 2015 Beijing ePrix; 2015–16 season
Previous race: -	London ePrix	Next race: 2016 London ePrix
