= 2015 Berlin ePrix =

- Race 8 of 11 of the 2014–15 Formula E season
- Layout of the Berlin-Tempelhof Formula E street circuit

Race details
- Date: 23 May 2015
- Official name: 2015 FIA Formula E DHL Berlin ePrix
- Location: Tempelhof airport, Berlin, Germany
- Course: Temporary circuit
- Course length: 2.469 km (1.534 miles)
- Distance: 33 laps, 81.477 km (50.622 miles)

Pole position
Driver	(Italy) Jarno Trulli	Trulli
- Time: 1:21.547

Fastest lap
Driver	(Brazil) Nelson Piquet Jr.	China
- Time: 1:24.435 on lap 20

Podium
First	(Belgium) Jérôme d'Ambrosio	Dragon
Second	(Switzerland) Sébastien Buemi	e.dams
Third	(France) Loïc Duval	Dragon

The 2015 Berlin ePrix, formally known as the 2015 DHL Berlin ePrix, was a Formula E motor race that took place on 23 May 2015 on the purpose-built Tempelhof Airport Street Circuit in Berlin. It was the eighth round of the 2014–15 Formula E season. A special anti-clockwise track was built for the race next to the terminal building of the closed airport, including 17 turns over a distance of 2.469 km (1.534 mi).

Prior to the ePrix, Lucas di Grassi was leading the Drivers' Championship by four points over Nelson Piquet Jr., while e.dams Renault led the Teams' Championship in front of second placed Audi Sport ABT.

Jarno Trulli started the race from pole position, but eventually retired. The race was initially won by championship leader Lucas di Grassi. After di Grassi's car was found to have used a modified front wing, the victory was handed to second-placed Jérôme d'Ambrosio. As a result of the race, Nelson Piquet Jr. took the lead in the drivers' championship.

== Background ==
On 11 July 2013, it was announced that the newly founded Formula E, a class of auto racing for one-make, single-seater, electrically powered racing cars, was set to race in Berlin on the apron of Tempelhof airport, which was closed in October 2008. In April 2014, the race was included in the FIA's final calendar. Prior to the ePrix, Formula One had visited Berlin in 1959 for the German Grand Prix held at the AVUS highway track, a race marred by the death of Frenchman Jean Behra, who died in an accident during a Formula Two support race. Local politicians in Berlin supported the race, with the Senator for Economy, Technology and Research, Cornelia Yzer saying that Berlin "as the capital of electric mobility" was predestined for such an event. However, the Senate of Berlin did not agree to the organiser's plea to be allowed to hold the race at the central Straße des 17. Juni street overlooking the Brandenburg Gate.

Coming into the race from Monaco two weeks earlier, Lucas di Grassi (Audi Sport ABT) was leading the championship with 93 points, four ahead of his compatriot Nelson Piquet Jr. (NEXTEV TCR). Another six points adrift, third placed Sébastien Buemi (e.dams Renault) was the only driver who scored two victories over the course of the season, but less consistent outings prevented him from placing higher up in the standings. In the teams' championship, e.dams Renault on 160 points had a 45-point lead over Audi Sport ABT.

=== The circuit ===
The 2.469 km (1.534 mi) anti-clockwise circuit was designed by Rodrigo Nunes, featuring 17 corners. It was described as a "twisty and challenging circuit" by Formula E driver Nick Heidfeld (Venturi), who also stated that "overtaking will not be easy" due to the nature of the course. Construction of the track started 14 May, nine days prior to the race.

=== World record ===
Between qualifying and the race, a new world record was set for the largest parade of electric vehicles, when 577 cars and scooters took to the track. The parade surpassed the previous record set in September 2014 in Silicon Valley, United States.

== Report ==
All sessions took place on Saturday, 23 May 2015, in contrast to Formula One, where all sessions are divided up over a three- to four-day period.

=== Free practice ===
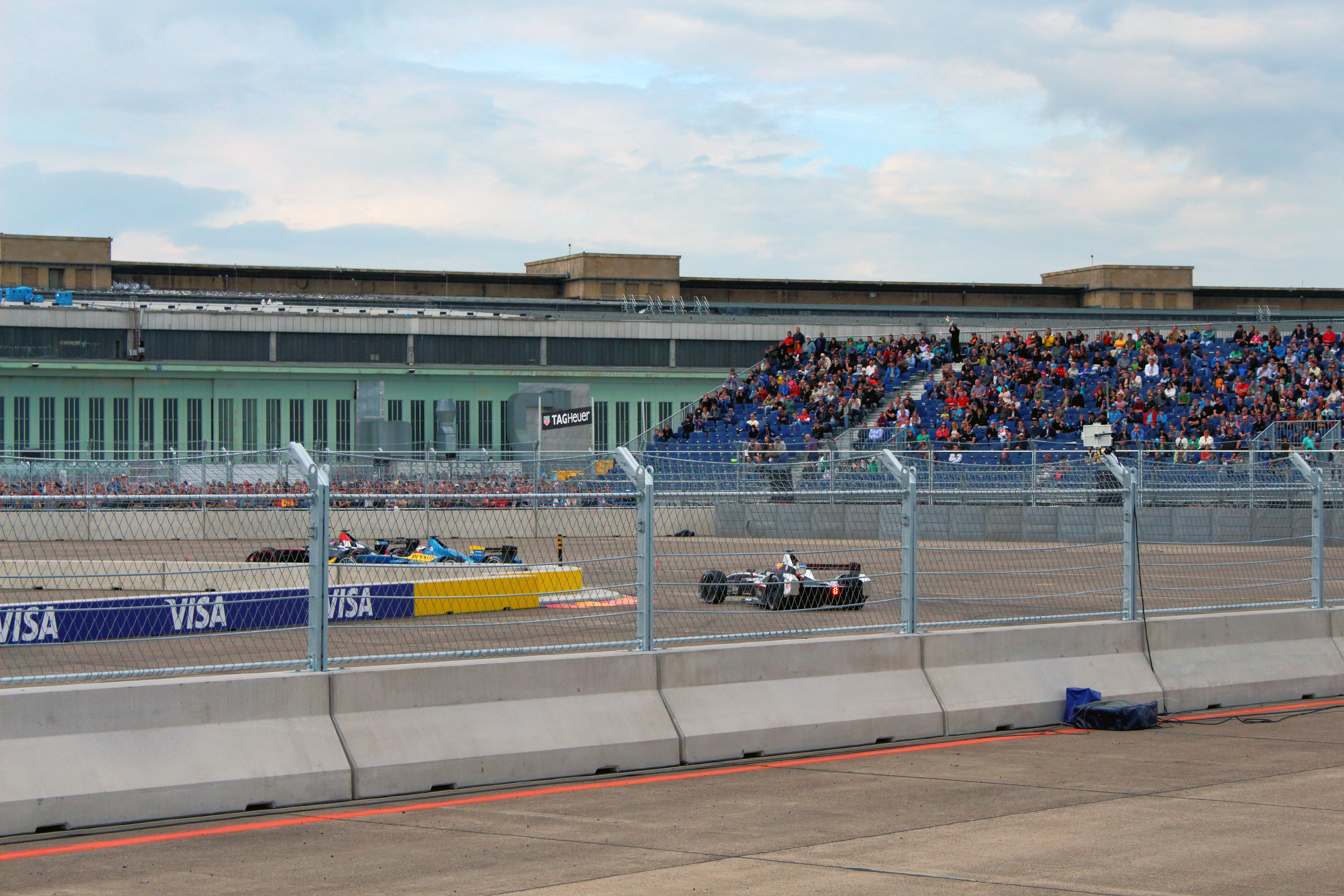
Cars pass through turn ten.

Two free practice sessions were held before qualifying, running for 45 and 30 minutes respectively. The first session started at 08:15 local time, with Sébastien Buemi topping the timesheets for e.dams-Renault in a time of 1:23.158. The track got faster as the temperatures rose and more cars drove around the circuit; lap times improved by more than a second in the second session, which started at 10:30. This time, it was championship leader Lucas di Grassi who topped the timesheets with a lap time of 1:22.032.

=== Qualifying ===
In contrast to other racing series such as Formula One, Formula E has a specific qualifying mode, in which the twenty drivers are divided up into four groups, leaving enough space on track for everyone to produce lap times without interference by other drivers. Each group had ten minutes on track and the fastest time of each driver determined the grid position. A lottery determined which drivers started in which group. With five-minute breaks between the groups, qualifying had an overall length of 55 minutes.

Racing veteran Jarno Trulli (Trulli GP) started in the first group, as qualifying began at 12:00, and posted a strong time of 1:21.547 early in the session, being the first to lap the course in under 1:22. Also in the group was Nelson Piquet Jr. – second in the championship – who ultimately managed only 13th place on the grid. As qualifying progressed, championship leader Lucas di Grassi and Monaco winner Sébastien Buemi came close to beating Trulli's time, but proved unable to do so, handing Trulli a surprising pole position, his first in Formula E.

=== Race ===
A special feature of Formula E was the "Fan Boost" feature, an additional 30 kilowatts (40 hp) of power to use for five seconds during the race. The three drivers, who were allowed to use the boost, were determined by a fan vote. For the Berlin race, Nelson Piquet Jr., Sébastien Buemi and Charles Pic (NEXTEV TCR) were handed the extra power. For Piquet, it was the third boost in a row, while both Buemi and Pic were able to use it for the first time.

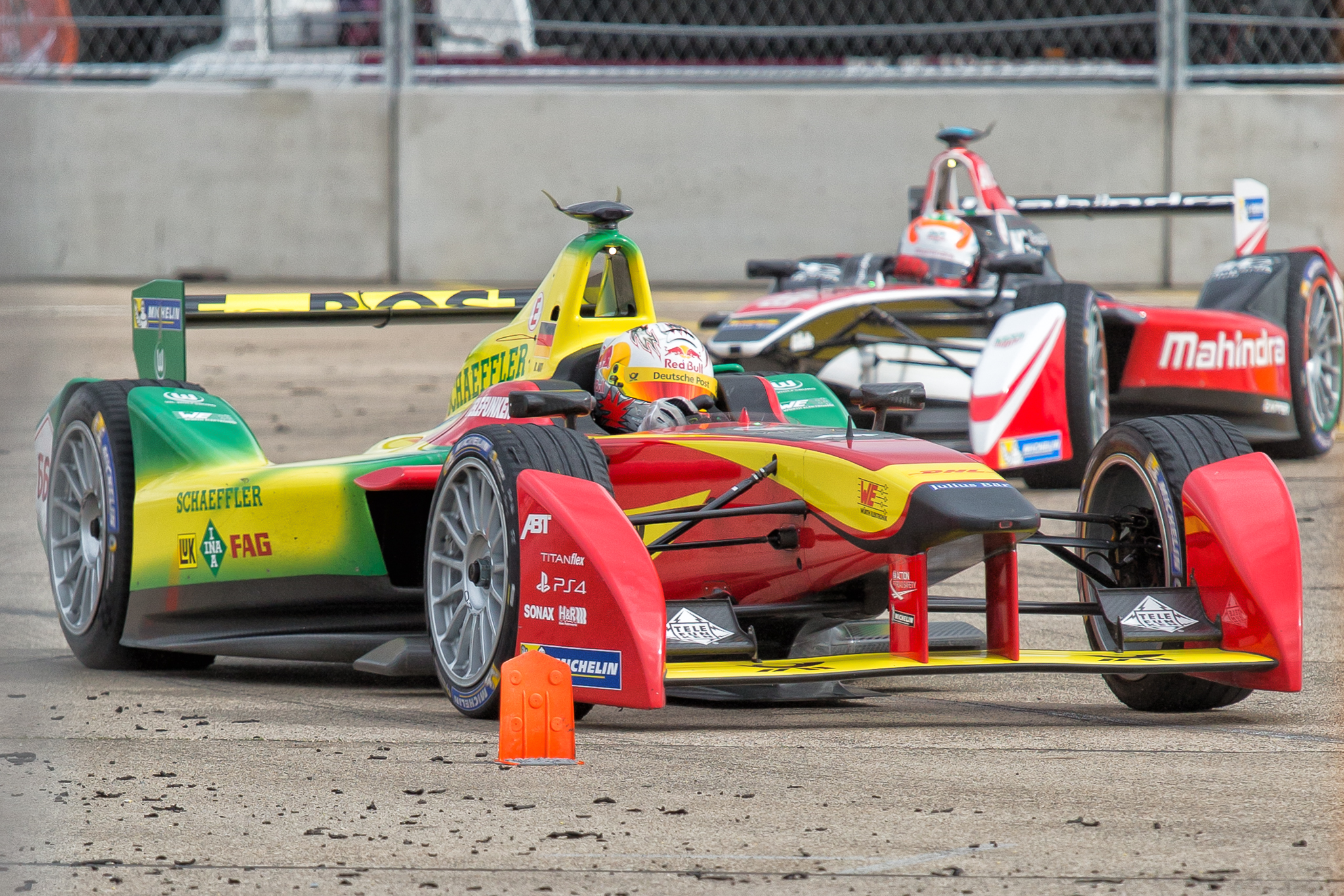
Local driver Daniel Abt spun early in the race, leaving him out of the points.

At the start of the race, Lucas di Grassi challenged Jarno Trulli for the lead, but Trulli closed the racing line into turn one. As Trulli lost the rear end of the car going into turn three, di Grassi took the lead. The other Audi Sport Abt of Daniel Abt was less fortunate, being sent into a spin at the same corner, dropping to the back of the field. Nelson Piquet Jr. immediately made up for ground lost in qualifying, gaining three positions during the first lap, running in tenth place. At turn six on the following lap, he went past Stéphane Sarrazin (Venturi) for ninth. While di Grassi built an early lead, several manoeuvres were made behind him, with Nicolas Prost (e.dams-Renault) losing two positions to Jérôme d'Ambrosio (Dragon Racing) and Vitantonio Liuzzi (Trulli GP), dropping back to seventh. Pole sitter Jarno Trulli looked to be in trouble with his car and lost positions continuously, running in thirteenth after lap twelve. Third placed Nick Heidfeld was also unable to hold onto his podium position, being overtaken by d'Ambrosio on lap thirteen.

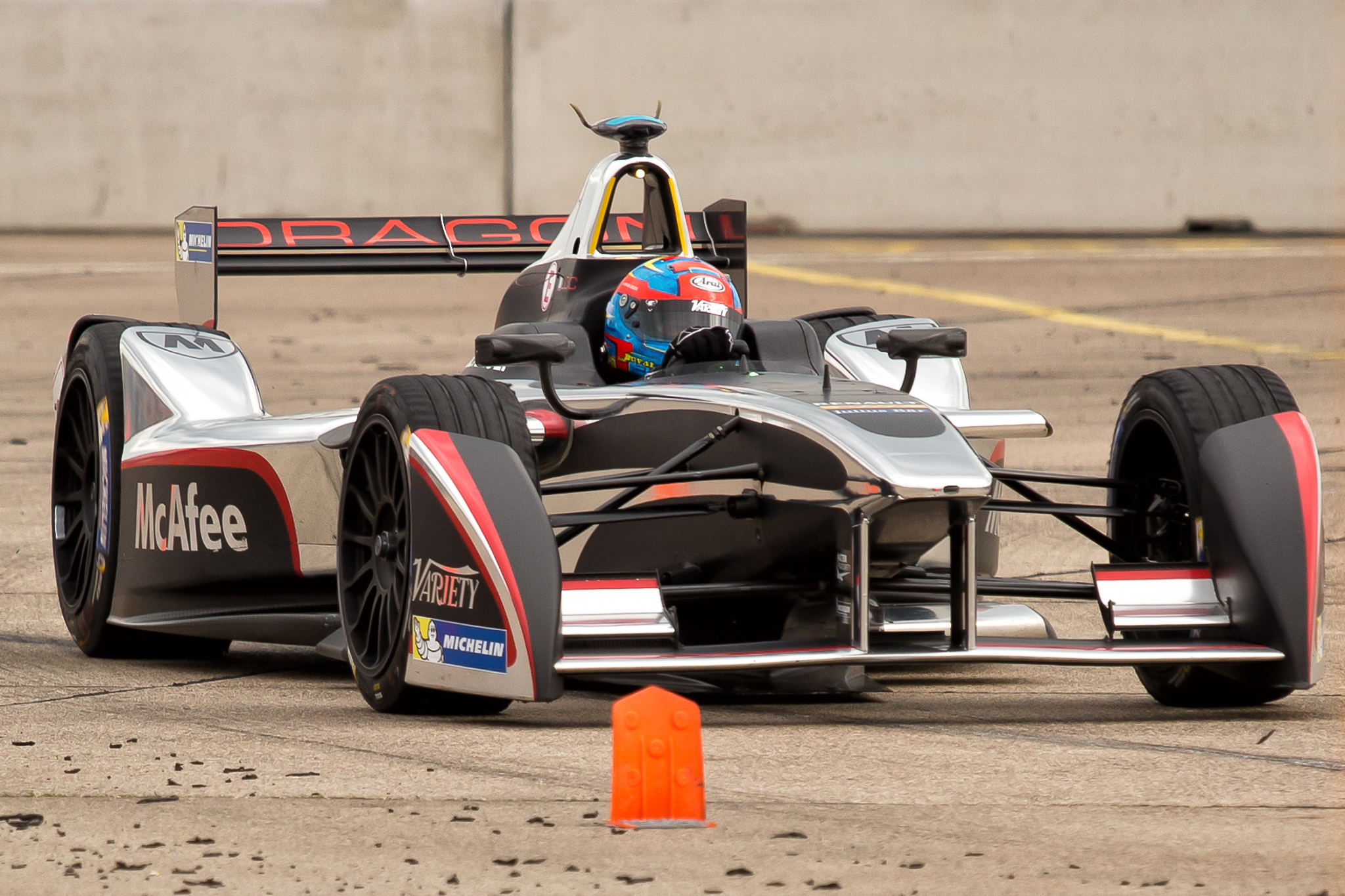
Loïc Duval finished third, his first podium finish in Formula E.

The mandatory pit stops, during which all drivers needed to change into a second car, started on lap 17. Everyone came in at this point except the two NEXTEV TCR drivers Piquet and Charles Pic. D'Ambrosio managed to get ahead of Buemi into second place thanks to swift work from his crew. Piquet benefited from his late stop by moving ahead into eighth after everyone had pitted and having more power left to use towards the end of the race. Heidfeld ran into additional trouble during the second half of the race, losing two positions during the final laps to both Loïc Duval (Dragon Racing) and the fast running Piquet, who managed to finish fifth from thirteenth on the grid, even closing on Duval on the final lap. Meanwhile, di Grassi won comfortably from d'Ambrosio, the gap being more than twelve seconds.

==== Post-race ====
After the chequered flag fell, Lucas di Grassi's car stopped on the way back to pit lane. Once his car returned to parc fermé, it failed post-race scrutineering, and was found to have a modified front wing, leading to his disqualification. This meant that Jérôme d'Ambrosio was handed his first Formula E victory, moving him into fifth place in the drivers' championship. Nelson Piquet Jr. recovered from his "dismal" qualifying performance to finish an eventual fourth, taking the championship lead. While e.dams Renault retained their lead in the teams' championship, the strong result for the Dragon Racing squad meant they moved up into second. The Abt team decided not to appeal the decision against Di Grassi, while emphasizing that the front wing did not lead to a performance advantage. Di Grassi himself responded on Twitter, writing: "They are trying to make me win this championship in the hard mode. Don't worry, we will be back to kick some Piquet and Buemi ass on track."

D'Ambrosio was delighted with the result, commenting: "It was a great weekend for us overall. I think in the last four races we've had the pace to be on the podium but we didn't always manage to put it all together in the race. [...] This time we did it and it paid off!" He however added regret about the fact that he and the team were unable to celebrate the win and a double podium at the respective ceremony.

== Classification ==
=== Qualifying ===
Pos.	No.	Driver	Constructor	Time	Gap	Grid
1	10	(Italy) Jarno Trulli	Trulli	1:21.547		1
2	11	(Brazil) Lucas di Grassi	Audi Sport ABT	1:21.623	+0.076	2
3	9	(Switzerland) Sébastien Buemi	e.dams-Renault	1:21.685	+0.138	3
4	23	(Germany) Nick Heidfeld	Venturi	1:21.710	+0.163	4
5	66	(Germany) Daniel Abt	Audi Sport ABT	1:21.754	+0.207	5
6	7	(Belgium) Jérôme d'Ambrosio	Dragon Racing	1:21.861	+0.314	6
7	8	(France) Nicolas Prost	e.dams-Renault	1:21.911	+0.364	7
8	6	(France) Loïc Duval	Dragon Racing	1:21.917	+0.370	8
9	30	(France) Stéphane Sarrazin	Venturi	1:21.978	+0.431	9
10	27	(France) Jean-Éric Vergne	Andretti	1:22.015	+0.468	10
11	18	(Italy) Vitantonio Liuzzi	Trulli	1:22.032	+0.485	11
12	28	(United States) Scott Speed	Andretti	1:22.096	+0.549	12
13	99	(Brazil) Nelson Piquet Jr.	NEXTEV TCR	1:22.310	+0.763	13
14	3	(Spain) Jaime Alguersuari	Virgin Racing	1:22.395	+0.848	14
15	2	(United Kingdom) Sam Bird	Virgin Racing	1:22.437	+0.890	15
16	77	(Mexico) Salvador Durán	Amlin Aguri	1:22.444	+0.897	16
17	88	(France) Charles Pic	NEXTEV TCR	1:22.464	+0.917	17
18	21	(Brazil) Bruno Senna	Mahindra Racing	1:22.575	+1.028	18
19	55	(Portugal) António Félix da Costa	Amlin Aguri	1:22.586	+1.039	19
20	5	(India) Karun Chandhok	Mahindra Racing	1:22.803	+1.256	20

=== Race ===
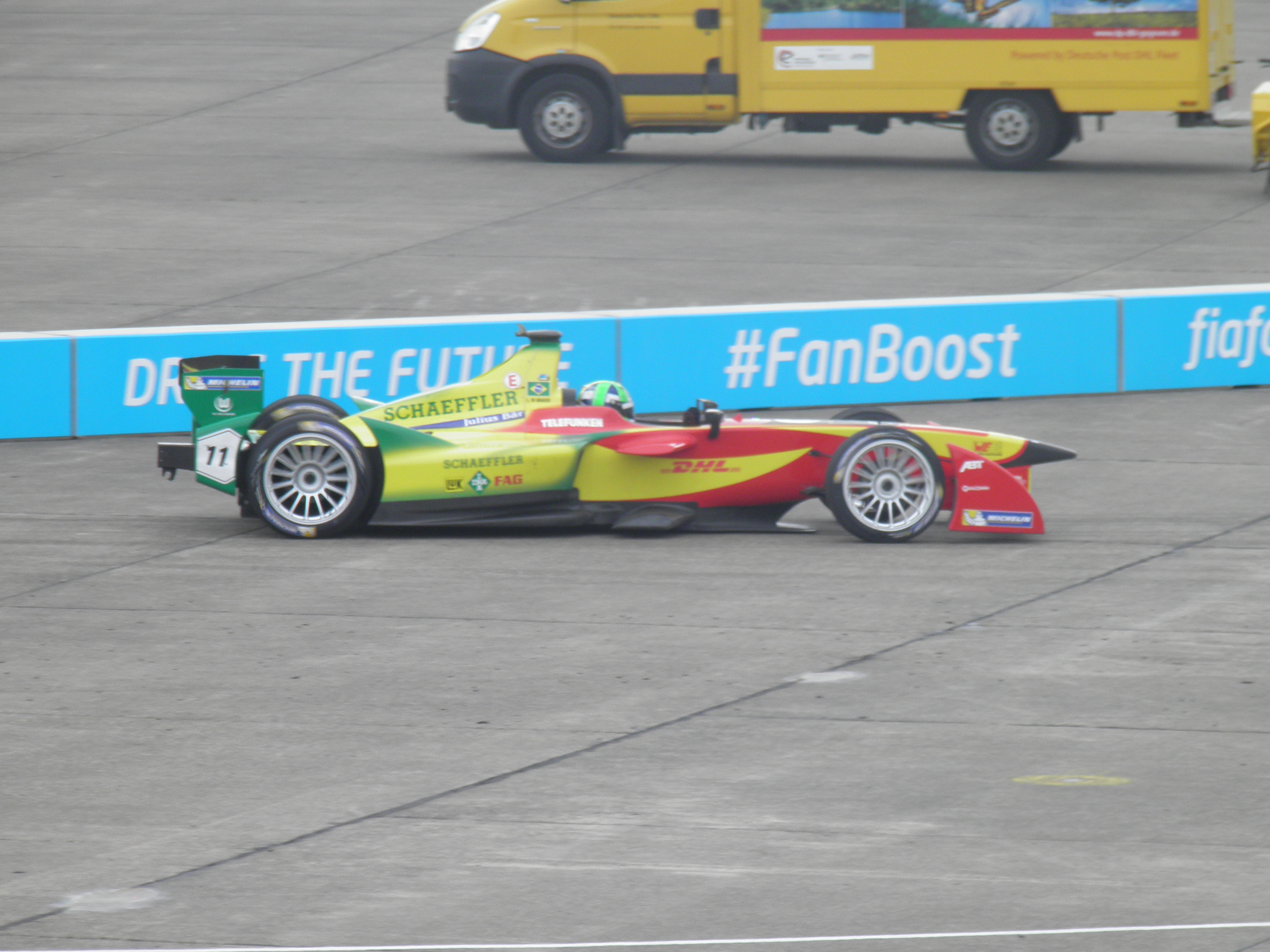
Lucas di Grassi was disqualified for using non-standardised components.

Pos.	No.	Driver	Team	Laps	Time/Retired	Grid	Points
1	7	(Belgium) Jérôme d'Ambrosio	Dragon Racing	33	48:26.566	6	25
2	9	(Switzerland) Sébastien Buemi	e.dams-Renault	33	+2.433	3	18
3	6	(France) Loïc Duval	Dragon Racing	33	+3.508	8	15
4	99	(Brazil) Nelson Piquet Jr.	NEXTEV TCR	33	+3.975	13	12+2^{1}
5	23	(Germany) Nick Heidfeld	Venturi	33	+13.046	4	10
6	30	(France) Stéphane Sarrazin	Venturi	33	+13.335	9	8
7	27	(France) Jean-Éric Vergne	Andretti	33	+13.678	10	6
8	2	(United Kingdom) Sam Bird	Virgin Racing	33	+14.055	15	4
9	18	(Italy) Vitantonio Liuzzi	Trulli	33	+15.636	11	2
10	8	(France) Nicolas Prost	e.dams-Renault	33	+16.602	7	1
11	55	(Portugal) António Félix da Costa	Amlin Aguri	33	+16.797	19	
12	3	(Spain) Jaime Alguersuari	Virgin Racing	33	+20.594	14	
13	28	(United States) Scott Speed	Andretti	33	+21.149	12	
14	66	(Germany) Daniel Abt	Audi Sport ABT	33	+23.688	5	
15	88	(France) Charles Pic	NEXTEV TCR	33	+25.491	17	
16	77	(Mexico) Salvador Durán	Amlin Aguri	33	+44.157	16	
17	21	(Brazil) Bruno Senna	Mahindra Racing	33	+46.257	18	
18	5	(India) Karun Chandhok	Mahindra Racing	33	+52.703^{2}	20	
19	10	(Italy) Jarno Trulli	Trulli	31	+2 laps	1	3^{3}
DSQ	11	(Brazil) Lucas di Grassi	Audi Sport ABT	33	Disqualified^{4}	2	

Notes

- ^1 – Two points for fastest lap.
- ^2 – Karun Chandhok received a drive through penalty converted into a 28 second time penalty for exceeding maximum power usage.
- ^3 – Three points for pole position.
- ^4 – Excluded from race for non-standardised components.

== Standings after the race ==
Drivers or teams listed in bold were still able to take their respective titles.

Drivers' Championship standings

Pos	Driver	Points
1	(Brazil) **Nelson Piquet Jr.**	103
2	(Switzerland) **Sébastien Buemi**	101
3	(Brazil) **Lucas di Grassi**	93
4	(France) **Nicolas Prost**	78
5	(Belgium) **Jérôme d'Ambrosio**	77

Teams' Championship standings

Pos	Constructor	Points
1	(France) **e.dams Renault**	179
2	(United States) **Dragon Racing**	116
3	(Germany) **Audi Sport ABT**	115
4	**China Racing**	107
5	(United Kingdom) **Virgin Racing**	98

- Note: Only the top five positions are included for both sets of standings.

== See also ==
- Sport in Berlin

Previous race: 2015 Monaco ePrix	FIA Formula E Championship; 2014–15 season	Next race: 2015 Moscow ePrix
Previous race: N/A	Berlin ePrix	Next race: 2016 Berlin ePrix
