= 2016 Berlin ePrix =

Formula E race in 2016

Race 8 of 10 of the 2015–16 Formula E Championship
← Previous race	Next race →
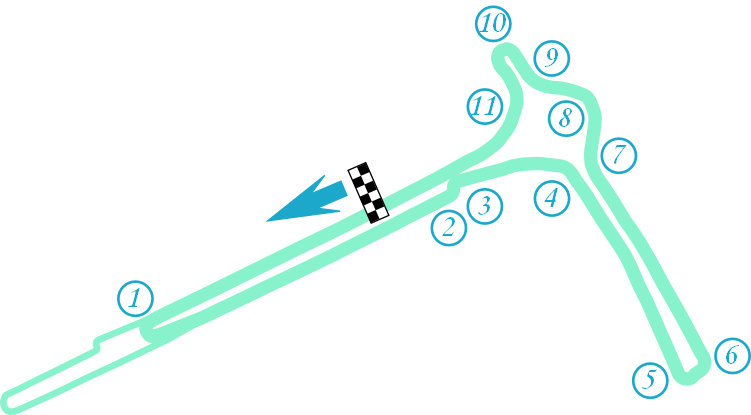

Race details
- Date: 21 May 2016
- Official name: 2016 FIA Formula E BMW i Berlin ePrix
- Location: Berlin Street Circuit, Berlin, Germany
- Course: Street circuit
- Course length: 1.927 km (1.20 miles)
- Distance: 48 laps, 92.530 km (57.476 miles)
- Weather: Sunny, Air: 23.5–24.05 °C (74.30–75.29 °F), Track: 24 °C (75 °F).
- Attendance: 15,000

Pole position
Driver	(France) Jean-Éric Vergne	Virgin Racing
- Time: 57.811

Fastest lap
Driver	(Brazil) Bruno Senna	Mahindra Racing
- Time: 59.067 on lap 39

Podium
First	(Switzerland) Sébastien Buemi	e.dams-Renault
Second	(Germany) Daniel Abt	Audi Sport ABT
Third	(Brazil) Lucas di Grassi	Audi Sport ABT

The 2016 Berlin ePrix (formally the 2016 FIA Formula E BMW i Berlin ePrix) was a Formula E electric car race held on 21 May 2016 before a crowd of 15,000 people at the Berlin Street Circuit in Berlin, Germany. It was the eighth round of the 2015–16 Formula E Championship and the second Berlin ePrix. The 48-lap race was won by e.dams-Renault driver Sébastien Buemi who began from second position. Audi Sport ABT teammates Daniel Abt and Lucas di Grassi finished in second and third.

Jean-Éric Vergne won the pole position by posting the fastest lap in qualifying but lost the lead to Buemi heading towards the first corner on the first lap. Vergne retook the lead from Buemi at the start of lap two until Buemi moved back into the position four laps later. Buemi held the lead through the mandatory pit stops, in which drivers switched into a second car, to win his and e.Dams-Renault's third race of the season. Further back, Abt passed Vergne and finished second despite ignoring team orders issued to him in the final two laps to allow di Grassi past as he became aware of the closing Nico Prost becoming a threat.

The result meant Buemi reduced di Grassi's advantage at the top of the Drivers' Championship to one point and Sam Bird was still in third place despite finishing outside of the points-scoring positions. Jérôme d'Ambrosio maintained fourth place but was now two points ahead of Prost. e.Dams-Renault increased their lead over Audi Sport ABT in the Teams' Championship to eleven points and Virgin overtook Dragon for fourth position with two races left in the season.

== Background ==
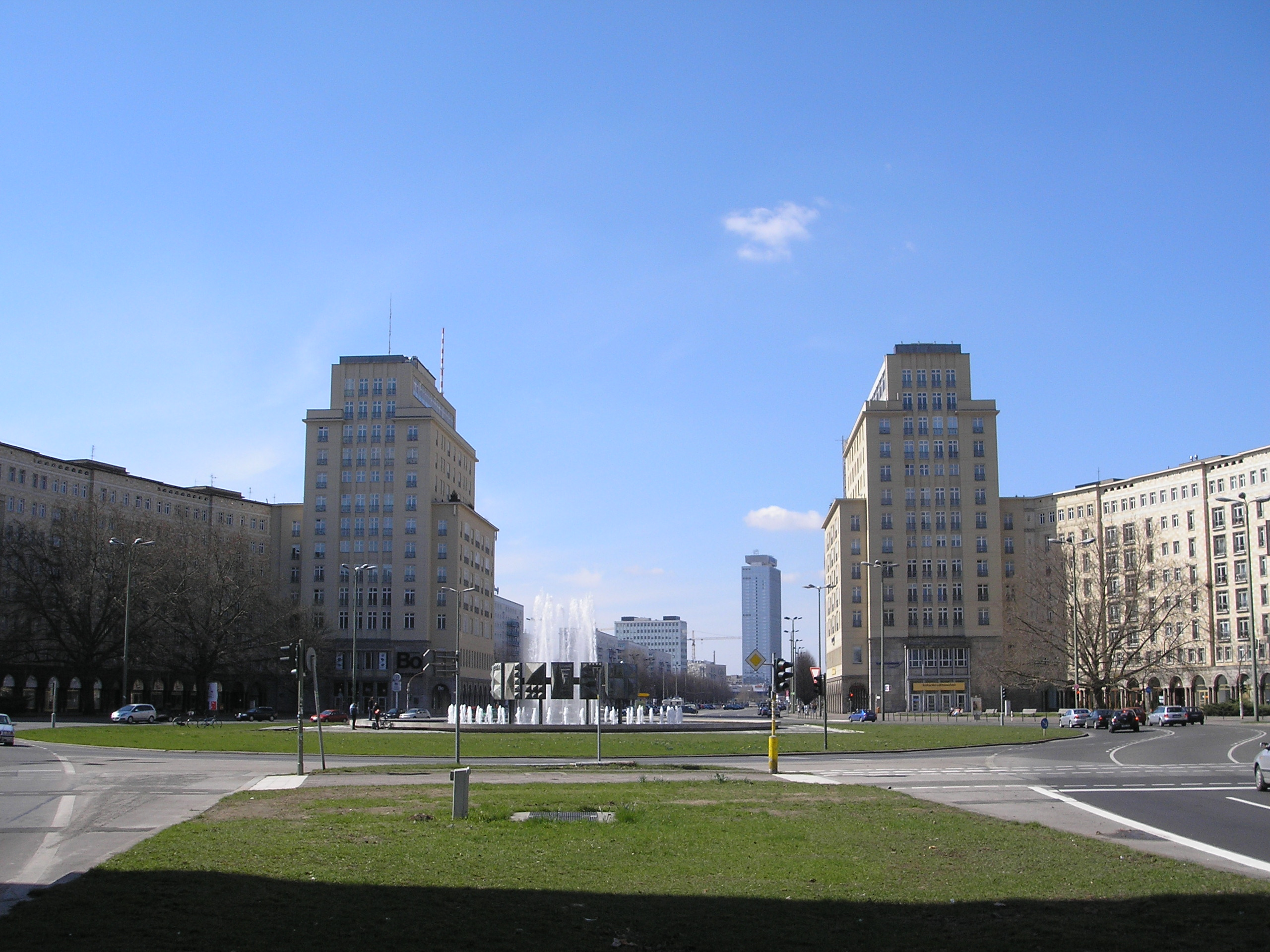
Strausberger Platz, where part of the race was held.

The Berlin ePrix was confirmed as part of Formula E's 2015–16 schedule in October 2015 by the FIA World Motor Sport Council. It was the eighth of ten single seater electric car races of the 2015–16 season, the second Berlin ePrix, and was held on 21 May 2016 at the Berlin Street Circuit in Berlin, Germany. The eleven-turn track is 2.030 km (1.261 mi) long, with the pit lane on Karl-Marx-Allee and the course went around Strausberger Platz and Alexanderplatz.

Before the race, Audi Sport ABT driver Lucas di Grassi led the Drivers' Championship with 126 points, eleven ahead of Sébastien Buemi in second, who in turn, was a further 33 points in front of third-placed Sam Bird. Jérôme d'Ambrosio was fourth on 64 points and Stéphane Sarrazin was fifth with 58 points. e.dams-Renault Led the Teams' Championship with 165 points, seven in front of Audi Sport ABT in second. Dragon and Virgin (on 112 and 106 points) were third and fourth and Mahindra were fifth with 65 points.

In November 2015, it was reported the Berlin Tempelhof Airport was "highly unlikely" to hold the race because the facility was being used to shelter refugees. After the series received official confirmation they were not allowed to use Tempelhof's facilities, Formula E's chief operating officer Alejandro Agag sought to hold the event at the Norisring street circuit in Nuremberg with alternatives for Munich and Berlin. Negotiations with Norisring's management ended when a decision had not been made by the 15 January deadline. It was announced one month later the race would be held in downtown Berlin pending approval from city authorities and motorsport's governing body, the Fédération Internationale de l'Automobile. The race came under disapproval from the mayors of the Friedrichshain and Berlin-Mitte districts Monika Herrmann and Christian Hanke who both stated they did not want to the race in the city centre. Although motor racing is forbidden on Germany's public roads, the Senate of Berlin granted dispensation for Formula E to hold the race on Berlin's streets in March. Construction of the track started on 9 May, 12 days before the race.

After finishing in third in the preceding Paris ePrix, Buemi was confident about his chances for the Berlin race, saying the plan was to qualify in a higher starting position and attempt to race at the front of the field: "We know we can do it as in Paris the car was super-quick; we just started too far behind to be able to do any better." Daniel Abt said that while he was not interested in the drivers' standings, he wanted to finish the ePrix on the podium. He wished to celebrate the achievement with the German spectators, and it was the best method in helping his teammate di Grassi in the championship battle. After winning the season's previous two races, di Grassi stated that his team's objective was to win the title and aimed to continue their recent momentum into Berlin: "Our car is a winner, our team keeps cool and stays focused when the pressure is on – in this way we can win the home race.”

For the ePrix, nine teams each entered two drivers for a total of 18 participants. There was one driver change before the race. Having been in one of the Aguri cars since the first round of the season in Beijing, António Félix da Costa missed the race because of a Deutsche Tourenwagen Masters commitment at the Red Bull Ring and was replaced by endurance driver René Rast. The deal was confirmed in the week before the race and was originally slated to be World Endurance Championship driver Adam Carroll but the agreement fell through. It marked Rast's first participation in single-seater machinery since the Formula BMW ADAC in 2004 and practised on the team's simulator to familiarise himself with the car. Oliver Turvey was set to be replaced by European Le Mans Series driver Ben Hanley because of a Super GT commitment at the Autopolis circuit, but that race was postponed because of the Kumamoto earthquakes, and his Formula E seat was reinstated.

== Practice ==
Two practice sessions—both on Saturday morning—were held before the day's late afternoon race. The first session ran for 45 minutes and the second for 30 minutes. Both sessions took place in dry weather conditions. Buemi used 200 kW (270 hp) of power to set the first practice session's fastest lap of 57.648 seconds just before it ended; Turvey was second-fastest and was fastest until Buemi's lap. Di Grassi, Nico Prost, Bird, Loïc Duval, Mike Conway, d'Ambrosio, Sarrazin and Abt occupied positions three to ten. During the session, where many drivers struggled with traffic, Robin Frijns swerved to avoid hitting Bruno Senna at the turn five and six hairpin. Di Grassi later pressed the neutral button on his car's steering wheel, causing him to briefly stop on track.

Although he was limited to one timed lap as he missed the majority of the second practice session due to a battery failure on his second car, Nelson Piquet Jr. recorded the fastest lap of 57.909 seconds, 0.013 seconds faster than Bird in second who was fastest until Piquet's lap. Jean-Éric Vergne, Frijns, Turvey, Duval, Senna, Abt, Conway and Nick Heidfeld were in positions three to ten. Buemi locked his tyres at turn five and struck the barrier, damaging his front wing. The cleanup was jeopardised when Simona de Silvestro narrowly avoided colliding with Buemi's car. Buemi was able to return to the pit lane for a new nose cone. Sarrazin pushed hard and went straight into the turn 11 barrier, damaging his car and temporarily stopping the session. Rast stopped in turn six, causing yellow flags to be waved.

== Qualifying ==
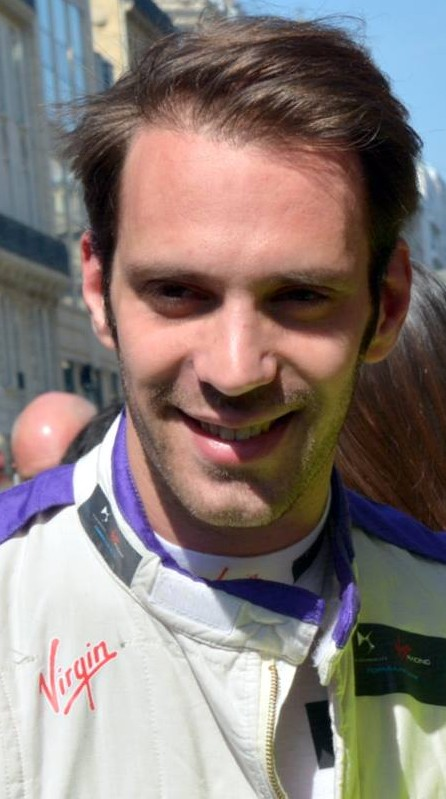
Jean-Éric Vergne had the fourth pole position of his Formula E career.

Saturday afternoon's 60-minute qualifying session was divided into four groups of five cars. Each group was determined by a lottery system and was permitted six minutes of on-track activity. All drivers were limited to two timed laps with one at maximum power. The fastest five overall competitors in the four groups participated in a "Super Pole" session with one driver on the track at any time going out in reverse order from fifth to first. Each of the five drivers was limited to one timed lap and the starting order was determined by the competitor's fastest times. The driver and team who recorded the fastest time were awarded three points towards their respective championships. Qualifying took place in dry and warm weather.

In the first group, despite making small errors shortly before he completed his lap, Turvey paced the session, seven-hundredths of a second faster than di Grassi in second who struck the kerbs at the first chicane. Frijns damaged his car's front-left tyre in a contact with a barrier and was third-quickest, ahead of Sarrazin who lost control of his vehicle at turn ten, causing the session to be stopped for a short period. Vergne was the fastest driver in the second group, nearly two-tenths of a second quicker than Abt. Bird was third-fastest, ahead of Prost who lost time after he went deep heading towards the final corner. Rast completed the second group's running. Heidfeld was the quickest driver in the third group, almost three-tenths of a second faster than Piquet who lost control of his car at the hairpin, losing him four-tenths of a second. D'Ambrosio struggled to locate reference points on the track because of a lack of running in practice and was third-quickest. Conway and de Silvestro were the two slowest drivers in the third group. Buemi set the fastest overall fastest time of any competitor in the group stages in the fourth group with a time of 57.322 seconds. He was 0.269 seconds faster than Senna in second. and Duval struggled with tyre grip to finish third. Ma Qinghua struggled and was the slowest overall driver. After group qualifying ended, Buemi, Senna, Vergne, Heidfeld and Abt had fast enough lap times to progress them to super pole.

Abt was the first driver to attempt a lap time in super pole and made an error at the final turn in a 57.852-second lap. Heidfeld went narrowly faster in the first third of the lap but damaged his front-left suspension in a collision with the turn eight barrier, leaving him fifth. Vergne went quickest in the track's second sector, and despite narrowly colliding with Senna (who was leaving the pit lane) took provisional pole position with a lap of 57.811 seconds. Senna left the pit lane with oversteer and was one-tenth of a second slower in the first sector, and went half a second down in the following sector and ran wide in the final corner, and took fourth. Buemi, the pole position favourite, was slower than Vergne in the first third of the lap, and had similar results elsewhere to qualify second. This meant Vergne took his first pole position of the season, the fourth of his career, and his team's third consecutive of the year. After qualifying, Mahindra drivers Senna and Heidfeld were demoted to 15th and 16th on the grid because of irregular tyre pressures, while Sarrazin and d'Ambrosio were similarly penalised and started from the back of the field. The rest of the grid lined up after penalties as Bird, Piquet, Prost, Turvey, di Grassi, Duval, de Silvestro, Conway, Frijns, Rast, Ma, Senna, Heidfeld, Sarrazin and d'Ambrosio.

=== Qualifying classification ===
Final qualifying classification
Pos.	No.	Driver	Team	GS	SP	Grid
1	25	(France) Jean-Éric Vergne	Virgin	57.603	57.811	1
2	9	(Switzerland) Sébastien Buemi	e.Dams-Renault	57.322	57.827	2
3	66	(Germany) Daniel Abt	Audi Sport ABT	57.798	57.852	3
4	2	(United Kingdom) Sam Bird	Virgin	57.838	—N/a	4
5	1	(Brazil) Nelson Piquet Jr.	NextEV TCR	58.026	—N/a	5
6	8	(France) Nico Prost	e.Dams-Renault	58.028	—N/a	6
7	88	(United Kingdom) Oliver Turvey	NextEV TCR	58.118	—N/a	7
8	11	(Brazil) Lucas di Grassi	Audi Sport ABT	58.183	—N/a	8
9	6	(France) Loïc Duval	Dragon	58.298	—N/a	9
10	28	(Switzerland) Simona de Silvestro	Andretti	58.654	—N/a	10
11	12	(United Kingdom) Mike Conway	Venturi	58.687	—N/a	11
12	27	(Netherlands) Robin Frijns	Andretti	58.742	—N/a	12
13	55	(Germany) René Rast	Aguri	58.756	—N/a	13
14	77	(China) Ma Qinghua	Aguri	59.301	—N/a	14
15	21	(Brazil) Bruno Senna	Mahindra	一	一	15^{1}
16	23	(Germany) Nick Heidfeld	Mahindra	一	一	16^{1}
17	4	(France) Stéphane Sarrazin	Venturi	一	—N/a	PL^{2}
18	7	(Belgium) Jérôme d'Ambrosio	Dragon	一	—N/a	18^{2}

Notes:

- ^1 – Bruno Senna and Nick Heidfeld were Excluded from Qualifying for irregular tyre pressures.
- ^2 – Stéphane Sarrazin and Jérôme d'Ambrosio were Excluded from Qualifying due to irregular tyre pressures.

== Race ==
A special feature of Formula E is the "Fan Boost" feature, an additional 100 kW (130 hp) of power to use in the driver's second car. The three drivers allowed to use the boost were determined by a fan vote. For the Berlin race, Buemi, Sarrazin and Heidfeld were handed the extra power. The weather at the start was dry and sunny with the air temperature between 23.5–24.05 °C (74.30–75.29 °F) and a track temperature of 24 °C (75 °F). 15,000 people attended the race. The race started at 16:00 Central European Summer Time (UTC+2). The chassis damage to Sarrazin's car meant his team initially announced he would not race, but repairs to it were completed in time, allowing him to drive. On the grid, Buemi accelerated faster than the distracted Vergne and passed him for the lead into the first turn, using its braking zone to keep the position. Di Grassi overtook NextEV drivers Piquet and Turvey to move into sixth. Piquet lost grip in the first turn; he began to slide but regained control of his car and continued. An error by Senna saw him collide with the rear of Rast's car, causing bodywork damage to both cars.

At the end of the first lap, Vergne out-braked Buemi into the first corner and positioned himself on the inside to reclaim the lead in a near carbon-copy manoeuvre to which he had been subjected to by Buemi the previous lap. As the top six concertinaed together, the damage to the cars of Rast, Piquet and Turvey prompted officials to show the trio a black flag with an orange circle, mandating their entry to the pit lane for repairs. Initially Vergne began to open up a small advantage over Buemi, as the latter had elected to hold off in making a move on Vergne until lap six. Buemi retook the lead from Vergne by passing him on the inside into turn five and the two narrowly avoided contact. Vergne's exit out of the corner was compromised and he had to hold off Abt. At the front, Buemi pulled away from the rest of the field. On the 10th lap, Abt executed a similar manoeuvre to Buemi on the first lap and passed Vergne for second at the turn one hairpin. Bird had been pressuring Abt for third earlier in the race but was ordered to enter the pit lane as he took a kerb too fast, loosening his front wing end-plate. Bird emerged in 14th, and protested the penalty by radio.

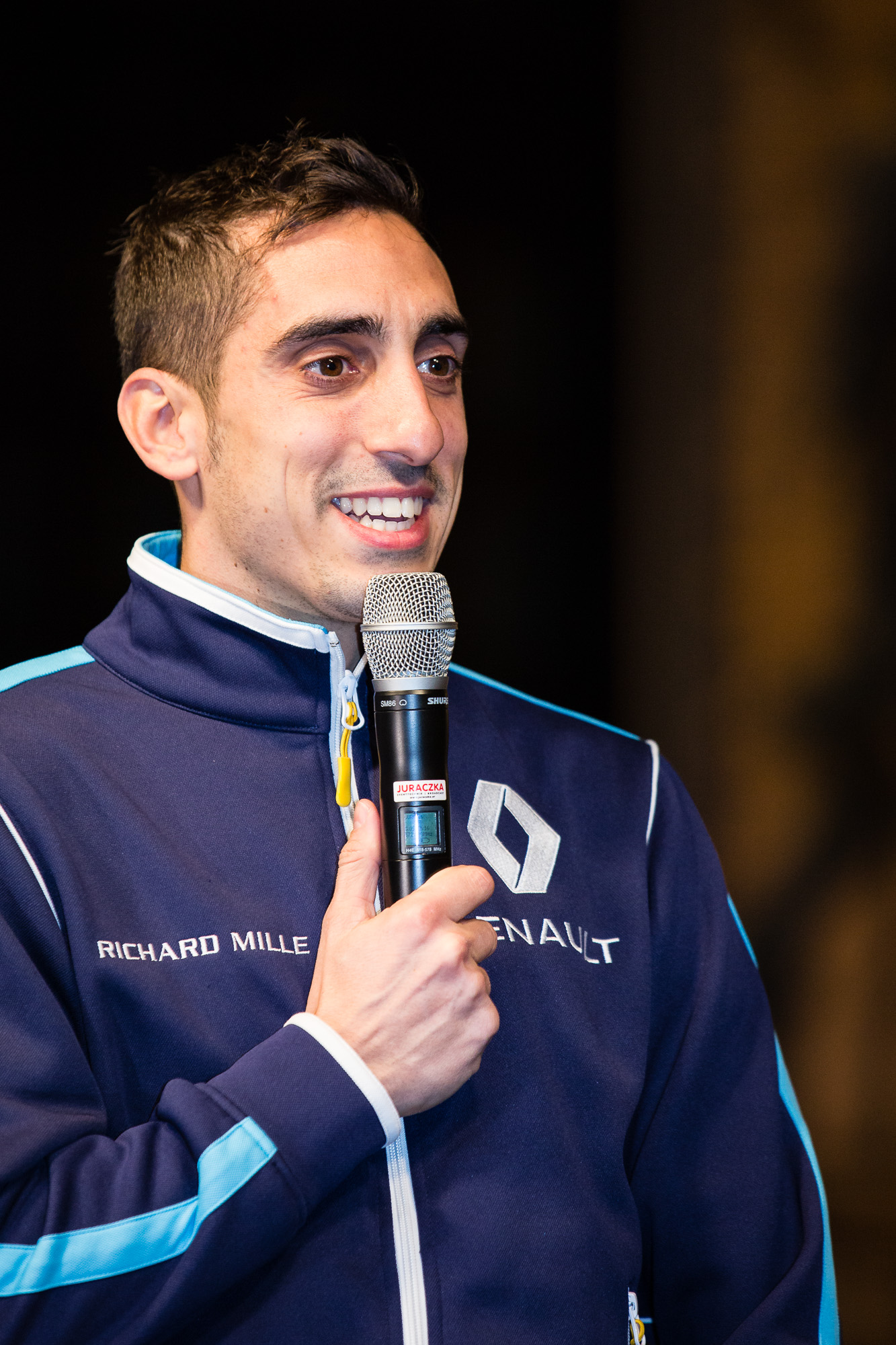
Sébastien Buemi led the majority of the ePrix and took his third victory of the season.

While Buemi increased his lead over Abt to five seconds, di Grassi was in a tight bunch of cars consisting of Vergne in fourth and Prost in fifth. Di Grassi's team told him that they would attempt to keep him on the track for one lap longer than his rivals. Further down the field, Frijns fought his way through into the top ten and slid and drifted through the first turn in a pass on Duval. Heidfeld had also moved through the field to run in the top ten and later mounted the kerb to overtake Conway for ninth place. Prost then drew closer to Vergne and the pressure put onto Vergne caused the latter to hit the bollards at the chicane. This shattered the front right section on Vergne's front wing. Vergne then took too much kerb again into the same chicane on lap 24, removing his front wing. Debris was littered on the track and Prost passed Vergne for third position. The leaders began making their mandatory pit stops to change into a second car on lap 24. Di Grassi's strategy allowed him to remain on the track for one extra lap, and made his pit stop on the 25th lap. After the pit stops, Buemi kept the lead with Abt second, Prost third and di Grassi passed Vergne for fourth.

With the debris from Vergne's car littered across the track at the chicane, officials called for the full course yellow flag on lap 28 to allow marshals to clean the track. Racing resumed one lap later with Buemi leading Abt by 11 seconds. Bird moved into 12th by passing d'Ambrosio during lap 32. Attention focused on the battle for third place as di Grassi was closing up to Prost. Di Grassi had more electrical energy than Prost and his first move on the latter saw him steer onto the outside on the 38th lap. Di Grassi then drew alongside Prost but noted the lack of room available and could not overtake him. As he completed the following lap, Di Grassi passed Prost on the inside for third place at turn one. Senna recorded the race's fastest lap of 59.067 seconds on the 39th lap to earn two points. Soon after, it was announced di Grassi was under investigation for speeding during the full course yellow procedure as he drew closer to teammate Abt.

Duval lost control of his car on the 42nd lap and slid backwards into the turn seven outside barrier. The incident necessitated the deployment of the safety car and the time gaps in the field were neutralised. Although Duval's vehicle was stuck in a place where it was difficult to retrieve, course marshals were able to move it quickly and allowing the race to restart with two laps left. Buemi kept the lead with Abt close behind. Abt was informed by his team di Grassi was faster than him and was ordered to let him pass. Abt attempted to let di Grassi past but the latter could not do so since Prost was drawing closer and Abt realised that switching positions with di Grassi carried the risk of losing a podium position. Buemi maintained the lead for the rest of the race to take his third victory of the season. Abt took his best Formula E finish at the time in second and teammate di Grassi was third. Off the podium, Prost secured fourth. Vergne, Frijns, Heidfeld, Conway, de Silvestro and Sarrazin completed the top ten. The British duo of Bird and Turvey took 11th and 12th, ahead of Piquet, Ma, Senna and d'Ambrosio were the final finishers.

=== Post-race ===
The top three drivers appeared on the podium to collect their trophies and spoke to the media in a later press conference. Buemi said he allowed Vergne to pass and attacked when the latter had used more electrical energy. He wanted for the fastest lap in his second car, and despite not achieving the goal, he described the race as "a good weekend" overall. Second-place finisher Abt stated the race was "simply amazing" and thanked his team for providing him with a fast car. He said from the start, he was aware he could perform well and the opposition he faced was strong. Di Grassi was happy to finish third despite the difficulties he faced with Vergne on his in-lap and the deployment of the safety car, adding "But we managed to pass Prost, who made it difficult to overtake but we managed to do another podium and stay in the lead by one point. It couldn't be closer than that going into London. Now everything is open. London, and London weather, will decide how the championship goes."

After the race, di Grassi revealed to the press he was not favourable towards team orders favouring one driver over the other with expectations for the season's final race in the event one driver challenged for the championship. He remarked that he would rather lose the title by losing points to his rivals than another driver handing them to him. Abt said for him it did not matter if he finished second or third but affirmed his team's objective was to win both championships: "Lucas has what he needs to win it by himself. He's an amazing racing driver." Hans-Jürgen Abt, the team owner of Audi Sport ABT, accepted his son's failure of not complying with a team order and agreed driver integrity was an important area that needed protecting, "If we lose it by three points maybe the team is not good enough. But we showed people fair motorsport and I think people will like it more." Turvey and Bird were perplexed by the number of penalties issued to drivers, with Turvey saying, "I don't know why you get a technical flag for visual damage to the car. It's frustrating. Nelson had the same issue. There were a number of cars that got technical flags, which is a shame. I don't understand why we got a penalty." Buemi joined him in his criticism, claiming the safety car was sent out when there was no danger present.

The result reduced di Grassi's advantage atop the Drivers' Championship to one point over Buemi. Bird maintained third place despite not scoring any points and d'Ambrosio kept fourth place. Prost's fourth-place result overtook Sarrazin for fifth. e.Dams-Renault extended their lead in the Teams' Championship to 11 points over Audi Sport ABT. Virgin gained one position to move into third while Dragon fell to fourth place. Mahindra were fifth with two races left in the season.

=== Race classification ===
Drivers who scored championship points are denoted in bold.

Final race classification
Pos.	No.	Driver	Team	Laps	Time/Retired	Grid	Points
1	**9**	**(Switzerland) Sébastien Buemi**	**e.dams-Renault**	**48**	**53:46.086**	**2**	25
2	**66**	**(Germany) Daniel Abt**	**Audi Sport ABT**	**48**	**+1.767**	**3**	18
3	**11**	**(Brazil) Lucas di Grassi**	**Audi Sport ABT**	**48**	**+2.381**	**8**	15
4	**8**	**(France) Nico Prost**	**e.dams-Renault**	**48**	**+3.328**	**6**	12
5	**25**	**(France) Jean-Éric Vergne**	**Virgin**	**48**	**+4.927**	**1**	10+3^{1}
6	**27**	**(Netherlands) Robin Frijns**	**Andretti**	**48**	**+6.501**	**12**	8
7	**23**	**(Germany) Nick Heidfeld**	**Mahindra**	**48**	**+7.700**	**16**	6
8	**12**	**(United Kingdom) Mike Conway**	**Venturi**	**48**	**+8.305**	**11**	4
9	**28**	**(Switzerland) Simona de Silvestro**	**Andretti**	**48**	**+12.473**	**10**	2
10	**4**	**(France) Stéphane Sarrazin**	**Venturi**	**48**	**+13.241**	**PL**	1
11	2	(United Kingdom) Sam Bird	Virgin	47	+1 Lap	4	
12	88	(United Kingdom) Oliver Turvey	NextEV TCR	47	+1 Lap	7	
13	1	(Brazil) Nelson Piquet Jr.	NextEV TCR	47	+1 Lap	5	
14	77	(China) Ma Qinghua	Aguri	47	+1 Lap	14	
15	**21**	**(Brazil) Bruno Senna**	**Mahindra**	**46**	**+2 Laps**	**15**	2^{2}
16	7	(Belgium) Jérôme d'Ambrosio	Dragon	45	+3 Laps	17	
NC	55	(Germany) René Rast	Aguri	42	+6 Laps	13	
Ret	6	(France) Loïc Duval	Dragon	39	Accident	9	

Notes:

- **^1** – Three points for pole position.
- **^2** – Two points for fastest lap.

== Standings after the race ==
Drivers' Championship standings

+/–	Pos	Driver	Points
	1	(Brazil) Lucas di Grassi	141
	2	(Switzerland) Sébastien Buemi	140
	3	(United Kingdom) Sam Bird	82
	4	(Belgium) Jérôme d'Ambrosio	64
	5	(France) Nicolas Prost	62

Teams' Championship standings

+/–	Pos	Constructor	Points
	1	(France) e.Dams-Renault	202
	2	(Germany) Audi Sport ABT	191
	3	(United Kingdom) Virgin	119
	4	(United States) Dragon	112
	5	(India) Mahindra	73

- Notes: Only the top five positions are included for both sets of standings.

Previous race: 2016 Paris ePrix	FIA Formula E Championship; 2015–16 season	Next race: 2016 London ePrix
Previous race: 2015 Berlin ePrix	Berlin ePrix	Next race: 2017 Berlin ePrix
