= 2016 Mexico City ePrix =

Race 5 of 10 of the 2015–16 Formula E season
← Previous race	Next race →
- Formula E layout of the Autódromo Hermanos Rodríguez

Race details
- Date: 12 March 2016
- Official name: 2016 FIA Formula E Mexico City ePrix
- Location: Autódromo Hermanos Rodríguez, Mexico City, Mexico
- Course: Permanent racing facility
- Course length: 2.09 km (1.299 miles)
- Distance: 43 laps, 89.96 km (55.90 miles)

Pole position
Driver	(Belgium) Jérôme d'Ambrosio	Dragon Racing
- Time: 1:03.705

Fastest lap
Driver	(France) Nicolas Prost	Renault-e.dams
- Time: 1:04.569

Podium
First	(Belgium) Jérôme d'Ambrosio	Dragon Racing
Second	(Switzerland) Sébastien Buemi	Renault-e.dams
Third	(France) Nicolas Prost	Renault-e.dams

The 2016 Mexico City ePrix was a Formula E motor race held on 12 March 2016 at the Autódromo Hermanos Rodríguez in Mexico City, Mexico. It was the fifth championship race of the 2015–16 Formula E season, the single-seater, electrically powered racing car series' second season. It also was the 16th Formula E race overall. The race was initially won by Lucas di Grassi, but later the win was handed to Jérôme d'Ambrosio because di Grassi's car was found to be underweight. This was d'Ambrosio's second Formula E win, after the 2015 Berlin ePrix, where he had also benefited from a disqualification of di Grassi.

== Circuit ==
The race took place on a modified version of the Autódromo Hermanos Rodríguez circuit. It was the first Formula E race on a permanent road course. The version used for the ePrix leads through the stadium section and also part of the oval. It is 2.092 kilometers in length and features 18 turns. Track design modification was done by Agustin Delicado Zomeño.

== Report ==
=== Background ===
The same 18 drivers as in the previous ePrix participated in this race.

== Classifications ==
=== Qualifying ===
Pos.	No.	Driver	Team	Time	Gap	Grid
1	9	(Switzerland) Sébastien Buemi	Renault e.Dams	1:03.667		5^{1}
2	8	(France) Nicolas Prost	Renault e.Dams	1:03.877	+0.210	2^{1}
3	11	(Brazil) Lucas di Grassi	ABT Schaeffler Audi Sport	1:03.990	+0.323	3^{1}
4	7	(Belgium) Jérôme d'Ambrosio	Dragon Racing	1:04.077	+0.325	1^{1}
5	66	(Germany) Daniel Abt	ABT Schaeffler Audi Sport	1:03.667	+0.410	4^{1}
6	25	(France) Jean-Éric Vergne	DS Virgin Racing	1:04.268	+0.601	6
7	55	(Portugal) António Félix da Costa	Team Aguri	1:04.371	+0.704	17^{2}
8	6	(France) Loïc Duval	Dragon Racing	1:04.492	+0.825	7
9	23	(Germany) Nick Heidfeld	Mahindra Racing	1:04.523	+0.856	8
10	4	(France) Stéphane Sarrazin	Venturi	1:04.583	+0.916	9
11	2	(United Kingdom) Sam Bird	DS Virgin Racing	1:04.594	+0.927	10
12	28	(Switzerland) Simona de Silvestro	Amlin Andretti	1:04.606	+0.939	11
13	27	(Netherlands) Robin Frijns	Amlin Andretti	1:04.959	+1.292	12
14	12	(United Kingdom) Mike Conway	Venturi	1:05.108	+1.441	13
15	77	(Mexico) Salvador Durán	Team Aguri	1:05.452	+1.785	14
16	88	(United Kingdom) Oliver Turvey	NEXTEV TCR	1:06.166	+2.499	15
17	21	(Brazil) Bruno Senna	Mahindra Racing	1:07.724	+4.057	16
18	1	(Brazil) Nelson Piquet Jr.	NEXTEV TCR	No time		18

Notes:

- ^1 – Final grid position of top five qualifiers determined by Super Pole shootout.
- ^2 – António Félix da Costa received a ten place penalty for changing the gearbox

=== Super Pole ===
Pos.	No.	Driver	Team	Time	Gap	Grid
1	7	(Belgium) Jérôme d'Ambrosio	Dragon Racing	1:03.705		1
2	8	(France) Nicolas Prost	Renault e.Dams	1:04.013	+0.308	2
3	11	(Brazil) Lucas di Grassi	ABT Schaeffler Audi Sport	1:04.023	+0.318	3
4	66	(Germany) Daniel Abt	ABT Schaeffler Audi Sport	1:04.335	+0.630	4
5	9	(Switzerland) Sébastien Buemi	Renault e.Dams	1:05.183	+1.478	5

=== Race ===
Pos.	No.	Driver	Team	Laps	Time/Retired	Grid	Points
1	7	(Belgium) Jérôme d'Ambrosio	Dragon Racing	43	48:28.409	1	25+3^{3}
2	9	(Switzerland) Sébastien Buemi	Renault e.Dams	43	+0.106	5	18
3	8	(France) Nicolas Prost	Renault e.dams	43	+25.537	2	15+2^{4}
4	6	(France) Loïc Duval	Dragon Racing	43	+26.358^{5}	7	12
5	27	(Netherlands) Robin Frijns	Amlin Andretti	43	+28.477	12	10
6	2	(United Kingdom) Sam Bird	DS Virgin Racing	43	+28.928	10	8
7	66	(Germany) Daniel Abt	ABT Schaeffler Audi Sport	43	+30.051	4	6
8	23	(Germany) Nick Heidfeld	Mahindra Racing	43	+36.373	8	4
9	4	(France) Stéphane Sarrazin	Venturi	43	+37.291	9	2
10	21	(Brazil) Bruno Senna	Mahindra Racing	43	+37.603	16	1
11	88	(United Kingdom) Oliver Turvey	NEXTEV TCR	43	+38.598	15	
12	12	(United Kingdom) Mike Conway	Venturi	43	+38.790	13	
13	1	(Brazil) Nelson Piquet Jr.	NEXTEV TCR	43	+42.351	18	
14	28	(Switzerland) Simona de Silvestro	Amlin Andretti	43	+43.971	11	
15	77	(Mexico) Salvador Durán	Team Aguri	43	+1:03.082	14	
16	25	(France) Jean-Éric Vergne	DS Virgin Racing	42	+1 lap	6	
Ret	55	(Portugal) António Félix da Costa	Team Aguri	32	Accident damage	17	
DSQ	11	(Brazil) Lucas di Grassi	ABT Schaeffler Audi Sport	43	Underweight^{6}	3	

Notes:

- ^3 – Three points for pole position.
- ^4 – Two points for fastest lap.
- ^5 – Loïc Duval received a fifteen second penalty for frequent abuse of track limits.
- ^6 – Lucas di Grassi originally finished first, but was disqualified for having an underweight car.

== Standings after the race ==
Drivers' Championship standings

Pos	Driver	Points
1	(Switzerland) Sébastien Buemi	98
2	(Brazil) Lucas di Grassi	76
3	(United Kingdom) Sam Bird	60
4	(Belgium) Jérôme d'Ambrosio	58
5	(France) Loïc Duval	44

Teams' Championship standings

Pos	Constructor	Points
1	(France) Renault e.Dams	136
2	(United States) Dragon Racing	102
3	(Germany) ABT Schaeffler Audi Sport	92
4	(United Kingdom) DS Virgin Racing	66
5	(India) Mahindra Racing	39

- Notes: Only the top five positions are included for both sets of standings.

Previous race: 2016 Buenos Aires ePrix	FIA Formula E Championship; 2015–16 season	Next race: 2016 Long Beach ePrix
Previous race: N/A	Mexico City ePrix	Next race: 2017 Mexico City ePrix
