= 2015–16 Formula E Championship =

Electric racing car championship

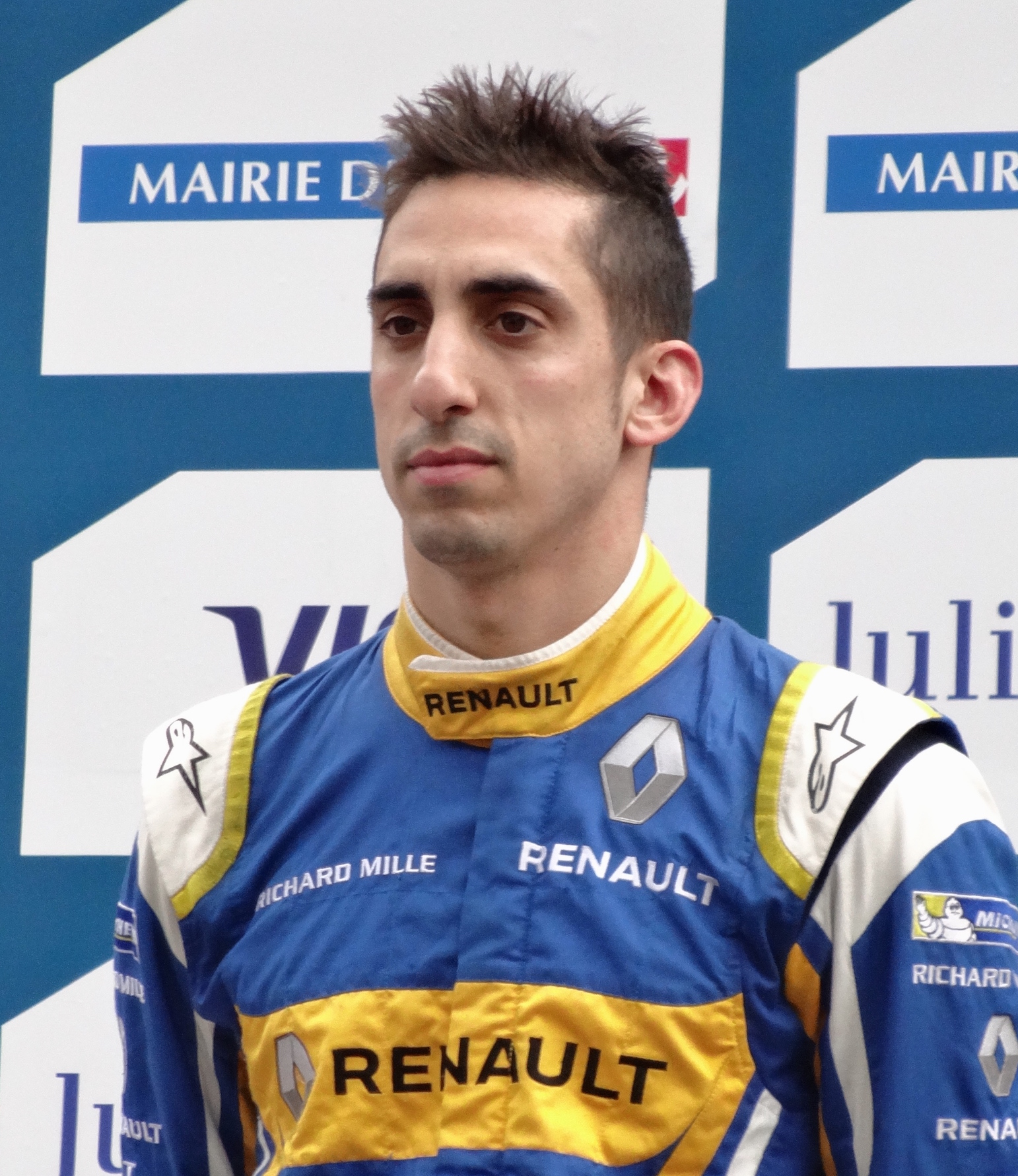
Sébastien Buemi won the Drivers' Championship by 2 points

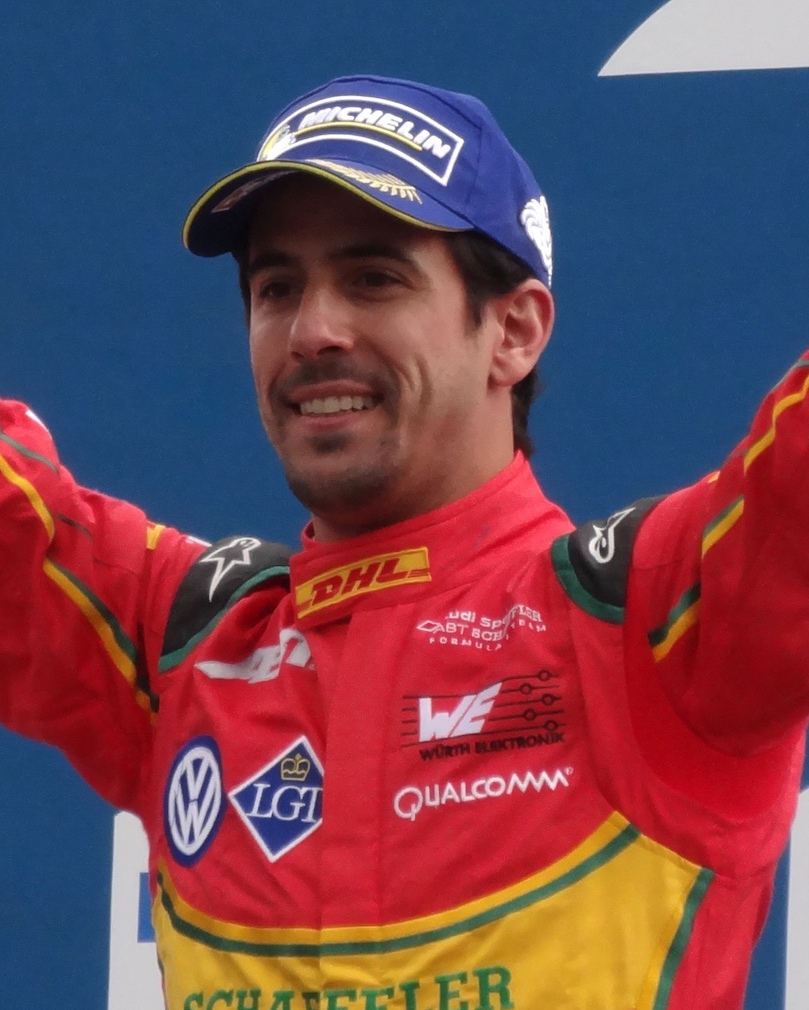
Lucas di Grassi finished the season second, following a controversial crash with Buemi in the final race

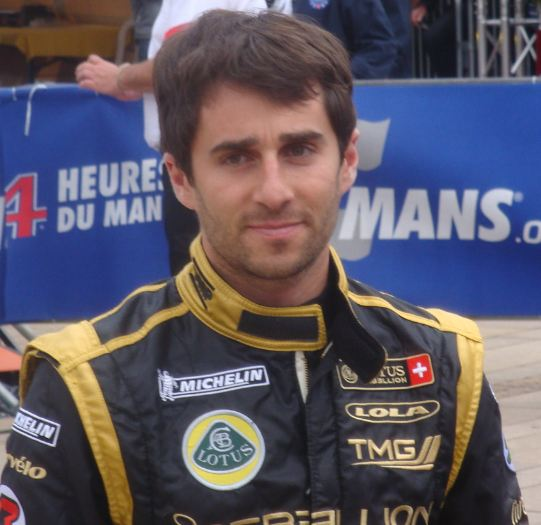
Nicolas Prost (pictured in 2012) finished the season third

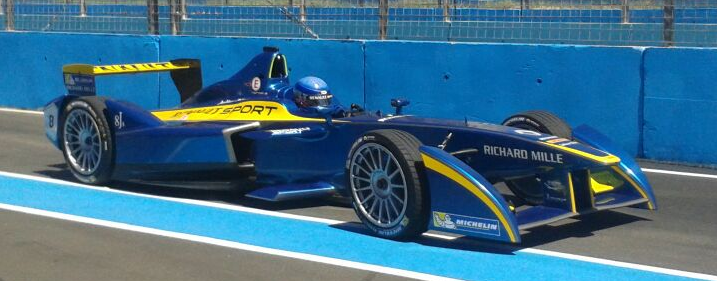
Renault e.dams won the Teams' Championship

The 2015–16 FIA Formula E Championship was the second season of the FIA Formula E championship, held from 24 October 2015 to 3 July 2016. The season saw seven new manufacturers, who were allowed to develop new power trains, specifically the e-motor, the inverter, the gearbox and the cooling system. Nelson Piquet Jr. was the defending Drivers' Champion and Renault e.dams the defending teams' champion. After ten rounds, Sébastien Buemi won the championship by just two points over Lucas di Grassi after setting the fastest lap in the final race, where neither driver finished following an opening lap crash and several attempts to set the fastest lap in their second cars. Renault e.dams retained the teams' championship.

== Teams and drivers ==
The second season was planned to again feature ten teams that were essentially identical from the inaugural season. But, the withdrawal of Trulli after failing to enter the first two races left nine teams competing for the 2015–16 season. Additionally, there were eight manufacturers of power trains that worked together with or were part of the individual teams. Initially only Team Aguri decided to keep the power train from the previous season, while Dragon used the Venturi power train. Due to the regulations, all teams used the same chassis as in the first season. The eight manufacturers were homologated by the FIA in August 2015. After troublesome preseason testing, Andretti decided to revert to the power train from the inaugural season. All teams used the mandated Spark chassis.

Team	Powertrain	No.	Drivers	Rounds
(China) NEXTEV TCR Formula E Team	NEXTEV TCR FormulaE 001	1	(Brazil) Nelson Piquet Jr.	All
(China) NEXTEV TCR Formula E Team	NEXTEV TCR FormulaE 001	88	(United Kingdom) Oliver Turvey	All
(United Kingdom) DS Virgin Racing Formula E Team	Virgin DSV-01	2	(United Kingdom) Sam Bird	All
(United Kingdom) DS Virgin Racing Formula E Team	Virgin DSV-01	25	(France) Jean-Éric Vergne	All
(Monaco) Venturi Formula E Team	Venturi VM200-FE-01	4	(France) Stéphane Sarrazin	All
(Monaco) Venturi Formula E Team	Venturi VM200-FE-01	12	(Canada) Jacques Villeneuve	1–3
(Monaco) Venturi Formula E Team	Venturi VM200-FE-01	12	(United Kingdom) Mike Conway	4–10
(United States) Dragon Racing	Venturi VM200-FE-01	6	(France) Loïc Duval	All
(United States) Dragon Racing	Venturi VM200-FE-01	7	(Belgium) Jérôme d'Ambrosio	All
(France) Renault e.Dams	Renault Z.E 15	8	(France) Nicolas Prost	All
(France) Renault e.Dams	Renault Z.E 15	9	(Switzerland) Sébastien Buemi	All
(Switzerland) Trulli Formula E Team	Motomatica JT-01	10	(Mexico) Salvador Durán	1‡
(Switzerland) Trulli Formula E Team	Motomatica JT-01	10	(Italy) Jarno Trulli	2‡
(Switzerland) Trulli Formula E Team	Motomatica JT-01	18	(Italy) Vitantonio Liuzzi	1–2‡
(Germany) ABT Schaeffler Audi Sport	ABT Schaeffler FE01	11	(Brazil) Lucas di Grassi	All
(Germany) ABT Schaeffler Audi Sport	ABT Schaeffler FE01	66	(Germany) Daniel Abt	All
(India) Mahindra Racing Formula E Team	Mahindra M2ELECTRO	21	(Brazil) Bruno Senna	All
(India) Mahindra Racing Formula E Team	Mahindra M2ELECTRO	23	(Germany) Nick Heidfeld	1–2, 4–10
(India) Mahindra Racing Formula E Team	Mahindra M2ELECTRO	23	(United Kingdom) Oliver Rowland	3
(United States) Amlin Andretti Formula E Team	SRT01-e	27	(Netherlands) Robin Frijns	All
(United States) Amlin Andretti Formula E Team	SRT01-e	28	(Switzerland) Simona de Silvestro	All
(Japan) Team Aguri	SRT01-e	55	(Portugal) António Félix da Costa	1–7, 9–10
(Japan) Team Aguri	SRT01-e	55	(Germany) René Rast	8
(Japan) Team Aguri	SRT01-e	77	(France) Nathanaël Berthon	1–3
(Japan) Team Aguri	SRT01-e	77	(Mexico) Salvador Durán	4–6
(Japan) Team Aguri	SRT01-e	77	(China) Ma Qinghua	7–10

‡ Drivers were present at the first two rounds of the championship, but the team failed to pass scrutineering both times.

=== Team changes ===
- All ten teams from the first season intended to compete in season two, with some name changes due to sponsorship changes or manufacturer cooperations.
- Eight teams became manufacturers and produce components either by themselves or with a technology partner: Abt (with Schaeffler), Andretti, e.Dams (with Renault) Mahindra, NEXTEV, Trulli (with Motomatica), Venturi, and Virgin (with DS Automobiles). On 25 August 2015, Andretti decided to retain the powertrain from the previous season.
- After failing to pass scrutineering of their new drivetrain for the first two races, Trulli withdrew from the championship, leaving 9 teams to compete for the rest of the season.

=== Driver changes ===
- Karun Chandhok, Jaime Alguersuari and Jarno Trulli; who raced for Mahindra, Virgin and Trulli respectively in the 2014–15 season; announced that they would not compete in 2015–16.
- 1997 Formula One World Champion Jacques Villeneuve joined Venturi, replacing Nick Heidfeld, who moved to Mahindra.
- Jean-Éric Vergne, who joined Andretti mid-way through the 2014–15 season, moved to Virgin for a full-time drive, replacing Alguersuari.
- 2012 Formula Renault 3.5 champion Robin Frijns joined the series, driving for Andretti, replacing Vergne.
- Salvador Durán, who competed for Amlin Aguri during the 2014–15 season, joined the Trulli team, replacing Jarno Trulli.
- Oliver Turvey, who raced for Team China in the London round of the 2014–15 season, joined the team full-time.
- GP2 Series veteran Nathanaël Berthon was chosen for the second Team Aguri seat.

=== Mid-season changes ===
- Following a hand injury sustained in Putrajaya, Nick Heidfeld was forced to miss the next round in Punta del Este. He was replaced by reigning Formula Renault 3.5 champion Oliver Rowland.
- After three rounds with the Venturi team, Jacques Villeneuve left due to a "disagreement on the direction of the team". His seat was taken by Mike Conway.
- After three rounds Salvador Durán re-joined Team Aguri for the rest of the season after they split with Nathanaël Berthon. The Mexican driver already competed in nine rounds of the first season for Team Aguri. After another three rounds, he was replaced by Chinese driver Ma Qinghua for the Paris ePrix. Ma then competed in the Berlin ePrix and the two races of the London ePrix.
- Due to a DTM commitment, António Félix da Costa missed round 8 at Berlin, but returned for the London ePrix. His replacement was endurance racer René Rast.
- Due to a Super GT commitment, Oliver Turvey was set to be replaced by European Le Mans Series driver Ben Hanley at the Berlin ePrix. However, the Super GT event was postponed because of the Kumamoto earthquakes, and Turvey was reinstated into his NEXTEV TCR seat.

== Rule changes ==
- The rules were opened up for the second season, in keeping with the series' long-term plan to use a single car over the course of a race instead of two separate chassis. Teams were free to pursue their own development of the powertrain, including the e-motor, inverter, gearbox and cooling system.
- The maximum power usage during the race was increased from 150 kilowatts (200 bhp) to 170 kilowatts (230 bhp). The total allowed energy consumption from the battery remained limited to 28 kWh.

== Calendar ==
The season was scheduled to include 11 races, held between October 2015 and July 2016. The final calendar was approved by the World Motor Sport Council in October 2015. However, in May 2016, the Moscow ePrix was cancelled "due to recent and unforeseen circumstances related to road closures", reducing the season to 10 races.

Round	ePrix	Country	Track	Date
1	Beijing ePrix	China	Beijing Olympic Green Circuit	24 October 2015
2	Putrajaya ePrix	Malaysia	Putrajaya Street Circuit	7 November 2015
3	Punta del Este ePrix	Uruguay	Punta del Este Street Circuit	19 December 2015
4	Buenos Aires ePrix	Argentina	Puerto Madero Street Circuit	6 February 2016
5	Mexico City ePrix	Mexico	Autódromo Hermanos Rodríguez	12 March 2016
6	Long Beach ePrix	United States	Long Beach Street Circuit	2 April 2016
7	Paris ePrix	France	Paris Street Circuit	23 April 2016
8	Berlin ePrix	Germany	Berlin Street Circuit	21 May 2016
9	London ePrix Race 1	United Kingdom	Battersea Park Street Circuit	2 July 2016
10	London ePrix Race 2	United Kingdom	Battersea Park Street Circuit	3 July 2016

=== Calendar changes ===
- The Miami ePrix was dropped after the first season. The Monaco ePrix did not feature in this season's calendar, but returned the following season.
- The Mexico City ePrix - the first race on a permanent racing circuit - and the Paris ePrix were new additions to the calendar.
- The Berlin ePrix moved from Tempelhof Airport to the city centre.
- The Moscow ePrix was cancelled in mid-season.

=== ePrix locations ===
Location of ePrix in season 2.
(ePrix – single race)
(ePrix – double race)

== Race results ==
Round	Race	Pole position	Fastest lap	Winning driver	Winning team	Report
1	(China) Beijing	(Switzerland) Sébastien Buemi	(Switzerland) Sébastien Buemi	(Switzerland) Sébastien Buemi	(France) Renault e.Dams	Report
2	(Malaysia) Putrajaya	(Switzerland) Sébastien Buemi	(Switzerland) Sébastien Buemi	(Brazil) Lucas di Grassi	(Germany) ABT Schaeffler Audi Sport	Report
3	(Uruguay) Punta del Este	(Belgium) Jérôme d'Ambrosio	(Switzerland) Sébastien Buemi	(Switzerland) Sébastien Buemi	(France) Renault e.Dams	Report
4	(Argentina) Buenos Aires	(United Kingdom) Sam Bird	(Belgium) Jérôme d'Ambrosio	(United Kingdom) Sam Bird	(United Kingdom) DS Virgin Racing Formula E Team	Report
5	Mexico City	(Belgium) Jérôme d'Ambrosio	(France) Nicolas Prost (Note: Jérôme d'Ambrosio set the fastest lap during the race but his lap was removed due to corner-cutting.)	(Belgium) Jérôme d'Ambrosio (Note: Lucas di Grassi and Audi Sport Abt were the initial winners but were disqualified when di Grassi's car was found to be underweight.)	(United States) Dragon Racing	Report
6	(United States) Long Beach	(United Kingdom) Sam Bird (Note: António Félix da Costa set the fastest time but he was excluded due to an irregular tyre pressure level.)	(Switzerland) Sébastien Buemi	(Brazil) Lucas di Grassi	(Germany) ABT Schaeffler Audi Sport	Report
7	(France) Paris	(United Kingdom) Sam Bird	(Germany) Nick Heidfeld	(Brazil) Lucas di Grassi	(Germany) ABT Schaeffler Audi Sport	Report
8	(Germany) Berlin	(France) Jean-Éric Vergne	(Brazil) Bruno Senna	(Switzerland) Sébastien Buemi	(France) Renault e.Dams	Report
9	(United Kingdom) London	(France) Nicolas Prost	(Brazil) Nelson Piquet Jr.	(France) Nicolas Prost	(France) Renault e.Dams	Report
10	(United Kingdom) London	(Switzerland) Sébastien Buemi	(Switzerland) Sébastien Buemi	(France) Nicolas Prost	(France) Renault e.Dams	Report

== Championship standings ==
Points system

Championship points are awarded as follows:

Position	**1st**	**2nd**	**3rd**	**4th**	**5th**	**6th**	**7th**	**8th**	**9th**	**10th**	**Pole**	**FL**
Points	25	18	15	12	10	8	6	4	2	1	3	2

Unlike the previous season, all results count towards the total.

=== Drivers' Championship ===
Pos.	Driver	BEI (China)	PUT (Malaysia)	PDE (Uruguay)	BUE (Argentina)	MEX (Mexico)	LBH (United States)	PAR (France)	BER (Germany)	LDN (United Kingdom)		Pts
1	(Switzerland) Sébastien Buemi	**1**	**12**	1	2	2	16	3*	1*	5*	**Ret***	155
2	(Brazil) Lucas di Grassi	2	1	2	3*	DSQ*	1*	1	3	4*	Ret*	153
3	(France) Nicolas Prost	Ret	10	5	5	3	11	4	4	**1**	1	115
4	(United Kingdom) Sam Bird	7*	2	Ret*	**1***	6	**6**	**6**	11	7	Ret	88
5	(Belgium) Jérôme d'Ambrosio	5	14†	**3**	16	**1**	7*	11	16	8	3	83
6	(France) Stéphane Sarrazin	9	4	9*	4	9	2	5	10*	10	5*	70
7	(Germany) Daniel Abt	11	7	8	13	7	3	10	2	Ret	2	68
8	(France) Loïc Duval	4	16†	4	6	4	8	Ret*	Ret	Ret	4	60
9	(France) Jean-Éric Vergne	12	Ret	7*	11*	16*	13	2*	**5**	3	8	56
10	(Germany) Nick Heidfeld	3	9*		7	8	4*	12	7*	13*	7	53
11	(Brazil) Bruno Senna	13	5	Ret	10	10	5	9	15	2	6	52
12	(Netherlands) Robin Frijns	10	3	10	8	5	15	7	6	Ret	Ret	45
13	(Portugal) António Félix da Costa	Ret	6	6	Ret	Ret	Ret	8		6	11	28
14	(United Kingdom) Oliver Turvey	6*	Ret*	12	9	11	12	13	12	15†	10	11
15	(Brazil) Nelson Piquet Jr.	15†*	8*	15†	12	13	Ret	Ret	13	12	9	8
16	(United Kingdom) Mike Conway				15	12	10	14	8	9	13	7
17	(France) Nathanaël Berthon	8	15	14								4
18	(Switzerland) Simona de Silvestro	Ret	13	11	14	14	9	15	9	14	Ret	4
19	(China) Ma Qinghua							Ret	14	11	12	0
20	(Canada) Jacques Villeneuve	14	11	DNS								0
21	(United Kingdom) Oliver Rowland			13								0
22	(Mexico) Salvador Durán	DNP			Ret	15*	14					0
23	(Germany) René Rast								NC			0
	(Italy) Vitantonio Liuzzi	DNP	DNP									0
	(Italy) Jarno Trulli		DNP									0
Pos.	Driver	BEI (China)	PUT (Malaysia)	PDE (Uruguay)	BUE (Argentina)	MEX (Mexico)	LBH (United States)	PAR (France)	BER (Germany)	LDN (United Kingdom)		Pts

Colour	Result
Gold	Winner
Silver	Second place
Bronze	Third place
Green	Points classification
Blue	Non-points classification
Blue	Non-classified finish (NC)
Purple	Retired, not classified (Ret)
Red	Did not qualify (DNQ)
Red	Did not pre-qualify (DNPQ)
Black	Disqualified (DSQ)
White	Did not start (DNS)
White	Withdrew (WD)
White	Race cancelled (C)
Blank	Did not practice (DNP)
Blank	Did not arrive (DNA)
Blank	Excluded (EX)

**Bold** – Pole
Italics – Fastest Lap
* – FanBoost

Notes

† – Drivers did not finish the race, but were classified as they completed more than 90% of the race distance.

=== Teams' Championship ===
Pos.	Team	No.	BEI (China)	PUT (Malaysia)	PDE (Uruguay)	BUE (Argentina)	MEX (Mexico)	LBH (United States)	PAR (France)	BER (Germany)	LDN (United Kingdom)		Points
1	(France) Renault e.Dams	8	Ret	10	5	5	3	11	4	4	**1**	1	270
1	(France) Renault e.Dams	9	**1**	**12**	1	2	2	16	3*	1*	5*	**Ret***	270
2	(Germany) ABT Schaeffler Audi Sport	11	2	1	2	3*	DSQ*	1*	1	3	4*	Ret*	221
2	(Germany) ABT Schaeffler Audi Sport	66	11	7	8	13	7	3	10	2	Ret	2	221
3	(United Kingdom) DS Virgin Racing	2	7*	2	Ret*	**1***	6	**6**	**6**	11	7	Ret	144
3	(United Kingdom) DS Virgin Racing	25	12	Ret	7*	11*	16*	13	2*	**5**	3	8	144
4	(United States) Dragon Racing	6	4	16†	4	6	4	8	Ret*	Ret	Ret	4	143
4	(United States) Dragon Racing	7	5	14†	**3**	16	**1**	7*	11	16	8	3	143
5	(India) Mahindra Racing	21	13	5	Ret	10	10	5	9	15	2	6	105
5	(India) Mahindra Racing	23	3	9*	13	7	8	4*	12	7*	13*	7	105
6	(Monaco) Venturi	4	9	4	9*	4	9	2	5	10*	10	5*	77
6	(Monaco) Venturi	12	14	11	DNS	15	12	10	14	8	9	13	77
7	(United States) Amlin Andretti	27	10	3	10	8	5	15	7	6	Ret	Ret	49
7	(United States) Amlin Andretti	28	Ret	13	11	14	14	9	15	9	14	Ret	49
8	(Japan) Team Aguri	55	Ret	6	6	Ret	Ret	Ret	8	NC	6	11	32
8	(Japan) Team Aguri	77	8	15	14	Ret	15*	14	Ret	14	11	12	32
9	(China) NEXTEV TCR	1	15†*	8*	15†	12	13	Ret	Ret	13	12	9	19
9	(China) NEXTEV TCR	88	6*	Ret*	12	9	11	12	13	12	15†	10	19
	(Switzerland) Trulli	10	DNP	DNP									0
	(Switzerland) Trulli	18	DNP	DNP									0
Pos.	Team	No.	BEI (China)	PUT (Malaysia)	PDE (Uruguay)	BUE (Argentina)	MEX (Mexico)	LBH (United States)	PAR (France)	BER (Germany)	LDN (United Kingdom)		Points

Colour	Result
Gold	Winner
Silver	Second place
Bronze	Third place
Green	Points classification
Blue	Non-points classification
Blue	Non-classified finish (NC)
Purple	Retired, not classified (Ret)
Red	Did not qualify (DNQ)
Red	Did not pre-qualify (DNPQ)
Black	Disqualified (DSQ)
White	Did not start (DNS)
White	Withdrew (WD)
White	Race cancelled (C)
Blank	Did not practice (DNP)
Blank	Did not arrive (DNA)
Blank	Excluded (EX)

**Bold** – Pole
Italics – Fastest Lap
* – FanBoost

Notes

† – Drivers did not finish the race, but were classified as they completed more than 90% of the race distance.
