= Long Beach ePrix =

Formula E race

- Long Beach Street Circuit (2015–2016)

Race information
- Number of times held: 2
- First held: 2015
- Last held: 2016
- Circuit length: 2.131 km (1.324 miles)
- Race length: 87.37 km (54.29 miles)

Last race (2016)

Pole position
- (United Kingdom) Sam Bird; DS Virgin; 0:57.261

Podium
- 1. (Brazil) L. di Grassi; ABT; 45:11.582; 2. (France) S. Sarrazin; Venturi; +0.787; 3. (Germany) D. Abt; ABT; +1.685

Fastest lap
- (Switzerland) Sébastien Buemi; e.Dams; 0:57.938

The Long Beach ePrix was an annual race of the single-seater, electrically powered Formula E championship, held in Long Beach, United States. It was raced in the 2014–15 and the 2015–16 seasons.

== Circuit ==
A modified version of the Long Beach Grand Prix track was used for this ePrix. The track was 2.131 km (1.324 mi) in length and featured seven turns.

== Results ==
Edition	Track	Winner	Second	Third	Pole position	Fastest lap	Ref
2015	Long Beach	(Brazil) Nelson Piquet Jr. China Racing	(France) Jean-Éric Vergne; Andretti Autosport	(Brazil) Lucas di Grassi; Abt Sportsline	(Germany) Daniel Abt; Abt Sportsline	(France) Nicolas Prost e.dams Renault	
2016	Long Beach	(Brazil) Lucas di Grassi; ABT Schaeffler Audi Sport	(France) Stéphane Sarrazin; Venturi	(Germany) Daniel Abt; ABT Schaeffler Audi Sport	(United Kingdom) Sam Bird; DS Virgin Racing	(Switzerland) Sébastien Buemi; Renault e.Dams	
