= 2016 Paris ePrix =

Formula E electric car race

Race 7 of 10 of the 2015–16 Formula E Championship
← Previous race	Next race →
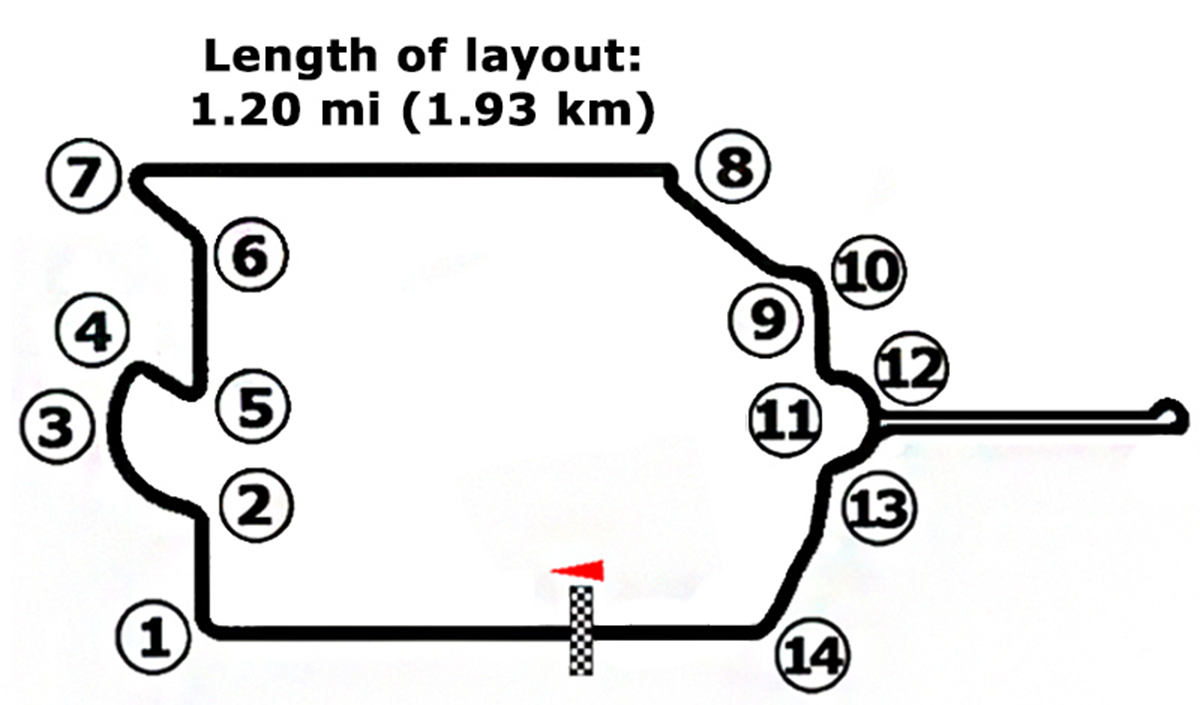
- Layout of the Paris Street Circuit

Race details
- Date: 23 April 2016
- Official name: 2016 Visa Paris ePrix
- Location: Circuit des Invalides, Les Invalides, Paris, France
- Course: Street circuit
- Course length: 1.93 km (1.2 miles)
- Distance: 45 laps, 86.85 km (54 miles)
- Weather: Cold and cloudy

Pole position
Driver	(United Kingdom) Sam Bird	Virgin
- Time: 1.01.616

Fastest lap
Driver	(Germany) Nick Heidfeld	Mahindra
- Time: 1.02.323 on lap 39

Podium
First	(Brazil) Lucas di Grassi	Audi Sport ABT
Second	(France) Jean-Éric Vergne	Virgin
Third	(Switzerland) Sébastien Buemi	e.dams-Renault

The 2016 Paris ePrix (formally the 2016 Visa Paris ePrix) was a Formula E electric car race held on 23 April 2016 at the Circuit des Invalides in the Les Invalides building complex. A total of 20,000 people attended the race. It was the seventh round of the 2015–16 Formula E Championship and the first Paris ePrix. The 45-lap race was won by Audi Sport ABT driver Lucas di Grassi starting from second position. Jean-Éric Vergne finished second for Virgin and e.Dams-Renault's Sébastien Buemi took third. It was di Grassi's second consecutive victory after the Long Beach ePrix, his third of the season and the fourth of his career.

Sam Bird won the pole position by posting the fastest lap in qualifying but was passed by di Grassi at the start due to a mapping problem that gave him excess wheelspin. Bird could not retake the lead from di Grassi who drew clear from him and got into a battle with his teammate Vergne as Buemi was moving through the field and drew closer to the pair. After the pit stops for the mandatory switch into a second car, di Grassi kept the lead and continued pulling away from the pack and looked set to win comfortably until the race ended under the safety car for a crash involving Ma Qinghua on lap 40.

The consequences of the final positions increased di Grassi's Drivers' Championship lead over Buemi to 11 points while Bird retained third position despite an late race error. Jérôme d'Ambrosio maintained fourth but his lead over the fifth-placed Stéphane Sarrazin was reduced to six points. In the Teams' Championship, e.Dams-Renault grew their lead over Audi Sport ABT by one point and Virgin drew closer to Dragon in third with three rounds left in the season.

== Background and preparations ==
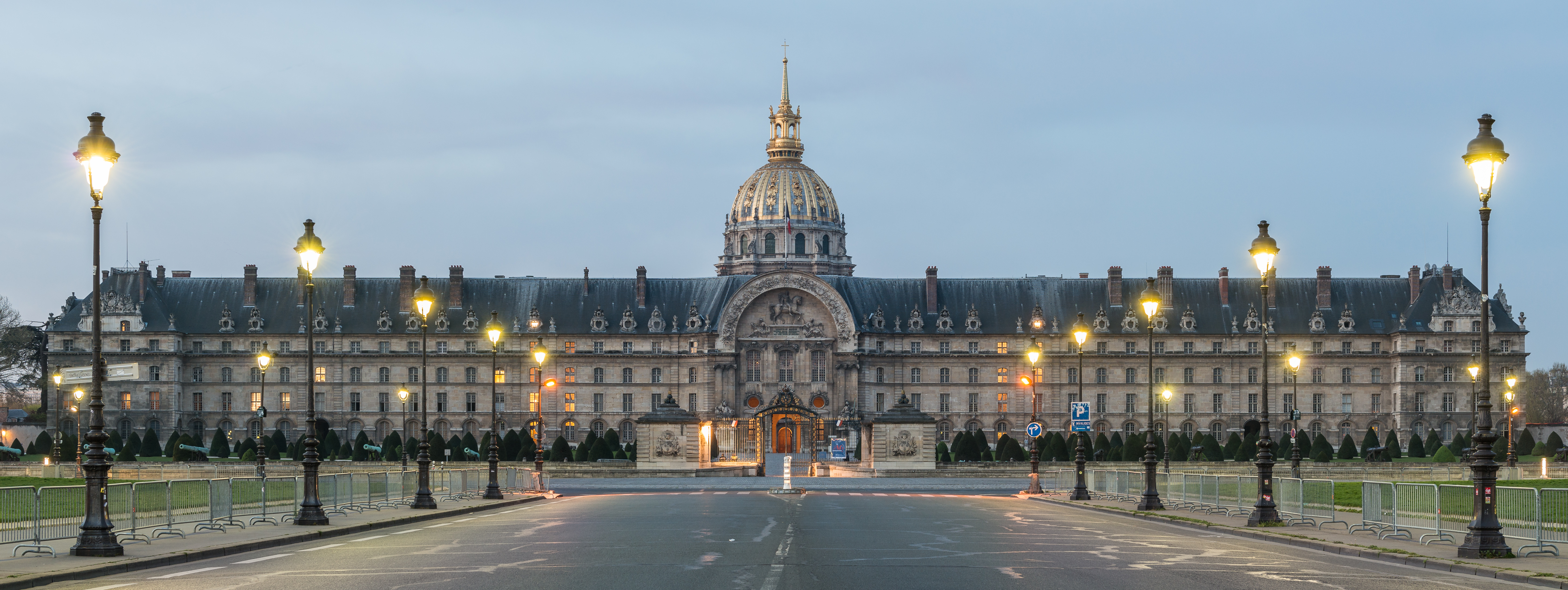
The Esplanade des Invalides, where the track's pit lane was located.

After winning the Long Beach ePrix three weeks earlier, Audi Sport ABT driver Lucas di Grassi led the Drivers' Championship with 101 points and Sébastien Buemi of e.Dams-Renault was one point behind in second place. Virgin's Sam Bird was in third with 71 points, seven ahead of Jérôme d'Ambrosio for Dragon in fourth. Stéphane Sarrazin of Venturi was fifth with 48 points. e.Dams-Renault led the Teams' Championship with 138 points, six ahead of Audi Sport ABT in second. Dragon were third with 112 points, and Virgin on 77 points and Mahindra with 61 points were fourth and fifth.

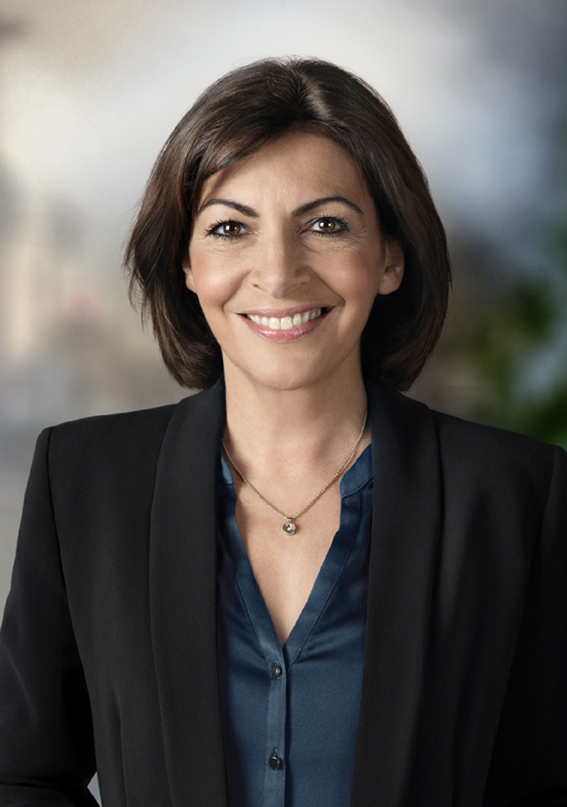
Anne Hidalgo (pictured in 2014) was instrumental in the return of motor racing to Paris for the first time since 1951.

There were nine teams each entering two drivers for a total of 18 drivers competing in the event. There was one change of driver before the race. Having been in one of the Aguri cars since the third round of the season in Buenos Aires, Salvador Durán was replaced by World Touring Car Championship race winner and former Formula One test driver Ma Qinghua for the rest of the season. Ma was the second driver that Aguri nominated to drive for them outside of reasons of force majeure after Duran replaced Nathanaël Berthon earlier in the season. The stewards granted Aguri's approval to allow Ma to compete the before the event. Ma spoke of his excitement of competing in the series and handling a Formula E car and managing electrical energy.

In the 1980s, the Fédération Internationale de l'Automobile (FIA) president Jean Todt and four-time Formula One World Champion Alain Prost were part of a group that lobbied politicians for a Formula One race in the streets of the French capital of Paris but were unsuccessful due to concerns over noise and potential damage to the local infrastructure. The plan for a race in Paris was revived in 2014 when Formula E began preparations with the city's mayor and environmentalist Anne Hidalgo, who entered into discussions with series representatives about such an event occurring. Series officials later studied more than twenty areas in and outside of Paris before settling on the Les Invalides building complex in the 7th arrondissement, which they felt was best suited for motor racing. These plans were publicly revealed to Le Parisien in September 2014 by Formula E founder and CEO Alejandro Agag who wanted the race to be the first in the 2015–16 season.

The ePrix was announced as part of the provisional calendar by the FIA World Motor Sport Council in July 2015, and was officially confirmed three months later as the seventh of ten single-seater electric car rounds of the season. Prior to the ePrix, the 18th in Formula E history, Paris last hosted a street circuit race at the Bois de Boulogne in 1951, and the last major international single seater motor race to be held in France was the 2008 French Grand Prix at the Circuit de Nevers Magny-Cours. Organisers expected 20,000 people in attendance. The layout of the Rodgrigo Nunes-designed 1.93 km (1.20 mi) 14-turn clockwise Circuit des Invalides was unveiled to the public at the Hôtel de Ville on 13 January 2016. The circuit goes around Les Invalides with the Musée de l'Armée and the tomb of Napoleon. The pit lane is located along the Esplanade des Invalides, north of Les Invalides. The construction of the track began the week before the race and ended the day before it was held.

== Practice ==
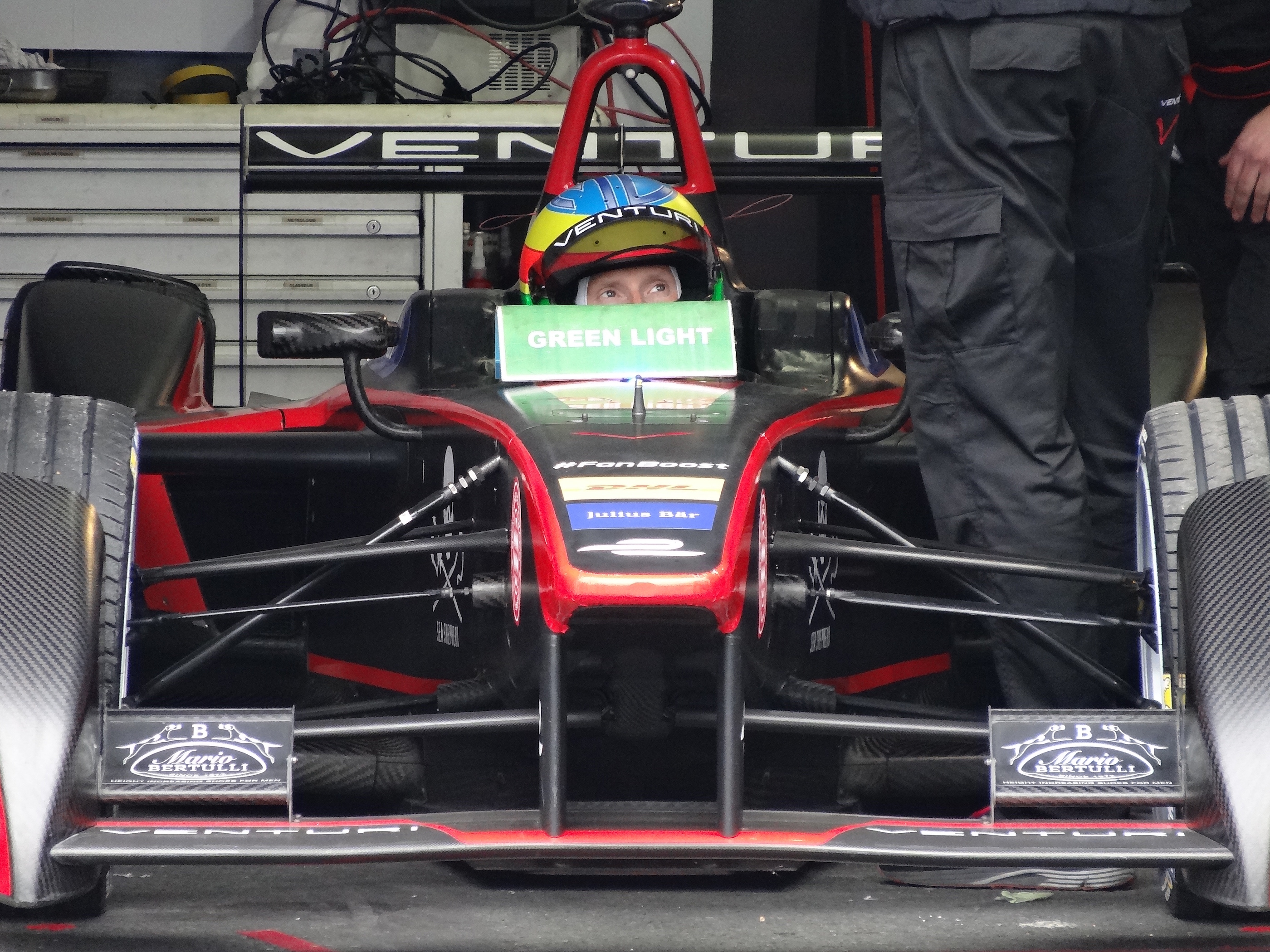
Mike Conway set the fastest overall lap time of the weekend during the second practice session but was collected by Nick Heidfeld in group qualifying.

Two practice sessions—both on Saturday morning—were held before the late afternoon race. The first session ran for 45 minutes and the second for 30 minutes. The half-hour shakedown session on Friday afternoon was cancelled as the roads used by Formula E were not closed until later that evening for logistical reasons. Buemi used 200 kW (270 hp) of power to set the fastest lap of the first session, held in cold and cloudy weather, at 1 minute, 2.841 seconds, followed by di Grassi, Sarrazin, Bird, Mike Conway of Venturi, Loïc Duval for Dragon, Daniel Abt of Audi Sport ABT, the Mahindras of Bruno Senna and Nick Heidfeld, and NextEV's Nelson Piquet Jr. During the session, where several drivers ventured off the circuit leaving turns one and eight, the session was red-flagged halfway through for d'Ambrosio who stopped into turn one with a battery management system failure and required extraction from the track. Abt recovered from one of the track's run-off areas but avoided crashing as he entered into the path of Nico Prost's e.Dams-Renault.

Conway led the second practice with the weekend's fastest time of 1 minute, 1.386 seconds. The Virgin pair of Jean-Éric Vergne and Bird were second and third. Positions four to ten were occupied by Di Grassi, Sarrazin, Senna, António Félix da Costa for Aguri, Prost, Andretti's Robin Frijns and Abt. As in the previous session some drivers went into the run-off areas but avoided damaging their cars. Yellow flags were shown five minutes in after Sarrazin lost control of his car, and crashed under braking for turn eight, breaking his front-left suspension and front wing. The need for a stoppage however was not required as Sarrazin returned to the pit lane. Immediately after, Bird hit the turn eight barrier, damaging his left-rear suspension; he returned to the pit lane.

== Qualifying ==
Saturday afternoon's 60-minute qualifying session was divided into four groups equally into three or five cars. Each group was determined by a lottery system and was permitted six minutes of on-track activity. All drivers were limited to two timed laps with one at maximum power. The fastest five overall competitors in the four groups participated in a "Super Pole" session with one driver on the track at any time going out in reverse order from fifth to first. Each of the five drivers was limited to one timed lap and the starting order of the ePrix was determined by the competitor's fastest times. The driver and team who recorded the fastest time were awarded three points towards their respective championships. Qualifying took place in cold ambient weather conditions of 12 °C (54 °F) which made it difficult for drivers to generate warmth into their tyres and brakes.

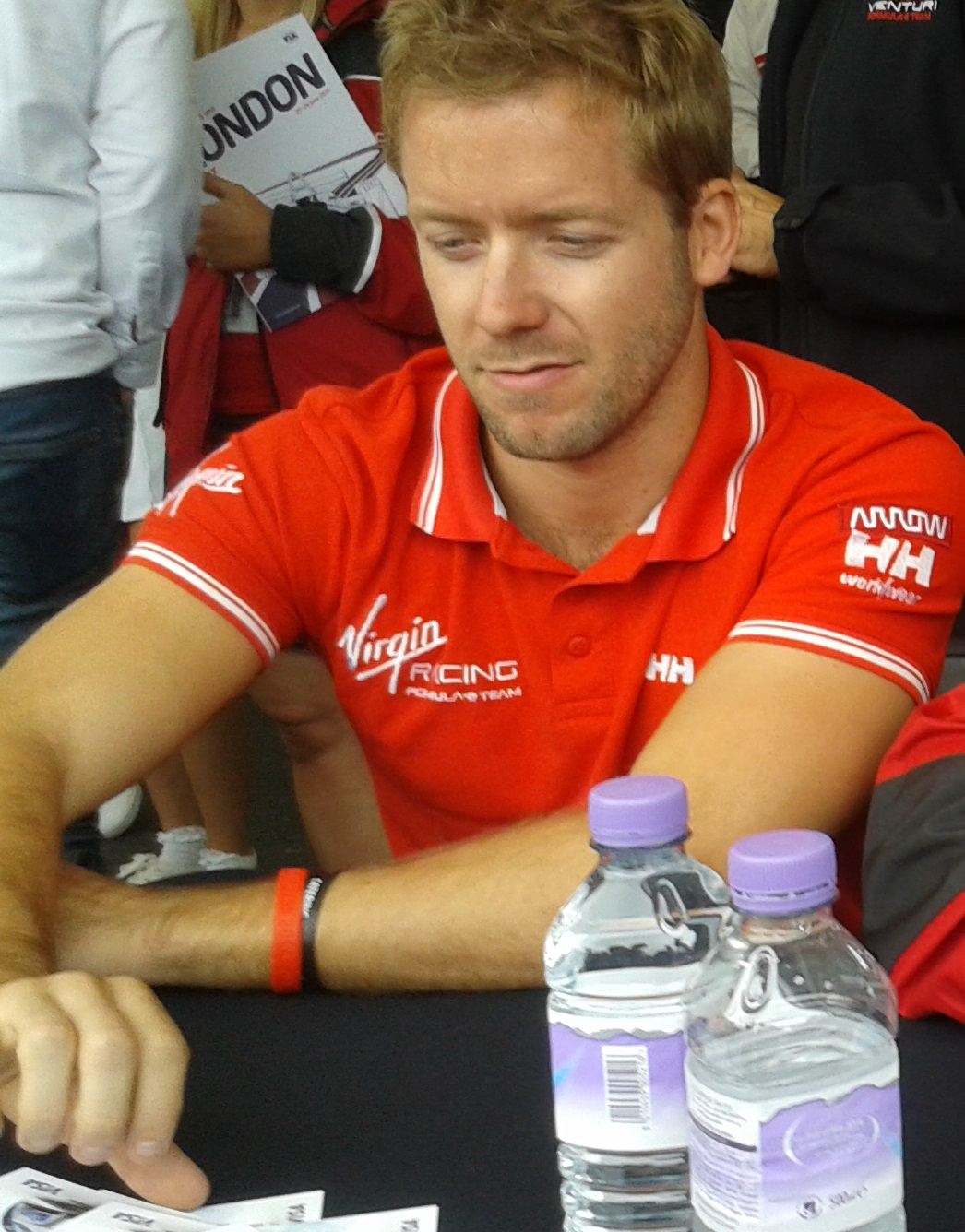
Sam Bird (pictured in 2015) took his second consecutive pole position after the Long Beach ePrix and the third of his career.

In the first group, Buemi set the early benchmark pace as the red flags were waved for an accident at turn 11. Heidfeld was on his maximum power lap when he lost control of his car into the corner and struck the tyre barrier before stopping. Heidfeld tried to rejoin the track as Conway came into his path; the two collided and damaged the front of their cars. Both drivers returned to the pit lane to have their cars repaired before the race. Debris was littered across the circuit. Conway did not use his second car because it was not fully charged but Heidfeld apologised to him. 1 minute and 49 seconds were left to run but the group was lengthened to three minutes to allow for an out-lap and one maximum power attempt. Buemi was not allowed another try since he had already set his maximum power lap along with Heidfeld who was barred for having been deemed to have caused the crash with Conway. Sarrazin led group one's with Buemi second and Duval third. Conway and Heidfeld were the group's slowest two drivers. Vergne led the second group and di Grassi and Frijns were second and third. Piquet came fourth and Abt was the group's slowest competitor. In the third group, Prost was fastest and demoted his teammate Buemi from super pole. No one else in group three entered the overall top five as NextEV's Oliver Turvey got his overweight car into second. The group's slowest three drivers were d'Ambrosio, Senna and Simona de Silvestro of Andretti.

The final group saw Bird set the fastest overall lap of group qualifying at 1 minute, 1.514 seconds and was more than a quarter of a second quicker than teammate Vergne. Félix da Costa was second fastest and Ma was group four's slowest competitor after twice avoiding a crash in the final two corners on his best lap. At the end of group qualifying, the lap times set by Bird, Vergne, Sarrazin, di Grassi and Prost qualified them for super pole. Bird was the last driver to venture onto the circuit and, although he was slower in the first third of the lap, he made up time later on to take his second successive pole position and the third of his career with a lap of 1 minute, 1.616 seconds. He was joined on the grid's front row by di Grassi who locked his brakes into a corner, missed an apex, and held the pole until the latter's lap. Vergne, third, sought his first pole position of the season but did not accomplish this goal as he lost time in the first sector. Sarrazin was slow in the first third of the lap and took fourth while Prost struggled on the cold track and narrowly avoided striking the barrier at turn two to claim fifth. Behind Prost the rest of the grid lined up as Frijns, Turvey, Buemi, Piquet, Félix da Costa, d'Ambrosio, de Silvestro, Senna, Abt, Ma, Duval, Conway and Heidfeld.

=== Qualifying classification ===
Final qualifying classification
Pos.	No.	Driver	Team	GS	SP	Grid
1	2	(United Kingdom) Sam Bird	Virgin	1:01.514	1:01.616	1
2	11	(Brazil) Lucas di Grassi	Audi Sport ABT	1:02.249	1:01.932	2
3	25	(France) Jean-Éric Vergne	Virgin	1:01.770	1:01.993	3
4	4	(France) Stéphane Sarrazin	Venturi	1:02.148	1:02.550	4
5	8	(France) Nico Prost	e.Dams-Renault	1:02.339	1:02.704	5
6	27	(Netherlands) Robin Frijns	Andretti	1:02.405	—N/a	6
7	88	(United Kingdom) Oliver Turvey	NextEV TCR	1:02.492	—N/a	7
8	9	(Switzerland) Sébastien Buemi	e.Dams-Renault	1:02.661	—N/a	8
9	1	(Brazil) Nelson Piquet Jr.	NextEV TCR	1:02.685	—N/a	9
10	55	(Portugal) António Félix da Costa	Aguri	1:02.747	—N/a	10
11	7	(Belgium) Jérôme d'Ambrosio	Dragon	1:02.797	—N/a	11
12	28	(Switzerland) Simona de Silvestro	Andretti	1:02.888	—N/a	12
13	21	(Brazil) Bruno Senna	Mahindra	1:02.915	—N/a	13
14	66	(Germany) Daniel Abt	Audi Sport ABT	1:03.081	—N/a	14
15	77	(China) Ma Qinghua	Aguri	1:03.655	—N/a	15
16	6	(France) Loïc Duval	Dragon	1:03.787	—N/a	16
17	17	(United Kingdom) Mike Conway	Venturi	1:04.798	—N/a	17
18	23	(Germany) Nick Heidfeld	Mahindra	1:11.853	—N/a	18

== Race ==
The weather conditions at the start was dry but cloudy and cold with the air temperature between 11.4 and 12 °C (52.5 and 53.6 °F) and the track temperature ranged from 17.25 to 17.75 °C (63.05 to 63.95 °F). A special feature of Formula E is the "Fan Boost" feature, an additional 100 kW (130 hp) of power to use in the driver's second car. The three drivers who were allowed to use the boost were determined by a fan vote. For the Paris race, Buemi, Duval and Vergne were handed the extra power. The race began before 20,000 people at 16:04 Central European Summer Time (UTC+02:00). Bird spun his tyres due to a mapping problem and he lost the lead to di Grassi who was to the inside of him on the approach to the first corner and pushed him out wide. This gave Vergne the opportunity to find his way past his teammate Bird on the inside at the exit of turn two after they touched wheels. Overtakes occurred further down the field as Prost overtook Sarrazin for fourth, while Frijns fell from sixth to ninth. Félix da Costa momentarily moved to seventh until Buemi overtook him. Despite competitors having difficulty getting heat into their tyres, the field avoided causing an incident on the tight track as the top five settled into their respective positions.

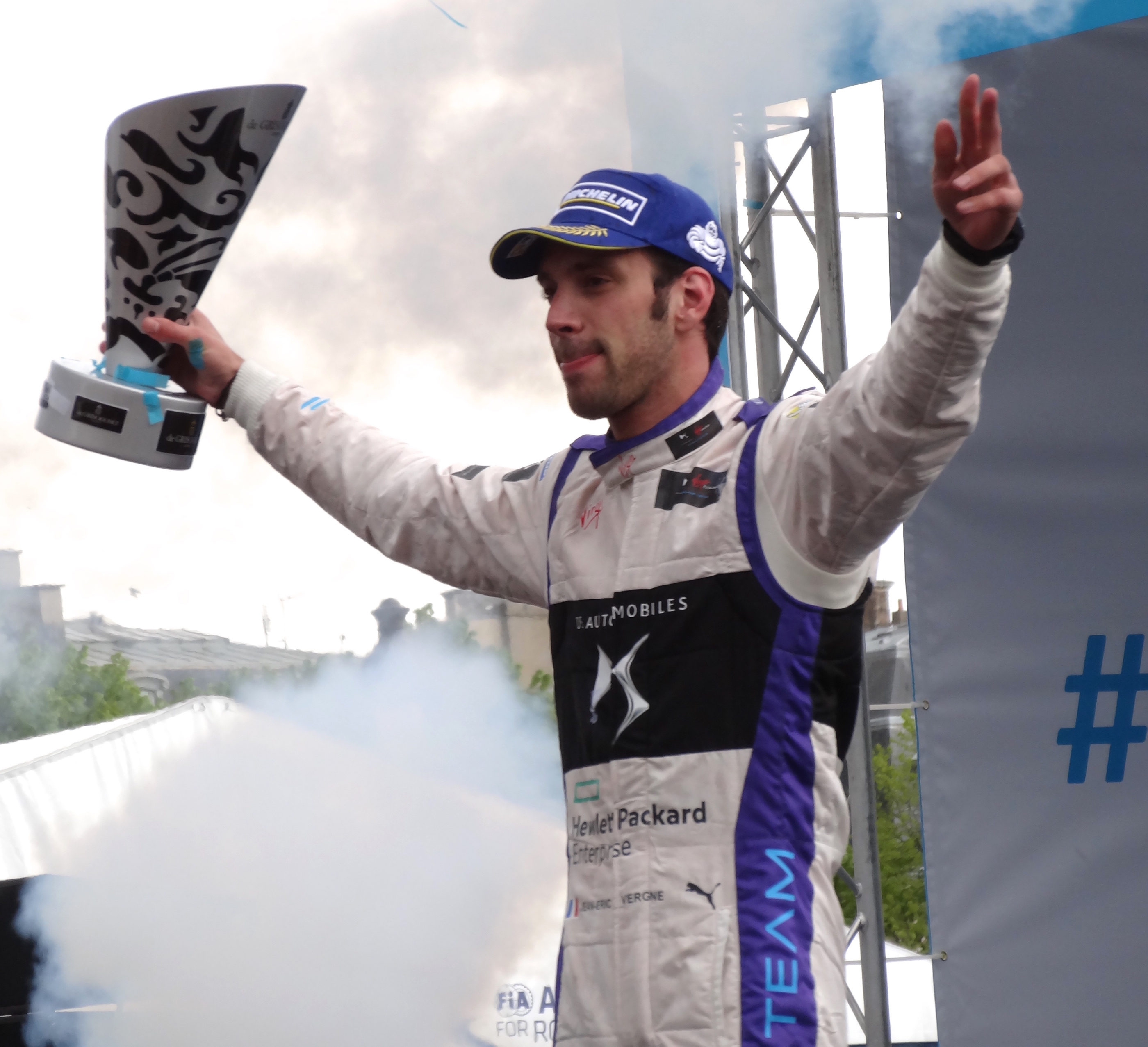
Jean-Éric Vergne finished second after fending off his teammate Bird in the early stages of the event.

As di Grassi began setting consecutive fastest laps to pull away from Vergne and Bird, Ma passed Conway into the first corner on the second lap and he then overtook de Silvestro for 15th. Duval had car setup trouble over the weekend but his day worsened when his gearbox failed on lap six and he stopped on the circuit to retire. The full course yellow procedure was necessitated on the next lap to allow for the recovery of Duval's car by marshals to a safe location. Racing resumed on the eighth lap with di Grassi's lead of 3 1/2 seconds over Vergne lowered to 1 1/2 seconds during the full course yellow period but most drivers retained their respective positions. Frijns had drawn close to Félix da Costa and the two battled each other until Frijns lunged up the inside of Félix da Costa at turn six to gain eighth. The two soon got near to Buemi and Turvey who were duelling over sixth. Initially, Buemi could not pass Turvey but did do so by turning to the outside at turn eight on lap nine. This left Turvey to hold off the challenge presented to him by Frijns and Félix da Costa.

On lap 10, Turvey lost seventh to Frijns. Most of the field found their rhythm in the opening ten laps and lap times began lowering as a result. Vergne and Bird were slowly getting closer to di Grassi but had not brought themselves into a position where they could attack him. At the end of the 15th lap, Félix da Costa braked later than Turvey into turn one for eighth. On the following lap, Buemi passed Sarrazin entering the first corner for fifth. On lap 18, Piquet, tenth, slowed on the straight with a power issue dropping him to the rear of the field. He made an early pit stop to switch into his second car on that lap. Vergne and Bird ran close together throughout the first half of the race. Bird appeared quicker before the pit stops and sought to pass Vergne between turns three and four on lap 22 but they made contact. Bird's front wing and Vergne's right sidepod were damaged in the collision. Prior to this, Buemi passed his teammate Prost for fourth on lap 22 and he closed up to Vergne and Bird before the mandatory pit stops began the lap after.

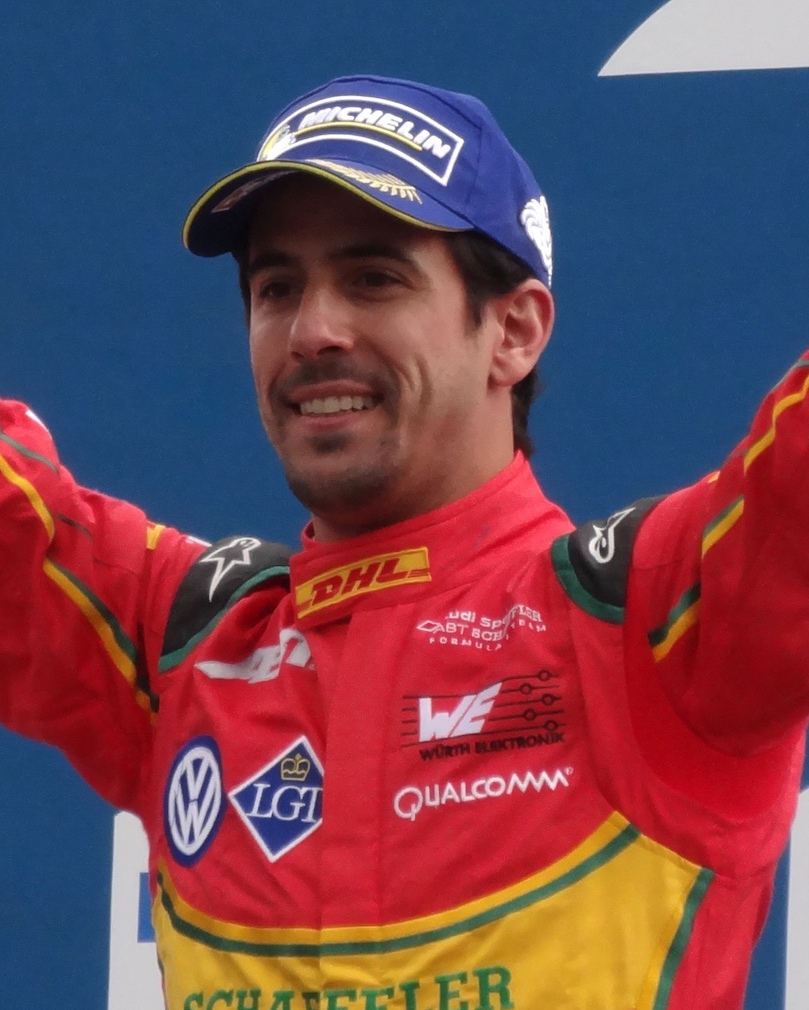
Lucas di Grassi celebrating his second consecutive victory of the season and the fourth of his career on the podium.

Senna, Heidfeld and Abt stayed out to give themselves more usable electrical energy for the end of the race. After the pit stops, di Grassi kept the lead and increased his lead to 6½ seconds by the end of lap 26. The race stagnated over the next seven laps as drivers found it difficult to overtake on the tight track. But the battle for third place between Bird and Buemi gathered pace on lap 33 as Buemi set a series of fastest laps to draw closer to Bird who was still close to his teammate Vergne. Although Buemi was faster, Bird used wider parts of the track to retain third over the next seven laps as Buemi used his FanBoost in an unsuccessful attempt at overtaking him on the back straight during the 34th lap. Heidfeld earned two championship points by setting the race's fastest lap on lap 39 at 1 minute and 2.323 seconds. On lap 40, Bird turned to block Buemi on the inside but he collected oversteer and locked his rear brakes lightly after being caught out by a bump in the road entering turn one. Bird drove onto the turn's run-off area and performed a swift U-turn to return to the track but he fell to sixth as Buemi inherited third.

Approaching the end of the lap, it appeared that di Grassi would win the race comfortably while Buemi was gaining on Vergne for second but the race was disrupted by an accident soon after. Going into the final turn, Ma was pushing hard when he lost control of the rear of his car at the exit of the corner and crashed into the left-hand wall. Ma was unhurt but the crash caused the safety car's deployment to end the race since track workers could not move Ma's car and clear the plethora of debris in time. Because overtaking is not permitted behind the safety car, di Grassi took his second consecutive victory, his third of the season and the fourth of his career. Vergne took his first podium of the season in second and Buemi was third. Off the podium, Prost took fourth ahead of compatriot Sarrazin in fifth. Bird claimed sixth with Frijns and Félix da Costa seventh and eighth. Senna and Abt used their electrical energy advantage to round out the top ten. D'Ambrosio finished eleventh in front of Heidfeld and the NextEV duo of Piquet and Turvey. Conway and de Silvestro were the final classified drivers.

=== Post-race ===
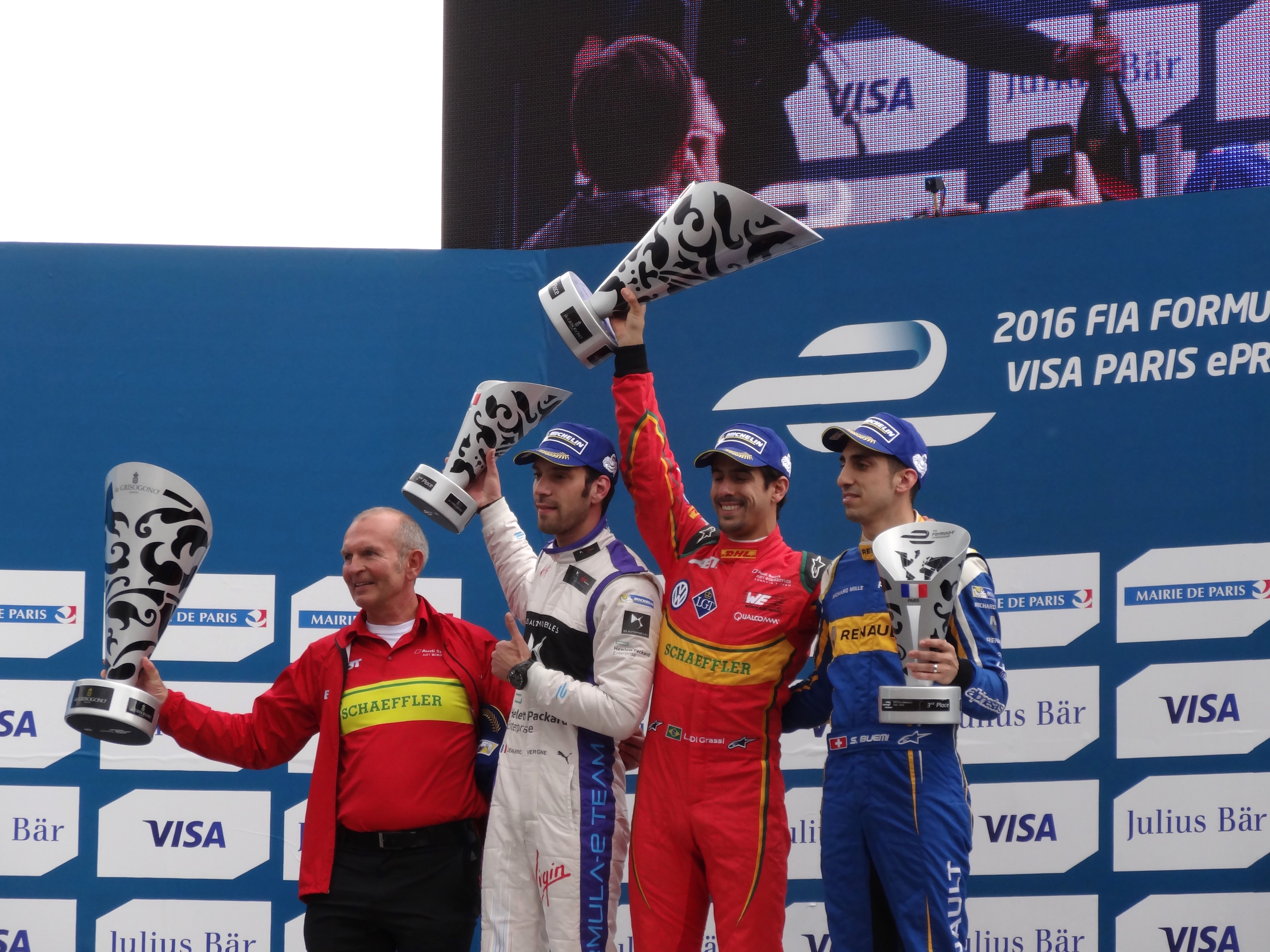
The podium ceremony after the race

The top three drivers appeared on the podium to collect their trophies and spoke to the media in a later press conference. Di Grassi said he felt he had "the most perfect start we had so far" after Bird spun his tyres. He said he glanced his mirrors to prevent Bird from retaking the lead, "To see people all around the track cheering, on the inside of the track and the outside... it's just amazing what was done here today and I hope we race here many more times and in more cities like Paris. This is what Formula E is about." Vergne spoke of his need to end a "negative spiral" by changing his mentality after being unable to match his teammate Bird for overall pace throughout the season and his results had been sub-par, "I never felt really comfortable with the car and the team has helped me a lot. The season has been pretty much a disaster so to finish second in my home race is something I'm quite proud of." Third-placed Buemi said the cold air prevented him from heating his brakes and believed his car was the fastest overall despite being slower over a single lap, "We caught up to others and overtook so it shows that once everything is up to speed it's OK. We just have to work very hard up to the end of the season."

Bird was critical of his teammate Vergne over their battle for second during the first half of race, calling him "a mobile chicane" and believed he was the faster driver, "It was enjoyable if he wasn't my team-mate. This is our home race for DS, we were second and third and he was not massively quicker. We're racing for a big team. We don't want to see two cars finishing in the wall." Vergne responded by expressing his surprise at the contact and Bird's manoeuvres. Virgin team principal Alex Tai admitted after the race that he considered employing team orders to Vergne to allow Bird past but elected not to do so because of Vergne's competitive nature and it was his home ePrix. Prost said that his team needed to achieve a decent result after the problems that affected them in the past few races and affirmed that he would battle his teammate Buemi should it be for the win, "The pace was more or less the same as every race. We’re always fighting for the top five. I think Lucas (di Grassi) and Seb (Buemi) are a bit stronger this year let's hope we can finish the championship like this, score good points in every race."

The consequence of the race extended di Grassi's Drivers' Championship lead over Buemi to 11 points while Bird's sixth-place finish kept him in third position with 82 points. D'Ambrosio remained in fourth with 64 points despite finishing ninth but the large gap he had over the fifth-placed Sarrazin was reduced to six points. In the Teams' Championship, e.Dams-Renault were only able to increase their advantage over Audi Sport ABT by one point while Virgin closed the gap to Dragon in third place to six points. With 65 points, Mahindra maintained fifth place with three rounds left in the season.

=== Race classification ===
Drivers who scored championship points are denoted in bold.

Final race classification
Pos.	No.	Driver	Team	Laps	Time/Retired	Grid	Points
1	**11**	**(Brazil) Lucas di Grassi**	**Audi Sport ABT**	**45**	**52:40.324**	**2**	**25**
2	**25**	**(France) Jean-Éric Vergne**	**Virgin**	**45**	**+0.853**	**3**	**18**
3	**9**	**(Switzerland) Sébastien Buemi**	**e.dams-Renault**	**45**	**+1.616**	**8**	**15**
4	**8**	**(France) Nicolas Prost**	**e.dams-Renault**	**45**	**+2.142**	**5**	**12**
5	**4**	**(France) Stéphane Sarrazin**	**Venturi**	**45**	**+3.044**	**4**	**10**
6	**2**	**(United Kingdom) Sam Bird**	**Virgin**	**45**	**+3.856**	**1**	**8+3^{1}**
7	**27**	**(Netherlands) Robin Frijns**	**Andretti**	**45**	**+5.141**	**6**	**6**
8	**55**	**(Portugal) António Félix da Costa**	**Aguri**	**45**	**+7.000**	**10**	**4**
9	**21**	**(Brazil) Bruno Senna**	**Mahindra**	**45**	**+8.433**	**13**	**2**
10	**66**	**(Germany) Daniel Abt**	**Audi Sport ABT**	**45**	**+9.479**	**14**	**1**
11	7	(Belgium) Jérôme d'Ambrosio	Dragon	45	+10.738	11	
12	**23**	(Germany) **Nick Heidfeld**	**Mahindra**	**45**	**+12.453**	**18**	**2**^{2}
13	88	(United Kingdom) Oliver Turvey	NEXTEV TCR	45	+13.721	7	
14	12	(United Kingdom) Mike Conway	Venturi	45	+14.833	17	
15	28	(Switzerland) Simona de Silvestro	Andretti	45	+16.049	12	
Ret	1	(Brazil) Nelson Piquet Jr.	NEXTEV TCR	39	Out of Energy	9	
Ret	77	(China) Ma Qinghua	Aguri	38	Accident	15	
Ret	6	(France) Loïc Duval	Dragon	4	Gearbox	16	

Notes:

- **^1** – Three points for pole position.
- **^2** – Two points for fastest lap.

== Standings after the race ==
Drivers' Championship standings

+/–	Pos	Driver	Points
	1	(Brazil) Lucas di Grassi	126
	2	(Switzerland) Sébastien Buemi	115
	3	(United Kingdom) Sam Bird	82
	4	(Belgium) Jérôme d'Ambrosio	64
	5	(France) Stéphane Sarrazin	58

Teams' Championship standings

+/–	Pos	Constructor	Points
	1	(France) e.Dams-Renault	165
	2	(Germany) Audi Sport ABT	158
	3	(United States) Dragon	112
	4	(United Kingdom) Virgin	106
	5	(India) Mahindra	65

Previous race: 2016 Long Beach ePrix	FIA Formula E Championship; 2015–16 season	Next race: 2016 Berlin ePrix
Previous race: N/A	Paris ePrix	Next race: 2017 Paris ePrix
