= 2016 Long Beach ePrix =

Open-wheel race

Race 6 of 10 of the 2015–16 Formula E Championship
← Previous race	Next race →
- Layout of the Long Beach Formula E street circuit

Race details
- Date: April 2, 2016
- Official name: 2016 Faraday Future Long Beach ePrix
- Location: Long Beach Street Circuit, Long Beach, California
- Course: Street circuit
- Course length: 2.131 km (1.324 miles)
- Distance: 41 laps, 87.37 km (54,29 miles)
- Weather: Temperatures reaching up to 77 °F (25 °C); wind speeds approaching speeds of 12.7 miles per hour (20.4 km/h)

Pole position
Driver	(United Kingdom) Sam Bird	Virgin
- Time: 57.261

Fastest lap
Driver	(Switzerland) Sébastien Buemi	e.Dams-Renault
- Time: 0:57.938 (lap record) on lap 28

Podium
First	(Brazil) Lucas di Grassi	Audi Sport ABT
Second	(France) Stéphane Sarrazin	Venturi
Third	(Germany) Daniel Abt	Audi Sport ABT

The 2016 Long Beach ePrix (formally the 2016 Faraday Future Long Beach ePrix) was a Formula E electric car race held on April 2, 2016, before a crowd of 17,000 spectators, at the Long Beach Street Circuit, in Long Beach, California. It was the sixth round of the 2015–16 Formula E Championship, and the final Long Beach ePrix. The 41-lap race was won by Lucas di Grassi for Audi Sport ABT from second place. Venturi driver Stéphane Sarrazin finished second, with Di Grassi's teammate Daniel Abt third.

Sam Bird of Virgin began from the pole position after the fastest driver in qualifying Team Aguri's António Félix da Costa was sent to the rear of the grid for an illegal tire pressure. Bird led for the first 11 laps until he was overtaken by di Grassi on the 12h lap. Di Grassi remained at the front of the field through the mandatory pit stop phase to switch into a second car, but his four-second lead was reduced to nothing when the safety car was deployed on lap 35 after NextEV driver Nelson Piquet Jr. crashed. However, di Grassi kept the lead at the rolling restart to take his second victory of the season, and the third of his career.

The result promoted di Grassi to the lead of the Drivers' Championship with 101 points, after previous leader Sébastien Buemi of e.Dams-Renault scored no points in Long Beach. Bird and Jérôme d'Ambrosio for Dragon maintained third and fourth. Sarrazin's second-place finish moved him from eighth to fifth. In the Teams' Championship, Audi Sport ABT reduced e.Dams-Renault's lead to six points, and Dragon fell from second to third with four races left in the season.

== Background ==
The 2016 Long Beach ePrix was confirmed as part of Formula E's 2015–16 schedule in July 2015 by the FIA World Motor Sport Council. It was the sixth of ten scheduled electric car races of the 2015–16 season, and the second edition of the event. It was held at the seven-turn clockwise 1.324 mi (2.131 km) Long Beach Street Circuit in Long Beach, California on April 2, 2016. Construction of the track began on February 16, more than a month before the race. A later Long Beach City Council resolution authorizing the closure of pathways lining the track was adopted in March 2016. There were nine squads entering two participants for a total of 18 drivers each for the ePrix.

Before the race, e.Dams-Renault driver Sébastien Buemi led the Drivers' Championship with 98 points. Audi Sport ABT's Lucas di Grassi was in second position with 76 points, Sam Bird of Virgin was third with 60 points, and Dragon driver Jérôme d'Ambrosio placed fourth with 58 points. With 44 points, d'Ambrosio's teammate Loïc Duval was fifth. In the Teams' Championship, e.Dams-Renault led with 136 points; Dragon were in second place with 102 points, and Audi Sport ABT were a further ten points behind them in third. Virgin were fourth with 66 points, and Mahindra fifth with 49 points.

After he was disqualified from the victory in the preceding Mexico City ePrix because one of his cars was underweight, di Grassi said his objective in Long Beach was to contend for either the podium or victory, "Being disqualified in Mexico was obviously a setback in the fight for the title. My team has dealt precisely with the circumstances and will do everything in its power to prevent this happening ever again. The issue is now closed for me and I’m only looking forward now: six races, a good 150 points – there is plenty to aim for and our ambition remains unbroken. In Mexico we lost together, the next time we’ll win together again." Abt stated beforehand that his objective in Long Beach was to enter the super pole session of qualifying and to contend for a podium place.

== Practice ==
Two practice sessions—both on Saturday morning—were held before the late afternoon race. The first session ran for 45 minutes and the second 30 minutes. A half-hour shakedown on Friday afternoon was led by Duval with a time of 1 minute, 8.016 seconds, followed by his teammate d'Ambrosio and NextEV's Nelson Piquet Jr. Overnight alterations were made to the turn one chicane after drivers raised concerns about its tightness. In the first practice session, held in misty weather and an ambient temperature of 59 °F (15 °C), Buemi lapped fastest with a time of 57.383 seconds. Bird was 0.432 seconds slower in second. The Andretti duo of Simona de Silvestro and Robin Frijns were third and fourth. Salvador Durán was the quicker Aguri driver in fifth, and his teammate António Félix da Costa was seventh; they were separated by Stéphane Sarrazin's Venturi in sixth. Di Grassi, Nico Prost of e.Dams-Renault, and Abt were in eighth to tenth positions. Although the session passed relatively peacefully, Di Grassi ran straight off the dirty track at the turn one chicane, and lightly touched a barrier. Prost and Mahindra's Bruno Senna locked their rear brakes and hit the wall. Venturi's Mike Conway, a two-time winner of the Long Beach Grand Prix, went straight on under braking for turn five, but he avoided striking a wall.

In the shorter second free practice session, held i clear weather, the temperature of the track was rising, and drivers immediately drove onto it to familiarize themselves with setting lap times at 200 kW (270 hp) of power. Buemi set a benchmark time that Virgin's Jean-Éric Vergne bettered. Mahindra's Nick Heidfeld, Sarrazin, Prost and Buemi all held the lead until Abt set the overall fastest lap time of 56.778 seconds with seven minutes remaining. Buemi, Di Grassi, Félix da Costa, Frijns, Bird, Prost, Senna, Sarrazin, and d'Ambrosio made up second to tenth places. As with the first practice session, the second passed without any major incidents, although Duran, Vergne and Frijns (twice) went onto the escape road at turn one; all three executed spin turns to rejoin the track. Heidfeld ran deep going into the same corner, and he swerved to avoid hitting a tire wall. Conway glanced a barrier alongside the circuit on his maximum power lap but he continued with only minor damage.

== Qualifying ==
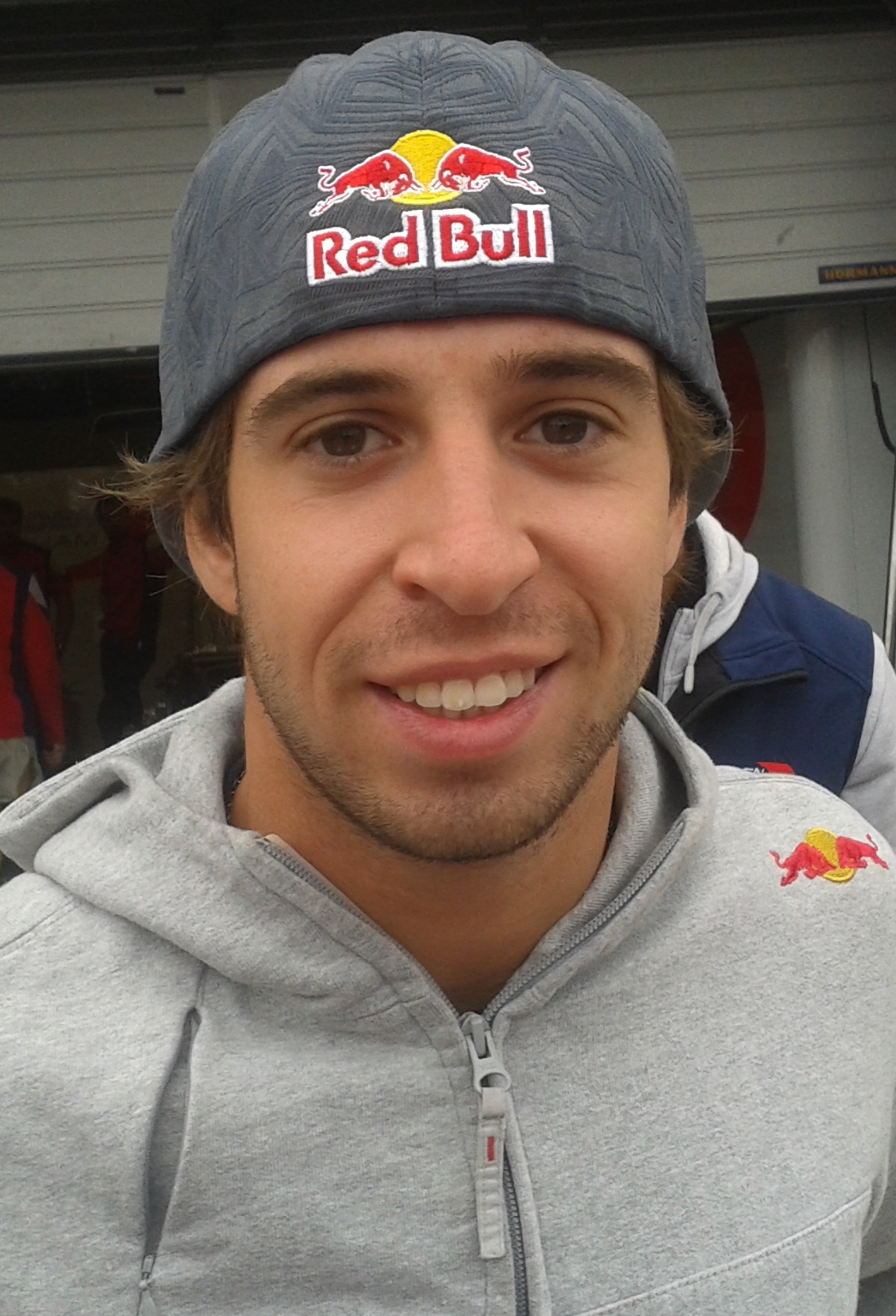
António Félix da Costa (pictured in 2013) set the fastest lap time in super pole but started from the rear of the field due to irregular pressure in his left-rear tire.

Saturday afternoon's qualifying session ran for 60 minutes and was divided into two groups of four cars and another two groups with five vehicles. Each group was determined by a lottery system and was permitted six minutes of on-track activity. All drivers were limited to two timed laps with one at maximum power. The fastest five overall competitors in the four groups participated in a "Super Pole" session with one driver on the track at any time going out in reverse order from fifth to first. Each of the five drivers was limited to one timed lap and the starting order of the ePrix was determined by the competitor's fastest times. The driver and team who recorded the fastest time were awarded three points towards their respective championships.

In the first group, Bird set the fastest lap time of any driver in group qualifying at 56.821 seconds. Frjins was 0.324 seconds slower in second. Buemi eased off his accelerator pedal and lost a plethora of grip entering the first turn, and that meant he could drive into the corner in the method he desired due to him carrying excess oversteer, and he was third-fastest. D'Ambrosio and Oliver Turvey of NextEV were the first group's slowest two drivers. Sarrazin was fastest in group two. Prost had problems with his car's speed despite running without aerodynamic turbulence to slow and he took second with De Silvestro third. Duval was the second group's slowest driver, and overall in group qualifying after he hit the turn five barrier with his car's left-rear wheel during his maximum power lap. Abt used a clean track to go fastest in the third group, followed by Vergne who reported discomfort with his breaks. Piquet and Duran set the slowest two times of group three. It appeared at this point that the five drivers who would progress to super pole had been decided, but Félix da Costa was fastest in the fourth group. Di Grassi followed in second place and Heidfeld was third. Senna and Conway rounded out group four.

At the conclusion of group qualifying, Bird, Félix da Costa, Heidfeld, Di Grassi, and Sarrazin's lap times qualified them for super pole. Félix da Costa was the fourth driver to set a lap time, and he set the fastest overall lap in the third sector, and had the speed for an optimal exit leaving the turn seven hairpin, allowing him to take the first provisional pole position of his career with a lap of 57.178 seconds. Bird made an error at turn one but regained some time by using the kerbs to qualify in second on the grid. DI Grassi had an oversteer that qualified him no better than third. Sarrazin had a lack of grip due to oversteer, meaning he drifted wide on the track, and he was restricted to fourth. Fifth-placed Heidfeld had excess oversteer and rear brake locking. He lost time and glanced the turn seven hairpin barrier. After qualifying, Félix da Costa had all of his lap times deleted because a post-qualifying scrutineering inspection discovered the pressure in his left-rear tire was 0.05-bar (5.0 kPa) below the permitted limit. Piquet received a ten-place grid penalty for changing his electric motor, his second of the season, and series officials ordered him to spend an additional ten seconds at his pit stop. The application of penalties meant Bird began from pole position, ahead of Di Grassi, Sarrazin, Heidfeld, Frijns, Abt, Buemi, Prost, d'Ambrosio, Senna, Vergne, De Silvestro, Turvey, Conway, Duran, Duval, Piquet, and Félix da Costa.

=== Qualifying classification ===
Final qualifying classification
Pos.	No.	Driver	Team	GS	SP	Grid
1	2	(United Kingdom) Sam Bird	Virgin	56.821	57.261	1
2	11	(Brazil) Lucas di Grassi	Audi Sport ABT	57.131	57.270	2
3	4	(France) Stéphane Sarrazin	Venturi	57.136	57.412	3
4	23	(Germany) Nick Heidfeld	Mahindra	57.129	57.825	4
5	27	(Netherlands) Robin Frijns	Andretti	57.145	—N/a	5
6	66	(Germany) Daniel Abt	Audi Sport ABT	57.151	—N/a	6
7	9	(Switzerland) Sébastien Buemi	e.Dams-Renault	57.189	—N/a	7
8	8	(France) Nico Prost	e.Dams-Renault	57.284	—N/a	8
9	7	(Belgium) Jérôme d'Ambrosio	Dragon	57.288	—N/a	9
10	21	(Brazil) Bruno Senna	Mahindra	57.383	—N/a	10
11	25	(France) Jean-Éric Vergne	Virgin	57.496	—N/a	11
12	28	(Switzerland) Simona de Silvestro	Andretti	57.696	—N/a	12
13	88	(United Kingdom) Oliver Turvey	NextEV TCR	57.952	—N/a	13
14	1	(Brazil) Nelson Piquet Jr.	NextEV TCR	58.015	—N/a	17^{1}
15	12	(United Kingdom) Mike Conway	Venturi	58.144	—N/a	14
16	77	(Mexico) Salvador Durán	Team Aguri	58.417	—N/a	15
17	6	(France) Loïc Duval	Dragon	59.049	—N/a	16
18	55	(Portugal) António Félix da Costa	Team Aguri	—	—	18^{2}

Notes:

- ^1 – Nelson Piquet Jr. received a ten-place grid penalty for changing his second electric motor of the season.
- ^2 – António Félix da Costa had all of his qualifying lap times deleted because of an irregular tire pressure.

== Race ==
The race began before a crowd of 17,000 people at 16:00 Pacific Standard Time (UTC−08:00). The weather at the start were dry and clear. The air temperature ranged from 75.4 to 76.5 °F (24.1 to 24.7 °C) and the track temperature was between 80.96 and 83.03 °F (27.20 and 28.35 °C). A special feature of Formula E is the "Fan Boost" feature, an additional 100 kW (130 hp) of power to use in the driver's second car. The three drivers who were allowed to use the boost were determined by a fan vote. For the Long Beach race, Di Grassi, d'Ambrosio, and Heidfeld were handed the extra power. Bird and Di Grassi made equally good getaways but it was Bird who led into the first corner. Although the entire field avoided a major incident on the first lap, Frijns braked heavily for turn one, but he retained control of his car, and fifth from Abt. Félix da Costa made the best start, advancing four positions by the end of lap two. Meanwhile, d'Ambrosio overtook Vergne into turn five. On the third lap, Frijns overtook Heidfeld on the outside for fourth. Heidfeld then locked his rear tyres and ran deep entering turn five, losing further places to Abt, and the e.Dams-Renault duo of Buemi and Prost.

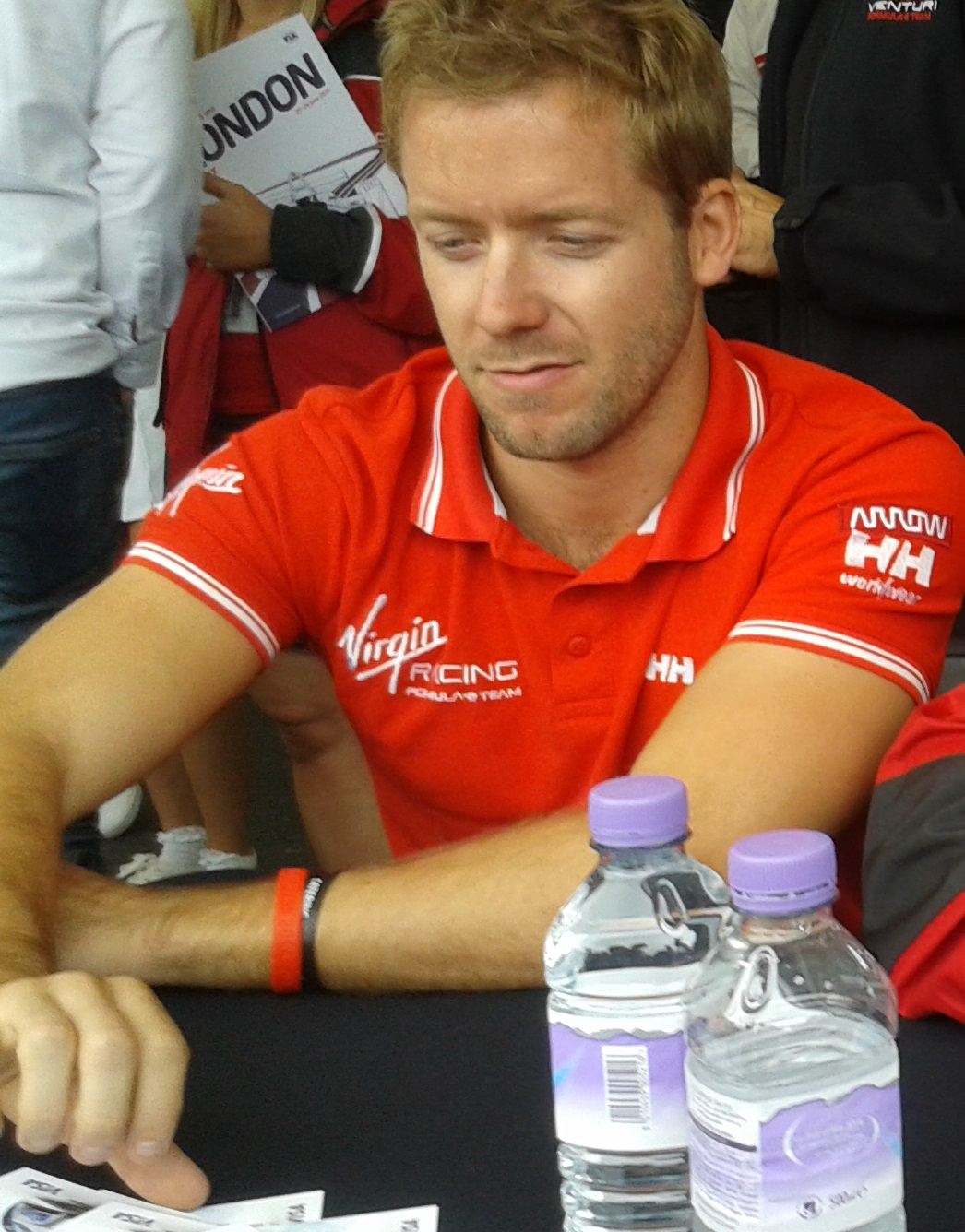
Sam Bird (pictured in 2015) started from the pole position and led the opening eleven laps of the event.

Bird led Di Grassi by half a second as he conserved his electrical energy usage in the early part of the race. Turvey was passed by Félix da Costa for the 13th position. Buemi set what was at that point, the fastest lap of the race on lap seven, as he was moved closer to Abt. At the conclusion of the following lap, Buemi out-braked Abt around the inside at the turn seven hairpin for fifth position. Bird blocked Di Grassi from passing him for the lead on the eleventh lap. On lap twelve, Buemi sought to overtake Frijns but he missed his braking point and momentarily mounted the rear of Frijns' car at the turn seven hairpin. Frijns' rear wing was removed, while Buemi went airborne, and lost his front wing's left-hand section. Frijns was sent around by the impact. Yellow flags were waved at the turn seven hairpin to caution drivers about debris there. Frijns fell to ninth, while Abt and Prost advanced to fourth and fifth.

That lap, Di Grassi caught Bird off guard, and got a better run to pass him on the inside into turn five to take the lead. Both narrowly avoided running over Buemi's section of nose cone from the earlier incident. Frijns and Buemi were shown the black flag with an orange disc by marshals on lap 15, mandating they enter the pit lane and repair their cars, which they did on lap 16. Both elected to switch into their second cars, but their expectations of finishing were improbable. Series officials later deemed Buemi responsible for causing the accident with Frijns and imposed a drive-through penalty on him. Vergne and Duval made their pit stops to switch into a second car to end the 20th lap. The majority of the field, apart from Buemi, Frijns, and the Mahindras of Heidfeld and Senna, entered the pit lane on the next lap. Heidfeld led lap 22, as he and his teammate Senna elongated their electrical energy usage to gain positions.

After the pit stops, Di Grassi returned to the lead, with Bird in second, and Sarrazin close behind the duo in third. Prost was issued a drive-through penalty because his pit stop was a tenth of a second under the mandated minimum time of 67 seconds. Bird's mid-corner speed allowed him to stay close to Di Grassi's low-drag car. But, during his out-lap on lap 23, he locked his cold brakes into turn five, and lightly touched the exit tire barrier with the front of his car. Bird extricated himself from the barrier, and he rejoined behind Senna in seventh place. He had bodywork damage to his car, but his chance of winning the race was over. Bird caught Senna quickly but the latter fended off his passing manoeuvres despite a rear brake bias problem. On lap 27, Félix da Costa overtook Vergne for ninth. The following lap, Buemi set the race's fastest lap of 57.938 seconds, earning him two championship points. Prost took his drive-through penalty at the conclusion of the 30th lap, dropping him from fourth to fourteenth.

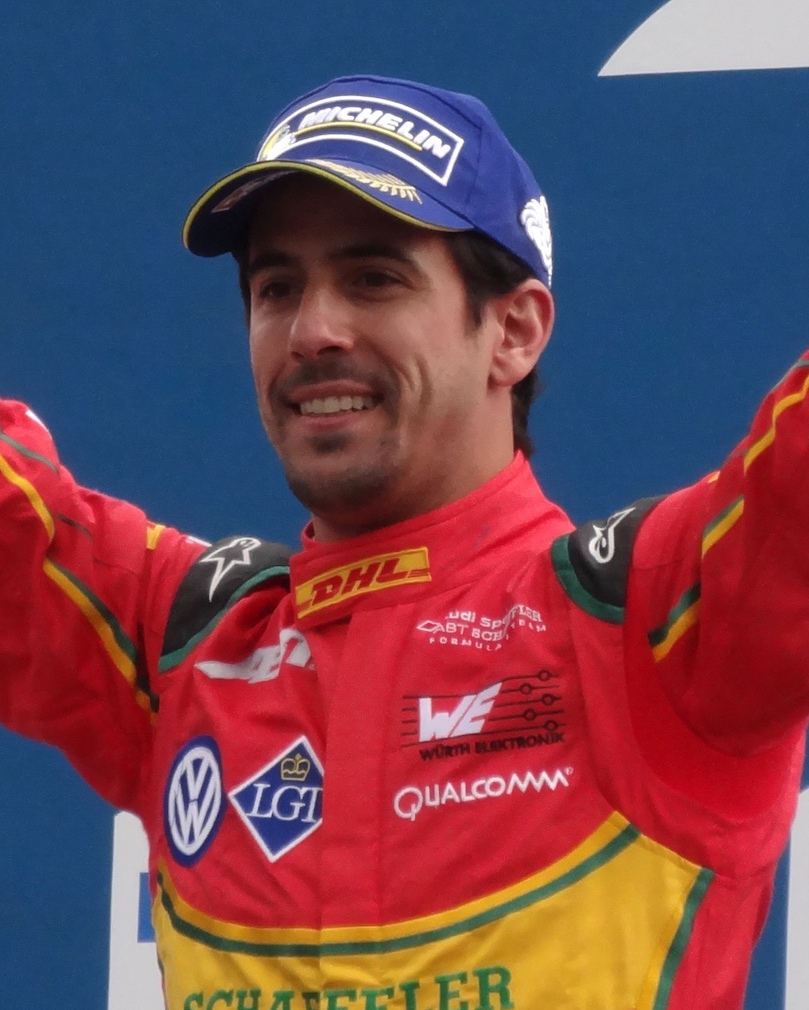
Lucas di Grassi (pictured at the following 2016 Paris ePrix) led a race-high 29 laps to secure his third career victory.

On lap 33, Duran was imposed a drive-through penalty for exceeding the maximum amount of permitted electrical energy of 170 kW (230 hp) in his first car during the first half of the race. On the next lap, Piquet was seeking to set the fastest lap, but carried excess speed on the entry to the chicane, launching the left-hand side of his car airborne by clambering over the kerbs. He crashed into an outside barrier at the exit of the pit lane that rejoined the track after turn two. Since he could not drive because his front wing had folded under the car, and was in a dangerous position, the safety car was deployed on lap 35 to close the field up, and to allow Piquet's vehicle to be recovered, reducing Di Grassi's four-second lead to nothing. In the meantime, Félix da Costa entered the pit lane to retire from eighth with a broken suspension wishbone. The safety car was withdrawn at the conclusion of lap 38, and racing resumed without incident as Di Grassi led Sarrazin and Abt. Heidfeld immediately used his FanBoost to try and overtake Abt but was unsuccessful.

Sarrazin had three percent less usable electrical energy than Di Grassi who marginally pulled away from him. He then locked his rear brakes at the turn seven hairpin while under pressure by Abt for second. No positional changes occurred within the top six in the final three laps, and Di Grassi crossed the start/finish line after 41 laps to take his second victory of the season, and the third of his career. Sarrazin claimed his first career podium in second, and Abt took third. Off the podium, Heidfeld could not pass Abt and he took fourth. His teammate Senna was fifth, and he was followed by Bird in the higher-placed of the two Virgins in sixth. The two Dragon cars of d'Ambrosio and Duval placed seventh and eighth. De Silvestro finished in ninth to become the first woman to score points in Formula E. Conway rounded out the top ten finishers. The final classified drivers were Prost, Turvey, Vergne, Duran, Frijns, and Buemi. There were three lead changes amongst three different drivers during the race. Di Grassi led twice for a total of 29 laps, more than any other driver.

=== Post-race ===
The top three drivers appeared on the podium to collect their trophies and spoke to the media in a later press conference. Di Grassi said of his victory, "I'm very happy to show that if you keep your focus, keep up your work, good results come. From the outside races always look comfortable, this is a tricky track, it's very easy to do mistakes. It's an extremely difficult car to drive on the edge so we had no comfort in winning the race. We just had to focus on making no mistakes." Sarrazin said he was happy with the pace of both of his cars allowing him to race at the front of the field and finish second, "We have been so close to a win so many times since the beginning of the Formula-E series. Today is a great relief, and a great joy – everything really came together for us today." Third-placed Abt said he was disappointed not to qualify in a strong position, "In the race I tried to stay cool while others around were making a lot of mistakes, and that helped me a lot. This result was so important for the team and our first double podium is for them."

Félix da Costa bemoaned the lost opportunity to win after his qualifying times were deleted due to an irregular tire pressure, saying, "Finally I had the chance to compete for a race clean and it got taken away. The team is going through a big transition. We're a new team really and I think only this weekend we got the people that will be with the team next year. At the moment all these people coming in and out, mistakes happen. I don't believe in bad luck; the tyre pressure was down because we pushed it to the limit. I can appreciate all the hard work, that we win together and lose together, but it's very painful." Bird stated his belief he was responsible for the error that lost him a podium result, "It was fortunate, really, normally when you get stuck in a tyre wall you don't finish the race, so fortunate in one respect but gutted I didn't get the second or the win. Just a shame we didn't capitalise at one of the circuits we’re good at." De Silvestro had a best result of eleventh before the Long Beach race and commented on her career-best finish of ninth, "We’ve been so close so many times and we’ve never got them. So it's a great step forward. The weekend was good, pretty happy to have it happen in Long Beach too because most of my racing has happened here in the U.S. so it feels like home. You always want to do well in front of your home crowd."

The result of the race moved Di Grassi into the lead of the Drivers' Championship with 101 points. Buemi scored no points in Long Beach and fell to second, one point behind Di Grassi. Bird maintained third place with 71 points, and d'Ambrosio kept fourth with seven less points. With 48 points, Sarrazin's second-place finish moved him to fifth. e.Dams-Renault kept the lead of the Teams' Championship with 138 points, but Audi Sport ABT moved them from third to second, and lowered e.Dams' advantage to six points. Dragon were third with 112 points while Virgin, with 77 points, continued to lead Mahindra on 61 points with four races left in the season. The Long Beach ePrix was dropped from the Formula E calendar in July 2016 because race organizers and the series could not agree on a financial agreement to continue the event.

=== Race classification ===
Drivers who scored championship points are denoted in bold.

Final race classification
Pos.	No.	Driver	Team	Laps	Time/Retired	Grid	Points
1	**11**	**(Brazil) Lucas di Grassi**	**Audi Sport ABT**	**41**	**45:11.582**	**2**	25
2	**4**	**(France) Stéphane Sarrazin**	**Venturi**	**41**	**+0.787**	**3**	18
3	**66**	**(Germany) Daniel Abt**	**Audi Sport ABT**	**41**	**+1.685**	**6**	15
4	**23**	**(Germany) Nick Heidfeld**	**Mahindra**	**41**	**+2.343**	**4**	12
5	**21**	**(Brazil) Bruno Senna**	**Mahindra**	**41**	**+4.968**	**10**	10
6	**2**	**(United Kingdom) Sam Bird**	**Virgin**	**41**	**+5.229**	**1**	8+3^{3}
7	**7**	**(Belgium) Jérôme d'Ambrosio**	**Dragon**	**41**	**+6.735**	**9**	6
8	**6**	**(France) Loïc Duval**	**Dragon**	**41**	**+8.057**	**17**	4
9	**28**	**(Switzerland) Simona de Silvestro**	**Andretti**	**41**	**+10.505**	**12**	2
10	**12**	**(United Kingdom) Mike Conway**	**Venturi**	**41**	**+10.900**	**15**	1
11	8	(France) Nico Prost	e.Dams-Renault	41	+11.205	8	
12	88	(United Kingdom) Oliver Turvey	NextEV TCR	41	+17.417	13	
13	25	(France) Jean-Éric Vergne	Virgin	40	+1 lap	11	
14	77	(Mexico) Salvador Durán	Team Aguri	40	+1 lap	16	
15	27	(Netherlands) Robin Frijns	Andretti	40	+1 lap	5	
16	**9**	**(Switzerland) Sébastien Buemi**	**e.Dams-Renault**	**38**	**+3 laps**	**7**	2^{4}
Ret	55	(Portugal) António Félix da Costa	Team Aguri	33	Suspension	18	
Ret	1	(Brazil) Nelson Piquet Jr.	NextEV TCR	32	Accident	14	

Notes:

- **^3** – Three points for pole position.
- **^4** – Two points for fastest lap.

== Standings after the race ==
Drivers' Championship standings

+/–	Pos	Driver	Points
1	1	(Brazil) Lucas di Grassi	101
1	2	(Switzerland) Sébastien Buemi	100
	3	(United Kingdom) Sam Bird	71
	4	(Belgium) Jérôme d'Ambrosio	64
3	5	(France) Stéphane Sarrazin	48

Teams' Championship standings

+/–	Pos	Constructor	Points
	1	(France) e.Dams-Renault	138
1	2	(Germany) Audi Sport ABT	132
1	3	(United States) Dragon	112
	4	(United Kingdom) Virgin-Citroën	77
	5	(India) Mahindra	61

- Notes: Only the top five positions are included for both sets of standings.

Previous race: 2016 Mexico City ePrix	FIA Formula E Championship; 2015–16 season	Next race: 2016 Paris ePrix
Previous race: 2015 Long Beach ePrix	Long Beach ePrix	Next race: None
