= Buenos Aires ePrix =

- Puerto Madero Street Circuit (2015–2017)

Race information
- Number of times held: 3
- First held: 2015
- Last held: 2017
- Circuit length: 2.480 km (1.541 miles)
- Race length: 91.72 km (56.98 miles)
- Laps: 37

Last race (2017)

Pole position
- (Brazil) Lucas di Grassi; Audi Sport ABT; 1:09.404

Podium
- 1. (Switzerland) S. Buemi; e.Dams-Renault; 45:45.623; 2. (France) J-É. Vergne; Techeetah-Renault; +2.996; 3. (Brazil) L. di Grassi; Audi Sport ABT; +6.921

Fastest lap
- (Sweden) Felix Rosenqvist; Mahindra; 1:09.467

The Buenos Aires ePrix was an annual race of the single-seater, electrically powered Formula E championship, held in Buenos Aires, Argentina. It was first raced in the 2014–15 season.

== Circuit ==
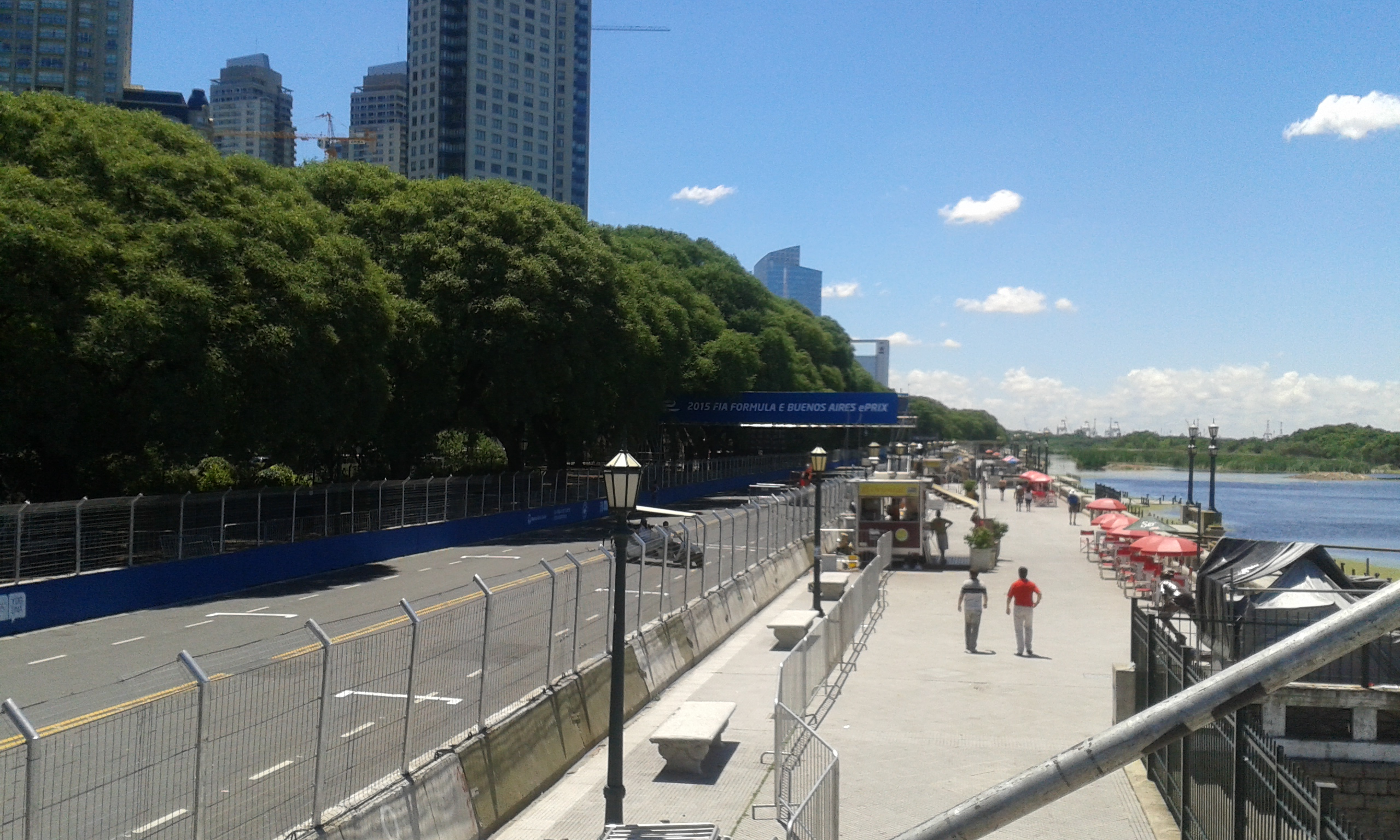
Puerto Madero Street Circuit, previous to the 2015 Buenos Aires ePrix.

The Buenos Aires ePrix was held on the Puerto Madero Street Circuit, a street circuit located in the Puerto Madero district of Buenos Aires. It was used for the first time on 10 January 2015 during the fourth ePrix of Formula E. The track was 2.480 km (1.541 mi) in length and featured 12 turns. The circuit was designed by Santiago García Remohí.

== Results ==
Edition	Track	Winner	Second	Third	Pole position	Fastest lap	Ref
2015	Puerto Madero	(Portugal) António Félix da Costa; Amlin Aguri	(France) Nico Prost e.dams Renault	(Brazil) Nelson Piquet Jr. China Racing	(Switzerland) Sébastien Buemi e.dams Renault	(United Kingdom) Sam Bird; Virgin Racing	
2016	Puerto Madero	(United Kingdom) Sam Bird; DS Virgin Racing	(Switzerland) Sébastien Buemi; Renault e.dams	(Brazil) Lucas di Grassi; ABT Schaeffler Audi Sport	(United Kingdom) Sam Bird; DS Virgin Racing	(Belgium) Jérôme d'Ambrosio; Dragon Racing	
2017	Puerto Madero	(Switzerland) Sébastien Buemi; Renault e.dams	(France) Jean-Éric Vergne; Techeetah	(Brazil) Lucas di Grassi; ABT Schaeffler Audi Sport	(Brazil) Lucas di Grassi; ABT Schaeffler Audi Sport	(Sweden) Felix Rosenqvist; Mahindra Racing	
