= 2016 Buenos Aires ePrix =

Race 4 of 10 of the 2015–16 Formula E season
← Previous race	Next race →
- Layout of the Puerto Madero Street Circuit

Race details
- Date: 6 February 2016
- Official name: 2016 FIA Formula E Buenos Aires ePrix
- Location: Puerto Madero Street Circuit, Buenos Aires, Argentina
- Course: Street circuit
- Course length: 2.479 km (1.54 miles)
- Distance: 35 laps, 86.77 km (53.91 miles)

Pole position
Driver	(United Kingdom) Sam Bird	DS Virgin Racing
- Time: 1:09.420

Fastest lap
Driver	(Belgium) Jérôme d'Ambrosio	Dragon Racing
- Time: 1:10.285

Podium
First	(United Kingdom) Sam Bird	DS Virgin Racing
Second	(Switzerland) Sébastien Buemi	Renault e.Dams
Third	(Brazil) Lucas di Grassi	ABT Schaeffler Audi Sport

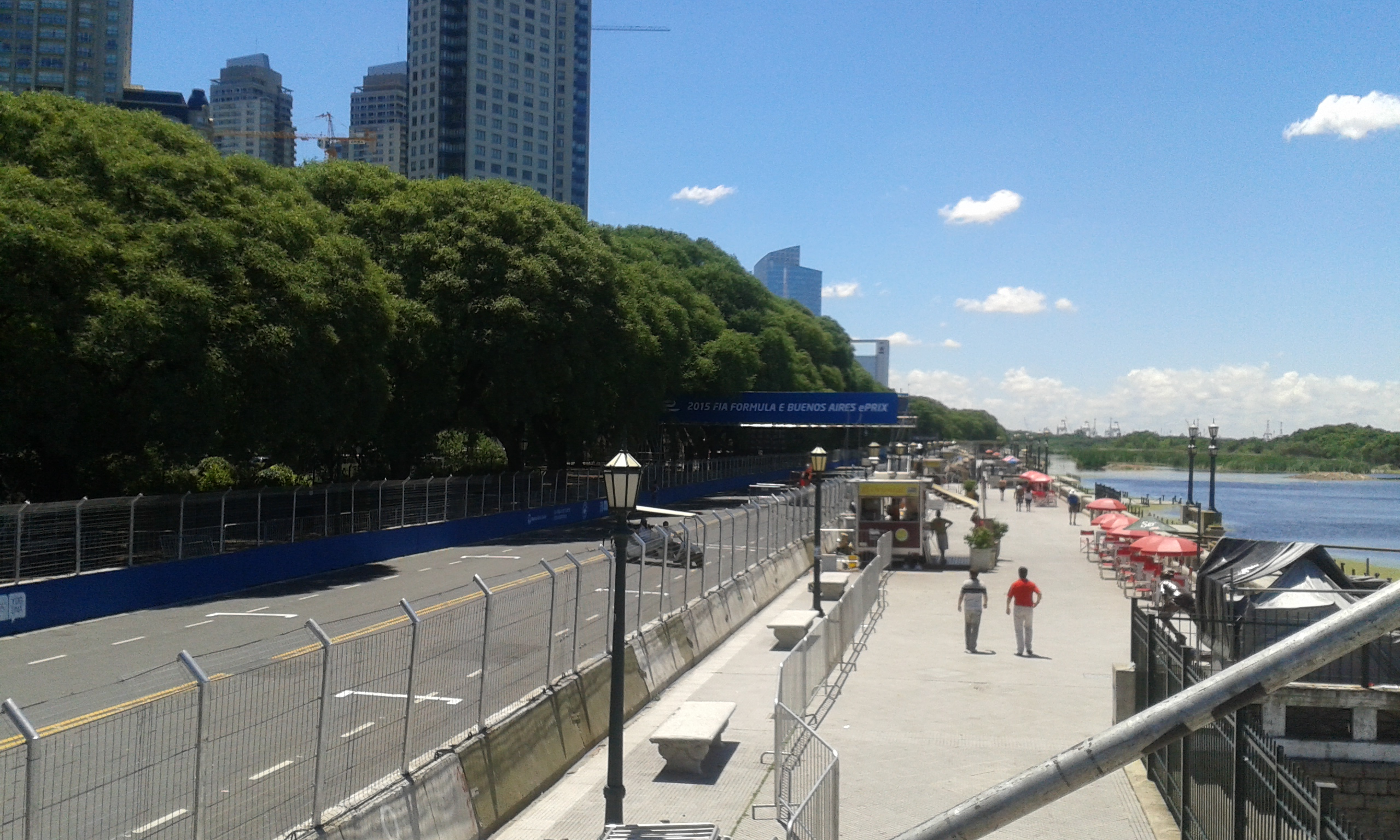
Puerto Madero Street Circuit, previous to the 2015 Buenos Aires ePrix.

The 2016 Buenos Aires ePrix was a Formula E motor race held on 6 February 2016 at the Puerto Madero Street Circuit in Puerto Madero, Buenos Aires, Argentina. It was the fourth championship race of the 2015–16 Formula E season, the single-seater, electrically powered racing car series' second season. It was also the second Buenos Aires ePrix and the 15th Formula E race overall. Sam Bird won the race for his first win of the season.

== Report ==
=== Background ===
Mike Conway replaced Jacques Villeneuve who parted ways with the Venturi team.

Salvador Durán re-joined Team Aguri for the rest of the season after they split with Nathanaël Berthon. The Mexican driver already competed in nine rounds of the first season for Team Aguri.

FanBoost was awarded to Jean-Éric Vergne, Sam Bird and Lucas di Grassi.

== Classifications ==
=== Qualifying ===
Pos.	No.	Driver	Team	Time	Gap	Grid
1	4	(France) Stéphane Sarrazin	Venturi	1:09.236		4^{1}
2	55	(Portugal) António Félix da Costa	Team Aguri	1:09.381	+0.145	3^{1}
3	8	(France) Nicolas Prost	Renault e.Dams	1:09.473	+0.237	2^{1}
4	2	(United Kingdom) Sam Bird	DS Virgin Racing	1:09.474	+0.238	1^{1}
5	12	(United Kingdom) Mike Conway	Venturi	1:09.602	+0.366	5^{1}
6	27	(Netherlands) Robin Frijns	Amlin Andretti	1:09.616	+0.380	6
7	11	(Brazil) Lucas di Grassi	ABT Schaeffler Audi Sport	1:09.675	+0.441	7
8	66	(Germany) Daniel Abt	ABT Schaeffler Audi Sport	1:09.814	+0.578	8
9	1	(Brazil) Nelson Piquet Jr.	NEXTEV TCR	1:09.931	+0.695	9
10	7	(Belgium) Jérôme d'Ambrosio	Dragon Racing	1:10.067	+0.831	10
11	88	(United Kingdom) Oliver Turvey	NEXTEV TCR	1:10.126	+0.890	11
12	6	(France) Loïc Duval	Dragon Racing	1:10.130	+0.894	12
13	23	(Germany) Nick Heidfeld	Mahindra Racing	1:10.321	+1.085	13
14	28	(Switzerland) Simona de Silvestro	Amlin Andretti	1:10.446	+1.210	14
15	25	(France) Jean-Éric Vergne	DS Virgin Racing	1:09.581	+1.345	15
16	21	(Brazil) Bruno Senna	Mahindra Racing	1:11.306	+2.070	16
17	77	(Mexico) Salvador Durán	Team Aguri	1:13.256	+4.020	17
18	9	(Switzerland) Sébastien Buemi	Renault e.Dams	1:19.421	+10.185	18

Notes:

- ^1 – Final grid position of top five qualifiers determined by Super Pole shootout.

=== Super Pole ===
Pos.	No.	Driver	Team	Time	Gap	Grid
1	2	(United Kingdom) Sam Bird	DS Virgin Racing	1:09.420		1
2	8	(France) Nicolas Prost	Renault e.Dams	1:09.751	+0.331	2
3	55	(Portugal) António Félix da Costa	Team Aguri	1:09.761	+0.341	3
4	4	(France) Stéphane Sarrazin	Venturi	1:10.298	+0.878	4
5	12	(United Kingdom) Mike Conway	Venturi	1:12.391	+2.971	5

=== Race ===
Pos.	No.	Driver	Team	Laps	Time/Retired	Grid	Points
1	2	(United Kingdom) Sam Bird	DS Virgin Racing	35	45:28.385	1	25+3^{2}
2	9	(Switzerland) Sébastien Buemi	Renault e.Dams	35	+0.716	18	18
3	11	(Brazil) Lucas di Grassi	ABT Schaeffler Audi Sport	35	+7.525	7	15
4	4	(France) Stéphane Sarrazin	Venturi	35	+9.415	4	12
5	8	(France) Nicolas Prost	Renault e.dams	35	+11.316	2	10
6	6	(France) Loïc Duval	Dragon Racing	35	+15.660	12	8
7	23	(Germany) Nick Heidfeld	Mahindra Racing	35	+16.444	13	6
8	27	(Netherlands) Robin Frijns	Amlin Andretti	35	+18.685	6	4
9	88	(United Kingdom) Oliver Turvey	NEXTEV TCR	35	+22.007	11	2
10	21	(Brazil) Bruno Senna	Mahindra Racing	35	+22.456	16	1
11	25	(France) Jean-Éric Vergne	DS Virgin Racing	35	+24.482	15	
12	1	(Brazil) Nelson Piquet Jr.	NEXTEV TCR	35	+24.641	9	
13	66	(Germany) Daniel Abt	ABT Schaeffler Audi Sport	35	+27.998	8	
14	28	(Switzerland) Simona de Silvestro	Amlin Andretti	35	+36.171	14	
15	12	(United Kingdom) Mike Conway	Venturi	35	+39.581	5	
16	7	(Belgium) Jérôme d'Ambrosio	Dragon Racing	34	+1 lap	10	2^{3}
Ret	55	(Portugal) António Félix da Costa	Team Aguri	17	Software	3	
Ret	77	(Mexico) Salvador Durán	Team Aguri	14	Brakes	17	

Notes:

- ^2 – Three points for pole position.
- ^3 – Two points for fastest lap.

== Standings after the race ==
Drivers' Championship standings

Pos	Driver	Points
1	(Switzerland) Sébastien Buemi	80
2	(Brazil) Lucas di Grassi	76
3	(United Kingdom) Sam Bird	52
4	(France) Loïc Duval	32
5	(Belgium) Jérôme d'Ambrosio	30

Teams' Championship standings

Pos	Constructor	Points
1	(France) Renault e.Dams	101
2	(Germany) ABT Schaeffler Audi Sport	86
3	(United States) Dragon Racing	62
4	(United Kingdom) DS Virgin Racing	58
5	(India) Mahindra Racing	34

- Notes: Only the top five positions are included for both sets of standings.

Previous race: 2015 Punta del Este ePrix	FIA Formula E Championship; 2015–16 season	Next race: 2016 Mexico City ePrix
Previous race: 2015 Buenos Aires ePrix	Buenos Aires ePrix	Next race: 2017 Buenos Aires ePrix
