= 2017 Buenos Aires ePrix =

Race 3 of 12 of the 2016–17 Formula E Championship
← Previous race	Next race →
- Layout of the Puerto Madero Street Circuit

Race details
- Date: 18 February 2017
- Official name: 2017 FIA Formula E Buenos Aires ePrix
- Location: Puerto Madero Street Circuit, Puerto Madero, Buenos Aires, Argentina
- Course: Street circuit
- Course length: 2.480 km (1.54 miles)
- Distance: 37 laps, 91.72 km (56.98 miles)
- Weather: Sunny; Air: 29.0 to 29.7 °C (84.2 to 85.5 °F), Track: 26 °C (79 °F)
- Attendance: 21,000

Pole position
Driver	(Brazil) Lucas di Grassi	Audi Sport ABT
- Time: 1:09.404

Fastest lap
Driver	(Sweden) Felix Rosenqvist	Mahindra
- Time: 1:09.467 (lap record) on lap 31

Podium
First	(Switzerland) Sébastien Buemi	e.Dams-Renault
Second	(France) Jean-Éric Vergne	Techeetah-Renault
Third	(Brazil) Lucas di Grassi	Audi Sport ABT

The 2017 Buenos Aires ePrix (formally the 2017 FIA Formula E Buenos Aires ePrix) was a Formula E electric motor race held on 18 February 2017 at the Puerto Madero Street Circuit in Puerto Madero, Buenos Aires, Argentina in front of a crowd of 21,000 people. It was the third round of the 2016–17 Formula E Championship and the third running of the event. The 37-lap race was won by e.Dams-Renault driver Sébastien Buemi after starting from third position. Techeetah's Jean-Éric Vergne finished second and Audi Sport ABT driver Lucas di Grassi was third.

Di Grassi won the pole position by recording the fastest lap in qualifying and led the first lap. The race was neutralised on the same lap because of Adam Carroll's stalled car and when the race restarted one lap later Vergne challenged di Grassi for the lead and passed him on lap three. Di Grassi lost second place to Buemi soon after and the latter took the lead by overtaking Vergne on the sixth lap. Buemi kept the lead after the mandatory pit stops to switch into his second car but despite having trouble with braking in a straight line Buemi remained in first place for the rest of the race to win. There were four lead changes among four different drivers during the course of the race.

It was Buemi's third consecutive victory of the season, the ninth of his career, and he became the first driver in Formula E history to win three successive races. The result increased Buemi's Drivers' Championship advantage over di Grassi to 29 points. Buemi's teammate Nico Prost maintained third position, while Vergne's strong finish moved him to fourth place. e.Dams-Renault extended their Teams' Championship advantage over Audi Sport ABT to 51 points and were a further 23 ahead of Mahindra with nine races left in the season.

== Background ==
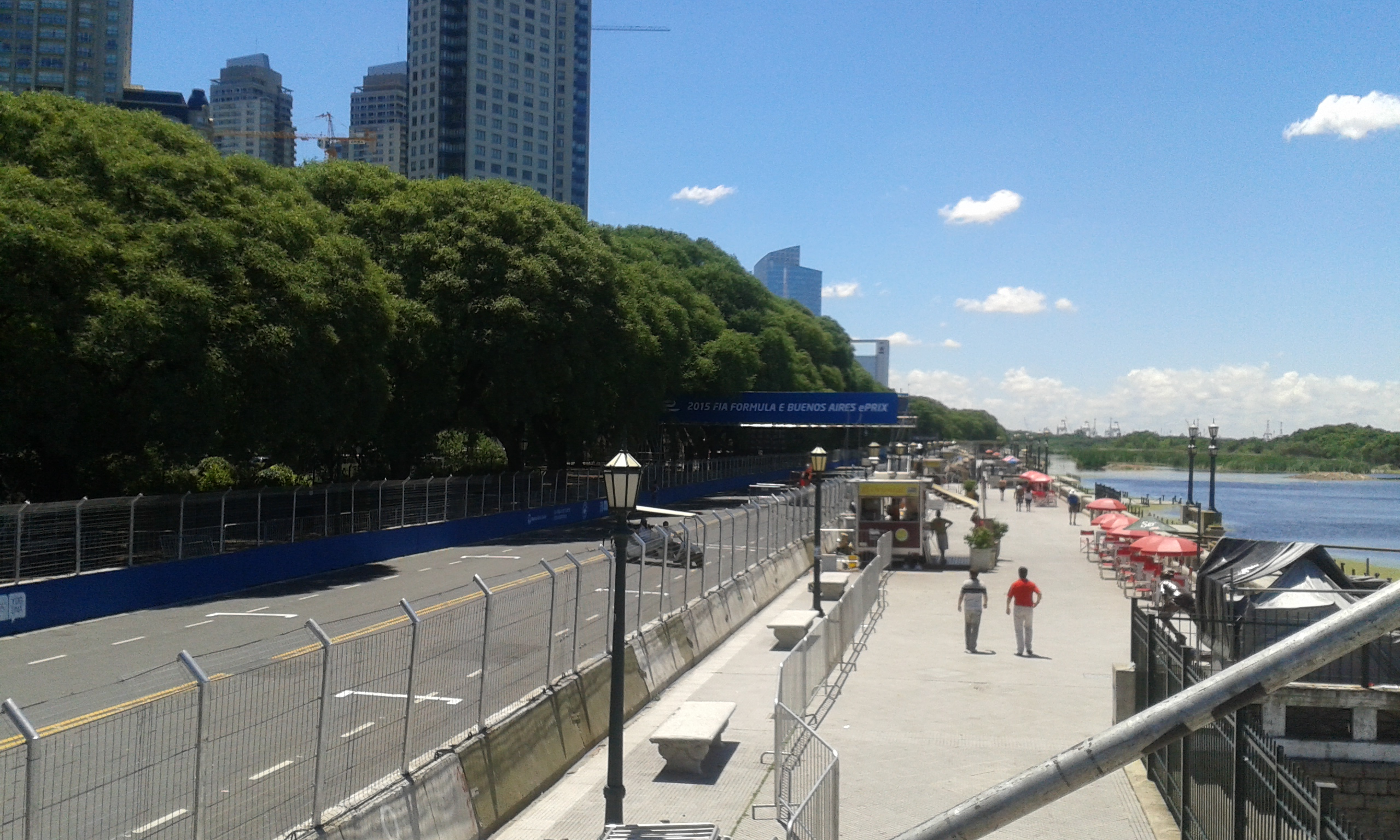
Puerto Madero Street Circuit, where the race was held.

The Buenos Aires ePrix was confirmed as part of Formula E's 2016–17 schedule in September 2016 by the FIA World Motor Sport Council. It was the third of twelve single-seater electric car races of the 2016–17 Championship, the third running of the event, and was held on 18 February 2017 at the 12-turn 2.480 km (1.541 mi) anti-clockwise Puerto Madero Street Circuit in Puerto Madero. It was announced in November 2016 the race would be the last at the Puterto Madero Street Circuit; the change came about due to redevelopment in the Puterto Madero area. There were 20 drivers entered by 10 different teams for the event.

Before the race e.Dams-Renault driver Sébastien Buemi led the Drivers' Championship with 50 points, 22 ahead of Lucas di Grassi in second and a further four in front of third-placed Nico Prost. Felix Rosenqvist was fourth on 19 points, and Sam Bird rounded out the top five with 18 points. e.Dams-Renault led the Teams' Championship with 74 points; Audi Sport ABT and Mahindra were tied for second position with 36 points each. Virgin were fourth with 19 points, one point ahead of fifth-placed Andretti.

Buemi had yet to win in Buenos Aires after losing the 2015 victory due to a crash late on and qualified at the back in the 2016 race where he recovered to finish second. He stated his hope to qualify well and win the race: "I’ve always been very competitive in Buenos Aires, however I’ve never translated it into the win, so I’m hoping to make that happen this year." Di Grassi revealed his team's objective was to win in Buenos Aires and accumulate as many points as possible. He believed the circuit would suit his car following development to it over the hiatus. After being unable to win in Marrakesh because of various issues, Rosenqvist revealed he gathered his team members for a meeting to discuss improvements and set himself the objective of winning for the first time in Formula E and prepared for the race in the Mahindra simulator. Bird, the 2016 winner, said Buemi was the one to watch out for and hoped to avoid the sub-par results from the season's last two races. Oliver Turvey of NextEV felt in 2016, he quickly gained confidence driving the track and was optimistic about continuing his team's development and expected to challenge for a podium or race victory.

== Practice ==
Two practice sessions—both on Saturday morning—were held before the Saturday late afternoon race. The first session ran for 45 minutes and the second for 30 minutes. A 30-minute shakedown session was held on Friday afternoon before the practice sessions and had António Félix da Costa record the fastest time of 1 minute, 18.1 seconds, ahead of Rosenqvist in second and Nick Heidfeld Heidfeld third. Both practice sessions took place in dry weather. José María López 200 kW (270 hp) of power to set the first session's fastest lap at 1 minute, 9.431 seconds, 0.628 seconds quicker than Techeetah's Jean-Éric Vergne in second. Mitch Evans of Jaguar, Buemi, Bird, Rosenqvist, Prost, di Grassi, Turvey and Nelson Piquet Jr. (NextEV) rounded out the session's top ten drivers. The session was twice stopped when Félix da Costa lost control of his car's rear and hit the turn six barrier. Félix da Costa's damaged car was transported to his garage for repairs and drove his second vehicle. He later stopped on track, ending the session early.

In the second practice session, Bird was quickest with a lap of 1 minute. 8.792 seconds, ahead of Rosenqvist, di Grassi third. Buemi, Robin Frijns, Piquet, Turvey, Vergne, Prost and Maro Engel (Venturi). Turvey hit the chicane's barrier with Adam Carroll and Bird spinning their cars in turn five. Loïc Duval's left-front tyre lost a wheel nut, causing it to detach and stopping the session. As a result of the stoppage to retrieve Duval's tire and the two in first practice, the second session was extended by five minutes. Shortly after practice restarted, Engel stopped at the turn one exit with car problems but a second stoppage was not required because he was off the track. Di Grassi pushed hard and hit the turn four wall, damaging his car's front-right corner and rear; yellow flags were waved to warn drivers about the crash.

== Qualifying ==
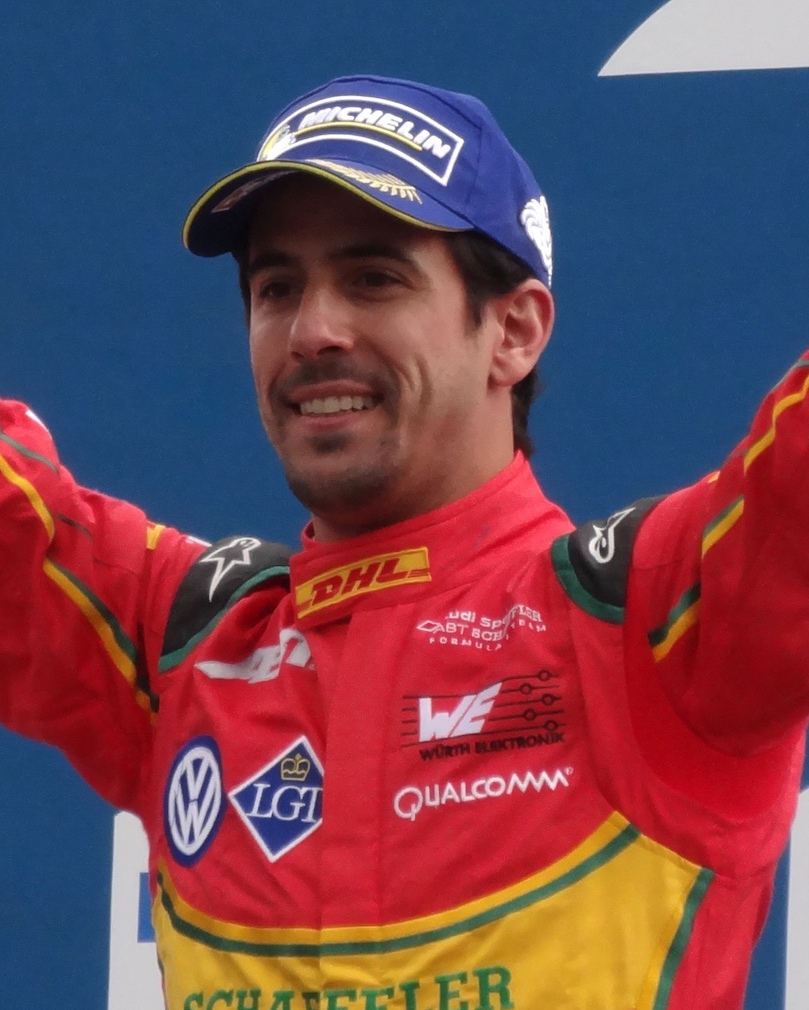
Lucas di Grassi (pictured in 2016) had the first pole position of his Formula E career.

Saturday afternoon's qualifying session ran for 60 minutes and was divided into four groups of five cars. Each group was determined by a lottery system and was permitted six minutes of on-track activity. All drivers were limited to two timed laps with one at maximum power. The fastest five overall competitors in the four groups participated in a "Super Pole" session with one driver on the track at any time going out in reverse order from fifth to first. Each of the five drivers was limited to one timed lap and the starting order was determined by the competitor's fastest times (Super Pole from first to fifth, and group qualifying from sixth to twentieth). The driver and team who recorded the fastest time were awarded three points towards their respective championships. The session was held in warm and dry weather.

In the first group, Evans was quickest, three-tenths of a second faster than Bird in second, and Frijns third. Evans' teammate Carroll and Engel (who stopped twice on track because of technical issues) were the group's two slowest drivers. Bird cited difficulty in gaining optimum tyre temperature for his performance. Vergne used clear air to go fastest in the second group with a late lap that was two-tenths of a second faster than Buemi. Di Grassi, Piquet and Jérôme d'Ambrosio rounded out the top five. The third session was delayed when Vergne and Piquet were investigated by the stewards for an irregularity. Félix da Costa stopped his car on the racing line at the turn one exit and the yellow flag was shown until he performed a restart, allowing him to keep driving. Rosenqvist was fastest in the third group, with Stéphane Sarrazin and Duval second and third. An oversteer through turn seven put López into a barrier, and damaged the car's rear-right corner. He stopped further down the track and the session was temporarily stopped. Race control granted Félix da Costa permission to complete his timed lap but damaged his front-right suspension in an collision with the chicane's inside barrier. Both López and Félix da Costa started the race from the grid's ninth row.

In the fourth group, Turvey was fastest by more than one second than teammate Piquet. Prost was third-fastest, and led until Turvey's lap. Both Daniel Abt and Ma Qinghua collided with the turn four exit barrier, curtailing their session. After group qualifying, Turvey, Piquet, di Grassi, Vergne and Buemi qualified for super pole by recording fast enough lap times. The start of the super pole session was delayed to cater for the removal of a bollard at the chicane. Piquet was the first driver to attempt his lap in super pole, losing half a second because he locked his front tyres and struggled with the rear balance of his car and was fifth. Turvey lacked grip through the seventh turn, causing him to lock his tyres and missed the following turn's apex and took fourth position. Despite going slower than Turvey in the track's first third, di Grassi drove cleanly through turn seven to record a provisional pole position lap time of 1 minute, 9.404 seconds. Buemi started his lap cleanly but lost half a second in the track's first third by locking his tyres which placed him off the racing line and took third. Vergne was the fastest driver in the first third of the lap but heavily locked his tyres, qualifying second. Hence, di Grassi secured his first pole position in Formula E. The rest of the grid lined up as Prost, Evans, Rosenqvist, d'Ambrosio, Bird, Sarrazin, Heidfeld, Frijns, Duval, Carroll, Abt, Félix da Costa, López, Ma and Engel.

=== Qualifying classification ===
Final qualifying classification
Pos.	No.	Driver	Team	GS	SP	Grid
1	11	(Brazil) Lucas di Grassi	Audi Sport ABT	1:09.084	1:09.404	1
2	25	(France) Jean-Éric Vergne	Techeetah-Renault	1:08.751	1:09.598	2
3	9	(Switzerland) Sébastien Buemi	e.Dams-Renault	1:09.018	1:09:825	3
4	88	(United Kingdom) Oliver Turvey	NextEV NIO	1:09.314	1:10:075	4
5	3	(Brazil) Nelson Piquet Jr.	NextEV NIO	1:09.383	1:11.274	5
6	8	(France) Nico Prost	e.Dams-Renault	1:09.442	—N/a	6
7	20	(New Zealand) Mitch Evans	Jaguar	1:09.505	—N/a	7
8	19	(Sweden) Felix Rosenqvist	Mahindra	1:09.681	—N/a	8
9	7	(Belgium) Jérôme d'Ambrosio	Dragon-Penske	1:09.697	—N/a	9
10	2	(United Kingdom) Sam Bird	Virgin-Citroën	1:09.839	—N/a	10
11	4	(France) Stéphane Sarrazin	Venturi	1:10.100	—N/a	11
12	23	(Germany) Nick Heidfeld	Mahindra	1:10.152	—N/a	12
13	27	(Netherlands) Robin Frijns	Andretti-BMW	1:10.172	—N/a	13
14	6	(France) Loïc Duval	Dragon-Penske	1:10.257	—N/a	14
15	47	(United Kingdom) Adam Carroll	Jaguar	1:10.946	—N/a	15
16	66	(Germany) Daniel Abt	Audi Sport ABT	1:13.284	—N/a	16
17	28	(Portugal) António Félix da Costa	Andretti-BMW	1:13.326	—N/a	17
18	37	(Argentina) José María López	Virgin-Citroën	1:16.760	—N/a	18
19	33	(China) Ma Qinghua	Techeetah-Renault	1:22.405	—N/a	19
20	5	(Germany) Maro Engel	Venturi	1:44.239	—N/a	20

== Race ==
A special feature of Formula E is the "Fan Boost" feature, an additional 100 kW (130 hp) of power to use in the driver's second car. The three drivers who were allowed to use the boost were determined by a fan vote. For the Buenos Aires race, Buemi, di Grassi and Abt were handed the extra power. The weather at the start were dry and sunny with the air temperature between 29.0 to 29.7 °C (84.2 to 85.5 °F) with a track temperature at 26 °C (79 °F); a 90 per cent chance of rain was forecast. When the race started at 16:00 Argentina Time (UTC+3) before 21,000 attendees, di Grassi maintained the lead entering the first turn. Vergne held off Buemi to keep second. Rosenqvist made a brisk start, overtaking Evans and Prost and challenged Piquet for fifth. The full course yellow was necessitated when Carroll was unable to move off the grid but was able to restart his car as the field came to lap him. Carroll was ordered by his team to catch up to everyone else while abiding by the full course yellow speed limit. At the end of the first lap, di Grassi led from Vergne, Buemi, Turvey, Piquet, Rosenqvist, Prost, d'Ambrosio, Bird and Evans.

The race restarted on lap two with di Grassi leading and Vergne second. Evans overtook d'Ambrosio to move into eighth place, while Vergne began challenging di Grassi for the lead. Vergne passed di Grassi at turn four on the third lap to claim the lead and di Grassi immediately battled Buemi for second position. Buemi overtook di Grassi for second place three corners later, while Vergne set what was at that point the fastest lap of the race—at 1 minute, 12.926 seconds—to pull away from Buemi. After sustaining damage to his vehicle's rear-right suspension, Bird fell to the rear of the field. Piquet went off the racing line and lost fifth position to Prost. Buemi got a fast exit through the final corner, drafted off Vergne before turning left onto the inside line and passed him by braking late to take the lead at the first corner on lap six. Buemi took a wide line to prevent Vergne from retaking the position entering turn two. Di Grassi struggled with his car's handling and Turvey overtook him for third place and Prost closed the gap to di Grassi. Buemi pulled away from the rest of the field. Bird made a pit stop with the damage to his car and switched into his second vehicle, intending to recording the fastest lap but he would not be able to finish the race.

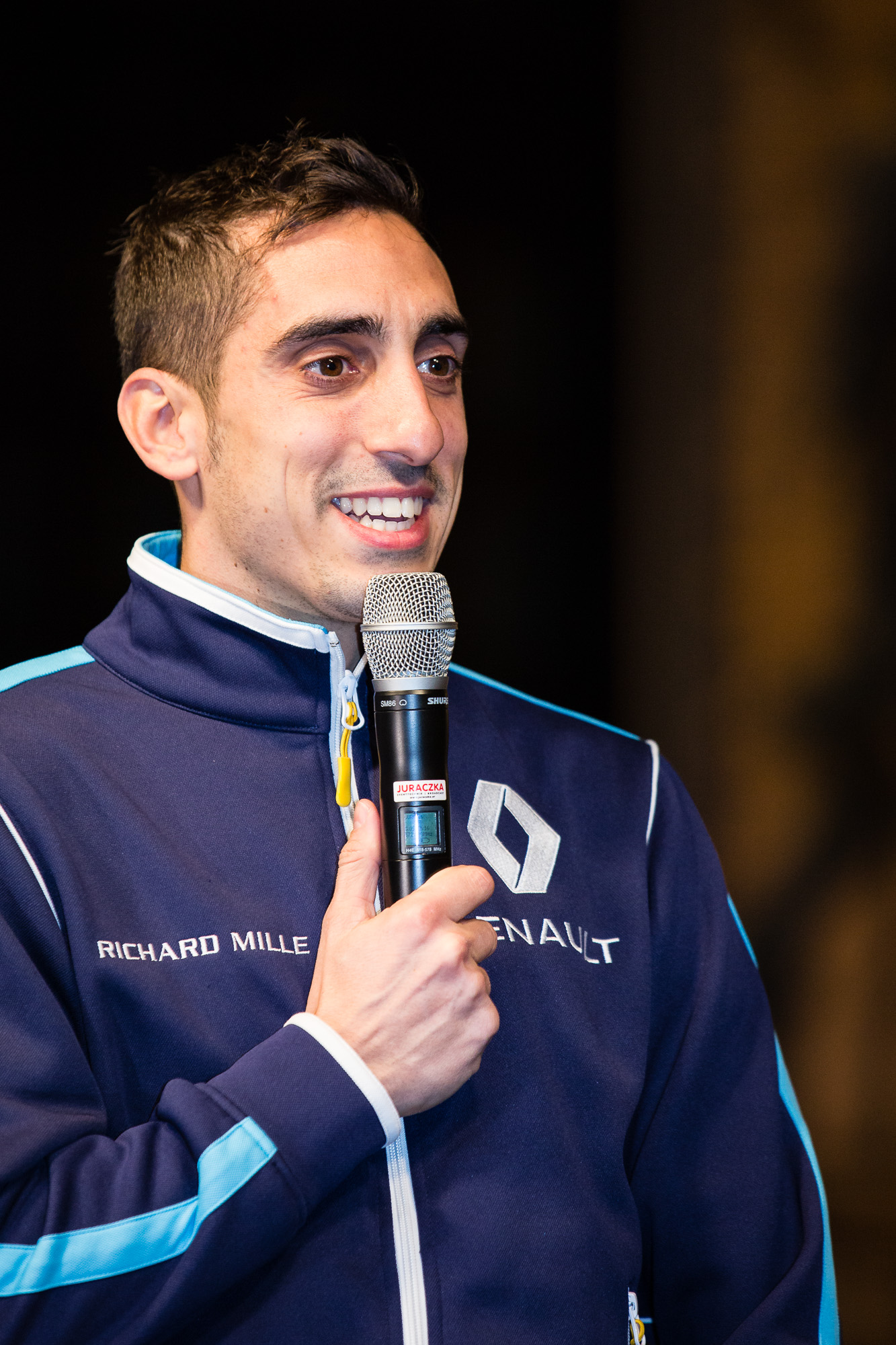
Sébastien Buemi (pictured in 2016) took the ninth victory of his career and was the first driver to win three consecutive races in Formula E history.

Engel stopped on the track with powertrain issues; after he restarted, he was shown a black flag with an orange circle, requiring him to enter the pit lane to repair car damage. Prost overtook di Grassi around the inside at turn four to claim fourth position on lap 12, and Piquet reduced the time deficit to di Grassi. López forced Sarrazin wide through the fourth turn to take over 18th on the following lap. Buemi led Vergne by 4.5 seconds Vergne with Turvey, Prost and di Grassi close by for the third place battle. The mandatory pit stops change into a second car began on lap 19 when Turvey, Evans and Duval entered the pit lane. Evans was imposed a five-second time penalty after he was observed to have exceeded the speed limit under full course yellow conditions. Most drivers followed one lap later and after the pit stops Buemi was in third place. Di Grassi was released into Piquet's path, causing the latter to brake to avoid a collision. Engel lost engine power at his pit stop and retired from the race. Mahindra elected to keep their drivers Rosenqvist and Heideld on the track for one further lap to allow both drivers to push in the finals laps from having more electrical energy.

Rosenqvist's car failed to start because of a battery management system problem that left him stationary in his garage for one minute longer than usual, and rejoined the circuit in 17th place. Di Grassi closed up to Prost, used an error by the latter leaving the final turn, and overtook him by braking late on the inside into the first turn for third on lap 24. Frijns battled Abt for tenth because the latter was delaying several cars but later used FanBoost to pull away. Heidfeld overtook Sarrazin and Frijns for 11th but the stewards imposed a five-second time penalty on him for exceeding the minimum pit stop time by four-tenths of a second and fell to 15th. Di Grassi pushed hard in an effort to close up to Vergne but he reacted by stabilising his lead to two seconds. Buemi activated FanBoost to extend his advantage over Vergne, while Rosenqvist set the race's fastest lap (and overall race track record) at 1 minute, 9.467 seconds on lap 31, earning him one point. Lopez gained three positions to run in 11th by lap 35 and the stewards announced that di Grassi was under investigation for his pit stop release on that lap.

Both Dragon drivers were informed over their radios that they had to ensure that they finished the race while Duval was told d'Ambrosio had more electrical energy. Duval reduced the time deficit to teammate d'Ambrosio and attempted an overtake for sixth place, causing light contact between the duo and passed him. Abt overtook Turvey for eighth. On the final lap, Bird was forced wide into a wall by d'Ambrosio, causing him to retire. Despite braking difficulties on his second car that rendered him unable to brake in a straight line, Buemi took his third victory of the season, the ninth of his career, and became the first driver in the history of Formula E to win three consecutive races. Vergne finished 2.9 seconds behind in second, with di Grassi in third, Prost fourth, Piquet fifth and Duval sixth. Abt used the rest of his electrical energy to pass d'Ambrosio for seventh. Turvey's car overheated and took ninth and López finished tenth. Félix da Costa and Sarrazin finished 11th and 12th. Evans was in a points-scoring position but a slower pace dropped him to 13th. Frijns, Heidfeld, Ma, Carroll and Rosenqvist were the final finishers. There were four lead changes in the race; four drivers reached the front of the field. Buemi led twice for a total of 31 laps, more than any other competitor.

=== Post-race ===
The top three drivers appeared on the podium to collect their trophies and spoke to the media in a later press conference. Buemi was delighted with the race victory, praising his team for their work and said he was hopeful his recent form would continue into the season's next rounds. His team was concerned over his battery overheating; Buemi stated that he drove cautiously in the first few laps to know where he was and that he had the situation under control. Second-place finisher Vergne was delighted because of his relatively new team having had no prior testing of his car, new personnel and equipment. He said he corrected the problems he had in the season's first two races and felt certain that he would focus on winning races: "I think the whole team did a fantastic job, working really, really hard, sometimes many hours overnight and in the end it paid off." Di Grassi, who finished in third, said that it was a good day for his team although he acknowledged he was not on the same pace levels as the e.Dams-Renaults. He revealed his first car had excess oversteer and stated the smallest of change would make a large difference in terms of the championship.

Di Grassi was imposed a formal reprimand and a €1,500 fine by the stewards for the pit stop release that caused Piquet to brake to avoid hitting him. Piquet felt it was unfair for different punishments to exist for the same penalty and complained of inconsistency from the stewards. He warned drivers would become quickly disenchanted and believed stewards would not be taken seriously in the future. Piquet advocated for more people to observe the track, install more cameras and a GPS system in all cars. D'Ambrosio felt aggrieved over the battle between his teammate Duval, saying it was "a little bit of a pity" and was unsure whether it was a misunderstanding. Duval insisted the battle was firm but fair, saying he gave d'Ambrosio room but would make it difficult for anyone to overtake him: "As you have seen in the past though we have had fights and most of the time I was really gentle, and this weekend I was in this position where I was competitive and I had less energy available so I fought." Dragon's team principal Jay Penske revealed his drivers were allowed to battle each other cleanly but if one eliminated the other from contention, that driver would be required to miss the following race.

Attention also focused on Jaguar's improved pace in Buenos Aires. Prior to the race, the team had been criticised by the media for their inability to perform well in Formula E with some publications criticising the decision to sign Evans and Carroll to the squad. Evans said his improved performance encouraged Jaguar's staff and made the team more confident: "If you look at the bigger picture, I’ve got to be satisfied with today. Qualifying was great, to be honest, I topped the group. If you ask me or the whole team if this would have happened after Marrakesh, we would have taken it with both hands." Carroll stated he hoped to have perform well in Buenos Aires and go quicker but it was an issue that could be improved on. Jaguar team principal James Barclay said the improvement was "a little bit of a positive surprise" but was unsure if Carroll's problem at the start was caused by driver error or an electrical issue. He admitted the team had to improve their understanding of the full course yellow procedure in future races.

The result extended Buemi's lead at the top of the Drivers' Championship to 29 points in front of second-placed di Grassi, who in turn, was a further ten ahead of Prost in third. Vergne's second-place finish moved him to fourth on 22 points and Rosenqvist was fifth on 20 points. e.Dams-Renault's strong result increased their advantage in the Teams' Championship over Audi Sport ABT to 51 points, with Mahindra remaining in third place on 37 points. NextEV moved into fourth on 25 points with Techeetah three points behind in fifth with nine rounds left in the season.

=== Race classification ===
Drivers who scored championship points are denoted in bold.

Final race classification
Pos.	No.	Driver	Team	Laps	Time/Retired	Grid	Points
1	9	(Switzerland) **Sébastien Buemi**	**e.dams-Renault**	37	45:45.623	3	**25**
2	25	(France) **Jean-Éric Vergne**	**Techeetah-Renault**	37	+2.996	2	**18**
3	11	(Brazil) **Lucas di Grassi**	**Audi Sport ABT**	37	+6.921	1	**15+3**^{1}
4	8	(France) **Nico Prost**	**e.dams-Renault**	37	+8.065	6	**12**
5	3	(Brazil) **Nelson Piquet Jr.**	**NextEV NIO**	37	+9.770	5	**10**
6	6	(France) **Loïc Duval**	**Dragon-Penske**	37	+35.103	14	**8**
7	66	(Germany) **Daniel Abt**	**Audi Sport ABT**	37	+35.801	16	**6**
8	7	(Belgium) **Jérôme d'Ambrosio**	**Dragon-Penske**	37	+36.335	9	**4**
9	88	(United Kingdom) **Oliver Turvey**	**NextEV NIO**	37	+37.111	4	**2**
10	37	(Argentina) **José María López**	**Virgin-Citroën**	37	+38.206	18	**1**
11	28	(Portugal) António Félix da Costa	Andretti-BMW	37	+43.740	17	
12	4	(France) Stéphane Sarrazin	Venturi	37	+44.243	11	
13	20	(New Zealand) Mitch Evans	Jaguar	37	+44.918	7	
14	27	(Netherlands) Robin Frijns	Andretti-BMW	37	+49.683	13	
15	23	(Germany) Nick Heidfeld	Mahindra	37	+51.456	12	
16	33	(China) Ma Qinghua	Techeetah-Renault	36	+1 Lap	19	
17	47	(United Kingdom) Adam Carroll	Jaguar	36	+1 Lap	15	
18	19	(Sweden) **Felix Rosenqvist**	**Mahindra**	34	+3 Laps	8	**1**^{2}
Ret	5	(Germany) Maro Engel	Venturi	26	Electrical	20	
Ret	2	(United Kingdom) Sam Bird	Virgin-Citroën	20	Accident	10	

Notes:

- **^1** — Three points for pole position.
- **^2** — One point for fastest lap.

== Standings after the race ==
Drivers' Championship standings

+/–	Pos	Driver	Points
	1	(Switzerland) Sébastien Buemi	75
	2	(Brazil) Lucas di Grassi	46 (−29)
	3	(France) Nico Prost	36 (−39)
8	4	(France) Jean-Éric Vergne	22 (−53)
1	5	(Sweden) Felix Rosenqvist	20 (−55)

Teams' Championship standings

+/–	Pos	Constructor	Points
	1	(France) e.Dams-Renault	111
	2	(Germany) Audi Sport ABT	60 (−51)
	3	(India) Mahindra	37 (−74)
2	4	(China) NextEV NIO	25 (−86)
3	5	(China) Techeetah-Renault	22 (−89)

- Notes: Only the top five positions are included for both sets of standings.

Previous race: 2016 Marrakesh ePrix	FIA Formula E Championship; 2016–17 season	Next race: 2017 Mexico City ePrix
Previous race: 2016 Buenos Aires ePrix	Buenos Aires ePrix	Next race: None
