= 2015 Buenos Aires ePrix =

- Race 4 of 11 of the 2014–15 Formula E season
- Layout of the Puerto Madero Street Circuit

Race details
- Date: 10 January 2015
- Official name: 2015 FIA Formula E Buenos Aires ePrix
- Location: Puerto Madero Street Circuit, Buenos Aires, Argentina
- Course: Street circuit
- Course length: 2.407 km (1.495 miles)
- Distance: 35 laps, 84.245 km (52.347 miles)

Pole position
Driver	(Switzerland) Sébastien Buemi	e.dams-Renault
- Time: 1:09.134

Fastest lap
Driver	(United Kingdom) Sam Bird	Virgin Racing
- Time: 1:11.540 on lap 29

Podium
First	(Portugal) António Félix da Costa	Amlin Aguri
Second	(France) Nicolas Prost	e.dams-Renault
Third	(Brazil) Nelson Piquet Jr.	China Racing

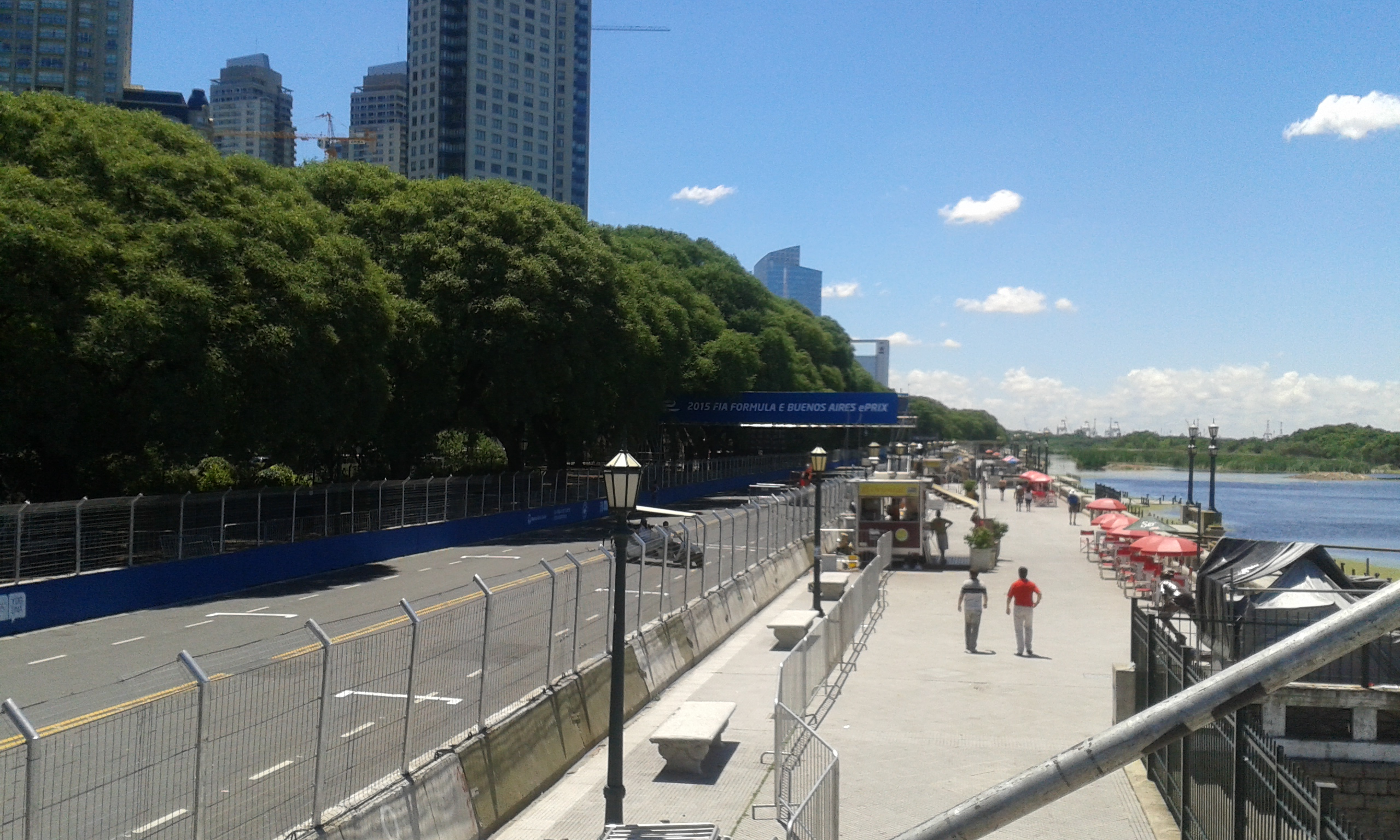
Puerto Madero Street Circuit, previous to the 2015 Buenos Aires ePrix.

The 2015 Buenos Aires ePrix, formally the 2015 FIA Formula E Buenos Aires ePrix was a Formula E motor race held on 10 January 2015 at the Puerto Madero Street Circuit in Puerto Madero, Buenos Aires, Argentina. It was the first edition of the Buenos Aires ePrix and the fourth championship race of the single-seater, electrically powered racing car series' inaugural season. The race was won by António Félix da Costa.

== Report ==
=== Background ===
Nick Heidfeld, Jean-Éric Vergne, and Bruno Senna were voted to receive the FanBoost (an extra 30 kW for five seconds per car).

=== Race ===
Sébastien Buemi started on pole position, with Jaime Alguersuari and Nick Heidfeld behind him. Going into the first hairpin, Heidfeld managed to brake later and overtake Alguersuari on the outside. The field seemed to be free of incidents throughout the first couple of laps, but Michela Cerruti was seen entering the pits, possibly after making contact with Bruno Senna. Meanwhile, championship leader Lucas di Grassi overtook Sam Bird for fourth position and Heidfeld deployed his FanBoost at the main straight, but he failed to take the lead from Buemi. On lap 7, di Grassi passed Alguersuari and moved up to third, and passed Heidfeld in turn five, on lap 14. Heidfeld fell further down the order when he had to use the run-off area at turn 8 and was overtaken by both Virgin drivers.

The first major incident of the race happened on lap 16, when Karun Chandhok's right-rear suspension broke and he hit the wall. Just before the race was neutralised, Heidfeld managed to take his position back from Bird, and Alguersuari was seen entering the pits with five others. Those who waited a lap to come in, including Buemi and di Grassi, were stuck behind Cerruti, because overtaking was not permitted under yellow flags. Because the safety car picked up the leader at the moment Buemi was in the pits, there was much confusion about who was in the lead. However, it was still Buemi, di Grassi, and Heidfeld at the top of the standings, so on lap 21, every driver not in the lead lap was told to pass the safety car and catch up with the rest of the field.

Green flags showed with thirteen laps to go. Almost immediately, however, the leader Buemi hit the wall on the inside of turn 8, broke his suspension and had to retire. The top three was now filled by di Grassi, Heidfeld, and Bird, but the latter quickly received a drive-through penalty for ignoring the red lights at the end of the pit lane. On lap 26, di Grassi's suspension broke in the same fashion as Chandhok's had done, sending another race leader into retirement. The safety car was not deemed to be required, because both Buemi and di Grassi had managed to park their cars safely.

The last three laps saw Jean-Éric Vergne aggressively overtaking Alguersuari for third place and Nick Heidfeld being given a drive-through penalty for going over the pit lane speed limit, making António Félix da Costa, who had been relatively invisible throughout the race, the fourth race leader in ten laps. Meanwhile, Alguersuari was being attacked by Nicolas Prost, Nelson Piquet Jr. and Daniel Abt. Vergne joined them when he missed his braking point twice and fell back from second to fifth. Abt tried to overtake Prost on the dirtier side of the track, but ended up hitting the back of Alguersuari instead and retiring with one lap to go. Félix da Costa took victory, with Prost second, Piquet third, Alguersuari fourth, and Senna fifth; Vergne had had to slow down to save energy.

== Results ==
=== Qualifying ===
Pos.	No.	Driver	Team	Time	Gap	Grid
1	9	(Switzerland) Sébastien Buemi	e.dams-Renault	1:09.134	-	1
2	3	(Spain) Jaime Alguersuari	Virgin Racing	1:09.161	+0.027	2
3	23	(Germany) Nick Heidfeld	Venturi	1:09.367	+0.233	3
4	2	(United Kingdom) Sam Bird	Virgin Racing	1:09.388	+0.254	4
5	11	(Brazil) Lucas di Grassi	Audi Sport ABT	1:09.521	+0.387	5
6	27	(France) Jean-Éric Vergne	Andretti	1:09.527	+0.393	6
7	8	(France) Nicolas Prost	e.dams-Renault	1:09.636	+0.502	7
8	55	(Portugal) António Félix da Costa	Amlin Aguri	1:09.658	+0.524	8
9	99	(Brazil) Nelson Piquet Jr.	China Racing	1:09.742	+0.608	9
10	5	(India) Karun Chandhok	Mahindra Racing	1:09.875	+0.741	10
11	30	(France) Stéphane Sarrazin	Venturi	1:10.165	+1.031	11
12	66	(Germany) Daniel Abt	Audi Sport ABT	1:10.329	+1.195	12
13	6	(Spain) Oriol Servià	Dragon Racing	1:10.588	+1.454	13
14	28	(United States) Marco Andretti	Andretti	1:10.713	+1.579	14
15	88	(China) Ho-Pin Tung	China Racing	1:11.049	+1.915	15
16	23	(Mexico) Salvador Durán	Amlin Aguri	1:11.331	+2.197	16
17	18	(Italy) Michela Cerruti	Trulli	1:11.785	+2.651	17
18	7	(Belgium) Jérôme d'Ambrosio	Dragon Racing	1:12.239	+3.105	PL
19	21	(Brazil) Bruno Senna	Mahindra Racing	1:13.209	+4.075	19
20	10	(Italy) Jarno Trulli	Trulli	No time		20^{1}

- ^1 ㄧ Jarno Trulli has been given a 10-place grid penalty for changing the gearbox

=== Race ===
Pos.	No.	Driver	Team	Laps	Time/Retired	Grid	Points
1	55	(Portugal) António Félix da Costa	Amlin Aguri	35	48:52.100	8	25
2	8	(France) Nicolas Prost	e.dams-Renault	35	+5.354s	7	18
3	99	(Brazil) Nelson Piquet Jr.	China Racing	35	+8.552s	9	15
4	3	(Spain) Jaime Alguersuari	Virgin Racing	35	+11.148s	2	12
5	21	(Brazil) Bruno Senna	Mahindra Racing	35	+11.535s	19	10
6	27	(France) Jean-Éric Vergne	Andretti	35	+13.319s	6	8
7	2	(United Kingdom) Sam Bird	Virgin Racing	35	+13.617s	4	6+2^{2}
8	23	(Germany) Nick Heidfeld	Venturi	35	+15.464	3	4
9	6	(Spain) Oriol Servià	Dragon Racing	35	+19.334	13	2
10	30	(France) Stéphane Sarrazin	Venturi	35	+28.973	11	1
11	88	(China) Ho-Pin Tung	China Racing	35	+37.858^{3}	15	
12	28	(United States) Marco Andretti	Andretti	34	+1 lap	14	
13	66	(Germany) Daniel Abt	Audi Sport ABT	33	Collision^{4}	12	
14	7	(Belgium) Jérôme d'Ambrosio	Dragon Racing	33	+2 laps	PL	
Ret	10	(Italy) Jarno Trulli	Trulli	30	Mechanical	20	
Ret	11	(Brazil) Lucas di Grassi	Audi Sport ABT	26	Suspension	5	
Ret	9	(Switzerland) Sébastien Buemi	e.dams-Renault	23	Suspension	1	3^{1}
Ret	18	(Italy) Michela Cerruti	Trulli	20	Mechanical	17	
Ret	5	(India) Karun Chandhok	Mahindra Racing	15	Suspension	10	
DSQ	77	(Mexico) Salvador Durán	Amlin Aguri	35	+14.724s^{5}	16	

Notes:

- ^1 – Three points for pole position.
- ^2 – Two points for fastest lap.
- ^4 - Ho Pin Tung has been given a drive through penalty converted into a 35-seconds time penalty for not reaching the minimum pit stop time.
- ^4 - Daniel Abt has been given a drive through penalty converted into a 35-seconds time penalty for causing a collision.
- ^5 – Salvador Durán finished in eighth position, but was disqualified for exceeding the maximum power usage.
- Lap leaders: 1-22 Buemi; 23-25 di Grassi; 26-32 Heidfeld; 33-35 da Costa

== Standings after the race ==
Drivers' Championship standings

Pos	Driver	Points
1	(Brazil) Lucas di Grassi	58
2	(United Kingdom) Sam Bird	48
3	(Switzerland) Sébastien Buemi	43
4	(France) Nicolas Prost	42
5	(Brazil) Nelson Piquet Jr.	37

Teams' Championship standings

Pos	Constructor	Points
1	(France) e.dams-Renault	85
2	(United Kingdom) Virgin Racing	74
3	(Germany) Audi Sport ABT	62
4	(United States) Andretti	41
5	(United States) Dragon Racing	38

- Notes: Only the top five positions are included for both sets of standings.

Previous race: 2014 Punta del Este ePrix	FIA Formula E Championship; 2014–15 season	Next race: 2015 Miami ePrix
Previous race: N/A	Buenos Aires ePrix	Next race: 2016 Buenos Aires ePrix
