= Puerto Madero Street Circuit =

Race track in Buenos Aires, Argentina

- Location: Puerto Madero, Buenos Aires, Argentina
- Coordinates: 34°36′53″S 58°21′27″W
- Opened: 9 January 2015; 10 years ago
- Closed: 18 February 2017; 8 years ago
- Architect: Santiago García Remohí
- Major events: Formula E Buenos Aires ePrix (2015–2017)

Street Circuit (2015–2017)
- Length: 2.480 km (1.541 mi)
- Turns: 12
- Race lap record: 1:09.467 ( (Sweden) Felix Rosenqvist, Mahindra M3Electro, 2017, Formula E)

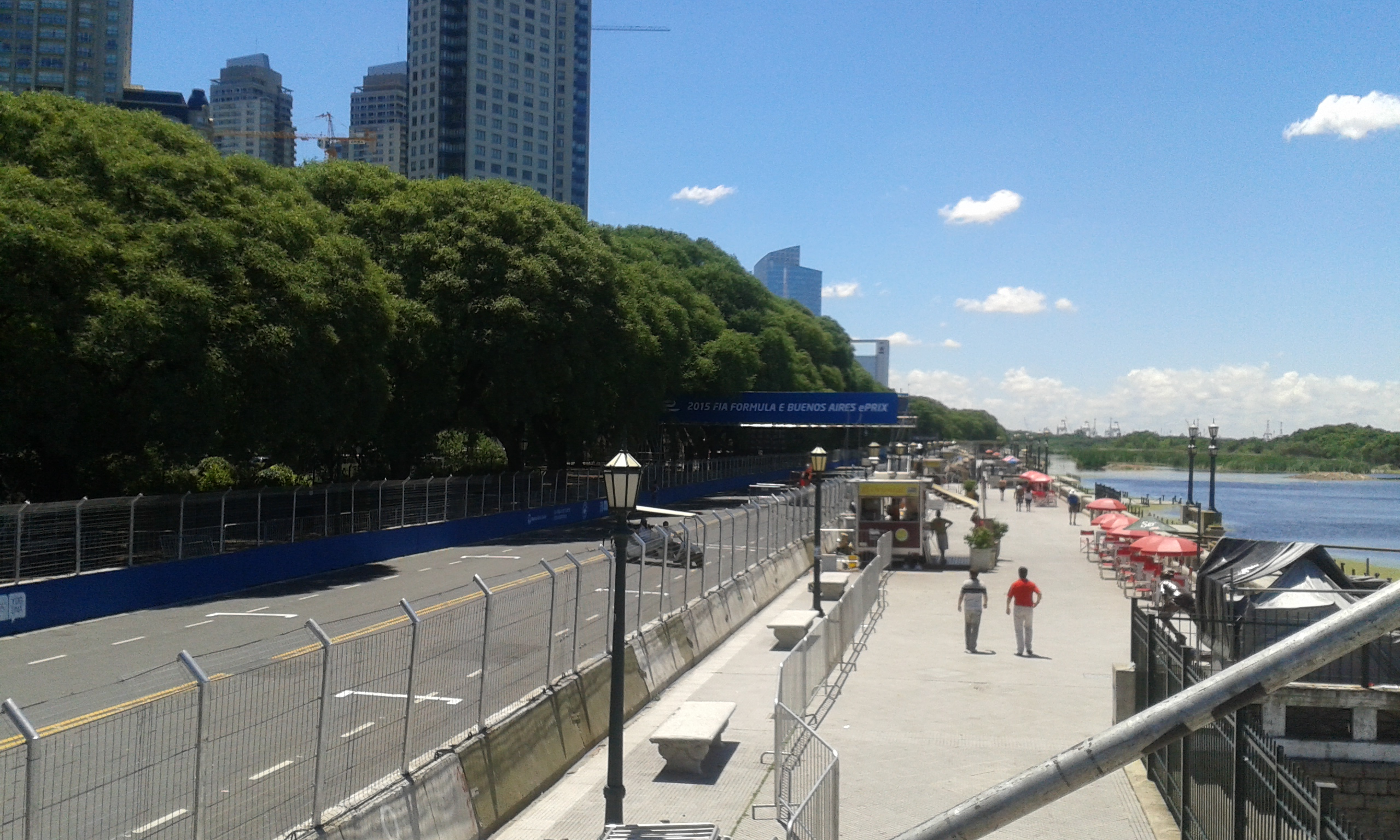
Puerto Madero Street Circuit, previous to the 2015 Buenos Aires ePrix.

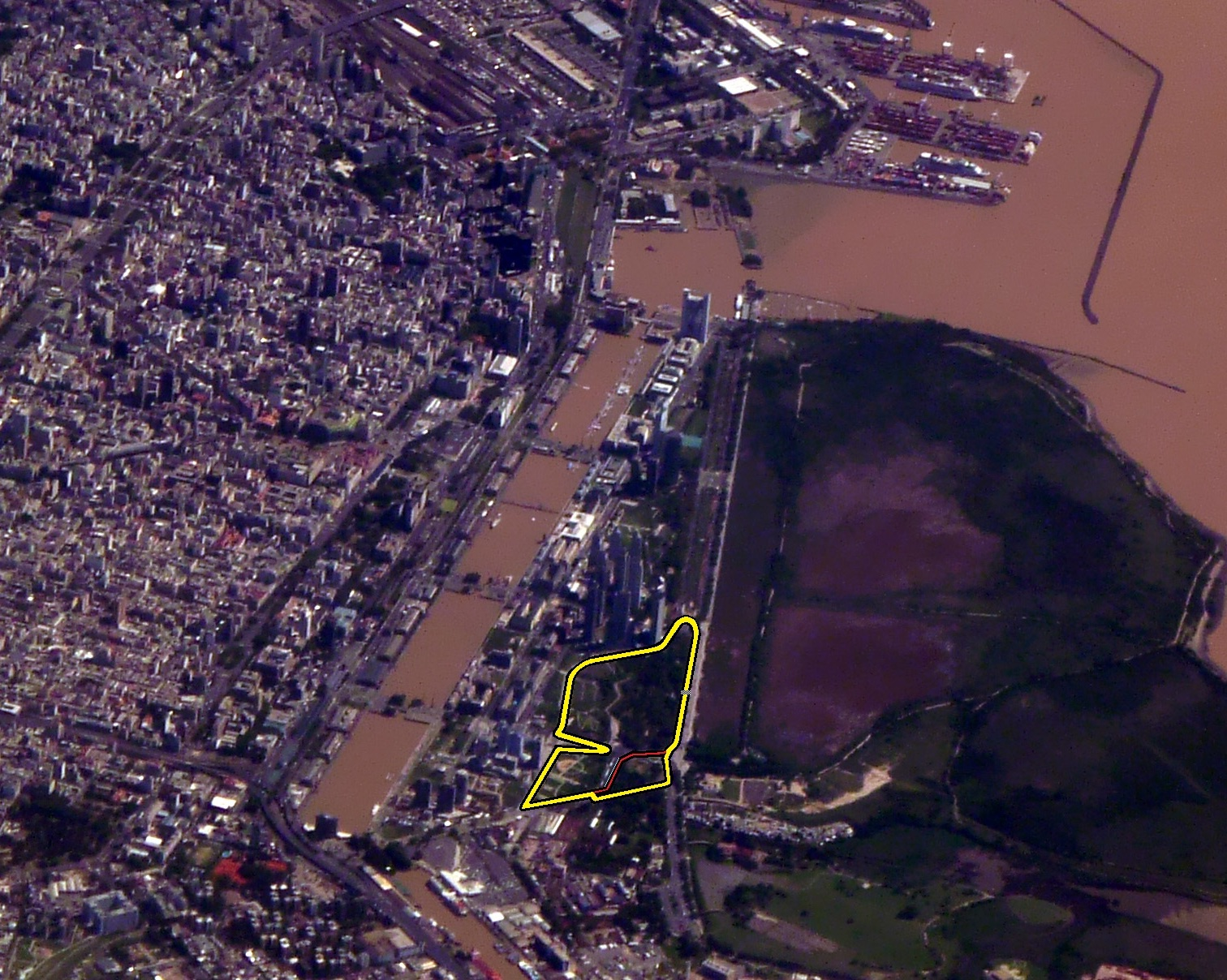
View of the location and surroundings of the circuit at the city for the Buenos Aires ePrix.

The Puerto Madero Street Circuit was a street circuit located in Puerto Madero, Buenos Aires. It was used for the first time on 10 January 2015 for the fourth ePrix of Formula E. The track was 2.480 km (1.541 mi) in length and featured 12 turns. The circuit was designed by Santiago García Remohí. The circuit was the only venue to have featured in the first three seasons, however it did not feature in the fourth season.
