= Nico Prost =

French professional racing driver (born 1981)

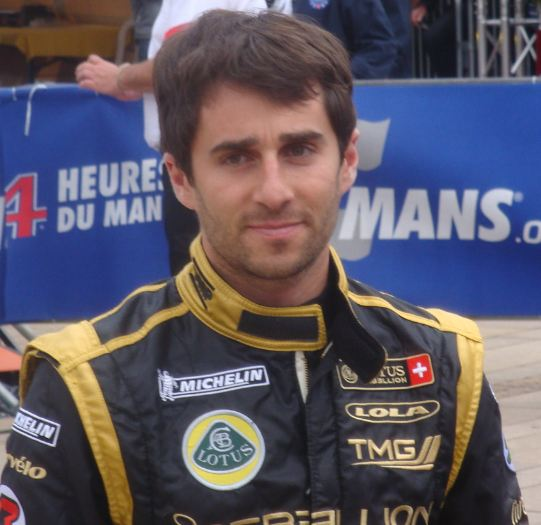
- Prost at the 2012 24 Hours of Le Mans
- Nationality: (France) French
- Born: Nicolas Jean Prost; 18 August 1981 (age 45) Saint-Chamond, France
- Relatives: Alain Prost (father)

FIA World Endurance Championship career
- Debut season: 2012
- Current team: Rebellion Racing
- Categorisation: FIA Platinum
- Car number: 12
- Starts: 41
- Wins: 4
- Poles: 1
- Fastest laps: 0
- Best finish: 3rd in 2017
- Finished last season: 3rd

Formula E career
- Debut season: 2014–15
- Car number: 8
- Former teams: Renault e.dams
- Starts: 45
- Wins: 3
- Podiums: 5
- Poles: 3
- Fastest laps: 2
- Best finish: 3rd in 2015–16
- Finished last season: 19th

24 Hours of Le Mans career
- Years: 2007, 2009 –
- Teams: Team Oreca, Speedy Racing Team Sebah, Rebellion Racing
- Best finish: 4th (2012, 2014)
- Class wins: 1 (2014)

Previous series
- 2015 2011–13 2011–12 2010 2009–11 2009–10, 2010–11 2008–09 2008 2006–07 2005 2005 2004–05 2004–05 2004 2003: Stock Car Brasil; American Le Mans Series; Andros Trophy; FIA GT1 World Championship; Le Mans Series; Andros Trophy Électrique; A1 Grand Prix; Euroseries 3000; Spanish Formula Three Championship; Formula Renault 3.5 Series; Eurocup Formula Renault 2.0; FFSA GT Championship; Formula Renault 2000 France; Formula Renault 2000 Germany; Formula Campus France

Championship titles
- 2014, 2015 2009–10, 2010–11 2008: WEC LMP1 Private Teams Drivers' Trophy; Andros Trophy Électrique; Euroseries 3000

Nicolas Jean Prost (born 18 August 1981) is a French professional racing driver. He competed in the FIA Formula E Championship between 2014 and 2018. Previously, he was a longstanding racer in the FIA World Endurance Championship for Lotus Rebellion Racing, winning the 2014 24 Hours of Le Mans in class alongside Nick Heidfeld and Mathias Beche. He competes in the Andros Trophy.

Prost was a reserve driver for the now defunct Lotus F1 team. He is a son of four-time Formula One world champion Alain Prost.

== Early life ==
Born in Saint-Chamond, Loire, and despite being the oldest son of four-time Formula One World Drivers' champion Alain Prost and his wife Anne-Marie, he started his career at the late age of 22 in Formula Campus. He was born two days after his father had competed in the 1981 Austrian Grand Prix. Like his father, Prost is a golfer, and has won numerous tournaments during his tenure at Columbia University in New York.

== Career ==
=== Formula Three ===
In 2006, Prost joined Racing Engineering to contest in the Spanish Formula Three Championship. He won one race and had six podiums, which earned him fourth place in the championship as well as the best rookie title.

In 2007, Prost finished third in the Spanish Formula Three Championship with two wins, one pole and seven podiums.

=== Euro Formula 3000 ===
In 2008, Prost joined Bull Racing and won the Euroseries 3000 championship in his first year with one win, two poles and seven podiums.

=== A1 Grand Prix ===
For A1 GP season 3 (2007–2008), Prost was the rookie driver for Team France.

For A1 GP season 4 (2008–2009), Prost was still the rookie driver and topped every single rookie sessions. He was promoted to racing driver for the end of the season and showed that he had the pace to fight on top. The team issued in a statement at the end of the seasons that he should be driving the entire 2009–2010 season.

=== Sports car racing ===
==== 24 Hours of Le Mans ====
In 2007, Prost competed with Team Oreca in a Saleen S7-R with Laurent Groppi and Jean-Philippe Belloc and finished fifth in his category.

In 2009, Prost raced for the first time in the LMP1 category, with Speedy Racing Team Sebah. He drove a great race, especially on Sunday morning with a stunning quadruple stint which moved the car from eighth to fifth. Unfortunately, a gearbox problem later dropped the car to 14th.

After a difficult year in 2010, where he nonetheless drove the fastest lap of rebellion cars, Prost had a great race in 2011. Prost and his teammates Jani and Bleekemolen finished sixth and first in the unofficial petrol class.

In the 80th edition of the 24 Hours of Le Mans in 2012, Prost and the Rebellion Racing Team got the fourth place in the LM-P1 class along with his co-drivers Neel Jani and Nick Heidfeld, their Lola B12/60 Coupe Toyota covered a total of 367 laps (3,108.123 miles), in the Circuit de la Sarthe. Prost drove the last stage of the competition.

==== Le Mans Series ====
In 2009, Prost participated in the European Le Mans Series for Speedy Racing Team Sebah alongside Marcel Fässler and Andrea Belicchi. The trio finished 5th in the championship. Since 2010, he is racing in the European Le Mans Series for Rebellion Racing alongside Swiss racing driver Neel Jani.

==== FIA World Endurance Championship ====
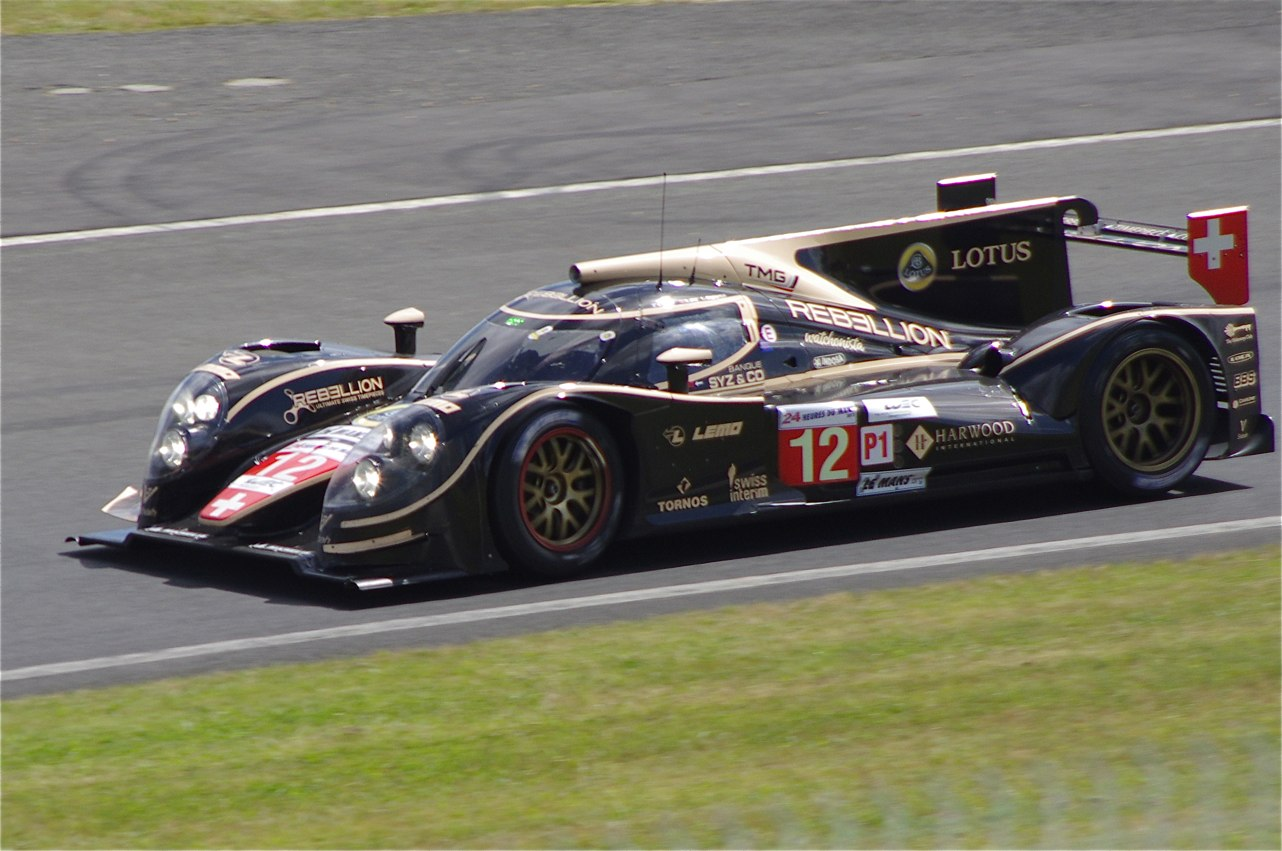
The Lola B12/60 that Prost drove in the 2012 24 Hours of Le Mans.

In 2012 and 2013, Prost competed in the FIA World Endurance Championship with Rebellion Racing in a LMP1-class Lola B12/60 Toyota. With his mate Neel Jani, they won nine races in these two years in the LMP1 privateer category. He would race the new Rebellion R-One in the 2014 FIA World Endurance Championship season. Prost has won the first four races of 2014 in the LMP1-L Category and has already clinched the title in the category.

==== American Le Mans Series ====
Prost clinched back to back victories at Petit Le Mans in 2012 and 2013. He also finished third in the Sebring 12 Hours in 2013.

=== Andros Trophy ===
During the 2009–2010 winter, Prost participated to the famous Andros Trophy ice racing series in the electrical car category. He clinched the championship with five poles, six wins, and eighteen podiums out of 21 races. He successfully defended his title during the 2010–2011 winter.

In 2011–2012, Prost joined his dad in the works Dacia team and claimed the rookie title in the main series.

=== Formula One ===
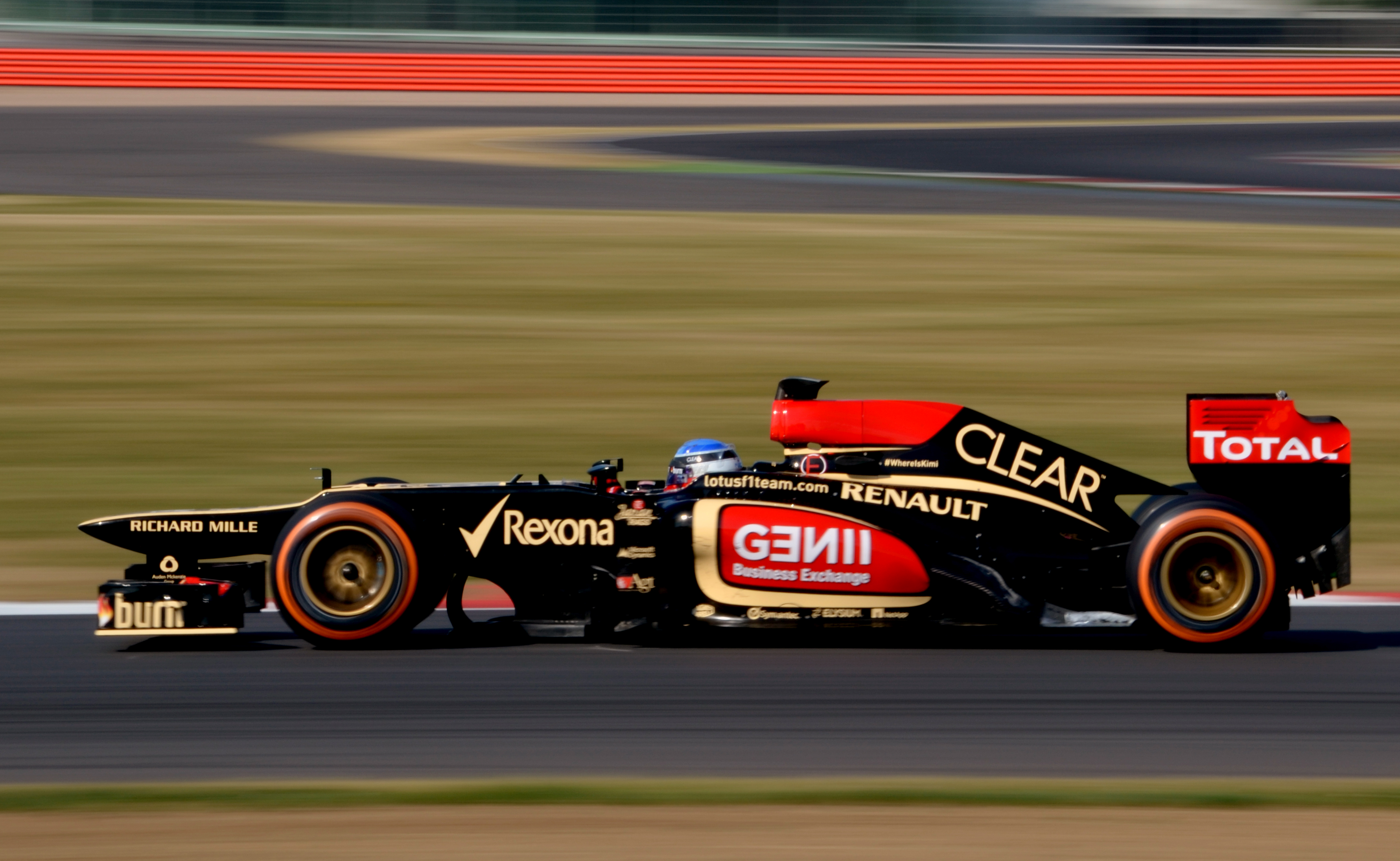
Prost testing for Lotus in 2013.

In 2010, Prost drove a Renault F1 for the first time in Magny-Cours and impressed the team, beating his daily opponent by more than two seconds.

In 2011, Prost joined the gravity management structure and remained a driver for Lotus Renault F1. He drove some test sessions and straight line tests for the team, as well as some commercial roadshows.

In 2012, Prost remained a part of the Lotus Renault program, and on 4 October 2012, it was announced that he would be testing with Lotus Renault Formula One during the young driver test at Abu Dhabi.

In 2013, Prost was still test and development driver for Lotus. He drove the rookie test in Silverstone where he posted the absolute fastest lap among the rookies and was only three tenths behind Vettel in the Red Bull.

In 2014, Prost remained test and development driver for Lotus.

=== Formula E ===
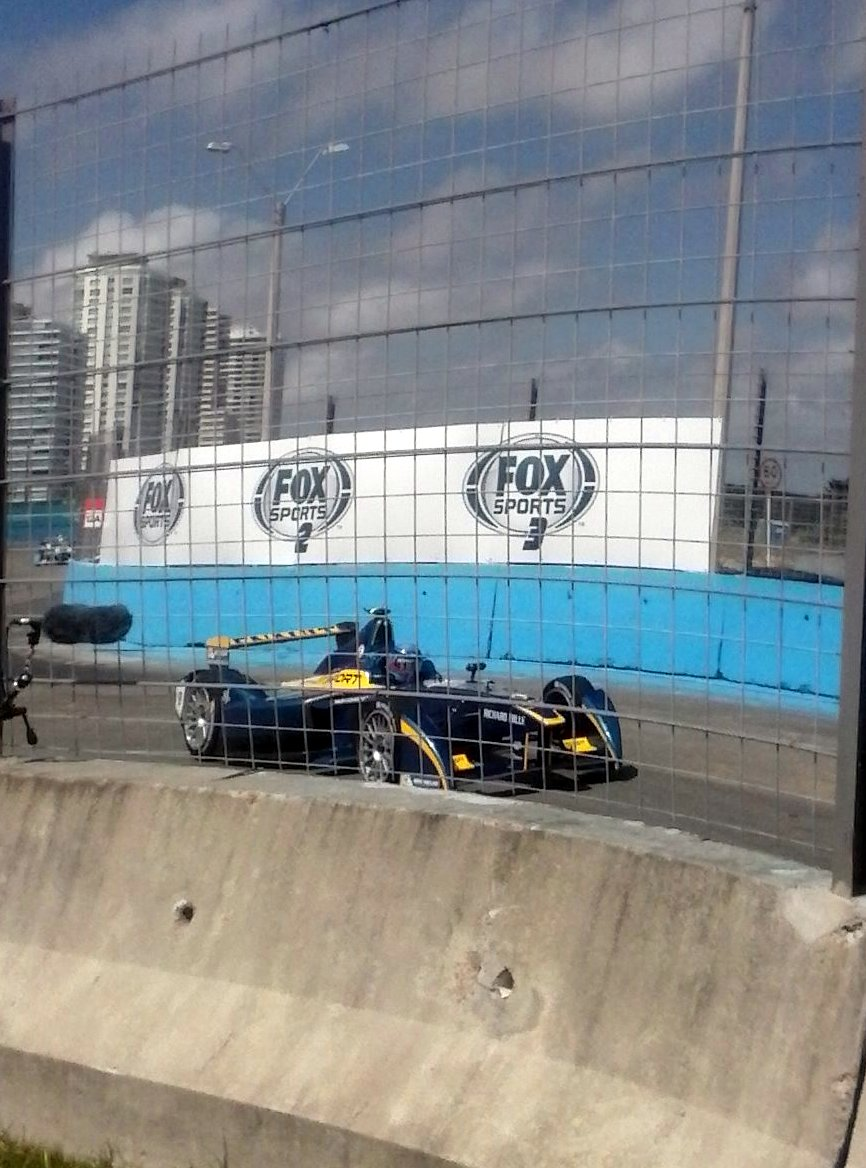
Prost racing in the 2014 Punta del Este ePrix

On 30 June 2014, Prost signed up for the inaugural FIA Formula E Championship with the team e.dams Renault. At the first race in Beijing, Prost became the first man to achieve a pole position in Formula E. He led the race until the last lap in the last corner where he was involved in a heavy crash with Nick Heidfeld. Prost turned into Heidfeld's car when he was being challenged into the last corner, lunging Heidfeld's car into a barrier. He later apologised for the incident. He was subsequently given a ten place grid penalty for the following race in Malaysia. In the second race in Putrajaya, Malaysia, he took pole position again but was given a ten place grid penalty carried from the previous race. He took his first win in Miami, despite a late challenge from Scott Speed. He would end up finishing the season in sixth place in the standings. The following season would be the highlight of his Formula E career, as he had finished third in the final standings of the 2015-16 Formula E championship.

== Racing record ==
=== Career summary ===
Season	Series	Team	Races	Poles	Wins	F/Laps	Podiums	Points	Position
2004	Formula Renault 2000 Germany	PlayStation Junior Team Oreca	2	0	0	0	0	5	40th
2005	French Formula Renault 2.0	Graff Racing	16	0	0	0	0	43	9th
2005	Eurocup Formula Renault 2.0	Graff Racing	4	0	0	0	0	0	NC
2005	Formula Renault 3.5 Series	DAMS	2	0	0	0	0	0	NC
2005	FFSA GT Championship	Exagon Engineering	4	2	0	1	2	NC	NC
2006	Spanish Formula 3 Championship	Racing Engineering	16	0	1	0	5	83	4th
2007	Spanish Formula 3 Championship	Campos Racing	16	1	2	1	6	102	**3rd**
2007	24 Hours of Le Mans - GT1	Team Oreca	1	0	0	0	0	N/A	5th
2008	Euroseries 3000	Bull Racing	15	2	1	0	6	60	**1st**
2008–09	A1 Grand Prix	A1 Team France	8	0	0	0	0	47	5th
2009	Le Mans Series	Speedy Racing	5	0	0	0	1	14	5th
2009	24 Hours of Le Mans	Speedy Racing	1	0	0	0	0	N/A	12th
2009–10	Andros Trophy - Électrique Class	Team Pilot	21	5	6	7	18	250	**1st**
2010	FIA GT1 World Championship	Matech Competition	4	0	0	0	0	0	49th
2010	Le Mans Series	Rebellion Racing	5	0	0	0	2	52	5th
2010	24 Hours of Le Mans	Rebellion Racing	1	0	0	0	0	N/A	NC
2010–11	Andros Trophy - Électrique Class	Team Pilot	28	8	8	7	23	332	**1st**
2011	Le Mans Series	Rebellion Racing	5	2	0	1	2	37	**3rd**
2011	24 Hours of Le Mans	Rebellion Racing	1	0	0	0	0	N/A	6th
2011	Intercontinental Le Mans Cup	Rebellion Racing	6	0	0	0	0	N/A	NC
2012	FIA World Endurance Championship	Rebellion Racing	8	0	0	0	1	86.5	4th
2012	24 Hours of Le Mans	Rebellion Racing	1	0	0	0	0	N/A	4th
2012	American Le Mans Series - P1	Rebellion Racing	1	1	1	1	1	N/A	NC
2013	Formula One	Lotus F1 Team	Test driver						
2013	FIA World Endurance Championship	Rebellion Racing	7	0	0	0	1	60	6th
2013	24 Hours of Le Mans	Rebellion Racing	1	0	0	0	0	N/A	39th
2013	American Le Mans Series - P1	Rebellion Racing	2	1	2	1	2	48	5th
2014	FIA World Endurance Championship	Rebellion Racing	8	0	0	0	0	64.5	10th
2014	24 Hours of Le Mans	Rebellion Racing	1	0	0	0	0	N/A	4th
2014–15	Formula E	e.dams Renault	11	2	1	1	2	89	6th
2015	FIA World Endurance Championship	Rebellion Racing	6	0	0	0	0	14.5	14th
2015	24 Hours of Le Mans	Rebellion Racing	1	0	0	0	0	N/A	23rd
2015	Stock Car Brasil	Prati-Donaduzzi	1	0	0	0	0	0	NC†
2015–16	Formula E	Renault e.dams	10	1	2	1	3	115	**3rd**
2016	FIA World Endurance Championship	Rebellion Racing	4	0	0	0	0	25.5	14th
2016	24 Hours of Le Mans	Rebellion Racing	1	0	0	0	0	N/A	29th
2016–17	Formula E	Renault e.dams	12	0	0	1	0	93	6th
2016–17	Andros Trophy - Électrique Class	Rebellion Racing	7	0	0	0	0	178	8th
2017	FIA World Endurance Championship - LMP2	Vaillante Rebellion	8	4	1	0	7	168	**3rd**
2017	24 Hours of Le Mans - LMP2	Vaillante Rebellion	1	0	0	0	0	N/A	14th
2017–18	Formula E	Renault e.dams	12	0	0	0	0	8	19th
2017–18	Andros Trophy - Elite Pro Class	DA Racing	4	0	0	0	0	200	14th
2017–18	Andros Trophy - Elite Pro Class	Trophée Andros	0	0	0	0	0	200	14th
2018–19	Andros Trophy - Elite Pro Class	Exagon Engineering	11	0	0	2	0	545	7th
2019–20	Andros Trophy - Elite Pro Class	DA Racing	10	1	1	1	2	462	5th
2020	French GT4 Cup - Pro-Am	CMR	12	2	0	0	6	143	4th
2020–21	Andros Trophy - Elite Pro Class	DA Racing	11	0	0	0	4	489	5th
2021	French GT4 Cup - Pro Am	CMR	12	2	0	1	4	108	5th
2021	Ultimate Cup Series - Challenge Monoplace	CMR	17	6	4	4	17	444	**1st**
2021–22	Andros Trophy - Elite Pro Class	DA Racing	9	0	0	0	1	449	6th
2022	Ultimate Cup Series - Challenge Monoplace	CMR	18	10	?	?	15	479	**1st**
2023	Ultimate Cup Series - Sprint GT Touring Challenge - C4A	CMR	2	1	1	2	2	42	7th
2023–24	Middle East Trophy - GTX	Toro Verde GT	1	1	?	?	1	0	NC†
2024	Ultimate Cup Series - Proto P3	CMR	5	0	0	0	0	18.5	19th
2025	Middle East Trophy - GT4	Team CMR	1	0	?	?	0	0	NC†
2025	European Endurance Prototype Cup	Cogemo Racing	6	2	2	0	2	63	5th
2025–26	24H Series Middle East - GTX	Team CMR	1	0	?	?	1	0	NC†
2026	European Endurance Prototype Cup	Cogemo Racing Team	5	1	1	0	4	92.5*	**2nd***

^{†} As Prost was a guest driver, he was ineligible for championship points.

=== 24 Hours of Le Mans results ===
Year	Team	Co-Drivers	Car	Class	Laps	Pos.	Class Pos.
2007	(France) Team Oreca	(France) Laurent Groppi (France) Jean-Philippe Belloc	Saleen S7-R	GT1	337	10th	5th
2009	(Switzerland) Speedy Racing Team (United Kingdom) Sebah Automotive	(Italy) Andrea Belicchi (Switzerland) Neel Jani	Lola B08/60-Aston Martin	LMP1	342	14th	12th
2010	(Switzerland) Rebellion Racing	(Switzerland) Neel Jani (United States) Marco Andretti	Lola B10/60-Rebellion	LMP1	175	DNF	DNF
2011	(Switzerland) Rebellion Racing	(Switzerland) Neel Jani (Netherlands) Jeroen Bleekemolen	Lola B10/60-Toyota	LMP1	338	6th	6th
2012	(Switzerland) Rebellion Racing	(Germany) Nick Heidfeld (Switzerland) Neel Jani	Lola B12/60-Toyota	LMP1	367	4th	4th
2013	(Switzerland) Rebellion Racing	(Germany) Nick Heidfeld (Switzerland) Neel Jani	Lola B12/60-Toyota	LMP1	275	39th	7th
2014	(Switzerland) Rebellion Racing	(Germany) Nick Heidfeld (Switzerland) Mathias Beche	Rebellion R-One-Toyota	LMP1-L	360	4th	**1st**
2015	(Switzerland) Rebellion Racing	(Germany) Nick Heidfeld (Switzerland) Mathias Beche	Rebellion R-One-AER	LMP1	330	23rd	10th
2016	(Switzerland) Rebellion Racing	(Germany) Nick Heidfeld (Brazil) Nelson Piquet Jr.	Rebellion R-One-AER	LMP1	330	29th	6th
2017	(Switzerland) Vaillante Rebellion	(Brazil) Bruno Senna (France) Julien Canal	Oreca 07-Gibson	LMP2	340	16th	14th

=== Complete Eurocup Formula Renault 2.0 results ===
(key) (Races in bold indicate pole position; races in italics indicate fastest lap)

Year	Entrant	1	2	3	4	5	6	7	8	9	10	11	12	13	14	15	16	DC	Points
2005	Graff Racing	ZOL; 1; 25	ZOL; 2; 16	VAL; 1; 25	VAL; 2; 24	LMS; 1	LMS; 2	BIL; 1	BIL; 2	OSC; 1	OSC; 2	DON; 1	DON; 2	EST; 1	EST; 2	MNZ; 1	MNZ; 2	42nd	0

=== Le Mans Series results ===
Year	Entrant	Class	Chassis	Engine	1	2	3	4	5	Rank	Points
2009	Speedy Racing Team Sebah Automotive	LMP1	Lola B08/60	Aston Martin 6.0 L V12	CAT; 7	SPA; 8	ALG; Ret	NÜR; 6	SIL; 2	10th	14
2010	Rebellion Racing	LMP1	Lola B10/60	Rebellion (Judd) 5.5 L V10	CAS; 7	SPA; Ret	ALG; 2	HUN; 2	SIL; 5	7th	52
2011	Rebellion Racing	LMP1	Lola B10/60	Toyota RV8KLM 3.4 L V8	CAS; 3	SPA; 7	IMO; 6	SIL; Ret	EST; 3	3rd	37

=== Intercontinental Le Mans Cup results ===
Year	Entrant	Class	Chassis	Engine	1	2	3	4	5	6	7
2011	Rebellion Racing	LMP1	Lola B10/60	Toyota RV8KLM 3.4 L V8	SEB; 7	SPA; 7	LEM; 6	IMO; 6	SIL; Ret	PET; 5	ZHU; 4

=== Complete FIA World Endurance Championship results ===
Year	Entrant	Class	Chassis	Engine	1	2	3	4	5	6	7	8	9	Rank	Points
2012	Rebellion Racing	LMP1	Lola B12/60	Toyota (RV8KLM 3.4 L V8)	SEB; 17	SPA; 5	LMS; 3	SIL; 6	SÃO; 4	BHR; 4	FUJ; 4	SHA; Ret		4th	86.5
2013	Rebellion Racing	LMP1	Lola B12/60	Toyota (RV8KLM 3.4 L V8)	SIL; 5	SPA; 5	LMS; 20	SÃO; 3	COA; 4	FUJ	SHA; 4	BHR; Ret		6th	60
2014	Rebellion Racing	LMP1	Lola B12/60	Toyota (RV8KLM 3.4 L V8)	SIL; 4	SPA; 7	LMS; 4	COA; 7	FUJ; 12	SHA; 7	BHR; 7	SÃO; 8		10th	64.5
2015	Rebellion Racing	LMP1	Rebellion R-One	AER P60 2.4 L Turbo V6	SIL	SPA	LMS; 19	NÜR; 16	COA; 15	FUJ; 7	SHA; 7	BHR; 14		14th	14.5
2016	Rebellion Racing	LMP1	Rebellion R-One	AER P60 2.4 L Turbo V6	SIL; 4	SPA; 4	LMS; 13	NÜR; 17	MEX	COA	FUJ	SHA	BHR	14th	25.5
2017	Vaillante Rebellion	LMP2	Oreca 07	Gibson GK428 4.2 L V8	SIL; 2	SPA; 2	LMS; 6	NÜR	MEX; 1	COA; 3	FUJ; 1	**SHA**; 1	BHR; 1	3rd	168

=== Complete Formula E results ===
(key) (Races in bold indicate pole position; races in italics indicate fastest lap)

Year	Team	Chassis	Powertrain	1	2	3	4	5	6	7	8	9	10	11	12	Pos	Points
2014–15	e.dams Renault	Spark SRT01-e	SRT01-e	**BEI**; 12†	**PUT**; 4	PDE; 7	BUE; 2	MIA; 1	LBH; 14	MCO; 6	BER; 10	MSC; 8	LDN; 7	LDN; 10		6th	88
2015–16	Renault e.dams	Spark SRT01-e	Renault Z.E 15	BEI; Ret	PUT; 10	PDE; 5	BUE; 5	MEX; 3	LBH; 11	PAR; 4	BER; 4	**LDN**; 1	LDN; 1			3rd	115
2016–17	Renault e.dams	Spark SRT01-e	Renault Z.E 16	HKG; 4	MRK; 4	BUE; 4	MEX; 5	MCO; 9	PAR; 5	BER; 5	BER; 8	NYC; 8	NYC; 6	MTL; 6	MTL; Ret	6th	93
2017–18	Renault e.dams	Spark SRT01-e	Renault Z.E 17	HKG; 9	HKG; 8	MRK; 13	SCL; 10	MEX; Ret	PDE; 15	RME; 14	PAR; 16	BER; 14	ZUR; Ret	NYC; 10	NYC; 11	19th	8

^{†} Driver did not finish the race, but was classified as he completed over 90% of the race distance.

Sporting positions
Preceded by Davide Rigon	Euroseries 3000; Champion; 2008	Succeeded by Will Bratt
Preceded by Inaugural	Andros Trophy Électrique; Champion; 2010–11, 2011–12	Succeeded by Christophe Ferrier
