= 2017 Copa Truck season =

Truck racing competition

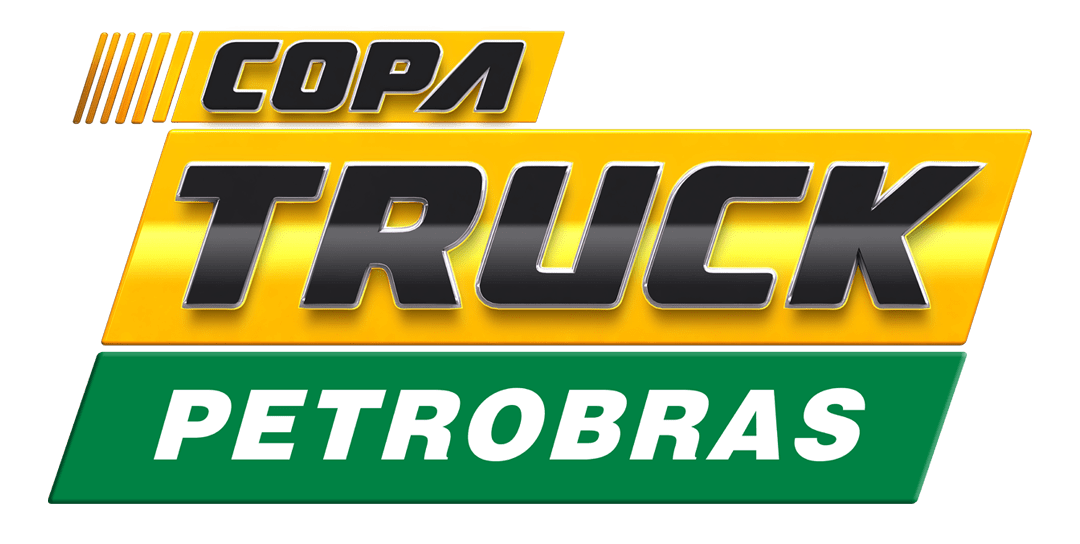
Official Logo

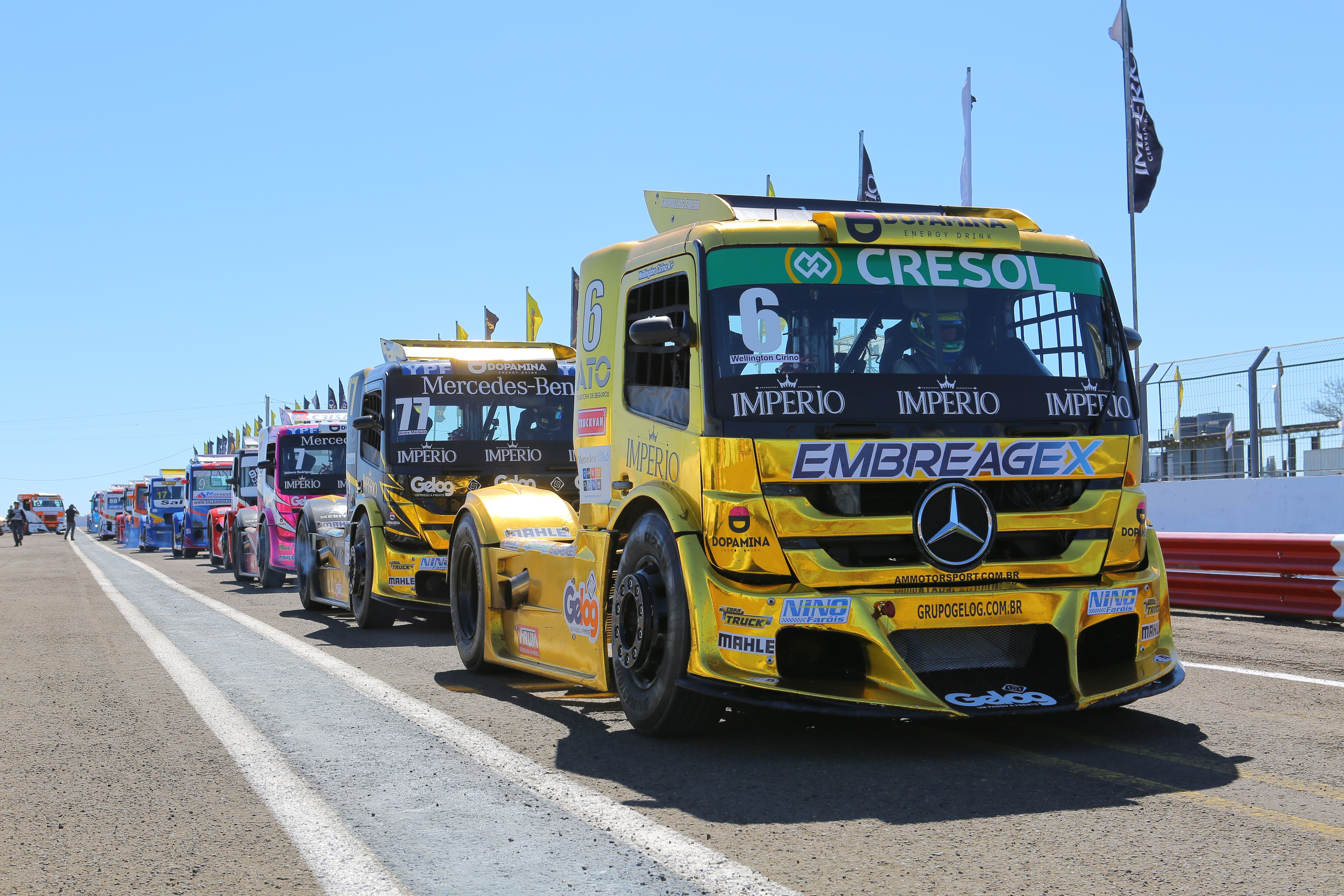
Copa Truck event

The 2017 Brazilian Truck Cup Championship was the first season of the Copa Truck. Felipe Giaffone became the inaugural Copa Truck Champion in 2017 onboard a Volkswagen from RM Competições. Pirelli was chosen to officially supply all teams in the series.

The category's origins came after nine teams left Formula Truck due to disagreements with the problematic management of Neusa Navarro Félix. These teams joined in an association to create the category that replaced Formula Truck. The new category brings together teams and drivers from the old category.

In November 2017, it was approved by the Brazilian Automobile Confederation (CBA) and recognized as an official championship. Carlos Col, former head of the Stock Car Pro Series, is its promoter.

The Truck Cup was officially launched on April 27, 2017, in São Paulo. In the first season, the championship was divided into three regional cups: Midwest, Northeast, and Southeast. The first stage took place on May 28, in Goiânia, with 17 trucks on the grid.

The association is made up of the following teams: RM Competições, AJ5 Sports, DF Motorsport, RVR Motorsports, Dakar Motors, Fábio Fogaça Motorsports, Lucar Motorsports and Clay Truck Racing.

== Teams and drivers ==
All drivers were Brazilian.

Team	Constructor	Tyre	No.	Driver	Rounds
(Brazil) AJ5-RM Competições	(Germany) Volkswagen	P	5	(São Paulo (state)) Adalberto Jardim	All
(Brazil) RM Competições	(Germany) Volkswagen	P	4	(São Paulo (state)) Vinícius Palma	1–2
(Brazil) RM Competições	(Germany) Volkswagen	P	4	(São Paulo (state)) Felipe Giaffone	3–12
(Brazil) RM Competições	(Germany) Volkswagen	P	7	(Paraná (state)) Débora Rodrigues	All
(Brazil) RM Competições	(Germany) Volkswagen	P	9	(São Paulo (state)) Renato Martins	1–8
(Brazil) RM Competições	(Germany) Volkswagen	P	35	(Paraná (state)) David Muffato	1–8
(Brazil) RM Competições	(Germany) Volkswagen	P	55	(São Paulo (state)) Paulo Salustiano	9–12
(Brazil) RM Competições	(Germany) MAN	P	9	(São Paulo (state)) Renato Martins	9–12
(Brazil) RM Competições	(Germany) MAN	P	11	(Paraná (state)) Rodrigo Belinati	1–4
(Brazil) RM Competições	(Germany) MAN	P	13	(São Paulo (state)) Witold Ramasauskas	5–12
(Brazil) Império Truck Racing/AM Motorsports	(Germany) Mercedes-Benz	P	6	(Paraná (state)) Wellington Cirino	3–8, 11–12
(Brazil) Império Truck Racing/AM Motorsports	(Germany) Mercedes-Benz	P	77	(São Paulo (state)) André Marques	3–8, 11–12
(Brazil) Império Truck Racing/AM Motorsports	(Germany) Mercedes-Benz	P	53	(São Paulo (state)) Ronaldo Kastropil	9–10
(Brazil) Boessio Competições	(Sweden) Volvo	P	83	(Rio Grande do Sul) Régis Boessio	All
(Brazil) Maistro Clay Truck Racing	(Sweden) Volvo	P	73	(Paraná (state)) Leandro Totti	1–8
(Brazil) Maistro Clay Truck Racing	(Sweden) Volvo	P	33	(Pará) Pablo Alves	9–12
(Brazil) DF Motorsport	(United States) Ford	P	27	(São Paulo (state)) Fábio Fogaça	1–4, 7–12
(Brazil) DF Motorsport	(United States) Ford	P	53	(Pernambuco) Sérgio Ramalho	5–6
(Brazil) DF Motorsport	(United States) Ford	P	72	(São Paulo (state)) Djalma Fogaça	All
(Brazil) Lucar Motorsport	(Italy) Iveco	P	88	(Pernambuco) Beto Monteiro	All
(Brazil) Lucar Motorsport	(Italy) Iveco	P	99	(São Paulo (state)) Luiz Lopes	All
(Brazil) Dakar-Corinthians Motorsports	(Italy) Iveco	P	15	(São Paulo (state)) Roberval Andrade	All
(Brazil) Corinthians–RVR Motorsports	(Sweden) Scania	P	28	(São Paulo (state)) Danilo Dirani	All
(Brazil) Corinthians–RVR Motorsports	(Sweden) Scania	P	25	(Paraná (state)) Jaidson Zini	3–6, 9–12
(Brazil) Original Reis Peças	(Sweden) Scania	P	12	(Goiás) José Maria Reis	1–8, 11–12
(Brazil) Original Reis Peças	(United States) Ford	P	33	(Pará) Pablo Alves	3–8
(Brazil) Original Reis Peças	(United States) Ford	P	133	(Goiás) Eurípedes Reis	11–12
(Brazil) Luhrs Motorsport	(Sweden) Scania	P	47	(Paraná (state)) Duda Bana	All
(Brazil) Luhrs Motorsport	(Sweden) Scania	P	44	(Santa Catarina (state)) Joel Mendes Júnior	1–8, 11–12
(Brazil) Grupo Biriba	(Sweden) Volvo	P	100	(Goiás) Júnior Biriba	9–10

== Calendar ==
=== Schedule ===
Round	Date	Grand Prix	Circuit	City
1	May 28	Grande Prêmio de Goiás	Autódromo Ayrton Senna	Goiânia, GO
2	June 11	Grande Prêmio de Mato Grosso do Sul	Autódromo Orlando Moura	Campo Grande, MS
3	July 9	Grande Prêmio de Pernambuco	Autódromo Ayrton Senna	Caruaru, PE
4	July 23	Grande Prêmio do Ceará	Autódromo Virgílio Távora	Fortaleza, CE
5	October 15	Grande Prêmio do Rio Grande do Sul	Autódromo de Tarumã	Viamão, RS
6	December 17	(São Paulo (state)) Grande Prêmio de São Paulo	Autódromo de Interlagos	São Paulo, SP

=== Results ===
Round	Circuit	Pole position	Fastest lap	Winning driver	Winning team	Constructor	Ref.
1	(Goiás) Autódromo Ayrton Senna	(São Paulo (state)) Roberval Andrade	(São Paulo (state)) Adalberto Jardim	(São Paulo (state)) Roberval Andrade	Dakar-Corinthians Motorsports	Iveco	
2	(Goiás) Autódromo Ayrton Senna	No dispute	(Pernambuco) Beto Monteiro	(Pernambuco) Beto Monteiro	Lucar Motorsport	Iveco	
3	(Mato Grosso do Sul) Autódromo Orlando Moura	(São Paulo (state)) Felipe Giaffone	(São Paulo (state)) Felipe Giaffone	(São Paulo (state)) Felipe Giaffone	RM Competições	Volkswagen	
4	(Mato Grosso do Sul) Autódromo Orlando Moura	No dispute	(São Paulo (state)) Felipe Giaffone	(São Paulo (state)) Felipe Giaffone	RM Competições	Volkswagen	
5	(Pernambuco) Autódromo Ayrton Senna	(São Paulo (state)) Felipe Giaffone	(São Paulo (state)) Felipe Giaffone	(São Paulo (state)) Felipe Giaffone	RM Competições	Volkswagen	
6	(Pernambuco) Autódromo Ayrton Senna	No dispute	(Paraná (state)) Wellington Cirino	(São Paulo (state)) André Marques	Império Truck Racing/AM Motorsports	Mercedes-Benz	
7	(Ceará) Autódromo Virgílio Távora	(São Paulo (state)) Felipe Giaffone	(São Paulo (state)) Felipe Giaffone	(São Paulo (state)) Felipe Giaffone	RM Competições	Volkswagen	
8	(Ceará) Autódromo Virgílio Távora	No dispute	(São Paulo (state)) Felipe Giaffone	(São Paulo (state)) Roberval Andrade	Dakar-Corinthians Motorsports	Iveco	
9	(Rio Grande do Sul) Autódromo de Tarumã	(São Paulo (state)) Danilo Dirani	(São Paulo (state)) Danilo Dirani	(São Paulo (state)) Danilo Dirani	Motul-GG Motorsport	Scania	
10	(Rio Grande do Sul) Autódromo de Tarumã	No dispute	(São Paulo (state)) Danilo Dirani	(São Paulo (state)) Witold Ramasauskas	RM Competições	MAN	
11	(São Paulo (state)) Autódromo de Interlagos	(São Paulo (state)) Felipe Giaffone	(São Paulo (state)) Roberval Andrade	(São Paulo (state)) Felipe Giaffone	RM Competições	Volkswagen	
12	(São Paulo (state)) Autódromo de Interlagos	No dispute	(São Paulo (state)) Felipe Giaffone	(São Paulo (state)) Roberval Andrade	Dakar-Corinthians Motorsports	Iveco	

== Championship standings ==
=== Drivers' Championship ===
Pos	Driver	(Goiás) GOI		(Mato Grosso do Sul) CGR		(Pernambuco) CAR		(Ceará) FOR		(Rio Grande do Sul) TAR		(São Paulo (state)) INT		Pts
1	(São Paulo (state)) Felipe Giaffone			1	1	1	3	1	2	2	3	1	3	184
2	(São Paulo (state)) Roberval Andrade	1	5	RET	8	6	6	2	1	4	2	3	1	175
3	(São Paulo (state)) Renato Martins	5	9	10	6	8	4	8	9	7	RET	7	2	127
4	(Pernambuco) Beto Monteiro	8	1	4	2	13	10	RET	5	5	RET	4	RET	117
5	(Paraná (state)) Débora Rodrigues	3	4	7	RET	9	12	RET	7	6	5	9	5	114
6	(São Paulo (state)) Luiz Lopes	6	7	8	RET	10	7	9	8	11	7	11	7	109
7	(São Paulo (state)) Adalberto Jardim	RET	RET	2	RET	4	5	RET	NL	9	4	5	8	93
8	(Rio Grande do Sul) Régis Boessio	4	2	6	4	RET	RET	5	RET	13	NL	RET	6	90
9	(São Paulo (state)) Fábio Fogaça	7	6	14	10			7	6	RET	9	RET	9	72
10	(São Paulo (state)) Witold Ramasauskas					11	9	RET	10	8	1	8	RET	64
11	(Paraná (state)) Wellington Cirino			NL	NL	2	2	6	RET			6	RET	64
12	(Goiás) José Maria Reis	9	8	15	9	14	RET	11	11			13	10	64
13	(São Paulo (state)) Danilo Dirani	2	RET	5	RET	RET	NL	RET	NL	1	10	RET	RET	63
14	(São Paulo (state)) André Marques			RET	RET	5	1	4	3			RET	RET	63
15	(Paraná (state)) David Muffato	RET	3	3	3	RET	13	RET	4					61
16	(Paraná (state)) Jaidson Zini			12	11	12	8			10	11	10	RET	56
17	(São Paulo (state)) Djalma Fogaça	12	RET	11	7	3	RET	RET	NL	RET	8	RET	RET	52
18	(São Paulo (state)) Paulo Salustiano									3	DSQ	2	4	50
19	(Paraná (state)) Duda Bana	11	RET	9	5	RET	RET	10	RET	RET	RET	RET	RET	41
20	(Paraná (state)) Leandro Totti	RET	RET	RET	RET	7	NL	3	NC					31
21	(Paraná (state)) Rodrigo Belinati	10	11	13	RET									22
22	(São Paulo (state)) Ronaldo Kastropil									12	6			18
23	(Pará) Pablo Alves			NL	RET	RET	11	RET	RET			12	RET	13
24	(Santa Catarina (state)) Joel Mendes Jr	RET	10	16	RET	RET	NL	RET	RET			RET	RET	6
—	(São Paulo (state)) Vinícius Palma	RET	RET											0
—	(Pernambuco) Sérgio Ramalho					NL	RET							0
Pos	Driver	(Goiás) GOI		(Mato Grosso do Sul) CGR		(Pernambuco) CAR		(Ceará) FOR		(Rio Grande do Sul) TAR		(São Paulo (state)) INT		Pts

Color	Result
Gold	Winner
Silver	2nd-place finish
Bronze	3rd-place finish
Green	Top 5 finish
Light Blue	Top 10 finish
Dark Blue	Other flagged position
Purple	Did not finish
Red	Did not qualify (DNQ)
Brown	Withdrew (Wth)
Black	Disqualified (DSQ)
White	Did Not Start (DNS)
White	Race abandoned (C)
Blank	Did not participate

=== Points standings ===
The three worst results of the season will be dropped from the final points tally.

Points	1°	2°	3°	4°	5°	6°	7°	8°	9°	10°	11°	12°	13°	14°	15°
Race 1	22	20	18	16	15	14	13	12	11	10	9	8	7	6	5
Race 2	18	16	14	12	11	10	9	8	7	6	5	4	3	2	1

== See also ==
- 2017 Stock Car Brasil Championship
- 2017 Brasileiro de Marcas
- 2017 Campeonato Brasileiro de Turismo season
- Moto 1000 GP
- SuperBike Brasil
- Fórmula Truck
