= Nelson Piquet Jr. =

Brazilian racing driver (born 1985)

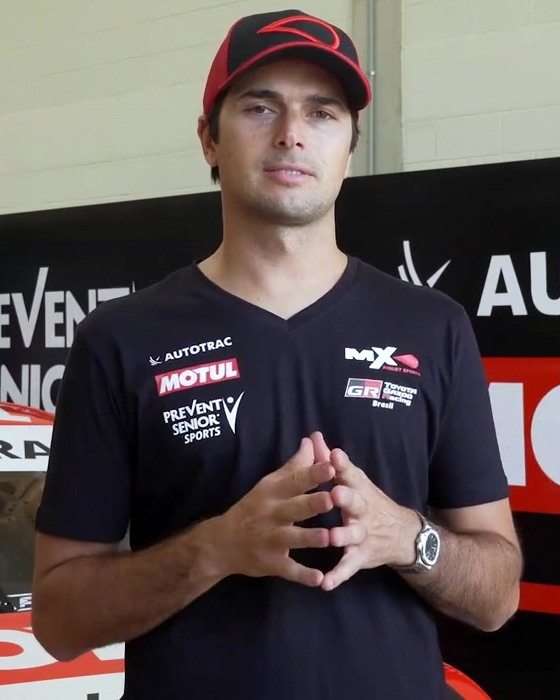
- Piquet in 2021
- Born: Nelson Ângelo Tamsma Piquet Souto Maior; July 25, 1985 (age 41) Heidelberg, West Germany

Formula E career
- Debut season: 2014–15
- Categorisation: FIA Platinum
- Car number: 3
- Former teams: NIO Formula E Team, Panasonic Jaguar Racing
- Starts: 51
- Championships: 1 (2014–15)
- Wins: 2
- Podiums: 5
- Poles: 1
- Fastest laps: 4
- Best finish: 1st in 2014–15
- Finished last season: 22nd

Formula One World Championship career
- Nationality: (Brazil) Brazilian
- Active years: 2008–2009
- Team: Renault
- Entries: 28
- Championships: 0
- Wins: 0
- Podiums: 1
- Career points: 19
- Pole positions: 0
- Fastest laps: 0
- First entry: 2008 Australian Grand Prix
- Last entry: 2009 Hungarian Grand Prix

NASCAR Cup Series career
- 1 race run over 1 year
- 2014 position: 53rd
- Best finish: 53rd (2014)
- First race: 2014 Cheez-It 355 at The Glen (Watkins Glen)
| Wins | Top tens | Poles |
|---|---|---|
| 0 | 0 | 0 |

NASCAR O'Reilly Auto Parts Series career
- 38 races run over 4 years
- 2016 position: 83rd
- Best finish: 12th (2013)
- First race: 2010 Zippo 200 (Watkins Glen)
- Last race: 2016 Mid-Ohio Challenge (Mid-Ohio)
- First win: 2012 Sargento 200 (Road America)
| Wins | Top tens | Poles |
|---|---|---|
| 1 | 7 | 1 |

NASCAR FedEx Freight Truck Series career
- 54 races run over 4 years
- 2013 position: 100th
- Best finish: 7th (2012)
- First race: 2010 NextEra Energy Resources 250 (Daytona)
- Last race: 2013 Ford EcoBoost 200 (Homestead)
- First win: 2012 VFW 200 (Michigan)
- Last win: 2012 Smith's 350 (Las Vegas)
| Wins | Top tens | Poles |
|---|---|---|
| 2 | 28 | 4 |
- Statistics up to date as of August 13, 2016.

Championship titles
- 2025 2014–15 2004 2002: TCR Brazil; Formula E British Formula 3 Formula Three Sudamericana

Awards
- 2003 Autosport National Racing Driver of the Year; 2012 NASCAR Camping World Truck Series Most Popular Driver
Medal record
Representing Brazil
Summer X Games
| Bronze medal – third place | 2014 Austin | RallyCross |

Nelson Ângelo Tamsma Piquet Souto Maior (born July 25, 1985), also known as Nelson Piquet Jr. or Nelsinho Piquet, is a Brazilian stock car racing driver and former Formula One and Formula E driver where he was champion in the 2014–15 season. He currently competes full-time in the Brazilian Stock Car Pro Series, driving the No. 33 Toyota Corolla E210 for Motul TMG Racing.

Piquet also races a ORECA 07 in the LMP2 Pro/Am class of the European Le Mans Series for Team Virage.

The son of three-time Formula One world champion Nelson Piquet, he was signed as test driver for Renault Formula One team for the 2007 season, and was promoted to the race team for 2008, before being dropped midway through the 2009 season. After losing his drive, it emerged that he had, under instruction from senior members of the team, crashed deliberately at the 2008 Singapore Grand Prix to help his teammate, Fernando Alonso, win the race. The resulting scandal became one of the most significant in motor sport history, and ultimately saw a permanent end to Piquet Jr's career in Formula 1. Piquet also finished runner-up in the 2006 GP2 Series, fourth in the 2014 Global RallyCross Championship, and seventh in the 2012 NASCAR Truck Series.

== Early and personal life ==
Piquet born in Heidelberg, West Germany, is the son of Nelson Piquet, one of Brazil's most successful Formula One drivers as a three-time world champion. Piquet's parents separated soon after he was born, and he lived in Monaco with his Dutch mother, Sylvia Tamsma, until he was eight years old. He then moved to live in Brazil with his father. "They kind of swapped me. My mother wanted me to get to know my father, she wanted me to know Brazil and the language, and she realized life in Brazil would be better for a child." Piquet has two sisters, Kelly and Julia, and four half-brothers, Geraldo, Laszlo, Pedro, and Marco. He lived in Brasília and attended the American School of Brasília until he was 16 years old, when he decided to pursue his racing career full-time.

In December 2023, Piquet married Brazilian model and professional equestrian Patsy Zurita.

== Early career ==
Piquet's racing career started in 1993 in Brazilian karting, where he would stay until 2001 when he moved to Formula Three Sudamericana. His father's wealth enabled him to race for his own team, a practice he continued until he left GP2 Series. He raced in part of the 2001 season there, staying for 2002 winning the championship with four races to go. In 2002, he also raced one race of Brazilian Formula Renault.

In 2003, Piquet moved to the United Kingdom where he joined the British Formula 3 Championship and formed the Piquet Sports team. He went on to finish the championship in third place with six wins, five podiums and eight pole positions. A test with the Williams Formula One team followed.

Piquet then went on to win the 2004 British Formula 3 Championship. He became the youngest driver to have ever won the championship at nineteen years and two months. He also did further running for Williams.

In 2005, Piquet took part in the A1 Grand Prix for A1 Team Brazil, winning both the Sprint and Main races at the first event of the season at Brands Hatch, as well as scoring a point for the fastest lap. He also drove for the Hitech Piquet Sports in the GP2 Series, winning his first race at Spa-Francorchamps in Belgium, and tested for the BAR-Honda Formula One team.

In 2006, Piquet took second place in the championship behind British driver Lewis Hamilton in his second year of GP2.

== Formula One (2007–2009) ==
=== 2007 ===
During the 2007 season, Piquet was the official test and reserve driver for the Renault Formula One team.

=== 2008 ===
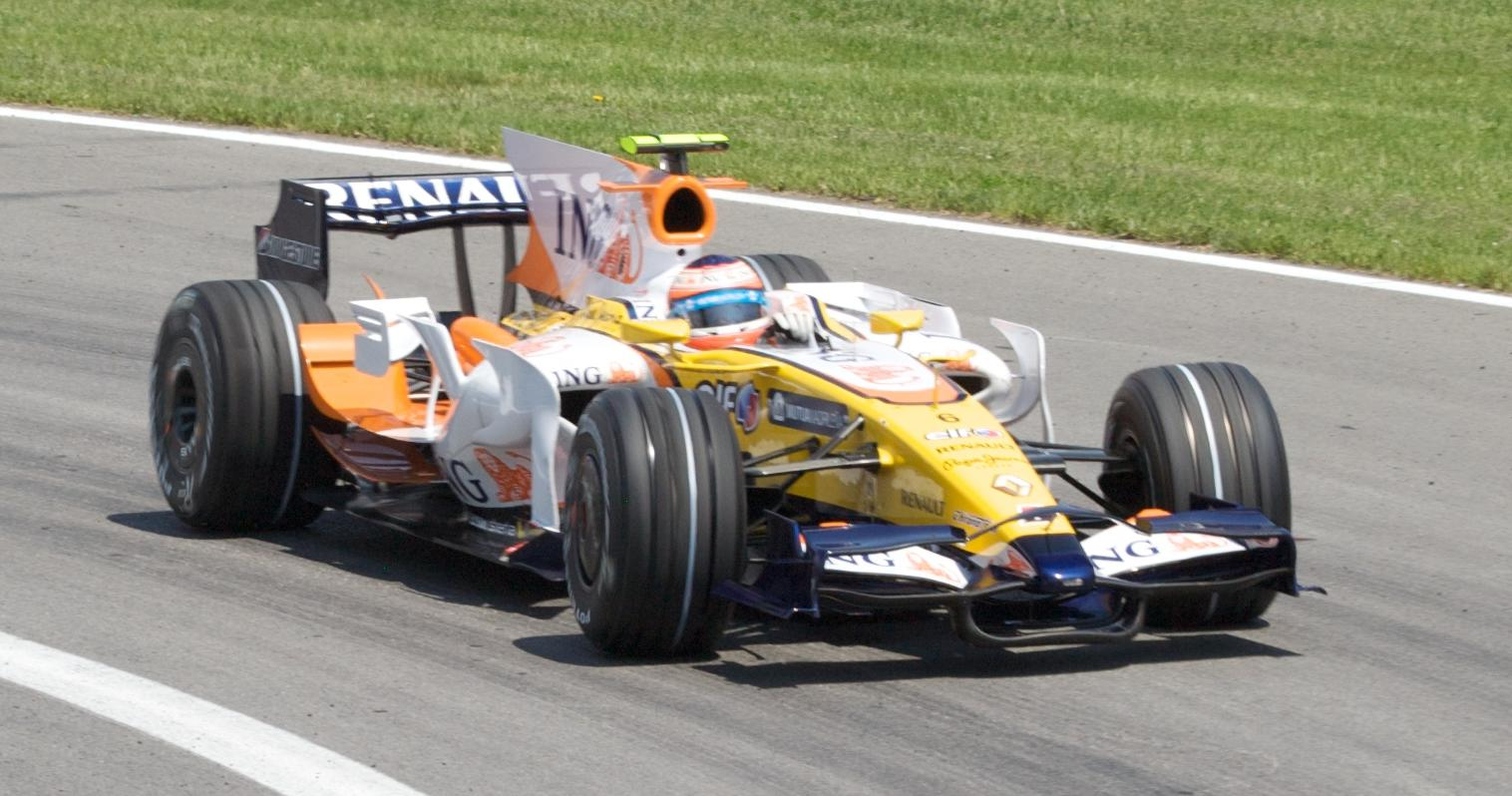
Piquet driving for Renault at the 2008 Canadian Grand Prix

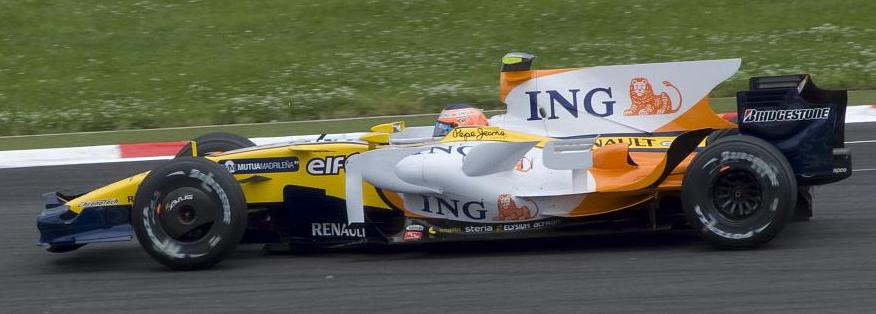
Piquet scored the first points of his F1 career at the 2008 French Grand Prix.

The 2008 season saw Piquet promoted to the Renault Formula One race team to drive alongside returning double World Champion Fernando Alonso. It was reported that he gained preference for the seat over Heikki Kovalainen because Kovalainen was seen as a potential rival to Alonso, and such a challenge to Alonso could damage the team.

The first race of the 2008 season in Australia saw Piquet start 21st and damage his car in a collision on the opening lap, before ultimately retiring on lap 31. This was exactly the same result as his father achieved in his first race at the 1978 German Grand Prix. At the Malaysian Grand Prix, he started from thirteenth on the grid and finished eleventh. He started the Bahrain Grand Prix from fourteenth but retired with a gearbox problem after his second pit stop. Piquet qualified in tenth for the Spanish Grand Prix in Barcelona, taking part in the first top-ten qualifying session of his career. However, his race ended on lap seven after colliding with Sébastien Bourdais in an attempt to overtake. The Turkish Grand Prix saw him qualify seventeenth and finish the race fifteenth. His problems were further compounded with a pair of non-finishes, when he crashed out at Monaco after failing to get to grips with the damp conditions, and spun off while chasing teammate Alonso in Canada, before ultimately retiring on lap 42 with brake failure.

Piquet was under increasing pressure from his Renault team over the course of the 2008 season, and there was speculation he would lose his race seat if he did not improve. Renault did nothing to quell the rumours, publicly urging him to improve after the Turkish Grand Prix and suggesting after Monaco that he lacked confidence. Despite the pressure, Piquet scored his first points in F1 with a seventh place finish at the 2008 French Grand Prix passing his twice-World Champion teammate Fernando Alonso in the last few laps. In the British Grand Prix at Silverstone, Piquet was at one point lying in fourth place, having passed his teammate who was on old tyres. Piquet aquaplaned and spun out on lap 36 along with several other top runners as the wet conditions reached their worst. A race later, however, at the German Grand Prix, he finished ahead of the Ferrari of Felipe Massa to claim second place to McLaren's Lewis Hamilton and his first podium finish. He had been the only driver on a one-stop strategy which, with the help of a safety car segment, gained him several positions. In the Japanese Grand Prix, he finished fourth.

=== 2009 ===
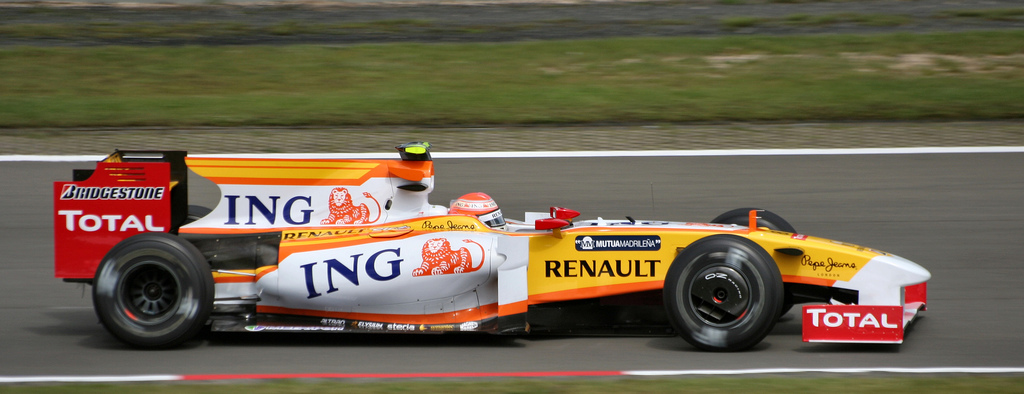
Piquet at the 2009 German Grand Prix

Despite rumours that he was on his way out, Renault decided to keep Piquet by signing him to a one-year contract. Alonso continued as his teammate, hoping to elevate Renault into title contention once again.

Piquet had a disappointing start to the 2009 season, failing to make past the first qualifying session in any of the first three races. His first race, in Australia, ended on lap 24 when he retired with brake failure. He had a better race in Malaysia the following week finishing thirteenth, two places and seven seconds behind his teammate Alonso after the race was cut short due to extreme weather. China was another disappointment, however, and after spinning several times and requiring two new nose cones for his car he eventually finished sixteenth and last, two laps down, in what team manager Flavio Briatore described as a "very, very bad race". He had a better race at Bahrain on his way to tenth making up one of the highest number of places behind Webber, whom he held off at the end of the race. In Spain he finished twelfth.

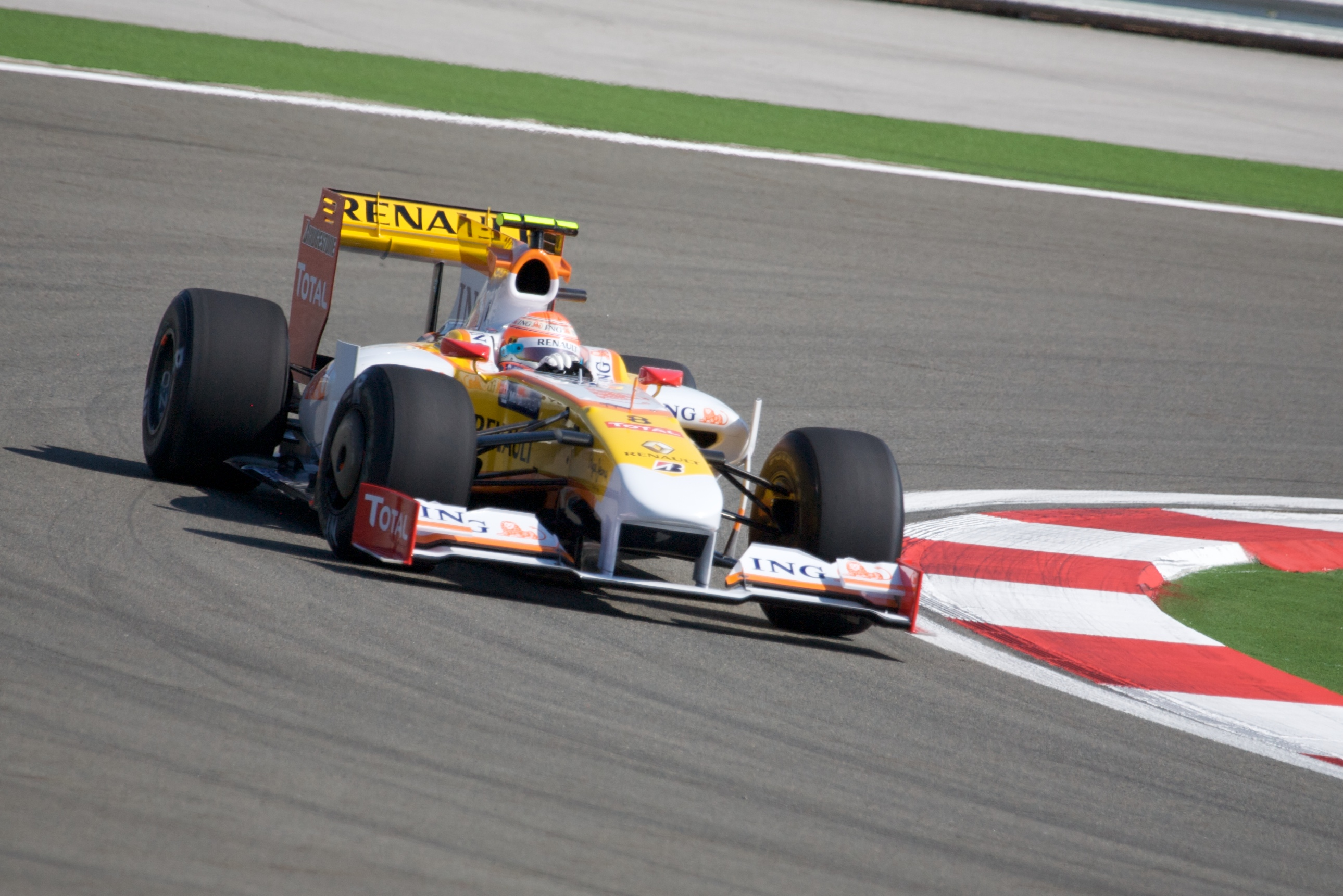
Piquet at the 2009 Turkish Grand Prix

Later, at the 2009 German Grand Prix, Piquet out-qualified his teammate for the first time. However, following the 2009 Hungarian Grand Prix, he still had not scored any points in the 2009 season. On 3 August 2009, Piquet confirmed that he had been dropped by Renault. He hit out hard at his former manager and team boss Flavio Briatore calling him his 'executioner' and questioning Briatore's general Formula One knowledge. Piquet also said the Renault boss favoured teammate Fernando Alonso. Renault's test and reserve driver Romain Grosjean replaced Piquet for the rest of the season. Along with several other drivers, Piquet was linked to a drive with Ferrari as a replacement for the injured Felipe Massa, after stand-in Luca Badoer finished second-to-last at the European Grand Prix. However, Ferrari instead signed Giancarlo Fisichella who Piquet had replaced at Renault in 2008.

=== 2009 FIA investigation: "Crashgate" ===
In August 2009, after Piquet left the Renault F1 team, allegations surfaced that Piquet had deliberately crashed his car at the 2008 Singapore Grand Prix, to benefit his teammate Fernando Alonso, who went on to win the race. At the time, Piquet characterized the crash as a simple mistake. Later, he recanted, making statements to the Fédération Internationale de l'Automobile (FIA) that it was deliberate, and that he had been asked by Renault team principal Flavio Briatore and engineer Pat Symonds to stage the crash. In return for his evidence, Piquet was granted blanket immunity by the FIA. On 4 September 2009, Renault F1 principals were charged with conspiracy and race rigging, and were called to face the FIA World Motor Sport Council in Paris on 21 September 2009.

On 11 September, Renault and Briatore stated they would initiate a criminal case against Piquet for making false allegations and blackmail. However, on 16 September, Renault announced they would not contest the charges, and that both Briatore and Symonds had left the team.

On 21 September, on conclusion of the FIA hearings, Piquet, who was 23 at the time of the 2008 Singapore GP, said "I bitterly regret my actions to follow the orders I was given... My situation at Renault turned into a nightmare. Having dreamed of being a Formula One driver and having worked so hard to get there, I found myself at the mercy of Mr Briatore. His true character, which had previously only been known to those he had treated like this in the past, is now known. Mr Briatore was my manager as well as the team boss, he had my future in his hands but he cared nothing for it. By the time of the Singapore GP he had isolated me and driven me to the lowest point I had ever reached in my life. Now that I am out of that situation I cannot believe that I agreed to the plan, but when it was put to me I felt that I was in no position to refuse." Renault accused Piquet of 'false allegations' and even produced an anonymous "Witness X" who supposedly provided first-hand details of the conspiracy planning, which backed up Pat Symonds' claim that the idea for the crash came from Piquet himself as a way to atone for poor performance and aid in his negotiations for a contract extension with the team.

However, in December 2010, the Piquets won a libel case against Renault. Renault apologised to Piquet for defaming him and paid substantial damages. The Piquets' lawyer said "They were both treated appallingly by Renault F1 when they dared to reveal the scandal to the governing body... F1 has been deprived of the best of Nelsinho and it is to [F1's] detriment that his talent is now being demonstrated elsewhere." Renault issued an apology in response to the High Court decision: "The team accepts that the allegations made by Nelson Piquet Jr. were not false. "It also accepts that Piquet Jr. and his father did not invent these allegations in order to blackmail the team."

On 15 October 2009, Felipe Massa was reported as saying he was "certain" Alonso was involved in the scandal, adding, "Without a doubt he knew it." Six weeks later, it was reported that Alonso turned down Massa's charity kart race invitation.

A few hours after the new Campos Meta team had confirmed Bruno Senna as one of its drivers for 2010, F1 chief executive Bernie Ecclestone said in the paddock of the new Yas Marina Circuit that he would like to see the sacked Piquet get another chance in F1 as Senna's teammate. Ecclestone said "It'd be good, wouldn't it, another good name. That's what's being talked about, actually."

On December 28, 2009, it was reported by Spanish website Motor21.com that Piquet had signed a three-year contract with Campos alongside Senna. However, this was later revealed by Motor21.com to have been a hoax in celebration of the Spanish Día de los Santos Innocentes festival. Piquet hinted that he had had talks with Force India. However, they opted to retain both Adrian Sutil and Vitantonio Liuzzi, so Piquet decided to move to NASCAR for 2010. Several months later, Piquet said that he had had talks with more than one F1 team to race again after the Crashgate controversy.

== NASCAR (2010–2014, 2016, 2026) ==
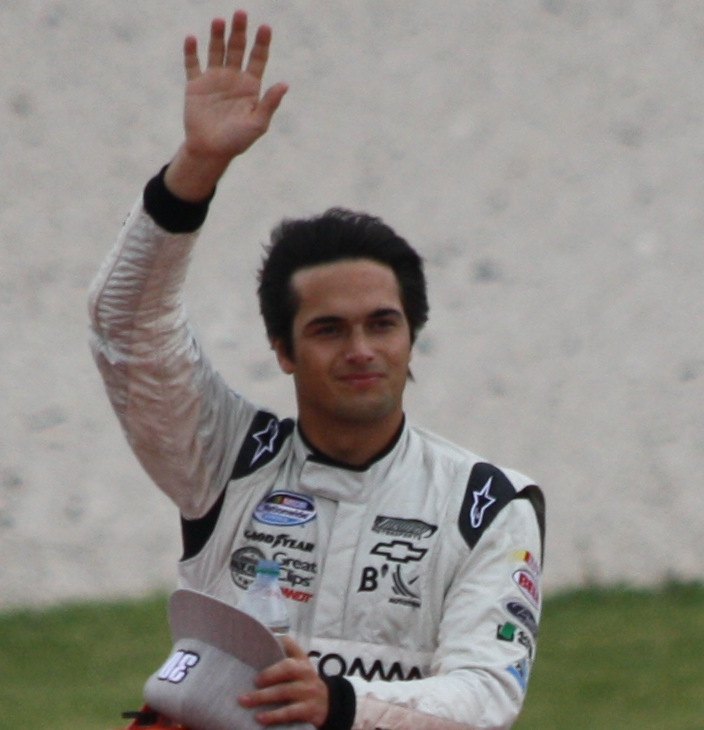
Piquet at Road America in 2012

Piquet told Brazilian Rede Globo that he would test a NASCAR Camping World Truck Series truck for Red Horse Racing from Rockingham Speedway in North Carolina on October 12, 2009. When asked whether the test could lead to a NASCAR drive next season, Piquet said it was not the plan.

However, Piquet announced that he would race in NASCAR in 2010—albeit without specifying which series—during the following January. Piquet drove in the Camping World Truck Series with Red Horse Racing, and made his stock car debut in the ARCA RE/MAX Series at Daytona International Speedway driving the No. 6 Toyota for ARCA powerhouse Eddie Sharp Racing. In his first truck race, Piquet finished sixth, the first Brazilian driver to finish in the top-ten in the series' history. Piquet then announced that he would compete in three races for Billy Ballew Motorsports driving the No. 15 truck. In August, he competed in the NASCAR Nationwide Series race at the Watkins Glen International road course and finished seventh in his first start in the series.

On December 13, 2010, Kevin Harvick, Inc. announced that Piquet would drive a third truck for the team for the full 2011 Truck series season, the No. 8 Chevrolet with Chris Carrier as crew chief. Piquet finished tenth in points and was a finalist for Most Popular Driver and runner-up to Joey Coulter for Rookie of the Year.

Piquet signed with Turner Motorsports for 2012 after KHI folded. That year he drove the No. 30 Chevrolet for the full season in the Camping World Truck Series, and drove part-time in the Nationwide Series.

Piquet scored his first win in a NASCAR-sanctioned series in March at Bristol Motor Speedway, winning his first-ever K&N Pro Series East start.

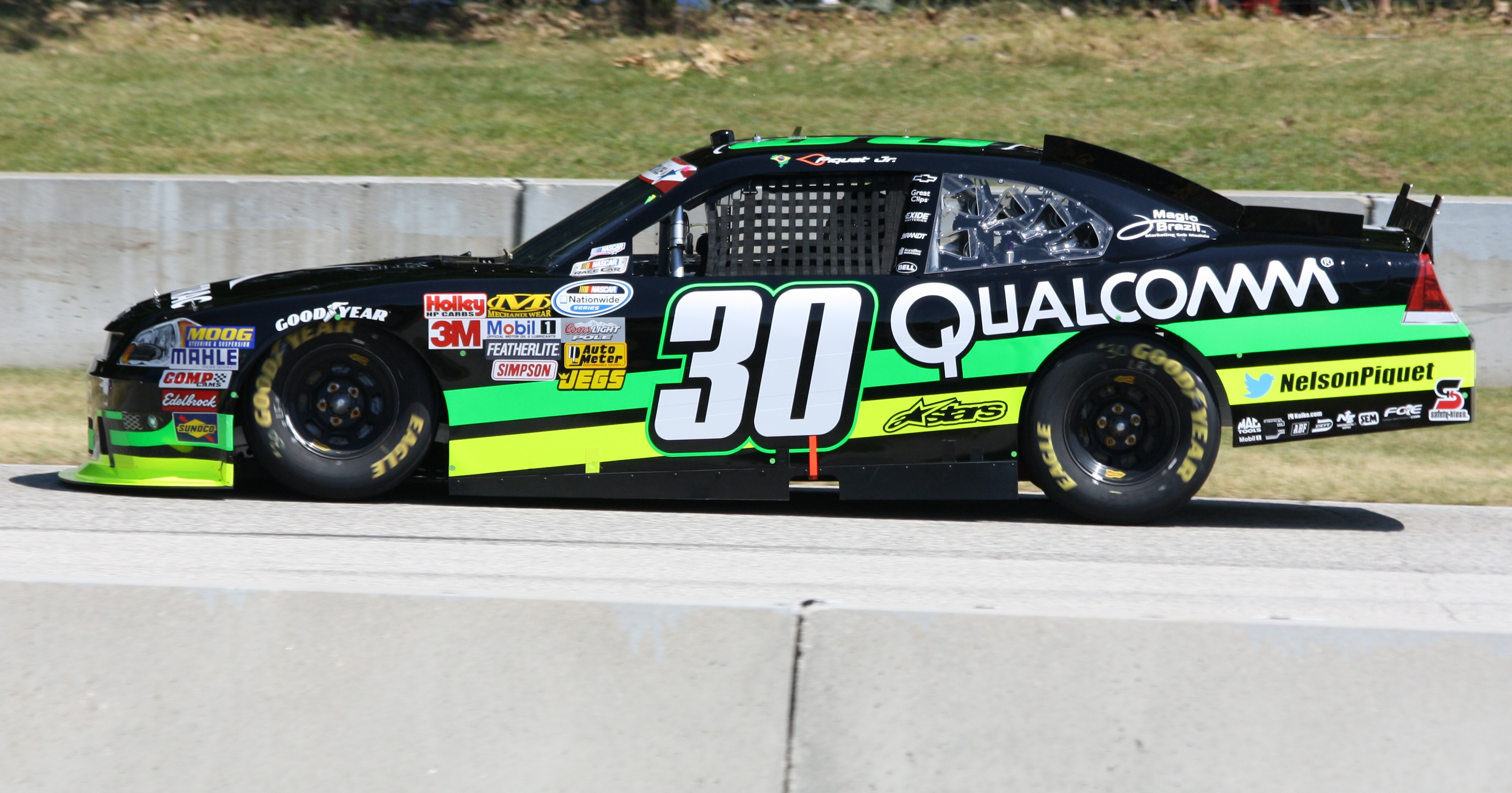
Piquet at his first NASCAR Nationwide Series win at Road America in 2012.

On June 23, 2012, Piquet scored his first win in NASCAR competition, winning the Nationwide Series Sargento 200 at Road America; he was the first Brazilian driver to win a NASCAR national touring series event.

On August 18, 2012, Piquet won his first race in the Camping World Truck Series at Michigan. On lap 56 of the race he spun out racing Kurt Busch after a restart. The team pitted under the caution and it allowed them to use fuel strategy later in the race to obtain their first win of the season. On September 29, 2012, Piquet won his second career Camping World Truck Series race at Las Vegas Motor Speedway after making a last lap pass on Matt Crafton.

In 2013, Piquet moved to full-time competition in the Nationwide Series, driving the No. 30 for Turner Scott Motorsports in a bid for Rookie of the Year. He also drove in selected Truck Series races for the team, and in the Truck Series finale at Homestead-Miami Speedway for NTS Motorsports.

Late in the 2013 season, Piquet was fined $10,000 and placed on indefinite probation by NASCAR after making a remark described as a homophobic slur on social media.

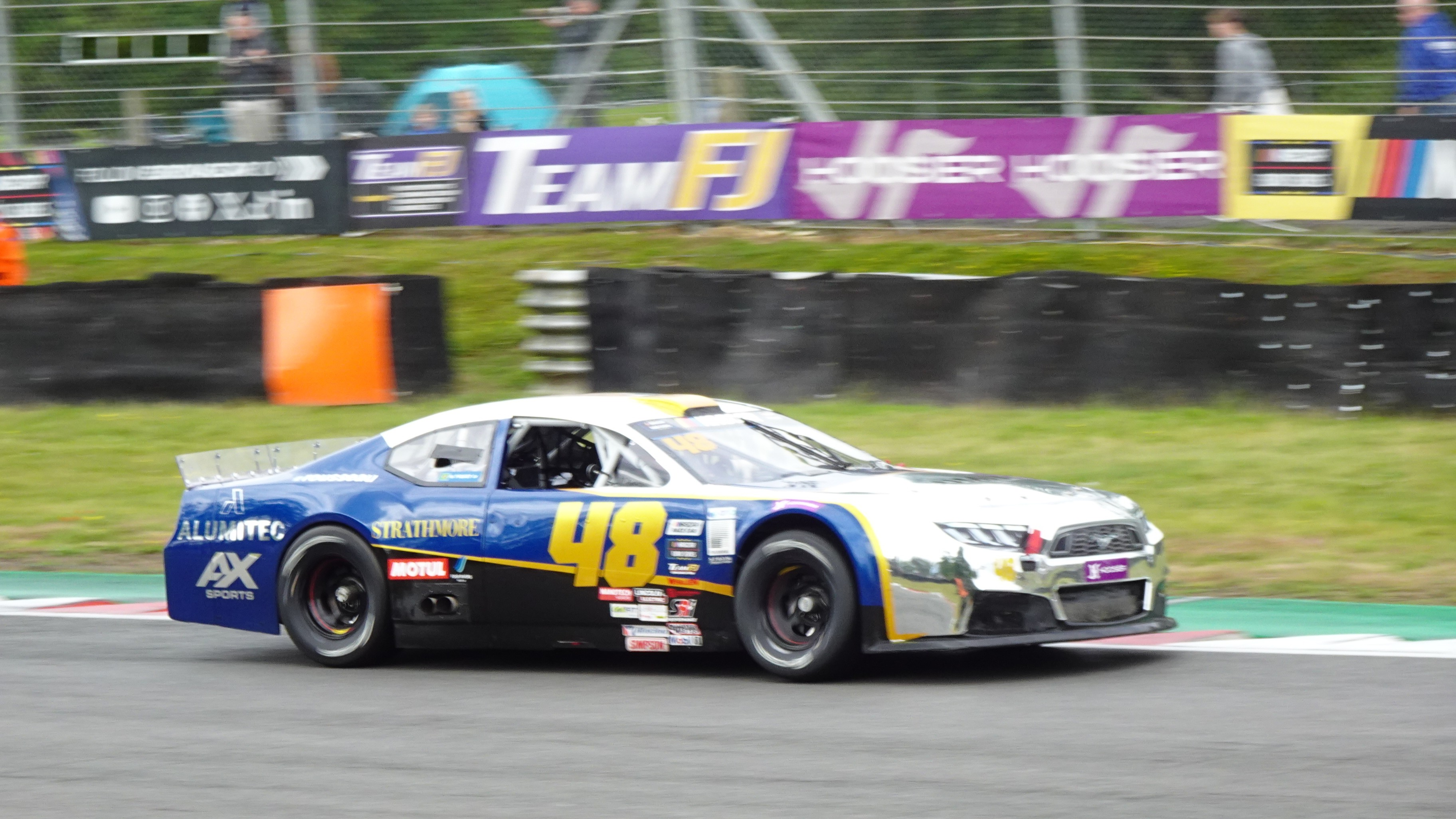
Piquet at Brands Hatch in 2026

In 2014, Piquet was hired by Randy Humphrey Racing to race the No. 77 Ford in the Sprint Cup Series' Cheez-It 355 at The Glen at Watkins Glen International, which would be his debut in the series.

Two years later, Piquet returned to the Nationwide Series, now known as the Xfinity Series, driving the No. 98 Ford for Biagi-DenBeste Racing at Mid-Ohio Sports Car Course.

Piquet has returned to racing in NASCAR in 2026, in the 2026 NASCAR Euro Series, driving the no. 48 Ford Mustang entry for Alumitec Racing.

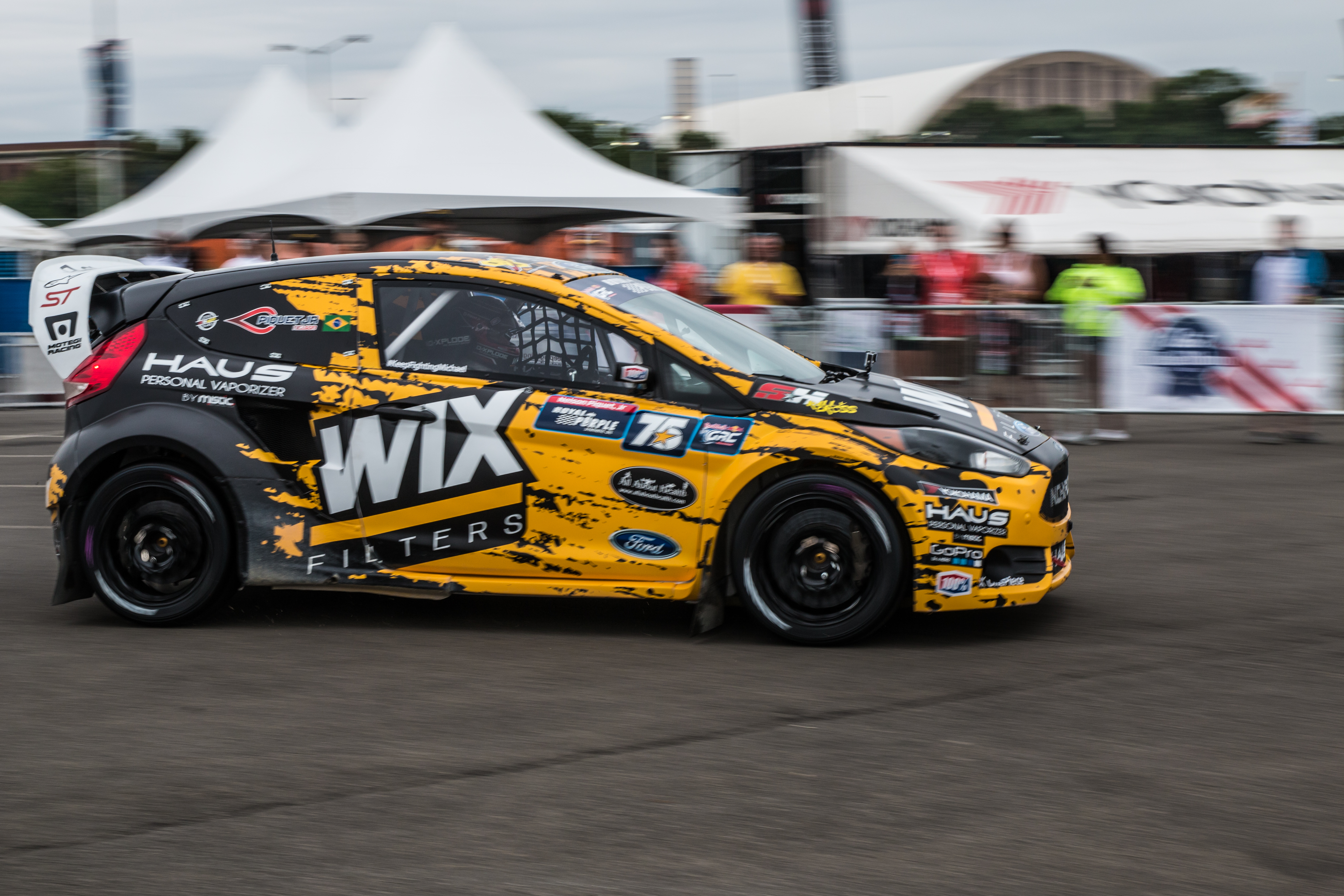
Piquet competing at the RFK Stadium during the 2014 Global RallyCross Championship.

== Rallycross ==
Released by Turner Scott Motorsports due to a lack of sponsorship following the 2013 season, in April 2014 it was announced that Piquet would contest the 2014 Global RallyCross Championship with SH Racing, driving the No. 07 Ford Fiesta ST. He collected four podiums in nine races, and finished the season in fourth place in the championship standings.

== Formula E (2014–2019) ==
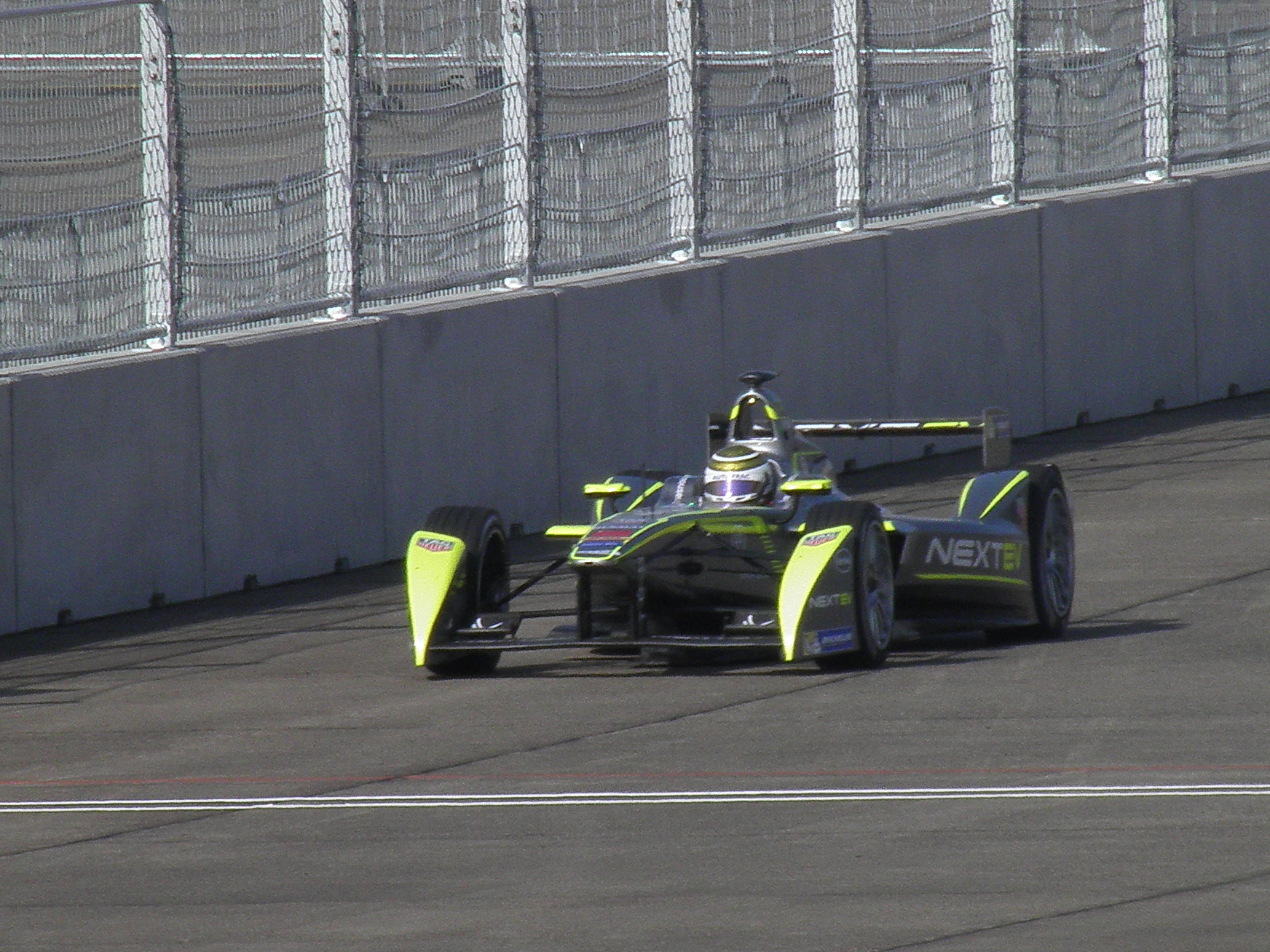
Piquet racing in the 2015 Berlin ePrix

=== China Racing/NEXTEV (2014–2017) ===
In August 2014, Piquet tested at Donington Park with Formula E team China Racing, and was hired by the team on August 21. In the first five races of the 2014–15 season, Piquet achieved podium finishes in Punta del Este, and Buenos Aires. Piquet achieved his first Formula E victory in Long Beach, and his second in Moscow which, coupled with his consistent results across the season, meant Piquet won the inaugural Formula E Championship by a solitary point from Sébastien Buemi.

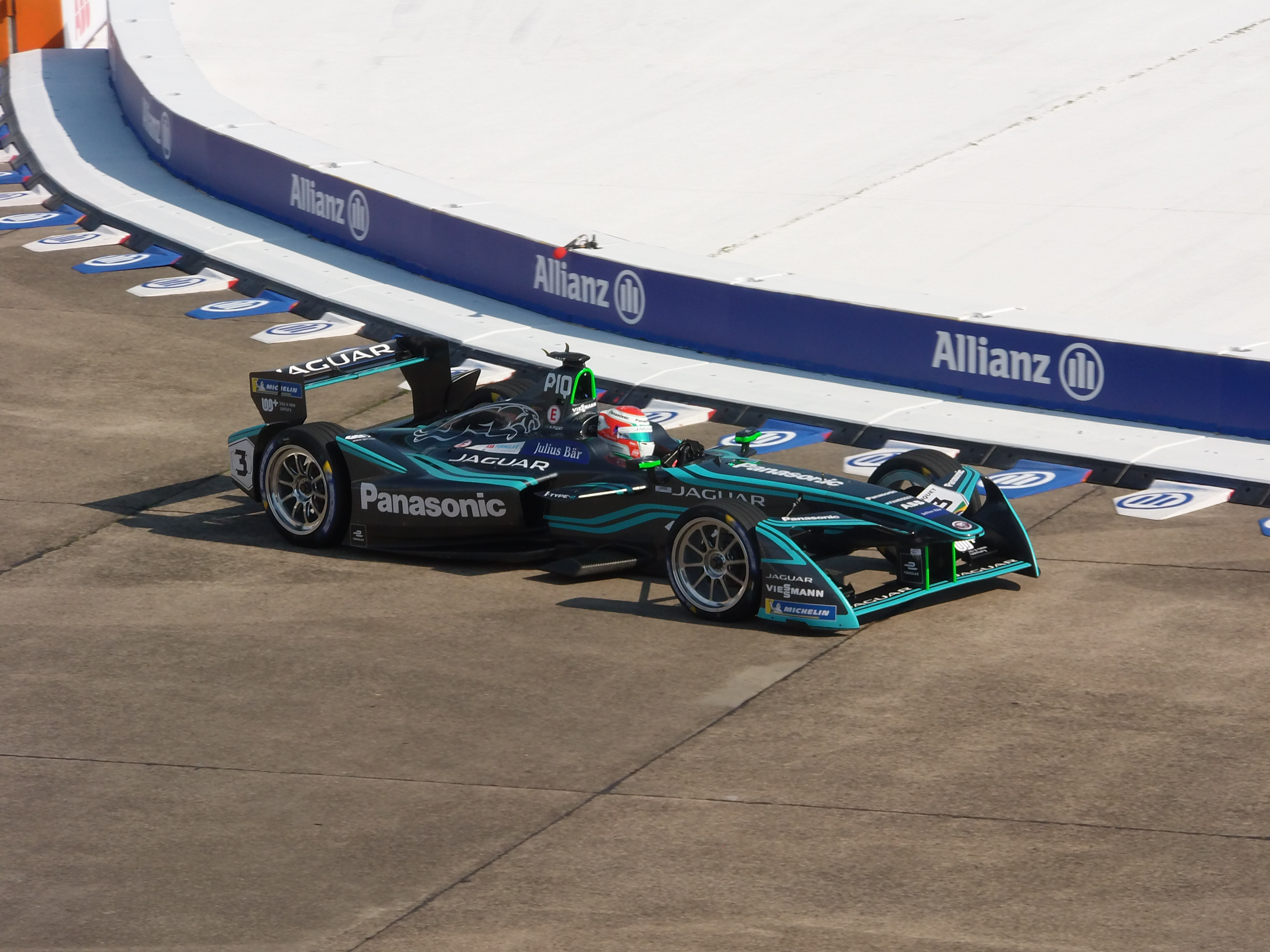
Piquet Jr. driving at the 2018 Berlin ePrix.

=== Jaguar (2017–2019) ===
In 2017, Piquet joined the Panasonic Jaguar Racing after two frustrating seasons with NextEV.

Piquet was outmatched by his teammate Mitch Evans every ePrix in 2018-19 season, he only scored one point in that season. He left the Jaguar team after Sanya ePrix. He was replaced by Alex Lynn, for the remainder of the season.

== Racing record ==
=== Career summary ===
| Season | Series | Team | Races | Wins | Poles | Points | Position |
|---|---|---|---|---|---|---|---|
| 2001 | Formula 3 Sudamericana | Piquet Sports | 7 | 1 | 1 | 77 | 5th |
| 2002 | Formula 3 Sudamericana | Piquet Sports | 17 | 13 | 16 | 296 | **1st** |
| 2003 | British Formula 3 Championship | Piquet Sports | 23 | 6 | 8 | 231 | **3rd** |
| 2003 | Masters of Formula 3 | Piquet Sports | 1 | 0 | 1 | N/A | **2nd** |
| 2003 | Macau Grand Prix | Hitech Racing | 1 | 0 | 0 | N/A | 8th |
| 2003 | F3 Korea Super Prix | Hitech Racing | 1 | 0 | 0 | N/A | **3rd** |
| 2004 | British Formula 3 Championship | Piquet Sports | 24 | 6 | 5 | 282 | **1st** |
| 2004 | European Formula 3 Cup | Piquet Sports | 1 | 0 | 1 | N/A | 4th |
| 2004 | Macau Grand Prix | Piquet Sports | 1 | 0 | 0 | N/A | 10th |
| 2004 | Masters of Formula 3 | Piquet Sports | 1 | 0 | 0 | N/A | 8th |
| 2004 | Bahrain F3 Superprix | Piquet Sports | 1 | 0 | 0 | N/A | NC |
| 2004 | Porsche Supercup | Porsche AG | 1 | 0 | 0 | 0 | NC |
| 2005 | GP2 Series | Hitech Piquet Sports | 22 | 0 | 0 | 46 | 8th |
| 2005–06 | A1 Grand Prix | A1 Team Brazil | 14 | 2 | 2 | 71^{†} | 6th^{†} |
| 2006 | GP2 Series | Piquet Sports | 21 | 4 | 6 | 102 | **2nd** |
| 2006 | 24 Hours of Le Mans - GT1 | Russian Age Racing | 1 | 0 | 0 | N/A | 4th |
| 2006 | Mil Milhas Brasil - GTP1 | Cirtek Motorsport | 1 | 1 | 0 | N/A | **1st** |
| 2008 | Formula One | ING Renault F1 Team | 18 | 0 | 0 | 19 | 12th |
| 2009 | Formula One | ING Renault F1 Team | 10 | 0 | 0 | 0 | 21st |
| 2010 | NASCAR Nationwide Series | Baker Curb Racing | 1 | 0 | 0 | 146 | 102nd |
| 2010 | NASCAR Camping World Truck Series | Red Horse Racing | 1 | 0 | 0 | 644 | 44th |
| 2010 | NASCAR Camping World Truck Series | Billy Ballew Motorsports | 3 | 0 | 0 | 644 | 44th |
| 2010 | ARCA Racing Series | Eddie Sharp Racing | 3 | 0 | 1 | 450 | 50th |
| 2010 | Copa Chevrolet Montana | M4T Motorsport | 1 | 0 | 0 | N/A | NC |
| 2011 | NASCAR Camping World Truck Series | Kevin Harvick Incorporated | 25 | 0 | 0 | 752 | 10th |
| 2011 | NASCAR Nationwide Series | Turner Motorsports | 1 | 0 | 0 | N/A | 124th |
| 2012 | NASCAR Camping World Truck Series | Turner Motorsports | 22 | 2 | 3 | 747 | 7th |
| 2012 | NASCAR Nationwide Series | Turner Motorsports | 2 | 1 | 1 | N/A | 104th |
| 2013 | NASCAR Nationwide Series | Turner Scott Motorsports | 33 | 0 | 0 | 861 | 12th |
| 2013 | NASCAR Camping World Truck Series | NTS Motorsports | 1 | 0 | 0 | 0 | 100th‡ |
| 2013 | NASCAR Camping World Truck Series | Turner Scott Motorsports | 1 | 0 | 0 | 0 | 100th‡ |
| 2013 | Global RallyCross Championship | X Team Racing | 4 | 0 | 0 | 17 | 19th |
| 2014 | Global RallyCross Championship | SH Racing | 10 | 0 | 0 | 307 | 4th |
| 2014 | Blancpain Sprint Series | BMW Sport Trophy Team Brasil | 8 | 0 | 0 | 4 | 37th |
| 2014 | NASCAR Sprint Cup Series | Randy Humphrey Racing | 1 | 0 | 0 | 18 | 53rd |
| 2014 | World Rallycross Championship - RX Lites | Olsbergs MSE | 1 | 0 | 0 | 18 | 20th |
| 2014 | Stock Car Brasil | Mobil Super Racing | 1 | 0 | 0 | 0 | NC‡ |
| 2014–15 | Formula E | China Racing | 11 | 2 | 0 | 144 | **1st** |
| 2015 | Global RallyCross Championship | SH Racing Rallycross | 12 | 1 | 0 | 380 | 4th |
| 2015 | Indy Lights | Carlin | 2 | 0 | 1 | 28 | 15th |
| 2015 | Stock Car Brasil | AMG Motorsport | 1 | 0 | 1 | 0 | NC‡ |
| 2015–16 | Formula E | NEXTEV TCR | 10 | 0 | 0 | 8 | 15th |
| 2016 | FIA World Endurance Championship | Rebellion Racing | 3 | 0 | 0 | 25 | 15th |
| 2016 | 24 Hours of Le Mans | Rebellion Racing | 1 | 0 | 0 | N/A | 29th |
| 2016 | Global RallyCross Championship | SH Rallycross | 3 | 0 | 0 | 63 | 12th |
| 2016 | NASCAR Xfinity Series | Biagi-DenBeste Racing | 1 | 0 | 0 | 3 | 83rd |
| 2016 | Stock Car Brasil | Shell Racing | 1 | 0 | 0 | 0 | NC‡ |
| 2016–17 | Formula E | NextEV NIO | 12 | 0 | 1 | 33 | 11th |
| 2017 | FIA World Endurance Championship - LMP2 | Vaillante Rebellion | 8 | 0 | 1 | 73 | 12th |
| 2017 | 24 Hours of Le Mans - LMP2 | Vaillante Rebellion | 1 | 0 | 0 | N/A | DSQ |
| 2017 | International GT Open | BMW Team Teo Martín | 2 | 0 | 0 | 8 | 28th |
| 2017–18 | Formula E | Panasonic Jaguar Racing | 12 | 0 | 0 | 51 | 9th |
| 2018 | Stock Car Brasil | Full Time Bassani | 19 | 0 | 0 | 65 | 15th |
| 2018–19 | Formula E | Panasonic Jaguar Racing | 6 | 0 | 0 | 1 | 22nd |
| 2019 | Stock Car Brasil | Full Time Sports | 21 | 0 | 0 | 163 | 13th |
| 2019 | TitansRX International Europe Series | N/A | 4 | 0 | 0 | 22 | 18th |
| 2020 | Stock Car Brasil | Full Time Bassani | 18 | 1 | 0 | 224 | 7th |
| 2020 | Porsche Endurance Series | ? | 3 | 1 | 0 | 192 | **2nd** |
| 2021 | Stock Car Brasil | MX Piquet Sports | 13 | 0 | 0 | 24 | 30th |
| 2021 | Porsche All-Star Race Brasil | N/A | 1 | 0 | 0 | N/A | 14th |
| 2022 | Stock Car Pro Series | Motul TMG Racing | 22 | 2 | 0 | 232 | 8th |
| 2022 | Lamborghini Super Trofeo North America - Pro | Ansa Motorsports | 8 | 2 | 1 | 76 | 5th |
| 2023 | Stock Car Pro Series | Crown Racing/TMG | 22 | 0 | 0 | 191 | 14th |
| 2023 | European Le Mans Series - LMP2 Pro-Am | United Autosports USA | 5 | 0 | 0 | 40 | 8th |
| 2023 | TC2000 Championship | Toyota Gazoo Racing YPF Infinia | 1 | 0 | 0 | 0 | NC‡ |
| 2024 | Stock Car Pro Series | Cavaleiro Sports | 24 | 0 | 0 | 591 | 19th |
| 2024 | European Le Mans Series - LMP2 Pro-Am | Team Virage | 3 | 0 | 0 | 18 | 13th |
| 2024 | TCR World Tour | Squadra Martino | 2 | 0 | 0 | 6 | 29th |
| 2024 | TCR South America Touring Car Championship | Squadra Martino | 2 | 0 | 0 | 48 | 26th |
| 2024 | TCR Brazil Touring Car Championship | Squadra Martino | 2 | 0 | 0 | 48 | 15th |
| 2025 | Stock Car Pro Series | Scuderia Bandeiras Sports | 23 | 2 | 1 | 713 | 6th |
| 2026 | Stock Car Pro Series | Scuderia Bandeiras | 10 | 2 | 1 | 380 | 19th* |
| 2026 | Stock Car Pro Series | Full Time Racing | 1 | 0 | 0 | 380 | 19th* |
| 2026 | TCR South America Touring Car Championship | Honda Racing | 3 | 0 | 0 | 46 | 16th* |
| 2026 | NASCAR Euro Series - V8GP | Alumitec Racing | 12 | 2 | 1 | 480 | **3rd** |
| 2026 | Porsche Carrera Cup Brasil | | | | | | |

^{†} Includes points scored by other Team Brazil drivers.
^{‡} Ineligible for championship points
^{*} Season still in progress.

=== Complete Formula Three Sudamericana results ===
(key) (Races in bold indicate pole position; races in italics indicate fastest lap)

| Year | Entrant | Chassis | Engine | 1 | 2 | 3 | 4 | 5 | 6 | 7 | 8 | 9 | 10 | 11 | 12 | 13 | 14 | 15 | 16 | 17 | 18 | DC | Points |
|---|---|---|---|---|---|---|---|---|---|---|---|---|---|---|---|---|---|---|---|---|---|---|---|
| 2001 | Piquet Sports | Dallara F301 | Mugen-Honda | PAR | LON | BUE | MDA | BRA1; 2 | FOR; 2 | CAM; 12 | PIR; 14 | RCU; 3 | **CAS**; 1 | BRA2; 2 | | | | | | | | 5th | 77 |
| 2002 | Piquet Sports | Dallara F301 | Mugen-Honda | **LON**; **1**; 1 | **LON**; **2** Ret | **PAR**; **1**; 1 | **PAR**; **2**; 2 | CUR; 1; 6 | **CUR**; **2**; 1 | **CAM**; **1**; 1 | **CAM**; **2**; 1 | **FOR**; **1**; 1 | **FOR**; **2**; 1 | **OBE**; **1**; 1 | **OBE**; **2**; 1 | **RDJ**; **1**; 1 | RDJ; 2; 2 | **CAS**; **1**; 1 | **CAS**; **2**; 1 | **BRA**; **1**; 1 | **BRA**; **2** Ret | 1st | 296 |

=== Complete British Formula Three Championship results ===
(key) (Races in bold indicate pole position; races in italics indicate fastest lap)

| Year | Entrant | Chassis | Engine | 1 | 2 | 3 | 4 | 5 | 6 | 7 | 8 | 9 | 10 | 11 | 12 | 13 | 14 | 15 | 16 | 17 | 18 | 19 | 20 | 21 | 22 | 23 | 24 | 25 | DC | Points |
|---|---|---|---|---|---|---|---|---|---|---|---|---|---|---|---|---|---|---|---|---|---|---|---|---|---|---|---|---|---|---|
| 2003 | Piquet Sports | Dallara F303 | Mugen-Honda | DON1; 1 EX | DON1; 2; 3 | SNE; 1; 2 | SNE; 2; 5 | CRO; 1; 8 | CRO; 2; 12 | KNO; 1; 2 | **KNO**; **2**; 1 | **SIL**; **1**; 1 | **SIL**; **2**; 6 | CAS; 1; 9 | CAS; 2; 8 | **OUL**; **1** Ret | **OUL**; **2**; 4 | **ROC**; **1**; 1 | ROC; 2; 2 | THR; 1 Ret | THR; 2; 12 | SPA; 1; 3 | SPA; 2; 7 | DON2; 1; 1 | DON2; 2; 6 | **BRH**; **1**; 1 | **BRH**; **2**; 1 | | 3rd | 231 |
| 2004 | Piquet Sports | Dallara F304 | Mugen-Honda | DON; 1; 2 | DON; 2; 2 | SIL; 1; 3 | SIL; 2 C | CRO; 1; 5 | CRO; 2 Ret | KNO; 1; 10 | KNO; 2; 3 | SNE; 1; 1 | SNE; 2; 1 | SNE; 3; 4 | CAS; 1; 7 | CAS; 2 Ret | DON; 1; 6 | DON; 2; 3 | **OUL**; **1**; 1 | **OUL**; **2**; 1 | **SIL**; **1**; 1 | **SIL**; **2**; 4 | THR; 1 Ret | THR; 2; 2 | **SPA**; **1**; 6 | SPA; 2; 4 | **BRH**; **1**; 2 | BRH; 2; 1 | 1st | 282 |

=== Complete GP2 Series results ===
(key) (Races in bold indicate pole position; races in italics indicate fastest lap)

GP2 Series results
| Year | Entrant | 1 | 2 | 3 | 4 | 5 | 6 | 7 | 8 | 9 | 10 | 11 | 12 | 13 | 14 | 15 | 16 | 17 | 18 | 19 | 20 | 21 | 22 | 23 | DC | Points |
|---|---|---|---|---|---|---|---|---|---|---|---|---|---|---|---|---|---|---|---|---|---|---|---|---|---|---|
| 2005 | Hitech Piquet Sports | IMO; FEA; 14† | IMO; SPR; 6 | CAT; FEA; 5 | CAT; SPR; 2 | MON; FEA; 11† | NÜR; FEA; 5 | NÜR; SPR; 3 | MAG; FEA; Ret | MAG; SPR; DSQ | SIL; FEA; DNS | SIL; SPR; Ret | HOC; FEA; 3 | HOC; SPR; 8 | HUN; FEA; 15† | HUN; SPR; 10 | IST; FEA; 4 | IST; SPR; 6 | MNZ; FEA; 3 | MNZ; SPR; Ret | SPA; FEA; 1 | SPA; SPR; 14 | BHR; FEA; Ret | BHR; SPR; 15 | 8th | 46 |
| 2006 | Piquet Sports | **VAL**; **FEA**; 1 | VAL; SPR; 4 | IMO; FEA; 5 | IMO; SPR; 2 | **NÜR**; **FEA**; Ret | NÜR; SPR; 19† | **CAT**; **FEA**; 4 | CAT; SPR; 2 | MON; FEA; 12† | SIL; FEA; 4 | SIL; SPR; 5 | MAG; FEA; 4 | MAG; SPR; 2 | HOC; FEA; 13† | HOC; SPR; DNS | **HUN**; **FEA**; 1 | HUN; SPR; 1 | **IST**; **FEA**; 1 | IST; SPR; 5 | **MNZ**; **FEA**; 2 | MNZ; SPR; 6 | | | 2nd | 102 |

=== Complete A1 Grand Prix results ===
(key) (Races in bold indicate pole position; races in italics indicate fastest lap)

A1 Grand Prix results
| Year | Entrant | 1 | 2 | 3 | 4 | 5 | 6 | 7 | 8 | 9 | 10 | 11 | 12 | 13 | 14 | 15 | 16 | 17 | 18 | 19 | 20 | 21 | 22 | DC | Points |
|---|---|---|---|---|---|---|---|---|---|---|---|---|---|---|---|---|---|---|---|---|---|---|---|---|---|
| 2005–06 | Brazil | **GBR**; **SPR**; 1 | GBR; FEA; 1 | GER; SPR; 3 | GER; FEA; Ret | POR; SPR; 2 | POR; FEA; 8 | AUS; SPR; 3 | AUS; FEA; 9 | MYS; SPR; 4 | MYS; FEA; 10 | UAE; SPR; Ret | UAE; FEA; Ret | RSA; SPR; Ret | RSA; FEA; 9 | IDN; SPR | IDN; FEA | MEX; SPR | MEX; FEA | USA; SPR | USA; FEA | CHN; SPR | CHN; FEA | 6th | 71 |

=== 24 Hours of Le Mans results ===
24 Hours of Le Mans results
| Year | Team | Co-Drivers | Car | Class | Laps | Pos. | Class Pos. |
|---|---|---|---|---|---|---|---|
| 2006 | (Russia) Russian Age Racing (United Kingdom) Team Modena | (Spain) Antonio García (Australia) David Brabham | Aston Martin DBR9 | GT1 | 343 | 9th | 4th |
| 2016 | (Switzerland) Rebellion Racing | (Germany) Nick Heidfeld (France) Nicolas Prost | Rebellion R-One-AER | LMP1 | 330 | 29th | 6th |
| 2017 | (Switzerland) Vaillante Rebellion | (Switzerland) Mathias Beche (Denmark) David Heinemeier Hansson | Oreca 07-Gibson | LMP2 | 364 | DSQ | DSQ |

=== Complete Formula One results ===
(key)

Formula One World Championship results
| Year | Entrant | Chassis | Engine | 1 | 2 | 3 | 4 | 5 | 6 | 7 | 8 | 9 | 10 | 11 | 12 | 13 | 14 | 15 | 16 | 17 | 18 | WDC | Points |
|---|---|---|---|---|---|---|---|---|---|---|---|---|---|---|---|---|---|---|---|---|---|---|---|
| 2008 | ING Renault F1 Team | Renault R28 | Renault RS27 2.4 V8 | AUS; Ret | MAL; 11 | BHR; Ret | ESP; Ret | TUR; 15 | MON; Ret | CAN; Ret | FRA; 7 | GBR; Ret | GER; 2 | HUN; 6 | EUR; 11 | BEL; Ret | ITA; 10 | SIN; Ret | JPN; 4 | CHN; 8 | BRA; Ret | 12th | 19 |
| 2009 | ING Renault F1 Team | Renault R29 | Renault RS27 2.4 V8 | AUS; Ret | MAL; 13 | CHN; 16 | BHR; 10 | ESP; 12 | MON; Ret | TUR; 16 | GBR; 12 | GER; 13 | HUN; 12 | EUR | BEL | ITA | SIN | JPN | BRA | ABU | | 21st | 0 |

=== NASCAR ===
(key) (Bold – Pole position awarded by time. Italics – Pole position earned by points standings. * – Most laps led.)

==== Sprint Cup Series ====
NASCAR Sprint Cup Series results
| Year | Team | No. | Make | 1 | 2 | 3 | 4 | 5 | 6 | 7 | 8 | 9 | 10 | 11 | 12 | 13 | 14 | 15 | 16 | 17 | 18 | 19 | 20 | 21 | 22 | 23 | 24 | 25 | 26 | 27 | 28 | 29 | 30 | 31 | 32 | 33 | 34 | 35 | 36 | NSCSC | Pts | Ref |
|---|---|---|---|---|---|---|---|---|---|---|---|---|---|---|---|---|---|---|---|---|---|---|---|---|---|---|---|---|---|---|---|---|---|---|---|---|---|---|---|---|---|---|
| 2014 | Randy Humphrey Racing | 77 | Ford | DAY | PHO | LVS | BRI | CAL | MAR | TEX | DAR | RCH | TAL | KAN | CLT | DOV | POC | MCH | SON | KEN | DAY | NHA | IND | POC | GLN; 26 | MCH | BRI | ATL | RCH | CHI | NHA | DOV | KAN | CLT | TAL | MAR | TEX | PHO | HOM | 53rd | 18 | |

==== Xfinity Series ====
NASCAR Xfinity Series results
| Year | Team | No. | Make | 1 | 2 | 3 | 4 | 5 | 6 | 7 | 8 | 9 | 10 | 11 | 12 | 13 | 14 | 15 | 16 | 17 | 18 | 19 | 20 | 21 | 22 | 23 | 24 | 25 | 26 | 27 | 28 | 29 | 30 | 31 | 32 | 33 | 34 | 35 | NXSC | Pts | Ref |
|---|---|---|---|---|---|---|---|---|---|---|---|---|---|---|---|---|---|---|---|---|---|---|---|---|---|---|---|---|---|---|---|---|---|---|---|---|---|---|---|---|---|
| 2010 | Baker Curb Racing | 27 | Ford | DAY | CAL | LVS | BRI | NSH | PHO | TEX | TAL | RCH | DAR | DOV | CLT | NSH | KEN | ROA | NHA | DAY | CHI | GTY | IRP | IOW | GLN; 7 | MCH | BRI | CGV | ATL | RCH | DOV | KAN | CAL | CLT | GTY | TEX | PHO | HOM | 102nd | 146 | |
| 2011 | Turner Motorsports | 30 | Chevy | DAY | PHO | LVS | BRI | CAL | TEX | TAL | NSH | RCH | DAR | DOV | IOW | CLT | CHI | MCH | ROA | DAY | KEN | NHA | NSH | IRP | IOW | GLN | CGV | BRI | ATL | RCH | CHI | DOV | KAN | CLT | TEX | PHO | HOM; 24 | | 124th | 0^{1} | |
| 2012 | Turner Motorsports | 30 | Chevy | DAY | PHO | LVS | BRI | CAL | TEX | RCH | TAL | DAR | IOW | CLT | DOV | MCH | **ROA**; 1* | KEN | DAY | NHA | CHI | IND | IOW | GLN | CGV | BRI; 21 | ATL | RCH | CHI | KEN | DOV | CLT | KAN | TEX | PHO | HOM | | | 105th | 0^{1} | |
| 2013 | Turner Scott Motorsports | 30 | Chevy | DAY; 11 | PHO; 15 | LVS; 13 | BRI; 34 | CAL; 16 | TEX; 18 | RCH; 14 | TAL; 29 | DAR; 16 | CLT; 16 | DOV; 20 | IOW; 25 | MCH; 9 | ROA; 21 | KEN; 8 | DAY; 21 | NHA; 12 | CHI; 17 | IND; 14 | IOW; 14 | GLN; 9 | MOH; 27 | BRI; 24 | ATL; 12 | RCH; 21 | CHI; 10 | KEN; 27 | DOV; 24 | KAN; 20 | CLT; 25 | TEX; 15 | PHO; 18 | HOM; 10 | | | 12th | 861 | |
| 2016 | Biagi-DenBeste Racing | 98 | Ford | DAY | ATL | LVS | PHO | CAL | TEX | BRI | RCH | TAL | DOV | CLT | POC | MCH | IOW | DAY | KEN | NHA | IND | IOW | GLN | MOH; 38 | BRI | ROA | DAR | RCH | CHI | KEN | DOV | CLT | KAN | TEX | PHO | HOM | | | 83rd | 3 | |

==== Camping World Truck Series ====
NASCAR Camping World Truck Series results
| Year | Team | No. | Make | 1 | 2 | 3 | 4 | 5 | 6 | 7 | 8 | 9 | 10 | 11 | 12 | 13 | 14 | 15 | 16 | 17 | 18 | 19 | 20 | 21 | 22 | 23 | 24 | 25 | NCWTC | Pts | Ref |
|---|---|---|---|---|---|---|---|---|---|---|---|---|---|---|---|---|---|---|---|---|---|---|---|---|---|---|---|---|---|---|---|
| 2010 | Red Horse Racing | 1 | Toyota | DAY; 6 | ATL | MAR | NSH | KAN | DOV | | | | | | | | | | | | | | | | | | | | 44th | 644 | |
| 2010 | Billy Ballew Motorsports | 15 | Toyota | | | | | | | CLT; 16 | TEX; 8 | MCH; 10 | IOW | GTY | IRP | POC | NSH | DAR | BRI | CHI | KEN | NHA | LVS; 20 | MAR | TAL | TEX | PHO | HOM | 44th | 644 | |
| 2011 | Kevin Harvick Inc. | 8 | Chevy | DAY; 27 | PHO; 13 | DAR; 32 | MAR; 30 | NSH; 2 | DOV; 16 | CLT; 21 | KAN; 8 | TEX; 13 | KEN; 22 | IOW; 8 | NSH; 4 | IRP; 14 | POC; 14 | MCH; 16 | BRI; 8 | ATL; 20 | CHI; 3 | NHA; 24 | KEN; 4 | LVS; 6 | TAL; 26 | MAR; 13 | TEX; 4 | HOM; 4 | 10th | 752 | |
| 2012 | Turner Motorsports | 30 | Chevy | DAY; 22 | MAR; 6 | **CAR**; 7* | KAN; 4 | CLT; 29 | DOV; 4 | TEX; 5 | KEN; 29 | IOW; 9 | CHI; 26 | **POC**; 3* | MCH; 1 | BRI; 18 | ATL; 8 | IOW; 6 | KEN; 12 | LVS; 1 | TAL; 31 | MAR; 2 | **TEX**; 3* | **PHO**; 8 | HOM; 4 | | | | 7th | 747 | |
| 2013 | Turner Scott Motorsports | 30 | Chevy | DAY | MAR; 19 | CAR | KAN | CLT | DOV | TEX | KEN | IOW | ELD | POC | MCH | BRI | MSP | IOW | CHI | LVS | TAL | MAR | TEX | PHO | | | | | 100th | 0^{1} | |
| 2013 | NTS Motorsports | 9 | Chevy | | | | | | | | | | | | | | | | | | | | | | HOM; 31 | | | | 100th | 0^{1} | |

^{1} Ineligible for Camping World Truck championship points

==== K&N Pro Series East ====
NASCAR K&N Pro Series East results
| Year | Team | No. | Make | 1 | 2 | 3 | 4 | 5 | 6 | 7 | 8 | 9 | 10 | 11 | 12 | 13 | 14 | NKNPSEC | Pts | Ref |
|---|---|---|---|---|---|---|---|---|---|---|---|---|---|---|---|---|---|---|---|---|
| 2012 | X Team Racing | 14 | Toyota | **BRI**; 1* | GRE | | | | | | | | | | | | | 37th | 75 | |
| 2012 | X Team Racing | 17 | Toyota | | | RCH; 17 | IOW | BGS | JFC | LGY | CNB | COL | IOW | NHA | DOV | GRE | CAR | 37th | 75 | |

^{1} Ineligible for series points

=== ARCA Racing Series ===
(key) (Bold – Pole position awarded by qualifying time. Italics – Pole position earned by points standings or practice time. * – Most laps led.)

ARCA Racing Series results
| Year | Team | No. | Make | 1 | 2 | 3 | 4 | 5 | 6 | 7 | 8 | 9 | 10 | 11 | 12 | 13 | 14 | 15 | 16 | 17 | 18 | 19 | 20 | ARSC | Pts | Ref |
|---|---|---|---|---|---|---|---|---|---|---|---|---|---|---|---|---|---|---|---|---|---|---|---|---|---|---|
| 2010 | Eddie Sharp Racing | 6 | Toyota | DAY; 27 | PBE | SLM | **TEX**; 9 | TAL | TOL | POC; 12 | MCH | IOW | MFD | POC | BLN | NJE | ISF | CHI | DSF | TOL | SLM | KAN | CAR | 50th | 450 | |

=== Complete Global RallyCross results ===
==== Supercar ====
Global RallyCross Championship results
| Year | Entrant | Car | 1 | 2 | 3 | 4 | 5 | 6 | 7 | 8 | 9 | 10 | 11 | 12 | GRC | Points |
|---|---|---|---|---|---|---|---|---|---|---|---|---|---|---|---|---|
| 2013 | X Team Racing | Mitsubishi Lancer | BRA; 11 | MUN | MUN | LOU; 10 | BRI | IRW | ATL | CHA; 15 | LV; 15 | | | | 19th | 17 |
| 2014 | SH Rallycross | Ford Fiesta ST | BAR; 4 | AUS; 3 | DC; 2 | NY; 2 | CHA; 3 | DAY; 8 | LA1; 12 | LA2; 9 | SEA; 4 | LV; DNS | | | 4th | 307 |
| 2015 | SH Rallycross | Ford Fiesta ST | FTA; 3 | DAY1; 7 | DAY2; 6 | MCAS; 3 | DET1; 8 | DET2; 9 | DC; 1 | LA1; 8 | LA2; DSQ | BAR1; 5 | BAR2; 3 | LV; 6 | 4th | 380 |
| 2016 | SH Rallycross | Ford Fiesta ST | PHO1 | PHO2 | DAL | DAY1 | DAY2 | MCAS1 | MCAS2; C | DC; 7 | AC; 8 | SEA; 8 | LA1 | LA2 | 12th | 63 |

=== Stock Car Pro Series ===
Stock Car Brasil results
| Year | Team | Car | 1 | 2 | 3 | 4 | 5 | 6 | 7 | 8 | 9 | 10 | 11 | 12 | 13 | 14 | 15 | 16 | 17 | 18 | 19 | 20 | 21 | 22 | 23 | 24 | 25 | Rank | Points |
|---|---|---|---|---|---|---|---|---|---|---|---|---|---|---|---|---|---|---|---|---|---|---|---|---|---|---|---|---|---|
| 2014 | Mobil Super Pioneer Racing | Chevrolet Sonic | INT; 1; 6 | SCZ; 1 | SCZ; 2 | BRA; 1 | BRA; 2 | GOI; 1 | GOI; 2 | GOI; 1 | CAS; 1 | CAS; 2 | CUR; 1 | CUR; 2 | VEL; 1 | VEL; 2 | SCZ; 1 | SCZ; 2 | TAR; 1 | TAR; 2 | SAL; 1 | SAL; 2 | CUR; 1 | | | | | NC† | 0† |
| 2015 | TMG Racing | Chevrolet Sonic | **GOI**; **1**; 28 | RBP; 1 | RBP; 2 | VEL; 1 | VEL; 2 | CUR; 1 | CUR; 2 | SCZ; 1 | SCZ; 2 | CUR; 1 | CUR; 2 | GOI; 1 | CAS; 1 | CAS; 2 | BRA; 1 | BRA; 2 | CUR; 1 | CUR; 2 | TAR; 1 | TAR; 2 | INT; 1 | | | | | NC† | 0† |
| 2016 | Shell Racing | Chevrolet Sonic | CUR; 1; 6 | VEL; 1 | VEL; 2 | GOI; 1 | GOI; 2 | SCZ; 1 | SCZ; 2 | TAR; 1 | TAR; 2 | CAS; 1 | CAS; 2 | INT; 1 | LON; 1 | LON; 2 | CUR; 1 | CUR; 2 | GOI; 1 | GOI; 2 | CDC; 1 | CDC; 2 | INT; 1 | | | | | NC† | 0† |
| 2018 | Full Time Bassani | Chevrolet Cruze | INT; 1 Ret | CUR; 1; 15 | CUR; 2; 18 | VEL; 1; 19 | VEL; 2 Ret | LON; 1; 19 | LON; 2; 16 | SCZ; 1 | SCZ; 2 | GOI; 1 DSQ | MOU; 1 Ret | MOU; 2; 3 | CAS; 1; 18 | CAS; 2 Ret | VCA; 1; 7 | VCA; 2; 8 | TAR; 1; 17 | TAR; 2 Ret | GOI; 1; 6 | GOI; 2; 2 | INT; 1; 20 | | | | | 15th | 65 |
| 2019 | Full Time Sports | Chevrolet Cruze | VEL; 1; 7 | VCA; 1; 20 | VCA; 2 Ret | GOI; 1; 21 | GOI; 2; 10 | LON; 1; 6 | LON; 2; 7 | SCZ; 1; 16 | SCZ; 2; 3 | MOU; 1; 18 | MOU; 2; 18 | INT; 1; 6 | VEL; 1; 17 | VEL; 2; 12 | CAS; 1; 11 | CAS; 2; 17 | VCA; 1; 23 | VCA; 2; 17 | GOI; 1; 7 | GOI; 2; 2 | INT; 1 Ret | | | | | 13th | 163 |
| 2020 | Full Time Bassani | Toyota Corolla | GOI; 1 Ret | GOI; 2; 2 | INT; 1; 1 | INT; 2 Ret | LON; 1; 6 | LON; 2; 3 | CAS; 1 Ret | CAS; 2 Ret | CAS; 3; 5 | VCA; 1; 7 | VCA; 2; 16 | CUR; 1; 16 | CUR; 2; 15 | CUR; 3; 2 | GOI; 1; 18 | GOI; 2; 13 | GOI; 3; 2 | INT; 1; 3 | | | | | | | | 7th | 224 |
| 2021 | MX Piquet Sports | Toyota Corolla | GOI; 1; 24 | GOI; 2 DNS | INT; 1; 28 | INT; 2; 13 | VCA; 1 Ret | VCA; 2; 22 | VCA; 1; 23 | VCA; 2 Ret | CAS; 1 Ret | CAS; 2; 19 | CUR; 1; 25 | CUR; 2; 25 | CUR; 1; 12 | CUR; 2; 19 | GOI; 1 | GOI; 2 | GOI; 1 | GOI; 2 | VCA; 1 | VCA; 2 | SCZ; 1 | SCZ; 2 | INT; 1 | INT; 2 | | 30th | 24 |
| 2022 | Motul TMG Racing | Toyota Corolla | INT; 1; 17 | GOI; 1; 8 | GOI; 2 Ret | RIO; 1; 11 | RIO; 2; 14 | VCA; 1; 7 | VCA; 2; 9 | VEL; 1; 10 | VEL; 2; 1 | VEL; 1 Ret | VEL; 2; 9 | INT; 1; 24 | INT; 2; 4 | VCA; 1; 12 | VCA; 2; 6 | SCZ; 1 Ret | SCZ; 2 DNS | GOI; 1; 8 | GOI; 2; 1 | GOI; 1; 8 | GOI; 2; 7 | INT; 1; 22 | INT; 2; 2 | | | 8th | 232 |
| 2023 | Crown Racing | Toyota Corolla | GOI; 1; 5 | GOI; 2; 10 | INT; 1 | INT; 2 | TAR; 1; 5 | TAR; 2 Ret | CAS; 1 Ret | CAS; 2 Ret | INT; 1; 4 | INT; 2; 4 | VCA; 1; 9 | VCA; 2; 16 | GOI; 1; 2 | GOI; 2; 23 | VEL; 1; 19 | VEL; 2; 8 | BUE; 1; 15 | BUE; 2; 15 | VCA; 1; 24 | VCA; 2; 4 | CAS; 1; 21 | CAS; 2; 18 | INT; 1; 27 | INT; 2; 8 | | 14th | 191 |
| 2024 | Cavaleiro Sports | Chevrolet Cruze | GOI; 1; 13 | GOI; 2; 16 | VCA; 1; 14 | VCA; 2 C | INT; 1; 6 | INT; 2; 20 | CAS; 1; 20 | CAS; 2; 9 | VCA; 1; 17 | VCA; 2; 16 | VCA; 3; 19 | GOI; 1; 4 | GOI; 2 Ret | BLH; 1; 7 | BLH; 2; 2 | VEL; 1; 13 | VEL; 2; 13 | BUE; 1; 20 | BUE; 2; 22 | URU; 1; 15 | URU; 2; 17 | GOI; 1; 7 | GOI; 2; 6 | INT; 1; 22 | INT; 2; 15 | 19th | 591 |
| 2025 | Scuderia Bandeiras Sports | Mitsubishi Eclipse Cross | INT; 1 Ret | CAS; 1; 5 | CAS; 2; 15 | VEL; 1; 6 | VEL; 2; 10 | VCA; 1; 23 | VCA; 2; 1 | CRS; 1; 10 | CRS; 2; 15 | CAS; 1; 11 | CAS; 2; 8 | VCA; 1; 24 | VCA; 2; 24 | VCA; 1; 23 | VCA; 2; 2 | MOU; 1; 3 | MOU; 2; 22 | CUI; 1; 3 | CUI; 2; 13 | BRA; 1; 3 | **BRA**; **2**; 1 | INT; 1; 6 | INT; 2; 22 | | | 6th | 713 |
| 2026 | Scuderia Bandeiras | Chevrolet Tracker | CRS; 1; 11 | CRS; 2; 26 | CAS; 1; 6 | CAS; 2; 1 | INT; 1 DSQ | INT; 2 DSQ | GOI; 1; 2 | GOI; 2; 11 | CUI; 1; 13 | **CUI**; **2**; 1 | VCA; 1 | VCA; 2 | SCZ; 1 | SCZ; 2 | CRS; 1 | CRS; 2 | | | | | | | | | | 19th* | 380* |
| 2026 | Full Time Racing | Chevrolet Tracker | | | | | | | | | | | | | | | | | BRA; 1; 9 | CAS; 1 | CAS; 2 | VEL; 1 | INT; 1 | INT; 2 | | | | 19th* | 380* |

^{†} Ineligible for championship points. ^{*} Season still in progress.

=== Complete Blancpain Sprint Series results ===
Blancpain Sprint Series results
| Year | Team | Car | Class | 1 | 2 | 3 | 4 | 5 | 6 | 7 | 8 | 9 | 10 | 11 | 12 | 13 | 14 | Pos. | Points |
|---|---|---|---|---|---|---|---|---|---|---|---|---|---|---|---|---|---|---|---|
| 2014 | BMW Sport Trophy Team Brasil | BMW Z4 GT3 | Pro | NOG; QR; 18 | NOG; CR; 15 | BRH; QR | BRH; CR | ZAN; QR; 12 | ZAN; CR; 8 | SVK; QR | SVK; CR | ALG; QR; 10 | ALG; CR; 16 | ZOL; QR; 22 | ZOL; CR; Ret | BAK; QR | BAK; CR | 37th | 4 |

=== Complete Formula E results ===
(key) (Races in bold indicate pole position; races in italics indicate fastest lap)

Formula E results
| Year | Team | Chassis | Powertrain | 1 | 2 | 3 | 4 | 5 | 6 | 7 | 8 | 9 | 10 | 11 | 12 | 13 | Pos | Points |
|---|---|---|---|---|---|---|---|---|---|---|---|---|---|---|---|---|---|---|
| 2014–15 | China Racing / NEXTEV TCR | Spark SRT01-e | SRT01-e | BEI; 8 | PUT; Ret | PDE; 2 | BUE; 3 | MIA; 5 | LBH; 1 | MCO; 3 | BER; 4 | MSC; 1 | LDN; 5 | LDN; 7 | | | 1st | 144 |
| 2015–16 | NEXTEV TCR | Spark SRT01-e | NEXTEV TCR FormulaE 001 | BEI; 15† | PUT; 8 | PDE; 15† | BUE; 12 | MEX; 13 | LBH; Ret | PAR; Ret | BER; 13 | LDN; 12 | LDN; 9 | | | | 15th | 8 |
| 2016–17 | NEXTEV NIO | Spark SRT01-e | NEXTEV FormulaE 002 | **HKG**; 11 | MRK; 16 | BUE; 5 | MEX; 9 | MCO; 4 | PAR; 7 | BER; 12 | BER; 12 | NYC; 11 | NYC; 16† | MTL; 13 | MTL; 16 | | 11th | 33 |
| 2017–18 | Panasonic Jaguar Racing | Spark SRT01-e | Jaguar I-Type 2 | HKG; 4 | HKG; 12 | MRK; 4 | SCL; 6 | MEX; 4 | PDE; Ret | RME; Ret | PAR; Ret | BER; 12 | ZUR; Ret | NYC; Ret | NYC; 7 | | 9th | 51 |
| 2018–19 | Panasonic Jaguar Racing | Spark SRT05e | Jaguar I-Type 3 | ADR; 10 | MRK; 14 | SCL; 11 | MEX; Ret | HKG; Ret | SYX; Ret | RME | PAR | MCO | BER | BRN | NYC | NYC | 22nd | 1 |

^{†} Driver did not finish the race, but was classified as he completed more than 90% of the race distance.

=== Complete American open-wheel racing results ===
==== Indy Lights ====
| Year | Team | 1 | 2 | 3 | 4 | 5 | 6 | 7 | 8 | 9 | 10 | 11 | 12 | 13 | 14 | 15 | 16 | Rank | Points |
|---|---|---|---|---|---|---|---|---|---|---|---|---|---|---|---|---|---|---|---|
| 2015 | Carlin Motorsport | STP | STP | LBH | ALA | ALA | IMS | IMS | INDY | **TOR**; 7 | TOR; 8 | MIL | IOW | MOH | MOH | LAG | LAG | 15th | 28 |

=== Complete FIA World Endurance Championship results ===
FIA World Endurance Championship results
| Year | Entrant | Class | Chassis | Engine | 1 | 2 | 3 | 4 | 5 | 6 | 7 | 8 | 9 | Rank | Points |
|---|---|---|---|---|---|---|---|---|---|---|---|---|---|---|---|
| 2016 | Rebellion Racing | LMP1 | Rebellion R-One | AER P60 2.4 L Turbo V6 | SIL; 4 | SPA; 4 | LMS; 13 | NÜR | MEX | COA | FUJ | SHA | BHR | 15th | 25 |
| 2017 | Vaillante Rebellion | LMP2 | Oreca 07 | Gibson GK428 4.2 L V8 | SIL; 9 | SPA; 4 | LMS; DSQ | NÜR | MEX; 5 | COA; 2 | **FUJ**; DSQ | SHA; 3 | BHR; 3 | 12th | 73 |

=== Complete European Le Mans Series results ===
(key) (Races in bold indicate pole position; results in italics indicate fastest lap)

| Year | Entrant | Class | Chassis | Engine | 1 | 2 | 3 | 4 | 5 | 6 | Rank | Points |
|---|---|---|---|---|---|---|---|---|---|---|---|---|
| 2023 | United Autosports USA | LMP2 Pro-Am | Oreca 07 | Gibson GK428 4.2 L V8 | CAT; 10 | LEC; 5 | ARA | SPA; 3 | ALG; 4 | ALG; 9 | 8th | 40 |
| 2024 | Team Virage | LMP2 Pro-Am | Oreca 07 | Gibson GK428 4.2 L V8 | CAT; NC | LEC; 7 | IMO; 4 | SPA | MUG | ALG | 13th | 18 |

=== Complete TCR World Tour results ===
(key) (Races in bold indicate pole position) (Races in italics indicate fastest lap)

| Year | Team | Car | 1 | 2 | 3 | 4 | 5 | 6 | 7 | 8 | 9 | 10 | 11 | 12 | 13 | 14 | DC | Points |
|---|---|---|---|---|---|---|---|---|---|---|---|---|---|---|---|---|---|---|
| 2024 | Squadra Martino | Honda Civic Type R TCR (FK8) | VAL; 1 | VAL; 2 | MRK; 1 | MRK; 2 | MOH; 1 | MOH; 2 | SAP; 1; 11 | SAP; 2; 19 | ELP; 1 | ELP; 2 | ZHZ; 1 | ZHZ; 2 | MAC; 1 | MAC; 2 | 29th | 6 |

Sporting positions
| Preceded by Juliano Moro | Formula Three Sudamericana; Champion; 2002 | Succeeded by Danilo Dirani |
| Preceded by Alan van der Merwe | British Formula Three Champion; 2004 | Succeeded by Álvaro Parente |
| Preceded by Inaugural | FIA Formula E Championship; Champion; 2014–15 | Succeeded by Sébastien Buemi |
Awards
| Preceded by Robbie Kerr | Autosport; National Racing Driver of the Year; 2003 | Succeeded by James Thompson |
| Preceded by Austin Dillon | NASCAR Camping World Truck Series; Most Popular Driver; 2012 | Succeeded by Ty Dillon |
