= Autódromo Internacional Virgílio Távora =

Motorsport race track in Brazil

- Full Circuit (1997–present)
- Location: Eusébio, Ceará, Brazil
- Coordinates: 3°53′42″S 38°27′50″W
- Capacity: 5,500
- Opened: 12 January 1969; 57 years ago Re-opened: 30 November 1997; 28 years ago
- Closed: 1993
- Major events: Former: Copa Truck (2017); Fórmula Truck (2006–2009); F3 Sudamericana (2000–2002); Stock Car Brasil (1979, 1984, 1989, 1992)

Full Circuit (1997–present)
- Length: 3.000 km (1.864 mi)
- Turns: 11
- Race lap record: 1:06.525 ( (Brazil) Nelson Piquet Jr., Dallara F301, 2002, F3)

Truck Circuit (2006–present)
- Length: 1.780 km (1.106 mi)
- Turns: 9
- Race lap record: 1:00.391 ( (Brazil) Felipe Giaffone, Volkswagen Truck, 2017, Truck racing)

Original Circuit (1969–1993)
- Length: 2.500 km (1.553 mi)
- Turns: 6

Autódromo Internacional Virgílio Távora is a 3.000 km (1.864 mi) motorsport race track located in Eusébio, Ceará, Brazil. The circuit was inaugurated on 12 January 1969 with the event of Grande Prêmio Ministro Mário Andreazza. The circuit is mainly used for the national events, however it also hosted some international events, such as Formula 3 Sudamericana between 2000 and 2002. The circuit was closed in 1993, and re-opened on 30 November 1997.

== Layout configurations ==
Autódromo Internacional Virgílio Távora Layout Configurations
Original Circuit (1969–1993)

Full Circuit (1997–present)

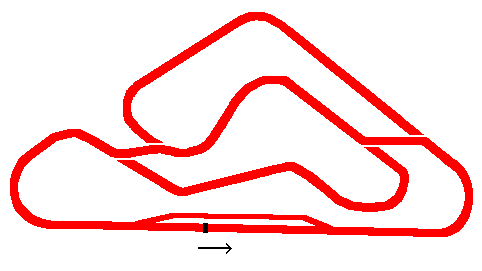
The map showing both Full Circuit (1997–present) and Truck Circuit (2006–present)

== Lap records ==
As of July 2017, the fastest official lap records at the Autódromo Internacional Virgílio Távora are listed as:

Category	Time	Driver	Vehicle	Event
Full Circuit (1997–present): 3.000 km (1.864 mi)
Formula Three	1:06.525	Nelson Piquet Jr.	Dallara F301	2002 Fortaleza F3 Sudamericana round
Truck Circuit (2006–present): 1.780 km (1.106 mi)
Truck racing	1:00.391	Felipe Giaffone	Volkswagen Truck	2017 Fortaleza Copa Truck round
