= 2008 Mexico City A1GP round =

Motor racing meeting

2007-08 A1GP of Mexico
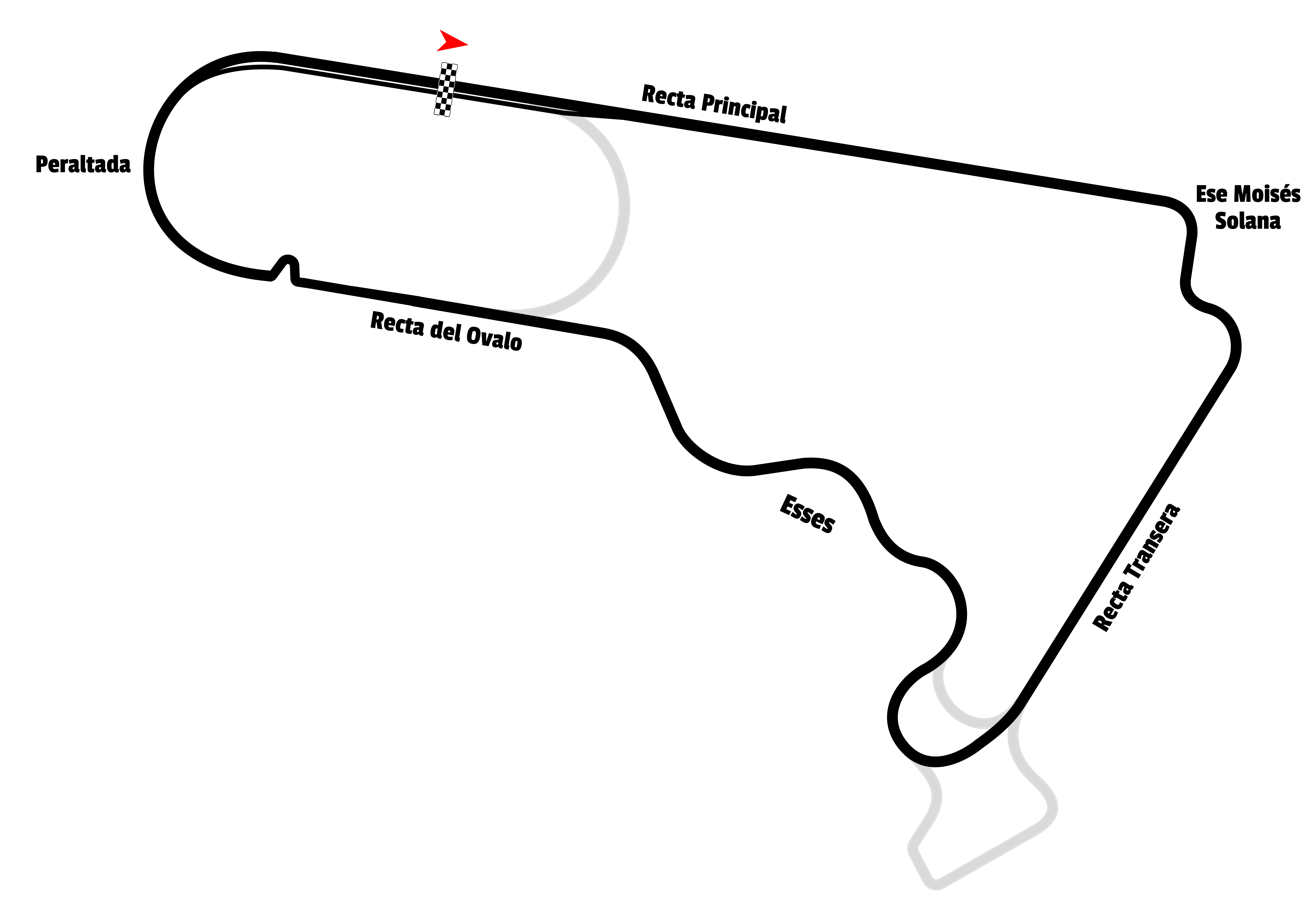

Race Details
- Race 8 of 10 in the 2007-08 A1 Grand Prix season
- Date: March 16, 2008
- Location: Autódromo Hermanos Rodríguez; Mexico City, Mexico
- Weather: dry

Sprint race

Qualifying
- Pole: South Africa (Adrian Zaugg)
- Time: 1'20.315

Podium
- 1st: New Zealand (Jonny Reid)
- 2nd: Great Britain (Oliver Jarvis)
- 3rd: Switzerland (Neel Jani)

Fastest Lap
- FL: China (Cong Fu Cheng)
- Time: 1'21.589, (Lap 11)

Feature race

Qualifying
- Pole: Canada (Robert Wickens)
- Time: 1'20.278

Podium
- 1st: Ireland (Adam Carroll)
- 2nd: Great Britain (Oliver Jarvis)
- 3rd: USA (Jonathan Summerton)

Fastest Lap
- FL: Great Britain (Oliver Jarvis)
- Time: 1'21.417, (Lap 37)

Official Classifications
- PDF Booklet

The 2007–08 A1 Grand Prix of Nations, Mexico is an A1 Grand Prix race, held on March 16, 2008, at the Autódromo Hermanos Rodríguez, Mexico City, Mexico. This is the eighth meeting in the 2007-08 A1 Grand Prix season.

== Pre-race ==
David Martínez (Mexico) who race two venues in the 2005-06 season was recalled to drive Rookie sessions due to ineligibility of current main driver David Garza Perez. Josef Král (Czech Republic) was replaced by Filip Salaquarda for the last three meetings. This Czech driver race in one round in 2006-07. Initially, Josef Král was called for race all four rounds but its results in the last South African venue (18th and 16th) weren't enough for its team.

== Qualifications ==
In Rookie sessions, David Rigon (Italy) top the classification for its first A1GP appearance. This performance was only achieved before by Jonathan Summerton (USA) in 2006-07, Australia.

Mexico and France made disappointing qualifying sessions. David Garza Perez (Mexico) spin and hit the wall in the Peraltada corner in its last hot lap, he start from last row of the grid in each races. Jonathan Cochet line up on 16th and 14th position for his first race weekend replacing Loïc Duval for French team who is second in the standings before Mexican rounds.

Robert Wickens (Canada) make the Feature race pole position under yellow flag during the last qualifying session when David Garza Perez (Mexico) spin off. These circumstances are controversial according to several drivers, like Neel Jani who realize the second time, but the race stewards take no action against the Canadian team.

Sprint race qualifications
| Pos | Team | Time | Gap |
|---|---|---|---|
| 1 | South Africa | 1'20.315 | - |
| 2 | New Zealand | 1'20.397 | +0.082 |
| 3 | (United States) USA | 1'20.426 | +0.111 |
| 4 | Switzerland | 1'20.518 | +0.203 |
| 5 | (United Kingdom) Great Britain | 1'20.556 | +0.241 |
| 6 | Canada | 1'20.621 | +0.306 |
| 7 | (Republic of Ireland) Ireland | 1'20.769 | +0.454 |
| 8 | Brazil | 1'20.842 | +0.527 |
| 9 | Portugal | 1'20.940 | +0.625 |
| 10 | Italy | 1'20.961 | +0.646 |
| 11 | Netherlands | 1'21.005 | +0.690 |
| 12 | China | 1'21.028 | +0.713 |
| 13 | Germany | 1'21.054 | +0.739 |
| 14 | Malaysia | 1'21.099 | +0.784 |
| 15 | Pakistan | 1'21.176 | +0.861 |
| 16 | France | 1'21.417 | +1.102 |
| 17 | Australia | 1'21.789 | +1.474 |
| 18 | India | 1'21.799 | +1.484 |
| 19 | Lebanon | 1'22.012 | +1.697 |
| 20 | Indonesia | 1'22.044 | +1.729 |
| 21 | Mexico | 1'22.370 | +2.055 |
| 22 | Czech Republic | 1'22.373 | +2.058 |

Main race qualifications
| Pos | Team | Time | Gap |
|---|---|---|---|
| 1 | Canada | 1'20.278 | - |
| 2 | Switzerland | 1'20.320 | +0.042 |
| 3 | Germany | 1'20.646 | +0.368 |
| 4 | (United Kingdom) Great Britain | 1'20.705 | +0.427 |
| 5 | (Republic of Ireland) Ireland | 1'20.708 | +0.430 |
| 6 | New Zealand | 1'20.743 | +0.465 |
| 7 | (United States) USA | 1'20.783 | +0.505 |
| 8 | Portugal | 1'20.825 | +0.547 |
| 9 | China | 1'20.859 | +0.581 |
| 10 | South Africa | 1'20.870 | +0.592 |
| 11 | Malaysia | 1'20.939 | +0.661 |
| 12 | Italy | 1'20.953 | +0.675 |
| 13 | Netherlands | 1'21.263 | +0.985 |
| 14 | France | 1'21.310 | +1.032 |
| 15 | Australia | 1'21.358 | +1.080 |
| 16 | Lebanon | 1'21.441 | +1.163 |
| 17 | Pakistan | 1'21.484 | +1.206 |
| 18 | Brazil | 1'21.675 | +1.397 |
| 19 | Indonesia | 1'21.788 | +1.510 |
| 20 | India | 1'21.909 | +1.631 |
| 21 | Czech Republic | 1'22.333 | +2.055 |
| 22 | Mexico | 1'22.371 | +2.093 |

== Sprint race ==
It is 28 °C for the sprint race and a near 50 °C for the track temperature. A second start was planned because of multiple crash in the first. Oliver Jarvis (Great Britain) hit the back of Neel Jani (Switzerland) car's. Pakistan and then Australia hit Germany. Ireland and Brazil went off the track. Red flag is brandished and a new start is scheduled 20 minutes later. All teams had time to repair damages and line up in their qualifying position except Germany who cannot take part in the second start.

The start is properly done this time and South Africa take the lead but only for two laps to have sustained a puncture. New Zealand lead Great Britain, Switzerland and Ireland. Australia is out since Lap 1, hitting Pakistan. Jonathan Cochet (France passes Narain Karthikeyan (India) in Lap 4 for 13th. The Safety car is out in Lap 6 when Filip Salaquarda (Czech Republic) spin in the chicane.

After the safety car comes on in Lap 9, Great Britain, Switzerland and Ireland are close together using PowerBoosts to make the difference but all preserve their own position. In Lap 10, Cong Fu Cheng (China) hit David Garza Perez (Brazil) and go to the pits. China make the fastest lap on Lap 13. Jonny Reid (New Zealand) take its fourth win of the season behind Great Britain, Switzerland, Ireland, USA, Portugal, Canada, Netherlands, Malaysia and Brazil finished 10th.

| Pos | Team | Driver | Laps | Time | Points |
|---|---|---|---|---|---|
| 1 | New Zealand | Jonny Reid | 14 | 20'59.462 | 15 |
| 2 | (United Kingdom) Great Britain | Oliver Jarvis | 14 | +2.697 | 12 |
| 3 | Switzerland | Neel Jani | 14 | +3.745 | 10 |
| 4 | (Republic of Ireland) Ireland | Adam Carroll | 14 | +4.291 | 8 |
| 5 | (United States) USA | Jonathan Summerton | 14 | +4.721 | 6 |
| 6 | Portugal | Filipe Albuquerque | 14 | +7.125 | 5 |
| 7 | Canada | Robert Wickens | 14 | +7.787 | 4 |
| 8 | Netherlands | Jeroen Bleekemolen | 14 | +8.597 | 3 |
| 9 | Malaysia | Alex Yoong | 14 | +9.599 | 2 |
| 10 | Brazil | Bruno Junqueira | 14 | +10.952 | 1 |
| 11 | Italy | Edoardo Piscopo | 14 | +11.538 | |
| 12 | France | Jonathan Cochet | 14 | +12.483 | |
| 13 | India | Narain Karthikeyan | 14 | +14.859 | |
| 14 | Indonesia | Satrio Hermanto | 14 | +15.600 | |
| 15 | Lebanon | Jimmy Auby | 14 | +16.970 | |
| 16 | Mexico | David Garza Perez | 14 | +18.363 | |
| 17 | China | Cong Fu Cheng | 11 | +1 lap | +1 |
| Ret | Czech Republic | Filip Salaquarda | 4 | Spun Off | |
| Ret | Pakistan | Adam Langley-Khan | 4 | +10 laps | |
| Ret | South Africa | Adrian Zaugg | 2 | Puncture | |
| Ret | Australia | John Martin | 0 | Collision | |
| DNS | Germany | Michael Ammermüller | - | - | |

== Main race ==
The start was aborted because Brazil was way out of its position. At 15:15 the race was restarted and Canada took the lead behind Switzerland, Great Britain, New Zealand, Ireland, Germany, USA, Portugal, Malaysia, South Africa. Australia and Italy get in the pits but Edoardo Piscopo (Italy) retire. In Lap 4, China passes Malaysia for 10th. In Lap 7, Neel Jani (Switzerland) grabb the lead to Robert Wickens (Canada). Australia receive a drive-through penalty. The first window to mandatory pit stops is open on Lap 10.
New Zealand loses some positions with its bad pit stop. Switzerland made the festest lap just after pitting. France then Indonesia, for the first time in A1GP history, lead the race due to late stops. After the first mandatory stops, in Lap 16, Switzerland take the lead behind Ireland, Canada, Great Britain, Germany, USA, New Zealand, South Africa, Netherlands and China. In the next lap, Oliver Jarvis (Great Britain) passes Robert Wickens (Canada) for 3rd. During the next laps, Switzerland increase its advance to 6 secondes, Michael Ammermüller (Germany) come near to Canada and try to passes without success and Jonathan Summerton (USA) close to Germany.
In Lap 27, Jonny Reid (New Zealand) hit the kerb in the chicane and finish in the tire wall. The Safety car is out until lap 29. New Zealand is still in the race but in 20th. In Lap 32, USA passes Canada by way of its Power-to-Pass. Malaysia who were 10th, loses two positions in the same Lap 33. Portugal passes at Turn 2 and Brazil on a side-by-side overtake in Turns 4 and 5. Next lap, Germany and Canada hits each other and Michael Ammermüller (Germany) should change its car's nose. It's the second mandatory pit stops.
Switzerland, Ireland, Great Britain and USA pit immediately. Switzerland and Ireland exit side-by-side gratefully to the Ireland pits team. Adam Carroll (Ireland) take the lead at the end of the pit lane. Switzerland its second behind Great Britain, USA, Netherlands, Canada, South Africa, Portugal, Brazil and Malaysia. New Zealand and France are fighting but for 16th. Czech Republic and Switzerland receive a drive-through penalty in Lap 41 when Great Britain made the fastest lap. In Lap 44, Neel Jani (Switzerland) is 11th behind Pakistan. Jonathan Summerton (USA) is close to Oliver Jarvis (Great Britain) and try to passes during the last laps of the race.
The final order is Ireland, the 15th team to win a race in A1GP behind Great Britain, USA, Netherlands, Canada, South Africa, Portugal, Brazil, India and China. The championship leader finish 12th for New Zealand, 13th for France and 19th for Switzerland. Switzerland lead the series by 15 points behindNew Zealand and 20 points behind France who not score any points this weekend.

| Pos | Team | Driver | Laps | Time | Points |
|---|---|---|---|---|---|
| 1 | (Republic of Ireland) Ireland | Adam Carroll | 47 | 1:07'47.858 | 15 |
| 2 | (United Kingdom) Great Britain | Oliver Jarvis | 47 | +3.355 | 12+1 |
| 3 | (United States) USA | Jonathan Summerton | 47 | +4.104 | 10 |
| 4 | Netherlands | Jeroen Bleekemolen | 47 | +13.653 | 8 |
| 5 | Canada | Robert Wickens | 47 | +15.175 | 6 |
| 6 | South Africa | Adrian Zaugg | 47 | +16.195 | 5 |
| 7 | Portugal | Filipe Albuquerque | 47 | +16.542 | 4 |
| 8 | Brazil | Bruno Junqueira | 47 | +17.253 | 3 |
| 9 | India | Narain Karthikeyan | 47 | +26.504 | 2 |
| 10 | China | Cong Fu Cheng | 47 | +30.671 | 1 |
| 11 | Indonesia | Satrio Hermanto | 47 | +35.536 | |
| 12 | New Zealand | Jonny Reid | 47 | +36.051 | |
| 13 | France | Jonathan Cochet | 47 | +39.464 | |
| 14 | Mexico | David Garza Perez | 47 | +49.082 | |
| 15 | Malaysia | Alex Yoong | 47 | +53.860 | |
| 16 | Czech Republic | Filip Salaquarda | 47 | +1'06.153 | |
| 17 | Lebanon | Jimmy Auby | 47 | +1'24.771 | |
| 18 | Pakistan | Adam Langley-Khan | 46 | +1 lap | |
| 19 | Switzerland | Neel Jani | 46 | +1 lap | |
| 20 | Germany | Michael Ammermüller | 46 | +1 lap | |
| 21 | Australia | John Martin | 46 | +1 lap | |
| Ret | Italy | Edoardo Piscopo | 2 | +45 laps | |

== Notes ==
- It was the 30th race weekend (60 starts).
- It was the 2nd venue in Autódromo Hermanos Rodríguez and the 3rd in Mexico.
- It was the first race for Jimmy Auby (Lebanon), Jonathan Cochet (France).
- It was the first race weekend as Rookie driver for Jimmy Auby (Lebanon), Felipe Guimarães (Brazil), Davide Rigon (Italy), Bruno Serra (Portugal), Duncan Tappy (Great Britain).
- Records :
  - Ireland and Adam Carroll win their first race.
  - Lebanon participate on 30 rounds (60 starts) without won points since their first Grand Prix.
  - Neel Jani score 267 points.
  - Alex Yoong participate on 27 races (52 starts).
