= 2008 Shanghai A1GP round =

2007-08 A1GP of Shanghai, China
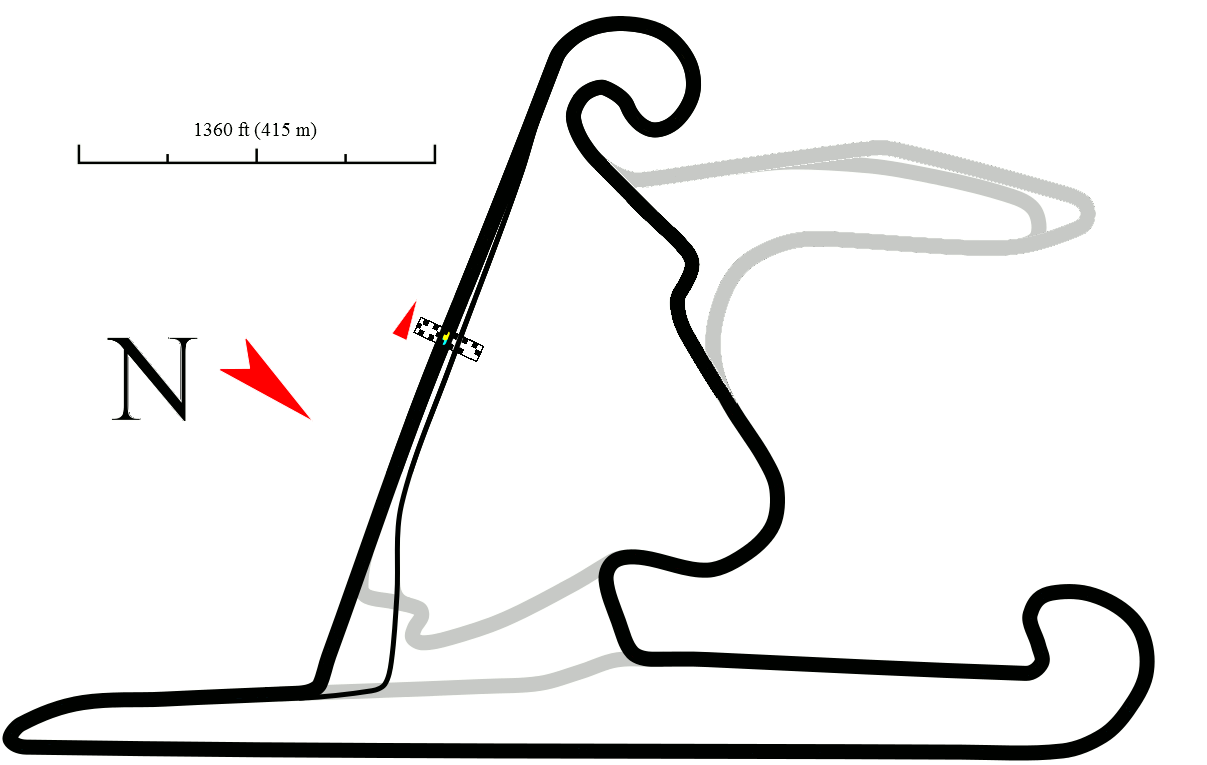

Race Details
- Race 9 of 10 in the 2007-08 A1 Grand Prix season
- Date: April 13, 2008
- Location: Shanghai International Circuit; Shanghai, China
- Weather: Overcast

Sprint race

Qualifying
- Pole: Switzerland (Neel Jani)
- Time: 1'34.163

Podium
- 1st: Switzerland (Neel Jani)
- 2nd: Canada (Robert Wickens)
- 3rd: Portugal (F.Albuquerque)

Fastest Lap
- FL: Switzerland (Neel Jani)
- Time: 1'35.400, (Lap 4)

Feature race

Qualifying
- Pole: Switzerland (Neel Jani)
- Time: 1'34.172

Podium
- 1st: USA (Jonathan Summerton)
- 2nd: Portugal (F.Albuquerque)
- 3rd: Ireland (Adam Carroll)

Fastest Lap
- FL: Canada (Robert Wickens)
- Time: 1'35.177, (Lap 33)

Official Classifications
- PDF Booklet

The 2007–08 A1 Grand Prix of Nations, Shanghai, China was an A1 Grand Prix race, held on April 13, 2008, at the Shanghai International Circuit, Shanghai, China. It was the ninth meeting in the 2007–08 A1 Grand Prix season.

== Pre-race ==
A1 Grand Prix make official the creation of an off-track entertainment, the A1GP Global Village, to complete, with the support series A2 Grand Prix, the race weekends next season. The Global Village deliver extra entertainments and interactive activities, merchandise shops, food and drinks for fans and spectators. An official website is launched A1GPGlobalVillage.com. The first edition will be in the last event of this 2007-08 season, on May 2–4, 2007-08, Great Britain.

Like the past season, A1GP organize a vote for the fan's favorite 2007-08 A1 team. All A1GP fan, and other, can vote in the official A1GP site. The winning team, revealed at the A1GP's Gala Awards, on May 5, 2008, receive a special award.

== Qualifications ==
Neel Jani (Switzerland) score the pole position for each Sunday races. For the second consecutive venue, Mexico start from the back of the grid in each race because of bad performances.

Sprint race qualifications
| Pos | Team | Time | Gap |
|---|---|---|---|
| 1 | Switzerland | 1'34.163 | - |
| 2 | Portugal | 1'34.613 | +0.450 |
| 3 | Canada | 1'34.682 | +0.519 |
| 4 | India | 1'34.688 | +0.525 |
| 5 | New Zealand | 1'34.742 | +0.579 |
| 6 | (United States) USA | 1'34.791 | +0.628 |
| 7 | Malaysia | 1'34.850 | +0.687 |
| 8 | (Republic of Ireland) Ireland | 1'34.928 | +0.765 |
| 9 | Germany | 1'35.012 | +0.849 |
| 10 | (United Kingdom) Great Britain | 1'35.015 | +0.852 |
| 11 | South Africa | 1'35.198 | +1.035 |
| 12 | Italy | 1'35.224 | +1.061 |
| 13 | Australia | 1'35.336 | +1.173 |
| 14 | Brazil | 1'35.492 | +1.329 |
| 15 | China | 1'35.508 | +1.345 |
| 16 | Czech Republic | 1'35.590 | +1.427 |
| 17 | Netherlands | 1'35.670 | +1.507 |
| 18 | France | 1'35.789 | +1.626 |
| 19 | Pakistan | 1'35.923 | +1.760 |
| 20 | Lebanon | 1'35.931 | +1.768 |
| 21 | Indonesia | 1'36.612 | +2.449 |
| 22 | Mexico | 1'38.312 | +4.149 |

Main race qualifications
| Pos | Team | Time | Gap |
|---|---|---|---|
| 1 | Switzerland | 1'34.172 | - |
| 2 | (United States) USA | 1'34.626 | +0.454 |
| 3 | Portugal | 1'35.022 | +0.850 |
| 4 | (Republic of Ireland) Ireland | 1'35.035 | +0.863 |
| 5 | India | 1'35.195 | +1.023 |
| 6 | Malaysia | 1'35.207 | +1.035 |
| 7 | New Zealand | 1'35.283 | +1.111 |
| 8 | (United Kingdom) Great Britain | 1'35.357 | +1.185 |
| 9 | South Africa | 1'35.392 | +1.220 |
| 10 | France | 1'35.496 | +1.324 |
| 11 | Italy | 1'35.520 | +1.348 |
| 12 | Canada | 1'35.554 | +1.382 |
| 13 | Germany | 1'35.558 | +1.386 |
| 14 | Czech Republic | 1'35.611 | +1.439 |
| 15 | Australia | 1'35.653 | +1.481 |
| 16 | Pakistan | 1'35.865 | +1.693 |
| 17 | Brazil | 1'35.887 | +1.715 |
| 18 | Netherlands | 1'35.921 | +1.749 |
| 19 | Lebanon | 1'36.066 | +1.894 |
| 20 | China | 1'36.136 | +1.964 |
| 21 | Indonesia | 1'36.326 | +2.154 |
| 22 | Mexico | 1'37.440 | +3.268 |

== Sprint race ==
For the Sprint race, Switzerland take the lead behind Canada, Portugal, Malaysia, India, Germany, South Africa, Italy, Great Britain and Ireland. New Zealand crash out at start after a collision with USA.

Cong Fu Cheng (China) passes Adam Carroll (Ireland) for 10th in Lap 4 when Neel Jani (Switzerland) score the Fastest lap. Despite efforts from Filipe Albuquerque (Portugal) on Robert Wickens (Canada) and from Michael Ammermüller (Germany) on Narain Karthikeyan (India), the order remained the same until the finish line.

Switzerland win the race with the Fastest lap. Canada take the second position behind Portugal, Malaysia, India, Germany, South Africa, Italy, Great Britain and China. Both Switzerland opponent for the title, France (12th) and New Zealand, doesn't score any points.

| Pos | Team | Driver | Laps | Time | Points |
|---|---|---|---|---|---|
| 1 | Switzerland | Neel Jani | 10 | 15'59.612 | 15+1 |
| 2 | Canada | Robert Wickens | 10 | +4.643 | 12 |
| 3 | Portugal | Filipe Albuquerque | 10 | +5.335 | 10 |
| 4 | Malaysia | Alex Yoong | 10 | +12.169 | 8 |
| 5 | India | Narain Karthikeyan | 10 | +13.068 | 6 |
| 6 | Germany | Michael Ammermüller | 10 | +13.810 | 5 |
| 7 | South Africa | Adrian Zaugg | 10 | +14.999 | 4 |
| 8 | Italy | Edoardo Piscopo | 10 | +15.835 | 3 |
| 9 | (United Kingdom) Great Britain | Robbie Kerr | 10 | +17.120 | 2 |
| 10 | China | Cong Fu Cheng | 10 | +17.692 | 1 |
| 11 | (Republic of Ireland) Ireland | Adam Carroll | 10 | +18.581 | |
| 12 | France | Franck Montagny | 10 | +19.114 | |
| 13 | Czech Republic | Filip Salaquarda | 10 | +21.165 | |
| 14 | Brazil | Alexandre Negrão | 10 | +22.111 | |
| 15 | Australia | John Martin | 10 | +24.363 | |
| 16 | Pakistan | Adam Langley-Khan | 10 | +26.298 | |
| 17 | Netherlands | Jeroen Bleekemolen | 10 | +28.053 | |
| 18 | Lebanon | Jimmy Auby | 10 | +29.029 | |
| 19 | Indonesia | Satrio Hermanto | 10 | +30.196 | |
| 20 | Mexico | Jorge Goeters | 10 | +38.267 | |
| Ret | (United States) USA | Jonathan Summerton | 1 | Collision | |
| Ret | New Zealand | Jonny Reid | 0 | Collision | |

== Main race ==
After the start, USA led, ahead of Switzerland, India, Portugal, Ireland, Malaysia, New Zealand, Great Britain, France and Italy. USA and Switzerland escaped from the rest of the field until the first mandatory pit stops. In Lap 6, Filipe Albuquerque (Portugal) passed for 3rd Narain Karthikeyan (India) in the final hairpin. Adam Carroll (Ireland) try to pass Narain Karthikeyan in the same turn, one lap later, but finally passes him in Lap 8. In Lap 9, the pits are open.
USA, India, Malaysia, New Zealand and Canada pits early, in Lap 10 and Jonny Reid (New Zealand) with a fast stop, exits ahead Alex Yoong (Malaysia) and Narain Karthikeyan (India). USA lead still Switzerland after the stops but the Swiss driver, Neel Jani, lost the second gear of his car. In Lap 15, Jonathan Summerton (USA) is 4.3 seconds ahead of Switzerland. In the next lap, for speeding in the pit lane, Lebanon received a drive-through penalty, five laps then his driver received a 10-second Stop and Go penalty. Portugal was then pushing Switzerland for 2nd position. Ireland close to both drivers and New Zealand it is also faster than Switzerland and comes near in the few next laps. The second pit stop window opens in Lap 24.

Ireland and New Zealand got ahead of Switzerland at the pit stops. In Lap 27, Portugal had the fastest lap. After the pits, USA still led Portugal, Ireland, New Zealand, Switzerland, Malaysia, India, France, Great Britain and Germany. In Lap 33, Robert Wickens (Canada) had the fastest lap.

The victory went to Summerton, who gave his country the honours for the first time. The Yanks' victory made them the 16th nation to win an A1GP race.

| Pos | Team | Driver | Laps | Time | Points |
|---|---|---|---|---|---|
| 1 | (United States) USA | Jonathan Summerton | 38 | 1:02'25.206 | 15 |
| 2 | Portugal | Filipe Albuquerque | 38 | +9.729 | 12 |
| 3 | (Republic of Ireland) Ireland | Adam Carroll | 38 | +15.303 | 10 |
| 4 | New Zealand | Jonny Reid | 38 | +19.533 | 8 |
| 5 | Switzerland | Neel Jani | 38 | +26.193 | 6 |
| 6 | Malaysia | Alex Yoong | 38 | +34.410 | 5 |
| 7 | India | Narain Karthikeyan | 38 | +35.967 | 4 |
| 8 | France | Franck Montagny | 38 | +38.213 | 3 |
| 9 | (United Kingdom) Great Britain | Robbie Kerr | 38 | +39.280 | 2 |
| 10 | Germany | Michael Ammermüller | 38 | +39.890 | 1 |
| 11 | Czech Republic | Filip Salaquarda | 38 | +47.568 | |
| 12 | Italy | Edoardo Piscopo | 38 | +50.348 | |
| 13 | Brazil | Alexandre Negrão | 38 | +50.968 | |
| 14 | Australia | John Martin | 38 | +52.624 | |
| 15 | China | Cong Fu Cheng | 38 | +53.240 | |
| 16 | South Africa | Adrian Zaugg | 38 | +55.629 | |
| 17 | Pakistan | Adam Langley-Khan | 38 | +1'05.352 | |
| 18 | Netherlands | Jeroen Bleekemolen | 38 | +1'14.390 | |
| 19 | Indonesia | Satrio Hermanto | 38 | +1'20.252 | |
| 20 | Canada | Robert Wickens | 38 | +1'21.003 | +1 |
| 21 | Mexico | Jorge Goeters | 37 | +1 lap | |
| 22 | Lebanon | Jimmy Auby | 37 | +1 lap | |

== After race ==
Switzerland and New Zealand are the only team that can win the championship. Switzerland lead with 29 points the season before the last venue in Great Britain.

A1 Team Korea was announced to be part of the next season of the competition. The seat holder will be Joshua Kim of Omnibus Investment and Good EMG support the project. In Shanghai this weekend, a ceremony officialise the participation of South Korea in the 2008-09 season.

== Notes ==
- It was the 31st race weekend (62 starts).
- It was the 3rd venue in Shanghai International Circuit and the 5th in China.
- It was the first race for Jorge Goeters (Mexico), Franck Montagny (France), Alexandre Negrao (Brazil).
- It was the first weekend as Rookie driver for Nathan Antunes (Australia).
- Records:
  - USA and Jonathan Summerton win their first race.
  - Switzerland score 9 pole positions.
  - Lebanon participate on 31 rounds (62 starts) without won points since their first Grand Prix.
  - Neel Jani score 289 points.
  - Jorge Goeters was the oldest driver to start a race at 37 years, 9 month and 18 days.
  - Alex Yoong participate on 28 races (54 starts).
