= Michel Jourdain Jr. =

Mexican racing driver (born 1976)

Michel Jourdain, Jr.
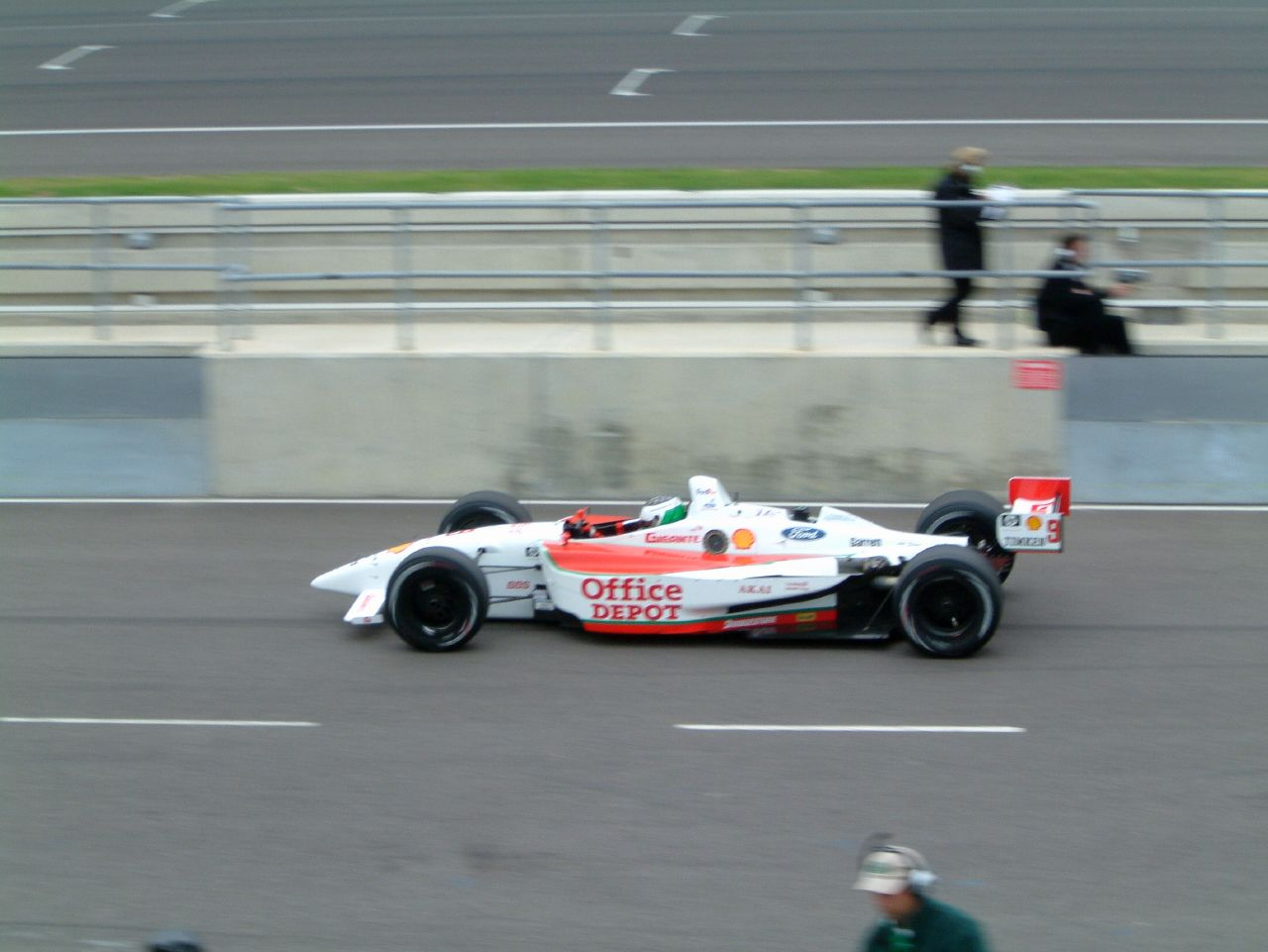
- Jourdain at Rockingham in 2002
- Born: 2 September 1976 (age 50); Mexico City, Mexico

IndyCar Series career
- 4 races run over 3 years
- Best finish: 20th (1996)
- First race: 1996 Dura Lube 200 (Phoenix)
- Last race: 2012 Indianapolis 500 (Indy)
Wins	Podiums	Poles
0	1	0

Champ Car career
- 152 races run over 9 years
- Best finish: 3rd (2003)
- First race: 1996 Grand Prix of Long Beach (Long Beach)
- Last race: 2004 Gran Premio de Mexico (Mexico City)
- First win: 2003 Milwaukee Mile Centennial 250 (Milwaukee)
- Last win: 2003 Molson Indy Montreal (Montreal)
Wins	Podiums	Poles
2	9	1

NASCAR O'Reilly Auto Parts Series career
- 26 races run over 4 years
- Best finish: 37th (2005)
- First race: 2005 Hershey's Take 5 300 (Daytona)
- Last race: 2008 Corona México 200 (Mexico City)
Wins	Top tens	Poles
0	1	0

NASCAR FedEx Freight Truck Series career
- 7 races run over 1 year
- Best finish: 39th (2006)
- First race: 2006 Sam's Town 400 (Texas)
- Last race: 2006 Ford 200 (Homestead)
Wins	Top tens	Poles
0	0	0
- Statistics up to date as of June 13, 2012.

Michel Jourdain Lascurain, better known as Michel Jourdain Jr. (born September 2, 1976), is a Mexican racecar driver who currently competes in the SuperCopa series for Andretti Jourdain Autosport, best known for winning two Champ Car races in 2003. He is the 2020 Super Copa GTM Champion.

== Formula racing ==
Jourdain started racing cars in the Mexican Formula Junior series at the age of twelve. He then moved to the Mexican Formula K and Formula 2 series.

In 1996, Jourdain ran several races in the Indy Racing League (IRL) and the CART (later Champ Car) series, including the Indy 500. At the age of nineteen, he became one of the youngest drivers to race in both Champ Car and the Indy 500. Jourdain raced full-time in Champ Car from 1997 to 2004. In his early years, he was largely considered a back marker; however, after joining the Rahal team in 2002, he became a championship contender. Jourdain ended his Champ Car career in 2004 with one pole, two wins, and nine podium (top-three) finishes.

== NASCAR ==
Jourdain was supported by Mexican sponsors throughout his years in Champ Car. After losing his sponsorship following the 2004 season, Jourdain looked to the NASCAR Busch Series. At the time, NASCAR was trying to expand its fan base among Mexicans and Hispanic Americans.

Jourdain made eighteen starts driving the No. 10 ppc Racing Ford in 2005. He was able to notch one top-ten finish in he early stages of the year. However, in July of that year, ppc Racing announced that the team could not continue with a full season due to insufficient sponsorship. He then ran two races later in the season for Keith Barnwell. Jourdain drove in his home race in Mexico City at Autodromo Hermanos Rodriguez as well as two more races in the No. 15 in 2006 for Jill Burgdoff as well as seven Craftsman Truck Series races in the Roush Racing No. 50 truck.

== WTCC ==
In 2007, Jourdain competed in the FIA World Touring Car Championship for SEAT Sport. A troubled season saw him finish the year down in eighteenth place on points. Later in the year he was signed to drive in the A1GP series for A1 Team Mexico, returning to open-wheel racing for the first time since his Champ Car days.

In 2010, Jordain returned to NASCAR for the Nationwide Series race at Road America when he practiced the No. 98 for Paul Menard since he was away racing at Infineon. Jourdain also competed in the P-WRC class of the 2010 Rally México where he finished seventh in class.

== Rally ==
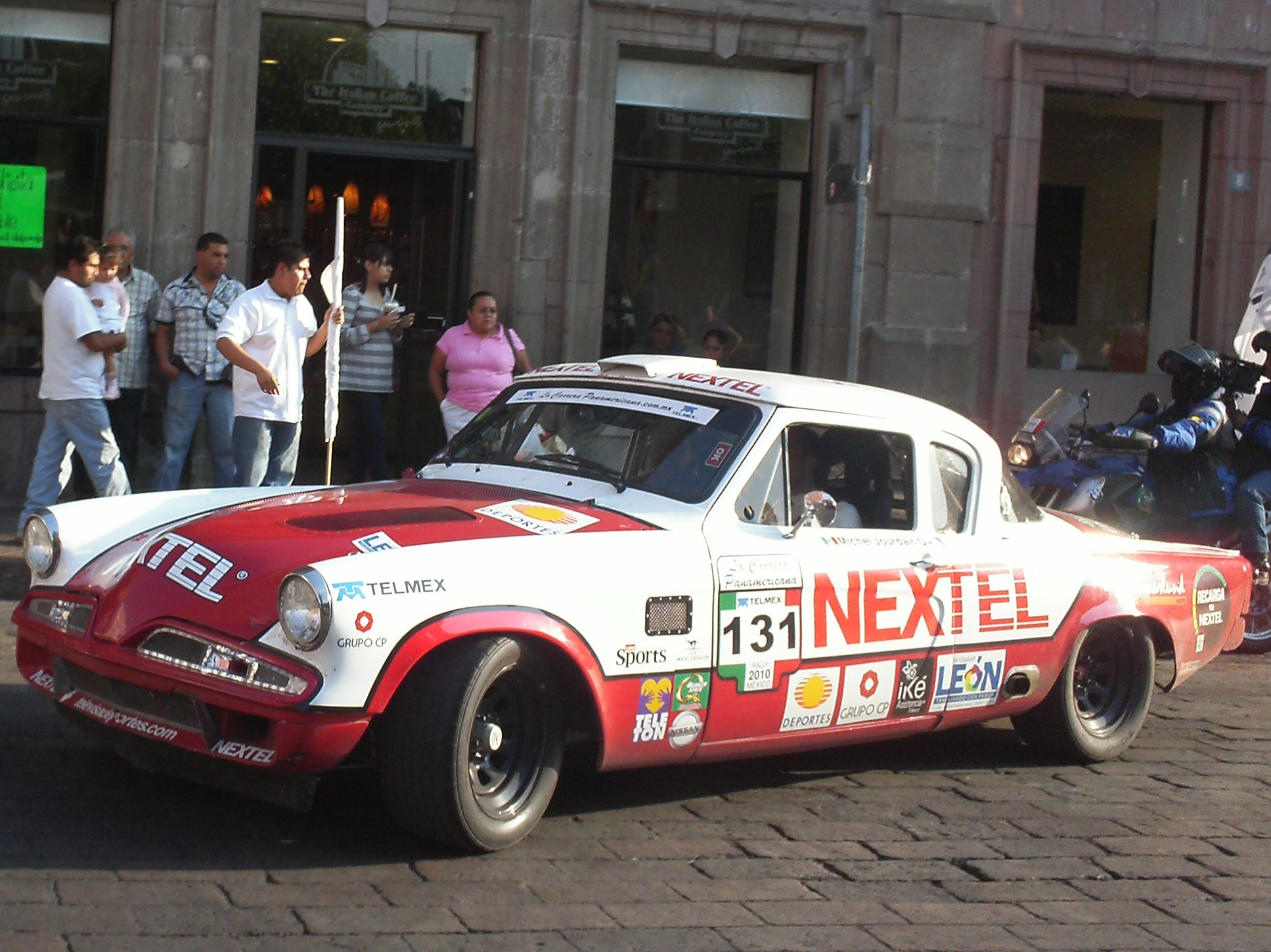
Jourdain, 2nd place in Carrera Panamericana 2010

During the 2003 Baja 1000, Jourdain, supported by girlfriend Ana Paola Romo, raced a SCORE Baja Challenge class vehicle finishing sixth in their class with a time of 31:01.31

In October 2010, Jourdain and his co-driver Miguel Ángel Diez got the second overall in La Carrera Panamericana in a Studebaker 1953, just 12.9 seconds behind from Harri Rovanperä.

The 2010 and 2011 World Rally seasons saw Jourdain start eight rallies with a best finish of fourteenth in the 2011 Rally México.

== Motorsports career results ==
=== American open-wheel racing results ===
(key)

==== IndyCar Series ====
Year	Team	No.	Chassis	Engine	1	2	3	4	5	6	7	8	9	10	11	12	13	14	15	16	17	18	19	Rank	Points	Ref
1996	Team Scandia	22	Lola T95/00	Ford XB	WDW	PHX; 20	INDY; 13																	20th	74	
1996–97	Team Scandia	22	Lola T94/00	Ford XB	NHM	LVS; 2	WDW	PHX	INDY	TXS	PPIR	CLT	NHM	LVS										36th	33	
2012	Rahal Letterman Lanigan Racing	30	Dallara DW12	Honda	STP	ALA	LBH	SAO	INDY; 19	DET	TXS	MIL	IOW	TOR	EDM	MDO	SNM	BAL	FON					32nd	16	
2013	Rahal Letterman Lanigan Racing	17	Dallara DW12	Honda	STP	ALA	LBH	SAO	INDY; DNQ	DET	DET	TXS	MIL	IOW	POC	TOR	TOR	MDO	SNM	BAL	HOU	HOU	FON	NC	0	

==== Indianapolis 500 ====
Year	Chassis	Engine	Start	Finish	Team
1996	Lola	Cosworth-Ford	8	13	Team Scandia
2012	Dallara	Honda	22	19	Rahal Letterman Lanigan Racing
2013	Dallara	Honda	DNQ		Rahal Letterman Lanigan Racing

==== CART/Champ Car ====
(key) (Races in bold indicate pole position)

Year	Team	No.	1	2	3	4	5	6	7	8	9	10	11	12	13	14	15	16	17	18	19	20	Rank	Points	Ref
1996	Dick Simon Racing	22	MIA	RIO	SRF	LBH; 23	NAZ	500	MIL; 23	DET; DNS	POR; 22	CLE	TOR	MCH	MDO	ROA	VAN; 16	LAG; 26					37th	**0**	
1997	Payton Coyne Racing	19	MIA; 18	SRF; 18	LBH; 17	NAZ; 20	RIO; 17	GAT; 16	MIL; 27	DET; 22	POR; 12	CLE; 18	TOR; 13	MCH; 13	MDO; 18	ROA; 20	VAN; 21	LAG; 22	FON; 18				29th	**1**	
1998	Payton Coyne Racing	19	MIA; 28	MOT; 22	LBH; 27	NAZ; 12	RIO; 24	GAT; 17	MIL; 15	DET; 13	POR; 19	CLE; 26	TOR; 18	MCH; 18	MDO; 28	ROA; 14	VAN; 10	LAG; 24	HOU; 25	SRF; 26	FON; 12		24th	**5**	
1999	Payton Coyne Racing	19	MIA; 18	MOT; 18	LBH; 18	NAZ; 16	RIO; 16	GAT; 20	MIL; 16	POR; 20	CLE; 27	ROA; 7	TOR; 21	MCH; 21	DET; 21	MDO; 26	CHI; 18	VAN; 17	LAG; 20	HOU; 18	SRF; 12	FON; 13	25th	**7**	
2000	Bettenhausen Racing	16	MIA; 14	LBH; 11	RIO; 15	MOT; 12	NAZ; 18	MIL; 18	DET; 8	POR; 23	CLE; 22	TOR; 19	MCH; 15	CHI; 11	MDO; 15	ROA; 18	VAN; 23	LAG; 24	GAT; 16	HOU; 18	SRF; 7	FON; 11	22nd	**18**	
2001	Bettenhausen Racing	16	MTY; 17	LBH; 13	NAZ; 13	MOT; 11	MIL; 13	DET; 25	POR; 15	CLE; 25	TOR; 16	MCH; 3	CHI; 23	MDO; 17	ROA; 17	VAN; 6	LAU; 17	ROC; 19	HOU; 25	LAG; 23	SRF; 7	FON; 16	20th	**30**	
2002	Team Rahal	9	MTY; 4	LBH; 4	MOT; 5	MIL; 5	LAG; 9	POR; 6	CHI; 10	TOR; 12	CLE; 9	VAN; 4	MDO; 11	ROA; 9	MTL; 6	DEN; 9	ROC; 11	MIA; 6	SRF; 10	FON; 13	MXC; 13		10th	**105**	
2003	Team Rahal	9	STP; 2	MTY; 2	**LBH**; 15*	BRH; 6	LAU; 3	MIL; 1*	LAG; 4	POR; 12	CLE; 7	TOR; 2	VAN; 4	ROA; 16	MDO; 4	MTL; 1	DEN; 6	MIA; 7	MXC; 4	SRF; 4			3rd	**195**	
2004	RuSPORT	9	LBH; 11	MTY; 11	MIL; 3	POR; 14	CLE; 15	TOR; 15	VAN; 2	ROA; 9	DEN; 14	MTL; 6	LAG; 4	LSV; 11	SRF; 17	MXC; 9							12th	**185**^	

- ^ New points system implemented in 2004.

=== Complete World Touring Car Championship results ===
(key) (Races in bold indicate pole position) (Races in italics indicate fastest lap)

Year	Team	Car	1	2	3	4	5	6	7	8	9	10	11	12	13	14	15	16	17	18	19	20	21	22	DC	Points
2007	SEAT Sport	SEAT León	BRA; 1; 12	BRA; 2; 15	NED; 1; 15	NED; 2; 16	ESP; 1; 6	ESP; 2; 9	FRA; 1; 12	FRA; 2 Ret	CZE; 1; 11	CZE; 2; 13	POR; 1; 12	POR; 2; 9	SWE; 1 Ret	SWE; 2; 12	GER; 1; 12	GER; 2; 9	GBR; 1; 19	GBR; 2; 13	ITA; 1; 14	ITA; 2; 13	MAC; 1	MAC; 2	18th	3

=== Complete A1 Grand Prix results ===
(key)

Year	Entrant	1	2	3	4	5	6	7	8	9	10	11	12	13	14	15	16	17	18	19	20	DC	Points
2007–08	A1 Team Mexico	NED; SPR	NED; FEA	CZE; SPR; 13	CZE; FEA; 22	MYS; SPR; 20	MYS; FEA; 11	ZHU; SPR	ZHU; FEA	NZL; SPR	NZL; FEA	AUS; SPR	AUS; FEA	RSA; SPR	RSA; FEA	MEX; SPR	MEX; FEA	SHA; SPR	SHA; FEA	GBR; SPR	GBR; SPR	16th	22

=== WRC results ===
Year	Entrant	Car	1	2	3	4	5	6	7	8	9	10	11	12	13	WDC	Points
2010	Michel Jourdain	Mitsubishi Lancer Evo IX	SWE	MEX; 19	JOR	TUR										NC	0
2010	Nextel-Televisa Deportes WRT	Mitsubishi Lancer Evo IX					NZL; Ret	POR	BUL	FIN; 60		JPN; Ret				NC	0
2010	Nextel-Televisa Deportes WRT	Mitsubishi Lancer Evo X									GER; Ret		FRA; 38	ESP	GBR; 26	NC	0
2011	Michel Jourdain	Mitsubishi Lancer Evo IX	SWE	MEX; 14	POR	JOR	ITA	ARG	GRE	FIN	GER	AUS	FRA	ESP	GBR	NC	0

=== NASCAR ===
(key) (Bold – Pole position awarded by qualifying time. Italics – Pole position earned by points standings or practice time. * – Most laps led.)

==== Nationwide Series ====
NASCAR Nationwide Series results
Year	Team	No.	Make	1	2	3	4	5	6	7	8	9	10	11	12	13	14	15	16	17	18	19	20	21	22	23	24	25	26	27	28	29	30	31	32	33	34	35	NNSC	Pts	Ref
2005	ppc Racing	10	Ford	DAY; 25	CAL; 25	MXC; 37	LVS; 40	ATL; 10	NSH; 22	BRI; 32	TEX; 20	PHO; 37	TAL; 30	DAR; 41	RCH; 21	CLT; 15	DOV; 41	NSH; 40	KEN; 23	MLW; 30	DAY; 39	CHI; DNQ	NHA	PPR	GTY	IRP	GLN	MCH	BRI										37th	1517	
2005	ppc Racing	15	Ford																											CAL; 25	RCH	DOV	KAN; 30	CLT; DNQ	MEM	TEX	PHO	HOM	37th	1517	
2006	ppc Racing	15	Ford	DAY	CAL	MXC; 38	LVS	ATL	BRI	TEX	NSH	PHO	TAL	RCH	DAR	CLT	DOV	NSH	KEN; 18	MLW	DAY	CHI	NHA	MAR	GTY	IRP	GLN; 39	MCH	BRI	CAL	RCH	DOV	KAN	CLT	MEM	TEX	PHO	HOM	91st	214	
2007	Roush Fenway Racing	17	Ford	DAY	CAL	MXC; 25	LVS	ATL	BRI	NSH	TEX	PHO	TAL	RCH	DAR	CLT	DOV	NSH	KEN	MLW	NHA	DAY	CHI	GTY	IRP	CGV; 16	GLN	MCH	BRI	CAL	RCH	DOV	KAN	CLT	MEM	TEX	PHO	HOM	107th	203	
2008	Braun Racing	32	Toyota	DAY	CAL	LVS	ATL	BRI	NSH	TEX	PHO	MXC; 36	TAL	RCH	DAR	CLT	DOV	NSH	KEN	MLW	NHA	DAY	CHI	GTY	IRP	CGV	GLN	MCH	BRI	CAL	RCH	DOV	KAN	CLT	MEM	TEX	PHO	HOM	134th	55	
2011	Roush Fenway Racing	16	Ford	DAY	PHO	LVS	BRI	CAL	TEX	TAL	NSH	RCH	DAR	DOV	IOW	CLT	CHI	MCH	ROA	DAY	KEN	NHA	NSH	IRP	IOW	GLN	CGV; QL^{†}	BRI	ATL	RCH	CHI	DOV	KAN	CLT	TEX	PHO	HOM		NA	0	
^{†} - Qualified for Trevor Bayne·

==== Craftsman Truck Series ====
NASCAR Craftsman Truck Series results
Year	Team	No.	Make	1	2	3	4	5	6	7	8	9	10	11	12	13	14	15	16	17	18	19	20	21	22	23	24	25	NCTC	Pts	Ref
2006	Roush Racing	50	Ford	DAY	CAL	ATL	MAR	GTY	CLT	MFD; DNQ	DOV	TEX; 13	MCH	MLW; DNQ	KAN; 32	KEN; 26	MEM	IRP; 19	NSH	BRI	NHA	LVS; 30	TAL	MAR	ATL	TEX; 24	PHO	HOM; 31	39th	616	

=== Complete TCR World Tour results ===
(key) (Races in bold indicate pole position) (Races in italics indicate fastest lap)

Year	Team	Car	1	2	3	4	5	6	7	8	9	10	11	12	13	14	15	16	17	18	19	20	21	DC	Points
2025	Peralta Racing Team	Cupra León VZ TCR	AHR; 1; 8	AHR; 2; 8	AHR; 3; 7	CRT; 1	CRT; 2	CRT; 3	MNZ; 1	MNZ; 2	CVR; 1	CVR; 2	BEN; 1	BEN; 2	BEN; 3	INJ; 1	INJ; 2	INJ; 3	ZHZ; 1	ZHZ; 2	ZHZ; 3	MAC; 1	MAC; 2	18th	38
