= Robert Wickens =

Canadian racing driver (born 1989)

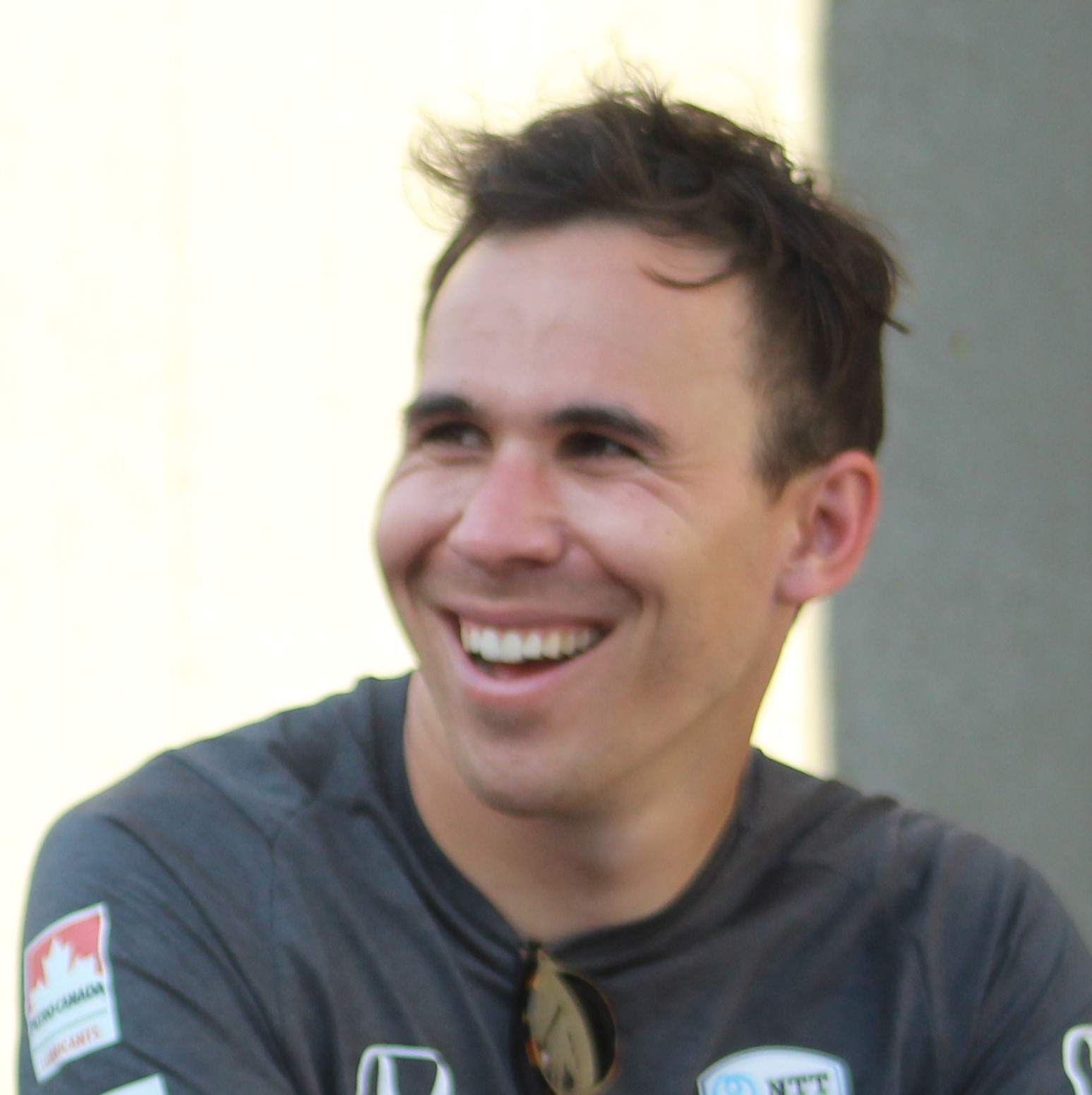
- Wickens at the 2019 Indianapolis 500
- Nationality: (Canada) Canadian
- Born: Robert Tyler Wickens; March 13, 1989 (age 37); Guelph, Ontario, Canada

IndyCar Series career
- 14 races run over 1 year
- First race: 2018 Firestone Grand Prix of St. Petersburg (Streets of St. Petersburg)
- Last race: 2018 ABC Supply 500 (Pocono)
Wins	Podiums	Poles
0	4	1

IMSA SportsCar Championship career
- Debut season: 2017
- Current team: DXDT Racing
- Categorisation: FIA Platinum (until 2021); FIA Gold (2022); FIA Silver (2023–)
- Car number: 36
- Former teams: Starworks Motorsport
- Starts: 11
- Wins: 0
- Podiums: 0
- Poles: 1
- Fastest laps: 0
- Best finish: 23rd in 2017, 2025

Previous series
- 2022-2024 2012–2017 2011 2010 2009 2009 2008–09 2007–08 2007 2007–08 2006 2006 2005–06: Michelin Pilot Challenge; DTM; Formula Renault 3.5 Series; GP3 Series; FIA Formula Two; British Formula 3 Formula 3 Euro Series; A1 Grand Prix; Champ Car Atlantic; World Series by Renault; Formula BMW ADAC; Eurocup Formula Renault 2.0; Formula BMW USA

Championship titles
- 2023 2011 2006: IMSA Michelin Pilot Challenge - TCR; Formula Renault 3.5 Series; Formula BMW USA

Awards
- 2018 IndyCar Series Rookie of the Year; BBC Rising Star Award; INSIDE TRACK Canadian Racing Competing At The Highest Levels of International Competition

Robert Tyler Wickens (born March 13, 1989) is a Canadian racing driver from Guelph, Ontario, driving in the Sprint Cup of the IMSA SportsCar Championship for DXDT Racing. In 2009 he finished in second place in the FIA Formula Two Championship, and in 2010 he was runner-up in the GP3 Series. In his return to Formula Renault 3.5, where he competed in 2008, he won the 2011 season championship with Carlin Motorsport, with backing of Marussia. Wickens then left the series to race in the DTM for the HWA Team.

Wickens left DTM after the 2017 season and signed to drive for Schmidt Peterson Motorsports in the 2018 IndyCar Series, going on to claim pole position in his debut race at the 2018 St. Petersburg Grand Prix. His promising debut IndyCar season came to a premature end when a violent crash during the 500-mile race at Pocono left him a paraplegic. Wickens issued a further statement clarifying that he was hopeful to be able to walk again, due to his spinal cord being bruised rather than completely severed and that he had felt 'some feeling and movement' back in his legs although the nerves were not in a state to walk. Though a paraplegic as of late October 2018, he hoped to be able to walk on his own within two years of the accident.

In 2022, Wickens returned to full-time racing in the Michelin Pilot Challenge with Bryan Herta Autosport, driving a Hyundai car with adapted hand controls in the TCR category. He won the TCR drivers' championship in 2023 alongside his teammate, Harry Gottsacker.

== Career ==
=== Karting ===
Wickens started his karting career in 2001 with wins in the Junior Heavy Marigold Fall Classic and the Junior Lite Iron Man Enduro. He was three-time champion of the Sunoco Ron Fellows Karting Championship in 2002, 2003, and 2005 in various classes. He also won races in ASN Canadian National Formula Junior, SKUSA ProMoto Tour, BeaveRun, PA, 80cc Junior OKRA Grand National, and Junior Heavy Mosport Grand Prix.

=== Formula BMW ===
In 2005, when he was sixteen years old, Wickens started his formula racing career. Thanks to Junior Scholarship from BMW, he participated in Formula BMW USA for Team Apex Racing USA. He scored five podiums including two wins, which brought him third place and best rookie's title. Also he competed in Formula BMW World Final, where he finished sixth.

Wickens remained in the series in 2006 for the same team, but after few races switched to the EuroInternational, because he became a Red Bull Junior Team driver. The Canadian amassed three wins, seven podiums and won the championship. Besides repeat appearance in Formula BMW World Final, Wickens was guest driver at the Nürburgring Formula BMW ADAC round, which was a support race for the Formula One European Grand Prix. After three months he again appeared at Nürburg to competing in the Eurocup Formula Renault 2.0 for Motopark Academy.

=== Champ Car Atlantic ===
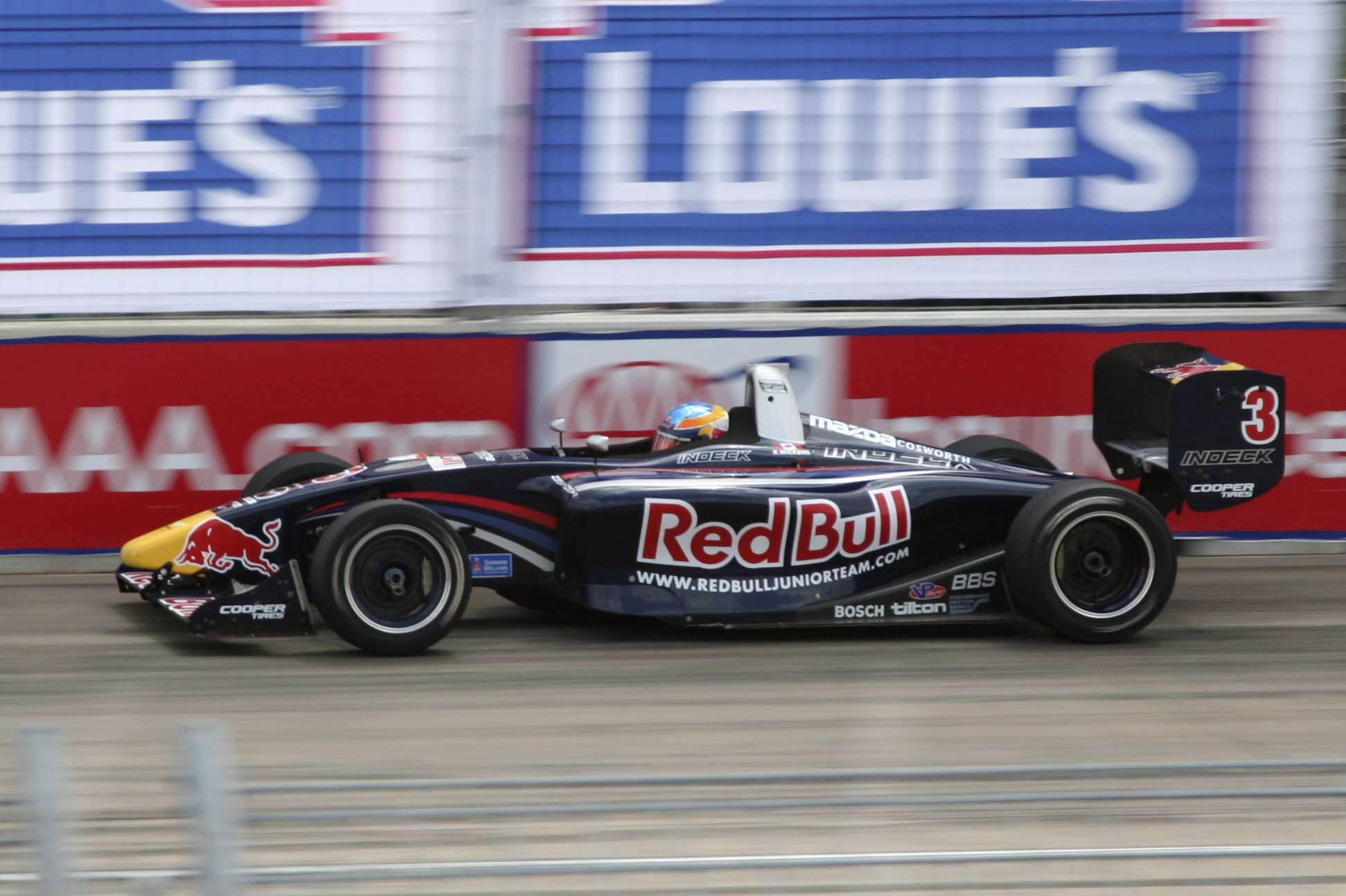
Wickens driving for the Red Bull Junior Team at Houston during the 2007 Champ Car Atlantic season.

In 2007, Wickens moved to the Champ Car Atlantic for Red Bull/Team Forsythe. He took one win and another three podiums and was third in season standings, yielding Raphael Matos and Franck Perera.

=== Formula Renault 3.5 Series ===
After four races at the end of the 2007 season, Wickens moved up to the Formula Renault 3.5 Series for the 2008 season, with Carlin Motorsport. He claimed one win at Silverstone and finished season on the twelfth place with 55 points.

=== Formula 3 Euro Series ===
Apart from involvement in the Formula Renault 3.5 Series, in 2008, Wickens competed in Formula 3 Euro Series with Signature-Plus, missing the Hockenheim, Mugello and Brands Hatch rounds. His best results came at the second, rainy races on the Norisring and Bugatti Circuit, where he won. Both times, due to insufficient distance covered, half points were awarded. He continued his participation in 2009, but switched to Kolles & Heinz Union and only competed in the Hockenheim and Dijon rounds, failing to score a point.

=== FIA Formula Two Championship ===
Wickens was the only North American driver in the revamped FIA Formula Two Championship for the 2009 season, driving car number 12. Wickens dominated the opening race of the series, leading every lap from pole position to become the first driver since Philippe Streiff in September 1984 to win an international Formula Two race. He repeated that in race two, to lead the championship. However, those were his only two wins of the season, as he struggled with reliability later in the season. Despite five retirements, Wickens ended up as the runner-up in the championship, albeit 51 points behind runaway champion Andy Soucek.

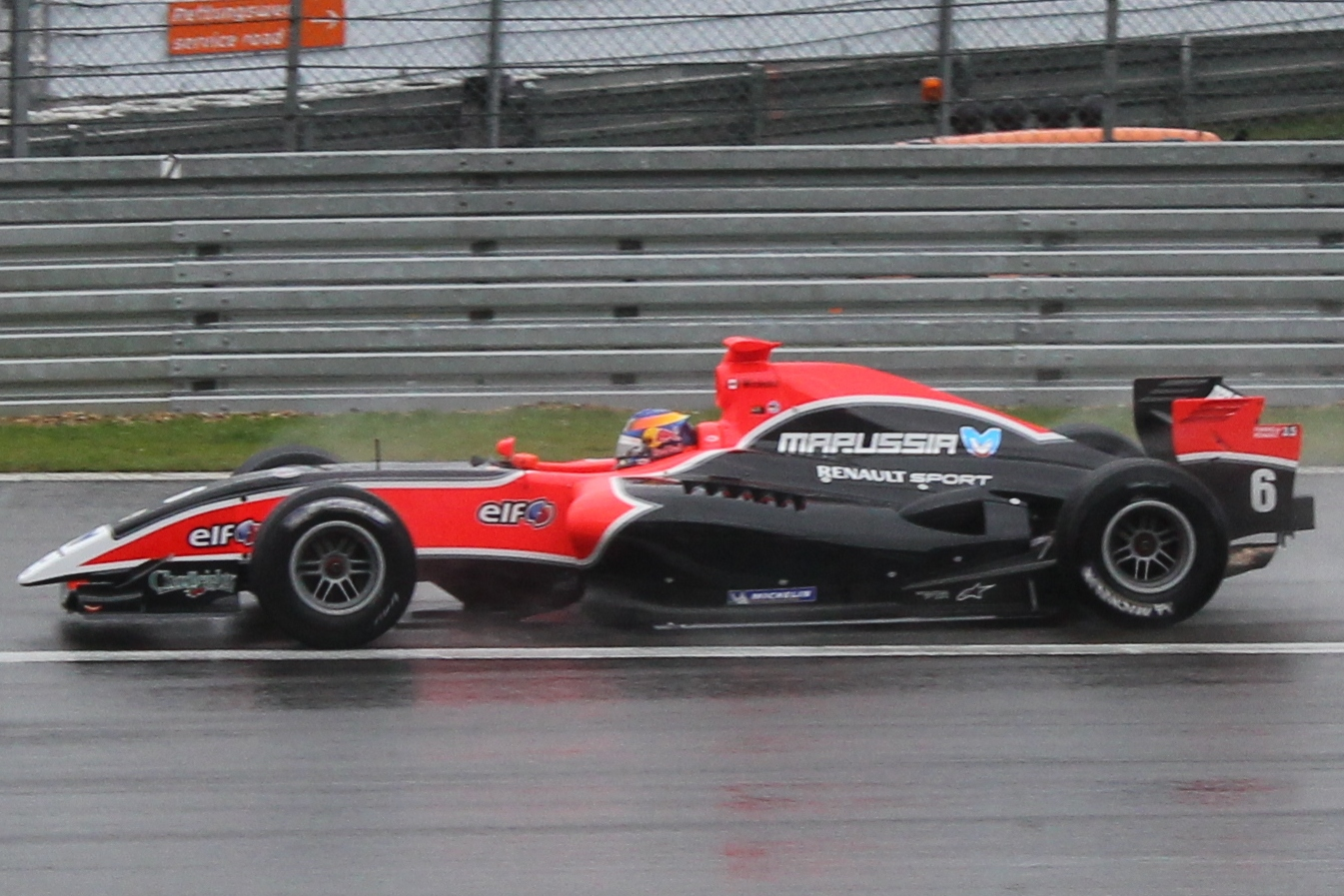
Robert Wickens at the 2011 Nürburgring World series by Renault round

In November 2009, Wickens revealed that he had held "off the record" talks with several Formula 1 teams, and believed that his chances of driving in Formula 1 were increased by the fact that he was the only potential rookie North American driver who currently holds a valid FIA superlicence.

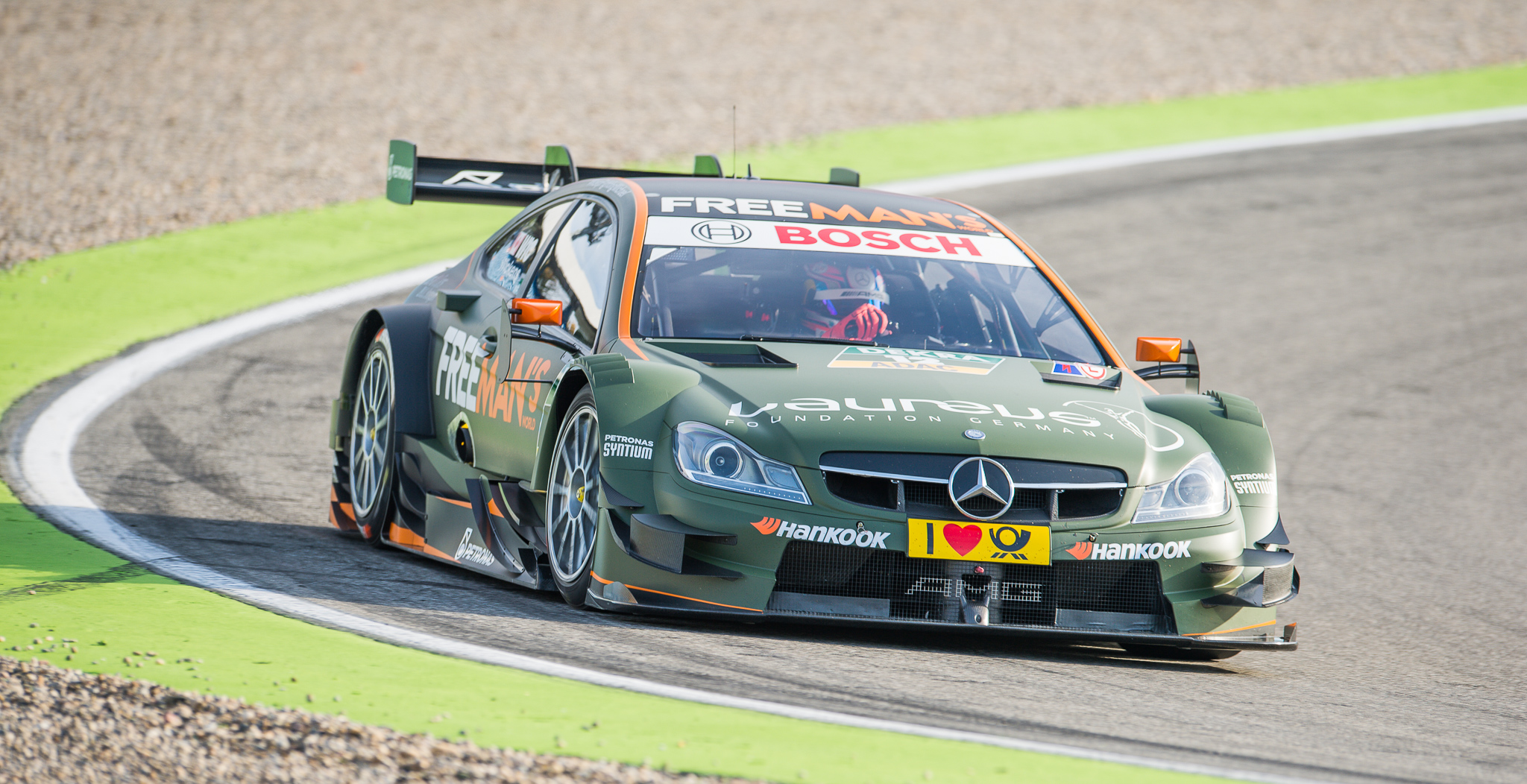
Wickens competing at the Hockenheimring during the finale of the 2014 Deutsche Tourenwagen Masters.

=== GP3 Series ===
In 2010, Wickens raced in the GP3 Series with Status Grand Prix. After getting third place in Barcelona qualifying, a good start and Nigel Melker retiring on the opening lap upped him to second place in the first race. In the second race, he started from seventh place and made his way up to fourth, which allowed him to lead the driver's standings.

=== Formula Renault 3.5 Series ===
Wickens was crowned the champion of the series in 2011, after edging out teammate Jean-Éric Vergne at the final race.

=== Formula One ===
In June 2011, Wickens was signed by Virgin Racing as their official reserve driver. He had his debut for the team in September, undertaking straight line testing at Variano, completing over 200 km in the MVR-02. At the 2011 Abu Dhabi Grand Prix, Wickens completed the first free practice session of the weekend. Following conclusion of the season, he remained at the circuit for the young driver test competing for both Marussia Virgin Racing and the Lotus Renault GP team.

=== DTM ===
On April 3, 2012, Mercedes announced the revival of the Mercedes-Benz Junior Team that has guided several notable drivers in their racing careers like Heinz-Harald Frentzen, Karl Wendlinger and Michael Schumacher. With that announcement came the news that Wickens, together with the Formula 3 Euro Series champion Roberto Merhi and DTM-sophomore Christian Vietoris, would become a part of the new Junior Team and that the three of them would drive for the Junior Team in the 2012 DTM season. In addition to that, seven-time F1 World Champion Michael Schumacher was involved with the three drivers by serving as a mentor. Wickens' entry into the DTM meant that he would be one of two Canadians in the drivers field, together with Bruno Spengler.

=== IndyCar ===
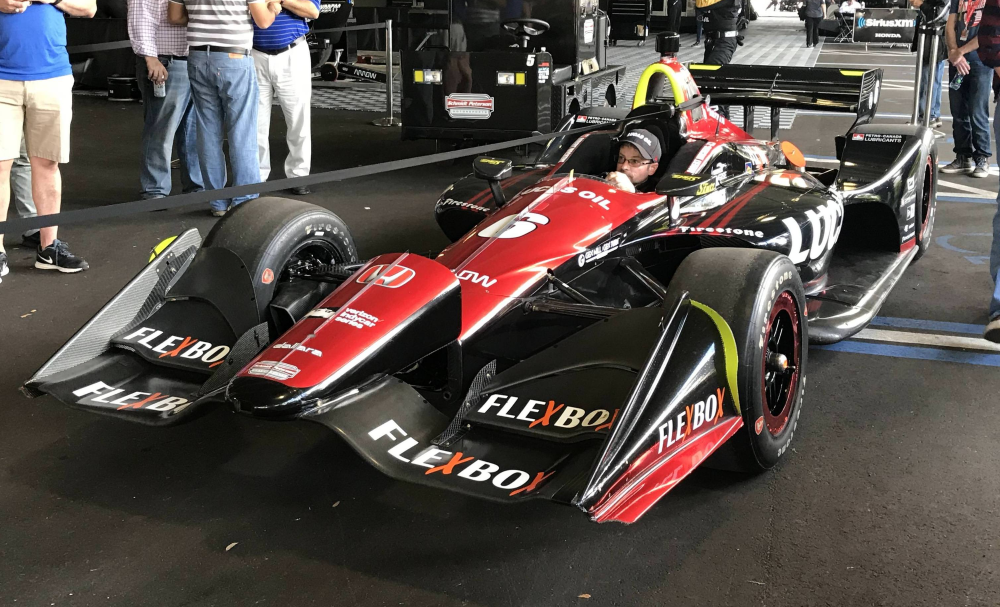
Wickens car at Saint Petersburg in 2018 before the race.

In June 2017, Wickens joined Schmidt Peterson Motorsports for the IndyCar Series' Kohler Grand Prix at Road America. He drove the No. 7 car during practice in place of Mikhail Aleshin, who had competed in the 24 Hours of Le Mans a week prior and was unable to return to the United States in time for the start of the Grand Prix weekend due to problems surrounding his immigration visa.

It was announced in October 2017 that Wickens would be joining the team full-time for the 2018 season.

Wickens would go on to claim pole position in his debut qualifying session on March 10, 2018, for the 2018 Firestone Grand Prix of St. Petersburg. After Wickens led the race for all but the last two laps, Alexander Rossi made a move for the lead and a racing incident ensued, taking Wickens out of the lead, which led to Sébastien Bourdais winning the race.

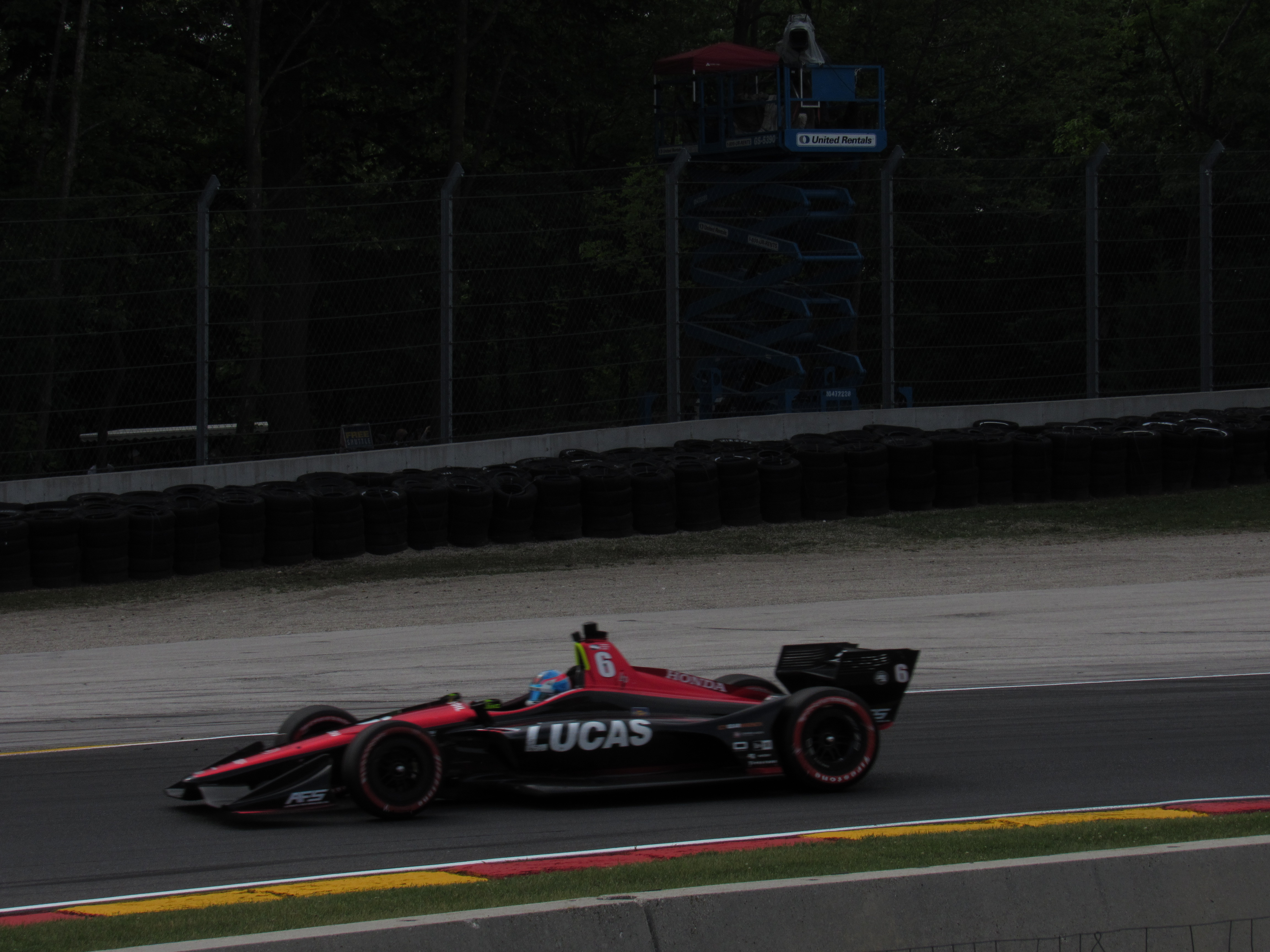
Wickens finished fifth at the 2018 Kohler Grand Prix.

In May 2018, Wickens was awarded Indianapolis 500 Rookie of the Year honors after leading two laps and finishing ninth during the race.

Wickens came in fifth at the July 11, 2018, Iowa Corn 300 race at Iowa Speedway, his fifth finish in the top-five for the season to that date, and finished the 85-lap Honda Indy Toronto race on July 15, 2018, in third place. Later in the month, Wickens again finished second at Mid-Ohio only to Rossi this time. Wickens had climbed up to sixth place in the standings.

=== Pocono accident ===
Wickens crashed violently during the 2018 ABC Supply 500 at Pocono Raceway on August 19, 2018. After a restart on lap 7, Wickens drew side by side with Ryan Hunter-Reay on the run down the back straight into turn 2. Neither driver backed out and they touched wheels, turning Hunter-Reay across the front of Wickens' car, which as a result then launched Wickens' car over the nose of Hunter-Reay's Andretti Autosport machine and into the catchfencing. Wickens' car broke apart upon impact with the catchfence, shearing all four tires and most of the car's bodywork from its chassis, although the drivers' safety cell remained intact. The cockpit's tub then spun off of the top of the SAFER barrier and landed back on the track and slid to a stop on the straight just beyond turn 2. The crash initiated a multi-car pile up which eliminated Hunter-Reay, Wickens' teammate James Hinchcliffe, Takuma Sato and Pietro Fittipaldi. All were checked out by the on-site medical staff and required no further immediate treatment.

The race was red flagged while Wickens was extricated from the car, with Indycar officials stating he was "awake and alert", before being transferred to hospital by helicopter. Subsequent reports indicated that Wickens was admitted to Lehigh Valley Hospital–Cedar Crest with fractures to his legs, spine and right forearm in addition to pulmonary contusion. After an MRI scan, Wickens underwent spinal surgery to repair a thoracic spinal fracture on August 20; titanium rods and screws were inserted in his spine. Further surgeries were completed to treat fractures in his arm and legs. On August 31, Wickens was transferred to Indiana University Health Methodist Hospital for further surgery on his legs. On September 7, 2018, the Wickens family announced the full extent of Robert's injuries: a thoracic spinal fracture, a neck fracture, tibia and fibula fractures to both legs, fractures in both hands, a fractured right forearm, a fractured elbow, four fractured ribs, a pulmonary contusion, and an indeterminate spinal injury. While at a rehab facility in Colorado, Wickens revealed in late October he was a paraplegic as a result of the crash.

Several factors helped Wickens survive: he ducked down so his head did not hit any solid object, the cockpit did not strike the steel pole, and forces of the impact were dissipated in the destruction of the car, sparing Wickens.

Wickens' car was withdrawn from the Bommarito Automotive Group 500, while teammate James Hinchcliffe, also involved in the accident, was cleared to race. The No. 6 car did return to the track at Portland with Carlos Muñoz behind the wheel of the car. In a press release on September 6, owners Sam Schmidt and Ric Peterson said: "the 6 is his when he comes back". The second car was renumbered to 7 for the 2019 season where Marcus Ericsson drove the car. Despite this press statement, the No. 6 car did make a brief return during the 2022 season, when it was driven by Juan Pablo Montoya at Indianapolis before making a full return to the sport from 2023 onwards.

Despite missing the final three races of the 2018 season, Wickens had already collected enough points to earn the 2018 IndyCar Rookie of the Year award.

=== Recovery ===
On 21 November 2018, Wickens published a video of him walking a few steps with machine assistance during his rehab, showcasing the movement of his legs.

On 30 January 2019, Wickens published another video showing him riding a spin bike on his own and without any assistance.

On 8 July 2019, Wickens announced he would be driving the parade lap for the Honda Indy Toronto, using hand controls.

During the COVID-19 pandemic, Wickens competed in the INDYCAR iRacing Challenge, with a best result of 5th at Motegi. He also drove at the 2020 24 Hours of Le Mans Virtual with Mahle Racing alongside DTM racer Ferdinand Zvonimir von Habsburg and sim racers Jimmy Broadbent and Kevin Rotting in the GTE Class with the Aston Martin Vantage GTE. They finished 16th in the GTE class and 45th in the overall classification

On 5 May 2021, 989 days after the accident at Pocono, Wickens drove a race car again, testing the No. 54 Hyundai Veloster N TCR with Bryan Herta Autosport at Mid-Ohio Sports Car Course. Outfitted with hand controls, normally raced by paralyzed team driver Michael Johnson, Wickens wasted no time adapting to the set-up and was up to pace within a number of laps, proving his speed and ability to race again.

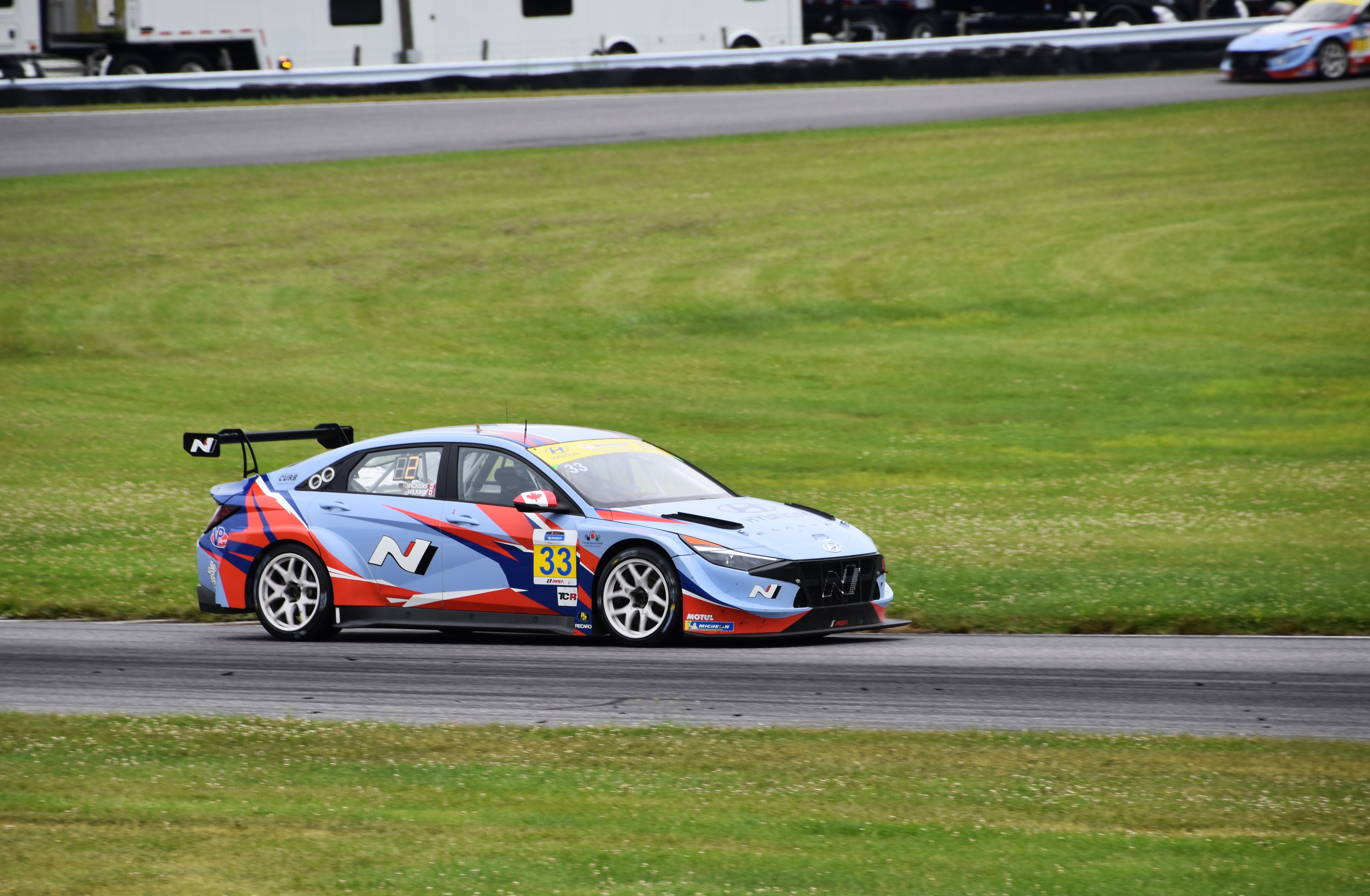
Wickens driving at Lime Rock Park during the 2022 Michelin Pilot Challenge season.

=== Return to racing ===
On 14 January 2022, it was announced that Wickens would compete in the 2022 Michelin Pilot Challenge with Bryan Herta Autosport. This was Wickens' first return to racing since his accident at Pocono. In his first race at Daytona, Wickens and co-driver Mark Wilkins scored a podium with a third-place finish. On 25 June 2022, Wickens and Wilkins won the TCR class of the Michelin Pilot Challenge race at Watkins Glen International, Wickens' first race victory since 2017. He then followed this up with a win at Canadian Tire Motorsport Park in the following race. At the end of the season, Wickens finished in sixth place in the Touring Car (TCR) Drivers' championship.

Wickens remained in the team for 2023, paired with Harry Gottsacker. A consistent season with several podium finishes saw the pair claim the TCR championship at the last race in Road Atlanta.

During the first race of the 2024 Nürburgring Langstrecken-Serie at the Nordschleife, Wickens was involved in an accident driving a Hyundai Elantra N, approximately half way through the 4 hour event at the Döttinger Höhe section of the circuit. The crash required him to be taken immediately to a nearby hospital from the circuit. His team, Bryan Herta Autosport, released a statement confirming Wickens was conscious and would spend the night under precautionary observation.

== Personal life ==
Wickens is the son of Tim and Lisa, and has an older brother, Trevor, who operated Hamilton-based kart racing team Prime Powerteam. Wickens cited he was fascinated by the movie Days of Thunder as a child. On 28 September 2019, Wickens married Wasaga Beach native Karli Woods in a ceremony held in Carmel, Indiana. In July 2022, the pair had their first child, Wesley Joseph. In September 2025, they welcomed twins, Daisy and Dasher.

== Racing record ==
=== Career summary ===
Season	Series	Team	Races	Wins	Poles	F/Laps	Podiums	Points	Position
2005	Formula BMW USA	Team Apex Racing USA	14	2	1	2	5	122	**3rd**
2005	Formula BMW World Final	Team Autotecnica	1	0	0	0	0	N/A	6th
2006	Formula BMW USA	EuroInternational; Team Apex Racing USA	14	3	3	3	7	149	**1st**
2006	Formula BMW ADAC	ADAC Berlin-Brandenburg	2	0	0	0	0	N/A	NC†
2006	Eurocup Formula Renault 2.0	Motopark Academy	2	0	0	0	0	N/A	NC†
2006	Formula BMW World Final	EuroInternational	1	0	0	0	0	N/A	8th
2007	Champ Car Atlantic	Red Bull/Team Forsythe	12	1	1	2	4	255	**3rd**
2007	Formula Renault 3.5 Series	Carlin Motorsport	4	0	0	0	0	6	25th
2007–08	A1 Grand Prix	A1 Team Canada	14	1	2	1	4	75	9th
2008	Formula Renault 3.5 Series	Carlin Motorsport	17	1	1	3	4	55	12th
2008	Formula 3 Euro Series	Signature-Plus	14	1	0	0	2	10.5	15th
2009	FIA Formula Two Championship	Motorsport Vision	16	2	5	3	6	64	**2nd**
2009	Formula 3 Euro Series	Kolles & Heinz Union	4	0	0	0	0	0	NC
2009	British Formula 3 International Series	Carlin Motorsport	2	0	0	0	1	12	16th
2009	Atlantic Championship	Genoa Racing	1	0	0	0	0	12	14th
2010	GP3 Series	Status Grand Prix	16	3	1	2	7	71	**2nd**
2011	Formula Renault 3.5 Series	Carlin Motorsport	17	5	7	4	10	241	**1st**
2011	Formula One	Marussia Virgin Racing	Test driver						
2012	Deutsche Tourenwagen Masters	Mücke Motorsport	10	0	0	0	0	14	16th
2013	Deutsche Tourenwagen Masters	HWA Team	10	1	1	0	3	70	5th
2014	Deutsche Tourenwagen Masters	HWA Team	10	1	2	0	1	41	12th
2015	Deutsche Tourenwagen Masters	HWA AG	18	1	0	1	2	61	13th
2016	Deutsche Tourenwagen Masters	Mercedes-Benz DTM Team HWA I	18	2	1	3	5	124	4th
2017	Deutsche Tourenwagen Masters	Mercedes-AMG Motorsport Mercedes Me	18	1	1	1	4	119	9th
2017	IMSA SportsCar Championship - PC	Starworks Motorsport	1	0	0	0	0	26	23rd
2017	IndyCar Series	Schmidt Peterson Motorsports	Test driver						
2018	IndyCar Series	Schmidt Peterson Motorsports	14	0	1	0	4	391	11th
2022	Michelin Pilot Challenge - TCR	Bryan Herta Autosport with Curb-Agajanian	10	2	1	1	3	2500	6th
2023	Michelin Pilot Challenge - TCR	Bryan Herta Autosport with Curb-Agajanian	10	0	1	0	7	3010	**1st**
2024	Michelin Pilot Challenge - TCR	Bryan Herta Autosport with Curb-Agajanian	10	1	3	0	6	2880	**3rd**
2024	Nürburgring Langstrecken-Serie - TCR	Target Competition	1	0	0	0	0	0	NC
2025	IMSA SportsCar Championship - GTD	DXDT Racing	5	0	0	0	0	1226	23rd
2025	Nürburgring Langstrecken-Serie - TCR	Hyundai Motorsport N	1	0	0	0	0	0	NC
2026	IMSA SportsCar Championship - GTD	DXDT Racing	5	0	1	0	0	1133	33rd

^{†} As Wickens was a guest driver, he was ineligible to score points.

=== Complete Eurocup Formula Renault 2.0 results ===
(key) (Races in bold indicate pole position; races in italics indicate fastest lap)

Year	Entrant	1	2	3	4	5	6	7	8	9	10	11	12	13	14	DC	Points
2006	Motopark Academy	ZOL; 1	ZOL; 2	IST; 1	IST; 2	MIS; 1	MIS; 2	NÜR; 1; 18	NÜR; 2; 17	DON; 1	DON; 2	LMS; 1	LMS; 2	CAT; 1	CAT; 2	36th	0

=== American open-wheel racing results ===
(key)

==== Atlantic Championship ====
Year	Team	1	2	3	4	5	6	7	8	9	10	11	12	Rank	Points
2007	Red Bull Forsythe Racing	**LVG**; 2	LBH; 3	HOU; 10	POR; 1	POR; 4	CLE; 5	MTT; 5	TOR; 7	EDM; 4	EDM; 10	SJO; 3	ROA; 7	**3rd**	**255**
2009	Genoa Racing	SEB	UTA	NJ1	NJ2	LIM	ACC	ACC	MOH	TRR	MOS; 4	ATL	LS	**14th**	**12**

==== IndyCar Series ====
(key)

Year	Team	No.	Chassis	Engine	1	2	3	4	5	6	7	8	9	10	11	12	13	14	15	16	17	Rank	Points	Ref
2017	Schmidt Peterson Motorsports	7	Dallara DW12	Honda	STP	LBH	ALA	PHX	IMS	INDY	DET	DET	TXS	ROA; PO	IOW	TOR	MOH	POC	GTW	WGL	SNM	NC	–	
2018	Schmidt Peterson Motorsports	6	Dallara DW12	Honda	**STP**; 18	PHX; 2	LBH; 22	ALA; 4	IMS; 3	INDY; 9	DET; 8	DET; 6	TXS; 19	RDA; 5	IOW; 5	TOR; 3	MOH; 2	POC; 19	GTW	POR	SNM	11th	391	

==== Indianapolis 500 ====
Year	Chassis	Engine	Start	Finish	Team
2018	Dallara	Honda	18	9	Schmidt Peterson Motorsports

=== Complete Formula Renault 3.5 Series results ===
(key) (Races in bold indicate pole position) (Races in italics indicate fastest lap)

Year	Entrant	1	2	3	4	5	6	7	8	9	10	11	12	13	14	15	16	17	DC	Points
2007	Carlin Motorsport	MNZ; 1	MNZ; 2	NÜR; 1	NÜR; 2	MON; 1	HUN; 1	HUN; 2	SPA; 1	SPA; 2	DON; 1	DON; 2	MAG; 1	MAG; 2	EST; 1; 12	EST; 2; 10	CAT; 1; 7	CAT; 2; 11	25th	6
2008	Carlin Motorsport	MNZ; 1 Ret	MNZ; 2 Ret	SPA; 1; 14	SPA; 2 Ret	MON; 1; 19	SIL; 1; 9	**SIL**; **2**; 1	HUN; 1 Ret	HUN; 2; 8	NÜR; 1; 13	NÜR; 2; 18	LMS; 1; 14	LMS; 2; 22	EST; 1; 3	EST; 2; 12	CAT; 1; 3	CAT; 2; 3	12th	55
2011	Carlin Motorsport	**ALC**; **1**; 2	ALC; 2; 5	**SPA**; **1**; 1	SPA; 2; 2	MNZ; 1 Ret	MNZ; 2 Ret	MON; 1; 2	**NÜR**; **1**; 1	**NÜR**; **2**; 2	HUN; 1; 5	HUN; 2; 7	**SIL**; **1**; 1	**SIL**; **2**; 1	LEC; 1; 2	LEC; 2; 19	**CAT**; **1**; 1	CAT; 2 Ret	**1st**	**241**

=== Complete A1 Grand Prix results ===
(key) (Races in bold indicate pole position) (Races in italics indicate fastest lap)

Year	Entrant	1	2	3	4	5	6	7	8	9	10	11	12	13	14	15	16	17	18	19	20	DC	Points
2007–08	Canada	NED; SPR	NED; FEA	CZE; SPR	CZE; FEA	MYS; SPR; 3	MYS; FEA; Ret	CHN; SPR; 15	CHN; FEA; Ret	NZL; SPR; Ret	NZL; FEA; 2	AUS; SPR; 3	AUS; FEA; 6	**RSA**; **SPR**; 1	RSA; FEA; 12	MEX; SPR; 7	**MEX**; **FEA**; 5	CHN; SPR; 2	CHN; FEA; 20	GBR; SPR	GBR; FEA	9th	75

=== Complete Formula 3 Euro Series results ===
(key)

Year	Entrant	Chassis	Engine	1	2	3	4	5	6	7	8	9	10	11	12	13	14	15	16	17	18	19	20	DC	Points
2008	Signature-Plus	Dallara F308/011	Volkswagen	HOC; 1	HOC; 2	MUG; 1	MUG; 2	PAU; 1; 9	PAU; 2; 8	NOR; 1; 7	NOR; 2; 2	ZAN; 1; 8	ZAN; 2 Ret	NÜR; 1; 12	NÜR; 2; 16	BRH; 1	BRH; 2	CAT; 1 Ret	CAT; 2; 14	LMS; 1; 7	LMS; 2; 1	HOC; 1; 23	HOC; 2; 8	15th	10.5
2009	Kolles & Heinz Union	Dallara F309/001	Volkswagen	HOC; 1; 11	HOC; 2; 11	LAU; 1	LAU; 2	NOR; 1	NOR; 2	ZAN; 1	ZAN; 2	OSC; 1	OSC; 2	NÜR; 1	NÜR; 2	BRH; 1	BRH; 2	CAT; 1	CAT; 2	DIJ; 1; 14	DIJ; 2; 7	HOC; 1	HOC; 2	22nd	0

=== Complete FIA Formula Two Championship results ===
(key) (Races in bold indicate pole position) (Races in italics indicate fastest lap)

Year	Entrant	1	2	3	4	5	6	7	8	9	10	11	12	13	14	15	16	DC	Points
2009	Motorsport Vision	**VAL**; **1**; 1	**VAL**; **2**; 1	BRN; 1; 9	BRN; 2 Ret	SPA; 1 Ret	SPA; 2; 3	BRH; 1; 4	BRH; 2; 2	DON; 1 Ret	DON; 2 Ret	OSC; 1; 8	OSC; 2; 4	IMO; 1; 4	**IMO**; **2**; 2	**CAT**; **1** Ret	**CAT**; **2**; 3	**2nd**	**64**

=== Complete GP3 Series results ===
(key) (Races in bold indicate pole position) (Races in italics indicate fastest lap)

Year	Entrant	1	2	3	4	5	6	7	8	9	10	11	12	13	14	15	16	DC	Points
2010	Status Grand Prix	CAT; FEA; 2	CAT; SPR; 4	IST; FEA; 11	IST; SPR; 21	VAL; FEA; 2	VAL; SPR; 16	SIL; FEA; 9	SIL; SPR; 5	HOC; FEA; 1	HOC; SPR; 5	HUN; FEA; 4	HUN; SPR; 2	**SPA**; **FEA**; 1	SPA; SPR; 11	MNZ; FEA; 2	MNZ; SPR; 1	**2nd**	**71**

=== Complete Formula One participations ===
(key) (Races in bold indicate pole position) (Races in italics indicate fastest lap)

Year	Entrant	Chassis	Engine	1	2	3	4	5	6	7	8	9	10	11	12	13	14	15	16	17	18	19	WDC	Points
2011	Marussia Virgin Racing	Virgin MVR-02	Cosworth CA2011 2.4 V8	AUS	MAL	CHN	TUR	ESP	MON	CAN	EUR	GBR	GER	HUN	BEL	ITA	SIN	JPN	KOR	IND	ABU; TD	BRA	–	–

=== Complete Deutsche Tourenwagen Masters results ===
(key) (Races in bold indicate pole position) (Races in italics indicate fastest lap)

Year	Team	Car	1	2	3	4	5	6	7	8	9	10	11	12	13	14	15	16	17	18	Pos	Points
2012	Mücke Motorsport	DTM AMG Mercedes C-Coupé	HOC; 14	LAU; 22†	BRH; 14	SPL; 13	NOR; 9	NÜR; 7	ZAN; Ret	OSC; 7	VAL; Ret	HOC; Ret									16th	14
2013	HWA Team	DTM AMG Mercedes C-Coupé	HOC; Ret	BRH; 3	SPL; 12	LAU; 4	**NOR**; 2	MSC; 12	NÜR; 1	OSC; 22†	ZAN; 16	HOC; 18									5th	70
2014	HWA Team	DTM AMG Mercedes C-Coupé	HOC; 18	OSC; Ret	HUN; 11	**NOR**; 1	MSC; 14	**SPL**; DSQ	NÜR; 9	LAU; 5	ZAN; 8	HOC; 17									12th	41
2015	HWA AG	DTM AMG Mercedes C-Coupé	HOC; 1 Ret	HOC; 2; 7	LAU; 1; 6	LAU; 2; 18	NOR; 1; 2	NOR; 2; 1	ZAN; 1 Ret	ZAN; 2; 19	SPL; 1 Ret	SPL; 2; 20†	MSC; 1; 12	MSC; 2; 22	OSC; 1 Ret	OSC; 2; 16	NÜR; 1; 8	NÜR; 2 Ret	HOC; 1 Ret	HOC; 2; 18	13th	61
2016	Mercedes-Benz DTM Team HWA I	Mercedes-AMG C63 DTM	HOC; 1; 2	HOC; 2; 5	SPL; 1; 11	SPL; 2; 20	LAU; 1; 3	LAU; 2; 3	NOR; 1 Ret	NOR; 2; 11	**ZAN**; **1**; 1	ZAN; 2; 16	MSC; 1; 1	MSC; 2; 5	NÜR; 1; 9	NÜR; 2; 13	HUN; 1; 10	HUN; 2; 10	HOC; 1; 23†	HOC; 2; 9	4th	124
2017	Mercedes-AMG Motorsport Mercedes Me	Mercedes-AMG C63 DTM	HOC; 1; 15	HOC; 2 Ret	LAU; 1; 2	**LAU**; **2**; 3	HUN; 1 Ret	HUN; 2; 8	NOR; 1 Ret	NOR; 2; 11	MSC; 1; 4	MSC; 2; 9	ZAN; 1; 11	ZAN; 2; 15†	NÜR; 1; 3	NÜR; 2; 1	SPL; 1; 4	SPL; 2; 10	HOC; 1; 7	HOC; 2; 17	9th	119

^{†} Driver retired, but was classified as they completed 75% of the winner's race distance.

=== Complete IMSA SportsCar Championship results ===
(key) (Races in bold indicate pole position; races in italics indicate fastest lap)

Year	Entrant	Class	Make	Engine	1	2	3	4	5	6	7	8	9	10	Rank	Points
2017	Starworks Motorsport	PC	Oreca FLM09	Chevrolet LS3 6.2 L V8	DAY; 5	SEB	COA	DET	WGL	MOS	ELK	PET			23rd	26
2025	DXDT Racing	GTD	Chevrolet Corvette Z06 GT3.R	Chevrolet LT6.R 5.5 L V8	DAY	SEB	LBH; 15	LGA; 10	WGL	MOS; 4	ELK; 8	VIR; 10	IMS	PET	23rd	1226
2026	DXDT Racing	GTD	Chevrolet Corvette Z06 GT3.R	Chevrolet LT6.R 5.5 L V8	DAY	SEB	**LBH**; 6	LGA; WD	WGL	MOS; 13	ELK; 14	VIR; 8	IMS	PET; 12	33rd	1133

Sporting positions
Preceded by Richard Philippe	Formula BMW USA; Champion; 2006	Succeeded by Daniel Morad
Preceded by Mikhail Aleshin	Formula Renault 3.5 Series; Champion; 2011	Succeeded by Robin Frijns
Preceded by Taylor Hagler; Michael Lewis	Michelin Pilot Challenge; TCR Champion; 2023; With: Harry Gottsacker	Succeeded by Incumbent
Awards
Preceded by Fernando Alonso	Indianapolis 500; Rookie of the Year; 2018	Succeeded by Santino Ferrucci
