= Jimmy Auby =

South African racing driver

- Nationality: (South Africa) South African
- Born: 7 November 1986 (age 40) Johannesburg (South Africa)

WesBank V8 Supercars
- Years active: 2007, 2010-2011

Previous series
- 2007–08 2008 2008 2007 2007 2007 2005–07: A1 Grand Prix; Spanish F3; Italian F3; Euroseries 3000; Eurocup Formula Renault 2.0; Formula 3000 Italy; South African V8 Championship

Championship titles
- 2011: WesBank V8 Supercars

Jimmy Auby (born 7 November 1986 in Johannesburg, South Africa) is a South African racing driver. He raced in the South African V8 Championship after progressing from karting. He moved into European competition and featured in the 2007 Euroseries 3000 season and 2008 Spanish Formula Three season.

Auby was the A1 Team Lebanon driver for two rounds of the 2007–08 A1 Grand Prix season and was the backup driver for most of the 2008–09 season.

Auby gained test driver experience during the 2008 Superleague Formula season. He has also competed in the Spanish Formula 3 and Formula Volkswagen South Africa series, and returned to the WesBank V8 Supercar series in 2010, becoming the series' final champion in 2011.

Sporting positions
Preceded by Brandon Auby	WesBank V8 Supercar Champion; 2011	Succeeded by Final
