= Satrio Hermanto =

Indonesian racing driver

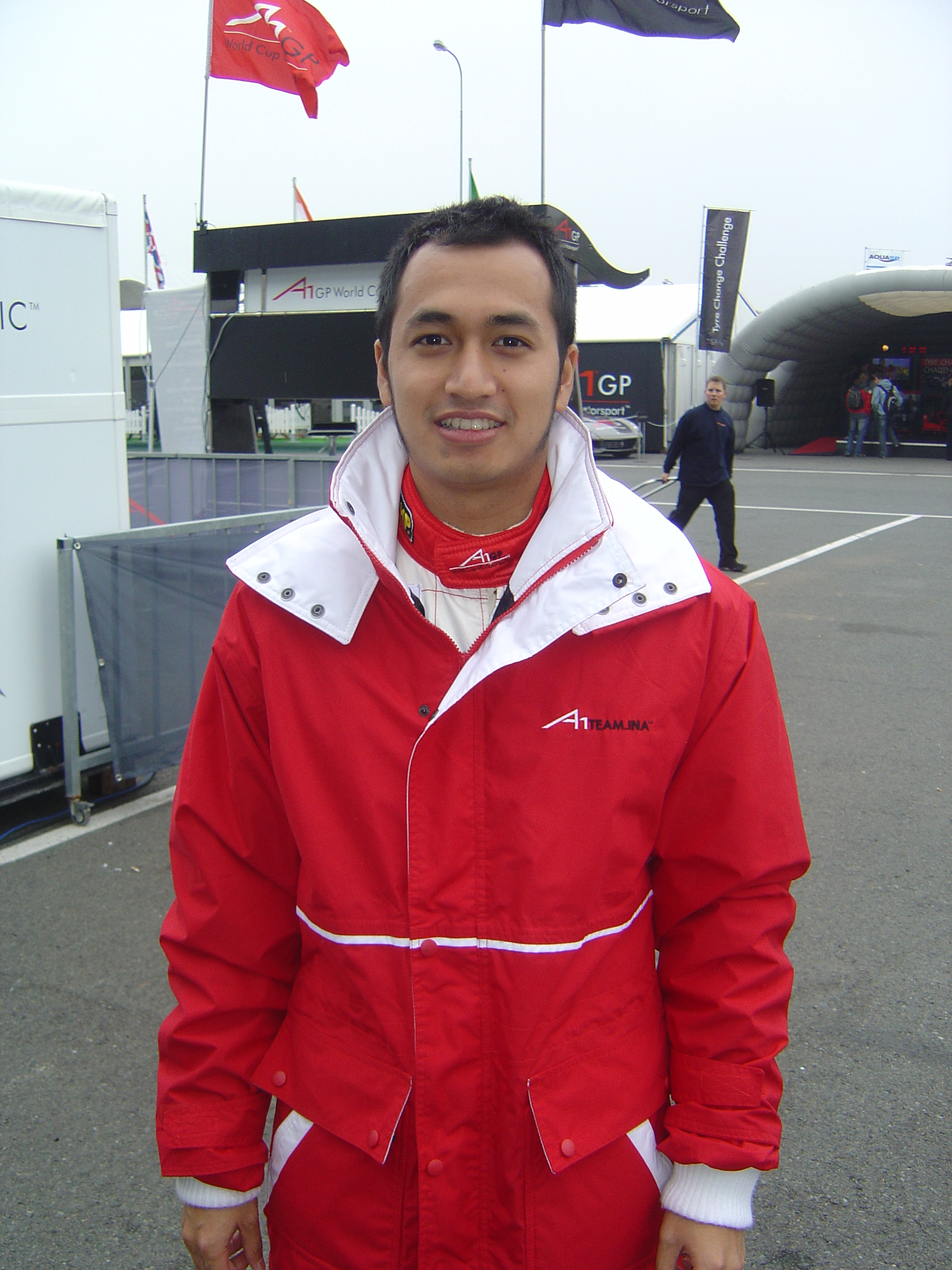
- Hermanto in 2007.
- Nationality: (Indonesia) Indonesian
- Full name: Adil Satryaguna Hermanto
- Born: 29 June 1984 (age 42) Jakarta (Indonesia)

British F3 National Class career
- Debut season: 2009
- Current team: Litespeed F3
- Car number: 53
- Starts: 3
- Wins: 0
- Poles: 0
- Fastest laps: 0
- Best finish: 8th in 2009

Previous series
- 2008 2007–08, 2008–09 2007 2006 1999 1998: ATS Formel 3 Cup; A1 Grand Prix; Formula V6 Asia; Asian F3; Formula Asia; Timor One Make Series

Championship titles
- 2006 1998: Asian F3 Promotion Class; Timor One Make Series

Adil Satryaguna "Satrio" Hermanto (born 29 June 1984 in Jakarta) is an Indonesian racing driver.

== Career ==
=== Karting ===
Hermanto started racing in the Indonesian karting National Championship in 1994.

- 1995: National Champion Category intercontinental A
- 1996: 3rd Place in National Champion Category Intercontinental A
- 1997: National Champion Category intercontinental A
- 2005: 9th Place in Grand Finale World Rotax Max

=== Touring Car ===
In 1998, Hermanto became national champion in Timor One Make Race Division II.

=== Formulas ===
In 1999, Hermanto took the second place in the National Formula Asia, and third place in the 2000 Formula Ford Euro Asia Cup in Sentul.

Hermanto tested cars in Formula BMW (Team Meritus) at Sepang in 2005, and in Formula Renault (ART Grand Prix and Champ Motorsport) at Zhuhai in 2006.

Hermanto won the Formula 3 Asia Promotion Class in 2006 with the Joson Formula 3 team.

In 2007-08, Hermanto was the race driver for A1 Team Indonesia.

Hermanto competed in two rounds of the 2009 British Formula Three season for Litespeed F3.

== Career series results ==
Season	Series	Team	Races	Wins	Poles	FLaps	Points	Pos.
2009	British F3 National Class	Litespeed F3	3	0	0	0	16	8th
2008–09	A1 Grand Prix	A1 Team Indonesia	10	0	0	0	3	21st (1)
2008	ATS Formel 3 Cup	Performance Racing	2	0	0	0	0	19th
2007–08	A1 Grand Prix	A1 Team Indonesia	20	0	0	0	1	21st (1)
2007	Formula V6 Asia	Team Meritus	10	0	0	0	67	3rd
2006	Formula 3 Asia	Joson Formula 3	17	?	?	?	58	7th
2006	Formula 3 Asia Promotion Class	Joson Formula 3	17	11	?	15	291	1st
1999	Formula Asia		?	?	?	?	?	2nd
1998	Timor One Make Series - Division II		?	?	?	?	?	1st

  - Season still in progress. (1) = Team standings.
