= 2007–08 A1 Grand Prix season =

A1 Grand Prix season

2007–08 A1 Grand Prix of Nations

Champions
- Champions: Switzerland

Seasons
- ← 2006–07 2008–09 →

The 2007–08 A1 Grand Prix season was the third season of A1 Grand Prix.

== Calendar ==
The Indonesian round at Sentul was removed from the calendar. Following the farcical Beijing round the previous season, the second Chinese event was moved to Zhuhai International Circuit near Hong Kong. Two pre-season tests were held at Silverstone Circuit on 28–29 August 2007 and 18–19 September 2007.

Due to Zandvoort's noise restrictions, regular and rookie practice sessions were not held on Friday at the Dutch round. Saturday morning was dedicated to practice sessions and Saturday afternoon to qualifying.

Round	Event	Circuit	Dates
1	A1 Grand Prix of Nations, Netherlands	Circuit Park Zandvoort	28–30 September 2007
2	A1 Grand Prix of Nations, Czech Republic	Automotodrom Brno	12–14 October 2007
3	A1 Grand Prix of Nations, Malaysia	Sepang International Circuit	23–25 November 2007
4	A1 Grand Prix of Nations, China (Zhuhai)	Zhuhai International Circuit	14–16 December 2007
5	A1 Grand Prix of Nations, New Zealand	Taupo Motorsport Park	18–20 January 2008
6	A1 Grand Prix of Nations, Australia	Eastern Creek Raceway	1–3 February 2008
7	A1 Grand Prix of Nations, South Africa	Durban Street Circuit	22–24 February 2008
8	A1 Grand Prix of Nations, Mexico	Autódromo Hermanos Rodríguez	14–16 March 2008
9	A1 Grand Prix of Nations, China (Shanghai)	Shanghai International Circuit	11–13 April 2008
10	(United Kingdom) A1 Grand Prix of Nations, Great Britain	Brands Hatch	2–4 May 2008
Map
2007–08 A1 Grand Prix season is located in Earth

== Entry list ==
All teams used same A1 Grand Prix car including Zytek-powered, Cooper Avon-shod and Lola A1GP chassis. No new teams entered the championships, whilst both Greece and Singapore did not return having failed to complete their debut seasons.

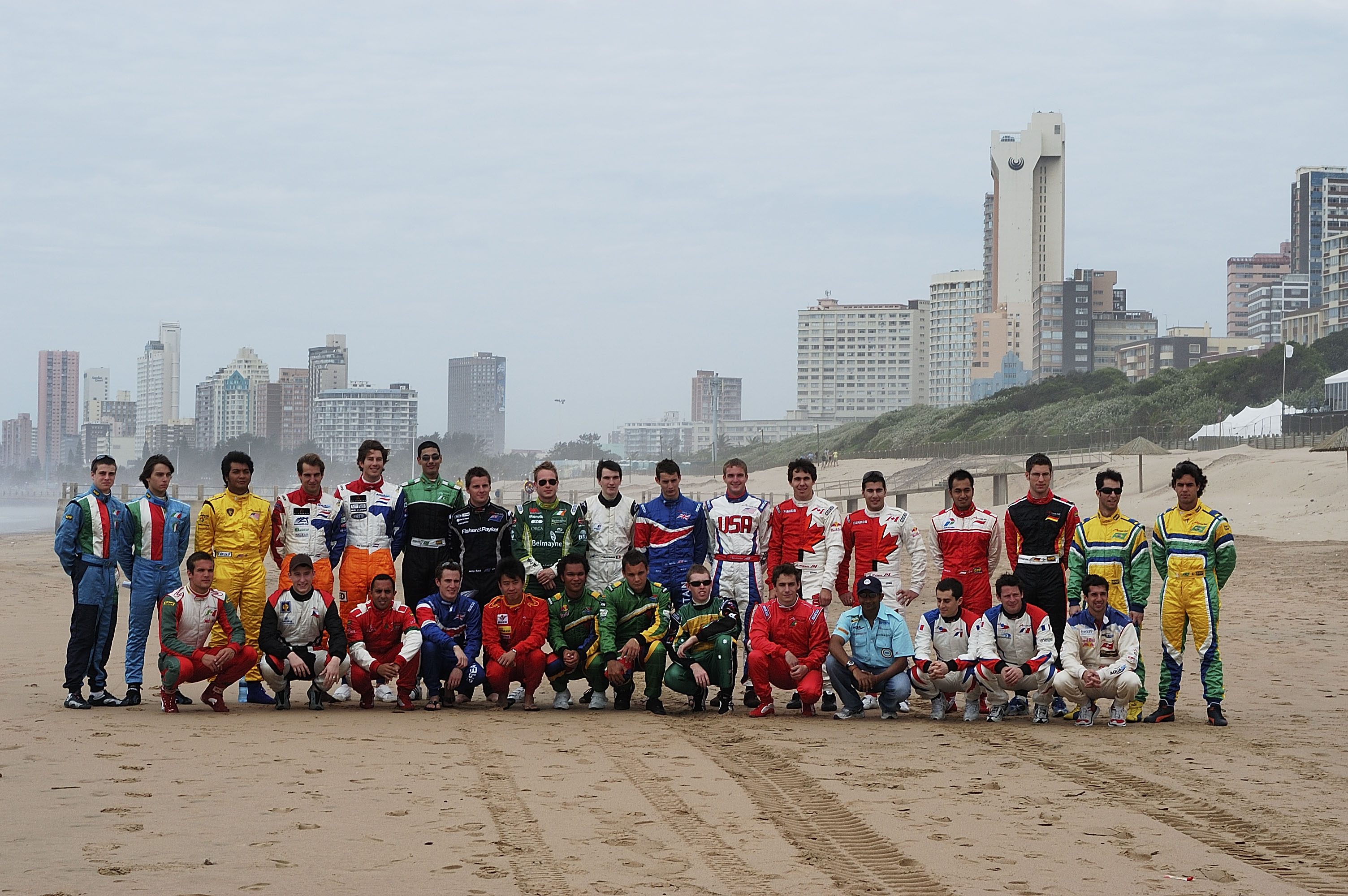
Drivers in attendance at the Durban round.

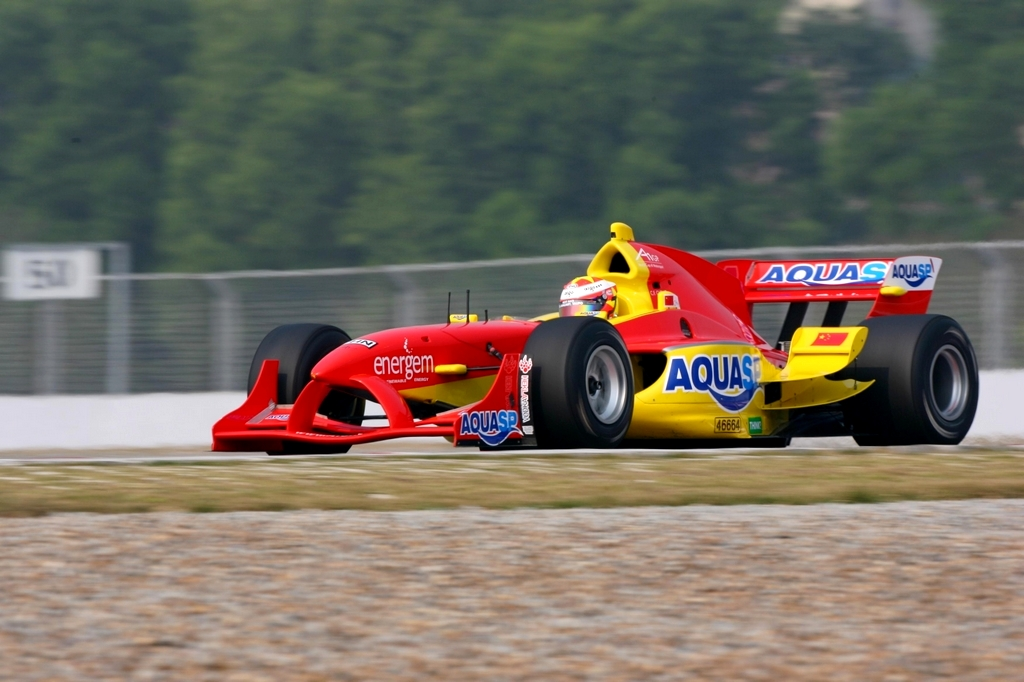
Congfu Cheng completed the season for Team China.

Entrant (Team)	Driver	Events
(Australia) A1 Team Australia; Alan Docking Racing	Ian Dyk	1–4
(Australia) A1 Team Australia; Alan Docking Racing	John Martin	5–10
(Brazil) A1 Team Brazil; Argo Racing Cars	Sérgio Jimenez	1–6
(Brazil) A1 Team Brazil; Argo Racing Cars	Bruno Junqueira	7–8
(Brazil) A1 Team Brazil; Argo Racing Cars	Alexandre Negrão	9–10
(Canada) A1 Team Canada; Status Grand Prix	James Hinchcliffe	1–2, 10
(Canada) A1 Team Canada; Status Grand Prix	Robert Wickens	3–9
(China) A1 Team China; Team Astromega	Congfu Cheng	All
A1 Team Czech Republic; Charouz Racing System	Erik Janiš	1–3
A1 Team Czech Republic; Charouz Racing System	Tomáš Enge	4–6
A1 Team Czech Republic; Charouz Racing System	Josef Král	7
A1 Team Czech Republic; Charouz Racing System	Filip Salaquarda	8–10
(France) A1 Team France; DAMS	Loïc Duval	1, 3–7
(France) A1 Team France; DAMS	Nicolas Lapierre	2
(France) A1 Team France; DAMS	Jonathan Cochet	8
(France) A1 Team France; DAMS	Franck Montagny	9–10
(Germany) A1 Team Germany; David Sears Motorsport	Christian Vietoris	1–2, 5
(Germany) A1 Team Germany; David Sears Motorsport	Michael Ammermüller	3–4, 6–10
(United Kingdom) A1 Team Great Britain	Oliver Jarvis	1, 3–4, 7–8
(United Kingdom) A1 Team Great Britain	Robbie Kerr	2, 5–6, 9–10
(India) A1 Team India; Arena Motorsport	Narain Karthikeyan	1–6, 8–10
(India) A1 Team India; Arena Motorsport	Parthiva Sureshwaren	7
A1 Team Indonesia; A1 Team Indonesia (1–4); Performance Racing (5–10)	Satrio Hermanto	All
(Republic of Ireland) A1 Team Ireland; Status Grand Prix	Ralph Firman, Jr.	1
(Republic of Ireland) A1 Team Ireland; Status Grand Prix	Adam Carroll	2–10
(Italy) A1 Team Italy; Team Ghinzani	Enrico Toccacelo	1–3
(Italy) A1 Team Italy; Team Ghinzani	Edoardo Piscopo	4–10
(Lebanon) A1 Team Lebanon; Argo Racing Cars	(Australia) Chris Alajajian	1, 3–6
(Lebanon) A1 Team Lebanon; Argo Racing Cars	(South Africa) Jimmy Auby	2, 7, 10
(Lebanon) A1 Team Lebanon; Argo Racing Cars	Khalil Beschir	8–9
A1 Team Malaysia	Alex Yoong	1–5, 8–9
A1 Team Malaysia	Fairuz Fauzy	6–7, 10
(Mexico) A1 Team Mexico; Teamcraft Motorsport	Salvador Durán	1
(Mexico) A1 Team Mexico; Teamcraft Motorsport	Michel Jourdain, Jr.	2–3
(Mexico) A1 Team Mexico; Teamcraft Motorsport	David Garza	4–8
(Mexico) A1 Team Mexico; Teamcraft Motorsport	Jorge Goeters	9
(Mexico) A1 Team Mexico; Teamcraft Motorsport	David Martínez	10
(Netherlands) A1 Team Netherlands; Racing for Holland	Jeroen Bleekemolen	All
(New Zealand) A1 Team New Zealand; David Sears Motorsport	Jonny Reid	All
(Pakistan) A1 Team Pakistan; Performance Racing	Adam Khan	All
A1 Team Portugal	João Urbano	1–6
A1 Team Portugal	Filipe Albuquerque	7–10
(South Africa) A1 Team South Africa; DAMS	Adrian Zaugg	All
(Switzerland) A1 Team Switzerland; Max Motorsport	Neel Jani	All
(United States) A1 Team USA	Buddy Rice	1–2
(United States) A1 Team USA	Jonathan Summerton	3–10

== Rule changes ==
=== Sporting ===
- The existing qualifying format was retained, however the first two qualifying sessions determined the grid for the sprint race whilst the second two qualifying sessions determined the grid for the feature race.
- The number of mandatory pit stops in the feature race increased from one to two.
- The time certain limit of the sprint race was increased to 29 minutes + 1 lap.
- From the Taupo round, the pit exit closed under Safety Car conditions.

=== Technical ===
- From the Taupo round, the fuel mixture was changed to a 30% biofuel mix produced by Petrochem Carless.

== Results and standings ==
=== Results summary ===
Round		Event	Pole position	Fastest lap	Winner	Report
1	S	Netherlands	(South Africa) Adrian Zaugg	(South Africa) Adrian Zaugg	(South Africa) Adrian Zaugg	Report
1	F	Netherlands	(South Africa) Adrian Zaugg	(Mexico) Salvador Durán	(United Kingdom) Oliver Jarvis	Report
2	S	Czech Republic	(South Africa) Adrian Zaugg	(New Zealand) Jonny Reid	(New Zealand) Jonny Reid	Report
2	F	Czech Republic	(Netherlands) Jeroen Bleekemolen	(China) Congfu Cheng	(New Zealand) Jonny Reid	Report
3	S	Malaysia	(Switzerland) Neel Jani	(Switzerland) Neel Jani	(Switzerland) Neel Jani	Report
3	F	Malaysia	(Switzerland) Neel Jani	(Switzerland) Neel Jani	(Switzerland) Neel Jani	Report
4	S	China (Zhuhai)	(Germany) Michael Ammermüller	(Switzerland) Neel Jani	(Germany) Michael Ammermüller	Report
4	F	China (Zhuhai)	(Switzerland) Neel Jani	(United Kingdom) Oliver Jarvis	(India) Narain Karthikeyan	Report
5	S	New Zealand	(New Zealand) Jonny Reid	(Germany) Christian Vietoris	(New Zealand) Jonny Reid	Report
5	F	New Zealand	(France) Loïc Duval	(Switzerland) Neel Jani	(Germany) Christian Vietoris	Report
6	S	Australia	(France) Loïc Duval	(France) Loïc Duval	(France) Loïc Duval	Report
6	F	Australia	(New Zealand) Jonny Reid	(South Africa) Adrian Zaugg	(South Africa) Adrian Zaugg	Report
7	S	South Africa	(Canada) Robert Wickens	(New Zealand) Jonny Reid	(Canada) Robert Wickens	Report
7	F	South Africa	(Switzerland) Neel Jani	(China) Congfu Cheng	(Switzerland) Neel Jani	Report
8	S	Mexico	(South Africa) Adrian Zaugg	(China) Congfu Cheng	(New Zealand) Jonny Reid	Report
8	F	Mexico	(Canada) Robert Wickens	(United Kingdom) Oliver Jarvis	(Republic of Ireland) Adam Carroll	Report
9	S	China (Shanghai)	(Switzerland) Neel Jani	(Switzerland) Neel Jani	(Switzerland) Neel Jani	Report
9	F	China (Shanghai)	(Switzerland) Neel Jani	(Canada) Robert Wickens	(United States) Jonathan Summerton	Report
10	S	(United Kingdom) Great Britain	(United Kingdom) Robbie Kerr	(China) Congfu Cheng	(United Kingdom) Robbie Kerr	Report
10	F	(United Kingdom) Great Britain	(India) Narain Karthikeyan	(Republic of Ireland) Adam Carroll	(India) Narain Karthikeyan	Report

=== Championship standings ===
Points system

Points are now assigned in the same manner for both the sprint and feature races using the following format with one bonus point awarded for the fastest lap in each race.

Position	1st	2nd	3rd	4th	5th	6th	7th	8th	9th	10th	FL	Ref
Points	15	12	10	8	6	5	4	3	2	1	1	

Championship standings

Pos	Team	Drivers	(Netherlands) NED		(Czech Republic) CZE		(Malaysia) MLY		(China) ZHU		(New Zealand) NZL		(Australia) AUS		(South Africa) RSA		(Mexico) MEX		(China) SHA		(United Kingdom) GBR		Pts
Pos	Team	Drivers	S	F	S	F	S	F	S	F	S	F	S	F	S	F	S	F	S	F	S	F	Pts
1	Switzerland	Neel Jani	5	3	8	3	**1**	**1**	2	**6**	Ret	13	10	2	3	**1**	3	19	**1**	**5**	4	3	168
2	New Zealand	Jonny Reid	9	7	1	1	5	8	10	2	**1**	4	2	**9**	20	10	1	12	Ret	4	8	8	127
3	(United Kingdom) Great Britain	Oliver Jarvis	7	1			6	12	6	5					2	11	2	2					126
3	(United Kingdom) Great Britain	Robbie Kerr			2	17					Ret	Ret	16	3					9	9	**1**	2	126
4	France	Loïc Duval	2	5			2	2	8	7	3	**3**	**1**	Ret	11	2							118
4	France	Nicolas Lapierre			6	5																	118
4	France	Jonathan Cochet															12	13					118
4	France	Franck Montagny																	12	8	10	5	118
5	South Africa	Adrian Zaugg	**1**	**2**	**4**	16	10	Ret	Ret	3	4	7	7	1	13	7	**Ret**	6	7	16	7	11	96
6	(Republic of Ireland) Ireland	Ralph Firman, Jr.	8	6																			94
6	(Republic of Ireland) Ireland	Adam Carroll			3	6	7	7	4	16	6	5	15	13	15	Ret	4	1	11	3	3	13	94
7	Netherlands	Jeroen Bleekemolen	3	8	5	**2**	18	4	9	Ret	5	8	9	8	5	4	8	4	17	18	9	6	87
8	Germany	Christian Vietoris	6	9	7	8					2	1											83
8	Germany	Michael Ammermüller					16	EX	**1**	4			4	7	EX	Ret	Ret	20	6	10	20	Ret	83
9	Canada	James Hinchcliffe	19	18	12	11															15	17	75
9	Canada	Robert Wickens					3	Ret	15	Ret	Ret	2	3	6	**1**	12	7	**5**	2	20			75
10	India	Narain Karthikeyan	10	Ret	21	9	11	6	7	1	10	Ret	11	11			13	9	5	7	5	**1**	61
10	India	Parthiva Sureshwaren													17	Ret							61
11	Portugal	João Urbano	11	Ret	9	18	13	Ret	19	12	8	12	12	16									59
11	Portugal	Filipe Albuquerque													7	3	6	7	3	2	6	7	59
12	United States	Buddy Rice	22	13	16	15																	56
12	United States	Jonathan Summerton					12	10	12	10	7	14	5	Ret	10	Ret	5	3	21	1	2	12	56
13	China	Congfu Cheng	17	15	10	4	Ret	5	3	9	14	Ret	14	10	4	6	17	10	10	15	21	4	55
14	Brazil	Sérgio Jimenez	13	11	11	7	4	3	18	Ret	13	6	8	4									44
14	Brazil	Bruno Junqueira													Ret	9	10	8					44
14	Brazil	Alexandre Negrão																	14	13	16	14	44
15	Malaysia	Alex Yoong	16	Ret	17	14	9	13	Ret	Ret	Ret	Ret					9	15	4	6			25
15	Malaysia	Fairuz Fauzy											20	17	9	5					13	Ret	25
16	Mexico	Salvador Durán	4	4																			22
16	Mexico	Michel Jourdain, Jr.			13	22	20	11															22
16	Mexico	David Garza							16	11	17	9	17	18	8	Ret	16	14					22
16	Mexico	Jorge Goeters																	20	21			22
16	Mexico	David Martínez																			20	16	22
17	Australia	Ian Dyk	21	12	Ret	13	Ret	9	13	15													20
17	Australia	John Martin									9	Ret	6	5	6	14	Ret	21	15	14	14	Ret	20
18	Italy	Enrico Toccacelo	12	14	14	10	8	Ret															12
18	Italy	Edoardo Piscopo							11	Ret	12	Ret	13	14	14	8	11	Ret	8	12	17	9	12
19	Czech Republic	Erik Janiš	15	10	18	12	15	15															10
19	Czech Republic	Tomáš Enge							5	8	Ret	11	18	15									10
19	Czech Republic	Josef Král													18	Ret							10
19	Czech Republic	Filip Salaquarda															Ret	16	13	11	12	15	10
20	Pakistan	Adam Khan	18	17	15	20	17	14	14	14	11	10	Ret	12	12	Ret	Ret	18	16	17	18	Ret	1
21	Indonesia	Satrio Hermanto	20	16	19	19	19	16	17	Ret	16	Ret	21	20	16	Ret	14	11	19	19	19	10	1
22	Lebanon	(Australia) Chris Alajajian	14	19			14	Ret	Ret	13	15	Ret	19	19									0
22	Lebanon	(South Africa) Jimmy Auby			20	21									19	13					22	18	0
22	Lebanon	Khalil Beschir															15	17	18	22			0
Pos	Team	Drivers	S	F	S	F	S	F	S	F	S	F	S	F	S	F	S	F	S	F	S	F	Pts
Pos	Team	Drivers	(Netherlands) NED		(Czech Republic) CZE		(Malaysia) MLY		(China) ZHU		(New Zealand) NZL		(Australia) AUS		(South Africa) RSA		(Mexico) MEX		(China) SHA		(United Kingdom) GBR		Pts

Colour	Result
Gold	Winner
Silver	2nd place
Bronze	3rd place
Green	Finished, in points
Green	Retired, in points
Blue	Finished, no points
Purple	Did not finish (Ret)
Purple	Not classified (NC)
Red	Did not qualify (DNQ)
Black	Disqualified (DSQ)
White	Did not start (DNS)
White	Withdrew (WD)
Blank	Did not participate
Blank	Injured (INJ)
Blank	Excluded (EX)
**Bold**	Pole position
*	Fastest lap
spr	Sprint Race
fea	Feature Race
