= A1 Team Indonesia =

- Indonesia
- Founded: 2005
- Seat holder(s): n/a
- Team principal: Bagoes Hermanto
- Race driver(s): Satrio Hermanto, Zahir Ali
- First race: 2005-06 Great Britain
- Rounds entered: 38 (76 races)
- Championships: 0
- Sprint race victories: 0
- Feature race victories: 0
- Pole positions: 0
- Fastest laps: 0
- Total points: 21
- 2008-09 position: 15th (0 pts)

A1 Team Indonesia was the Indonesian team of A1 Grand Prix, an international racing series.

== Management ==
A1 Team Indonesia participated in all four seasons of A1 Grand Prix, from 2006 to 2009. When the team started, John Allen served as the manager. In 2007, Bagoes Hermanto became the team principal. Hermanto hired Performance Racing to providetechnical and race services with Bobby Issazadhe as team manager and Dave Luff as race engineer.

== History ==
=== 2008–09 season ===
Driver: Satrio Hermanto, Zahir Ali

Team Indonesia scored three points, finishing 20th in the final standings. Their best finish was 9th place at the second race in Kyalami.

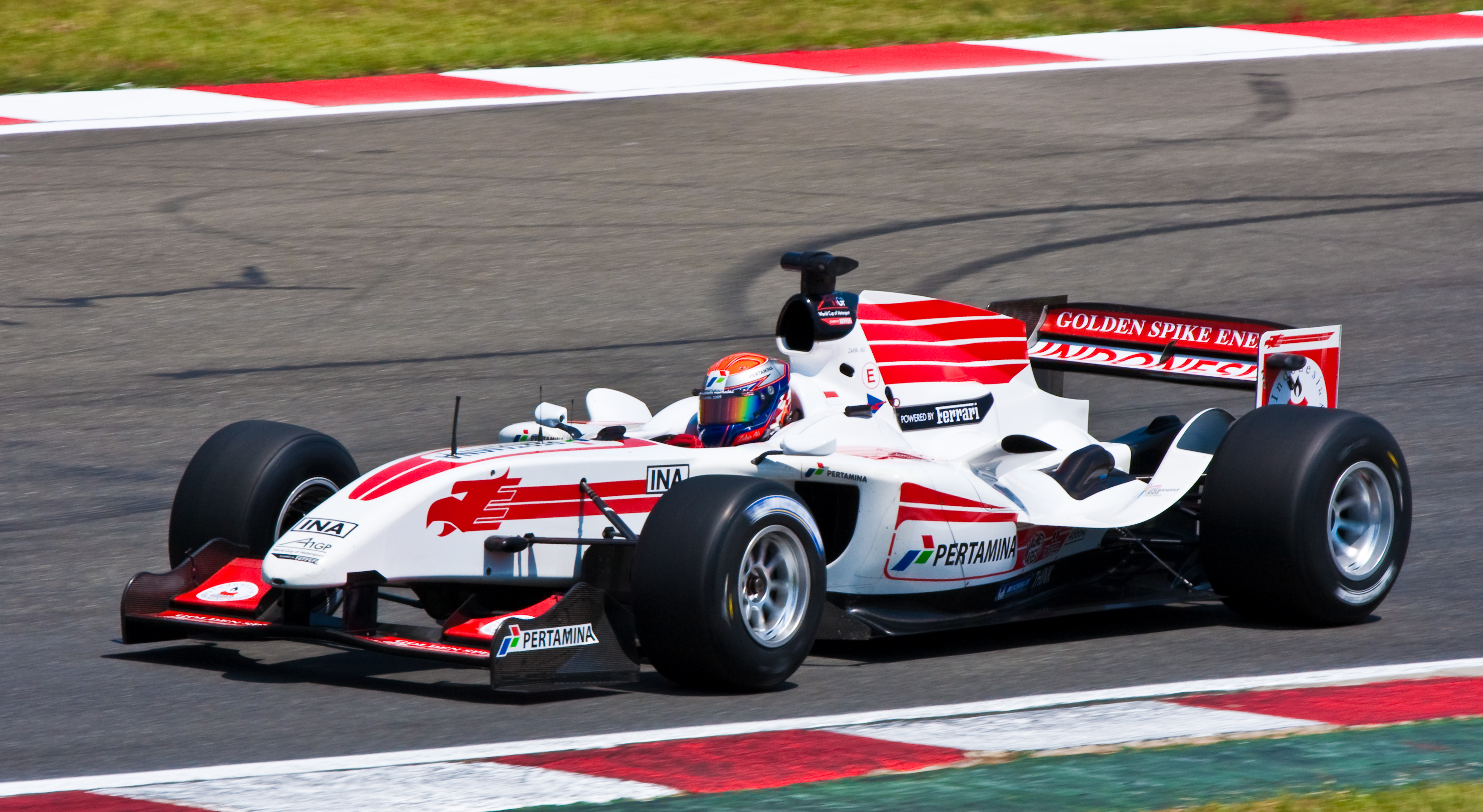
A1 Team Indonesia in Kyalami Circuit 2009

=== 2007–08 season ===
Driver: Satrio Hermanto

Team Indonesia again only managed to score in a single race, this time not scoring until the final race of the season. They finished in 21st position with a single point.

=== 2006–07 season ===
Drivers: Ananda Mikola, Moreno Soeprapto

Team Indonesia only managed to score in a single race, finishing in 21st position with a single point.

=== 2005–06 season ===
Driver: Ananda Mikola

In the inaugural season, Team Indonesia scored points on four occasions, finishing in 18th position with 16 points.

== Drivers ==
Name	Seasons	Races (Starts)	A1GP Title	Wins	Sprint wins	Main wins	2nd	3rd	Poles	Fastest Laps	Points
Zahir Ali	2008-09	2 (4)									3
Satrio Hermanto	2007-08, 2008-09	16 (32)									1
Ananda Mikola	2005-06, 2006-07	20 (40)									17
Moreno Soeprapto	2006-07	1 (2)									0

== Complete A1 Grand Prix results ==
(key), "spr" indicate a Sprint Race, "fea" indicate a Main Race.

Year	Racing team	Chassis, Engine, Tyres	Drivers	1	2	3	4	5	6	7	8	9	10	11	12	13	14	15	16	17	18	19	20	21	22	Points	Rank
2005-06	A1 Team Indonesia	Lola, Zytek, Cooper Avon		GBR spr	GBR fea	GER spr	GER fea	PRT spr	PRT fea	AUS spr	AUS fea	MYS spr	MYS fea	ARE spr	ARE fea	ZAF spr	ZAF fea	IDN spr	IDN fea	MEX spr	MEX fea	USA spr	USA fea	CHN spr	CHN fea	16	18th
2005-06	A1 Team Indonesia	Lola, Zytek, Cooper Avon	Ananda Mikola	17	Ret	14	8	9	Ret			Ret	14	6	Ret	Ret	Ret	11	14	12	16	Ret	Ret	5	Ret	16	18th
2006-07	A1 Team Indonesia	Lola; Zytek; Cooper Avon		NED spr	NED fea	CZE spr	CZE fea	BEI spr	BEI fea	MYS spr	MYS fea	IDN spr	IDN fea	NZ spr	NZ fea	AUS spr	AUS fea	ZAF spr	ZAF fea	MEX spr	MEX fea	SHA spr	SHA fea	GBR spr	GBR fea	1	21st
2006-07	A1 Team Indonesia	Lola; Zytek; Cooper Avon	Ananda Mikola	19	10	16	15	15	Ret	Ret	15	14	11	15	Ret	17	13	10	Ret	8	11	13	16			1	21st
2006-07	A1 Team Indonesia	Lola; Zytek; Cooper Avon	Moreno Soeprapto																					17	16	1	21st
2007-08	A1 Team Indonesia (1-4); Performance Racing (5-10)	Lola; Zytek; Cooper Avon		NED spr	NED fea	CZE spr	CZE fea	MYS spr	MYS fea	ZHU spr	ZHU fea	NZ spr	NZ fea	AUS spr	AUS fea	ZAF spr	ZAF fea	MEX spr	MEX fea	SHA spr	SHA fea	GBR spr	GBR fea			1	21st
2007-08	A1 Team Indonesia (1-4); Performance Racing (5-10)	Lola; Zytek; Cooper Avon	Satrio Hermanto	20	16	19	19	19	16	17	Ret	16	Ret	21	20	16	Ret	14	11	19	19	19	10			1	21st
2008-09	Performance Racing	Ferrari, Ferrari, Michelin		NLD		CHN		MYS		NZL		RSA		POR		GBR										3	20th
2008-09	Performance Racing	Ferrari, Ferrari, Michelin		spr	fea	spr	fea	spr	fea	spr	fea	spr	fea	spr	fea	spr	fea									3	20th
2008-09	Performance Racing	Ferrari, Ferrari, Michelin	Satrio Hermanto	Ret	Ret	18	14	13	13	13	Ret					12	13									3	20th
2008-09	Performance Racing	Ferrari, Ferrari, Michelin	Zahir Ali									18	9	14	10											3	20th
