= A1 Team Czech Republic =

- Czech Republic
- Founded: 2005
- Seat holder(s): Antonin Charouz
- First race: 2005-06 Great Britain
- Rounds entered: 32
- Championships: 0
- Sprint race victories: 0
- Feature race victories: 1
- Pole positions: 0
- Fastest laps: 0
- Total points: 93

A1 Team Czech Republic was the Czech team of A1 Grand Prix, an international racing series. Although no official announcement was made, the team's flag icon was removed from the A1GP website, and they do not appear in the 2008–09 season results page.

== Management ==
The A1 Team Czech Republic seat holder was Antonin Charouz.

== History ==
=== 2007–08 season ===
Drivers: Tomáš Enge, Erik Janiš, Josef Král, Filip Salaquarda

The team fared worse in 2007–08, scoring in just three events, and finishing 19th overall.

=== 2006–07 season ===
Drivers: Jan Charouz, Tomáš Enge, Jaroslav Janiš, Tomáš Kostka, Filip Salaquarda

Although the team scored on less occasions, the team still finished in 12th position, including a podium in their home race.

=== 2005–06 season ===
Drivers: Jan Charouz, Tomáš Enge

Good, consistent results, including a victory and two podiums, brought the team to 12th position in the final standings.

== Drivers ==
Name	Seasons	Races (Starts)	A1GP Title	Wins	Sprint wins	Main wins	2nd	3rd	Poles	Fastest Laps	Points
Jan Charouz	2005-06, 2006-07	2 (4)									0
Tomáš Enge	2005-06, 2006-07, 2007-08	19 (38)		1		1	1	2			86
Erik Janiš	2007-08	3 (6)									1
Jaroslav Janiš	2006-07	2 (4)									4
Tomáš Kostka	2006-07	1 (2)									0
Josef Král	2007-08	1 (2)									0
Filip Salaquarda	2006-07, 2007-08	4 (8)									1

== Complete A1 Grand Prix results ==
(key), "spr" indicate a Sprint Race, "fea" indicate a Main Race.

Year	Racing team	Chassis, Engine, Tyres	Drivers	1	2	3	4	5	6	7	8	9	10	11	12	13	14	15	16	17	18	19	20	21	22	Points	Rank
2005-06	Charouz Racing System	Lola, Zytek, Cooper Avon		GBR spr	GBR fea	GER spr	GER fea	PRT spr	PRT fea	AUS spr	AUS fea	MYS spr	MYS fea	ARE spr	ARE fea	ZAF spr	ZAF fea	IDN spr	IDN fea	MEX spr	MEX fea	USA spr	USA fea	CHN spr	CHN fea	56	12th
2005-06	Charouz Racing System	Lola, Zytek, Cooper Avon	Jan Charouz	18	Ret																					56	12th
2005-06	Charouz Racing System	Lola, Zytek, Cooper Avon	Tomáš Enge			11	Ret	5	9	Ret	Ret	16	3	3	Ret	5	Ret	10	13	5	7	18	Ret	6	1	56	12th
2006-07	Charouz Racing System	Lola; Zytek; Cooper Avon		NED spr	NED fea	CZE spr	CZE fea	BEI spr	BEI fea	MYS spr	MYS fea	IDN spr	IDN fea	NZ spr	NZ fea	AUS spr	AUS fea	ZAF spr	ZAF fea	MEX spr	MEX fea	SHA spr	SHA fea	GBR spr	GBR fea	27	12th
2006-07	Charouz Racing System	Lola; Zytek; Cooper Avon	Tomáš Kostka	17	Ret																					27	12th
2006-07	Charouz Racing System	Lola; Zytek; Cooper Avon	Tomáš Enge			5	2	8	6	Ret	14			17	12	9	5	11	Ret							27	12th
2006-07	Charouz Racing System	Lola; Zytek; Cooper Avon	Jaroslav Janiš									16	7							12	12					27	12th
2006-07	Charouz Racing System	Lola; Zytek; Cooper Avon	Filip Salaquarda																			17	10			27	12th
2006-07	Charouz Racing System	Lola; Zytek; Cooper Avon	Jan Charouz																					13	15	27	12th
2007-08	Charouz Racing System	Lola; Zytek; Cooper Avon		NED spr	NED fea	CZE spr	CZE fea	MYS spr	MYS fea	ZHU spr	ZHU fea	NZ spr	NZ fea	AUS spr	AUS fea	ZAF spr	ZAF fea	MEX spr	MEX fea	SHA spr	SHA fea	GBR spr	GBR fea			10	19th
2007-08	Charouz Racing System	Lola; Zytek; Cooper Avon	Erik Janiš	15	10	18	12	15	15																	10	19th
2007-08	Charouz Racing System	Lola; Zytek; Cooper Avon	Tomáš Enge							5	8	Ret	11	18	15											10	19th
2007-08	Charouz Racing System	Lola; Zytek; Cooper Avon	Josef Král													18	Ret									10	19th
2007-08	Charouz Racing System	Lola; Zytek; Cooper Avon	Filip Salaquarda															Ret	16	13	11	12	15			10	19th
