= 2006 Sentul A1GP round (February) =

2005-06 A1GP of Indonesia

Race Details
- Race 8 of 11 in the 2005-06 A1 Grand Prix season
- Date: 12 February 2006
- Location: Sentul International Circuit; Bogor, Indonesia
- Weather: Fine

Qualifying
- Pole: Great Britain (Robbie Kerr)
- Time: 2'34.257 (1'16.927, 1'17.330)

Sprint Race
- 1st: France (Nicolas Lapierre)
- 2nd: Great Britain (Robbie Kerr)
- 3rd: Mexico (Salvador Durán)

Main Race
- 1st: Canada (Sean McIntosh)
- 2nd: Malaysia (Alex Yoong)
- 3rd: Australia (Marcus Marshall)

Fast Lap
- FL: Ireland (Ralph Firman)
- Time: 1'19.029, (Lap ? of Main Race)

Official Classifications

Layout of the Sentul International Circuit

The 2005–06 A1 Grand Prix of Nations, Indonesia is an A1 Grand Prix race which was held on the weekend of 12 February 2006 at the Sentul International Circuit.

== Report ==
=== Postponement ===
The 2005–06 A1 Grand Prix of Nations, Indonesia was originally scheduled to be held on 15 January 2006. This changed on 4 January 2006 however, due to the unexpected death of Sheikh Maktoum bin Rashid Al Maktoum, the Emir of Dubai and the uncle of A1 Grand Prix launcher Maktoum Hasher Maktoum Al Maktoum the day before. This postponement was prompted due to the traditional forty-day mourning period. Tony Teixeira, CEO of A1 Grand Prix stated:

"The entire staff, team owners and associates of the A1 Grand Prix family mourn the loss of a great visionary and benevolent ruler of Dubai, His Highness Sheikh bin Rashid Al Maktoum. While difficult logistically, we felt it important to observe a respectable period of mourning for this beloved family member of our founder, president and chairman, Sheikh Maktoum. Condolences and sympathies are respectfully offered to all the people of Dubai."

On the following day, the A1 Grand Prix and the Indonesian race organizers agreed to run the race on 12 February, changing its order in the schedule from that of the seventh to the eighth race of the eleven-race season.

== Results ==
=== Qualifying ===
Qualifying took place on Saturday, 11 February 2006.

Pos.	Country	Driver	Time
1	Great Britain	Robbie Kerr	2min 34.257secs
2	France	Nicolas Lapierre	2min 34.477secs
3	Mexico	Salvador Durán	2min 34.554secs
4	Switzerland	Neel Jani	2min 35.065secs
5	Japan	Hayanari Shimoda	2min 35.190secs
6	Malaysia	Alex Yoong	2min 35.447secs
7	Ireland	Ralph Firman	2min 35.670secs
8	Canada	Sean McIntosh	2min 35.685secs
9	South Africa	Stephen Simpson	2min 35.750secs
10	New Zealand	Matt Halliday	2min 35.797secs
11	Portugal	Álvaro Parente	2min 35.808secs
12	Czech Republic	Tomáš Enge	2min 35.950secs
13	Netherlands	Jos Verstappen	2min 36.000secs
14	United States	Phil Giebler	2min 36.113secs
15	Germany	Timo Scheider	2min 36.319secs
16	Italy	Max Busnelli	2min 36.631secs
17	Indonesia	Ananda Mikola	2min 36.805secs
18	China	Tengyi Jiang	2min 37.313secs
19	Australia	Marcus Marshall	2min 37.950secs
20	Lebanon	Basil Shaaban	2min 38.275secs
21	Brazil	Christian Fittipaldi	2min 38.290secs
22	Austria	Mathias Lauda	2min 39.229secs
23	India	Armaan Ebrahim	2min 40.261secs

=== Sprint race ===
The sprint race took place on Sunday, 12 February 2006.

Pos	Team	Driver	Laps	Time	Points
1	France	Nicolas Lapierre	18	24:03.360	10
2	(United Kingdom) Great Britain	Robbie Kerr	18	24:10.341	9
3	Mexico	Salvador Durán	18	24:11.387	8
4	Malaysia	Alex Yoong	18	24:14.682	7
5	Switzerland	Neel Jani	18	24:16.220	6
6	(Republic of Ireland) Ireland	Ralph Firman	18	24:17.094	5
7	Netherlands	Jos Verstappen	18	24:17.864	4
8	New Zealand	Matt Halliday	18	24:19.669	3
9	Japan	Hayanari Shimoda	18	24:22.074	2
10	Czech Republic	Tomáš Enge	18	24:26.482	1
11	Indonesia	Ananda Mikola	18	24:26.666	
12	Germany	Timo Scheider	18	24:27.761	
13	Austria	Mathias Lauda	18	24:32.882	
14	Italy	Max Busnelli	18	24:35.547	
15	(United States) USA	Phil Giebler	18	24:39.755	
16	Australia	Marcus Marshall	18	24:41.317	
17	Lebanon	Basil Shaaban	18	24:48.545	
18	India	Armaan Ebrahim	18	25:03.649	
19	Portugal	Álvaro Parente	18	27:23.194	
20	Brazil	Christian Fittipaldi	17	+1 Laps	
21	South Africa	Stephen Simpson	15	+2 Laps	
22	China	Tengyi Jiang	5	+13 Laps	
23	Canada	Sean McIntosh	1	+17 Laps	

=== Main race ===
The main race took place on Sunday, 12 February 2006.

Pos	Team	Driver	Laps	Time	Points
1	Canada	Sean McIntosh	36	55:55.779	10
2	Malaysia	Alex Yoong	36	55:57.710	9
3	Australia	Marcus Marshall	36	56:08.396	8
4	Brazil	Christian Fittipaldi	36	56:09.779	7
5	Switzerland	Neel Jani	36	56:12.288	6
6	Netherlands	Jos Verstappen	36	56:17.625	5
7	New Zealand	Matt Halliday	36	56:17.998	4
8	France	Nicolas Lapierre	36	56:18.477	3
9	(United States) USA	Phil Giebler	36	56:22.092	2
10	(United Kingdom) Great Britain	Robbie Kerr	36	56:38.748	1
11	South Africa	Stephen Simpson	36	57:10.293	
12	Germany	Timo Scheider	36	57:28.763	
13	Czech Republic	Tomáš Enge	35	+1 Lap	
14	Indonesia	Ananda Mikola	35	+1 Lap	
15	India	Armaan Ebrahim	35	+1 Lap	
16	Italy	Max Busnelli	31	+5 Laps	
17	Portugal	Álvaro Parente	31	+5 Laps	
18	Austria	Mathias Lauda	24	+12 Laps	
19	(Republic of Ireland) Ireland	Ralph Firman	21	+15 Laps	
20	Mexico	Salvador Duran	18	+18 Laps	
21	China	Tengyi Jiang	11	+25 Laps	
22	Lebanon	Basil Shaaban	7	+29 Laps	
23	Japan	Hayanari Shimoda	0	+36 Laps	
