= 2007 Brno A1GP round =

Coordinates: 49°12′18″N 16°27′8.7″E

2007-08 A1GP of Czech Republic

Race Details
- Race 2 of 10 in the 2007-08 A1 Grand Prix season
- Date: October 14, 2007
- Location: Brno Circuit; Brno, Czech Republic
- Weather: Clear, 11°C

Sprint race

Qualifying
- Pole: South Africa (Adrian Zaugg)
- Time: 1'44.859

Podium
- 1st: New Zealand (Jonny Reid)
- 2nd: Great Britain (Robbie Kerr)
- 3rd: Ireland (Adam Carroll)

Fastest Lap
- FL: New Zealand (Jonny Reid)
- Time: 1'48.438, (Lap 5)

Feature race

Qualifying
- Pole: Netherlands (J.Bleekemolen)
- Time: 1'44.649

Podium
- 1st: New Zealand (Jonny Reid)
- 2nd: Netherlands (J.Bleekemolen)
- 3rd: Switzerland (Neel Jani)

Fastest Lap
- FL: China (Cong Fu Cheng)
- Time: 1'47.610, (Lap 29)

Official Classifications
- PDF Booklet

The 2007–08 A1 Grand Prix of Nations, Czech Republic was an A1 Grand Prix race, held on October 14, 2007, at the Masaryk Circuit in Brno, Czech Republic. This was the second meeting in the 2007-08 A1 Grand Prix season.

The sprint race was won by New Zealand as was the Feature race.

== Pre-race ==
Swiss driver Natacha Gachnang was the first ever woman to enter in A1GP weekend, on Friday, during rookies sessions.

== Qualifications ==
Sprint race qualifications
Pos	Team	Time	Gap
1	South Africa	1'44.859	-
2	New Zealand	1'45.077	+0.218
3	(United Kingdom) Great Britain	1'45.163	+0.304
4	(Republic of Ireland) Ireland	1'45.304	+0.445
5	Netherlands	1'45.359	+0.500
6	Switzerland	1'45.367	+0.508
7	Germany	1'45.409	+0.550
8	Portugal	1'45.822	+0.963
9	Brazil	1'45.993	+1.134
10	France	1'46.007	+1.148
11	China	1'46.387	+1.528
12	India	1'46.423	+1.564
13	Pakistan	1'46.752	+1.893
14	(United States) USA	1'46.780	+1.921
15	Mexico	1'46.901	+2.042
16	Italy	1'47.098	+2.239
17	Indonesia	1'47.231	+2.372
18	Malaysia	1'47.463	+2.604
19	Australia	1'47.521	+2.662
20	Canada	1'47.538	+2.679
21	Czech Republic	1'47.918	+3.059
22	Lebanon	1'48.249	+3.390

Main race qualifications
Pos	Team	Time	Gap
1	Netherlands	1'44.649	-
2	South Africa	1'44.872	+0.223
3	(United Kingdom) Great Britain	1'44.927	+0.278
4	Switzerland	1'45.099	+0.450
5	China	1'45.294	+0.645
6	Brazil	1'45.328	+0.679
7	New Zealand	1'45.471	+0.822
8	France	1'45.701	+1.052
9	Germany	1'45.765	+1.116
10	Canada	1'45.889	+1.240
11	India	1'45.918	+1.269
12	Italy	1'46.023	+1.374
13	Mexico	1'46.204	+1.555
14	Australia	1'46.209	+1.560
15	Indonesia	1'46.531	+1.882
16	Portugal	1'46.783	+2.134
17	Czech Republic	1'46.926	+2.277
18	(Republic of Ireland) Ireland	1'47.028	+2.379
19	Pakistan	1'47.038	+2.389
20	(United States) USA	1'47.390	+2.741
21	Lebanon	1'48.012	+3.363
22	Malaysia	1'59.718	+15.069

== Sprint race ==
The Sprint Race took place on Sunday, October 14, 2007

Pos	Team	Driver	Laps	Time	Grid	Points
1	New Zealand	Jonny Reid	10	18'11.609	2	15+1
2	(United Kingdom) Great Britain	Robbie Kerr	10	+5.952	3	12
3	(Republic of Ireland) Ireland	Adam Carroll	10	+8.824	4	10
4	South Africa	Adrian Zaugg	10	+10.269	1	8
5	Netherlands	Jeroen Bleekemolen	10	+11.561	5	6
6	France	Nicolas Lapierre	10	+11.803	10	5
7	Germany	Christian Vietoris	10	+13.200	7	4
8	Switzerland	Neel Jani	10	+13.447	6	3
9	Portugal	João Urbano	10	+18.570	8	2
10	China	Congfu Cheng	10	+18.801	11	1
11	Brazil	Sérgio Jimenez	10	+22.172	9	
12	Canada	James Hinchcliffe	10	+23.996	20	
13	Mexico	Michel Jourdain Jr.	10	+24.927	15	
14	Italy	Enrico Toccacelo	10	+25.922	16	
15	Pakistan	Adam Langley-Khan	10	+28.763	13	
16	(United States) USA	Buddy Rice	10	+31.076	14	
17	Malaysia	Alex Yoong	10	+33.661	18	
18	Czech Republic	Erik Janis	10	+34.715	21	
19	Indonesia	Satrio Hermanto	10	+48.189	17	
20	Lebanon	Khalil Beschir	10	+49.830	22	
21	India	Narain Karthikeyan	10	+1'37.816	12	
Ret	Australia	Ian Dyk	3	+7 Laps	19	

== Main Race ==
The Main Race took place also on Sunday, October 14, 2007.

Pos	Team	Driver	Laps	Time	Grid	Points
1	New Zealand	Jonny Reid	38	1:10'34.700	7	15
2	Netherlands	Jeroen Bleekemolen	38	+7.146	1	12
3	Switzerland	Neel Jani	38	+12.277	4	10
4	China	Cong Fu Cheng	38	+12.723	5	8+1
5	France	Nicolas Lapierre	38	+19.439	8	6
6	(Republic of Ireland) Ireland	Adam Carroll	38	+24.348	18	5
7	Brazil	Sérgio Jimenez	38	+29.625	6	4
8	Germany	Christian Vietoris	38	+37.949	9	3
9	India	Narain Karthikeyan	38	+38.385	11	2
10	Italy	Enrico Toccacelo	38	+49.406	12	
11	Canada	James Hinchcliffe	38	+51.531	10	
12	Czech Republic	Erik Janis	38	+57.799	17	
13	Australia	Ian Dyk	38	+1'02.548	14	
14	Malaysia	Alex Yoong	38	+1'03.238	22	
15	(United States) USA	Buddy Rice	38	+1'22.790	20	
16	South Africa	Adrian Zaugg	38	+1'23.100	2	
17	(United Kingdom) Great Britain	Robbie Kerr	38	+1'23.733	3	
18	Portugal	João Urbano	38	+1'24.918	16	
19	Indonesia	Satrio Hermanto	38	+1'25.337	15	
20	Pakistan	Adam Langley-Khan	38	+1'31.515	19	
21	Lebanon	Khalil Beschir	37	+1 Lap	21	
22	Mexico	Michel Jourdain Jr.	37	+1 Lap	13	

== Notes ==
- It was the 24th race weekend (48 starts)
- It was the 2nd Czech grand prix and 2nd in Brno Circuit
- It was the first race for Adam Carroll and Michel Jourdain Jr.
- It was the first race weekend for Paolo Bossini, Adam Carroll, Natacha Gachnang, Michel Jourdain Jr., Charlie Kimball, Marchy Lee, Arie Luyendyk Jr., John Martin, Wesleigh Orr, Nicolas Prost and Robert Wickens.
- Records:
  - South Africa take 6 poles position.
  - A1 Team Lebanon participate on 24 races (48 starts) without won points since their first Grand Prix.
  - Alex Yoong participate on 23 races (44 starts).
  - Neel Jani won 169 points.
