= 2007 Sepang A1GP round =

2007-08 A1GP of Malaysia

Race Details
- Race 3 of 10 in the 2007-08 A1 Grand Prix season
- Date: November 25, 2007
- Location: Sepang International Circuit; Sepang, Malaysia
- Weather: Fine

Sprint race

Qualifying
- Pole: Switzerland (Neel Jani)
- Time: 1'48.630

Podium
- 1st: Switzerland (Neel Jani)
- 2nd: France (Loïc Duval)
- 3rd: Canada (Robert Wickens)

Fastest Lap
- FL: Switzerland (Neel Jani)
- Time: 1'49.221, (Lap 10)

Feature race

Qualifying
- Pole: Switzerland (Neel Jani)
- Time: 1'47.648

Podium
- 1st: Switzerland (Neel Jani)
- 2nd: France (Loïc Duval)
- 3rd: Brazil (Sérgio Jimenez)

Fastest Lap
- FL: Switzerland (Neel Jani)
- Time: 1'49.260, (Lap 25)

Official Classifications
- PDF Booklet

The 2007–08 A1 Grand Prix of Nations, Malaysia is an A1 Grand Prix race, to be held on November 25, 2007, at the Sepang International Circuit in Sepang, Malaysia. This will be the third meeting in the 2007-08 A1 Grand Prix season and the 50th start in the A1 Grand Prix history.

== Pre-race ==
Swiss driver Rahel Frey was the second ever woman to enter in A1GP weekend, on Friday, during rookies sessions. Her compatriot Natacha Gachnang drove the rookies sessions in Czech round also in 2007.

== Qualifications ==
Neel Jani clocked the best lap time of the weekend in the sprint race qualifications and improve this in the main race qualifications in 1'47.648. Swiss driver demonstrate his superiority in the Sepang circuit and take a double pole for Sunday races.

The Lebanese cars was found to be under the minimum weight limit during main race qualifying. A1 Team Lebanon start from the back of the grid (22nd), instead of 18th, because of the Chris Alajajian car was found 3 kg under the 705 kg minimum weight limit.

Sprint race qualifications
Pos	Team	Time	Gap
1	Switzerland	1'48.630	-
2	France	1'48.845	+0.215
3	(United Kingdom) Great Britain	1'48.864	+0.234
4	Germany	1'49.219	+0.589
5	Canada	1'49.252	+0.622
6	New Zealand	1'49.330	+0.700
7	Brazil	1'49.376	+0.746
8	South Africa	1'49.525	+0.895
9	China	1'49.535	+0.905
10	Netherlands	1'49.677	+1.047
11	(United States) USA	1'49.758	+1.128
12	Australia	1'49.898	+1.268
13	(Republic of Ireland) Ireland	1'49.915	+1.285
14	India	1'50.226	+1.596
15	Portugal	1'50.329	+1.699
16	Mexico	1'50.364	+1.734
17	Czech Republic	1'50.401	+1.771
18	Italy	1'50.546	+1.916
19	Malaysia	1'50.653	+2.023
20	Lebanon	1'50.775	+2.145
21	Indonesia	1'51.618	+2.988
22	Pakistan	1'51.819	+3.189

Main race qualifications
Pos	Team	Time	Gap
1	Switzerland	1'47.648	-
2	(United Kingdom) Great Britain	1'48.608	+0.960
3	Germany	1'48.736	+1.088
4	France	1'48.807	+1.159
5	Netherlands	1'49.021	+1.373
6	Brazil	1'49.110	+1.462
7	(Republic of Ireland) Ireland	1'49.248	+1.600
8	China	1'49.308	+1.600
9	South Africa	1'49.324	+1.676
10	New Zealand	1'49.353	+1.705
11	India	1'49.543	+1.895
12	Canada	1'49.642	+1.994
13	(United States) USA	1'49.818	+2.170
14	Australia	1'49.868	+2.220
15	Malaysia	1'49.997	+2.349
16	Czech Republic	1'50.020	+2.372
17	Portugal	1'50.109	+2.461
18	Italy	1'50.193	+2.545
19	Indonesia	1'50.651	+3.003
20	Mexico	1'50.869	+3.221
21	Pakistan	1'50.871	+3.223
22	Lebanon	1'51.161	+3.513

== Sprint race ==
At the start of the sprint race, conditions were warm and humid, with the temperature being 29 °C and the humidity level at 78%. Canada's Robert Wickens lost one position at turn one, while Great Britain's Oliver Jarvis and France's Loïc Duval collided. The British driver was forced back to 6th with damage to the front wing of his car. Still on the first lap, China's Cong Fu Cheng was hit by New Zealand's Jonny Reid, losing many positions as a result. Alex Yoong, driver for the Malaysian team, experienced the best opening lap, moving up from 19th to 11th.

On lap 3, Cong Fu Cheng (China) retired from the race, stopped at the side of the track. Jonny Reid (New Zealand) took over 6th from Oliver Jarvis (Great Britain) after passing on the front straight on lap 5. On the next lap, Jeroen Bleekemolen (Netherlands) passed Adam Carroll (Ireland) for 8th.

On the final lap, Michael Ammermüller (Germany) collided with Wickens (Canada) at turn two, overtaking for the final spot on the podium. Switzerland took the checkered flag, winning the race and securing the fastest lap, followed by France and Germany. Neel Jani dominated from start to finish, achieving pole, the fastest lap (1'49.221) and victory.

Jeroen Bleekemolen was found to have jumped the rolling start, with stewards handing down a penalty of 25 seconds (the equivalent time loss to a drive-through penalty) after the end of the race. The result moved them from 8th to 18th position, taking away the three points they had originally scored.

Germany's collision with Canada on the final lap was deemed avoidable, and the team was demoted from 3rd to 16th place as a consequence.

Both of these demotions promoted Yoong to 9th, giving Malaysia their first two points of the season. Ammermüller's penalty also allowed Wickens to finish on the podium in 3rd.

Pos	Team	Driver	Laps	Time	Grid	Points
1	Switzerland	Neel Jani	10	18'20.910	1	15+1
2	France	Loïc Duval	10	+3.792	2	12
3	Canada	Robert Wickens	10	+13.127	5	10
4	Brazil	Sérgio Jimenez	10	+13.737	7	8
5	New Zealand	Jonny Reid	10	+14.476	6	6
6	(United Kingdom) Great Britain	Oliver Jarvis	10	+14.937	3	5
7	(Republic of Ireland) Ireland	Adam Carroll	10	+19.679	13	4
8	Italy	Enrico Toccacelo	10	+23.221	18	3
9	Malaysia	Alex Yoong	10	+23.587	19	2
10	South Africa	Adrian Zaugg	10	+25.105	8	1
11	India	Narain Karthikeyan	10	+25.204	14	
12	(United States) USA	Jonathan Summerton	10	+26.527	11	
13	Portugal	João Urbano	10	+27.772	15	
14	Lebanon	Chris Alajajian	10	+34.121	20	
15	Czech Republic	Erik Janis	10	+36.328	17	
16	Germany	Michael Ammermüller	10	+36.935	4	
17	Pakistan	Adam Langley-Khan	10	+37.546	22	
18	Netherlands	Jeroen Bleekemolen	10	+40.327	10	
19	Indonesia	Satrio Hermanto	10	+44.820	21	
20	Mexico	Michel Jourdain Jr.	10	+47.416	16	
Ret	China	Cong Fu Cheng	1	Mechanical	9	
Ret	Australia	Ian Dyk	0	Collision	12	

== Main race ==
There is 32 °C and 66% of humidity for the second start of the Malaysian round. The two mandatories pit stop should occur between 8th and 14th laps and between 22nd and 30th laps.
At the first corner, a collision get involve Canada, USA, Portugal, China, Australia and Czech Republic. The Portuguese car stuck in the gravel. After a great start jumping ninth, Malaysia and New Zealand collide in the second lap. Then both team must pass by stand. Robert Wickens (Canada) hits Adrian Zaugg (South Africa) while he tried to get his car back on track after spins out on lap 8, turn seven. Then both driver retire and the safety car is out.
Meanwhile, Malaysia and New Zealand can catch up the end of the file after their collide on lap 2. The pit stop window is open and cars were stationary at the end of the pit lane with red light. On green light, Brazil got the better start behind Switzerland, Great Britain, France, Germany and Netherlands. The safety car go back and the race restart on lap 12. Oliver Jarvis (Great Britain) passes Neel Jani (Switzerland) into the second corner but the Swiss driver go by Jarvis and Loïc Duval sneaks by too. In lap 14, Brazil set the fastest lap. Switzerland catch up Brazil, New Zealand attempt to passes Pakistan but is well defending, Ireland make mistake and drops from seventh to 10th.
In lap 18, Enrico Toccacelo (Italy) is in the pit and renounce. In turn 2, lap 20, German rookie driver, Michael Ammermüller hit unfairly Great Britain and drops to 5th, Jarvis is now 6th. Germany receive a drive-through penalty. For lap 23, the pit lane is open for the second stops. Jeroen Bleekemolen (Netherlands) passes Loïc Duval (France) for 2nd place. In lap 25, Great Britain take the fast lap just before is pit stop where is too fast in the pit lane and receive a drive-through penalty. Switzerland set the fast lap at its turn. Again, at turn 2, lap 29, Michael Ammermüller collide unfairly Erik Janis (Czech Republic) and passes.
After second mandatory pit stop closed, Switzerland is behind Brazil and France. Mexico, Great Britain, USA and Australia are still battling for position. Great Britain gets by Mexico in lap 34 and Ian Dyk (Australia) passes Jonathan Summerton (USA) in final lap. Oliver Jarvis drops USA too.
The final top ten was: Switzerland, Brazil, France, Netherlands, China, India, Ireland, New Zealand, Australia and Great Britain.

After the race, A1 teams Brazil and Great Britain were penalised to stay stationary at a red light during safety-car period on at the pit exit after their first mandatory pit stops. Both teams have been retrogressed of 2 seconds to their total race time. Brazilian team lose one position (2nd to 3rd) and Great Britain lose 2 positions (10th to 12th) in their final feature race results.

Germany, with its driver Michael Ammermüller, was excluded from the final main race results. In lap 19, the German team cause an avoidable collision with Great Britain and was sanctioned with a drive-through penalty but in lap 28, Germany reiterate an avoidable collision with Czech Republic. The final results before exclusion of Germany was 13th.

Neel Jani accomplish the perfect weekend with 2 pole positions, 2 wins and 2 fast laps.

Pos	Team	Driver	Laps	Time	Grid	Points
1	Switzerland	Neel Jani	35	1:08'13.459	1	15+1
2	France	Loïc Duval	35	+8.928	4	12
3	Brazil	Sérgio Jimenez	35	+10.414	6	10
4	Netherlands	Jeroen Bleekemolen	35	+11.222	5	8
5	China	Cong Fu Cheng	35	+17.354	8	6
6	India	Narain Karthikeyan	35	+17.594	11	5
7	(Republic of Ireland) Ireland	Adam Carroll	35	+19.372	7	4
8	New Zealand	Jonny Reid	35	+20.397	10	3
9	Australia	Ian Dyk	35	+44.294	14	2
10	(United States) USA	Jonathan Summerton	35	+44.549	13	1
11	Mexico	Michel Jourdain Jr.	35	+44.715	20	
12	(United Kingdom) Great Britain	Oliver Jarvis	35	+46.359	2	
13	Malaysia	Alex Yoong	35	+48.795	15	
14	Pakistan	Adam Langley-Khan	35	+56.877	21	
15	Czech Republic	Erik Janis	35	+58.319	16	
16	Indonesia	Satrio Hermanto	35	+1'20.906	19	
Ret	Lebanon	Chris Alajajian	26	Mechanical	22	
Ret	Italy	Enrico Toccacelo	17	Mechanical	18	
Ret	South Africa	Adrian Zaugg	7	Collision	9	
Ret	Canada	Robert Wickens	7	Collision	12	
Ret	Portugal	João Urbano	0	Collision	17	
DSQ	Germany	Michael Ammermüller	35	+46.409	3	

== Notes ==
- Main race was the 50th start and 25th race weekend.
- It was the first race for Michael Ammermüller and Robert Wickens in A1 Grand Prix.
- It was the first race weekend for Michael Ammermüller, Earl Bamber, Rahel Frey and Edoardo Piscopo.
- It was the 3rd venue in the Sepang International Circuit and the 3rd Malaysian Grand Prix.
- Records :
  - A1 Team Lebanon participate on 25 races (50 starts) without won points since their first Grand Prix.
  - 26th podium for A1 Team France.
  - Alex Yoong participate on 24 races (46 starts).
  - Neel Jani won 201 points.
