= 2007 Zandvoort A1GP round =

2007-08 A1GP of Netherlands

Race Details
- Race 1 of 10 in the 2007-08 A1 Grand Prix season
- Date: September 30, 2007
- Location: Circuit Park Zandvoort; Zandvoort, Netherlands

Sprint race

Qualifying
- Pole: South Africa (Adrian Zaugg)
- Time: 1'45.095

Podium
- 1st: South Africa (Adrian Zaugg)
- 2nd: France (Loïc Duval)
- 3rd: Netherlands (J.Bleekemolen)

Fastest Lap
- FL: South Africa (Adrian Zaugg)
- Time: 1'28.353, (Lap 2)

Feature race

Qualifying
- Pole: South Africa (Adrian Zaugg)
- Time: 1'43.979

Podium
- 1st: Great Britain (Oliver Jarvis)
- 2nd: South Africa (Adrian Zaugg)
- 3rd: Switzerland (Neel Jani)

Fastest Lap
- FL: Mexico (Salvador Durán)
- Time: 1'29.181, (Lap 37)

Official Classifications
- PDF Booklet

The 2007–08 A1 Grand Prix of Nations, Netherlands was an A1 Grand Prix race, held on September 30, 2007, at the Circuit Park Zandvoort in Zandvoort, Netherlands. This was the first in the 2007-08 A1 Grand Prix season.

The sprint race was won by A1 Team South Africa, while the Great Britain car won the Feature Race. With South Africa getting second place in the Feature Race, they took the early lead in the championship.

== Pre-race ==
Due to Zandvoort's noise restriction, Netherlands round wasn't able to conduct Friday sessions and so rookie session. Saturday morning was dedicated to practice sessions and Saturday afternoon to qualify sessions for each Sunday race.

== Qualifications ==
Sprint race qualifications
Pos	Team	Time	Gap
1	South Africa	1'45.095	-
2	France	1'45.431	+0.336
3	Mexico	1'46.198	+1.103
4	Switzerland	1'46.728	+1.633
5	Netherlands	1'46.791	+1.696
6	Germany	1'47.056	+1.961
7	(Republic of Ireland) Ireland	1'47.343	+2.248
8	New Zealand	1'47.531	+2.436
9	Portugal	1'47.570	+2.475
10	(United Kingdom) Great Britain	1'47.748	+2.653
11	India	1'48.415	+3.320
12	Brazil	1'49.083	+3.988
13	Italy	1'49.099	+4.004
14	Czech Republic	1'49.444	+4.349
15	China	1'49.746	+4.651
16	Pakistan	1'50.352	+5.257
17	Australia	1'50.553	+5.458
18	Lebanon	1'50.716	+5.621
19	(United States) USA	1'52.479	+7.384
20	Malaysia	1'52.543	+7.448
21	Canada	1'52.789	+7.694
22	Indonesia	1'55.381	+10.286

Main race qualifications
Pos	Team	Time	Gap
1	South Africa	1'43.979	-
2	Germany	1'44.670	+0.691
3	(United Kingdom) Great Britain	1'45.143	+1.164
4	Switzerland	1'45.599	+1.620
5	France	1'45.691	+1.712
6	(Republic of Ireland) Ireland	1'45.752	+1.773
7	Czech Republic	1'45.772	+1.793
8	Mexico	1'45.797	+1.818
9	India	1'45.993	+2.014
10	New Zealand	1'46.169	+2.190
11	Netherlands	1'46.554	+2.575
12	Canada	1'46.739	+2.760
13	Brazil	1'47.562	+3.583
14	Italy	1'48.297	+4.318
15	China	1'48.331	+4.352
16	Australia	1'48.423	+4.444
17	Pakistan	1'48.819	+4.840
18	Lebanon	1'49.899	+5.920
19	(United States) USA	1'49.924	+5.945
20	Malaysia	1'49.978	+5.999
21	Indonesia	1'52.708	+8.729
22	Portugal	no time	

== Sprint Race ==
The Sprint Race took place on Sunday, September 30, 2007

Pos	Team	Driver	Laps	Time	Grid	Points
1	South Africa	Adrian Zaugg	12	18'01.087	1	15+1
2	France	Loïc Duval	12	+7.532	2	12
3	Netherlands	Jeroen Bleekemolen	12	+8.097	5	10
4	Mexico	Salvador Durán	12	+8.205	3	8
5	Switzerland	Neel Jani	12	+8.581	4	6
6	Germany	Christian Vietoris	12	+10.344	6	5
7	(United Kingdom) Great Britain	Oliver Jarvis	12	+10.566	10	4
8	(Republic of Ireland) Ireland	Ralph Firman	12	+12.168	7	3
9	New Zealand	Jonny Reid	12	+13.934	8	2
10	India	Narain Karthikeyan	12	+18.516	11	1
11	Portugal	João Urbano	12	+24.967	9	
12	Italy	Enrico Toccacelo	12	+25.717	13	
13	Brazil	Sérgio Jimenez	12	+26.044	12	
14	Lebanon	Chris Alajajian	12	+34.547	18	
15	Czech Republic	Erik Janis	12	+35.268	14	
16	Malaysia	Alex Yoong	12	+35.895	20	
17	China	Cong Fu Cheng	12	+36.298	15	
18	Pakistan	Adam Langley-Khan	12	+36.510	16	
19	Canada	James Hinchcliffe	12	+39.509	21	
20	Indonesia	Satrio Hermanto	12	+47.932	22	
21	Australia	Ian Dyk	12	+47.983	17	
22	(United States) USA	Buddy Rice	12	+48.208	19	

== Main Race ==
The Main Race took place also on Sunday, September 30, 2007.

Pos	Team	Driver	Laps	Time	Grid	Points
1	(United Kingdom) Great Britain	Oliver Jarvis	45	1:09'51.394	3	15
2	South Africa	Adrian Zaugg	45	+5.742	1	12
3	Switzerland	Neel Jani	45	+7.974	4	10
4	Mexico	Salvador Durán	45	+11.516	8	8+1
5	France	Loïc Duval	45	+25.789	5	6
6	(Republic of Ireland) Ireland	Ralph Firman	45	+33.697	6	5
7	New Zealand	Jonny Reid	45	+47.635	10	4
8	Netherlands	Jeroen Bleekemolen	45	+49.270	11	3
9	Germany	Christian Vietoris	45	+49.876	2	2
10	Czech Republic	Erik Janis	45	+59.664	7	1
11	Brazil	Sérgio Jimenez	45	+1'00.078	13	
12	Australia	Ian Dyk	45	+1'30.593	16	
13	(United States) USA	Buddy Rice	45	+1'31.148	19	
14	Italy	Enrico Toccacelo	44	+1 Lap	14	
15	China	Cong Fu Cheng	44	+1 Lap	15	
16	Indonesia	Satrio Hermanto	44	+1 Lap	21	
17	Pakistan	Adam Langley-Khan	43	+2 Laps	17	
18	Canada	James Hinchcliffe	40	+5 Laps	12	
19	Lebanon	Chris Alajajian	40	+5 Laps	18	
Ret	India	Narain Karthikeyan	13	+32 Laps	9	
Ret	Malaysia	Alex Yoong	8	+37 Laps	20	
Ret	Portugal	João Urbano	2	+43 Laps	22	

- Mexico won the Feature race fastest lap point with a lap time of 1'29.181 therefore giving them an extra point on top of their 4th-place finish points.

== Notes ==
- It was the 23rd race weekend (46 starts)
- It was the 2nd race in the Circuit Park Zandvoort and the 2nd in Netherlands.
- It was the first race for Chris Alajajian, Satrio Hermanto, Erik Janiš, Sérgio Jimenez and Buddy Rice.
- It was the first race weekend for Chris Alajajian, Satrio Hermanto, Erik Janiš, Sérgio Jimenez and Buddy Rice.
- Records:
  - South Africa take 5 poles position.
  - A1 Team Lebanon participate on 23 races (46 starts) without won points since their first Grand Prix.
  - Alex Yoong participate on 22 races (42 starts).
  - Neel Jani won 156 points.
  - Erik Janiš became the 100th A1GP race driver.
