= Jonny Reid =

New Zealand racing driver

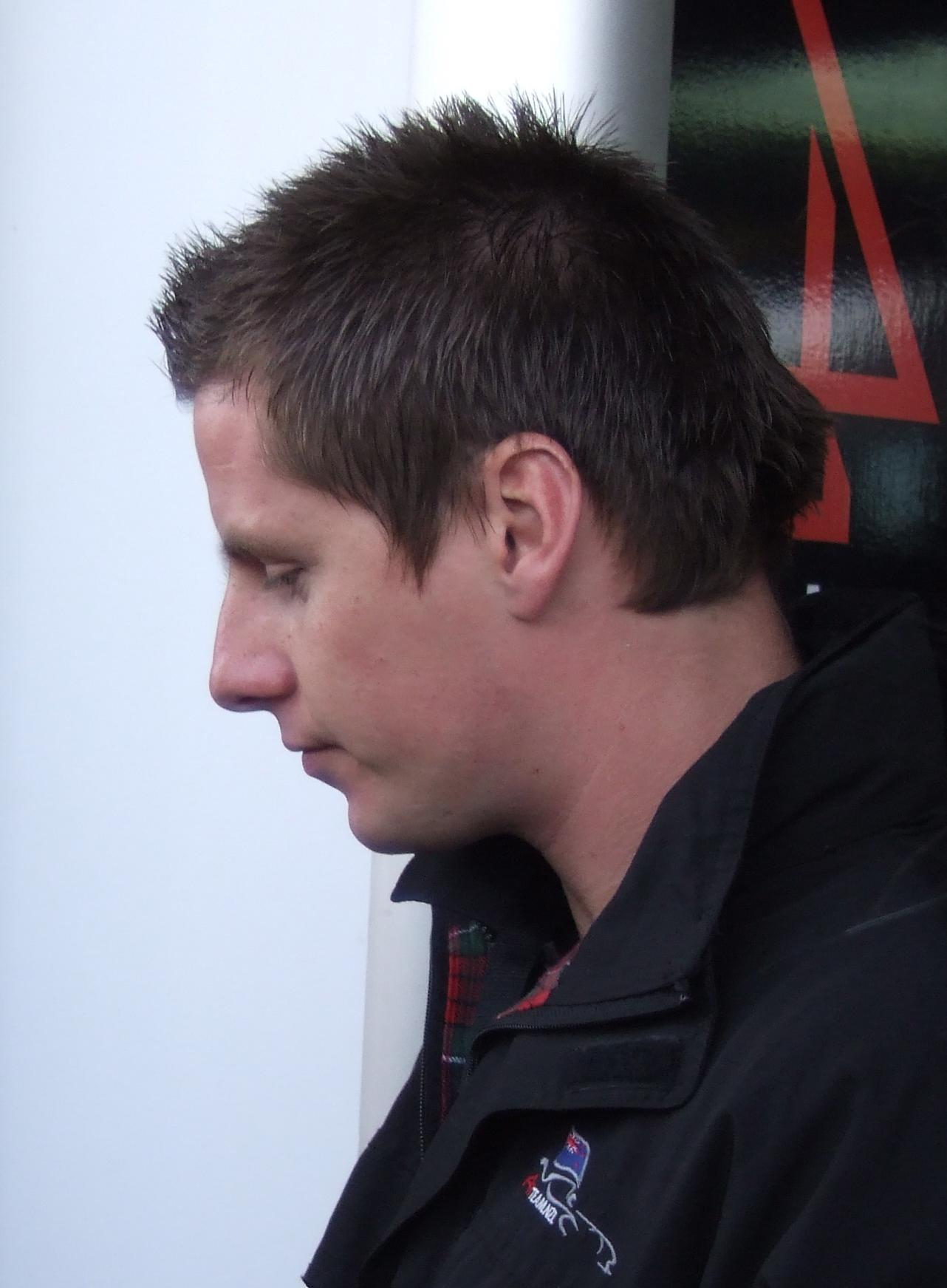
- Reid at Brands Hatch in 2008
- Nationality: (New Zealand) New Zealander
- Born: 18 October 1983 (age 43) Auckland, New Zealand

V8 Supercars
- Years active: 2003, 2012–2013
- Teams: Robert Smith Racing; Tekno Autosports; Dick Johnson Racing; Tony D'Alberto Racing
- Starts: 16
- Wins: 0
- Poles: 0
- Fastest laps: 0

Previous series
- 2012 2010 2008 2005–2008 2005–2006 2004 2003 2002–2003: V8SuperTourer; Auto GP; Indy Lights; A1 GP; Japanese Formula 3 Euroseries 3000; Australian Drivers' Champ. New Zealand Formula Ford

Championship titles
- 2003 2003: New Zealand Formula Ford; New Zealand Grand Prix

Awards
- 2008: Jim Clark Trophy

Jonathan Ross "Jonny" Reid (born 18 October 1983 in Auckland) is a New Zealand racing driver.

== Career ==
=== Early career ===
Reid started his career in karting at the age of eight. In 1996, Reid won his first title, the New Zealand North Island Championship in the rookie class. In 1997, he went on to win the North Island Championship in the Junior Class. In 1998, he won the North Island Championship again, this time in the Junior Intercontinental Class. In 1999, Reid won his first New Zealand Championship in Junior Stock which was preceded by wins in the Pro series.

In 2002, Reid won the New Zealand Formula Ford Festival for the second year in a row, the New Zealand Championship and the New Zealand Grand Prix. In 2003, Reid was awarded Motorsport New Zealand's Steel Memorial Trophy, given annually to an under-21 New Zealand racing driver who "displays dedication, skill and a level of professionalism in their driving aiming to progress to the upper echelons of the sport".

Reid drove for Graham Watson's Ralt Australia team in the 2003 Australian Drivers' Championship. He achieved second in the championship, amassing four pole positions, five race wins and three round victories. Reid finished the season with pole position and wins in both races in Round 6 at Eastern Creek.

=== V8 Supercars ===
Reid made his V8 Supercars debut in the 2003 Bathurst 1000 with Alan Gurr for Robert Smith Racing. However, he did not drive in the race itself, as Gurr was forced to retire the car after four laps due to a mechanical failure.

=== A1 Grand Prix ===
In the 2005-06 season, Reid was twice called up by New Zealand to race in the A1 Grand Prix. Together with Matt Halliday, who competed in the rest of the rounds for the team, the pair won 77 points, placing the team in fourth position overall.

Reid was called up for seven of the eleven rounds in 2006–07, with Halliday once again completing the remaining rounds. The car was dubbed 'Black Beauty' by both the team and New Zealand media. In his first round of the season at Brno Circuit, Reid qualified on pole, A1 Team New Zealand's first pole position. However, before the first corner of the sprint race, Reid collided with Nico Hülkenberg of Team Germany, leading to both drivers retiring from the race.

In the fourth round of the A1GP in Malaysia in Sepang International Circuit, Reid and Hülkenberg collided in the sprint race once again. However, Reid continued racing despite a damaged suspension and came third, Team New Zealand's first podium. After doubling Team New Zealand's points in Malaysia, Reid was selected to drive in the fifth round in Indonesia. Reid qualified on pole and won in both the sprint and feature races. This performance led to him being selected for the following event in his home country in January 2007.

"Taupo is in the back of my mind..."

"But this is a hot seat and you have to be performing the whole time if you want to keep it. I’m just looking to better my game every time I get in that car, so I’ll be pushing myself to qualify on pole and win races. That’s my focus".

Reid finished both races in New Zealand in third place. After three more rounds, including one victory in China, he and Halliday finished second in the championship, only behind Team Germany.

In 2007–08, Reid competed in all rounds of the A1GP season. He won four races, and once again finished second in the championship, this time behind Team Switzerland's Neel Jani.

As a promotion for the New Zealand round, Reid raced his A1GP car against an Air New Zealand Boeing 777-200ER passenger jet at Auckland International Airport. The first try saw the Boeing race past Reid and lift into the sky, while the second attempt saw him beat the 777 just as it was about to lift off. The car reached its top speed of 285 km/h, while the Boeing 777, with little fuel and no passengers or cargo, reached about 280 km/h before it was forced to lift into the sky.

=== Indy Lights ===
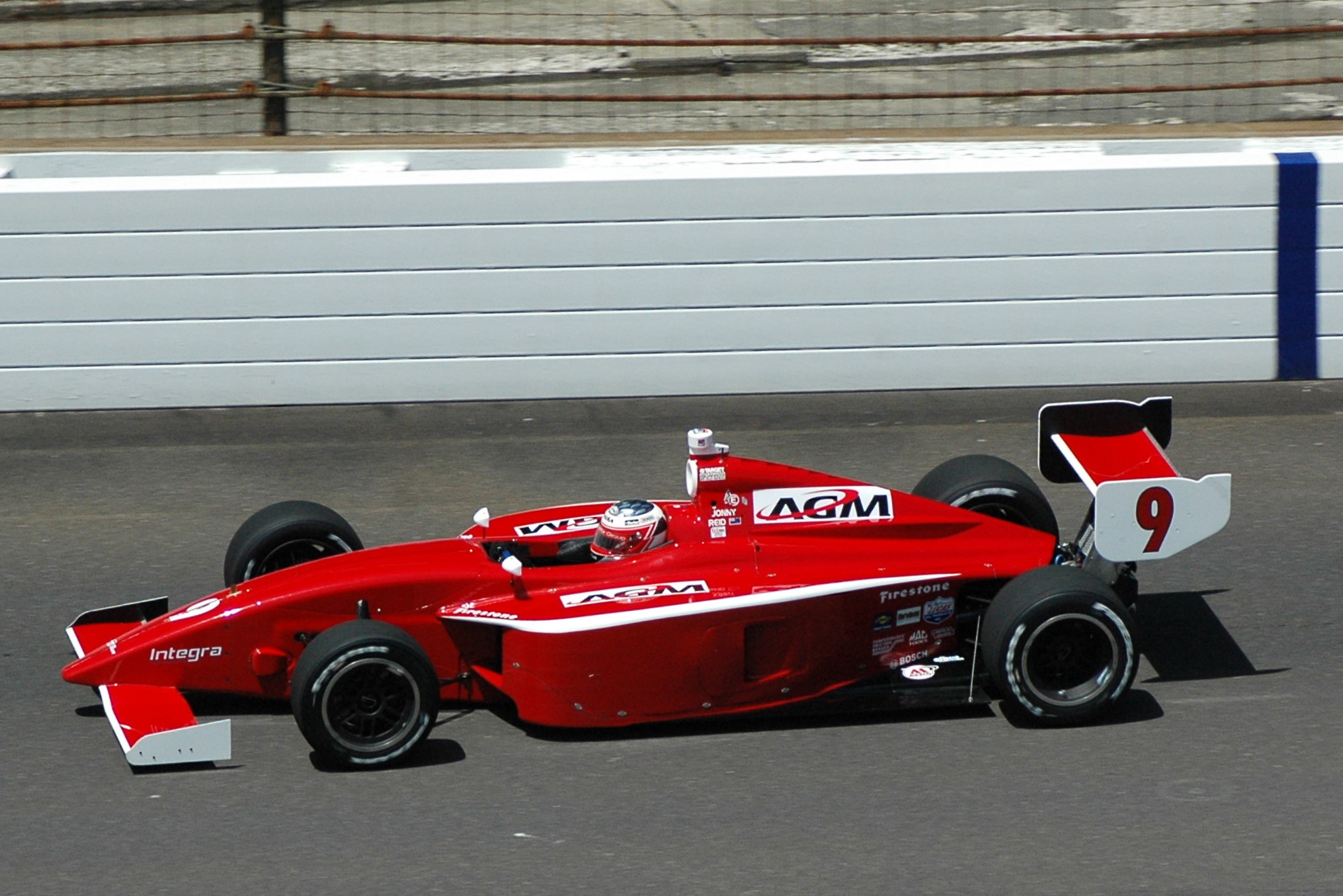
Reid making his Indy Lights debut in the Freedom 100

Reid passed his Firestone Indy Lights rookie test on 19 May 2008 at Iowa Speedway. Four days later, he made his debut for Integra Motorsports in the 2008 Firestone Freedom 100 on 23 May at the Indianapolis Motor Speedway. At Mid-Ohio Sports Car Course, Reid had a career-best start of third for Race One. He finished fourth, with the grid reversal giving him the pole for Race Two. In wet conditions amidst many Safety Car periods, Reid led most of the race, which was run to time rather than laps due to the delays. Reid took the white flag in second place behind Mitch Cunningham, but Cunningham then crashed at turn one, before a three-car incident further back involving points leader Richard Antinucci brought out the yellow flag. This effectively gave Reid the race win, but, with his radio having failed earlier, he was unclear on the situation and pitted at the end of the lap. He crossed the line in ninth place, giving the win to James Davison. Reid left Integra Motorsports and missed the next race on the schedule. He returned one round later at Infineon Raceway driving a fourth car for Sam Schmidt Motorsports.

=== Porsche Cup ===
In the 2009/10 New Zealand season, Reid raced in the New Zealand Porsche GT3 Cup, winning three races and finishing second to Craig Baird. He raced again in the 2010/11 season, this time only winning one race and finishing third in the Championship. He joined the revamped Australian Carrera Cup Championship in 2011. He finished second again to Craig Baird driving for McElrea Racing and winning three races. He won the Tudor Fastest Lap award for the most fastest laps in the championship. He also raced in the 2011 Australian GT Championship in the GT Challenge class with John Modystach winning both races they entered.

=== Return to V8 Supercars ===
In 2010, Reid returned to the V8 Supercars series, testing with four other drivers for Kelly Racing in a session designed to evaluate potential co-drivers for the endurance rounds. This was followed up by drives in practice sessions reserved for rookies and co-drivers at the Ipswich and Winton rounds, before another test for the team in June. However, this did not lead to an endurance drive.

Reid tested again in 2011, this time for Tekno Autosports. This led to him being selected by Tekno as the co-driver for Michael Patrizi in the endurance races in 2012.

In February 2013, it was announced that Reid would race full-time for Dick Johnson Racing in the 2013 season. However, he was replaced by Chaz Mostert on 19 April 2013, as Ford Performance Racing and Dick Johnson Racing expanded their partnership.

=== V8 Super Tourer ===
Reid competed in the first New Zealand V8SuperTourer season in 2012 finishing second to John McIntyre after not finishing in the second race in the final round at Hampton Downs Motorsport Park.

== Personal life ==
Reid's grandfather and his father were both known New Zealand racers. His father, Clayton Reid, was a New Zealand champion in karting.

== Racing record ==
=== Complete Euro Formula 3000 results ===
Year	Entrant	1	2	3	4	5	6	7	8	9	10	DC	Points
2004	John Village Automotive	BRN; 7	EST; Ret	JER; 3	MNZ; Ret	SPA; 6	DON; 1	DIJ; 2	ZOL; 2	NÜR1; 2	NÜR2; 5	4th	35

=== Complete A1 Grand Prix results ===
Year	Entrant	1	2	3	4	5	6	7	8	9	10	11	12	13	14	15	16	17	18	19	20	21	22	DC	Pts
2005–06	New Zealand	GBR; SPR	GBR; FEA	GER; SPR; 4	GER; FEA; 4	POR; SPR	POR; FEA	AUS; SPR; 18	AUS; FEA; 8	MYS; SPR	MYS; FEA	UAE; SPR	UAE; FEA	RSA; SPR	RSA; FEA	IDN; SPR	IDN; FEA	MEX; SPR	MEX; FEA	USA; SPR	USA; FEA	CHN; SPR	CHN; FEA	4th	77
2006–07	New Zealand	NED; SPR	NED; FEA	CZE; SPR; Ret	CZE; FEA; 7	BEI; SPR	BEI; FEA	MYS; SPR; 3	MYS; FEA; 8	IDN; SPR; 1	IDN; FEA; 1	NZL; SPR; 3	NZL; FEA; 3	AUS; SPR; 2	AUS; FEA; 2	RSA; SPR	RSA; FEA	MEX; SPR; 16	MEX; FEA; 6	SHA; SPR; 2	SHA; FEA; 1	GBR; SPR	GBR; SPR	2nd	93
2007–08	New Zealand	NED; SPR; 9	NED; FEA; 7	CZE; SPR; 1	CZE; FEA; 1	MYS; SPR; 5	MYS; FEA; 8	CHN; SPR; 10	CHN; FEA; 2	NZL; SPR; 1	NZL; FEA; 4	AUS; SPR; 2	AUS; FEA; 9	RSA; SPR; 20	RSA; FEA; 10	MEX; SPR; 1	MEX; FEA; 12	CHN; SPR; Ret	CHN; FEA; 4	GBR; SPR; 8	GBR; FEA; 8			2nd	127

=== Complete Indy Lights results ===
Year	Team	1	2	3	4	5	6	7	8	9	10	11	12	13	14	15	16	Rank	Points
2008	Integra Motorsports	HMS	STP1	STP2	KAN	INDY; 20	MIL; 15	IOW; 19	WGL1; 10	WGL2; 21	NSH; 17	MOH1; 4	MOH2; 9	KTY				18th	186
2008	Sam Schmidt Motorsports														SNM1; 9	SNM2; 19	CHI; 11	18th	186

=== Complete Auto GP results ===
Year	Entrant	1	2	3	4	5	6	7	8	9	10	11	12	DC	Points
2010	Super Nova Racing	BRN; 1; 13	BRN; 2; 7	IMO; 1; 5	IMO; 2 Ret	SPA; 1; 4	SPA; 2; 7	MAG; 1; 10	MAG; 2; 6	NAV; 1; 5	NAV; 2; 6	MNZ; 1 Ret	MNZ; 2; 14	10th	16

=== Complete V8 Supercar results ===
V8 Supercar results
Year	Team	No.	Car	1	2	3	4	5	6	7	8	9	10	11	12	13	14	15	16	17	18	19	20	21	22	23	24	25	26	27	28	29	30	31	32	33	34	35	36	37	Final pos	Points
2003	Robert Smith Racing	72	Holden VX Commodore	ADE; R1	ADE; R2	PHI; R3	EAS; R4	WIN; R5	BAR; R6	BAR; R7	BAR; R8	HDV; R9	HDV; R10	HDV; R11	QLD; R12	ORA; R13	SAN; R14	BAT; R15; Ret	SUR; R16	SUR; R17	PUK; R18	PUK; R19	PUK; R20	EAS; R21	EAS; R22																NC	0
2010	Jack Daniels Racing	15	Holden VE Commodore	YMC; R1	YMC; R2	BHR; R3	BHR; R4	ADE; R5	ADE; R6	HAM; R7	HAM; R8	QLD; R9; PO	QLD; R10; PO	WIN; R11; PO	WIN; R12; PO	HDV; R13	HDV; R14	TOW; R15	TOW; R16	PHI; Q	PHI; R17	BAT; R18	SUR; R19	SUR; R20	SYM; R21	SYM; R22	SAN; R23	SAN; R24	SYD; R25	SYD; R26											NC	0
2012	Tekno Autosports	91	Holden VE Commodore	ADE; R1	ADE; R2	SYM; R3	SYM; R4	HAM; R5	HAM; R6	PER; R7	PER; R8	PER; R9	PHI; R10; PO	PHI; R11; PO	HDV; R12	HDV; R13	TOW; R14; PO	TOW; R15; PO	QLD; R16; PO	QLD; R17; PO	SMP; R18	SMP; R19	SAN; Q 25	SAN; R20; Ret	BAT; R21; Ret	SUR; R22	SUR; R23	YMC; R24	YMC; R25	WIN; R26	WIN; R27	SYD; R28	SYD; R29								58th	21
2013	Dick Johnson Racing	12	Ford FG Falcon	ADE; R1; Ret	ADE; R2; Ret	SYM; R3; 24	SYM; R4; 25	SYM; R5; 20	PUK; R6; 23	PUK; R7; 22	PUK; R8; 18	PUK; R9; 25	BAR; R10	BAR; R11	BAR; R12	COTA; R13	COTA; R14	COTA; R15	COTA; R16	HID; R17	HID; R18	HID; R19	TOW; R20	TOW; R21																	37th	449
2013	Tony D'Alberto Racing	3	Holden VF Commodore																						QLD; R22; PO	QLD; R23; PO	QLD; R24; PO	WIN; R25; PO	WIN; R26; PO	WIN; R27; PO	SAN; Q Ret	SAN; R28; 23	BAT; R29; 24	SUR; R30; 4	SUR; R31; 21	PHI; R32	PHI; R33	PHI; R34	SYD; R35	SYD; R36	37th	449

=== Complete Bathurst 1000 results ===
Year	Team	Car	Co-driver	Position	Laps
2003	Robert Smith Racing	Holden VX Commodore	(Australia) Alan Gurr	DNF	4
2012	Tekno Autosports	Holden VE Commodore	(Australia) Michael Patrizi	DNF	19
2013	Tony D'Alberto Racing	Holden VF Commodore	(Australia) Tony D'Alberto	24th	149

=== Complete Bathurst 12 Hour results ===
Year	Team	Co-drivers	Car	Class	Laps	Pos.	Class pos.
2013	(Australia) Hunter Sports Group	(Australia) Steven Johnson (Australia) Drew Russell	Porsche 997 GT3 Cup	B	257	9th	1st
2018	(New Zealand) International Motorsport	(New Zealand) Andrew Bagnall (New Zealand) Matt Halliday	Audi R8 LMS	APA	41	DNF	DNF

== Other career results ==
Season	Series	Position	Car	Team
2002–03	New Zealand Formula Ford Championship	1st	Stealth Van Diemen RF94 - Ford	
2003	Australian Drivers' Championship	2nd	Reynard 96D Holden	Ralt Australia
2005	Japanese Formula Three Championship	8th	Dome F107 - Toyota	Inging
2006	Japanese Formula Three Championship	8th	Dallara F306 - Toyota	Inging
2009–10	New Zealand Porsche GT3 Championship	2nd	Porsche 911 GT3 Cup	International Motorsport
2010–11	New Zealand Porsche GT3 Championship	3rd	Porsche 911 GT3 Cup	International Motorsport
2011	Australian Carrera Cup Championship	2nd	Porsche 911 GT3 Cup	McElrea Racing
2012	V8 SuperTourers Championship	5th	Ford FG Falcon	International Motorsport
2012	Australian Carrera Cup Championship	2nd	Porsche 911 GT3 Cup	Hunter Sports Group
2013	V8 SuperTourers Championship	30th	Holden VE Commodore	Team 4

Sporting positions
Preceded by Fabian Coulthard	Winner of the New Zealand Grand Prix; 2003	Succeeded by Ken Smith
