= 2012 Australian Carrera Cup Championship =

Australian motor racing competition

Seasons
- ← 2011 2013 →

The 2012 Porsche City Index Australian Carrera Cup Championship was an Australian motor racing competition for Porsche 911 GT3 Cup cars. It was sanctioned by the Confederation of Australian Motor Sport (CAMS) as a National Championship, and was recognised by them as the eighth Australian Carrera Cup Championship. Porsche Cars Australia Pty Ltd was appointed as the Category Manager by CAMS for the Championship.

The championship was won by Craig Baird.

== Teams and drivers ==
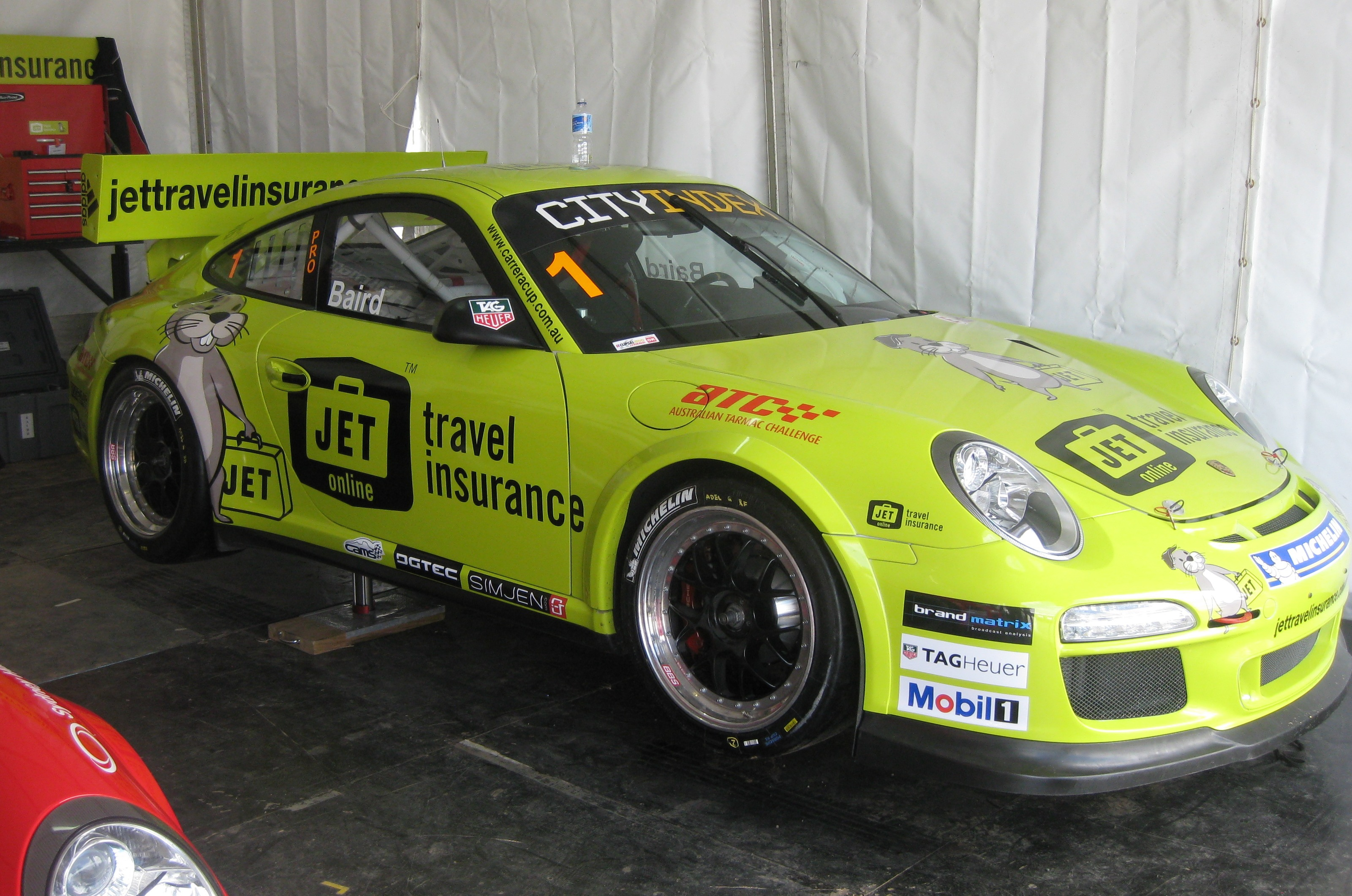
Craig Baird won the championship in the Jet Travel Insurance entry

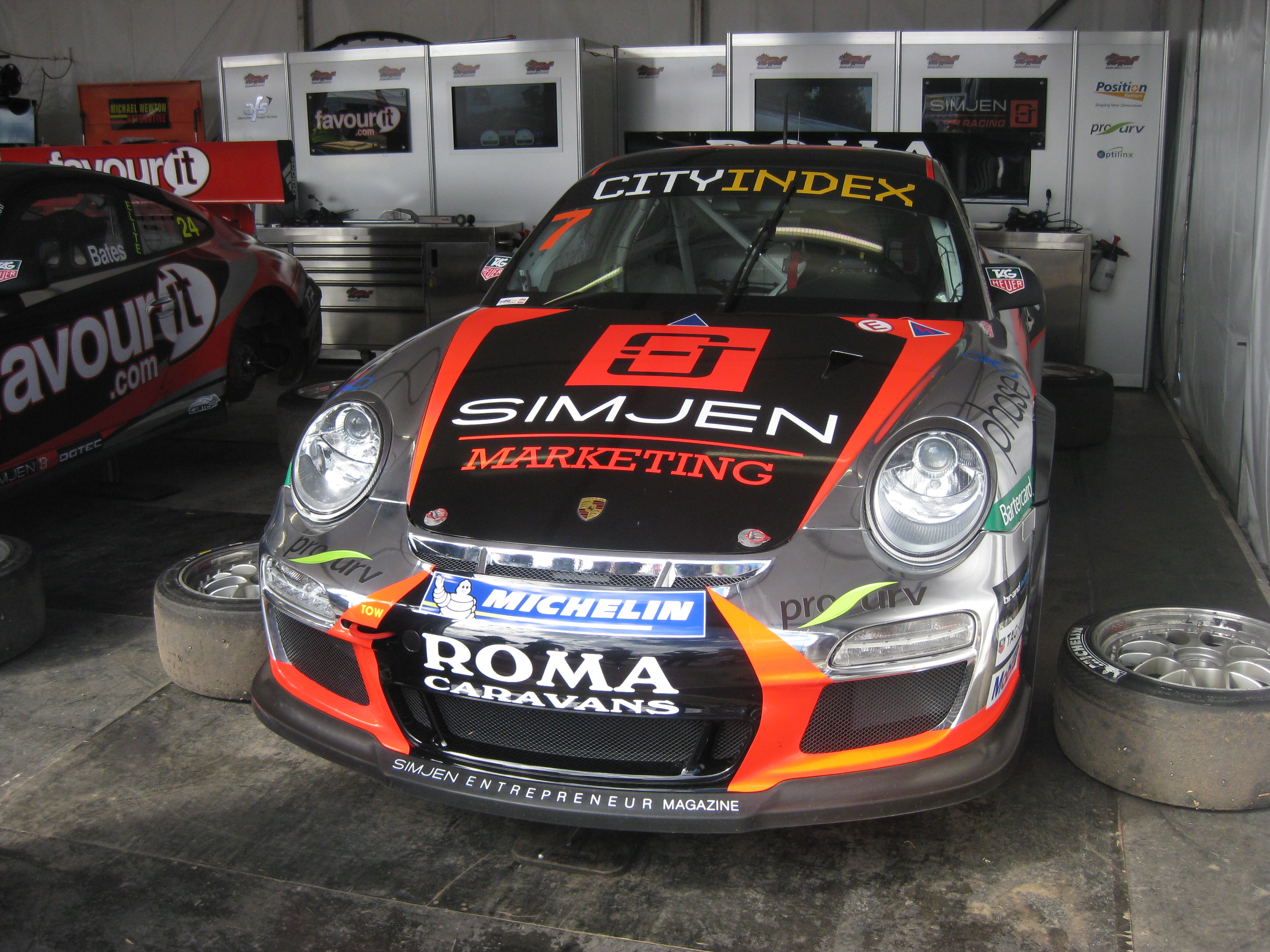
Alex Davison placed third in the Roma Caravans entry

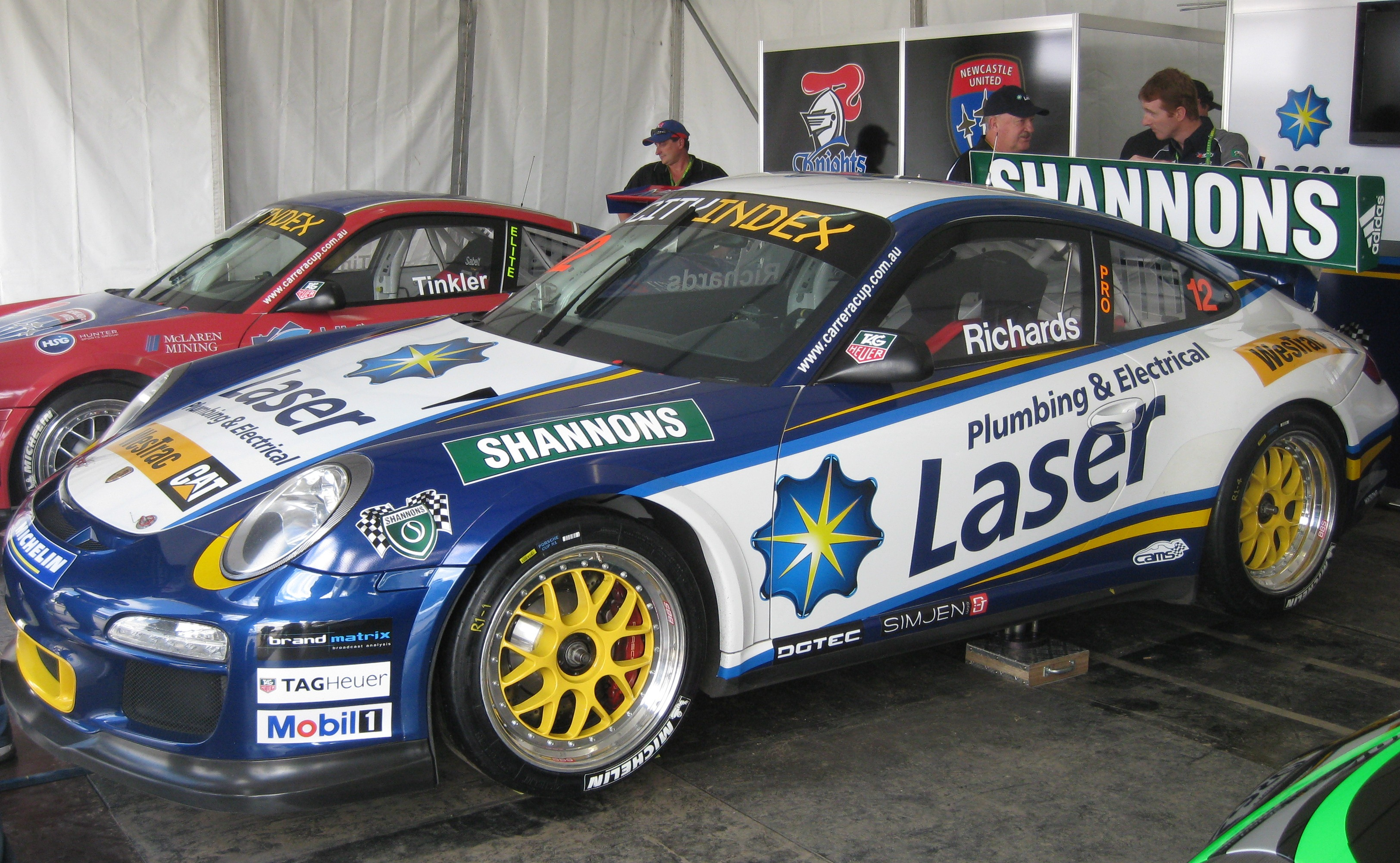
Steven Richards placed fifth in the Laser Plumbing & Electrical entry

The following teams and drivers contested the championship.

Team	No.	Driver	Class	Rounds
Alliance Group Racing	1	(New Zealand) Craig Baird	Pro	All
Grove Group	4	(Australia) Stephen Grove	Elite	5, 7–8
Hunter Sports Group	5	(New Zealand) Jonny Reid	Pro	2–8
Hunter Sports Group	5	(Australia) Nathan Tinkler	Elite	1
Hunter Sports Group	18	(Australia) Nathan Tinkler	Elite	4
Hunter Sports Group	96	(New Zealand) Ant Pedersen	Pro	6
McElrea Racing	7	(Australia) Alex Davison	Pro	All
McElrea Racing	24	(Australia) Tony Bates	Elite	1–4, 6–8
McElrea Racing	24	(Australia) Tim Leahey	Guest	5
McElrea Racing	29	(Australia) James Davison	Pro	2
Twigg Motorsport	8	(Australia) Max Twigg	Elite	1–2, 4–8
Hallmarc Racing	9	(Australia) Marc Cini	Elite	All
Hallmarc Racing	10	(Australia) Michael Loccissano	Elite	2–8
Team BRM	11	(Australia) Nick Foster	Pro	All
Team BRM	20	(Australia) Tom Tweedie	Pro	1–5
Team BRM	20	(Australia) Troy Wilson	Pro	6
Team BRM	20	(Australia) Morgan Mutch	Pro	7
Team BRM	20	(Australia) Michael Almond	Pro	8
Laser Racing	12	(New Zealand) Steven Richards	Pro	All
INCA Motorsports	17	(Australia) Ray Angus	Elite	2, 5–8
INCA Motorsports	50	(Australia) Matt Kingsley	Pro	1, 4
INCA Motorsports	50	(Australia) Matt Kingsley	Guest	5
Team Kiwi Racing	21	(New Zealand) Andre Heimgartner	Pro	All
Porsche Cars Australia	22	(Australia) Mark Skaife	Pro	2
Porsche Cars Australia	40	(Australia) Max Twigg	Elite	3
Porsche Cars Australia	40	(Australia) Jeff Bobik	Pro	4
Porsche Cars Australia	60	(Germany) Heinz-Harald Frentzen	Guest	2
Porsche Cars Australia	60	(Netherlands) Jeroen Bleekemolen	Guest	6
Porsche Cars Australia	88	(Australia) Shae Davies	Pro	7–8
Porsche Cars Australia	96	(Switzerland) Alexandre Imperatori	Guest	8
Rusty French Racing	27	(New Zealand) Daniel Gaunt	Pro	All
Supabarn Motorsport	47	(Australia) James Koundouris	Elite	1–4, 6–8
Hamilton Autohaus	56	(Australia) Shane Smollen	Elite	1–7
Racing Incident	66	(Australia) Peter Hill	Elite	2
Racing Incident	66	(Australia) Theo Koundouris	Elite	8
Brighton Speedshop	90	(New Zealand) Paul Kelly	Elite	1–4

Note: Only Porsche 911 GT3 Cup cars were eligible to compete in the championship.

== Race calendar ==
The championship was contested over an eight round series with each round decided over a number of races with a minimum total race time of one hour at each round.

Round	Circuit	Location / state	Date	Format	Winner
1	(South Australia) Adelaide Street Circuit	Adelaide, South Australia	1—4 March	Three races	Alex Davison
2	(Victoria (state)) Albert Park Grand Prix Circuit	Melbourne, Victoria	15—18 March	Three races	Craig Baird
3	(Western Australia) Barbagallo Raceway	Perth, Western Australia	4—6 May	Three races	Jonny Reid
4	(Victoria (state)) Phillip Island Grand Prix Circuit	Phillip Island, Victoria	18—20 May	Three races	Craig Baird
5	(Queensland) Townsville Street Circuit	Townsville, Queensland	6—8 July	Three races	Jonny Reid
6	(New South Wales) Mount Panorama Circuit	Bathurst, New South Wales	4—7 October	Three races	Craig Baird
7	(Queensland) Surfers Paradise Street Circuit	Surfers Paradise, Queensland	19—21 October	Three races	Jonny Reid
8	(New South Wales) Homebush Street Circuit	Sydney, New South Wales	30 November—2 December	Three races	Jonny Reid

== Championship summary ==
Round 1 in Adelaide was won by returning 2004 Champion Alex Davison from defending champion Craig Baird with Daniel Gaunt third. The elite class was won by James Koundouris.

Round 2 was held as a support race to the Australian Grand Prix at the Albert Park Grand Prix Circuit. A classy field assembled including former Grand Prix winner Heinz-Harald Frentzen, former V8 Supercar Champion and Bathurst 1000 winner Mark Skaife, 2011 runner-up Jonny Reid and returning from racing sports cars in the USA, James Davison. But the regulars showed the way with Craig Baird winning all three races, followed by Reid, with round 1 winner Alex Davison third. The elite class was won by Max Twigg.

== Points system ==
Points were awarded to the first 25 finishers in each race as per the following table.

Position	1st	2nd	3rd	4th	5th	6th	7th	8th	9th	10th	11th	12th	13th	14th	15th	16th	17th	18th	19th	20th	21st	22nd	23rd	24th	25th
Points	60	54	48	42	36	32	29	26	23	20	18	16	14	12	11	10	9	8	7	6	5	4	3	2	1

In addition to competing for the outright championship, each driver was classified as either Professional or Elite and contested the relevant class title. Points were awarded for class places in each race on the same basis as for the outright championship.

== Championship standings ==
=== Outright ===
Pos	Driver	Ade			Alb			Bar			Phi			Tow			Bat			Sur			Hom			Pen.	Pts
1	(New Zealand) Craig Baird	7th	2nd	1st	1st	1st	1st	3rd	2nd	2nd	3rd	1st	3rd	3rd	2nd	3rd	1st	1st	1st	1st	1st	8th	2nd	2nd	3rd		1267
2	(New Zealand) Jonny Reid				2nd	2nd	2nd	2nd	1st	1st	Ret	4th	1st	2nd	1st	1st	2nd	3rd	6th	2nd	2nd	1st	1st	1st	1st		1104
3	(Australia) Alex Davison	1st	1st	2nd	3rd	3rd	3rd	1st	3rd	3rd	Ret	9th	2nd	1st	3rd	2nd	5th	4th	3rd	Ret	6th	3rd	6th	5th	4th	6	1041
4	(New Zealand) Daniel Gaunt	3rd	3rd	5th	10th	13th	12th	5th	5th	4th	1st	2nd	7th	4th	7th	5th	6th	6th	7th	4th	4th	6th	4th	3rd	2nd		920
5	(New Zealand) Steven Richards	Ret	Ret	4th	11th	6th	4th	6th	4th	6th	2nd	3rd	11th	5th	5th	4th	3rd	5th	5th	3rd	3rd	2nd	3rd	4th	6th		884
6	(Australia) Nick Foster	2nd	10th	10th	18th	10th	7th	4th	8th	5th	5th	5th	4th	6th	4th	14th	12th	7th	4th	Ret	Ret	5th	5th	6th	5th	60	641
7	(New Zealand) Andre Heimgartner	4th	4th	15th	9th	7th	5th	9th	6th	9th	4th	15th	6th	8th	8th	Ret	16th	17th	9th	5th	5th	4th	8th	Ret	10th		622
8	(Australia) Max Twigg	8th	8th	7th	6th	8th	9th	14th	10th	8th	6th	7th	9th	12th	12th	8th	9th	9th	12th	8th	8th	9th	11th	10th	8th		606
9	(Australia) James Koundouris	6th	7th	8th	8th	11th	10th	8th	9th	15th	7th	10th	Ret				10th	11th	10th	12th	9th	11th	10th	8th	9th		472
10	(Australia) Tony Bates	10th	9th	9th	14th	14th	17th	11th	11th	11th	9th	13th	14th				8th	12th	11th	Ret	10th	10th	17th	9th	12th		356
11	(Australia) Michael Loccisano				13th	16th	14th	12th	13th	13th	11th	14th	15th	14th	13th	11th	14th	15th	15th	11th	12th	13th	12th	15th	15th		315
12	(Australia) Tom Tweedie	5th	5th	6th	Ret	Ret	11th	7th	7th	7th	Ret	8th	8th	9th	10th	Ret											315
13	(Australia) Marc Cini	Ret	11th	11th	15th	17th	16th	Ret	15th	14th	12th	17th	13th	15th	14th	10th	13th	13th	13th	9th	Ret	16th	13th	11th	13th		312
14	(Australia) Shane Smollen	9th	12th	13th	Ret	DNS	DNS	10th	12th	10th	8th	16th	12th	10th	11th	12th	7th	18th	18th	7th	Ret	DNS					288
15	(Australia) Ray Angus				17th	DSQ	15th							13th	15th	9th	15th	14th	16th	13th	Ret	15th	15th	13th	16th		186
16	(New Zealand) Paul Kelly	12th	14th	12th	16th	15th	18th	13th	14th	12th	Ret	12th	Ret													10	178
17	(Australia) Matt Kingsley	Ret	6th	3rd							10th	6th	5th	7th	6th	6th											168
18	(Australia) Shae Davies																			8th	6th	7th	9th	16th	11th		147
19	(Australia) Stephen Grove													16th	16th	13th				14th	13th	14th	14th	14th	Ret		138
20	(Australia) James Davison				5th	5th	6th																				116
21	(Australia) Mark Skaife				7th	9th	Ret																				58
22	(New Zealand) Ant Pedersen																18th	8th	8th								58
23	(Australia) Nathan Tinkler	11th	13th	14th							Ret	Ret	16th														54
24	(Australia) Peter Hill				12th	12th	13th																				52
25	(Australia) Jeff Bobik										13th	11th	10th														52
26	(Australia) Theo Koundouris																						16th	12th	14th		45
27	(Australia) Troy Wilson																11th	10th	14th								42
28	(Australia) Michael Almond																						Ret	DNS	DNS		0
29	(Australia) Morgan Mutch																			Ret	Ret	Ret					0
Guest drivers ineligible for points
	(Netherlands) Jeroen Bleekemolen																4th	2nd	2nd								0
	(Germany) Heinz-Harald Frentzen				4th	4th	8th																				0
	(Switzerland) Alexandre Imperatori																						7th	7th	7th		0
	(Australia) Tim Leahey													11th	9th	7th											0
Pos	Driver	Ade			Alb			Bar			Phi			Tow			Bat			Sur			Hom			Pen.	Pts

Colour	Result
Gold	Winner
Silver	Second place
Bronze	Third place
Green	Points classification
Blue	Non-points classification
Blue	Non-classified finish (NC)
Purple	Retired, not classified (Ret)
Red	Did not qualify (DNQ)
Red	Did not pre-qualify (DNPQ)
Black	Disqualified (DSQ)
White	Did not start (DNS)
White	Withdrew (WD)
White	Race cancelled (C)
Blank	Did not practice (DNP)
Blank	Did not arrive (DNA)
Blank	Excluded (EX)

=== Professional Class ===
Craig Baird won the Professional Class pointscore from Jonny Reid and Alex Davison.

=== Elite Class ===
Max Twigg won the Elite Class from James Koundouris and Tony Bates.

== See also ==
- Australian Carrera Cup Championship
- Porsche Supercup
- Porsche 911 GT3
- Porsche 997
