= 2011 Australian Carrera Cup Championship =

Australian motor racing competition

Seasons
- ← 2008 2012 →

The 2011 Australian Carrera Cup Championship was a CAMS sanctioned motor racing title for drivers of Porsche 911 GT3 Cup cars. The championship, which was contested over seven rounds across four states, began on 24 March 2011 at the Australian Grand Prix and ended on 4 December at the Sydney 500. It was the seventh Australian Carrera Cup Championship.

After the opening round of the series, reigning champion Craig Baird led the championship having scored a second and two wins over the course of the 2011 Australian Grand Prix weekend. Baird was thirty points ahead of Daniel Gaunt and Steven Richards. The winner of the opening race of the season, Jonny Reid slipped to sixth place in the points after a disappointing race when the car slowed on the final lap of the race. An all-podium performance at the second round of the championship by Richards elevated him into the points lead while Reid began a run of six consecutive races of top two race positions to take the championship lead after the third round, a round which had been dominated by Daniel Gaunt with three wins at the Townsville 400 weekend.

New Zealand driver Jonny Reid led the series after three rounds with a narrow four point gap over countryman Craig Baird. Steven Richards sat 41 points behind Reid who in turn was just two point ahead of Daniel Gaunt. Reid had won three races over the season thus far, as had Gaunt with Baird having won twice and Richards once.

== Teams and drivers ==
The following teams and drivers contested the championship.

Team	No	Driver
Dutton Insurance Racing	1	(New Zealand) Craig Baird
Tinkler Motorsport	5	(Australia) Nathan Tinkler (Australia) Jeremy Gray
Skye Sands	6	(Australia) Rusty French
McElrea Racing	7	(New Zealand) Jonny Reid
McElrea Racing	29	(Australia) Michael Patrizi
Twigg Motorsport	8	(Australia) Max Twigg
Hallmarc Racing	9	(Australia) Marc Cini
Hallmarc Racing	10	(Australia) Michael Loccisano
Money Choice Motorsport	11	(Australia) Matthew Coleman
Jim Richards Racing	12	(New Zealand) Steven Richards
INCA Motorsports	17	(Australia) Ray Angus
Andrew Barlow Motorsport	18	(Australia) Andrew Barlow
Nexus Racing	19	(Australia) Damien Flack
Team BRM	20	(United Kingdom) Ben Barker
Triple X Motorsport; Melbourne Performance Centre	27	(New Zealand) Daniel Gaunt
Supabarn Motorsport	47	(Australia) Theo Koundouris
Supabarn Motorsport	69	(Australia) James Koundouris
Jocaro Motorsport	51	(Australia) Ross Lilley
Smollen Motorsport	56	(Australia) Shane Smollen
Porsche Cars Australia	60	(Australia) Mark Noske (Australia) Mark Skaife (Australia) Nick Foster
Racing Incident	66	(Australia) Peter Hill (Australia) Tim Leahey
01 Motorsport	88	(Australia) Simon Middleton
Paul Kelly Motor Group	90	(New Zealand) Paul Kelly

== Race calendar ==
Round	Date	Circuit	Location	Winning driver
1	24–27 March	(Victoria (state)) Albert Park Street Circuit	Melbourne, Victoria	Craig Baird
2	30 April–1 May	(Western Australia) Barbagallo Raceway	Perth, Western Australia	Jonny Reid
3	8–10 July	(Queensland) Townsville Street Circuit	Townsville, Queensland	Daniel Gaunt
4	16–18 September	(Victoria (state)) Phillip Island Grand Prix Circuit	Phillip Island, Victoria	Daniel Gaunt
5	6–9 October	(New South Wales) Mount Panorama Circuit	Bathurst, New South Wales	Michael Patrizi
6	21–23 October	(Queensland) Surfers Paradise Street Circuit	Surfers Paradise, Queensland	Craig Baird
7	2–4 December	(New South Wales) Homebush Street Circuit	Sydney, New South Wales	Jonny Reid

Each of the seven rounds was contested over three races.

== Points system ==
Championship points were awarded on a 60–54–48–42–36–32–29–26–23–20–18–16–14–12–11–10–9–8–7–6–5–4–3–2–1 basis to the first twenty-five finishers in each race.

== Results and standings ==
=== Drivers' championship ===
Pos.	Driver	ALB			BAR			TOW			PHI			BAT			SUR			HOM			Pen.	Pts.
1	(New Zealand) Craig Baird	2	1	1	4	2	6	4	3	4	2	1	11	4	4	1	1	1	1	2	6	Ret		980
2	(New Zealand) Jonny Reid	1	6	16	2	1	1	2	2	2	3	3	2	13	6	2	3	Ret	5	3	2	2	15	918
3	(New Zealand) Daniel Gaunt	5	2	2	Ret	7	4	1	1	1	1	2	1	5	5	5	2	2	3	4	12	Ret		884
4	(New Zealand) Steven Richards	3	3	3	1	3	2	6	9	5	5	4	4	2	3	3	7	4	2	Ret	4	3		882
5	(United Kingdom) Ben Barker	6	4	8	13	5	3	5	5	6	4	5	5	3	2	8	5	3	Ret	1	1	Ret		755
6	(Australia) Michael Patrizi	Ret	9	8	3	4	5	3	4	3	Ret	8	3	1	1	4	4	Ret	Ret	5	3	1		754
7	(Australia) Max Twigg	7	7	6	5	8	17	7	7	10	6	7	6	8	9	10	Ret	7	6	7	7	5		581
8	(Australia) Matthew Coleman	9	8	7	6	6	7	8	8	8	7	11	7	6	8	6	6	8	4	Ret	17	DNS		534
9	(Australia) James Koundouris	10	Ret	10	7	10	9	11	14	12	9	10	12	11	11	Ret	8	13	7	9	9	13		400
10	(New Zealand) Paul Kelly				8	9	8	12	11	14	10	14	9	15	14	11	9	5	12	8	11	10		366
11	(Australia) Theo Koundouris	11	11	9	9	11	10	10	10	11							13	6	8	10	8	8		340
12	(Australia) Damien Flack	12	19	12				9	6	7	8	6	8	10	10	Ret	10	Ret	DNS					272
13	(Australia) Marc Cini	14	18	Ret	14	16	13	13	13	13	15	19	Ret	16	15	14	14	11	9	11	Ret	9		255
14	(Australia) Simon Middleton	16	14	14				14	21	17	14	12	13	14	13	12	16	10	13	13	10	11		254
15	(Australia) Michael Loccisano	13	13	15	DNS	19	16	18	16	18	18	16	16	18	18	17	15	9	Ret	16	13	6		239
16	(Australia) Shane Smollen	15	12	13	12	13	19	Ret	15	Ret	11	18	15	12	12	9	12	15	11					232
17	(Australia) Ross Lilley	17	16	17	15	18	18	16	17	16	16	13	18	17	16	16	18	14	15	15	16	14		218
18	(Australia) Peter Hill	8	10	11	10	14	11				13	15	14				11	Ret	10					197
19	(Australia) Ray Angus	19	17	21	16	15	14	17	21	Ret				Ret	17	15	17	12	14	14	15	12		174
20	(Australia) Jeremy Gray										12	9	10	9	Ret	13				12	14	7		160
21	(Australia) Andrew Barlow	18	15	18	11	12	12	15	Ret	15														103
22	(Australia) Rusty French	20	20	19	17	17	20	19	19	19	17	17	17											96
23	(Australia) Tim Leahey													7	7	7								87
24	(Australia) Nathan Tinkler	21	21	20	18	20	15	20	18	20														66
Guest drivers ineligible for points
	(Australia) Mark Skaife	4	5	4																				0
	(Australia) Nick Foster																			6	5	4		0
	(Australia) Mark Noske							Ret	12	9														0

Colour	Result
Gold	Winner
Silver	Second place
Bronze	Third place
Green	Points classification
Blue	Non-points classification
Blue	Non-classified finish (NC)
Purple	Retired, not classified (Ret)
Red	Did not qualify (DNQ)
Red	Did not pre-qualify (DNPQ)
Black	Disqualified (DSQ)
White	Did not start (DNS)
White	Withdrew (WD)
White	Race cancelled (C)
Blank	Did not practice (DNP)
Blank	Did not arrive (DNA)
Blank	Excluded (EX)

=== Professional Class ===
The Professional Class was won by Craig Baird from Jonny Reid and Daniel Gaunt.

=== Elite Class ===
The Elite Class was won by Max Twigg from Paul Kelly and James Koundouris.

== See also ==
- Australian Carrera Cup Championship
- Porsche Supercup
- Porsche 911 GT3
- Porsche 997
