= Alex Yoong =

Malaysian racing driver (born 1976)

- 熊龙
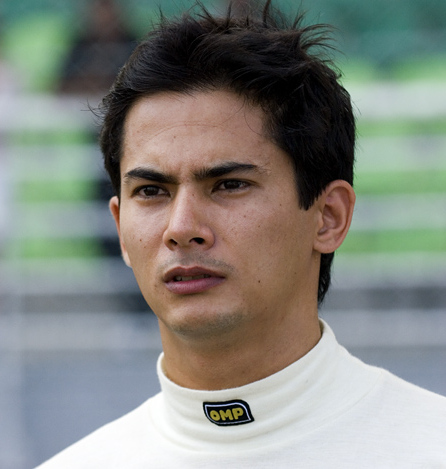
- Yoong in 2006
- Born: Alexander Charles Yoong Loong; 20 July 1976 (age 50); Kuala Lumpur, Malaysia
- Spouse: Arriana Teoh (m. 2002)
- Children: 1

Formula One World Championship career
- Nationality: (Malaysia) Malaysian
- Active years: 2001–2002
- Team: Minardi
- Entries: 18 (14 starts)
- Championships: 0
- Wins: 0
- Podiums: 0
- Career points: 0
- Pole positions: 0
- Fastest laps: 0
- First entry: 2001 Italian Grand Prix
- Last entry: 2002 Japanese Grand Prix

24 Hours of Le Mans career
- Years: 2006–2007
- Teams: RfH, Charouz
- Best finish: 8th (2006)
- Class wins: 0

Championship titles
- 2014, 2015, 2016: Audi R8 LMS Cup

Chinese name
- Traditional Chinese: 熊龍
- Simplified Chinese: 熊龙
Transcriptions
Standard Mandarin
- Hanyu Pinyin: Xióng Lóng
Hakka
- Romanization: Yung^{2} Lung^{2}
- Pha̍k-fa-sṳ: Yùng Lùng
Yue: Cantonese
- Jyutping: Hung^{4} Lung^{4}
Southern Min
- Hokkien POJ: Hîm Liông
- Tâi-lô: Hîm Liông

Alexander Charles Yoong Loong (Chinese: 熊龙; pinyin: Xióng Lóng; born 20 July 1976) is a Malaysian racing driver and broadcaster, who competed in Formula One in 18 Grands Prix from 2001 to 2002. Yoong remains the only Malaysian driver to compete in Formula One.

Born in Kuala Lumpur to a Malaysian Chinese father and English mother, Yoong began his career in saloon cars before moving into the Proton one-make series. He later raced in single-seater cars where he won the Malaysian Championship in 1995. He moved into Formula Renault in 1996 with help from sponsors but finished outside the top-10. Yoong consulted his father, who believed his son would succeed in lower categories. Yoong decided to drive in Formula Three but dropped out in 1999 after withdrawal from his sponsors. He subsequently went into Formula 3000 and managed to improve despite a horrific crash at Spa-Francorchamps during the season. Yoong also raced in Formula Nippon where he achieved no success.

Yoong became the first and, as of 2025, only Malaysian to race in Formula One with Minardi at the 2001 Italian Grand Prix and left the sport in 2002. Yoong had a less successful career in CART World Series but had improved in the Porsche Carrera Cup with a less successful foray into V8 Supercars. Yoong raced in A1 Grand Prix series between 2005 and 2008 and scored three victories. In between this, Yoong raced in the Le Mans 24 Hours. Yoong worked for Lotus Racing as head of driver development and is also a commentator for Fox Sports Asia.

== Early life ==
Yoong was born on 20 July 1976 at the Sambhi Clinic in Kuala Lumpur. His mother, Johanna Bean, is English, and his father Hanifah Yoong Yin Fah is a Malaysian of Chinese descent through Alex's grandfather Yoong Wan Hoi who emigrated in 1933. His grandfather worked as a contractor and steel trader but was forced to retire during the 1997 Asian financial crisis. In an interview in 1999, Yoong states that he sees himself first as a Malaysian, then part Chinese and part English. His father started racing sedans in 1978, and his mother followed suit in 1983 in rallying. Yoong became an avid follower of Formula One by the age of four. He cited Nelson Piquet and Ayrton Senna as his racing heroes. With a Kawasaki 50cc motocross bike he got on his eighth birthday, Yoong first showed his talent at racing.

== Early career ==
Yoong's early racing career started in saloon cars in 1992 when he was 16. Yoong became the youngest driver in Malaysian motorsport history and moved into a one-make Proton series. He secured his first pole and won in his fourth role and ended up winning two out of five races. In late 1992, Yoong took up saloon racing and took a Toyota Corolla to the Macau Grand Prix and finished third in the 1600cc class in the Guia Race. Yoong later moved up into a 400-horsepower DTM-spec BMW and was the most powerful saloon in the region.

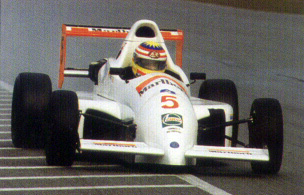
Yoong racing in Formula Asia 2000 in Zhuhai

Moving up into the Formula Asia International Championship in 1994 with a RM 50,000 loan, Yoong took several podium finishes before claiming his first win in the season-ending round at Zhuhai in China. This result led to Yoong to go a title challenge in 1995. He had won the Malaysian national crown, but the Continental Championship campaign was far less successful; producing eight wins and finishing second in the championship missing out by two points. Within the same year, Yoong assisted in the filming of Jackie Chan's racing film Thunderbolt at Shah Alam which led to Chan describing him as a "very good racing driver". Yoong was contacted by Paul Stewart to test a Formula Vauxhall car before he gained the opportunity to test a Formula Renault Sport machine at Donington Park and Snetterton for the Startline Racing team.

=== Formula Renault ===
Yoong began a campaign in Formula Renault with Startline Racing in 1996 along with sponsorship from Malaysian tyre manufacturer, Silverstone tyres. At the first round in Donington, on lap one, Yoong outbraked three cars entering the Melbourne hairpin with his four tyres locking up, and by the fifth lap, Yoong was in sixth but an eventual collision with Rollo McNally but managed to finish 20th. Throughout the rest of the season, Yoong managed to score numerous top six finishes but was unable to win a race. Going into 1997, Yoong remained with Startline and believed he had a chance of competing for race wins. But inexperience shown by a crash at the fourth round at Donington along with an uncompetitive chassis saw Yoong finish outside the top 10 of the championship.

=== Formula Three ===
Yoong consulted with his father Hanifah, and believed the best chance was to go into lower categories. However, he decided to go into Formula Three to convince himself that he was a skilled driver. He joined Portman Racing Team in their Dallara HKS-Mitsubishi. Joining them at Spa, Yoong finished 16th in a field of thirty cars and came 11th at the next round at Silverstone.

During the off-season, Yoong took up mental and physical training with psychologists at the Bukit Jalil Sports Complex back in Malaysia. The training gave Yoong confidence when arriving back in England in 1998. Remaining with Portman Racing, the team was using Renault engines for their Dallara F397 and F398 chassis. Consistency brought Yoong results in the lower half of the top-ten, which included two sixth places at Silverstone. Going into the round at Spa, Yoong switched to Alan Docking Racing. He had to adjust to the Mugen-Honda engine and came up with results very similar to Portman Racing.

1999 proved to be a watershed year. Yoong's sponsors dropped out, and his father was forced to fund his son's racing activities until the family became indebted. He missed the first two rounds of the year but made a strong comeback when he returned at Thruxton. Driving a Dallara F399 Mugen Honda, Yoong finished sixth, 11 seconds behind winner Jenson Button. He followed this strong finish with fifth at Brands Hatch, in a race that covered the top seven by 3.4 seconds. The second race at Brands Hatch saw Yoong record a second-place behind Narain Karthikeyan, which was followed up with another sixth at Oulton Park before leaving the series for Formula 3000. This result confirmed, Yoong moved up from 268th to 214th in the world rankings. Overall, Yoong finished 11th in the championship.

=== Formula 3000 ===
Yoong joined the Italian F3000 championship from the third round onwards. During his time with Monaco Motorsports, a team run by ex-Formula One driver Lamberto Leoni, he was a team-mate to Marco Apicella. On Yoong's debut at Enna Pergusa, he qualified 12th. He finished fifth.

At the next round at Donington, Yoong ended up starting fifth and drove arguably the best race of his career. During the race that caused unpredictable conditions and other competitors spinning out, Yoong ended up second at the midpoint, two seconds behind leader Werner Lupberger. The pair pulled out a 22-second gap over the entire field. With the deployment of the safety car to clear several cars who had retired, Yoong was unable to see the safety car's lights in the spray. This mistake costed him eight seconds behind Lupberger, but Yoong set five consecutive fastest laps to catch up. Later in the race, while he was in fifth gear at 220 km/h, he aquaplaned and spun after hitting a puddle. But, Yoong miraculously recovered and once again closed on Lupberger. In the end, he finished second, 1.217s behind Lupberger.

Despite this brilliant result, Yoong was unable to qualify in Austria, Germany, or Hungary. In Belgium, having qualified 16th and up into 11th by the fifth lap, he collided with Justin Wilson's Astromega car going into Eau Rouge. Yoong lost control and hurtled left side first into the tyre barrier at 260 km/h with an impact of around 6.5G. He was knocked unconscious for 20 minutes. He was treated by Sid Watkins and the FIA medical team on the scene. They discovered that Yoong's helmet was badly damaged but was still intact. After 10 minutes, he was freed and taken to the track medical centre before he was taken by helicopter to the Liège hospital for a complete body and brain scan. Yoong was cleared by doctors of any neurological or spinal injuries but was kept for observation. Yoong managed to attend the race at Misano but needing crutches to walk and declared himself 80% fit and qualifiedth before being rammed off the track by Krisitan Kolby. Several laps later, his brakes failed at Tosa and pitched him into the gravel. He finished in 10th in the Drivers' Championship with eight points.

The end-of-the-season Formula Three 1999 race was hosted in Macau. Yoong went from 23rd on his way to ninth in the first heat before a 12th-place finish in the second to finish seventh overall.

In the Korean Formula Three Grand Prix at Changwon, an altercation with a backmarker placed Yoong out in the first race, but the second heat saw a late-race charge from the back to snatch 10th on the final lap but was not classified overall because of this first heat retirement.

=== Formula Nippon ===
2000

During the off-season, Yoong tested for both the Nakajima and Le Mans Formula Nippon teams. His first trial at Suzuka took place on 8–9 December 1999 attended by ex-Formula One driver Satoru Nakajima after Yoong set a lap that made him fifth fastest out of 12. Nakajima said of Yoong "Alex is very much better than I originally thought". Yoong spent time at the Bukit Jalil institute with psychologist Michel Gagne and trainer Jorg Teichmann to recuperate from his injuries at Spa the previous year. His Formula Nippon career started disastrously at Suzuka after crashing his Reynard 99L Mugen at 250 km/h at the daunting 130R in qualifying and forced Yoong to miss the race. At Motegi, a mechanical failure stalled his car at the start at Mine after starting seventh, where he went on to cause a multi-car pile-up in desperation to climb back up the field. Yoong's team manager, K. Homma told him he needs to calm down and finish races, and his father Hanifah encouraged him to take off the pressure.

Yoong returned to Malaysia for the annual Merdeka Millennium Endurance sports car race at Sepang and shared a TVR Chimaera to second place with Adam Lokman and Saladin Mazlan. He was able to race to sponsors TVR Malaysia, RentakAsia, and DiGi Telecommunications.

2001

At Motegi, Yoong lost 6 places at the start after a multi-car accident and was called in for an early pitstop. He made a mistake on lap 14 and retired.

== Formula One ==
=== Minardi ===
Yoong was visited by Minardi Sporting Director Rupert Manwaring during a visit to Malaysia to meet with potential backers for a Formula One seat. Manwaring offered him a seat, possibly as early as the British Grand Prix. By 5 July, Yoong had obtained sponsorship money from the government-backed Magnum Corporation, which was speculated by the Singapore Straits Times to be worth $5 million. The real figure was never publicly disclosed. He attended a two-day test at Mugello, becoming the first Malaysian to test a Formula One car with the FIA granting him his Super Licence.

==== 2001 ====
Yoong made his Formula One debut at the Italian Grand Prix, replacing Tarso Marques. Marques brought no money to the team and had been employed under the provision that another driver with more sponsorship money could replace him at any point in the season. Yoong secured backing from the Malaysian government-controlled lottery company Magnum, and made a deal with Minardi for the last three races of the 2001 season. During Friday practice at Monza, electrical problems limited Yoong's running and gearbox trouble cut short Saturday free practice. During qualifying, he did not complete a flying lap with more gearbox problems and had to share the spare car with teammate Fernando Alonso. Yoong retired from the race whilst running 15th. At Indianapolis, Yoong retired after 38 laps due to a gearbox failure. At Suzuka, a track he knew well, Yoong finished in 16th, three laps down.

==== 2002 ====
For 2002, Alonso left the team, and Australian Mark Webber became Yoong's new teammate. During the first race in Australia, he was beset by gearbox problems in free practice and spun twice when caught out by a wet track. Yoong qualified 21st ahead of Takuma Sato. During the race, he was up into ninth by the end of the first lap. Yoong was racing as high as fifth after passing David Coulthard for sixth. He eventually finished seventh after being passed by Mika Salo. This result was Yoong's best-placed finish in Formula One. At his home race in Malaysia, he outpaced Eddie Irvine's Jaguar during Friday Practice. Yoong qualified 22nd and at the start of the race, he overtook his teammate Webber at the first segment of the race. His refuelling rig malfunctioned at his first pit stop costing him time and lost a place to Irvine. Yoong retired after a collision with Irvine. In Brazil, Yoong finished 13th despite spinning and called it the toughest race he had ever done. At San Marino, he qualified 0.474s outside the 107% rule and failed to qualify. Yoong and Webber did not race in Spain after several rear and front wing failures for both drivers throughout practice and qualifying. In Austria, Yoong set a time over 4.2s slower than the pole-sitter. During the race, he spun in front of Ralf Schumacher before the Williams lapped him. Yoong retired with an engine failure.

"Ironically, my entry into F1 did very little to promote motorsports in the country. Malaysia had a very limited motorsports scene back then and the focus completely disappeared from local events. We needed more Grade-II circuits, which were missing"

— Alex Yoong, during an interview before the 2011 Indian Grand Prix, admitting his foray in Formula One did not influence drivers in Malaysia

At Monaco, Yoong participated in the Historic Grand Prix of Monaco before the actual event. He drove a Lotus 72 that was driven by Ronnie Peterson. He led until a safety car intervention when Yoong discovered his car was stuck in fifth gear and was forced to drive in this manner until the end of the race. During the actual Grand Prix weekend, Yoong sustained an accident during Thursday practice followed by a similar incident in qualifying when, on his first flying lap, he slid into the Ste Devote barrier. The race saw Yoong retire after running over debris on the approach to Massanet and sidewalled the armco to sustain damage his right rear track rod. In Canada, he finished 14th despite a drink bottle button not being able to function and gained a penalty for speeding in the pit lane. At the Nürburgring, Yoong declared the track "a bit of a go-kart circuit" as he disliked the layout. A second drive-through penalty was gained after he moved as the fifth red light came on at the start. At Silverstone, he failed to make the 107% cut during qualifying whilst a tenth-place finish followed up at Magny-Cours despite a spin. At the German Grand Prix, Yoong failed to qualify, having missed the 107% cut by 0.2s.

Rumors spread that Yoong was to be replaced by either Alonso, who was Renault's test driver, or Bryan Herta and Justin Wilson. Minardi eventually settled for Anthony Davidson to compete in the Hungarian and Belgium Grand Prix to allow Yoong for preparation for the final three rounds of the season. During this period, Yoong underwent a program in testing. Minardi later announced that Yoong would not drive for the team in 2003 but did not rule out any further involvement.

Yoong returned for the Italian Grand Prix. Despite an electronic problem at his pitstop, which cost him several minutes, Yoong finished ahead of Sato in 13th. In the United States, his form improved to qualify 20th with a time three seconds slower than Michael Schumacher, but during the race, Yoong suffered an engine failure. At the final race at Suzuka, he passed Webber on the first lap. On lap nine, Yoong spun into the gravel at turn two before retiring on Lap 14.

== After Formula One ==
After his Formula One career, Yoong initially struggled to remain visible in international motorsports. Soon after leaving Formula One, Yoong claimed that he was owed $200,000 in salary and that Paul Stoddart was threatening legal action against Yoong's sponsors for $1.5 million that was allegedly promised. Yoong later stated the deals were not related to his salary.

=== Champ Car ===
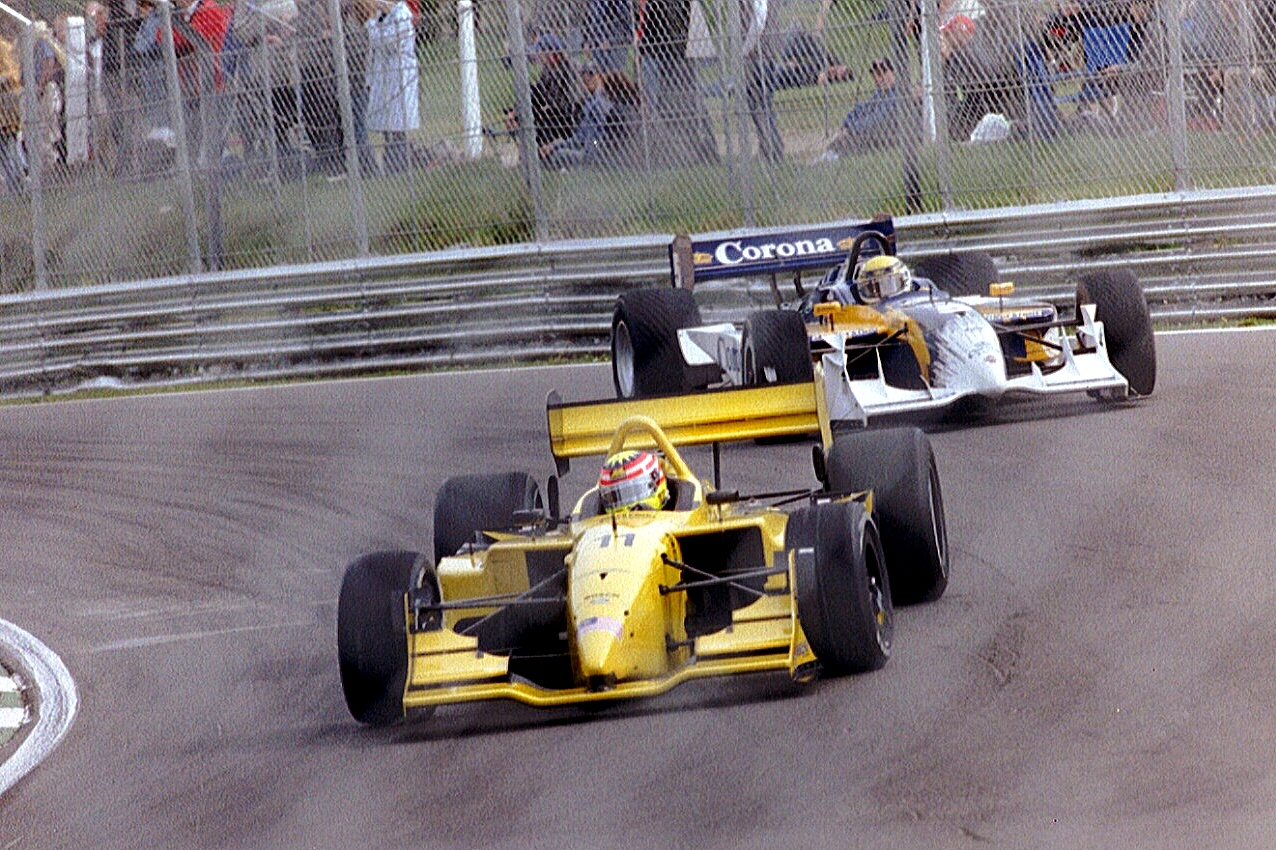
Yoong (in front) competing in a Champ Car race at Brands Hatch in 2003.

Yoong went into Champ Car to join Dale Coyne racing to partner Joel Camathias after Roberto González left due to a lack of sponsorship. His debut race at Mexico saw Yoong qualify 17th and finished ninth. Yoong was signed on a contract for the remainder of the season was signed after an impressive test session at the Arizona Motorsports Park gave the opportunity for more sponsorship to come forward. Despite this, Yoong qualified last at Long Beach and became the first retirement. At Brands Hatch, he qualified 13th but spun out. At the Lausitzring, Yoong again qualified in 13th and mechanical problems struck him before half-distance. By the end of May, sponsorship funding was not being received, forcing Yoong to leave Champ Car.

=== Porsche Carrera Cup Asia ===
Yoong found a drive in the Porsche Carrera Cup Asia after being invited to drive a guest car in a round supporting the Macau Formula Three Grand Prix. Driving a 2002-spec car, he overcame several brushes with the wall to qualify 3rd and swept past Charles Kwan and pole-sitter Matthew Marsh at the start of the race. Despite a gearbox issue, Yoong won the race by 1.186 seconds.

=== V8 Supercars ===
In the middle of 2003, Yoong was signed by the SAE Racing team to enter the Bathurst 24-hour production car event. He was team-mates with Luke Searle (the son of the owner David Searle), Alan Gurr and Geoff Full in a BMW 320i. A test session at Queensland Raceway in July showed the car was competitive. The drivers qualified 14th, but problems arose. During the qualifying, the BMW's engine had been losing power along with a failure of the fuel filter and the fuel injector jets were blocked. During the race, the issues were still present until 75 minutes before the race end, but the team did complete 50 laps. For 2004, Yoong was embarking in a career in the media for ESPN Star Sports as a Formula One presenter. By May of that year, support from Malaysian company Pan Global saw him drive in the V8 endurance events at Sandown and Bathurst.

For this to happen, Yoong signed with Shane Beikoff racing to compete in the final three rounds of the Konica Minolta series. Testing at Queensland Raceway gave Yoong his V8 Supercar debut in a Ford Falcon AU at Eastern Creek. After qualifying in 17th, he got into 13th at the start of the race but a collision with a fellow competitor saw Yoong drop two places. The damage caused the car to sit out for the rest of the weekend, but Yoong bounced back at Queensland Raceway to start ninth. The race was more eventful as he dropped to 25th and lapped after his car was stuck in fourth gear and an incident with Kevin Mundy on lap one meant he was unable to finish higher than tenth. The third race saw an 18th-place finish.

Yoong joined WPS Racing for the endurance races. Pairing up with New Zealand rookie John McIntyre, the entry struggled to 21st place in the 2004 Betta Electrical Sandown 500 having found themselves in the muddy run-off areas on multiple occasions – a fate also suffered by the team's second Ford Falcon BA. McIntyre was moved to said other car for the Bathurst 1000, leaving Yoong to partner with Neil McFadyen. In the only start at the Mount Panorama Circuit for the pair of them, they kept out of trouble and finished two laps down in 15th. Yoong was retained by Craig Gore's team for the single-driver event on the Gold Coast, where he retired from the first race and finished 23rd in the second. Yoong was replaced with Owen Kelly for the remaining rounds of the championship.

=== A1 Grand Prix ===
2005–06

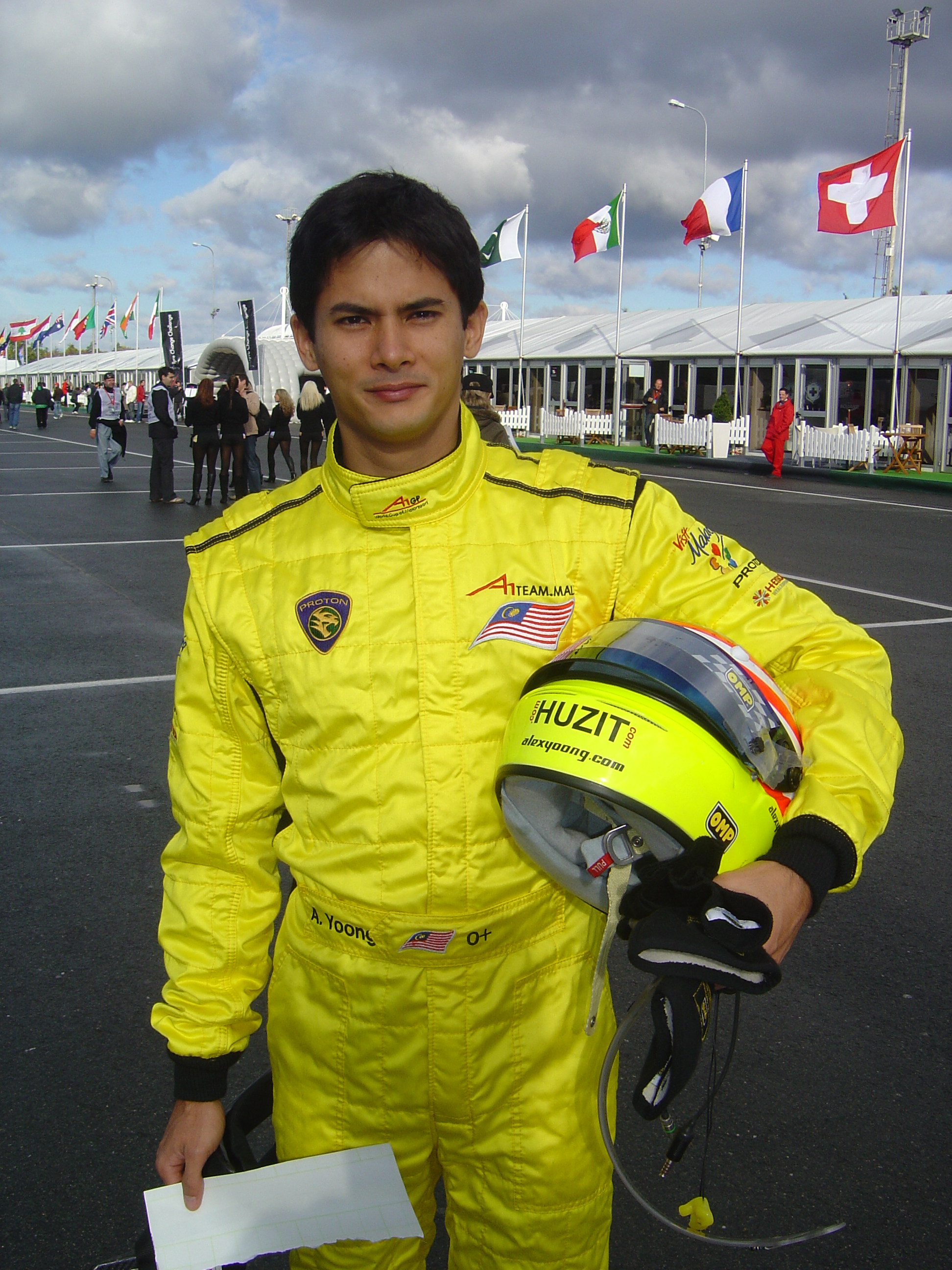
Yoong at an A1 Grand Prix series meeting.

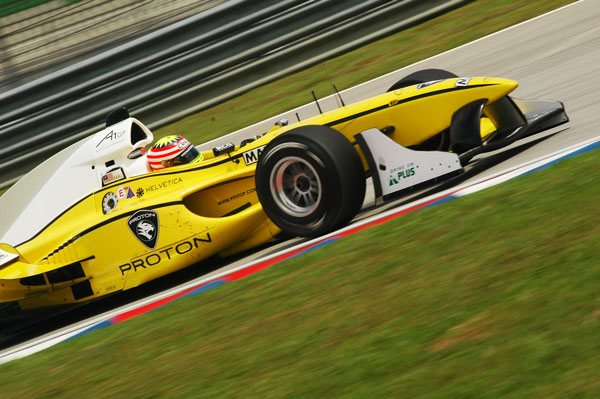
Since his arrival in A1 Grand Prix Yoong won three races: two sprint races and one feature race.

Yoong drove for A1 Team Malaysia in the A1 Grand Prix series. The series is widely regarded as rejuvenating Yoong's career and reputation. He became the lead driver and put together an outfit of primary Malaysian crew members, an example followed by other National teams. Amongst the non-Malaysians was team principal Jack Cunninghan and chief engineer Greg Wheeler. The first test session at Brands Hatch saw Yoong set the third fastest time behind France and Brazil and the second test had brought in GP2 Driver Fairuz Fauzy. In the inaugural race at Brands Hatch saw Yoong qualify 9th and finished 5th in the feature race after Fauzy drove in the sprint race. At the Lausitzring, Yoong started in 18th and charged up to seventh by the end of the first lap and ended up in sixth. Yoong drove at Eastern Creek to qualify ninth and finished eighth and fifth respectively. At his home race in Malaysia, Yoong repeated his results at Eastern Creek in Australia.

In Dubai, Yoong started eighth and held off Jos Verstappen for tenth place and one point in the sprint race but an early spin in the feature event put a strong result out of the question. In Durban, the team gained Proton as a sponsor, but two consecutive retirements followed. Yoong made up for the retirements with a good qualifying for sixth place and finished fourth in the sprint race after a terrific overtaking pass on Neel Jani. The Indonesia round gave him a sixth place in qualifying and finished fourth in the sprint race after performing an overtake on Neel Jani who was driving with a loose win after a collision with Tomáš Enge. Yoong also gained a second place in the feature race, which saw him sustain three minor collisions and a mistimed, delayed pit stops and many overtaking moves.

At Monterrey, a tenth place on the grid followed by a seventh in the sprint race and 11th in the feature race. At the penultimate round at Mazda Raceway Laguna Seca, Yoong qualified fourth and a sprint race that saw wet conditions led to him spinning off and having to start at the back for the feature race where he climbed to tenth and one point. The final two rounds in China saw a victory in the sprint race whilst Yoong scored a podium in the feature race by finishing second.

2006–07

The first round in Amsterdam saw Yoong collide with a stalled car before the warm-up lap but set the fastest lap and finished 17th and earlier ended up 12th in the sprint race. The race at Brno, became Yoong's best results winning in both the sprint and feature races. In Australia, Yoong finished seventh and sixth, respectively. At the Round in Mexico, Yoong started from pole and gave Malaysia their third win of 2006–07 in the sprint race at the Autodromo Hermandos Rodriguez Circuit.

Yoong received the Bruce McLaren trophy on 28 April 2007 for his strong performance in the 2006–07 A1GP season

2007–08

For 2007–08, Yoong was announced to remain with Malaysia and was partnered alongside Aaron Lim. At Zandvoort, Yoong qualified 20th for both races. Yoong suffered from four consecutive retirements from the races in Zhuhai and New Zealand. He did not attend the races at Australia and South Africa, bringing an end to starting 45 successive races. The decision came from the team electing to run Fairuz Fauzy. In Shanghai, Yoong started from 6th in the Sprint race and managed to climb up to fourth where he finished and scored sixth in the sprint race.

=== Le Mans Series ===
After the 2005–06 A1 Grand Prix season, Yoong raced in the 2006 Le Mans Series as well as the 2006 Le Mans 24 Hrs for Jan Lammers, the A1 Team Netherlands seat holder with team Racing For Holland. Yoong was very competitive, holding the third position in Lammers' Dome-Judd when the throttle stuck, sending the car into the wall at the first chicane on the Mulsanne Straight and breaking both steering arms. In the race at Istanbul, Yoong set the fastest lap 90 minutes into the race and retired after the starter motor failed during a pit stop. Lammers and Yoong elected not to attend the Spa 1000 km event after the team decided to change the engine from a Mugen to a Judd.

After the 2006–07 A1 Grand Prix season, Yoong once again returned to the Le Mans Series with Charouz Racing System. He teamed up with Jan Charouz of the Czech Republic and Stefan Mucke of Germany. The team entered the most famous of endurance races, the 24 Heures du Mans and the Le Mans Series.

In the 2007 24 Hours of Le Mans, the team completed 338 laps and finished in eighth overall and fifth in LMP1 Class.

=== GP2 Asia Series ===
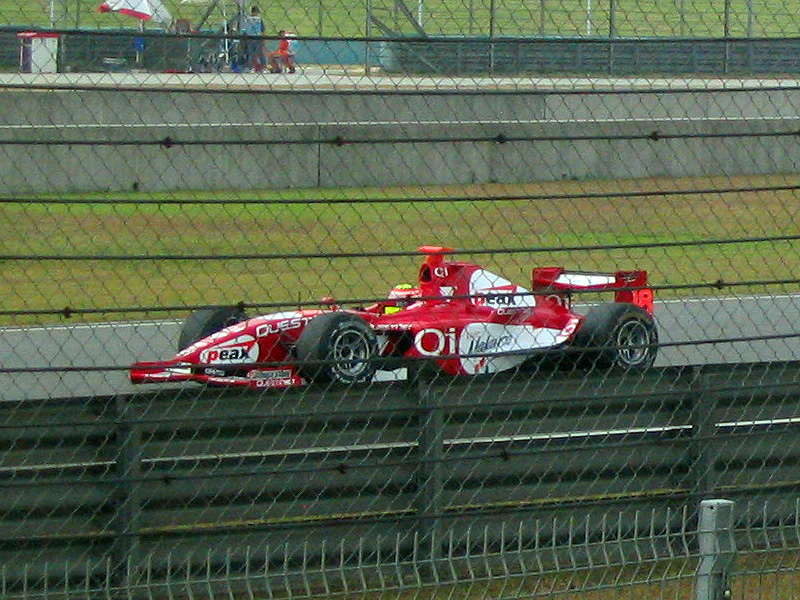
Yoong driving his Meritus GP2 Asia race car in Shanghai.

For the 2008–09 GP2 Asia Series season, Yoong signed to drive for the Qi-Meritus Mahara team. He was replaced by Marco Bonanomi for the third race weekend in Bahrain, due to a lack of sufficient time for racing.

=== Lotus Young Driver Programme ===
Lotus Racing announced on 9 December 2009 that Yoong would become the leader of their young driver development programme. Yoong currently focuses on the development of drivers in Asia.

=== Intercontinental Le Mans Cup ===
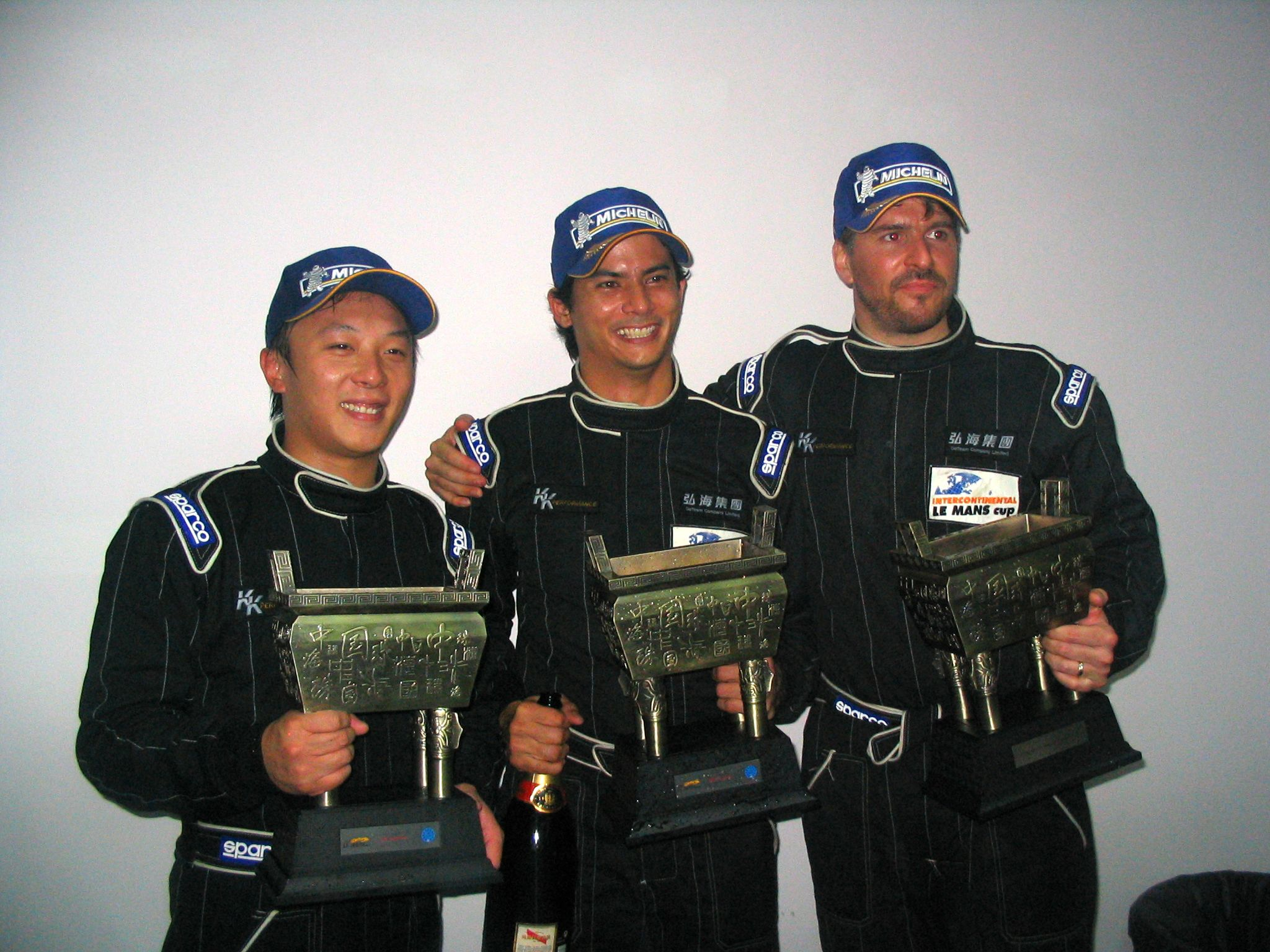
Alex Yoong (centre) with Marchy Lee (left) and Matthew Marsh (right) after winning the GTC class of the 2010 1000 km of Zhuhai.

In November 2010, Yoong partnered Marchy Lee and Matthew Marsh at the 1000km Zhuhai race, driving an Audi R8 LMS. The trio won the GTC class.

=== 2011 SEA Games ===
Yoong has earlier competed for the water skiing event in the 1997 Jakarta Games where he won a silver medal. He returned to Water skiing at the 2011 Southeast Asian Games and he claimed one gold medal and one silver medal in the men's slalom and jump events on 17 November 2011.

Yoong was a representative for Malaysia in the 1992 Junior World Waterski Championships held in Colombia, before he concentrated on his motorsport career.

=== Audi R8 LMS Cup ===
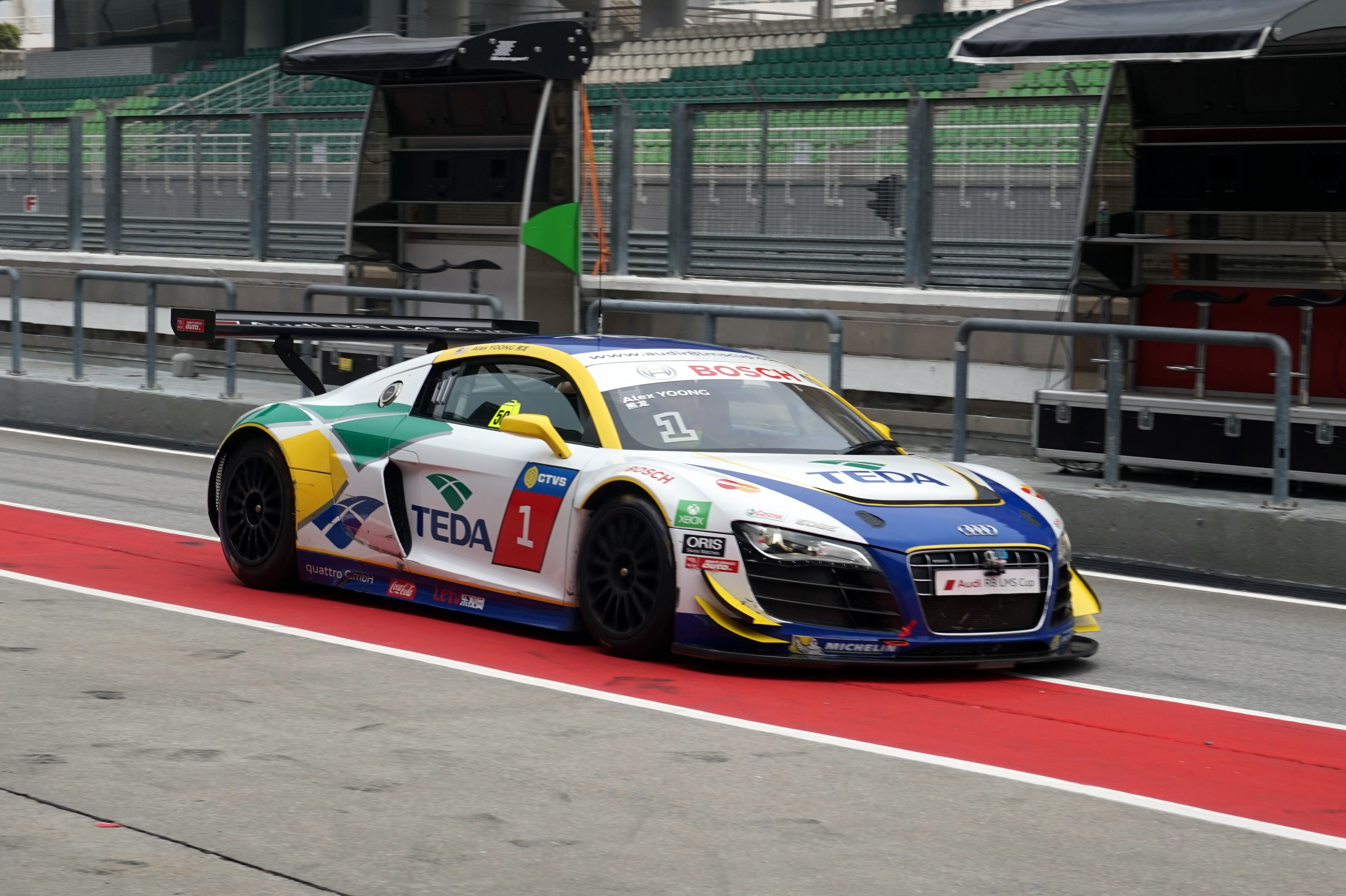
Alex Yoong driving his Audi R8 LMS Cup car, 2015

Yoong is currently a driver in the Audi R8 LMS Cup with Audi TEDA. In the inaugural race in Shanghai, Yoong started second on the grid. At the start, he overtook rival Marchy Lee at the first corner and won the race. In the second race, Yoong finished second behind Adderly Fong. The third round in Zhuhai, saw Yoong qualified on pole and during the race, he lost the lead as Lee overtook the Malaysian and Yoong was third at the end of lap one and in front a four-car battle that took place behind him. He eventually finished on the final podium position in third. During the fourth round, he finished third after an overtaking manoeuvre with Lee resulted in Yoong taking damage to his car.

== Personal life ==
Yoong married Arriana Teoh in 2002, who is the Miss World 1997 Malaysia and the couple has a son, Alister, born on 10 January 2003 weighing in at 3.1 kg and 52.5 cm tall. Alister is also a racing driver, currently racing in Italian Prototype and has competed in the Formula 4 South East Asia Championship and the Indian Racing League.

Yoong's younger sisters Aaliyah Yoong (born 16 July 2003) and Philippa Yoong are both water skiers. Aaliyah became the youngest ever gold medallist in the history of the SEA Games since its inception in 1959, when she won gold medal in water skiing at the 2011 SEA Games with a record of 2,960 points to finish ahead of Promsunitsit Sareeya of Thailand, who managed 2,570 points. Philippa Yoong claimed the bronze for Malaysia with 1,860 points. Philippa also won the gold medal in the women's slalom event, 14 years after her initial triumph in Jakarta in 1997. It is her second SEA Games gold medal.

Yoong has remained an enthusiastic promoter of motorsports in his home country however, and has been seen doing media and Formula One commentating work for Malaysian television and Fox Sports Asia. He also co-presented Formula One live coverage at 8TV.

== Racing record ==
=== Complete British Formula Three Championship results ===
(key) (Races in bold indicate pole position, races in italics indicate fastest lap)

Year	Entrant	Chassis	Engine	1	2	3	4	5	6	7	8	9	10	11	12	13	14	15	16	DC	Points
1997	Portman Racing	Dallara F397	HKS Mitsubishi	DON	SIL	THR	BRH	SIL	CRO	OUL	SIL	PEM	PEM	DON	SNE	SNE	SPA; 16	SIL; 11	THR	29th	0
1998	Portman Racing	Dallara F398	Renault Sodemo	DON; 12	THR; 8	SIL; 6	BRH; 8	BRH; 8	OUL; 9	SIL; 11	CRO; Ret	SNE; 7	SIL; 6	PEM	PEM	DON				13th	35
1998	Alan Docking Racing	Dallara F398	Mugen-Honda														THR; 9	SPA; 6	SIL; Ret	13th	35
1999	Alan Docking Racing	Dallara F399	Mugen-Honda	DON	SIL	THR; 6	BRH; 5	BRH; 2	OUL; 6	CRO	BRH									11th	37
1999	Graff Racing	Dallara F399	Mugen-Honda									SIL; 11	SNE	PEM	PEM	DON	SPA	SIL	THR	11th	37

=== Complete International Formula 3000 results ===
(key) (Races in bold indicate pole position; races in italics indicate fastest lap.)

Year	Entrant	1	2	3	4	5	6	7	8	9	10	DC	Points
1999	Monaco Motorsport	IMO	MON	CAT	MAG	SIL	A1R; DNQ	HOC; DNQ	HUN; DNQ	SPA; Ret	MNZ; Ret	NC	0

=== Complete Italian Formula 3000 results ===
(key) (Races in bold indicate pole position; races in italics indicate fastest lap.)

Year	Entrant	1	2	3	4	5	6	7	DC	Points
1999	Monaco Motorsport	VLL	MNZ	PER; 5	DON; 2	MIS; 9	MIS; 15	IMO; Ret	10th	8

=== Complete Formula Nippon results ===
(key) (Races in bold indicate pole position; races in italics indicate fastest lap.)

Year	Entrant	Chassis	Engine	1	2	3	4	5	6	7	8	9	10	DC	Points
2000	Team LeMans	Reynard	Mugen-Honda	SUZ; DNS	MOT; Ret	MIN; Ret	FUJ; 9	SUZ; 11	SUG; 9	MOT; Ret	FUJ; 12	MIN; Ret	SUZ; Ret	18th	0
2001	Team LeMans	Reynard	Mugen-Honda	SUZ; 11	MOT; Ret	MIN; 7	FUJ; 7	SUZ; 10	SUG; Ret	FUJ	MIN	MOT	SUZ	16th	0

=== Complete Formula One results ===
(key)

Year	Entrant	Chassis	Engine	1	2	3	4	5	6	7	8	9	10	11	12	13	14	15	16	17	WDC	Pts.
2001	European Minardi F1	Minardi PS01B	European V10	AUS	MAL	BRA	SMR	ESP	AUT	MON	CAN	EUR	FRA	GBR	GER	HUN	BEL	ITA; Ret	USA; Ret	JPN; 16	26th	0
2002	KL Minardi Asiatech	Minardi PS02	Asiatech V10	AUS; 7	MAL; Ret	BRA; 13	SMR; DNQ	ESP; WD	AUT; Ret	MON; Ret	CAN; 14	EUR; Ret	GBR; DNQ	FRA; 10	GER; DNQ	HUN	BEL	ITA; 13	USA; Ret	JPN; Ret	20th	0

=== Complete CART results ===
(key)

Year	Team	No.	Chassis	Engine	1	2	3	4	5	6	7	8	9	10	11	12	13	14	15	16	17	18	19	Rank	Points	Ref
2003	Dale Coyne Racing	11	Lola B02/00	Ford XFE V8t	STP	MTY; 9	LBH; 19	BRH; 18	LAU; 17	MIL	LS	POR	CLE	TOR	VAN	ROA	MDO	MTL	DEN	MIA	MXC	SRF	FON	**23rd**	**4**	

=== Complete A1 Grand Prix results ===
(key) (Races in bold indicate pole position) (Races in italics indicate fastest lap)

Year	Entrant	1	2	3	4	5	6	7	8	9	10	11	12	13	14	15	16	17	18	19	20	21	22	DC	Points	Ref
2005–06	Malaysia	GBR; SPR	GBR; FEA; 5	GER; SPR; 6	GER; FEA; 16	POR; SPR	POR; FEA	AUS; SPR; 8	AUS; FEA; 5	MYS; SPR	MYS; FEA; 5	UAE; SPR; 10	UAE; FEA; Ret	RSA; SPR; Ret	RSA; FEA; Ret	IDN; SPR; 4	IDN; FEA; 2	MEX; SPR; 7	MEX; FEA; 11	USA; SPR; Ret	USA; FEA; 10	**CHN**; **SPR**; 1	CHN; FEA; 2	5th	74	
2006–07	Malaysia	NED; SPR; 12	NED; FEA; 17	CZE; SPR; 1	CZE; FEA; 1	BEI; SPR; 14	BEI; FEA; 12	MYS; SPR; 4	MYS; FEA; 7	IDN; SPR; 12	IDN; FEA; 5	NZL; SPR; 19	NZL; FEA; 11	AUS; SPR; 7	AUS; FEA; 6	RSA; SPR; Ret	RSA; FEA; 8	**MEX**; **SPR**; 1	MEX; FEA; 5	SHA; SPR; 6	SHA; FEA; 11	GBR; SPR; 5	GBR; SPR; 9	6th	55	
2007–08	Malaysia	NED; SPR; 16	NED; FEA; Ret	CZE; SPR; 17	CZE; FEA; 14	MYS; SPR; 9	MYS; FEA; 13	ZHU; SPR; Ret	ZHU; FEA; Ret	NZL; SPR; Ret	NZL; FEA; Ret	AUS; SPR	AUS; FEA	RSA; SPR	RSA; FEA	MEX; SPR; 9	MEX; FEA; 15	SHA; SPR; 4	SHA; FEA; 6	GBR; SPR	GBR; SPR			15th	25	

=== 24 Hours of Le Mans results ===
Year	Team	Co-drivers	Car	Class	Laps	Pos.	Class pos.
2006	(Netherlands) Racing for Holland	(Netherlands) Jan Lammers (Sweden) Stefan Johansson	Dome S101Hb-Judd	LMP1	182	DNF	DNF
2007	(Czech Republic) Charouz Racing System	(Czech Republic) Jan Charouz (Germany) Stefan Mücke	Lola B07/17-Judd	LMP1	338	8th	5th

=== Complete GP2 Series results ===
==== Complete GP2 Asia Series results ====
(key) (Races in bold indicate pole position) (Races in italics indicate fastest lap)

Year	Entrant	1	2	3	4	5	6	7	8	9	10	11	12	DC	Points
2008–09	Qi-Meritus Mahara	CHN; FEA; 14	CHN; SPR; 9	DUB; FEA; Ret	DUB; SPR; C	BHR1; FEA	BHR1; SPR	QAT; FEA	QAT; SPR	MYS; FEA	MYS; SPR	BHR2; FEA	BHR2; SPR	25th	0

=== Complete V8 Supercar results ===
(key) (Races in bold indicate pole position) (Races in italics indicate fastest lap)

Year	Team	No.	Car	1	2	3	4	5	6	7	8	9	10	11	12	13	Position	Points	Ref
2004	WPS Racing	48	Ford BA Falcon	ADL	ECK	PUK	HDV	PTH	QLD	WIN	OPK	SAN; 21	BAT; 15	SUR; 29	SYM	ECK	36th	278	

=== Complete Bathurst 1000 results ===
Year	Team	Car	Co-driver	Position	Laps	Ref
2004	WPS Racing	Ford Falcon BA	(Australia) Neil McFadyen	15th	159	

=== Complete Audi R8 LMS Cup results ===
(key) (Races in bold indicate pole position) (Races in italics indicate fastest lap)

Year	Entrant	1	2	3	4	5	6	7	8	9	10	11	12	13	DC	Points
2012	Audi GQ	SIC1; 1	**SIC2**; 2	ZIC1; 6	ZIC2; 3	OIC1; 2	OIC2; Ret	**ZIC3**; 1	ZIC4; 1	SIC3; DNP	SIC4; DNP	**SIC5**; 4	**SIC6**; 4		**3rd**	**167**
2013	Audi TEDA	ZIC1; 1	ZIC2; 2	OIC1; 6	OIC2; 1	ISC1; DNS	ISC2; 4	**SIC1**; 1	**SIC2**; 1	**SIC1**; 1	**SIC2**; 2	MAC; DNS			**2nd**	**186**
2014	Audi TEDA	KIC1; 3	KIC2; 1	FIS1; Ret	FIS2; 1	SIC1; 10	SIC2; 2	SIC1; 4	SIC2; 1	SIC3; 6	SIC4; 1	YMC1; 6	YMC2; 1		**1st**	**189**
2015	Audi TEDA	ZIC1; 1	ZIC2; 1^{1}	KIC1; DNP	KIC2; DNP	PIC1; 7	PIC2; 3	PIC3; 2	SIC1; 1	SIC2; 4	**FIS1**; 1	FIS2; Ret	**SIC1**; 1	SIC2; 6	**1st**	**161**
2016	Audi TEDA	SIC1; 4	SIC2; 3	CIC1; 1	CIC2; 5	SIC1; 1	SIC2; 6	KIC1; Ret	KIC2; 1	**PIC1**; 4	PIC2; 3	**SIC3**; 2	SIC4; Ret		**1st**	**167**
2017	Audi R8 LMS Cup	SIC1; 8	SIC2; 1	SUZ1; 7	SUZ2; 14	KIC1; 1	KIC2; 5	SIC1	SIC2	ZHE1	ZHE2				4th	121

* Season still in progress
Notes:

- **^1** - The race halted at Lap 4 and did not restart. Because less than 50% of race distance had been completed, no points were awarded.

Sporting positions
Preceded by Adderly Fong	Audi R8 LMS Cup; Champion; 2014–2016	Succeeded by Alessio Picariello
