= Bob McMurray =

Cognitive scientist

- Occupations: F. Wendell Miller Professor of Psychological and Brain Science
- Awards: American Psychological Association Distinguished Scientific Award for Early Career Contribution to Developmental Psychology (2012)

Academic background
- Education: Cornell University; University of Rochester

Academic work
- Discipline: Psychology
- Sub-discipline: Brain Sciences
- Institutions: University of Iowa

Bob McMurray is a cognitive scientist known for his work examining speech perception and word recognition across the lifespan, from children to aging adults, and in individuals with language development or hearing disorders. He holds the position of F. Wendell Miller Distinguished Professor of Psychological and Brain Sciences at the University of Iowa.

In 2012, McMurray received the Distinguished Scientific Award for Early Career Contribution to Developmental Psychology from the American Psychological Association. He was subsequently awarded the 2013 Steven Yantis Early Career Award from the Psychonomic Society. McMurray was named a Fellow of the Association for the Advancement of Science in 2024.

== Biography ==
Bob McMurray was born in Bloomington, Indiana and grew up in Durham, North Carolina. During his adolescence, he worked during summers in Dr. Christopher Portier's lab at the National Institute for Environmental Health Sciences, examining dynamic models of tumor incidence. He was initially recruited by the University of Rochester for computer science but ultimately decided to enroll at Cornell University and study psychology. Before settling on psychology, he also considered music perception based on his work with Carol Krumhansl, as well as cognitive science. It was Frank Keil who convinced him to enroll in the rising Cognitive Studies program at Cornell.

McMurray received his B.A. degree in Psychology with a concentration in Cognitive Studies from Cornell University in 1998. He later attended graduate school at the University of Rochester where he obtained his M.S. and then Ph.D. in Brain and Cognitive Science in 2004, under the advisement of Michael Tanenhaus and Richard N. Aslin. His dissertation examined within-category variation in spoken word recognition.

After graduating, McMurray joined the faculty of the Psychology Department at the University of Iowa. There, he became the director of the Development, Learning, Theory, and Application (DeLTA) Center and later went on to achieve F. Wendell Miller Distinguished Professorship of Psychological and Brain Sciences.

In 2021, McMurray's team started the Growing Words Project, which was a five-year study examining how school-aged children develop abilities related to identifying both written and spoken word, funded by the National Institute of Health. Then in 2025, McMurray and his team in the Psychological and Brain Sciences Department at the University of Iowa were awarded a $794,490 grant from the National Science Foundation to examine speech sound distinction in both children and adults.

== Research ==
McMurray's research focuses on speech perception and spoken-word recognition in typically developing children and adults, as well as in individuals who posses language or hearing impairments. His research connects theories of speech perception to differences in concrete language and reading-skills, in order to better understand language disorders and help promote vocabulary learning. Additionally, McMurray also conducts research examining speech, perception, and word development in infants and young children, utilizing cognitive neuroscience techniques, eye tracking, and computational modeling.

Throughout the course of his career, McMurray has received multiple grants from the National Institute of Health and the National Science Foundation to conduct research examining cognitive mechanisms of language processing and speech perception and acoustic variability in normal and impaired listeners.

McMurray is a pioneer in the field of speech and language processing who has conducted significant and influential work of speech categories and learning and development. His work has demonstrated a dynamic learning process through which children's word-learning increases. Results of McMurray's research have important implications for identifying early signs of struggle in children learning to read and for promoting tools for educators in schools to better understand where differences in speech perception come from.

== Representative publications ==
- McMurray, B., Horst, J. S., & Samuelson, L. K. (2012). Word learning emerges from the interaction of online referent selection and slow associative learning. Psychological Review, 119(4), 831-877. https://doi.org/10.1037/a0029872
- McMurray, B., & Jongman, A. (2011). What information is necessary for speech categorization? Harnessing variability in the speech signal by integrating cues computed relative to expectations. Psychological Review, 118(2), 219-246. https://doi.org/10.1037/a0022325
- McMurray, B., Samelson, V. M., Lee, S. H., & Tomblin, J. B., (2010). Individual differences in online spoken word recognition: Implications for SLI. Cognitive Psychology, 60(1), 1-39. https://doi.org/10.1016/j.cogpsych.2009.06.003
- McMurray, B., Smith, F. X., Huffman, M., Rooff, K., Muegge, J.B., Jeppson, C., Kutlu, E., & Colby, S. E. M. (2024). Fundamental dimensions of real-time word recognition in challenging conditions: Insights from cochlear implant users. Nature Communication, 15(7382). https://doi.org/10.1038/s41467-024-51514-3
- McMurray, B., Tanenhaus, M. K., & Aslin, R. N. (2002). Gradient effects of within-category phonetic variation on lexical access. Cognition, 86(2), B33-B42. https://doi.org/10.1016/S0010-0277(02)00157-9
