= A1 Team New Zealand =

Motor racing team

- NZL
- Founded: 2005
- Seat holder(s): Colin Giltrap
- Team principal: Bob McMurray
- Race driver(s): Earl Bamber
- Car nickname: Black Beauty
- First race: 2005-06 Great Britain
- Rounds entered: 33
- Championships: 0
- Sprint race victories: 4
- Feature race victories: 3
- Pole positions: 4
- Fastest laps: 4
- Total points: 315
- 2008-09 position: 3rd (18 pts)

A1 Team New Zealand was the New Zealand team of A1 Grand Prix, an international racing series.

== Management ==
The team was formed by and is owned by prominent Auckland businessman Colin Giltrap, well known for this car dealerships. The team is managed by Kiwi Bob McMurray who retired last year after nearly 30 years involvement with the McLaren Formula One racing team. The car is run by David Sears' organisation, Super Nova Racing, as is the A1 Team Germany car, meaning that the two teams are often thought of as one. Prior to Super Nova's involvement, the car was run by West Surrey Racing, a British organisation run by New Zealander Dick Bennetts which fields the Team RAC cars in the British Touring Car Championship.

== History ==
=== 2008–09 season ===
Drivers: Earl Bamber, Chris van der Drift

Team New Zealand shocked the A1 paddock by revealing 18-year-old Earl Bamber as their main driver for the race in Zandvoort, even after the success of Jonny Reid in previous seasons. Bamber went on to record two podium finishes at a rain-soaked Zandvoort. However, his replacement Chris van der Drift had less success in Chengdu, China, only scoring two points in the Sprint Race and just missed out on points in the Feature Race.

=== 2007–08 season ===
Driver: Jonny Reid

Again, Team New Zealand challenged for the championship, but lost out at Great Britain to Switzerland. The team recorded 4 victories and 2 podiums.

=== 2006–07 season ===
Drivers: Matt Halliday, Jonny Reid

Team New Zealand were championship challengers this season, but even with 3 victories and 8 podiums, lost out by 35 points to Germany.

=== 2005–06 season ===
Drivers: Matt Halliday, Jonny Reid

In the inaugural season, Team New Zealand scored consistently, as well as a podium, to finish 4th in the championship.

== Drivers ==
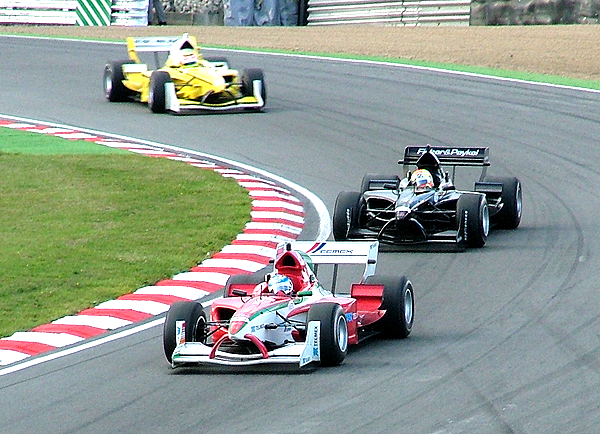
Halliday chases Team Mexico at Brands Hatch.

Name	Seasons	Races (Starts)	A1GP Title	Wins	Sprint wins	Main wins	2nd	3rd	Poles	Fastest Laps	Points
Earl Bamber	2008-09	1 (2)					1	1			18
Matt Halliday	2005-06, 2006-07	13 (26)						3			103
Jonny Reid	2005-06, 2006-07, 2007-08	19 (38)		7	4	3	5	3	4	4	219

== Complete A1 Grand Prix results ==
(key), "spr" indicate a Sprint Race, "fea" indicate a Main Race.

Year	Racing team	Chassis, Engine, Tyres	Drivers	1	2	3	4	5	6	7	8	9	10	11	12	13	14	15	16	17	18	19	20	21	22	Points	Rank
2005-06	West Surrey Racing	Lola, Zytek, Cooper Avon		GBR spr	GBR fea	GER spr	GER fea	PRT spr	PRT fea	AUS spr	AUS fea	MYS spr	MYS fea	ARE spr	ARE fea	ZAF spr	ZAF fea	IDN spr	IDN fea	MEX spr	MEX fea	USA spr	USA fea	CHN spr	CHN fea	77	4th
2005-06	West Surrey Racing	Lola, Zytek, Cooper Avon	Matt Halliday	3	4			14	16			6	6	15	13	6	4	8	7	Ret	8	8	12	8	4	77	4th
2005-06	West Surrey Racing	Lola, Zytek, Cooper Avon	Jonny Reid			4	4			14	8															77	4th
2006-07	Super Nova Racing	Lola; Zytek; Cooper Avon		NED spr	NED fea	CZE spr	CZE fea	BEI spr	BEI fea	MYS spr	MYS fea	IDN spr	IDN fea	NZ spr	NZ fea	AUS spr	AUS fea	ZAF spr	ZAF fea	MEX spr	MEX fea	SHA spr	SHA fea	GBR spr	GBR fea	93	2nd
2006-07	Super Nova Racing	Lola; Zytek; Cooper Avon	Matt Halliday	6	11			10	9									3	3					16	8	93	2nd
2006-07	Super Nova Racing	Lola; Zytek; Cooper Avon	Jonny Reid			Ret	7			3	8	1	1	3	3	2	2			16	6	2	1			93	2nd
2007-08	Super Nova Racing	Lola; Zytek; Cooper Avon		NED spr	NED fea	CZE spr	CZE fea	MYS spr	MYS fea	ZHU spr	ZHU fea	NZ spr	NZ fea	AUS spr	AUS fea	ZAF spr	ZAF fea	MEX spr	MEX fea	SHA spr	SHA fea	GBR spr	GBR fea			127	2nd
2007-08	Super Nova Racing	Lola; Zytek; Cooper Avon	Jonny Reid	9	7	1	1	5	8	10	2	1	4	2	9	20	10	1	12	Ret	4	8	8			127	2nd
2008-09	Super Nova Racing	Ferrari, Ferrari, Michelin		(Netherlands) NED		(China) CHN		(Malaysia) MYS		(New Zealand) NZL		(South Africa) RSA		(Portugal) POR		(United Kingdom) GBR										36	7th
2008-09	Super Nova Racing	Ferrari, Ferrari, Michelin		spr	fea	spr	fea	spr	fea	spr	fea	spr	fea	spr	fea	spr	fea									36	7th
2008-09	Super Nova Racing	Ferrari, Ferrari, Michelin	Earl Bamber	2	3			3	6			8	Ret	Ret	Ret	Ret	Ret									36	7th
2008-09	Super Nova Racing	Ferrari, Ferrari, Michelin	Chris van der Drift			7	11			5	13															36	7th
