= 2003 Formula Renault 2.0 UK Championship =

Seasons
- ← 2002 2004 →

The 2003 Formula Renault 2.0 UK Championship was the 15th British Formula Renault Championship. The season began at Snetterton on 19 April and ended on 21 September at Oulton Park, after seventeen rounds held in England, with 5 events only staging one race and the rest staging two.

== Main Series ==
=== Teams and drivers ===
Team	No.	Driver name	Rounds
Fortec Motorsport	1	(United Kingdom) Robert Scott	All
Fortec Motorsport	26	(United Kingdom) Mike Conway	All
Fortec Motorsport	38	(Republic of Ireland) Ronayne O'Mahoney	1–2, 5–11
Fortec Motorsport	43	(Republic of Ireland) James Murphy	1–8
Fortec Motorsport	43	(United Kingdom) Fulvio Mussi	9
Fortec Motorsport	43	(Italy) Luca Filippi	10
Fortec Motorsport	46	(United Kingdom) James Rossiter	All
Fortec Motorsport	83	(United Kingdom) Tom Tremayne	3
Team DFR	2	(United Kingdom) Barry Sime	1
Team DFR	2	(United Kingdom) Aaron Stroud	6, 10
Team DFR	2	(United Kingdom) Jonathan Adam	7, 9, 11
Team DFR	10	(Sweden) Stefan Söderberg	All
Manor Motorsport	3	(United Kingdom) Lewis Hamilton	1–10
Manor Motorsport	4	(Brazil) Sérgio Jimenez	1–10
Manor Motorsport	4	(Brazil) Allam Khodair	11
Manor Motorsport	5	(United Kingdom) Matthew Wilson	All
Manor Motorsport	66	(New Zealand) Fabian Coulthard	1–8
Manor Motorsport	66	(United Kingdom) Ryan Lewis	9, 11
Manor Motorsport	66	(Canada) Andrew Ranger	10
Team JVA	6	(United Kingdom) Charlie Hollings	All
Team JVA	7	(United Kingdom) Phil Glew	1–4
Team JVA	7	(United Kingdom) Paul di Resta	8–11
Team JVA	8	(France) Vasilije Calasan	1–9
Team JVA	18	(Peru) Juan Manuel Polar	1–4, 8–11
Jensen Motorsport	9	(Hong Kong) Paul Lau	1
Jensen Motorsport	9	(United Kingdom) Wayne Clarke	2–5
Jensen Motorsport	9	(United Kingdom) Jensen Lunn	6
Jensen Motorsport	9	(United Kingdom) Jamie Morrow	7, 10
Jensen Motorsport	9	(United Kingdom) Neil Doran	8–9
Jensen Motorsport	9	(United Kingdom) Shane Kelly	11
Jensen Motorsport	19	(United Kingdom) Fulvio Mussi	2–8, 10
Eurotek Motorsport	10	(United Kingdom) Tim Sisley	1–9
Eurotek Motorsport	11	(United Kingdom) Paul di Resta	1–7
Eurotek Motorsport	24	(United Kingdom) Marc McLoughlin	8
Eurotek Motorsport	24	(Russia) Vitaly Petrov	10
Paston Racing	12	(Canada) Brandon Thomas	2–11
Paston Racing	20	(United Kingdom) Ben Reeves	2–11
Motaworld Racing	14	(Italy) Matteo Meneghello	2–10
Motaworld Racing	15	(United Kingdom) Susie Stoddart	All
Motaworld Racing	16	(United Kingdom) Brandon Thomas	All
Motaworld Racing	17	(United Kingdom) Alex Lloyd	All
Mark Burdett Motorsport	21	(Turkey) Jason Tahinci	All
Mark Burdett Motorsport	22	(Sweden) Alexander Storckenfeldt	All
Hill Speed Racing	23	(China) Cheng Congfu	6–11
Scorpio Motorsport	25	(United Kingdom) David Epton	All
Scorpio Motorsport	88	(United Kingdom) James Gornall	5
Falcon Motorsport	27	(United Kingdom) Nik Goodfellow	1–2
Falcon Motorsport	27	(United Kingdom) John Byrne	4, 6–11
Welch Motorsport	34	(United Kingdom) Daniel Welch	2–5, 7–11
Status Motorsport	55	(Republic of Ireland) Philip Kershaw	1–10

=== Race calendar and results ===
Round		Circuit	Date	Pole position	Fastest lap	Winning driver	Winning team
1	R1	Snetterton Circuit, Norfolk	19 April	(United Kingdom) Lewis Hamilton	(United Kingdom) Mike Conway	(United Kingdom) Mike Conway	Fortec Motorsport
1	R2	Snetterton Circuit, Norfolk	20 April		(United Kingdom) Mike Conway	(United Kingdom) Alex Lloyd	Motaworld Racing
2	R3	Brands Hatch (Indy), Kent	5 May	(United Kingdom) Tom Sisley	(United Kingdom) Mike Conway	(United Kingdom) Tom Sisley	Eurotek Motorsport
3	R4	Thruxton Circuit, Hampshire	26 May	(United Kingdom) James Rossiter	(United Kingdom) Lewis Hamilton	(United Kingdom) James Rossiter	Fortec Motorsport
4	R5	Silverstone Circuit (International), Northamptonshire	8 June	(United Kingdom) Tom Sisley	(United Kingdom) Tom Sisley	(United Kingdom) Lewis Hamilton	Manor Motorsport
5	R6	Rockingham Motor Speedway, Northamptonshire	22 June	(United Kingdom) Lewis Hamilton	(United Kingdom) Lewis Hamilton	(United Kingdom) Lewis Hamilton	Manor Motorsport
6	R7	Croft Circuit, North Yorkshire	12 July	(United Kingdom) Lewis Hamilton	(United Kingdom) Brandon Thomas	(United Kingdom) Lewis Hamilton	Manor Motorsport
6	R8	Croft Circuit, North Yorkshire	13 July		(United Kingdom) Lewis Hamilton	(United Kingdom) Lewis Hamilton	Manor Motorsport
7	R9	Donington Park (GP), Leicestershire	26 July	(United Kingdom) Lewis Hamilton	(United Kingdom) Brandon Thomas	(United Kingdom) Tom Sisley	Eurotek Motorsport
7	R10	Donington Park (GP), Leicestershire	27 July		(United Kingdom) Lewis Hamilton	(United Kingdom) Lewis Hamilton	Manor Motorsport
8	R11	Snetterton Circuit, Norfolk	9 August	(United Kingdom) Lewis Hamilton	(United Kingdom) Lewis Hamilton	(United Kingdom) Lewis Hamilton	Manor Motorsport
9	R12	Brands Hatch (Indy), Kent	24 August	(United Kingdom) Lewis Hamilton	(United Kingdom) Lewis Hamilton	(United Kingdom) Lewis Hamilton	Manor Motorsport
9	R13	Brands Hatch (Indy), Kent	25 August		(United Kingdom) Lewis Hamilton	(United Kingdom) Lewis Hamilton	Manor Motorsport
10	R14	Donington Park (National), Leicestershire	9 September	(United Kingdom) Lewis Hamilton	(United Kingdom) Lewis Hamilton	(United Kingdom) Lewis Hamilton	Manor Motorsport
10	R15	Donington Park (National), Leicestershire	10 September		(United Kingdom) Lewis Hamilton	(United Kingdom) Lewis Hamilton	Manor Motorsport
11	R16	Oulton Park (Island), Cheshire	20 September	(United Kingdom) Paul di Resta	(United Kingdom) Mike Conway	(United Kingdom) Paul di Resta	Team JVA
11	R17	Oulton Park (Island), Cheshire	21 September		(United Kingdom) Paul di Resta	(United Kingdom) Alex Lloyd	Motaworld Racing

=== Drivers' Championship ===
- Points were awarded on a 32-28-25-22-20-18-16-14-12-11-10-9-8-7-6-5-4-3-2-1 basis, with 1 point for fastest lap. A driver's 15 best results counted towards the championship.

Pos	Driver	SNE		BRH	THR	SIL	ROC	CRO		DON		SNE	BRH		DON		OUL		Pts
Pos	Driver	1	2	3	4	5	6	7	8	9	10	11	12	13	14	15	16	17	Pts
1	(United Kingdom) Lewis Hamilton	**2**	3	Ret	2	1	**1**	**1**	**1**	**Ret**	1	**1**	**1**	**1**	**1**	**1**			419
2	(United Kingdom) Alex Lloyd	4	1	2	5	4	3	3	4	2	4	Ret	2	3	7	5	5	1	371
3	(United Kingdom) James Rossiter	3	4	5	**1**	3	2	Ret	2	3	3	2	3	4	2	24	DNS	8	347
4	(United Kingdom) Mike Conway	1	**2**	3	4	11	8	7	7	11	5	23	5	5	6	23	2	3	312
5	(United Kingdom) Tom Sisley	5	7	**1**	7	**2**	4	6	5	1	**2**	4	17	2					288
6	(Sweden) Stefan Söderberg	6	6	8	3	12	6	12	10	5	12	5	10	8	5	3	11	4	255
7	(United Kingdom) Paul di Resta	8	22	6	13	13	Ret	10	9	6	9	6	8	6	19	6	**1**	**2**	233
8	(United Kingdom) Mike Spencer	9	10	Ret	6	7	5	2	3	7	11	12	7	Ret	3	Ret	Ret	10	221
9	(United Kingdom) Susie Stoddart	10	9	12	11	Ret	7	13	11	9	10	3	4	7	Ret	4	10	5	215
10	(Sweden) Alexander Storckenfeldt	18	15	7	Ret	6	11	8	12	15	14	14	9	17	4	2	3	Ret	187
11	(Brazil) Sérgio Jimenez	13	12	Ret	12	8	Ret	4	6	4	8	7	6	Ret	DNS	DNS			150
12	(United Kingdom) Robert Scott	11	13	10	8	5	17	9	Ret	Ret	13	Ret	Ret	Ret	9	7	Ret	6	133
13	(United Kingdom) Charlie Hollings	16	Ret	11	14	14	9	18	15	10	15	Ret	14	15	16	13	4	12	124
14	(Italy) Matteo Meneghello			14	9	Ret	24	11	14	8	7	9	11	9	10	11			121
15	(New Zealand) Fabian Coulthard	7	8	9	Ret	9	10	14	13	Ret	6	25							98
16	(Republic of Ireland) James Murphy	Ret	5	Ret	15	10	12	5	8	Ret	16	10							96
17	(United Kingdom) David Epton	14	17	13	18	Ret	16	Ret	21	13	Ret	20	18	10	11	12	Ret	7	85
18	(United Kingdom) Matthew Wilson	19	16	Ret	16	17	13	16	17	12	21	13	12	11	Ret	22	Ret	13	77
19	(United Kingdom) John Byrne					23		24	22	17	24	18	13	16	8	9	7	Ret	62
20	(United Kingdom) Phil Glew	12	11	4	10	Ret													52
21	(Turkey) Jason Tahinci	20	14	Ret	Ret	22	19	15	16	18	18	16	Ret	22	Ret	17	15	14	49
22	(United Kingdom) Daniel Welch			Ret	17	Ret	Ret			NC	17	11	15	23	Ret	16	6	Ret	47
23	(Peru) Juan Manuel Polar	15	Ret	Ret	23	19						Ret	24	12	Ret	14	16	11	39
24	(Republic of Ireland) Philip Kershaw	Ret	19	Ret	20	Ret	Ret	17	Ret	16	Ret	17	16	13	15	Ret			35
25	(Canada) Brandon Thomas			18	22	21	23	19	18	14	19	Ret	22	21	Ret	18	8	Ret	34
26	(United Kingdom) Ben Reeves			Ret	Ret	16	15	23	19	Ret	Ret	Ret	Ret	Ret	17	19	9	Ret	31
27	(Republic of Ireland) Ronayne O'Mahony	22	23	DNS			20	20	23	20	23	15	20	20	13	Ret	14	Ret	26
28	(Russia) Vitaly Petrov														12	8			23
29	(Brazil) Allam Khodair																13	9	20
30	(China) Cheng Congfu									Ret	Ret	21	21	18	21	15	17	15	19
31	(Canada) Andrew Ranger														14	10			18
32	(United Kingdom) Marc McLoughlin											8							14
33	(United Kingdom) Jonathan Adam									21	22		19	19			12	Ret	13
34	(United Kingdom) Wayne Clarke			16	24	15	22												11
35	(France) Vasilije Calasan	21	21	17	21	20	18	22	20	Ret	20	22	DNS	DNS					10
36	(United Kingdom) Fulvio Mussi			DNS	19	18	21	21	Ret	19	Ret	24	DNS	DNS	22	20			8
37	(United Kingdom) James Gornall						14												7
38	(United Kingdom) Ryan Lewis												Ret	14			Ret	Ret	7
39	(United Kingdom) Nik Goodfellow	23	20	15															7
40	(United Kingdom) Barry Sime	17	18																7
41	(United Kingdom) Aaron Stroud							25	Ret						18	Ret			3
42	(United Kingdom) Neil Doran											19	23	Ret					2
43	(United Kingdom) Shane Kelly														20	21			1
–	(United Kingdom) Jamie Morrow									Ret	Ret		DNS	DNS					0
–	(Hong Kong) Paul Lau	Ret	DNS																0
–	(United Kingdom) Jensen Lunn							Ret	DNS										0
–	(Italy) Luca Filippi														Ret	DNS			0
–	(United Kingdom) Tom Tremayne			DNS															0
Pos	Driver	SNE		BRH	THR	SIL	ROC	CRO		DON		SNE	BRH		DON		OUL		Pts

Colour	Result
Gold	Winner
Silver	Second place
Bronze	Third place
Green	Points classification
Blue	Non-points classification
Blue	Non-classified finish (NC)
Purple	Retired, not classified (Ret)
Red	Did not qualify (DNQ)
Red	Did not pre-qualify (DNPQ)
Black	Disqualified (DSQ)
White	Did not start (DNS)
White	Withdrew (WD)
White	Race cancelled (C)
Blank	Did not practice (DNP)
Blank	Did not arrive (DNA)
Blank	Excluded (EX)

**Bold** – Pole
Italics – Fastest Lap

== Winter Series ==
=== Teams and drivers ===
Team	No.	Driver name	Rounds
Manor Motorsport	1	(Venezuela) Rodolfo González	All
Manor Motorsport	2	(United Kingdom) Jonathan Kennard	All
Manor Motorsport	3	(United Kingdom) John Byrne	All
Manor Motorsport	5	(United Kingdom) Pippa Mann	All
Fortec Motorsport	4	(United Kingdom) Mike Conway	All
Fortec Motorsport	16	(Netherlands) Danny Bleek	1
Fortec Motorsport	16	(United Kingdom) James Gornall	2
Fortec Motorsport	19	(Netherlands) Yelmer Buurman	All
Fortec Motorsport	27	(United Kingdom) Stuart Hall	All
Team Nasamax	6	(United Kingdom) Dean Stirling	All
Falcon Motorsport	7	(United Kingdom) Paul Rees	All
Falcon Motorsport	29	(United Kingdom) Alex Buncombe	All
Comtec Racing	8	(United Kingdom) Westley Barber	All
Team JLR	9	(United Kingdom) James Jakes	All
Team JLR	10	(United Kingdom) Tom Kimber-Smith	All
Team JVA	11	(United Kingdom) Matt Harris	All
Team JVA	12	(United Kingdom) Brandon Thomas	All
Team JVA	14	(United Kingdom) Sean Edwards	All
Team Firstair	15	(Republic of Ireland) James Murphy	All
Team Firstair	24	(Canada) Sean McIntosh	All
Team DFR	17	(Republic of Ireland) Patrick Hogan	All
Team DFR	20	(Sweden) Stefan Söderberg	All
Eurotek Motorsport	18	(United Kingdom) Jay Howard	All
Eurotek Motorsport	43	(Russia) Vitaly Petrov	1
Eurotek Motorsport	43	(Brazil) Ruben Carrapatoso	2
Eurotek Motorsport	44	(Italy) Luca Filippi	1
Eurotek Motorsport	44	(United Kingdom) Marc McLoughlin	2
Motaworld Racing	21	(United Kingdom) Joey Foster	All
Motaworld Racing	25	(United Kingdom) Susie Stoddart	All
Motaworld Racing	26	(United Kingdom) Tim Bridgman	All
Motaworld Racing	28	(United Kingdom) Oliver Jarvis	All
Mark Burdett Motorsport	22	(United Kingdom) Oliver Turvey	All
Mark Burdett Motorsport	30	(Peru) Juan Manuel Polar	All
2Win	23	(Belgium) Stephanie Boden	1
Welch Motorsport	33	(United Kingdom) Matt Nicoll-Jones	All
Hillspeed Racing	39	(United Kingdom) Josh Weber	All
tatus Motorsport	55	(Mexico) Mauricio Godanez	All
Virtulli Racing	88	(United Kingdom) Michael Virtulli	All

=== Race calendar and results ===
Round		Circuit	Date	Pole position	Fastest lap	Winning driver	Winning team
1	H1	Donington Park (GP), Leicestershire	25 October	(United Kingdom) Mike Conway	(United Kingdom) Mike Conway	(United Kingdom) Mike Conway	Fortec Motorsport
1	H2	Donington Park (GP), Leicestershire	25 October	(United Kingdom) Joey Foster	(United Kingdom) John Byrne	(United Kingdom) Jay Howard	Eurotek Motorsport
1	LC	Donington Park (GP), Leicestershire	26 October	(United Kingdom) James Jakes	(United Kingdom) Joey Foster	(United Kingdom) Joey Foster	Motaworld Racing
1	F	Donington Park (GP), Leicestershire	26 October	(United Kingdom) Mike Conway	(Russia) Vitaly Petrov	(Russia) Vitaly Petrov	Eurotek Motorsport
2	H1	Croft Circuit, North Yorkshire	1 November	(United Kingdom) Joey Foster	(Brazil) Ruben Carrapatoso	(United Kingdom) Westley Barber	Comtec Racing
2	H2	Croft Circuit, North Yorkshire	1 November	(Netherlands) Yelmer Buurman	(Netherlands) Yelmer Buurman	(Netherlands) Yelmer Buurman	Fortec Motorsport
2	LC	Croft Circuit, North Yorkshire	1 November	(United Kingdom) James Jakes	(United Kingdom) John Byrne	(United Kingdom) John Byrne	Manor Motorsport
2	F	Croft Circuit, North Yorkshire	1 November	(United Kingdom) Westley Barber	(United Kingdom) Westley Barber	(United Kingdom) Westley Barber	Comtec Racing

=== Drivers' Championship ===
Pos	Driver	DON				CRO				Pts
Pos	Driver	H1	H2	LC	F	H1	H2	LC	F	Pts
1	(United Kingdom) Jay Howard		1		2	5			5	57
2	(United Kingdom) Westley Barber	6			11	1			**1**	52
3	(Netherlands) Yelmer Buurman		5		8		**1**		3	49
4	(Russia) Vitaly Petrov	2			1					44
5	(United Kingdom) Alex Buncombe	3			5		2		6	44
6	(United Kingdom) Joey Foster		**Ret**	1	14	**3**			2	34
7	(Sweden) Stefan Söderberg		2		3	13		2	Ret	32
8	(United Kingdom) Mike Conway	**1**			**DNS**	2			Ret	29
9	(Republic of Ireland) James Murphy	4			4		6		12	29
10	(United Kingdom) Tim Bridgman		3		6		4		Ret	29
11	(Canada) Sean McIntosh		4		7	7			7	28
12	(United Kingdom) Brandon Thomas	8			13	4			4	27
13	(United Kingdom) John Byrne		6		10		11	1	8	15
14	(United Kingdom) Oliver Jarvis	5			9	6			Ret	15
15	(United Kingdom) Tom Kimber-Smith	7			12		3		13	14
16	(United Kingdom) Marc McLoughlin						8		9	7
17	(United Kingdom) Susie Stoddart	Ret		2	16		5		Ret	6
18	(United Kingdom) Oliver Turvey	9			18		7		17	6
19	(Venezuela) Rodolfo González		9		17		9		10	6
20	(United Kingdom) Dean Stirling		7		Ret		16	13	DNS	4
21	(Brazil) Ruben Carrapatoso					9			Ret	4
22	(United Kingdom) Pippa Mann		8		27	15		14	DNS	3
23	(United Kingdom) Sean Edwards		Ret	4	23	8			18	3
24	(Republic of Ireland) Patrick Hogan	10			Ret		13	3	Ret	1
25	(United Kingdom) Michael Virtulli		10		26	16		12	DNS	1
26	(United Kingdom) Josh Weber		Ret	5	19	10			Ret	1
27	(United Kingdom) Matt Nicoll-Jones	Ret		Ret	DNS		10		Ret	1
	(United Kingdom) James Jakes	11		**3**	24	11		**4**	14	0
	(United Kingdom) Stuart Hall	Ret		6	15	Ret		6	11	0
	(United Kingdom) Matt Harris	12		9	25	12		7	16	0
	(United Kingdom) Jonathan Kennard	Ret		11	21		12	9	DNS	0
	(Peru) Juan Manuel Polar		Ret	Ret	DNS	14		5	Ret	0
	(United Kingdom) Paul Rees		Ret	12	DNS		14	10	DNS	0
	(United Kingdom) James Gornall						15	8	15	0
	(Mexico) Mauricio Godanez	Ret		10	20		17	11	DNS	0
	(Belgium) Stephanie Boden	Ret		8	22					0
	(Italy) Luca Filippi		Ret	7	Ret					0
	(Netherlands) Danny Bleek		Ret	13	DNS					0
Pos	Driver	H1	H2	LC	F	H1	H2	LC	F	Pts
Pos	Driver	DON				CRO				Pts

Colour	Result
Gold	Winner
Silver	Second place
Bronze	Third place
Green	Points classification
Blue	Non-points classification
Blue	Non-classified finish (NC)
Purple	Retired, not classified (Ret)
Red	Did not qualify (DNQ)
Red	Did not pre-qualify (DNPQ)
Black	Disqualified (DSQ)
White	Did not start (DNS)
White	Withdrew (WD)
White	Race cancelled (C)
Blank	Did not practice (DNP)
Blank	Did not arrive (DNA)
Blank	Excluded (EX)

**Bold** – Pole
Italics – Fastest Lap
