= 2006 Sentul A1GP round (December) =

A1 Grand Prix race

2006-07 A1GP of Indonesia

Race Details
- Race 5 of 11 in the 2006-07 A1 Grand Prix season
- Date: 10 December 2006
- Location: Sentul International Circuit; Sentul, Indonesia

Qualifying
- Pole: New Zealand (Jonny Reid)
- Time: 2:33.242 (1:16.732, 1:16.510)

Sprint Race
- 1st: New Zealand (Jonny Reid)
- 2nd: Mexico (Salvador Duran)
- 3rd: Great Britain (Robbie Kerr)

Main Race
- 1st: New Zealand (Jonny Reid)
- 2nd: Germany (Nico Hülkenberg)
- 3rd: France (Nicolas Lapierre)

Fast Lap
- FL: Great Britain (Robbie Kerr)
- Time: 1 min 18.110 sec, (Lap 4 of Sprint Race)

Official Classifications
- [ Prac1-A] ·[ Prac1-B] ·[ Prac2] ·[ Prac3] ·[ Qual] ·[ SRace] ·[ MRace]

Layout of the Sentul International Circuit

The 2006–07 A1 Grand Prix of Nations, Indonesia was an A1 Grand Prix race held on 10 December 2006 at Sentul International Circuit, Indonesia. It was the fifth race in the 2006-07 A1 Grand Prix season and the second event held at the circuit.

== Results ==
=== Sprint race results ===
The Sprint race took place on Sunday, 10 December 2006

Pos	Team	Driver	Laps	Time	Points
1	New Zealand	Jonny Reid	15	19'41.054	6
2	Mexico	Salvador Duran	15	+ 0.738	5
3	(United Kingdom) Great Britain	Robbie Kerr	15	+ 3.463	4
4	(United States) USA	Philip Giebler	15	+ 9.080	3
5	Germany	Nico Hülkenberg	15	+ 10.000	2
6	Australia	Ryan Briscoe	15	+ 10.637	1
7	France	Nicolas Lapierre	15	+ 12.003	
8	Canada	Sean McIntosh	15	+ 14.366	
9	South Africa	Alan van der Merwe	15	+ 15.989	
10	Switzerland	Neel Jani	15	+ 17.633	
11	Italy	Enrico Toccacelo	15	+ 18.901	
12	Malaysia	Alex Yoong	15	+ 23.670	
13	Netherlands	Jeroen Bleekemolen	15	+ 24.148	
14	Indonesia	Ananda Mikola	15	+ 25.978	
15	Brazil	Tuka Rocha	15	+ 36.060	
16	Czech Republic	Jaroslav Janis	15	+ 36.781	
17	(Republic of Ireland) Ireland	Richard Lyons	15	+ 37.195	
18	India	Armaan Ebrahim	15	+ 44.582	
19	Lebanon	Basil Shaaban	15	+ 44.997	
20	Pakistan	Nur B. Ali	15	+ 1'21.691	
21	China	Ho-Pin Tung	11	+ 4 laps	

=== Feature race results ===
The Feature race took place on Sunday, 10 December 2006

Pos	Team	Driver	Laps	Time	Points
1	New Zealand	Jonny Reid	47	1:10'36.607	10
2	Germany	Nico Hülkenberg	47	+ 1.178	9
3	France	Nicolas Lapierre	47	+ 4.262	8
4	Italy	Enrico Toccacelo	47	+ 8.661	7
5	Malaysia	Alex Yoong	47	+ 14.618	6
6	Mexico	Salvador Durán	47	+ 15.370	5
7	Czech Republic	Jaroslav Janis	47	+ 20.067	4
8	Switzerland	Neel Jani	47	+ 23.123	3
9	(United States) USA	Philip Giebler	47	+ 27.238	2
10	Australia	Ryan Briscoe	46	+ 1 lap	1
11	Indonesia	Ananda Mikola	46	+ 1 lap	
12	(Republic of Ireland) Ireland	Richard Lyons	46	+ 1 lap	
13	China	Ho-Pin Tung	46	+ 1 lap	
14	Brazil	Tuka Rocha	46	+ 1 lap	
15	Pakistan	Nur B. Ali	43	+ 4 laps	
DNF	(United Kingdom) Great Britain	Robbie Kerr	39	+ 8 laps	
DNF	Canada	Sean McIntosh	38	+ 9 laps	
DNF	South Africa	Alan van der Merwe	29	+ 18 laps	
DNF	India	Armaan Ebrahim	11	+ 36 laps	
DNF	Lebanon	Basil Shaaban	7	+ 40 laps	
DSQ	Netherlands	Jeroen Bleekemolen		DISQUALIFIED	

=== Total points ===
- Fastest lap:
