= Jody Firth =

British racing driver

- Nationality: (United Kingdom) British
- Born: 11 July 1981 (age 45) Wakefield, England

British GT career
- Debut season: 2009
- Categorisation: FIA Silver
- Former teams: Team WFR; Century Motorsport
- Starts: 27
- Championships: 1: 2009 (GT4)
- Wins: 11
- Best finish: 1st (GT4) in 2009

Previous series
- 2009–2012 2012 2012 2011–2012 2011 2010 2010 2009 2009 2009 2009 2005 2004: ELMS; WEC; ALMS; 24 Hours of Le Mans; SPEED EuroSeries; FLM; SPEED UK Series; Ginetta G50 Cup; GT4 European Cup; MR2 Racing Series; Nippon Challenge; British Formula Renault; Formula Renault UK Winter Series

Championship titles
- 2011 2010 2009: SPEED EuroSeries; SPEED UK Series (CN); British GT (GT4)
- Statistics up to date as of 7 July 2013.

Jody Firth (born 11 July 1981) is a British racing driver, who most recently competed in the 2009 season of the British GT Championship.

Having raced in a number of lower formulae, Firth has competed in the British GT Championship, the European Le Mans Series, the 24 Hours of Le Mans, the FIA World Endurance Championship, the SPEED EuroSeries and the American Le Mans Series. He won the GT4 category of the British GT Championship in 2009, and later won the SPEED UK Series in 2010 and the SPEED EuroSeries in 2011.

== Career ==
=== Early career ===
Firth, born in Wakefield, England, started his career in karting, finishing sixth in the Lincolnshire Kart Racing Club Rotax Max Senior in 2003, and nineteenth in the Lincolnshire Kart Racing Club Winter Series Rotax Max Senior in 2004. He made his car racing debut in 2004, entering the Formula Renault 2.0 UK Winter Series, driving for Embassy Racing, and he finished fourteenth overall. He then competed in twelve rounds of the Formula Renault 2.0 UK in 2005 for Team JLR, without great success; finishing 26th overall. He became team manager of Embassy Racing in mid-2005, and stepped back from driving.

=== 2009 ===
Firth returned to the cockpit in April 2009, partnering Nigel Moore in the British GT Championship, driving for Team WFR in a GT4-class Ginetta G50. However, his first professional race since 2005 actually came in the Ginetta G50 Cup season opener at the Brands Hatch Indy Circuit, driving for Hepworth International, with his best finish of the weekend being a fifth place in the second race. His first race in the British GT was the 2009 season's opening event, held at Oulton Park, where he and Moore finished eighth in race one, and ninth in race two, taking the GT4 class victory in both races. He and Moore were then entered in the Silverstone round of the GT4 European Cup, taking a victory in race one, before retiring in race two. Moore and Firth entered all eight rounds of the British GT Championship in 2009, with their best overall finish being seventh. The pair were GT4 class champions for that year, taking eleven class victories in total. During the season, Firth also entered two rounds of the MR2 Racing Series, driving a first-generation Toyota MR-2 prepared by Matthew Coggins.He qualified on pole, and won one of the two races he entered, taking the fastest lap. He also drove for Team WFR alongside Warren Hughes and Darren Manning in the 1000 km of Silverstone, part of the Le Mans Series, entering an Embassy WF01-Zytek in the LMP2 category, and finished fourth in class.

=== 2010–2011 ===
For 2010, he and Hughes entered the SPEED UK Series, driving for Team WFR in a Ligier JS49. The partnership proved to be a successful one, with Hughes and Firth taking the title in the final round of the season. Firth also entered three rounds of the Formula Le Mans, driving for DAMS alongside Hughes, and they won the 1000 km of Algarve and 1000 km of Silverstone. The two victories saw the pair finish twelfth in the championship, with 30 points.

In 2011, Firth and Hughes stepped up from the SPEED UK Series into the SPEED EuroSeries, once more driving for Team WFR, but this time in the team's new WFR03 car. The pair won three of the nine races that season, and took a total of seven podiums on the way to the title. Firth also entered all five rounds of the Le Mans Series in 2011, driving for TDS Racing and partnering Mathias Beche and Pierre Thiriet in a LMP2 class Oreca 03. The team took two class wins, at the 1000 km of Spa and 6 Hours of Estoril, and finished fourth overall in the LMP2 championship. Firth also partnered Stefan Hodgetts in a Century Motorsport-entered Ginetta G55 at the Rockingham round of the British GT Championship, finishing fourth in race one, but retiring in race two.

=== 2012 ===
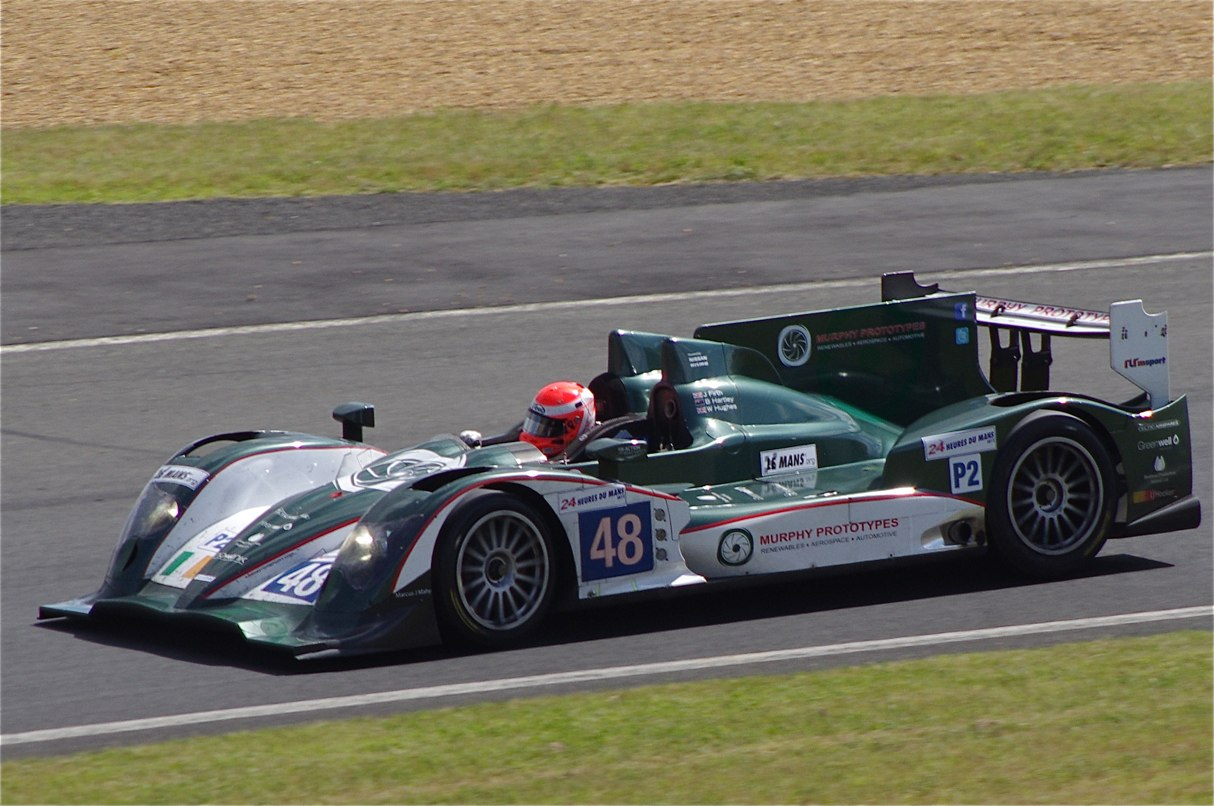
The Murphy Prototypes-entered Oreca 03 of Warren Hughes, Jody Firth, and Brendon Hartley, driven here by Hughes.

For 2012, Firth and Hughes joined Murphy Prototypes, who entered an Oreca 03 in the European Le Mans Series (ELMS), with Luca Moro also sharing the drive. Firth also drove for Team WFR in the British GT Championship, partnering Riki Christodoulou and driving a Ginetta G55. Having started the ELMS season with a retirement at the 6 Hours of Castellet, Firth competed in the season opener of the British GT Championship, held at Oulton Park, and finished fourteenth in race one, and sixteenth in race two. His British GT campaign would ultimately prove unsuccessful; his best result came at Rockingham, where he finished twelfth, and as a result, he and Christodoulou did not score a point all season. His ELMS season was a little more successful, with a third place during the 6 Hours of Donington being the team's best result in the series (Brendon Hartley having replaced Moro). Firth eventually finished tenth in class in the ELMS LMP2 championship, with fifteen points. During 2012, Murphy Prototypes also entered Firth, Hughes and Hartley in two rounds of the World Endurance Championship (WEC), one round of the American Le Mans Series (ALMS), and the 24 Hours of Le Mans. The team's best WEC result came at the 6 Hours of Spa-Francorchamps, where they finished third in class, and tenth overall; whilst they finished ninth in class, and sixteenth overall, in their other WEC race, the 6 Hours of Silverstone. The ALMS and 24 Hours of Le Mans ventures proved to be less successful; they retired from their ALMS event, the Petit Le Mans, after 330 laps due to electrical failure, and retired from the 24 Hours of Le Mans after 196 laps due to suspension failure.

=== 2013 ===
On 16 April 2013, United Autosports announced that Firth would be replacing the injured Richard Meins for the rest of the British GT season, partnering Mark Blundell in a McLaren MP4-12C GT3. In Firth's first race of the season, he retired from the event, held at Rockingham. He and Blundell retired once more in the following round, held at Silverstone, after four laps. Firth's first finish of the season came in the first race of the Snetterton round, an eighth place, whilst he and Geddie followed this up with a fifteenth-place finish in race two. In the next race, held at Brands Hatch, the pair completed 34 laps before retiring. Firth finished joint-26th in the GT3 driver's standings, level with David and Godfrey Jones.

=== 24 Hours of Le Mans results ===
| Year | Team | Co-Drivers | Car | Class | Laps | Pos. | Class Pos. |
|---|---|---|---|---|---|---|---|
| 2012 | (Republic of Ireland) Murphy Prototypes | (United Kingdom) Warren Hughes (New Zealand) Brendon Hartley | Oreca 03-Nissan | LMP2 | 196 | DNF | DNF |

=== 2018 ===
Firth was jailed by Leeds Combined Court for money laundering in July 2018. He was sentenced to five years and four months in prison and disqualified as a company director for five years.
