= 2004 Formula Renault 2.0 UK Championship =

Seasons
- ← 2003 2005 →

The 2004 Formula Renault 2.0 UK Championship was the 16th British Formula Renault Championship. The season began at Thruxton on 11 April and ended on 26 September at Donington, after twenty rounds held in England and Scotland, with all except round five supporting the British Touring Car Championship.

== Teams and drivers ==
Team	No.	Driver name	Rounds
Manor Motorsport	1	(China) Cheng Congfu	1–8
Manor Motorsport	1	(United Kingdom) Sam Edwards	10
Manor Motorsport	2	(Republic of Ireland) Patrick Hogan	All
Manor Motorsport	3	(United Kingdom) Paul di Resta	All
Manor Motorsport	4	(United Kingdom) Josh Weber	All
Hill Speed Racing	5	(Sweden) Stefan Söderberg	2–3
Paston Racing	6	(United Kingdom) Daniel Welch	1–2
Paston Racing	19	(Venezuela) Rodolfo González	1–3, 5
Paston Racing	30	(United States) Nick Jones	9–10
Paston Racing	31	(United Kingdom) Craig Dolby	All
Welch Motorsport	6	(United Kingdom) Daniel Welch	8–10
Team AKA	7	(United Kingdom) James Jakes	All
Team AKA	36	(Peru) Juan Manuel Polar	9–10
Comtec Racing with Duckhams	8	(United Kingdom) Westley Barber	All
Comtec Racing with Duckhams	9	(United Kingdom) Susie Stoddart	All
Team JVA	10	(United Kingdom) Sean Edwards	All
Team JVA	15	(United Kingdom) Pippa Mann	All
Team JVA	32	(United Kingdom) John Byrne	1–5
Team JVA	32	(United Kingdom) Joey Foster	9
Falcon Motorsport	12	(United Kingdom) Nik Goodfellow	1–5
Falcon Motorsport	12	(United Kingdom) Jamie Gruber	7–10
Falcon Motorsport	14	(Mexico) Carlos Mastretta Aguilera	All
Fortec Motorsport	11	(United Kingdom) Charlie Hollings	1–4, 6–10
Fortec Motorsport	16	(United States) Ben Freudenberg	All
Fortec Motorsport	17	(United Kingdom) Stuart Hall	All
Fortec Motorsport	26	(United Kingdom) Mike Conway	1–9
Fortec Motorsport	26	(Netherlands) Yelmer Buurman	10
J A Motorsport	20	(United Kingdom) James Gornall	1–6
Mark Burdett Motorsport	21	(Sweden) Alexander Storckenfeldt	1–6, 8–10
Mark Burdett Motorsport	22	(United Kingdom) Matt Russell	1–7, 10
Mark Burdett Motorsport	23	(Peru) Juan Manuel Polar	1–4
Mark Burdett Motorsport	23	(Venezuela) Rodolfo González	6–10
Team Firstair	24	(Canada) Sean McIntosh	All
Team Firstair	47	(Republic of Ireland) James Murphy	1–5
Team Firstair	47	(Brazil) Patrick Rocha	6–10
Team JLR	18	(Sweden) Stefan Söderberg	10
Team JLR	27	(South Africa) Stephen Simpson	All
Team JLR	28	(Turkey) Jason Tahinci	All
Team JLR	29	(United Kingdom) Dan Clarke	8–10
Motaworld Racing	34	(United Kingdom) Joey Foster	1–8
Motaworld Racing	34	(United Kingdom) Katherine Legge	9–10
Motaworld Racing	35	(United Kingdom) Oliver Jarvis	All
Motaworld Racing	37	(United Kingdom) David Epton	1–5
Motaworld Racing	37	(Brazil) Gustavo Sondermann	6–10
Eurotek Motorsport	43	(Brazil) Ruben Carrapatoso	1–4
Vitulli Racing	88	(United Kingdom) Michael Vitulli	1–3, 6–10

== Race calendar and results ==
Round		Circuit	Date	Pole position	Fastest lap	Winning driver	Winning team
1	R1	Thruxton Circuit, Hampshire	10 April	(United Kingdom) Mike Conway	(United Kingdom) Mike Conway	(United Kingdom) Mike Conway	Fortec Motorsport
1	R2	Thruxton Circuit, Hampshire	11 April	(United Kingdom) Mike Conway	(United Kingdom) Mike Conway	(United Kingdom) Mike Conway	Fortec Motorsport
2	R3	Brands Hatch (Indy), Kent	24 April	(United Kingdom) Westley Barber	(United Kingdom) Westley Barber	(United Kingdom) Westley Barber	Comtec Racing with Duckhams
2	R4	Brands Hatch (Indy), Kent	25 April	(United Kingdom) Mike Conway	(United Kingdom) Mike Conway	(United Kingdom) Westley Barber	Comtec Racing with Duckhams
3	R5	Silverstone Circuit (International), Northamptonshire	9 May	(United Kingdom) Paul di Resta	(Sweden) Alexander Storckenfeldt	(Sweden) Alexander Storckenfeldt	Mark Burdett Motorsport
3	R6	Silverstone Circuit (International), Northamptonshire	9 May	(United Kingdom) Mike Conway	(United Kingdom) Westley Barber	(United Kingdom) Mike Conway	Fortec Motorsport
4	R7	Oulton Park (Island), Cheshire	22 May	(United Kingdom) Westley Barber	(Canada) Sean McIntosh	(Canada) Sean McIntosh	Team Firstair
4	R8	Oulton Park (Island), Cheshire	23 May	(United Kingdom) Mike Conway	(United Kingdom) Mike Conway	(United Kingdom) Westley Barber	Comtec Racing with Duckhams
5	R9	Thruxton Circuit, Hampshire	30 May	(United Kingdom) Westley Barber	(United Kingdom) Mike Conway	(United Kingdom) Westley Barber	Comtec Racing with Duckhams
5	R10	Thruxton Circuit, Hampshire	30 May	(United Kingdom) Westley Barber	(United Kingdom) Mike Conway	(United Kingdom) Mike Conway	Fortec Motorsport
6	R11	Croft Circuit, North Yorkshire	25 July	(United Kingdom) Mike Conway	(United Kingdom) Mike Conway	(United Kingdom) Mike Conway	Fortec Motorsport
6	R12	Croft Circuit, North Yorkshire	25 July	(United Kingdom) Mike Conway	(United Kingdom) Mike Conway	(United Kingdom) Mike Conway	Fortec Motorsport
7	R13	Knockhill Circuit, Fife	8 August	(Brazil) Gustavo Sondermann	(United Kingdom) Mike Conway	(United Kingdom) Paul di Resta	Manor Motorsport
7	R14	Knockhill Circuit, Fife	8 August	(United Kingdom) Westley Barber	(United Kingdom) Westley Barber	(United Kingdom) Westley Barber	Comtec Racing with Duckhams
8	R15	Brands Hatch (Indy), Kent	22 August	(United Kingdom) Paul di Resta	(United Kingdom) Paul di Resta	(United Kingdom) Paul di Resta	Manor Motorsport
8	R16	Brands Hatch (Indy), Kent	22 August	(United Kingdom) Paul di Resta	(United Kingdom) Paul di Resta	(United Kingdom) Paul di Resta	Manor Motorsport
9	R17	Snetterton Circuit, Norfolk	5 September	(United Kingdom) Mike Conway	(United Kingdom) Mike Conway	(United Kingdom) Mike Conway	Fortec Motorsport
9	R18	Snetterton Circuit, Norfolk	5 September	(United Kingdom) Mike Conway	(United Kingdom) Mike Conway	(United Kingdom) Mike Conway	Fortec Motorsport
10	R19	Donington Park (National), Leicestershire	26 September	(United Kingdom) Westley Barber	(United Kingdom) Westley Barber	(United Kingdom) Westley Barber	Comtec Racing with Duckhams
10	R20	Donington Park (National), Leicestershire	26 September	(United Kingdom) Paul di Resta	(United Kingdom) James Jakes	(United Kingdom) Paul di Resta	Manor Motorsport

== Drivers' Championship ==
- Points were awarded on a 32-28-25-22-20-18-16-14-12-11-10-9-8-7-6-5-4-3-2-1 basis, with 1 point for fastest lap. A driver's 15 best results counted towards the championship.

Pos	Driver	THR		BRH		SIL		OUL		THR		CRO		KNO		BRH		SNE		DON		Pts
Pos	Driver	1	2	3	4	5	6	7	8	9	10	11	12	13	14	15	16	17	18	19	20	Pts
1	(United Kingdom) Mike Conway	**1**	**1**	4	**2**	3	**1**	2	**2**	2	1	**1**	**1**	2	4	3	2	**1**	**1**			518
2	(United Kingdom) Westley Barber	2	9	**1**	1	4	Ret	**Ret**	1	**1**	**Ret**	3	3	4	**1**	4	3	3	4	**1**	9	426
3	(United Kingdom) Paul di Resta	3	Ret	7	4	**2**	Ret	9	5	4	Ret	2	6	1	3	**1**	**1**	4	3	5	**1**	415
4	(Sweden) Alexander Storckenfeldt	6	4	6	7	1	Ret	12	9	3	4	10	5			16	9	Ret	5	4	5	286
5	(United Kingdom) Susie Stoddart	8	12	2	3	11	10	4	6	5	2	6	9	14	11	7	8	10	13	6	Ret	284
6	(Canada) Sean McIntosh	15	16	19	12	7	6	1	Ret	10	16	8	14	11	9	2	5	5	17	2	3	268
7	(United Kingdom) Stuart Hall	14	6	15	9	10	4	3	7	9	7	9	Ret	8	8	18	11	2	Ret	7	2	267
8	(United Kingdom) Oliver Jarvis	9	DNS	5	18	8	7	DNS	4	6	8	5	7	6	7	DNS	6	6	15	10	10	253
9	(United Kingdom) Charlie Hollings	11	13	3	10	12	Ret	Ret	3			4	2	16	5	8	7	11	6	DSQ	6	239
10	(South Africa) Stephen Simpson	12	8	10	Ret	6	2	5	10	7	3	7	NC	5	6	5	13	18	Ret	Ret	Ret	237
11	(United Kingdom) Joey Foster	5	3	8	6	16	5	6	Ret	8	5	Ret	13	DNS	DNS	DNS	DNS	13	Ret			170
12	(Republic of Ireland) Patrick Hogan	18	Ret	22	8	5	3	Ret	Ret	24	13	23	Ret	7	12	11	14	17	2	12	11	163
13	(United Kingdom) James Jakes	16	11	25	25	Ret	17	DNS	21	12	6	24	4	13	13	10	4	16	7	8	12	163
14	(Brazil) Gustavo Sondermann											22	12	**3**	2	6	Ret	Ret	10	Ret	4	113
15	(United Kingdom) John Byrne	7	2	11	11	9	8	16	19	15	15											109
16	(United States) Ben Freudenberg	22	15	18	19	Ret	18	7	11	22	9	12	Ret	17	10	DNS	16	14	18	Ret	15	97
17	(Mexico) Carlos Mastretta Aguilera	24	23	20	24	18	21	10	15	23	14	11	10	10	15	Ret	17	7	Ret	17	Ret	90
18	(United Kingdom) Craig Dolby	21	21	26	23	19	16	15	16	17	Ret	14	15	19	17	15	20	12	Ret	3	16	87
19	(United Kingdom) Josh Weber	10	22	28	15	13	Ret	8	Ret	14	10	13	Ret	21	22	17	19	19	22	16	14	85
20	(Brazil) Ruben Carrapatoso	4	5	14	5	Ret	9	DNS	DNS													81
21	(Venezuela) Rodolfo González	19	Ret	16	DNS	25	15			20	19	16	16	12	14	DNS	10	9	14	Ret	DNS	72
22	(China) Cheng Congfu	Ret	Ret	17	16	20	19	Ret	8	11	11	21	22	18	21	13	12					66
23	(Brazil) Patrick Rocha											Ret	8	9	23	12	Ret	8	8	Ret	DNS	63
24	(United Kingdom) Sean Edwards	DNS	19	DNS	22	14	11	11	Ret	16	Ret	18	17	20	18	Ret	18	26	19	11	Ret	60
25	(Peru) Juan Manuel Polar	25	14	13	13	NC	12	Ret	12									23	Ret	DNS	8	55
26	(United Kingdom) David Epton	13	18	9	14	Ret	13	13	13	26	Ret											54
27	(Turkey) Jason Tahinci	Ret	26	23	21	22	20	DNS	Ret	18	12	17	18	15	16	14	Ret	15	12	Ret	Ret	53
28	(United Kingdom) James Gornall	Ret	10	24	DNS	17	24	14	14	19	20	15	11									48
29	(United Kingdom) Dan Clarke															9	15	Ret	9	18	13	41
30	(Sweden) Stefan Söderberg			21	Ret	15	14													9	7	41
31	(Republic of Ireland) James Murphy	Ret	7	12	20	Ret	Ret	DNS	DNS	13	Ret											34
32	(United Kingdom) Michael Vitulli	20	27	DNS	17	21	Ret					20	19	22	19	20	Ret	21	16	14	Ret	23
33	(United Kingdom) Daniel Welch	17	20	DNS	DNS											19	Ret	20	11	20	17	23
34	(United Kingdom) Pippa Mann	Ret	25	DNS	DNS	Ret	22	DNS	17	25	17	19	20	23	20	21	21	22	Ret	19	Ret	14
35	(United Kingdom) Nik Goodfellow	26	17	DNS	Ret	23	23	DNS	18	21	18											10
36	(United Kingdom) Katherine Legge																	Ret	Ret	15	18	9
37	(Netherlands) Yelmer Buurman																			13	22	8
38	(United Kingdom) Sam Edwards																			Ret	19	2
39	(United Kingdom) Matt Russell	23	24	27	DNS	24	Ret	DNS	20	DNS	DNS	25	21	Ret	24					Ret	20	2
40	(United States) Nick Jones																	24	20	Ret	DNS	1
–	(United Kingdom) Jamie Gruber													24	Ret	22	Ret	25	21	DNS	21	0
Pos	Driver	THR		BRH		SIL		OUL		THR		CRO		KNO		BRH		SNE		DON		Pts

Colour	Result
Gold	Winner
Silver	Second place
Bronze	Third place
Green	Points classification
Blue	Non-points classification
Blue	Non-classified finish (NC)
Purple	Retired, not classified (Ret)
Red	Did not qualify (DNQ)
Red	Did not pre-qualify (DNPQ)
Black	Disqualified (DSQ)
White	Did not start (DNS)
White	Withdrew (WD)
White	Race cancelled (C)
Blank	Did not practice (DNP)
Blank	Did not arrive (DNA)
Blank	Excluded (EX)

**Bold** – Pole
Italics – Fastest Lap

== Winter Series ==
=== Teams and drivers ===
Team	No.	Driver name	Rounds
Fortec Motorsport	1	(Netherlands) Yelmer Buurman	All
Fortec Motorsport	2	(United Kingdom) Peter Rees	All
Fortec Motorsport	3	(United States) Ben Freudenburg	All
Fortec Motorsport	17	(United Kingdom) Stuart Hall	All
Team AKA	4	(Peru) Juan Manuel Polar	All
Team AKA	7	(United Kingdom) James Jakes	All
Manor Motorsport	5	(Republic of Ireland) Patrick Hogan	All
Manor Motorsport	6	(Netherlands) Bas Lammers	All
Manor Motorsport	11	(United Kingdom) Oliver Jarvis	All
Team JLR	8	(United Kingdom) Dan Clarke	All
Team JLR	9	(South Africa) Stephen Simpson	All
Team JLR	31	(United Kingdom) Craig Dolby	All
Team Nasamax	14	(United Kingdom) Dean Stirling	All
Scorpio Motorsport	22	(United Kingdom) Will Bratt	All
Mark Burdett Motorsport	21	(United Kingdom) Simon Pearson	1
Mark Burdett Motorsport	23	(Venezuela) Rodolfo González	All
Mark Burdett Motorsport	24	(United Kingdom) Chris Dent	All
Embassy Racing	77	(United Kingdom) Jody Firth	All
Vitulli Racing	88	(United Kingdom) Michael Vitulli	1-3, 6-10

=== Race calendar and results ===
Round		Circuit	Date	Pole position	Fastest lap	Winning driver	Winning team
1	R1	Pembrey, Wales	6 November	(South Africa) Stephen Simpson	(United Kingdom) Stuart Hall	(South Africa) Stephen Simpson	Team JLR
1	R2	Pembrey, Wales	6 November	(United Kingdom) Stuart Hall	(Netherlands) Yelmer Buurman	(United Kingdom) Oliver Jarvis	Manor Motorsport
2	R1	Croft Circuit, North Yorkshire	13 November	(United Kingdom) Stuart Hall	(United Kingdom) Stuart Hall	(South Africa) Stephen Simpson	Team JLR
2	R2	Croft Circuit, North Yorkshire	13 November	(United Kingdom) Stuart Hall	(United Kingdom) Stuart Hall	(United Kingdom) Stuart Hall	Fortec Motorsport

=== Drivers' Championship ===
Pos	Driver	PEM		CRO		Pts
1	(United Kingdom) Stuart Hall	2	2	3	1	119
2	(South Africa) Stephen Simpson	1	4	1	2	114
3	(United Kingdom) Oliver Jarvis	3	1	5	4	99
4	(Republic of Ireland) Patrick Hogan	7	6	2	3	87
5	(Netherlands) Yelmer Buurman	4	3	4	Ret	71
6	(United Kingdom) James Jakes	9	5	8	6	64
7	(Peru) Juan Manuel Polar	6	Ret	6	5	56
8	(Netherlands) Bas Lammers	10	8	11	7	51
9	(United States) Ben Freudenburg	13	10	9	8	45
10	(Venezuela) Rodolfo González	Ret	7	7	12	41
11	(United Kingdom) Will Bratt	11	12	12	9	40
12	(United Kingdom) Dan Clarke	5	Ret	10	Ret	31
13	(United Kingdom) Craig Dolby	8	11	14	Ret	31
14	(United Kingdom) Jody Firth	12	Ret	13	11	27
15	(United Kingdom) Simon Pearson	15	9			18
16	(United Kingdom) Peter Rees	14	NC	Ret	10	18
17	(United Kingdom) Chris Dent	17	13	Ret	Ret	12
18	(United Kingdom) Dean Stirling	16	14	Ret	Ret	12
Pos	Driver	PEM		CRO		Pts
