= 2005 Formula Renault 2.0 UK Championship =

Seasons
- ← 2004 2006 →

The 2005 Formula Renault 2.0 UK Championship was the 17th British Formula Renault Championship. The season began at Donington Park on 10 April and ended on 2 October at Donington, after twenty rounds held in England and Scotland, with all except round eight supporting the British Touring Car Championship.

== Teams and drivers ==
Team	No.	Driver name	Rounds
Fortec Motorsport	1	(United Kingdom) Stuart Hall	All
Fortec Motorsport	2	(Netherlands) Yelmer Buurman	All
Fortec Motorsport	3	(United Kingdom) James Sutton	All
Fortec Motorsport	4	(Sweden) Sebastian Hohenthal	All
Hillspeed Racing	5	(United Kingdom) Josh Weber	1–4
Hillspeed Racing	5	(United Kingdom) Zan Wilkinson	7–10
Hillspeed Racing	6	(United Kingdom) Jamie Morrow	1–2
Hillspeed Racing	6	(United Kingdom) Ali Goss	4
Hillspeed Racing	6	(United Kingdom) Joe Tanner	7
Hillspeed Racing	6	(United States) Sergey Shleikin	8–10
Team AKA	7	(United Kingdom) James Jakes	All
Team AKA	19	(United Kingdom) Chris Dent	1
Team AKA	20	(Sweden) Alexander Storkenfeldt	All
Team AKA	46	(Republic of Ireland) Emmett Queenan	1–2
Team AKA	46	(United Kingdom) Ben Hanley	5
Team AKA	46	(Turkey) Jason Tahinci	8–10
Team JLR	8	(United Kingdom) Stephen Simpson	1–6, 8–10
Team JLR	9	(United Kingdom) Tom Kimber-Smith	All
Team JLR	10	(Turkey) Jason Tahinci	1–7
Team JLR	10	(United States) Joe D'Agostini	8, 10
Team JLR	11	(United Kingdom) Jody Firth	1–6
RSR Engineering	12	(United Kingdom) Matt Shawyer	1–8
Motaworld Racing	14	(Netherlands) Dave van den Heuvel	1–3, 6–10
Etek Motorsport	15	(United Kingdom) Nick Wilcox	10
Welch Motorsport	16	(United Kingdom) Jeremy Metcalfe	1–6, 8–9
Welch Motorsport	17	(United Kingdom) Daniel Welch	1–6, 8–10
Scorpio Motorsport	18	(United Kingdom) Peter Rees	All
Scorpio Motorsport	21	(United Kingdom) Will Bratt	All
Team Firstair	22	(France) Jean-Robert Niogret	All
Team Firstair	24	(Canada) Sean McIntosh	All
Team Firstair	41	(United Kingdom) Richard Keen	3–10
Manor Motorsport	25	(Republic of Ireland) Patrick Hogan	All
Manor Motorsport	26	(Venezuela) Rodolfo González	All
Manor Motorsport	27	(United Kingdom) Oliver Jarvis	All
Manor Motorsport	28	(China) Cong Fu Cheng	1–8, 10
Mark Burdett Racing	42	(United Kingdom) Bradley Ellis	1–9
Mark Burdett Racing	77	(United Kingdom) Karl Moon	5
Mark Burdett Racing	77	(Sweden) Stefan Söderberg	6

== Race calendar and results ==
Round		Circuit	Date	Pole position	Fastest lap	Winning driver	Winning team
1	R1	Donington Park (National), Leicestershire	10 April	(Sweden) Sebastian Hohenthal	(Sweden) Sebastian Hohenthal	(Republic of Ireland) Patrick Hogan	Manor Motorsport
1	R2	Donington Park (National), Leicestershire	10 April	(Sweden) Sebastian Hohenthal	(Canada) Sean McIntosh	(Canada) Sean McIntosh	Team Firstair
2	R3	Thruxton Circuit, Hampshire	1 May	(Sweden) Alexander Storkenfeldt	(Sweden) Alexander Storkenfeldt	(Sweden) Alexander Storkenfeldt	Team AKA
2	R4	Thruxton Circuit, Hampshire	1 May	(Sweden) Alexander Storkenfeldt	(Sweden) Sebastian Hohenthal	(United Kingdom) Oliver Jarvis	Manor Motorsport
3	R5	Brands Hatch (Indy), Kent	5 June	(United Kingdom) Oliver Jarvis	(United Kingdom) James Jakes	(United Kingdom) Oliver Jarvis	Manor Motorsport
3	R6	Brands Hatch (Indy), Kent	5 June	(United Kingdom) Oliver Jarvis	(United Kingdom) James Jakes	(United Kingdom) Oliver Jarvis	Manor Motorsport
4	R7	Oulton Park (Island), Cheshire	18 June	(United Kingdom) James Jakes	(United Kingdom) Stuart Hall	(United Kingdom) Oliver Jarvis	Manor Motorsport
4	R8	Oulton Park (Island), Cheshire	19 June	(United Kingdom) Oliver Jarvis	(United Kingdom) Oliver Jarvis	(United Kingdom) Yelmer Buurman	Fortec Motorsport
5	R9	Croft Circuit, North Yorkshire	16 July	(Sweden) Alexander Storkenfeldt	(Sweden) Alexander Storkenfeldt	(Sweden) Alexander Storkenfeldt	Team AKA
5	R10	Croft Circuit, North Yorkshire	17 July	(Sweden) Alexander Storkenfeldt	(Sweden) Sebastian Hohenthal	(Sweden) Alexander Storkenfeldt	Team AKA
6	R11	Snetterton Circuit, Norfolk	6 August	(Canada) Sean McIntosh	(United Kingdom) James Jakes	(Canada) Sean McIntosh	Team Firstair
6	R12	Snetterton Circuit, Norfolk	7 August	(Canada) Sean McIntosh	(United Kingdom) James Jakes	(Canada) Sean McIntosh	Team Firstair
7	R13	Knockhill Circuit, Fife	8 August	(Canada) Sean McIntosh	(United Kingdom) Stuart Hall	(Canada) Sean McIntosh	Team Firstair
7	R14	Knockhill Circuit, Fife	8 August	(Republic of Ireland) Patrick Hogan	(United Kingdom) James Jakes	(Canada) Sean McIntosh	Comtec Racing with Duckhams
8	R15	Donington Park (GP), Leicestershire	11 September	(Netherlands) Yelmer Buurman	(Netherlands) Yelmer Buurman	(Netherlands) Yelmer Buurman	Fortec Motorsport
8	R16	Donington Park (GP), Leicestershire	11 September	(Netherlands) Yelmer Buurman	(United States) Joe D'Agostini	(United Kingdom) Oliver Jarvis	Manor Motorsport
9	R17	Silverstone Circuit (International), Northamptonshire	17 September	(Sweden) Alexander Storkenfeldt	(Republic of Ireland) Patrick Hogan	(Sweden) Alexander Storkenfeldt	Team AKA
9	R18	Silverstone Circuit (International), Northamptonshire	18 September	(Sweden) Alexander Storkenfeldt	(Sweden) Sebastian Hohenthal	(Republic of Ireland) Patrick Hogan	Manor Motorsport
10	R19	Brands Hatch (GP), Kent	1 October	(United Kingdom) James Jakes	(United Kingdom) Tom Kimber-Smith	(United Kingdom) Yelmer Buurman	Fortec Motorsport
10	R20	Brands Hatch (GP), Kent	2 October	(Canada) Sean McIntosh	(Sweden) Sebastian Hohenthal	(Sweden) Sebastian Hohenthal	Fortec Motorsport

== Drivers' Championship ==
- Points were awarded on a 32-28-25-22-20-18-16-14-12-11-10-9-8-7-6-5-4-3-2-1 basis, with 1 point for fastest lap. A driver's 18 best results counted towards the championship.

Pos	Driver	DON		THR		BRH		OUL		CRO		SNE		KNO		DON		SIL		BRH		Pts
Pos	Driver	1	2	3	4	5	6	7	8	9	10	11	12	13	14	15	16	17	18	19	20	Pts
1	(United Kingdom) Oliver Jarvis	2	2	2	1	**1**	**1**	1	**20**	2	5	7	7	8	5	3	1	Ret	2	10	3	436
2	(Canada) Sean McIntosh	6	1	4	4	15	4	4	2	Ret	6	**1**	**1**	**1**	1	5	Ret	3	4	13	**2**	417
3	(United Kingdom) James Jakes	4	6	7	8	3	2	**2**	12	9	2	4	2	4	2	4	2	7	5	**11**	4	397
4	(Sweden) Sebastian Hohenthal	**3**	**4**	3	5	4	3	5	7	8	3	19	4	6	4	2	7	Ret	21	4	1	382
5	(Netherlands) Yelmer Buurman	8	Ret	6	9	5	8	Ret	1	7	7	6	8	2	3	**1**	**4**	6	6	1	6	359
6	(Sweden) Alexander Storckenfeldt	7	Ret	**1**	**2**	Ret	6	Ret	14	**1**	**1**	8	22	10	6	7	10	**1**	**3**	2	8	337
7	(Republic of Ireland) Patrick Hogan	1	5	8	6	2	Ret	10	9	4	4	2	6	20	**7**	10	12	4	1	9	12	329
8	(United Kingdom) Stuart Hall	5	3	11	11	9	9	6	5	3	9	3	5	5	9	9	3	2	20	9	11	316
9	(Venezuela) Rodolfo González	13	9	5	7	6	7	3	18	5	8	10	9	9	10	DSQ	18	10	10	8	Ret	334
10	(South Africa) Stephen Simpson	9	Ret	Ret	3	8	5	Ret	Ret	6	Ret	5	3			19	5	8	7	3	5	231
11	(China) Cong Fu Cheng	11	11	12	18	7	11	8	4	13	12	9	10	3	8	Ret	9			5	9	217
12	(United Kingdom) Tom Kimber-Smith	10	7	9	10	Ret	10	13	3	10	13	11	11	11	Ret	18	8	5	15	6	Ret	204
13	(United Kingdom) James Sutton	12	13	Ret	15	13	13	9	8	12	DNS	12	21	7	11	8	16	9	12	12	7	274
14	(United Kingdom) Richard Keen					10	12	7	6	18	15	Ret	12	Ret	DNS	6	6	Ret	8	Ret	13	127
15	(United Kingdom) Will Bratt	21	14	14	17	19	15	12	11	14	Ret	20	15	13	Ret	12	19	11	16	Ret	19	79
16	(United Kingdom) Daniel Welch	17	Ret	10	12	23	Ret	Ret	10	Ret	16	Ret	14			11	13	Ret	9	14	Ret	84
17	(United Kingdom) Matt Shawyer	16	8	Ret	21	14	14	11	Ret	Ret	11	Ret	13	16	Ret	14	24					73
18	(United Kingdom) Peter Rees	Ret	17	21	Ret	20	Ret	16	14	15	Ret	16	19	18	14	13	17	13	Ret	Ret	14	67
19	(France) Jean-Robert Niogret	23	20	19	23	16	16	Ret	16	20	14	18	16	12	Ret	22	11	12	Ret	17	Ret	66
20	(Turkey) Jason Tahinci	22	19	Ret	14	17	19	15	Ret	16	Ret	15	18	19	16	17	14	Ret	11	19	20	66
21	(United Kingdom) Bradley Ellis	18	18	13	19	18	21	Ret	13	Ret	17	Ret	17	17	Ret	Ret	15	16	13			58
22	(United Kingdom) Zan Wilkinson													14	13	15	21	15	17	16	15	42
23	(United Kingdom) Josh Weber	14	12	Ret	13	12	Ret	14	Ret													40
24	(United Kingdom) Jeremy Metcalfe	24	Ret	20	25	21	17	17	17	17	19	17	20			16	20	Ret	14			36
25	(Netherlands) Dave van den Heuvel	25	16	17	24	22	20					14	Ret	Ret	15	21	23	14	19	Ret	17	36
26	(United Kingdom) Jody Firth	20	Ret	18	22	11	18	19	Ret	19	Ret	13	Ret									29
27	(Republic of Ireland) Emmett Queenan	15	10	15	16																	28
28	(United Kingdom) Ben Hanley									11	10											21
29	(United States) Joe D'Agostini															20	25			15	10	20
30	(United Kingdom) Joe Tanner													15	12							15
31	(United States) Sergey Shleikin															Ret	21	Ret	18	18	18	9
32	(United Kingdom) Chris Dent	19	15																			8
33	(United Kingdom) Jamie Morrow	Ret	DNS	16	20																	6
34	(United Kingdom) Nick Wilcox																			Ret	16	5
35	(United Kingdom) Ali Goss							18	19													5
36	(United Kingdom) Karl Moon									21	18											3
–	(Sweden) Stefan Söderberg											Ret	Ret									0
Pos	Driver	DON		THR		BRH		OUL		CRO		SNE		KNO		DON		SIL		BRH		Pts

Colour	Result
Gold	Winner
Silver	Second place
Bronze	Third place
Green	Points classification
Blue	Non-points classification
Blue	Non-classified finish (NC)
Purple	Retired, not classified (Ret)
Red	Did not qualify (DNQ)
Red	Did not pre-qualify (DNPQ)
Black	Disqualified (DSQ)
White	Did not start (DNS)
White	Withdrew (WD)
White	Race cancelled (C)
Blank	Did not practice (DNP)
Blank	Did not arrive (DNA)
Blank	Excluded (EX)

**Bold** – Pole
Italics – Fastest Lap
