= Juan Manuel Polar =

Peruvian racing driver

- Nationality: Peruvian
- Born: September 24, 1983 (age 43) Lima, Peru

Previous series
- 2008 2005-2007 2003-2004 2002 2001 2000-2001: Indy Lights; Spanish Formula Three Championship; Formula Renault 2.0 UK; Formula Renault 2.0 Mexico; Formula Dodge National Championship; Formula Dodge Southern Series

Juan Manuel Polar (born 24 September 1983 in Lima) is a racing driver from Peru. He has previously competed in the Indy Lights, Spanish Formula Three Championship and Formula Renault among other series.

== Career ==
Polar started his autoracing career in 2000 in the Skip Barber Formula Dodge Southern Race Series. At Sebring International Raceway the Peruvian won his first ever autorace. He ran ten races in the series, winning four races and ended on the podium eight times eventually being classified seventh in the championship. In 2001, Polar competed in the inaugural Formula Dodge National Championship. At Sebring Polar won his only race in the series. He beat Júlio Campos and A. J. Allmendinger. In 2001, he also competed at the opening round of the 2001 Barber Dodge Pro Series season. At Sebring, he qualified thirteenth but failed to finish after making contact.

For 2002, Polar moved into Formula Renault, firstly the Mexican championship and in 2003 the British championship. In the British championship. His best result was an eleventh place at the season finale at Oulton Park. In the first four rounds of the 2004 British Formula Renault championship, Polar raced for Mark Burdett Motorsport. In the last two rounds of the championship, he raced for Team AKA. At Donington Park, Polar finished eighth, which moved him up the championship standings landing him the 25th place.

In 2005, Polar moved up the racing ladder towards the Spanish Formula Three Championship. He was signed by IGI Tec-Auto but later transferred to ECA Racing. At ECA Racing, Polar finished third during the season finale at Circuit de Barcelona-Catalunya. The following season Polar drove in the Copa-class of the Spanish Formula Three Championship. Polar scored four class victories and was placed second in the championship, behind Germán Sánchez. In 2007 he was again placed second in the Copa class, this time behind Thor-Christian Ebbesvik.

For 2008, Polar returned to the United States of America to race in the Indy Lights. He was first signed by Brian Stewart Racing. At Kansas Speedway, Polar was replaced by Wade Cunningham which left Polar without a ride for the remainder of the season. He rejoined the field at Sonoma Raceway with Guthrie Racing.

After the 2008 season, Polar returned to his home country. He continues racing in his national TC2000 series.

== Motorsports results ==
=== American Open-Wheel racing results ===
(key) (Races in bold indicate pole position, races in italics indicate fastest race lap)

==== Barber Dodge Pro Series ====
Year	1	2	3	4	5	6	7	8	9	10	11	12	Rank	Points
2001	SEB; 19	PIR	LRP1	LRP2	DET	CLE	TOR	CHI	MOH	ROA	VAN	LS	**31st**	**0**
2003	STP	MTY; 14	MIL	LAG	POR	CLE	TOR	VAN	MOH	MTL			**30th**	**2**

=== Indy Lights results ===
Year	Team	1	2	3	4	5	6	7	8	9	10	11	12	13	14	15	16	Rank	Points	Ref
2008	Brian Stewart Racing	HMS; 14	STP1; 9	STP2; 7	KAN; DNS	INDY	MIL	IOW	WGL1	WGL2	NSH	MOH1	MOH2	KTY				**26th**	**100**	
2008	Guthrie Racing														SNM1; 15	SNM2; 12	CHI	**26th**	**100**	
