= Sean McIntosh =

Canadian racing driver (born 1985)

- Nationality: (Canada) Canadian
- Born: 21 May 1985 (age 41) Maple Ridge, British Columbia, Canada

A1 Grand Prix
- Years active: 2005–2007
- Teams: A1 Team Canada
- Starts: 24
- Wins: 1
- Podiums: 2
- Poles: 0
- Fastest laps: 0
- Best finish: 11th in 2005–06 and 2006–07

Formula Renault 3.5 Series
- Years active: 2006
- Teams: KTR
- Starts: 16
- Wins: 0
- Podiums: 2
- Poles: 1
- Fastest laps: 0
- Best finish: 6th in 2006

Previous series
- 2004–2005 2002–2003 2001–2002: Formula Renault 2.0 UK; North American Fran-Am 2000; USF2000 Championship

Sean McIntosh (born 21 May 1985) is a Canadian businessman and former racing driver. He scored one A1 Grand Prix victory at Sentul in 2005–06, and placed sixth in the Formula Renault 3.5 Series with two podiums and one pole position.

== Career ==
McIntosh began his single-seater career in 2001, competing in the US F2000 National Championship. Returning to the series the following year, McIntosh took two pole positions and a best result of second at Mid-Ohio to end the year fifth in points. In parallel, McIntosh also competed in North American Fran-Am 2000 Pro Championship, taking a lone win at Vancouver to take fourth in points. In 2003, McIntosh primarily competed in the Fran-Am championship, before making his European debut by joining Team Firstair in the end-of-year Formula Renault 2.0 UK Championship Winter Series.

Moving to Europe full-time in 2004, McIntosh continued with Team Firstair for his rookie season in the Formula Renault 2.0 UK Championship. After a quiet start, McIntosh scored a breakthrough win at Oulton Park, later adding three more podiums between Brands Hatch and Donington to end the year sixth overall and secure the Graduate Cup title. Continuing with Team Firstair for 2005, McIntosh won once at Donington Park and swept the Snetterton and Knockhill rounds en route to runner-up honours in the standings, behind Oliver Jarvis.

In late 2005, McIntosh joined A1 Team Canada to represent his home country in the inaugural season of the A1 Grand Prix. After scoring his first podium at the Lausitzring, McIntosh took his only series win at Sentul, his final race start before he passed the baton to Patrick Carpentier, and helped the team finish 11th in points. For the rest of 2006, McIntosh joined KTR to compete in the Formula Renault 3.5 Series. In his debut season, McIntosh took second at Spa and third at Barcelona from pole position to finish sixth in the overall standings. Towards the end of the year, McIntosh returned to A1 Grand Prix for select rounds of the 2006–07 season. Taking turns with James Hinchcliffe, McIntosh had a best result of fifth at Sepang, helping Canada finish 11th again.

Following that, McIntosh took a lengthy hiatus from the sport before racing at the 2010 24 Hours of Daytona in a Bullet Racing–run Porsche 911 GT3 Cup. McIntosh then made a one-off appearance in the GS class of the 2011 Continental Tire Sports Car Challenge for Racers Edge Motorsports at Homestead–Miami. Eight years after his last competitive race, McIntosh began competing in Club events in British Columbia, primarily competing in the Avion RS1 Series until 2022.

== Business ventures ==
After leaving competitive motorsports, McIntosh began rising through the ranks at his family business Kirmac Automotive Collision Systems, eventually becoming the company's president in 2021.

== Karting record ==
=== Karting career summary ===
Season	Series	Team	Position
2001	Formula Winter Tour – Formula S1		22nd

== Racing record ==
=== Racing career summary ===
Season	Series	Team	Races	Wins	Poles	F/Laps	Podiums	Points	Position
2001	US F2000 National Championship		4	0	0	0	0		
2001	SCCA San Francisco Region Formula Continental							26	10th
2002	US F2000 National Championship		14	0	2	0	2	195	5th
2002	North American Fran-Am 2000 Pro Championship	Phillips Motorsports	6	1	0	0	2	78	4th
2003	North American Fran-Am 2000 Pro Championship							137	11th
2003	Formula Renault 2.0 UK Championship Winter Series	Team Firstair	4	0	0	0	0	28	11th
2004	Formula Renault 2.0 UK Championship	Team Firstair	20	1	0	1	4	268	6th
2005	Formula Renault 2.0 UK Championship	Team Firstair	20	5	4	1	7	417	**2nd**
2005–06	A1 Grand Prix	A1 Team Canada	16	1	0	0	2	59‡	11th‡
2006	Formula Renault 3.5 Series	KTR	16	0	1	0	2	63	6th
2006–07	A1 Grand Prix	A1 Team Canada	8	0	0	0	0	33‡	11th‡
2010	Rolex Sports Car Series – GT	Bullet Racing	1	0	0	0	0	18	54th
2011	Continental Tire Sports Car Challenge – GS	Racers Edge Motorsports	1	0	0	0	0	7	76th

* Season still in progress.
^{†} As McIntosh was a guest driver, he was ineligible for points.
^{‡} Team standings.

=== Complete Formula Renault 2.0 UK results ===
(key)

Year	Team	1	2	3	4	5	6	7	8	9	10	11	12	13	14	15	16	17	18	19	20	Pos	Points
2004	Team Firstair	THR; 1; 15	THR; 2; 16	BRH; 1; 19	BRH; 2; 12	SIL; 1; 7	SIL; 2; 6	OUL; 1; 1	OUL; 2 Ret	THR; 1; 10	THR; 2; 16	CRO; 1; 8	CRO; 2; 14	KNO; 1; 11	KNO; 2; 9	BRH; 1; 2	BRH; 2; 5	SNE; 1; 5	SNE; 2; 17	DON; 1; 2	DON; 2; 3	6th	268
2005	Team Firstair	DON; 1; 6	DON; 2; 1	THR; 1; 4	THR; 2; 4	BRH; 1; 15	BRH; 2; 4	OUL; 1; 4	OUL; 2; 2	CRO; 1 Ret	CRO; 2; 6	**SNE**; **1**; 1	**SNE**; **2**; 1	**KNO**; **1**; 1	KNO; 2; 1	DON; 1; 5	DON; 2 Ret	SIL; 1; 3	SIL; 2; 4	BRH; 1; 13	**BRH**; **2**; 2	2nd	417

=== Complete A1 Grand Prix results ===
(Races in bold indicate pole position) (Races in italics indicate fastest lap)

A1 Grand Prix results
Year	Entrant	1	2	3	4	5	6	7	8	9	10	11	12	13	14	15	16	17	18	19	20	21	22	DC	Points
2005–06	Canada	GBR; SPR; 19	GBR; FEA; 9	GER; SPR; 7	GER; FEA; 3	POR; SPR; 7	POR; FEA; Ret	AUS; SPR; 9	AUS; FEA; Ret	MYS; SPR; 15	MYS; FEA; Ret	UAE; SPR; 5	UAE; FEA; 6	RSA; SPR; 12	RSA; FEA; 10	IDN; SPR; Ret	IDN; FEA; 1	MEX; SPR	MEX; FEA	USA; SPR	USA; FEA	CHN; SPR	CHN; FEA	11th	59
2006–07	Canada	NED; SPR	NED; FEA	CZE; SPR	CZE; FEA	CHN; SPR	CHN; FEA	MYS; SPR; 8	MYS; FEA; 5	IDN; SPR; 8	IDN; FEA; Ret	NZL; SPR	NZL; FEA	AUS; SPR	AUS; FEA	RSA; SPR	RSA; FEA	MEX; SPR	MEX; FEA	CHN; SPR; Ret	CHN; FEA; 6	GBR; SPR; 10	GBR; FEA; 12	11th	33

=== Complete Formula Renault 3.5 Series results ===
(key) (Races in bold indicate pole position) (Races in italics indicate fastest lap)

Year	Entrant	1	2	3	4	5	6	7	8	9	10	11	12	13	14	15	16	17	DC	Points
2006	KTR	ZOL; 1; 25†	ZOL; 2 DNQ	MON; 11	IST; 1; 4	IST; 2; 6	MIS; 1 Ret	MIS; 2; 10	SPA; 1; 2	SPA; 2 Ret	NÜR; 1; 7	NÜR; 2; 4	DON; 1; 5	DON; 2; 13	LMS; 1; 9	LMS; 2 Ret	CAT; 1; 5	**CAT**; **2**; 3	6th	63

^{†} McIntosh did not finish the race, but was classified as he completed more than 90% of the race distance.

=== Complete Grand-Am Rolex Sports Car Series results ===
(key) (Races in bold indicate pole position; results in italics indicate fastest lap)

Year	Team	Class	Make	Engine	1	2	3	4	5	6	7	8	9	10	11	12	Rank	Points
2010	Bullet Racing	GT	Porsche 911 GT3 Cup	Porsche 4.0L F6	DAY; 13	MIA	BAR	VIR	LIM	WGL	MOH	DAY	NJMP	WGL	CGV	MIL	54th	18
