= Cheng Congfu =

Chinese racing driver (born 1984)

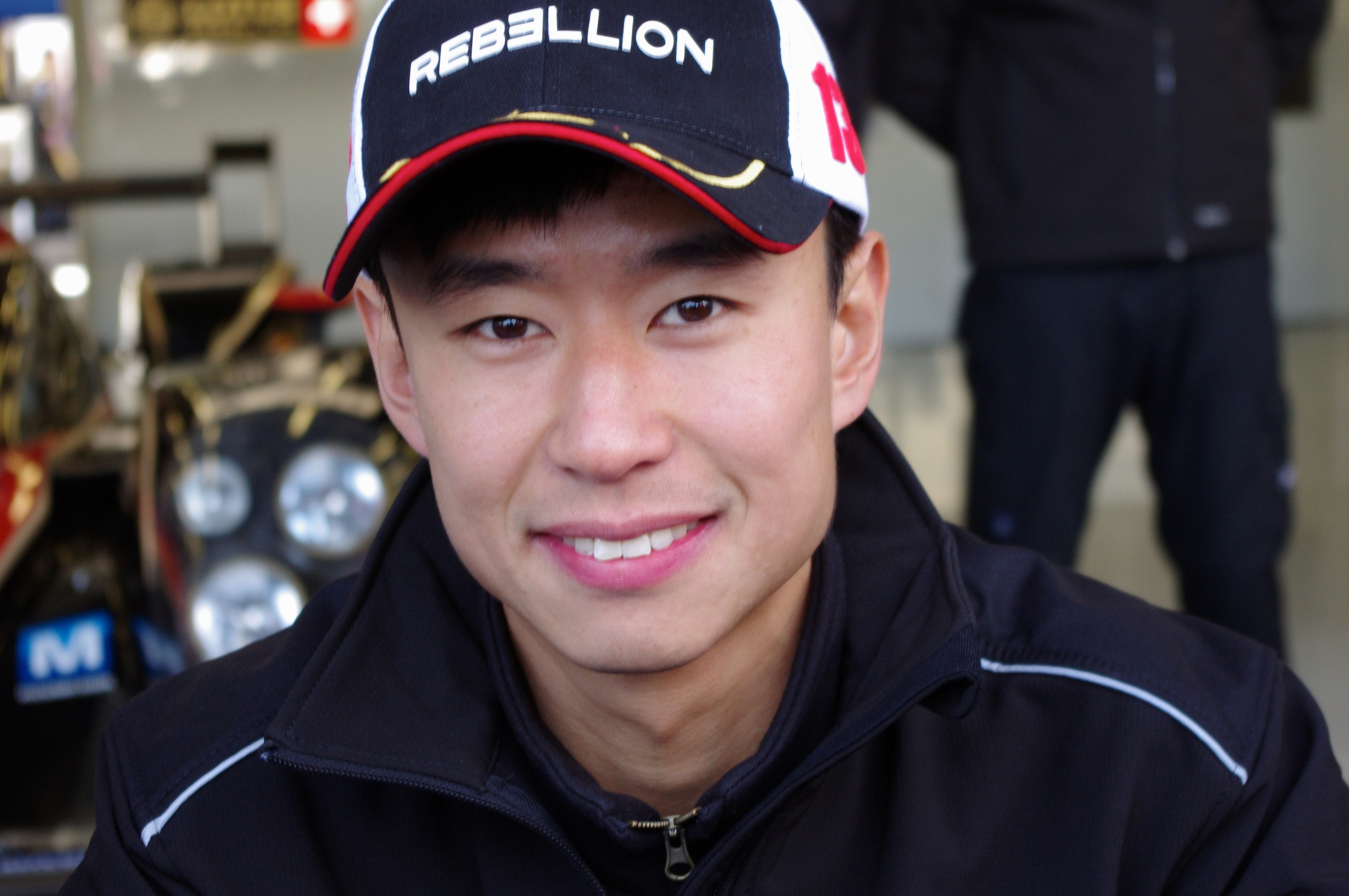
- Cheng during the 2013 6 Hours of Silverstone
- Nationality: (China) Chinese
- Born: August 15, 1984 (age 42) Beijing, China
- Education: High School Affiliated to Renmin University of China
- Categorisation: FIA Gold (until 2017); FIA Silver (2018–)

Previous series
- 2008 2007 2006–07–2008–09 2006 2005 2003–06 2003 2002 2001: Formula Three Euroseries; British Formula Three; A1 Grand Prix; Formula Renault 2.0 France; FR2.0 UK Winter Series; Formula Renault 2.0 UK; Chinese Formula Renault; Asian Formula Renault; British Formula Ford

Championship titles
- 2002: Asian Formula Renault

Cheng "Frankie" Congfu (程丛夫; pinyin: Chéng Cóng Fū; born August 15, 1984) is a Chinese racing driver.

== Career ==
=== Karting ===
In 1996, Cheng raced in karting in China, winning the national championship in 1998 (junior division), 2000 and 2001. He also took part in the European Karting Open (15th in 1999) and the Asian Karting Championship (runner-up in 2001).

- 1996 : 1st in Beijing Shunxiang Cup Karting Competition
- 1997 : 1st in Beijing Shunxiang Cup Karting Competition; 2nd in Beijing Zhuangzhou Karting
- 1998 : 1st in Beijing Karting Championship; 1st in China Karting Championship Junior division; Macau Kart Racing Club; 1st in Xiangmihu Kart Racing Club
- 1999 : 15th in European Karting Open; 2nd in China Karting Championship; 1st in Macao Karting Championship; 1st in Ericsson Masters Cup Challenge in Hong Kong
- 2000 : 1st in China Karting Championship; 1st in Ericsson Masters Cup Challenge in Hong Kong
- 2001 : 1st in All-China Karting Championship; 2nd in Asia Karting Championship

=== Racing career ===
Cheng started his formula racing career with the British Formula Ford Winter Series in 2001. In 2003, he would be supported by the McLaren Formula One team, as part of its driver development programme.

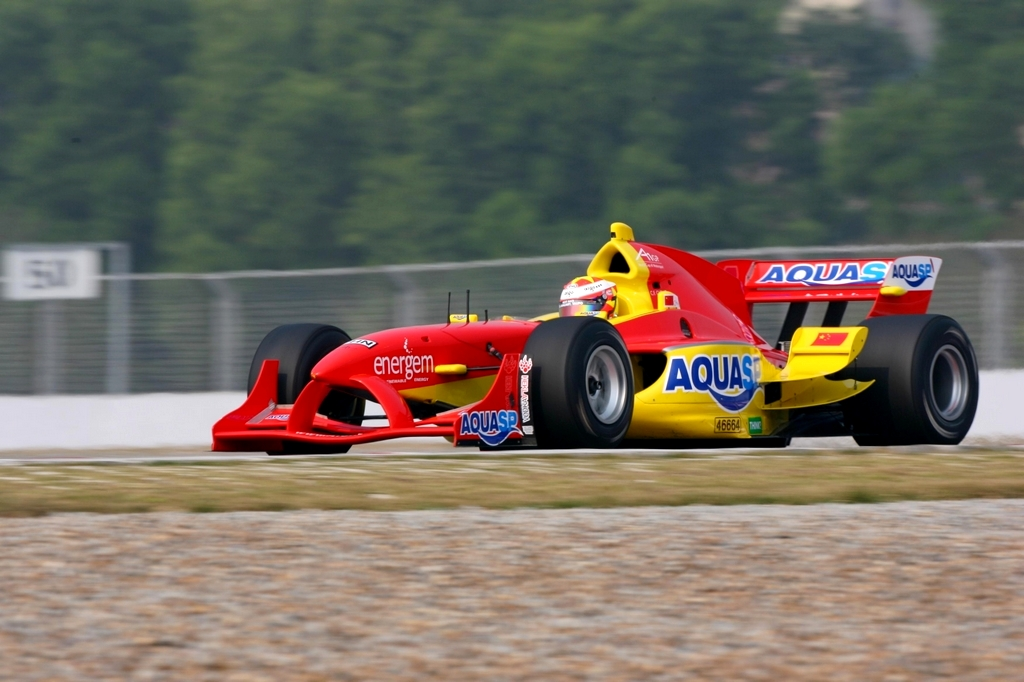
Cheng driving for A1 Team China at Zhuhai in 2007.

Cheng joined A1 Team China and drove in the A1 Grand Prix series from the 2006-07 season in the 2008-09 season.

Cheng raced in the Formula Three Euroseries for 2008.

Cheng became the first Chinese driver to participate, finish and score a class podium in the 24 Hours of Le Mans when his Saulnier Team LMP2 Pescarolo finished third in the LMP2 class of the 2008 event, behind the teams of van Merksteijn and Team Essex, both running Porsche Spyder LMP2s.

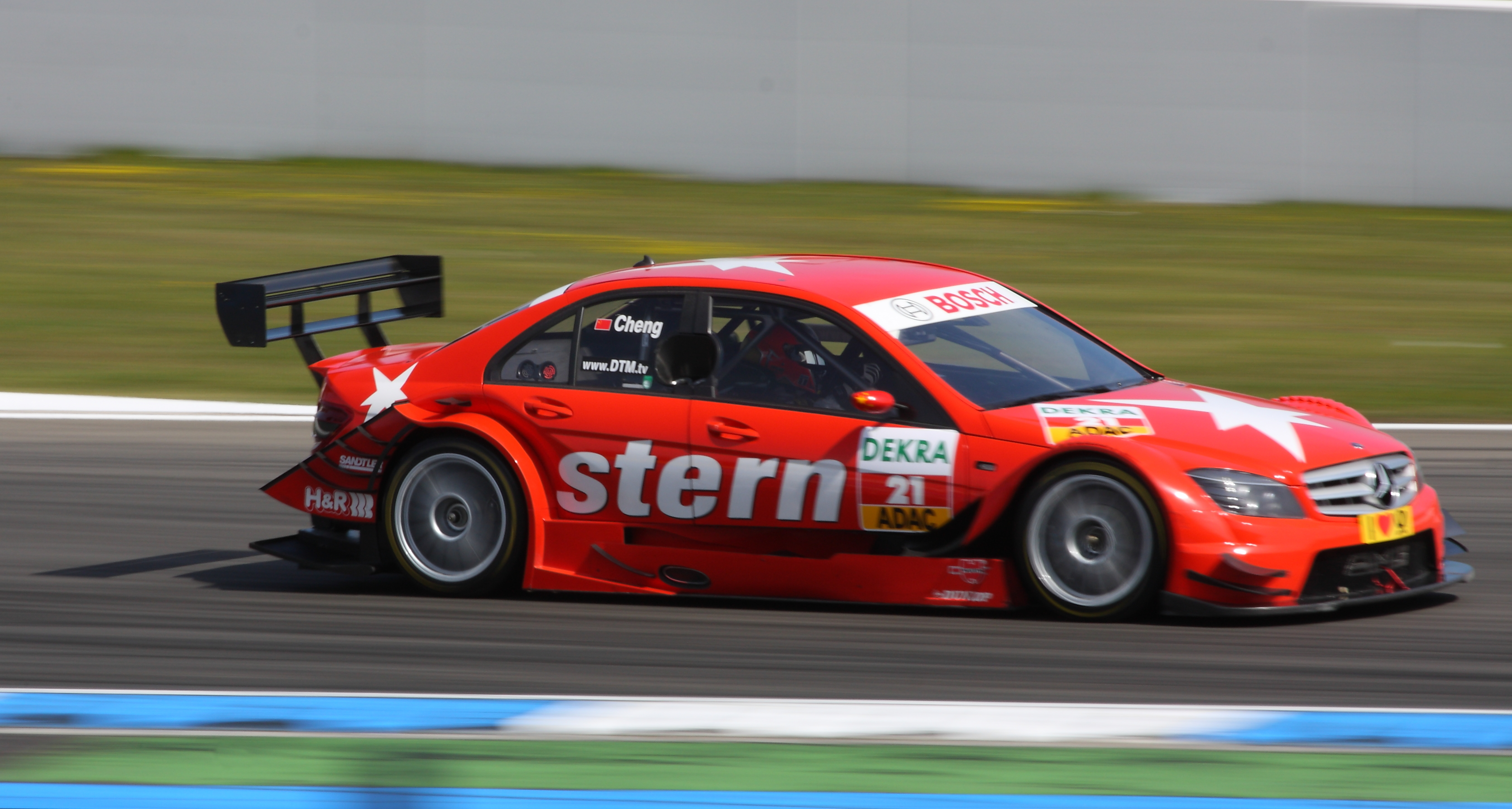
Cheng made his DTM début at Hockenheim in 2010.

On 23–24 May 2009, Cheng participated in the ADAC Nurburgring 24 Hours, with teammates Altfrid Heger, Carlo van Dam, and Franck Mailleux in VW Motorsport III's #116 VW Scirocco GT 24 (4 cyl, 1.984 ccm, 1100 kg), the team finished 20th overall and third in SP3T class after Volkswagen Motorsport II's #118 VW Scirocco GT 24 and #107 Audi A3. Cheng Congfu then became the first Chinese driver to participate, finish and score a class podium in the Nurburgring 24 Hours.

Cheng drove in the 2010 Deutsche Tourenwagen Masters for Mercedes, becoming the second Asian driver – after Japan's Katsutomo Kaneishi in 2003 – to drive in the series.

In November 2011, Cheng partnered with 1998 and 1999 F1 World Champion Mika Häkkinen and Lance David Arnold to drive a Mercedes-Benz SLS AMG at the 2011 6 Hours of Zhuhai race, a round of the 2011 Intercontinental Le Mans Cup.

== Racing record ==
=== Racing career summary ===
Season	Series	Team	Races	Wins	Poles	F/Laps	Podiums	Points	Position
2003	Formula Renault 2.0 UK Championship	Hill Speed Racing	9	0	0	0	0	19	30th
2004	Formula Renault 2.0 UK Championship	Manor Motorsport	16	0	0	0	0	66	22nd
2005	Formula Renault 2.0 UK Championship	Manor Motorsport	18	0	0	0	1	217	11th
2005	Formula Renault 2.0 UK Winter Series	Manor Motorsport	4	1	2	1	3	101	**2nd**
2006	Formula Renault 2.0 UK Championship	Manor Motorsport	20	0	1	0	8	374	**3rd**
2006	French Formula Renault 2.0	Manor Motorsport	2	0	0	0	0	0	34th
2006-07	A1 Grand Prix	A1 Team China	12	0	0	0	0	22‡	15th‡
2007	British Formula 3 International Series - National	Performance Racing Europe AB	20	5	4	8	15	267	**2nd**
2007	Masters of Formula 3	Manor Motorsport	1	0	0	0	0	N/A	19th
2007-08	A1 Grand Prix	A1 Team China	20	0	0	4	1	55‡	13th‡
2008	Formula 3 Euro Series	RC Motorsport powered by Volkswagen	16	0	0	0	0	0	29th
2008	Macau Grand Prix	Signature-Plus	2	0	0	0	0	N/A	13th
2008	24 Hours of Le Mans - LMP2	Saulnier Racing	1	0	0	0	1	N/A	**3rd**
2008-09	A1 Grand Prix	A1 Team China	4	0	0	0	0	7‡	18th‡
2009	24 Hours of Nürburgring - SP3T	Volkswagen Motorsport	1	0	0	0	1	N/A	**3rd**
2010	Deutsche Tourenwagen Masters	Persson Motorsport	11	0	0	0	0	0	17th
2012	FIA World Endurance Championship	Rebellion Racing	1	0	0	0	0	12	24th
2012	Blancpain Endurance Series - Pro	Black Falcon	2	0	0	0	1	18	18th
2013	FIA World Endurance Championship	Rebellion Racing	3	0	0	0	0	17	18th
2013	24 Hours of Le Mans - LMP1	Rebellion Racing	1	0	0	0	0	N/A	8th
2013	American Le Mans Series - P1	Rebellion Racing	1	0	0	0	0	0	NC
2013	Asian Le Mans Series	OAK Racing	1	0	1	1	1	19	9th
2013	GT Asia Series - GT3	Team R8 LMS Ultra	4	0	0	0	0	43	12th
2013	Audi R8 LMS Cup China	Audi Ultra Team	9	0	0	1	5	98	5th
2014	Blancpain Endurance Series - Pro	Brothers Racing Team	3	0	0	0	0	16	21st
2014	Audi R8 LMS Cup China	Audi R8 LMS Cup Team	12	2	1	0	4	130	4th
2015	Audi R8 LMS Cup China	FAW-VW Audi Racing Team	11	0	0	0	7	160	**2nd**
2015	24 Hours of Nürburgring - SP9	Audi Race Experience	1	0	0	0	0	N/A	12th
2016	GT Asia Series - GT3	Absolute Racing	4	0	0	0	0	13	19th
2016	FIA GT World Cup	Absolute Racing	2	0	0	0	0	N/A	10th
2016	Audi R8 LMS Cup China	FAW-VW Audi Racing Team	12	0	0	0	0	70	7th
2016	24 Hours of Nürburgring - SP9	Audi Race Experience	1	0	0	0	0	N/A	DNF
2016-17	Asian Le Mans Series - GT	Absolute Racing	1	0	0	0	0	10	14th
2017	Blancpain GT Series Asia - GT3	Milestone Racing	11	0	0	0	0	15	25th
2017	Audi R8 LMS Cup	FAW-VW Audi Racing Team	10	1	1	0	3	127	**3rd**
2018	Blancpain GT Series Asia - GT3	Absolute Racing	12	1	1	0	3	116	4th
2018	GT Asia Series - GT3	Absolute Racing	4	0	1	0	2	0	NC†
2018	Audi R8 LMS Cup	Hard Memory Hero Super Car Team	2	0	0	0	0	0	NC†
2019	Blancpain GT World Challenge Asia - GT3	Audi Sport Asia Team Absolute Racing	12	0	0	0	0	4	36th
2023	GT World Challenge Asia - GT3	Audi Sport Asia Team Absolute	12	0	0	0	0	18	25th
2023	FIA GT World Cup	FAW Audi Racing Team	1	0	0	0	0	N/A	13th
2024	GT World Challenge Asia	FAW Audi Sport Asia Racing Team	12	1	1	?	4	98	4th
2025	GT World Challenge Asia	FAW Audi Sport Asia Team Phantom	12	1	2	0	2	80	8th
2026	GT World Challenge Asia	FAW Audi Sport Asia Team Phantom	12	2	0	1	4	107	6th

† Guest driver ineligible to score points

‡ Teams' Standings

=== Complete A1 Grand Prix results ===
(key) (Races in bold indicate pole position) (Races in italics indicate fastest lap)

Year	Entrant	1	2	3	4	5	6	7	8	9	10	11	12	13	14	15	16	17	18	19	20	21	22	DC	Points
2006–07	A1 Team China	NED; SPR; 11	NED; FEA; 9	CZE; SPR; 4	CZE; FEA; 8	BEI; SPR; 13	BEI; FEA; Ret	MYS; SPR; 10	MYS; FEA; 16	IDN; SPR	IDN; FEA	NZL; SPR	NZL; FEA	AUS; SPR	AUS; FEA	RSA; SPR	RSA; FEA	MEX; SPR	MEX; FEA	SHA; SPR; 11	SHA; FEA; 15	GBR; SPR; Ret	GBR; FEA; 10	15th	22
2007–08	A1 Team China	NED; SPR; 17	NED; FEA; 15	CZE; SPR; 10	CZE; FEA; 4	MYS; SPR; Ret	MYS; FEA; 5	ZHU; SPR; 3	ZHU; FEA; 9	NZL; SPR; 14	NZL; FEA; Ret	AUS; SPR; 14	AUS; FEA; 10	RSA; SPR; 4	RSA; FEA; 6	MEX; SPR; 17	MEX; FEA; 10	SHA; SPR; 10	SHA; FEA; 15	GBR; SPR; 21	GBR; FEA; 4			13th	55
2008–09	A1 Team China	NED; SPR	NED; FEA	CHI; SPR	CHI; FEA	MYS; SPR	MYS; FEA	NZL; SPR; Ret	NZL; FEA; 14	RSA; SPR	RSA; FEA	POR; SPR	POR; FEA	GBR; SPR; 14	GBR; FEA; Ret									18th	7

=== Complete DTM results ===
(key)

Year	Team	Car	1	2	3	4	5	6	7	8	9	10	11	Pos	Points
2010	Persson Motorsport	AMG-Mercedes C-Klasse 2008	HOC; 13	VAL; 12	LAU; 12	NOR; 14	NÜR; 12	ZAN; 16	BRH; 13	OSC; Ret	HOC; Ret	ADR; 13	SHA; 15	17th	0

=== 24 Hours of Le Mans results ===
Year	Team	Co-Drivers	Car	Class	Laps	Pos.	Class Pos.
2008	(France) Saulnier Racing	(France) Pierre Ragues (France) Matthieu Lahaye	Pescarolo 01-Judd	LMP2	333	18th	**3rd**
2013	(Switzerland) Rebellion Racing	(Switzerland) Mathias Beche (Italy) Andrea Belicchi	Lola B12/60-Toyota	LMP1	275	40th	8th
