= Daniel Welch (racing driver) =

British racing driver (born 1982)

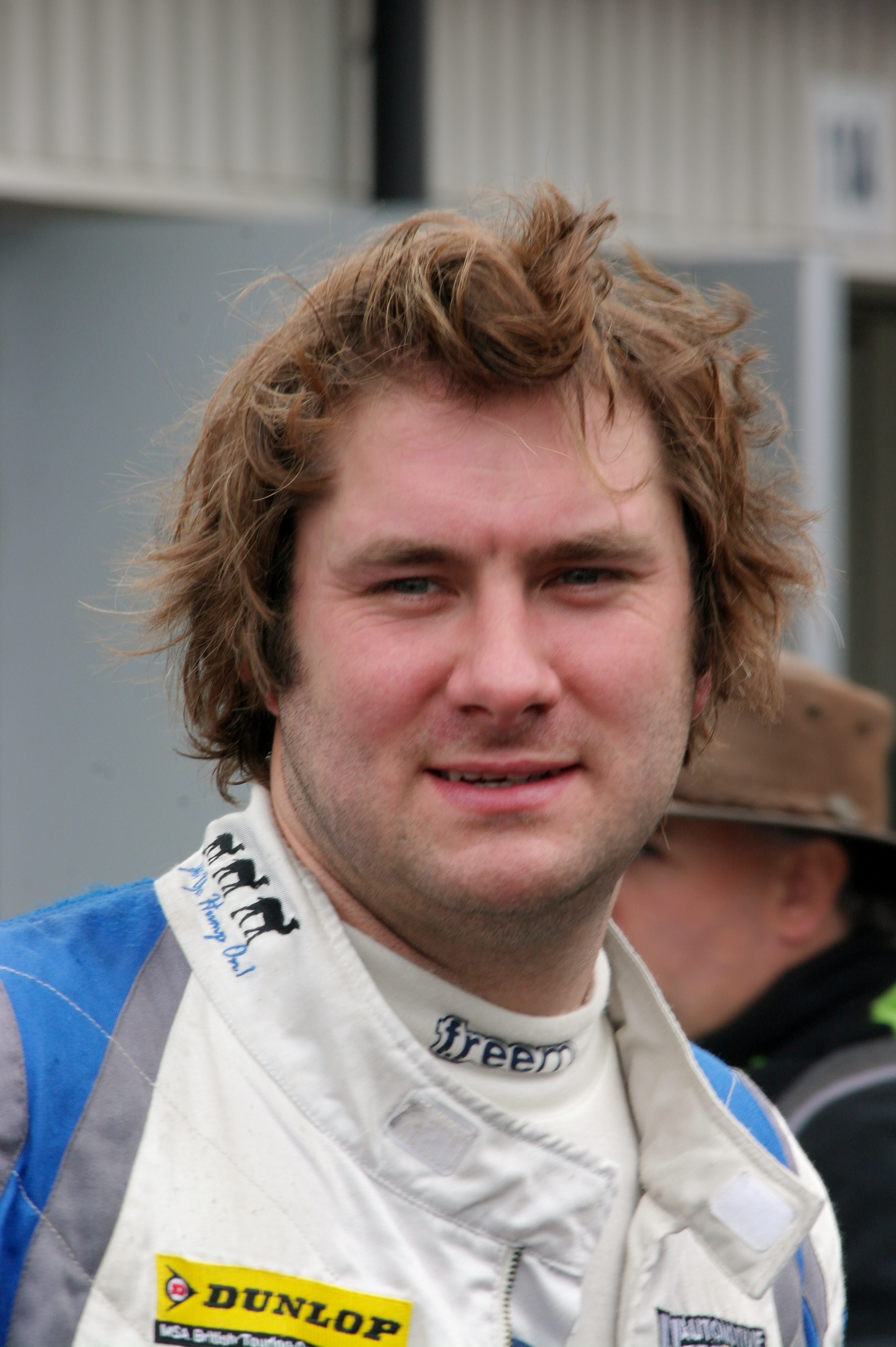
- Welch at the Silverstone round of the 2013 British Touring Car Championship season.
- Nationality: (United Kingdom) British
- Born: Daniel John Welch; 17 July 1982 (age 44) Aldershot, England

British Touring Car Championship career
- Debut season: 2011
- Current team: Trade Price Cars with Brisky Racing
- Car number: 17
- Former teams: Welch Motorsport
- Starts: 143
- Wins: 0
- Poles: 0
- Fastest laps: 0
- Best finish: 15th in 2012

Previous series
- 2010 2010 2009–2010 2009 2007–2008 2001–2006: Britcar 24hr SEAT León Supercopa; SEAT León Eurocup; Ginetta G50 Cup; SEAT Cupra Championship; Formula Renault UK

Daniel John Welch (born 17 July 1982) is a British racing driver. During his career he has mostly driven for his family team, Welch Motorsport. He drove in the British Touring Car Championship from 2011 to 2016. He is the son of former British rallycross driver John Welch.

== Racing career ==
Born in Aldershot, Hampshire, Welch first began racing in the Formula Renault UK series, but never completed a full season. In 2007, he switched to tin tops, racing in the SEAT Cupra Championship. He raced SEATs for the next few years in several one-make championships, taking two wins in the British SEAT Cupra Championship.

=== British Touring Car Championship ===
==== Welch Motorsport (2011–2016) ====
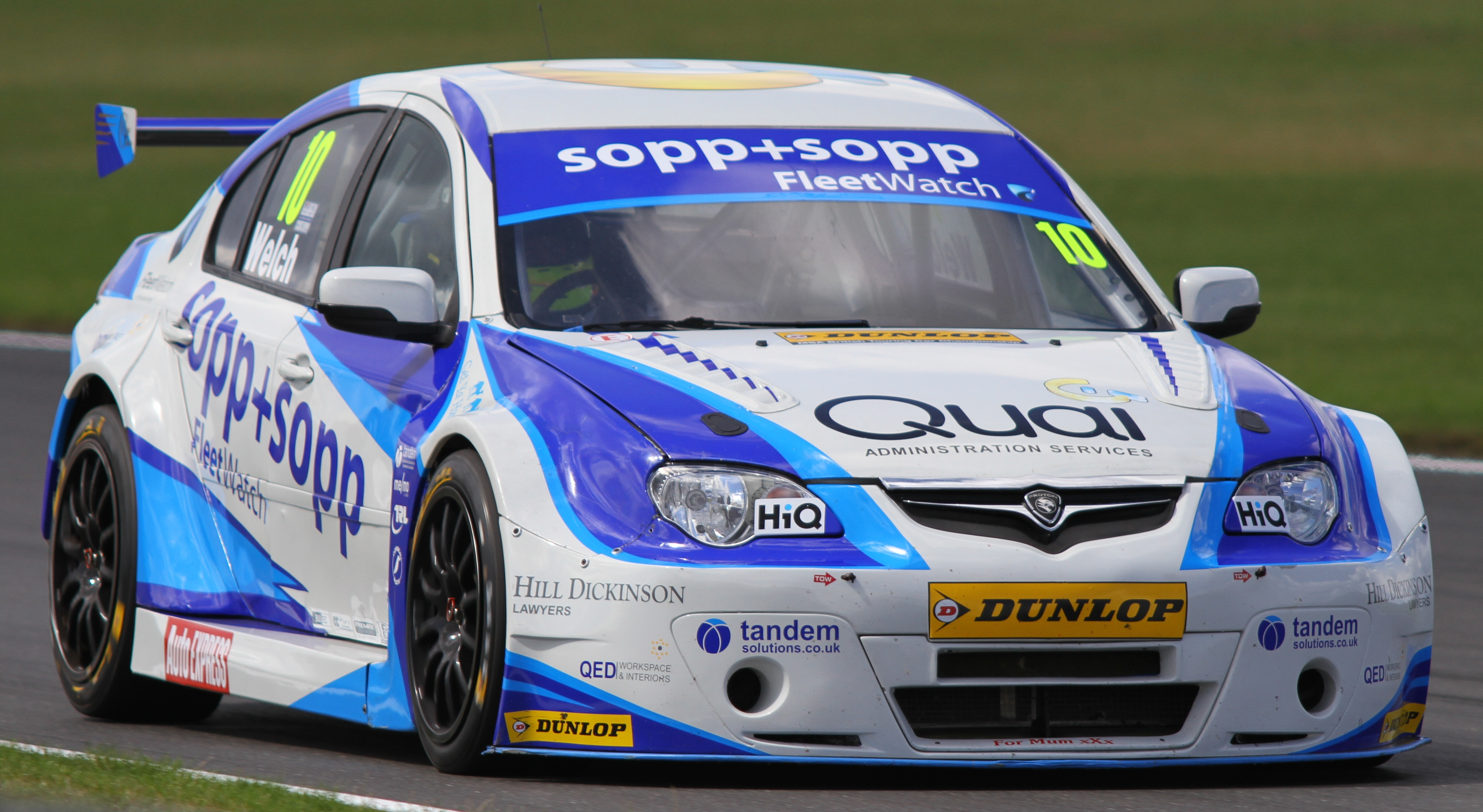
Daniel Welch in his NGTC Proton Persona during the 2013 BTCC Snetterton GP.

In 2011, Welch stepped up to the Dunlop MSA British Touring Car Championship, once again driving for his family team in a Proton Gen-2, built to the then-new NGTC regulations. He competed in the final half of the season from Snetterton onwards, finishing 22nd in the Drivers' Championship, having secured his first BTCC point at the penultimate race of the season at Silverstone.

Welch continued to race in the BTCC in 2012. He had his best weekend of the season at Oulton Park, finishing sixth in Race 1 and then holding off Matt Neal to claim fourth in Race 2. For this he won the HiQ Champagne Moment award, as voted for by fans. Welch finished the season 15th in the Drivers' Championship.

Welch and his team continued to compete in the BTCC in 2013, finishing 18th in the Drivers' Championship with a best result of sixth at Knockhill. Welch finished 32nd in the 2014 Drivers' Championship after a disappointing season in which the team struggled with their new self-built engines.

After a difficult 2015 season, Welch revealed plans to sell their pair of Proton Gen-2 cars at the end of the season.

== Racing record ==
=== Racing career summary ===
Season	Series	Team	Races	Wins	Poles	F/Laps	Podiums	Points	Position
2000	Formula Vauxhall	N/A	?	?	?	?	?	88	4th
2001	Formula Renault 2.0 UK	Falcon Motorsport	7	0	0	0	0	57	21st
2002	Formula Renault 2.0 UK	Cliff Dempsey Racing	2	0	0	0	0	8	33rd
2002	Formula Renault 2.0 UK	Welch Motorsport	2	0	0	0	0	8	33rd
2003	Formula Renault 2.0 UK	Welch Motorsport	13	0	0	0	0	47	22nd
2004	Formula Renault 2.0 UK	Paston Racing	2	0	0	0	0	23	33rd
2004	Formula Renault 2.0 UK	Welch Motorsport	6	0	0	0	0	23	33rd
2004	Renault Clio Cup United Kingdom	Aurok Motorsport	2	0	0	0	0	17	26th
2005	Formula Renault 2.0 UK	Welch Motorsport	18	0	0	0	0	84	16th
2006	Formula Renault 2.0 UK	Welch Motorsport	6	0	0	0	0	9	31st
2007	SEAT Cupra Championship	Welch Motorsport	20	2	2	3	6	153.5	5th
2008	24 Hours of Dubai - A6	Team RPM	1	0	0	0	0	N/A	15th
2008	SEAT Cupra Championship	Welch Motorsport	20	0	0	2	4	183	6th
2009	SEAT León Supercopa Spain	Welch Motorsport	13	0	0	0	0	13	19th
2009	Ginetta G50 Cup	Welch Motorsport	3	1	3	2	3	96	16th
2009	SEAT León Eurocup	Welch Motorsport	2	0	0	0	0	0	26th
2010	24 Hours of Dubai - A3T	Strategic Transport Racing 1	1	0	0	0	0	N/A	4th
2010	SEAT León Eurocup	Welch Motorsport	2	1	1	0	1	10	15th
2010	SEAT León Supercopa Spain	Welch Motorsport	16	0	0	0	0	36	13th
2011	British Touring Car Championship	Welch Automotive	15	0	0	0	0	1	22nd
2012	British Touring Car Championship	Welch Motorsport with Sopp+Sopp	25	0	0	0	0	79	15th
2013	British Touring Car Championship	Welch Motorsport with Sopp+Sopp	27	0	0	0	0	72	18th
2014	British Touring Car Championship	STP Racing with Sopp & Sopp	25	0	0	0	0	-40	32nd
2015	24H Series - 997	STP Racing							
2015	24 Hours of Dubai - 997	STP Racing	0	0	0	0	0	N/A	N/A
2015	British Touring Car Championship	Welch Motorsport	19	0	0	0	0	1	29th
2016	British Touring Car Championship	Goodestone Racing	29	0	0	0	0	23	23rd
2018	British Touring Car Championship	Trade Price Cars with Brisky Racing	3	0	0	0	0	0	35th
2018	Porsche Carrera Cup Great Britain - Pro-Am	Welch Motorsport	4	0	1	0	4	28	7th

=== Complete British Touring Car Championship results ===
(key) (Races in bold indicate pole position – 1 point awarded in first race; races in italics indicate fastest lap – 1 point awarded all races; * signifies that driver lead race for at least one lap – 1 point awarded all races)

Year	Team	Car	1	2	3	4	5	6	7	8	9	10	11	12	13	14	15	16	17	18	19	20	21	22	23	24	25	26	27	28	29	30	Pos	Pts
2011	Welch Automotive	Proton Gen-2	BRH; 1	BRH; 2	BRH; 3	DON; 1	DON; 2	DON; 3	THR; 1	THR; 2	THR; 3	OUL; 1	OUL; 2	OUL; 3	CRO; 1	CRO; 2	CRO; 3	SNE; 1; 22	SNE; 2; 18	SNE; 3; 19	KNO; 1 NC	KNO; 2; 16	KNO; 3; 12	ROC; 1 Ret	ROC; 2 Ret	ROC; 3; 14	BRH; 1 Ret	BRH; 2 Ret	BRH; 3 DSQ	SIL; 1; 11	SIL; 2; 10	SIL; 3; 14	22nd	1
2012	Welch Motorsport with Sopp+Sopp	Proton Persona	BRH; 1; 17	BRH; 2; 11	BRH; 3 Ret	DON; 1; 12	DON; 2 Ret	DON; 3; 8	THR; 1 DNS	THR; 2 DNS	THR; 3 DNS	OUL; 1; 6	OUL; 2; 4	OUL; 3 Ret	CRO; 1 Ret	CRO; 2; 17	CRO; 3; 10	SNE; 1; 5	SNE; 2; 17	SNE; 3; 12	KNO; 1; 12	KNO; 2 Ret	KNO; 3; 12	ROC; 1	ROC; 2	ROC; 3	SIL; 1 Ret	SIL; 2; 8	SIL; 3; 14	BRH; 1; 16	BRH; 2 Ret	BRH; 3 Ret	15th	79
2013	Welch Motorsport with Sopp+Sopp	Proton Persona	BRH; 1; 11	BRH; 2; 14	BRH; 3; 12	DON; 1 NC	DON; 2; 15	DON; 3; 11	THR; 1; 14	THR; 2 Ret	THR; 3; 11	OUL; 1; 14	OUL; 2; 9	OUL; 3 Ret	CRO; 1; 17	CRO; 2; 11	CRO; 3 Ret	SNE; 1; 17	SNE; 2 Ret	SNE; 3; 20	KNO; 1 Ret	KNO; 2; 11	KNO; 3; 6	ROC; 1 Ret	ROC; 2 DNS	ROC; 3 DNS	SIL; 1; 13	SIL; 2; 9	SIL; 3; 10	BRH; 1; 13	BRH; 2 NC	BRH; 3; 19	18th	72
2014	STP Racing with Sopp & Sopp	Proton Persona	BRH; 1	BRH; 2	BRH; 3	DON; 1; 21	DON; 2; 19	DON; 3; 21	THR; 1; 21	THR; 2; 24	THR; 3; 24	OUL; 1; 27	OUL; 2; 20	OUL; 3; 23	CRO; 1; 24	CRO; 2; 21	CRO; 3 Ret	SNE; 1 Ret	SNE; 2 Ret	SNE; 3; 21	KNO; 1 Ret	KNO; 2 Ret	KNO; 3 DNS	ROC; 1; 24	ROC; 2; 21	ROC; 3; 16	SIL; 1 Ret	SIL; 2 Ret	SIL; 3 Ret	BRH; 1; 21	BRH; 2 Ret	BRH; 3 DNS	32nd	−40
2015	Welch Motorsport	Proton Persona	BRH; 1	BRH; 2	BRH; 3	DON; 1 Ret	DON; 2 Ret	DON; 3 DNS	THR; 1 DNS	THR; 2 DNS	THR; 3 DNS	OUL; 1; 20	OUL; 2; 17	OUL; 3; 15	CRO; 1; 23	CRO; 2; 20	CRO; 3; 21	SNE; 1	SNE; 2	SNE; 3	KNO; 1; 21	KNO; 2; 18	KNO; 3; 22	ROC; 1; 21	ROC; 2; 19	ROC; 3 Ret	SIL; 1; 18	SIL; 2; 18	SIL; 3 Ret	BRH; 1 Ret	BRH; 2 Ret	BRH; 3 DNS	28th	1
2016	Goodestone Racing	Proton Persona	BRH; 1; 15	BRH; 2; 12	BRH; 3; 20	DON; 1 Ret	DON; 2 Ret	DON; 3; 24	THR; 1; 9	THR; 2; 9	**THR**; **3** Ret	OUL; 1; 20	OUL; 2; 24	OUL; 3; 17	CRO; 1 Ret	CRO; 2 Ret	CRO; 3; 17	SNE; 1; 17	SNE; 2 Ret	SNE; 3 DNS	KNO; 1; 21	KNO; 2; 20	KNO; 3; 14	ROC; 1 Ret	ROC; 2 Ret	ROC; 3 Ret	SIL; 1; 21	SIL; 2; 14	SIL; 3; 25	BRH; 1; 22	BRH; 2; 27	BRH; 3 Ret	23rd	23
2018	Trade Price Cars with Brisky Racing	Volkswagen CC	BRH; 1	BRH; 2	BRH; 3	DON; 1	DON; 2	DON; 3	THR; 1	THR; 2	THR; 3	OUL; 1	OUL; 2	OUL; 3	CRO; 1	CRO; 2	CRO; 3	SNE; 1; 21	SNE; 2 Ret	SNE; 3; 19	ROC; 1	ROC; 2	ROC; 3	KNO; 1	KNO; 2	KNO; 3	SIL; 1	SIL; 2	SIL; 3	BRH; 1	BRH; 2	BRH; 3	37th	0

== 24 Hours of Silverstone results ==
Year	Team	Co-Drivers	Car	Car No.	Class	Laps	Pos.	Class Pos.
2010	(United Kingdom) Strategic Racing / John Welch Motorsport	(Australia) Brent Niall (Australia) Malcolm Niall (Australia) Clint Harvey	SEAT Leon Supercopa	44	3	536	7th	3rd
