= A1 Team Canada =

- Canada
- Founded: 2005
- Seat holder(s): Wade Cherwayko
- Team principal: -
- Race driver(s): TBA
- Car nickname: n/a
- First race: 2005-06 Great Britain
- Rounds entered: 32 (64 races)
- Championships: 0
- Sprint race victories: 1
- Feature race victories: 1
- Pole positions: 2
- Fastest laps: 2
- Total points: 167
- 2008-09 position: NC (0 pts)

A1 Team Canada was the Canadian team of A1 Grand Prix, an international racing series.

== Management ==
A1 Team Canada's previous seat holder was Jay Laski. However Wade Cherwayko took over and became the current seat holder.

== History ==
=== 2008–09 season ===
The team did not race, apparently due to a lack of sponsorship cash.

=== 2007–08 season ===
Drivers: James Hinchcliffe, Robert Wickens

After an uncompetitive start, Robert Wickens scored all of the team's 75 points in 2007–08, as well as picking up another victory and four podiums. The team finished 9th overall.

=== 2006–07 season ===
Drivers: James Hinchcliffe, Sean McIntosh

Although the team scored in less races, Team Canada still managed to pick up a podium and finish in 11th position.

=== 2005–06 season ===
Drivers: Patrick Carpentier, Sean McIntosh

Team Canada had mixed fortunes during the first season. A victory, and a podium finish along with other consistent scoring helped them to finish in 11th position.

== Drivers ==
Name	Seasons	Races (Starts)	A1GP Title	Wins	Sprint wins	Main wins	2nd	3rd	Poles	Fastest Laps	Points
Patrick Carpentier	2005-06	3 (6)									16
James Hinchcliffe	2006-07, 2007-08	10 (20)					1			1	22
Sean McIntosh	2005-06, 2006-07	12 (24)		1		1		1			53
Robert Wickens	2007-08	7 (14)		1	1		2	2	2	1	75

== Complete A1 Grand Prix results ==
(key), "spr" indicate a Sprint Race, "fea" indicate a Main Race.

Year	Racing team	Chassis, Engine, Tyres	Drivers	1	2	3	4	5	6	7	8	9	10	11	12	13	14	15	16	17	18	19	20	21	22	Points	Rank
2005-06	John Village Automotive	Lola, Zytek, Cooper Avon		GBR spr	GBR fea	GER spr	GER fea	PRT spr	PRT fea	AUS spr	AUS fea	MYS spr	MYS fea	ARE spr	ARE fea	ZAF spr	ZAF fea	IDN spr	IDN fea	MEX spr	MEX fea	USA spr	USA fea	CHN spr	CHN fea	59	11th
2005-06	John Village Automotive	Lola, Zytek, Cooper Avon	Sean McIntosh	19	9	7	3	7	Ret	9	Ret	15	Ret	5	6	12	10	Ret	1							59	11th
2005-06	John Village Automotive	Lola, Zytek, Cooper Avon	Patrick Carpentier																	9	15	6	5	Ret	7	59	11th
2006-07	John Village Automotive	Lola; Zytek; Cooper Avon		NED spr	NED fea	CZE spr	CZE fea	BEI spr	BEI fea	MYS spr	MYS fea	IDN spr	IDN fea	NZ spr	NZ fea	AUS spr	AUS fea	ZAF spr	ZAF fea	MEX spr	MEX fea	SHA spr	SHA fea	GBR spr	GBR fea	33	11th
2006-07	John Village Automotive	Lola; Zytek; Cooper Avon	James Hinchcliffe	8	13	2	5	4	10					6	6	13	Ret	13	Ret	13	15					33	11th
2006-07	John Village Automotive	Lola; Zytek; Cooper Avon	Sean McIntosh							8	5	8	Ret									Ret	6	10	12	33	11th
2007-08	Status Grand Prix	Lola; Zytek; Cooper Avon		NED spr	NED fea	CZE spr	CZE fea	MYS spr	MYS fea	ZHU spr	ZHU fea	NZ spr	NZ fea	AUS spr	AUS fea	ZAF spr	ZAF fea	MEX spr	MEX fea	SHA spr	SHA fea	GBR spr	GBR fea			75	9th
2007-08	Status Grand Prix	Lola; Zytek; Cooper Avon	James Hinchcliffe	19	18	12	11															15	17			75	9th
2007-08	Status Grand Prix	Lola; Zytek; Cooper Avon	Robert Wickens					3	Ret	15	Ret	Ret	2	3	6	1	12	7	5	2	20					75	9th
