= Yelmer Buurman =

Dutch professional racing driver

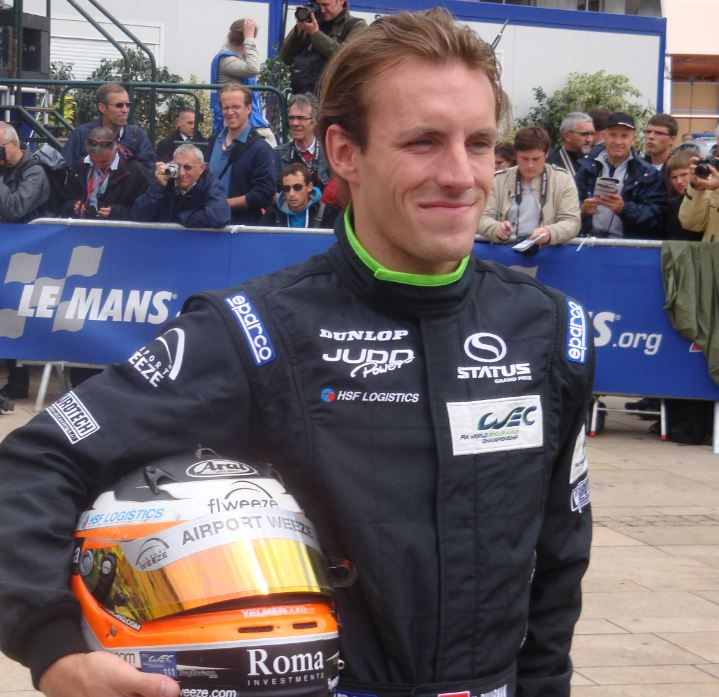
- Buurman at the 2012 24 Hours of Le Mans
- Nationality: Dutch
- Born: Yelmer Evert Frans Buurman; 19 February 1987 (age 39) Ubbergen, Netherlands

GT3 career
- Debut season: 2008
- Current team: A.C. Milan
- Categorisation: FIA Platinum
- Car number: 3
- Former teams: PSV Eindhoven; R.S.C. Anderlecht
- Starts: 23
- Wins: 2
- Poles: 0
- Fastest laps: 4
- Best finish: 1st in 2008

Previous series
- 2008–2009–10 2008 2007 2006–07 2005–06 2004–05 2004 2003–05 2003–04 2003–04 2002 2002: GP2 Asia Series; GP2 Series; Formula Renault 3.5 Series; Formula Three Euroseries; British Formula 3 Formula Renault UK; FTR 2000 Winter Series; FR2.0 Netherlands; Eurocup Formula Renault 2.0; FRUK Winter Series; Formula König; Dutch Winter Endurance

Yelmer Evert Frans Buurman (born 19 February 1987) is a Dutch professional racing driver. He was 3rd in the Blancpain Endurance Series in 2013, and second in the FIA GT1 Championship in 2012. Besides achieving victories in those categories, also won several races in the Superleague Formula, and was second in the 2013 24 Hours of Nürburgring.

== Career ==
=== Formula König ===
Born in Ubbergen, Gelderland, Buurman drove in the German-based Formula König championship in 2002, finishing twentieth in the season standings.

=== Formula Renault ===
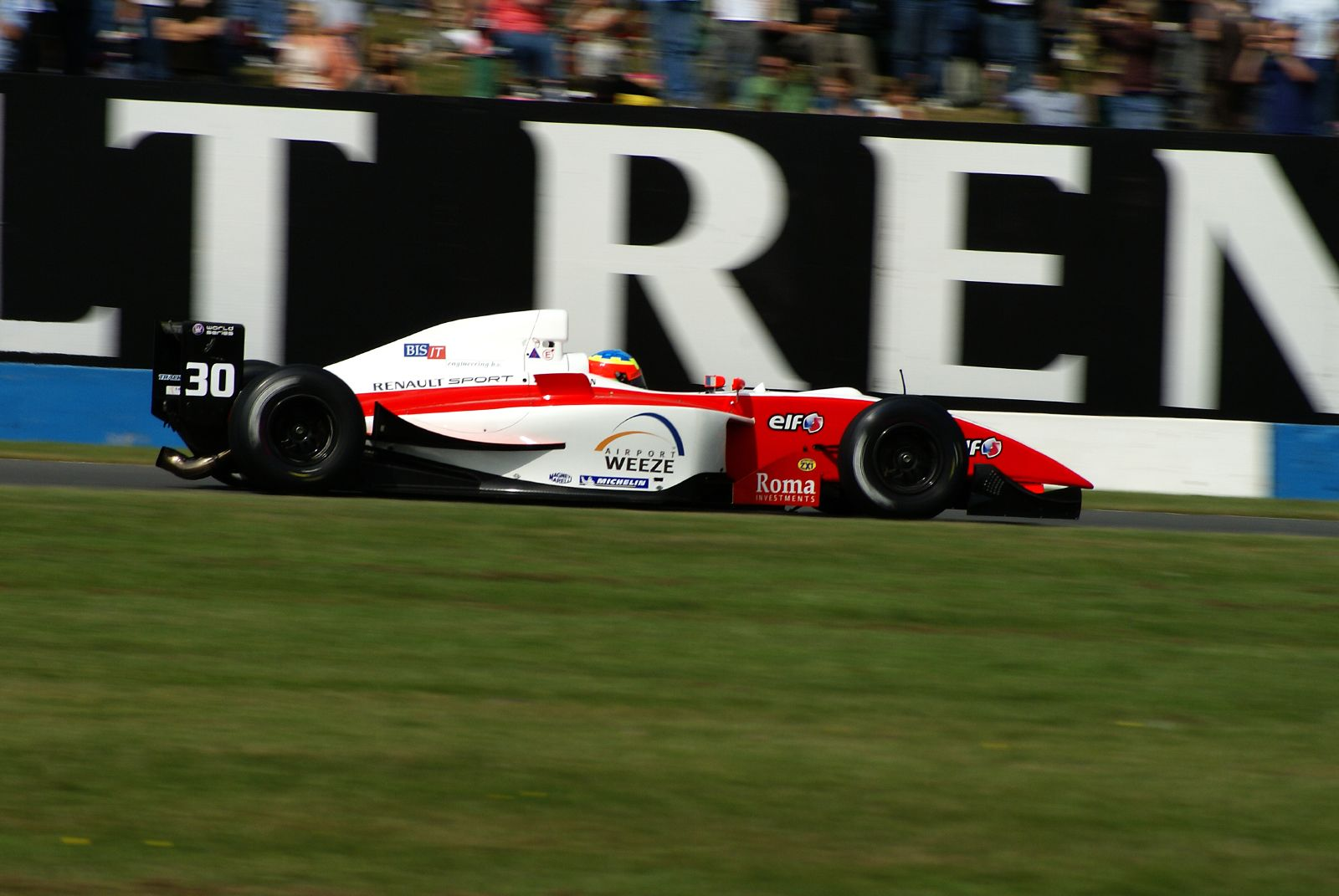
Buurman driving for Fortec Motorsport in the Donington Park round of the 2007 Formula Renault 3.5 Series season.

Buurman concentrated on various Formula Renault championships from 2003 to 2005, competing in the British, Dutch, European and American series during this period. In the British Winter Series in 2003, he began a four-year association with the Fortec Motorsport team. His most successful FRenault championships were the 2003 British Winter Series and the 2004 Dutch season, finishing third in both.

In 2007, Buurman made a brief appearance for Fortec in the Formula Renault 3.5 Series, replacing the injured Richard Philippe for four races. At the second race weekend in which he replaced Philippe, he finished fifth and fourth in the two races.

=== Formula Three ===
Following two races in British Formula Three in 2005, Buurman concentrated on this formula for 2006 and 2007. In 2006, he finished in fourth place in the British championship and drove in four races in the Formula Three Euroseries for Fortec. In 2007, he switched to the Euroseries full-time with the Manor Motorsport team, taking sixth place in the championship. He also competed in the stand-alone Macau Grand Prix and Masters F3 events in both years.

=== GP2 Series ===
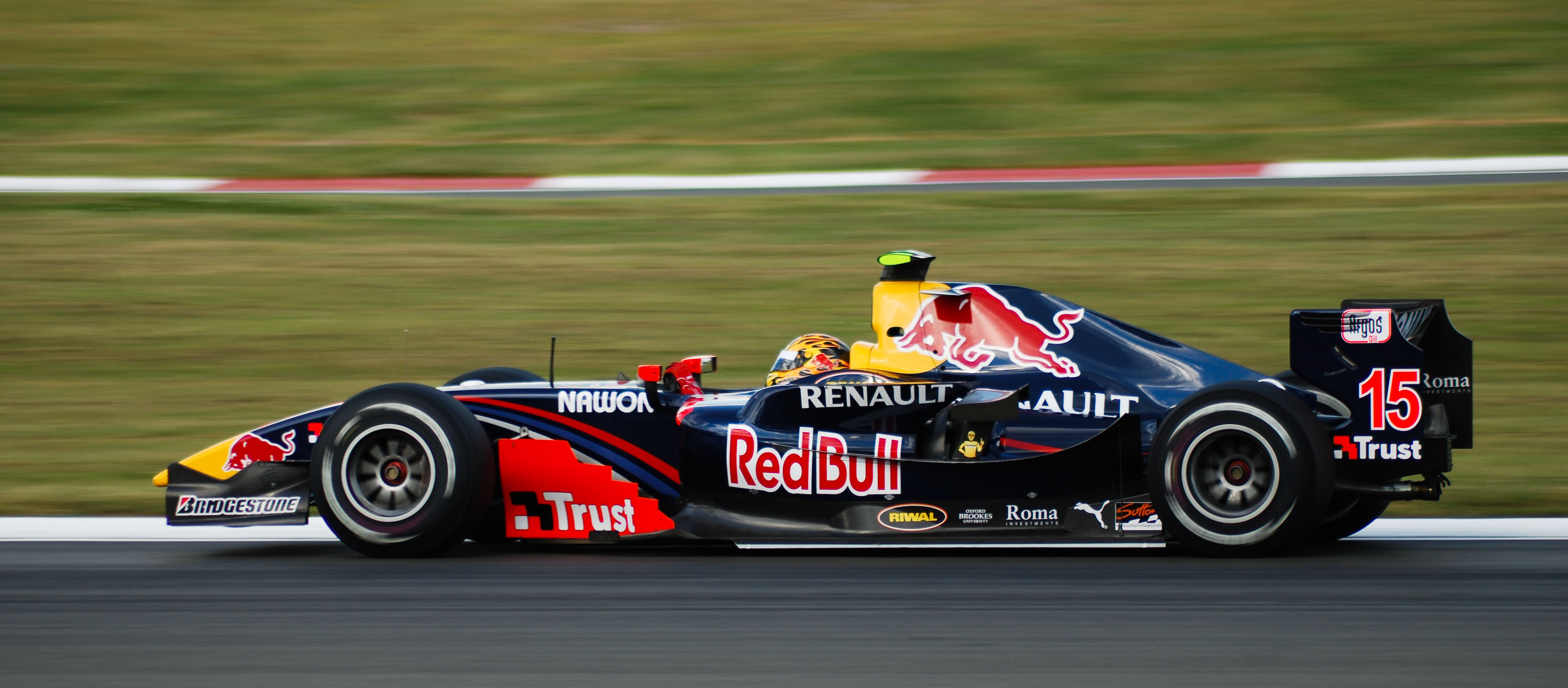
Buurman driving for Arden at the 2008 GP2 Series season Silverstone round.

In 2008, Buurman competed in both the GP2 Series and the new GP2 Asia Series for the Arden team, alongside Sébastien Buemi. He was not originally scheduled to race in the Asian championship, but replaced Adam Langley-Khan when the Pakistani driver decided to focus on his A1 Grand Prix and education commitments and left the team after two rounds of the season.

After ten races of the GP2 Series season, Buurman was replaced at Arden by Luca Filippi, who had in turn lost his previous drive with the ART Grand Prix team to Sakon Yamamoto.

Buurman was signed by the newly renamed Ocean Racing Technology team for the remainder of the 2008–09 GP2 Asia Series season. He was replaced for the final round by Karun Chandhok however, but he finished 19th in the championship. He was recalled to the team for the final two rounds of the 2009–10 GP2 Asia Series season.

=== Superleague Formula ===
Following the loss of his GP2 drive, Buurman moved to the new Superleague Formula series as a driver for the PSV Eindhoven team. He finished in second position in the 2008 championship. For the 2009 season, he drove for the R.S.C. Anderlecht team. For 2010, Buurman will drive for his third different side, moving to the Atech Grand Prix-run A.C. Milan outfit.

=== Sports car racing ===
In 2011, Buurman debuted in the FIA GT1 Championship in the final round at Potrero de los Funes, with a Chevrolet Corvette C6.R of Exim Bank Team China, winning the two races.

Buurman became a full-time driver for Vitaphone in the FIA GT1 Championship in 2012 along with Michael Bartels; posted four wins, two seconds places, two thirds, two fourths and two fifths, so that finished fifth in the championship behind the pairings Marc Basseng / Markus Winkelhock and Stef Dusseldorp / Frédéric Makowiecki. He also contested in the 24 Hours of Le Mans and the 6 Hours of Castellet with a LMP2's car Lola B12/80, where he finished third in the Paul Ricard race.

Marc VDS Racing Team hired Buurman to drive a BMW Z4 for the 2013 Blancpain Endurance Series, more precisely in the Pro Cup class, along with Maxime Martin and Bas Leinders. The trio won a race, so that finished fourth in the series. Furthermore, Buurman finished second in the 24 Hours of Nurburgring.

Buurman won the 2018 Blancpain GT Series Endurance Cup and the Pro-Am division of the 2020 British GT Championship.

== Racing record ==
=== Career summary ===
Season	Series	Team name	Races	Wins	Poles	F/Laps	Podiums	Points	Position
2002	Formula König	Lohmann Motorsport	14	0	0	?	?	53	20th
2003	Formula Renault 2000 Eurocup	Equipe Verschuur	4	0	0	0	0	6	22nd
2003	Formula Renault 2000 Netherlands	Equipe Verschuur	?	?	?	?	?	110	6th
2003	Formula Renault 2.0 UK Winter Series	Fortec Motorsport	4	1	1	1	2	49	**3rd**
2004	Formula Renault 2000 Eurocup	AR Motorsport	15	0	0	0	0	4	30th
2004	Formula Renault 2000 Netherlands	AR Motorsport	?	?	?	?	?	174	**3rd**
2004	Formula Renault 2.0 UK	Fortec Motorsport	2	0	0	0	0	8	37th
2004	Formula Renault 2.0 UK Winter Series	Fortec Motorsport	4	0	0	1	1	71	5th
2004	Formula TR 2000 Pro Series Winter Invitational	?	5	0	0	?	?	82	6th
2005	Formula Renault 2.0 UK	Fortec Motorsport	20	3	1	1	5	359	4th
2005	British Formula 3 International Series	Fortec Motorsport	2	0	0	0	0	0	19th
2005	Formula Renault 2.0 Netherlands	Fortec Motorsport	2	0	0	0	0	11	26th
2006	British Formula 3 International Series	Fortec Motorsport	22	2	0	0	5	186	4th
2006	Formula 3 Euro Series	Fortec Motorsport	4	0	0	0	0	1	17th
2006	Macau Grand Prix	Fortec Motorsport	1	0	0	0	0	N/A	8th
2006	Masters of Formula 3	Fortec Motorsport	1	0	0	0	0	N/A	19th
2007	Formula 3 Euro Series	Manor Motorsport	20	0	0	0	3	40	6th
2007	Macau Grand Prix	Manor Motorsport	1	0	0	0	0	N/A	NC
2007	Masters of Formula 3	Manor Motorsport	1	0	0	0	0	N/A	7th
2007	Formula Renault 3.5 Series	Fortec Motorsport	4	0	0	0	0	15	20th
2008	GP2 Series	Trust Team Arden	10	0	0	0	1	5	20th
2008	GP2 Asia Series	Trust Team Arden	6	0	0	0	1	13	9th
2008	Superleague Formula	PSV Eindhoven	12	1	0	2	2	337	**2nd**
2008–09	GP2 Asia Series	Ocean Racing Technology	6	0	0	0	0	4	19th
2009	Superleague Formula	R.S.C. Anderlecht	11	1	0	2	2	305	4th
2009–10	GP2 Asia Series	Ocean Racing Technology	4	0	0	0	0	0	21st
2010	Superleague Formula	A.C. Milan	31	3	1	4	9	631	5th
2010	Formula One	Force India F1 Team	Test driver						
2011	Superleague Formula	Netherlands - PSV Eindhoven	6	1	0	0	2	130	4th
2011	FIA GT1 World Championship	Exim Bank Team China	2	2	0	0	2	33	15th
2012	European Le Mans Series - LMP2	Status Grand Prix	1	0	0	0	1	15	10th
2012	24 Hours of Le Mans - LMP2	Status Grand Prix	1	0	0	0	0	N/A	DNF
2012	FIA GT1 World Championship	Vita4One Racing Team	12	4	1	?	8	15	10th
2012	Blancpain Endurance Series - Pro	Vita4One Racing Team	1	0	0	0	0	4	30th
2013	Blancpain Endurance Series - Pro	Marc VDS Racing Team	5	1	0	0	2	71	**3rd**
2013	24 Hours of Nürburgring - SP9	Marc VDS Racing Team	1	0	0	0	1	N/A	**2nd**
2013	FIA GT Series - Pro	Vita4One Racing Team	2	0	0	0	0	1	22nd
2013	ADAC GT Masters	Vita4One Racing Team	4	0	0	0	0	10	32nd
2014	Blancpain Endurance Series - Pro	Black Falcon	1	0	0	0	0	9	19th
2014	24 Hours of Nürburgring - SP9	Black Falcon	1	0	0	0	0	N/A	DNF
2014	Blancpain Sprint Series	Vita4One Racing Team	2	0	0	0	0	0	NC
2015	Blancpain Endurance Series - Pro	Black Falcon	5	0	0	0	0	10	20th
2015	24H Series - A6	Black Falcon							
2015	24 Hours of Nürburgring - SP9	Black Falcon	1	0	0	0	0	N/A	DNF
2016	Blancpain GT Series Endurance Cup	Black Falcon	2	0	0	0	0	0	NC
2016	24H Series - A6	Black Falcon							
2016	24 Hours of Nürburgring - SP9	AMG - Team Black Falcon	1	0	0	0	0	N/A	4th
2017	Blancpain GT Series Endurance Cup	Black Falcon	5	0	0	0	0	19	19th
2017	24H Series - A6	Black Falcon							
2017	ADAC GT Masters	Team Zakspeed	2	0	1	0	0	0	NC
2017	24 Hours of Nürburgring - SP9	Mercedes-AMG Team Black Falcon	1	0	0	0	0	N/A	5th
2018	Blancpain GT Series Endurance Cup	Mercedes-AMG Team Black Falcon	5	1	1	1	2	73	**1st**
2018	24 Hours of Nürburgring - SP9	Mercedes-AMG Team Black Falcon	1	0	0	0	1	N/A	**3rd**
2018	24H GT Series - A6	Black Falcon							
2018	British GT Championship - GT3	ERC Sport	9	1	0	0	3	133.5	4th
2019	Blancpain GT Series Endurance Cup	Mercedes-AMG Team Black Falcon	5	0	1	0	2	51	**3rd**
2019	24 Hours of Nürburgring - SP9	Mercedes-AMG Team Black Falcon	1	0	0	0	0	N/A	DNF
2019	Intercontinental GT Challenge	Mercedes-AMG Team Black Falcon	1	0	1	0	1	48	9th
2019	Intercontinental GT Challenge	Mercedes-AMG Team GruppeM Racing	1	0	0	0	0	48	9th
2019	Intercontinental GT Challenge	Mercedes-AMG Team Craft Bamboo Racing	1	0	0	0	0	48	9th
2019	Intercontinental GT Challenge	Mercedes-AMG Team SPS Automotive Performance	1	0	0	0	0	48	9th
2019	24H GT Series - A6	Abu Dhabi Racing Black Falcon							
2020	GT World Challenge Europe Endurance Cup	GetSpeed Performance	1	0	0	0	0	0	NC
2020	Intercontinental GT Challenge	Mercedes-AMG Team Craft Bamboo Black Falcon	1	0	0	0	0	12	15th
2020	24 Hours of Nürburgring - SP9	Mercedes-AMG Team HRT Bilstein	1	0	0	0	0	N/A	9th
2020	British GT Championship - GT3	Ram Racing	9	0	0	0	3	111	5th
2021	British GT Championship - GT3	Ram Racing	9	1	1	0	4	162.5	**2nd**
2021	24 Hours of Nürburgring - SP9	10Q Racing Team Hauer & Zabel GbR	1	0	0	0	0	N/A	10th
2023	Lamborghini Super Trofeo Europe - Pro-Am	Iron Lynx	10	1	?	?	?	88	5th
2023	24 Hours of Nürburgring - SP9	Konrad Motorsport	1	0	0	0	0	N/A	DNF
2024	Nürburgring Langstrecken-Serie - SP9	PROsport-Racing							
2025	International GT Open	Team Motopark	4	0	0	0	0	0	52nd
2025–26	Asian Le Mans Series - GT	Vista AF Corse	2	0	0	0	0	14	16th
2026	GT World Challenge Europe Endurance Cup	KPX Motorsport	1	0	0	0	0	0	NC†
2026	International GT Open	Team Motopark	2	0	0	0	0	0	NC†

=== Complete Formula Renault 3.5 Series results ===
(key) (Races in bold indicate pole position) (Races in italics indicate fastest lap)

Year	Entrant	1	2	3	4	5	6	7	8	9	10	11	12	13	14	15	16	17	DC	Points
2007	Fortec Motorsport	MNZ; 1	MNZ; 2	NÜR; 1; 14	NÜR; 2; 5	MON; 1	HUN; 1	HUN; 2	SPA; 1	SPA; 2	DON; 1; 5	DON; 2; 4	MAG; 1	MAG; 2	EST; 1	EST; 2	CAT; 1	CAT; 2	20th	15

=== Complete GP2 Series results ===
(key) (Races in bold indicate pole position) (Races in italics indicate fastest lap)

Year	Entrant	1	2	3	4	5	6	7	8	9	10	11	12	13	14	15	16	17	18	19	20	DC	Points
2008	Trust Team Arden	CAT; FEA; Ret	CAT; SPR; 10	IST; FEA; 14	IST; SPR; Ret	MON; FEA; 12	MON; SPR; 8	MAG; FEA; 12	MAG; SPR; 2	SIL; FEA; 15	SIL; SPR; 10	HOC; FEA	HOC; SPR	HUN; FEA	HUN; SPR	VAL; FEA	VAL; SPR	SPA; FEA	SPA; SPR	MNZ; FEA	MNZ; SPR	20th	5

==== Complete GP2 Asia Series results ====
(key) (Races in bold indicate pole position) (Races in italics indicate fastest lap)

Year	Entrant	1	2	3	4	5	6	7	8	9	10	11	12	DC	Points
2008	Trust Team Arden	DUB1; FEA	DUB1; SPR	SEN; FEA	SEN; SPR	SEP; FEA; 6	SEP; SPR; 5	BHR; FEA; 9	BHR; SPR; 8	DUB2; FEA; 3	DUB2; SPR; 5			9th	13
2008–09	Ocean Racing Technology	SHI; FEA	SHI; SPR	DUB; FEA; Ret	DUB; SPR; C	BHR1; FEA; Ret	BHR1; SPR; 13	LSL; FEA; Ret	LSL; SPR; DNS	SEP; FEA; 5	SEP; SPR; 11	BHR2; FEA	BHR2; SPR	19th	4
2009–10	Ocean Racing Technology	YMC1; FEA	YMC1; SPR	YMC2; FEA	YMC2; SPR	BHR1; FEA; 12	BHR1; SPR; 10	BHR2; FEA; 13	BHR2; SPR; 7					21st	0

=== Superleague Formula ===
==== 2008-2009 ====
(Races in bold indicate pole position) (Races in italics indicate fastest lap)

Year	Team	Operator	1		2		3		4		5		6		Position	Points
2008	PSV Eindhoven	Azerti Motorsport	DON		NÜR		ZOL		EST		VAL		JER		**2nd**	**337**
2008	PSV Eindhoven	Azerti Motorsport	4	8	10	1	7	3	9	8	10	3	8	9	**2nd**	**337**
2009	R.S.C. Anderlecht	Zakspeed	MAG		ZOL		DON		EST		MOZ		JAR		4th	305
2009	R.S.C. Anderlecht	Zakspeed	2	5	8	14	16	D	4	4	6	6	1	15	4th	305

==== 2009 Super Final Results ====
- Super Final results in 2009 did not count for points towards the main championship.

Year	Team	1	2	3	4	5	6
2009	**R.S.C. Anderlecht**; **Zakspeed**	MAG; 4	ZOL; N/A	DON; DNQ	EST; 4	MOZ; N/A	JAR; 1

==== 2010 ====
Year	Team	Operator	1			2			3			4			5			6			7			8			9			10			NC			11			Position	Points
2010	A.C. Milan	Atech	SIL			ASS			MAG			JAR			NÜR			ZOL			BRH			ADR			POR			ORD			BEI			NAV			5th	631
2010	A.C. Milan	Atech	2	16	X	5	7	3	1	7	1	2	10	3	1	8	**3**	4	5	5	4	12	4	11	4	X	10	16	X	6	7	4	7	3	C	7	12	X	5th	631
2011	Azerti Motorsport	Netherlands – PSV Eindhoven	HOL			BEL																																	4th	130
2011	Azerti Motorsport	Netherlands – PSV Eindhoven	1	10	3	6	6	7																															4th	130

=== Complete GT1 World Championship results ===
Year	Team	Car	1	2	3	4	5	6	7	8	9	10	11	12	13	14	15	16	17	18	19	20	Pos	Points
2011	Exim Bank Team China	Corvette C6.R	ABU; QR	ABU; CR	ZOL; QR	ZOL; CR	ALG; QR	ALG; QR	SAC; QR	SAC; CR	SIL; QR	SIL; CR	NAV; QR	NAV; CR	PRI; QR	PRI; CR	ORD; QR	ORD; CR	BEI; QR	BEI; CR	SAN; QR; 1	SAN; CR; 1	15th	33
2012	BMW Team Vita4One	BMW E89 Z4 GT3	NOG; QR; 11	NOG; CR; 10	ZOL; QR; 1	ZOL; CR; 2	NAV; QR; 3	NAV; QR; 5	SVK; QR; 3	SVK; CR; 1	ALG; QR; 2	ALG; CR; 5	SVK; QR; 1	SVK; CR; 1	MOS; QR; 10	MOS; CR; 7	NUR; QR; 4	NUR; CR; 4	DON; QR; 9	DON; CR; 9			**3rd**	**144**

* Season still in progress.

=== 24 Hours of Le Mans Results ===
Year	Team	Co-Drivers	Car	Class	Laps	Pos.	Class Pos.
2012	(Republic of Ireland) Status Grand Prix	(United Kingdom) Alexander Sims (France) Romain Iannetta	Lola B12/80-Judd	LMP2	239	DNF	DNF

Sporting positions
Preceded by Mirko Bortolotti; Andrea Caldarelli; Christian Engelhart	Blancpain GT Series Endurance Cup; Champion; 2018; With: Maro Engel & Luca Stolz	Succeeded by Andrea Caldarelli; Marco Mapelli
Preceded by Jonny Cocker; Sam De Haan	British GT Championship; Pro-Am Champion; 2020–2021; With: Ian Loggie	Succeeded by Incumbent
