= 2009–10 A1 Grand Prix season =

Auto-racing series season

2009–10 A1 Grand Prix of Nations

Seasons
- ← 2008–09 none →

The 2009–10 A1 Grand Prix season would have been the fifth and last season of the A1 Grand Prix series. However, due to the series' financial insolvency, none of the originally scheduled races ever took place.

It would have been the first season of a three-year deal with IMG Sports Media to handle all worldwide media rights for the series.

Following doubts that the season would go ahead due to financial constraints and reports that engine suppliers Ferrari would pull out over non-payments, chairman of A1 Grand Prix Tony Teixeira, announced that the series had secured its long-term future, following a financial restructuring. Doubts were reinforced by the high-profile cancellation of the season's scheduled opening round in Australia for October 25. With the Malaysian and Chinese rounds cancelled, the season was reduced to having only rounds occurring in 2010. The circuit meant to stage the Dutch event, then pre-empted likely cancellation by scheduling a different event for that date. By May 2010, none of the remaining scheduled races had taken place, confirming the end of A1GP.

== Teams ==
Prior to the official list of teams originally supposed to compete in Australia being revealed, it was rumoured that the entry list would contain 20 teams, including a brand new team and a revival of an older team.

An official teams list for the Australian round was released on Tuesday 13 October. The provisional list showed 19 teams, with Canada, Korea, Lebanon and Malaysia not returning. Several drivers had provisionally signed up for their respective nations including John Martin, Felipe Guimarães, Zahir Ali, Satrio Hermanto, Fairuz Fauzy, Aaron Lim, Luis Díaz, Salvador Durán, Robert Doornbos and Jeroen Bleekemolen.

== Off-season testing ==
A one-day test for all teams was to have been held at Queensland Raceway on October 19, the week before the opening round at Surfers Paradise. However, as the cars were not due to arrive in Australia until Monday, the test session was cancelled.

== Season calendar ==
=== Prior to official announcement ===
- It was announced on 25 June 2009 that the 2009–10 season would feature at least ten events, following FIA approval of the season's calendar. Ten dates had been submitted, however there was also room for the addition of one or two extra dates to the calendar.
- A race at Surfers Paradise, Australia, titled the Nikon SuperGP, was confirmed for the weekend of 22–25 October 2009. It was to be held at the Gold Coast, since the city lost its Indy 300 claim after having issues involving money and a change of date which saw them fail to renew their agreement with the Indy Racing League IndyCar Series. CART and IndyCar had been a major event, as had the V8 Supercars, on the Gold Coast for 18 years making it unknown whether or not the local public would have readily accepted the series change, as in recent years, the V8 Supercars had become the main draw.
- The Dutch round of the championship was confirmed to have moved from Circuit Park Zandvoort to TT Circuit Assen, to be held on the weekend of May 14–16, 2010.
- It has also been rumoured that season 5 would have seen the first Indian race.
- Following on from the success of A1 Team Ireland in the 2008–09 season, Ireland could have played host to a round of either the 2009–10 or the 2010–11 season. Hermann Tilke and A1GP chairman Tony Teixeira were currently looking for interested parties and locations, with a street track located in the IFSC, Dublin having been earmarked as a possible location.
- It was reported in Autosport magazine that the series would race twice in China in season 5, as was the case in the 2006–07 and 2007–08 seasons.
- It was rumoured that there would be a New Zealand round at the new Hampton Downs Motorsport Park, but the circuit never officially became a round of the 2009–10 season.

=== Official schedule ===
On 21 September 2009 the series announced a nine-round calendar, which stated the nine nations that would play host to an event, but did not name which circuits would host those particular events. The expected street race in Indonesia was a notable omission, while Great Britain, host of the season finale in the previous three seasons, did not have a round named. Rumoured rounds in India and Ireland did not come to fruition. However, A1GP chairman Tony Teixeira said "I am confident this calendar, that may still include at least one more event, will achieve our criteria for the series".

It was announced on 17 October 2009 that the opening round at Surfers Paradise in Australia was cancelled, as the cars and other equipment for the A1GP teams had still not left London, and would not arrive in time for the event. Modifications to the V8 Supercars schedule was made to fill the gaps in the schedule. On 5 November 2009, the Malaysian date at the Sepang International Circuit was postponed indefinitely, and on the same day, the Chinese round was also confirmed as cancelled. The Dutch round at Assen was cancelled, with A1GP being replaced with a Superleague Formula race.

Country	Circuit	Date
Australia	Surfers Paradise Street Circuit, Gold Coast, Queensland	25 October 2009
China	Zhuhai International Circuit, Zhuhai	15 November 2009
Malaysia	Sepang International Circuit, Kuala Lumpur	6 December 2009
South Africa	Kyalami, Johannesburg, Gauteng	28 February 2010
Brazil	Autódromo José Carlos Pace, São Paulo, SP	14 March 2010
Mexico	Autodromo Hermanos Rodriguez, Mexico City	21 March 2010
Portugal	Autódromo Internacional do Algarve, Portimão	11 April 2010
Germany	Sachsenring, Hohenstein-Ernstthal	9 May 2010
Netherlands	TT Circuit Assen, Assen	16 May 2010
