= 2009 Portimão A1GP round =

2008–09 A1GP of Portugal

Race Details
- Race 6 of 7 in the 2008–09 A1 Grand Prix season
- Date: April 12, 2009
- Location: Autódromo Internacional do Algarve; Portimão, Portugal
- Weather: Clear, 21°C

Sprint race

Qualifying
- Pole: Italy (Vitantonio Liuzzi)
- Time: 1:30.875

Podium
- 1st: Netherlands (Robert Doornbos)
- 2nd: Ireland (Adam Carroll)
- 3rd: Portugal (Filipe Albuquerque)

Fastest Lap
- FL: Ireland (Adam Carroll)
- Time: 1:31.404, (Lap 8)

Feature race

Qualifying
- Pole: Netherlands (Robert Doornbos)
- Time: 1:30.415

Podium
- 1st: Switzerland (Neel Jani)
- 2nd: Portugal (Filipe Albuquerque)
- 3rd: Malaysia (Fairuz Fauzy)

Fastest Lap
- FL: Ireland (Adam Carroll)
- Time: 1:31.453, (Lap 35)

Official Classifications
- PDF Booklet

The 2008–09 Vodafone A1GP Algarve, Portugal was an A1 Grand Prix race held at Autódromo Internacional do Algarve, Portugal.

== Drivers ==
Team	Main Driver	Rookie Driver(s)	Reserve Driver
Australia	John Martin		
Brazil	Felipe Guimarães	Ana Beatriz	
Canada	Did Not Participate		
China	Ho-Pin Tung		
France	Nicolas Prost	Nicolas Prost	
Germany	André Lotterer	André Lotterer	
(United Kingdom) Great Britain	Dan Clarke	Dan Clarke	
India	Narain Karthikeyan	Parthiva Sureshwaren	
Indonesia	Zahir Ali	Zahir Ali	
(Republic of Ireland) Ireland	Adam Carroll	Niall Quinn	
Italy	Vitantonio Liuzzi	Vitantonio Liuzzi	
(South Korea) Korea	Did Not Participate		
Lebanon	Daniel Morad	Jimmy Auby	
Malaysia	Fairuz Fauzy	Aaron Lim	
Mexico	Salvador Durán		
Monaco	Clivio Piccione	Hubertus Bahlsen	
The Netherlands	Robert Doornbos	Dennis Retera	
New Zealand	Earl Bamber	Earl Bamber	
Pakistan	Did Not Participate		
Portugal	Filipe Albuquerque	Armando Parente	
South Africa	Adrian Zaugg	Cristiano Morgado	
Switzerland	Neel Jani	Alexandre Imperatori	
(United States) USA	Marco Andretti	Robbie Pecorari	

== Qualifying ==
Sprint race qualifying
Pos	Team	Time	Gap
1	Italy	1:30.875^{†}	–
2	Netherlands	1:31.346	+ 0.471
3	(Republic of Ireland) Ireland	1:31.600	+ 0.725
4	Lebanon	1:31.756^{†}	+ 0.881
5	Portugal	1:31.777	+ 0.902
6	New Zealand	1:32.006	+ 1.131
7	Germany	1:32.084^{†}	+ 1.209
8	South Africa	1:32.301	+ 1.426
9	India	1:32.358^{†}	+ 1.483
10	Monaco	1:32.420	+ 1.545
11	Malaysia	1:32.929	+ 2.054
12	(United States) USA	1:33.214	+ 2.339
13	(United Kingdom) Great Britain	1:33.860	+ 2.985
14	Brazil	1:33.985	+ 3.110
15	Indonesia	1:34.005	+ 3.130
16	Mexico	1:34.216	+ 3.341
17	Australia	1:34.405	+ 3.530
18	France	1:36.567	+ 5.692
19	China	1:36.838	+ 5.963
20	Switzerland	no time	

Feature race qualifying
Pos	Team	Time	Gap
1	Netherlands	1:30.415^{†}	–
2	(Republic of Ireland) Ireland	1:30.696^{†}	+ 0.281
3	Switzerland	1:30.878^{†}	+ 0.463
4	South Africa	1:30.984^{†}	+ 0.569
5	Brazil	1:31.023^{†}	+ 0.608
6	Malaysia	1:31.025^{†}	+ 0.610
7	Portugal	1:31.095^{†}	+ 0.680
8	(United States) USA	1:31.459^{†}	+ 1.044
9	Monaco	1:31.495^{†}	+ 1.080
10	Italy	1:31.852	+ 1.437
11	New Zealand	1:31.925^{†}	+ 1.510
12	Australia	1:31.939^{†}	+ 1.524
13	Mexico	1:32.031^{†}	+ 1.616
14	Germany	1:32.269	+ 1.854
15	Lebanon	1:32.352	+ 1.937
16	(United Kingdom) Great Britain	1:32.400^{†}	+ 1.985
17	India	1:32.504	+ 2.089
18	Indonesia	1:32.573^{†}	+ 2.158
19	France	1:32.941^{†}	+ 2.526
20	China	1:33.237^{†}	+ 2.822

^{†} Team utilized Powerboost lap.

== Sprint Race ==
Pos	Team	Driver	Laps	Time	Points
1	Netherlands	Robert Doornbos	11	19:33.501	10
2	(Republic of Ireland) Ireland	Adam Carroll	11	+ 3.635	8+1
3	Portugal	Filipe Albuquerque	11	+ 5.728	6
4	Italy	Vitantonio Liuzzi	11	+ 9.087	5
5	Monaco	Clivio Piccione	11	+ 10.048	4
6	India	Narain Karthikeyan	11	+ 12.596	3
7	Brazil	Felipe Guimarães	11	+ 13.297	2
8	Malaysia	Fairuz Fauzy	11	+ 18.014	1
9	Mexico	Salvador Durán	11	+ 20.545	
10	Australia	John Martin	11	+ 22.683	
11	(United Kingdom) Great Britain	Dan Clarke	11	+ 23.080	
12	(United States) USA	Marco Andretti	11	+ 23.154	
13	France	Nicolas Prost	11	+ 24.175	
14	Indonesia	Zahir Ali	11	+ 39.400	
15	Switzerland	Neel Jani	11	+ 44.296^{†}	
16	China	Ho Pin Tung	11	+ 50.655	
17	South Africa	Adrian Zaugg	9	+ 2 Laps	
18	Lebanon	Daniel Morad	1	Acc. Damage	
19	Germany	André Lotterer	0	Accident	
20	New Zealand	Earl Bamber	0	Spin	

^{†} Switzerland assessed penalty for pitting outside of pit-stop window.

== Feature Race ==
The second pit-stop window was set as Laps 26–34.

Pos	Team	Driver	Laps	Time	Points
1	Switzerland	Neel Jani	42	1:10:45.011	15
2	Portugal	Filipe Albuquerque	42	+ 6.786	12
3	Malaysia	Fairuz Fauzy	42	+ 9.705	10
4	Mexico	Salvador Durán	42	+ 16.332	8
5	(Republic of Ireland) Ireland	Adam Carroll	42	+ 25.411^{†}	6+1
6	France	Nicolas Prost	42	+ 27.322	5
7	(United Kingdom) Great Britain	Dan Clarke	42	+ 29.880	4
8	China	Ho Pin Tung	42	+ 34.586	3
9	Germany	André Lotterer	42	+ 43.970	2
10	Indonesia	Zahir Ali	42	+ 1:13.993	1
11	India	Narain Karthikeyan	39	Brakes	
12	Australia	John Martin	38	(Retired)	
13	Italy	Vitantonio Liuzzi	18	Accident	
14	(United States) USA	Marco Andretti	18	Accident	
15	Monaco	Clivio Piccione	18	Accident	
16	South Africa	Adrian Zaugg	15	Accident	
17	New Zealand	Earl Bamber	15	Accident	
18	Lebanon	Daniel Morad	1	Puncture	
19	Brazil	Felipe Guimarães	Did Not Start		
20	Netherlands	Robert Doornbos	Did Not Start		

^{†} – Ireland were given a 25-second penalty post-race for passing Australia under the safety car.

== Notes ==
- It was the 38th race weekend (76 starts).
- It was the 2nd race in Portugal and the first at the Autódromo Internacional do Algarve.
- It was the first race as main driver for (Italy) Vitantonio Liuzzi and (Germany) André Lotterer.
- It was the first race weekend as rookie driver for (Italy) Vitantonio Liuzzi, (Germany) André Lotterer and (United States) Robbie Pecorari.
- A1 Team Italy and Vitantonio Liuzzi achieved their first pole position.
- (Netherlands) Robert Doornbos achieved his first Sprint Race victory.
- (Switzerland) Neel Jani's win in the Feature Race was his tenth career victory, surpassing Nico Hülkenberg's record.
