= 2008 Nikon Indy 300 =

Coordinates: 27°59′17.9″S 153°25′42.1″E

(Australia) 2008 Surfers Paradise
Race details
- Non-championship round of the 2008 IndyCar Series season
- Track map of the Surfers Paradise street circuit at Surfers Paradise, Australia.
- Date: 26 October, 2008
- Official name: Nikon Indy 300
- Location: Surfers Paradise Street Circuit; Queensland, Australia
- Course: Temporary Street Circuit; 2.795 mi / 4.498 km
- Distance: 60 laps 167.700 mi / 269.880 km
- Weather: Fine with temperatures reaching up to 27.9 °C (82.2 °F)

Pole position
- Driver: (Australia) Will Power (KV Racing Technology)
- Time: 1:34.9451

Fastest lap
- Driver: (United Kingdom) Dario Franchitti (Target Chip Ganassi Racing)
- Time: 1:35.1552 (on lap 54 of 60)

Podium
- First: (Australia) Ryan Briscoe (Team Penske)
- Second: (New Zealand) Scott Dixon (Target Chip Ganassi Racing)
- Third: (United States) Ryan Hunter-Reay (Rahal Letterman Racing)

The 2008 Nikon Indy 300 was a non-championship Indycar exhibition race that was held as the 19th and final race of the 2008 IndyCar Series season. It was held on 26 October 2008 at the Surfers Paradise Street Circuit in Queensland, Australia.

It was the first time the race was held for the Indy Racing League after 17 years as a Champ Car race. The race did not count towards the 2008 IndyCar season points as the race date was held after the Chicagoland Speedway 300, which was preset as the season finale prior to the merger of Champ Car and IRL. The previous non-points race had been the 1992 Marlboro Challenge, a CART all-star race.

The race was won by an Australian driver for the first time in the 18-year history of the event with Ryan Briscoe winning for Team Penske after leading much of the race, while pushed hard by the near-local, New Zealander Scott Dixon. Ryan Hunter-Reay emerged from an entertaining dice to complete the podium in third position.

== Team changes ==
With the championship decided, some teams used the race as a prelude to the 2009 season. Dario Franchitti made his return to IndyCar after a failed attempt at breaking into NASCAR, taking Dan Wheldon's seat at Chip Ganassi Racing, with Wheldon moving on to his 2009 team, Panther Racing, replacing Vítor Meira. Meira moved to his new team, A. J. Foyt Enterprises.

== Qualifying ==
Rain fell in the early parts of qualifying which caught several cars out, most notably Danica Patrick who hit the wall on her out lap wrecking the nose of the car and putting her out of qualifying without a lap recorded. The rain stopped fairly early and Ryan Hunter-Reay made the best of the conditions topping Group 1, two and a half tenths of a second clear of Alex Tagliani. The group was well spaced with Vítor Meira and E. J. Viso almost a second behind the top two and well clear of the final two cars to advance, Mario Moraes and Ryan Briscoe. Graham Rahal missed the cut by less than two-tenths of a second with Oriol Servià the other car unlucky to miss out.

Will Power continued to show the pace he had shown through practice to top the second group, almost four second faster the Group 1 as the track dried. Tony Kanaan shadowed the local hero with Justin Wilson within a tenth of Kanaan. Scott Dixon and returning teammate Dario Franchitti progressed while again a Penske car sat on the bubble, Hélio Castroneves the last car to make it into Group 2. Marco Andretti was well down on Castroneves while Dan Wheldon made a troubled debut for his new team, missing the cut by almost two seconds.

Dixon topped Section 2 track times improving from over 1:50 to 1:39.2049 for Dixon's best lap. Castroneves improved to second ahead of Kanaan, who would subsequently lose his best lap and drop out of the top six, Franchitti and Briscoe. Power having led much of the session stopped early and had a nervous wait as his time was rapidly bettered, but made it through with Hunter-Reay joining the Firestone Fast Six.

Dixon, Power and Briscoe swapped top times early until Power started to dominate. With time running out Dixon recorded a 1:35.7672, the fastest lap time recorded in all of qualifying with Briscoe and Franchitti filling the top three when on his last lap Power backed off and found something for a last charge, recording a 1:34.9451, smashing the Fast Six field by eight-tenths of a second.

=== Qualifying results ===
Pos	Nat	Name	Team	Group 1	Group 2	Top 12	Firestone Fast Six
1	(Australia)	Will Power	KV Racing Technology		1:50.4357	1:40.4642	1:34.9451
2	(New Zealand)	Scott Dixon	Chip Ganassi Racing		1:50.7996	1:39.2049	1:35.7672
3	(Australia)	Ryan Briscoe	Team Penske	1:55.4900		1:40.3121	1:35.8007
4	(United Kingdom)	Dario Franchitti	Chip Ganassi Racing		1:51.3389	1:39.8594	1:35.9336
5	(United States)	Ryan Hunter-Reay	Rahal Letterman Racing	1:53.1807		1:40.8848	1:36.4030
6	(Brazil)	Hélio Castroneves	Team Penske		1:51.5920	1:39.6232	1:36.7425
7	(Canada)	Alex Tagliani	Conquest Racing	1:53.4650		1:41.3122	
8	(Brazil)	Tony Kanaan	Andretti Green Racing		1:50.6625	1:41.4023	
9	(United Kingdom)	Justin Wilson	Newman/Haas/Lanigan Racing		1:50.6966	1:42.0429	
10	(Venezuela)	E. J. Viso	HVM Racing	1:54.5978		1:42.9185	
11	(Brazil)	Vítor Meira	A.J. Foyt Racing	1:54.2486		1:44.3348	
12	(Brazil)	Mario Moraes	Dale Coyne Racing	1:55.1731		1:51.5054	
13	(United States)	Graham Rahal	Newman/Haas/Lanigan Racing	1:55.6155			
14	(United States)	Marco Andretti	Andretti Green Racing		1:52.2084		
15	(Spain)	Oriol Servià	KV Racing Technology	1:55.6628			
16	(Japan)	Hideki Mutoh	Andretti Green Racing		1:53.3353		
17	(Brazil)	Bruno Junqueira	Dale Coyne Racing	1:58.0183			
18	(United Kingdom)	Dan Wheldon	Panther Racing		1:53.9160		
19	(United States)	Ed Carpenter	Vision Racing	1:58.7664			
20	(Brazil)	Jaime Camara	Conquest Racing		1:54.0514		
21	(United States)	Townsend Bell	Dreyer & Reinbold Racing	1:58.9264			
22	(United States)	Buddy Rice	Dreyer & Reinbold Racing		1:54.3489		
23	(United States)	Danica Patrick	Andretti Green Racing	No time			
24	(United States)	A. J. Foyt IV	Vision Racing		No time		

== Race ==
Justin Wilson pitted on the warm-up lap with the gearbox sticking in third, but rejoined to start from the back. Will Power immediately dominated the start, pulling a two-second lead on the first lap. Scott Dixon started second but after being forced to cut the first chicane was relegated behind Ryan Briscoe by the officials.

Mario Moraes and Vítor Meira clashed at the second chicane with Meira spinning without hitting anyone. A few laps later Moraes caused the first full course caution, clipping the turn 2 chicane, breaking the right rear corner of the car. Townsend Bell was eliminated after a clash with Helio Castroneves which wrecked Bell's steering. Later the same lap Castroneves had a right rear puncture caused by Danica Patrick's front wing while passing the Andretti Green Racing driver.

Lap 17 saw the end of Power's dominance of the meeting as he crashed at the Bartercard chicane, which put Briscoe into the lead ahead of Dixon. Briscoe pitted for fuel immediately upon catching backmarker Patrick, but Dixon waited another lap and was held up behind her. At the same time Graham Rahal touched the rear of Car 20, spinning the Vision Racing car at the bottom corner and Ed Carpenter stopped as well, almost blocking the track. The emerging safety car almost hit Dixon as he completed his stop.

Behind the safety car Patrick stopped and stalled, almost hitting the stationary car of Carpenter. Dario Franchitti clipped the tyre bundle on the inside of the same chicane and spun and stalled bringing out the full course yellow. After the restart Tony Kanaan had the right rear suspension break without apparent reason.

After the second round of pitstops the battle for third between Alex Tagliani and Ryan Hunter-Reay was interrupted by Dario Franchitti as a poor pitstop and poor pit position for Conquest Racing saw Tagliani drop several position behind EJ Viso. Viso later would twice have to give up spots for cutting chicanes, first to Tagliani, then Castroneves. Lap 48 saw Jaime Camara go straight on and stalled the car attempting to recover.

In the races closing stages Dixon closed in on Briscoe, the two remaining local drivers lapping significantly faster than the rest of the field. Ed Carpenter hit the wall at turn 3 on the last lap but it did not affect the lead battle and Briscoe won his home race ahead of Dixon. Ryan Hunter-Reay finished third.

=== Race result ===
Final results sourced from:.

Pos	No	Driver	Team	Laps	Time/retired	Grid
1	6	(Australia) Ryan Briscoe	Team Penske	60	1:45:50.3868	3
2	9	(New Zealand) Scott Dixon	Chip Ganassi Racing	60	+0.5 secs	2
3	17	(United States) Ryan Hunter-Reay	Rahal Letterman Racing	60	+9.1 secs	5
4	36	(Canada) Alex Tagliani	Conquest Racing	60	+20.0 secs	7
5	5	(Spain) Oriol Servià	KV Racing Technology	60	+20.4 secs	15
6	33	(Venezuela) E. J. Viso	HVM Racing	60	+33.7 secs	10
7	3	(Brazil) Hélio Castroneves	Team Penske	60	+34.5 secs	6
8	27	(Japan) Hideki Mutoh	Andretti Green Racing	60	+55.7 secs	16
9	06	(United States) Graham Rahal	Newman/Haas/Lanigan Racing	60	+1:20.1 secs	13
10	15	(United States) Buddy Rice	Dreyer & Reinbold Racing	60	+1:31.9 secs	22
11	4	(United Kingdom) Dan Wheldon	Panther Racing	60	+1:31.9 secs	18
12	02	(United Kingdom) Justin Wilson	Newman/Haas/Lanigan Racing	60	+1:31.9 secs	9
13	26	(United States) Marco Andretti	Andretti Green Racing	60	+1:38.4 secs	14
14	14	(Brazil) Vítor Meira	A.J. Foyt Racing	59	+ 1 lap	11
15	18	(Brazil) Bruno Junqueira	Dale Coyne Racing	59	+ 1 lap	17
16	10	(United Kingdom) Dario Franchitti	Chip Ganassi Racing	59	+ 1 lap	4
17	2	(United States) A. J. Foyt IV	Vision Racing	58	+ 2 laps	24
18	7	(United States) Danica Patrick	Andretti Green Racing	58	+ 2 laps	23
19	34	(Brazil) Jaime Camara	Conquest Racing	58	+ 2 laps	20
20	20	(United States) Ed Carpenter	Vision Racing	57	Off course	19
21	11	(Brazil) Tony Kanaan	Andretti Green Racing	34	Mechanical	8
22	8	(Australia) Will Power	KV Racing Technology	16	Off course	1
23	23	(United States) Townsend Bell	Dreyer & Reinbold Racing	8	Contact	21
24	19	(Brazil) Mario Moraes	Dale Coyne Racing	7	Off course	12

== Support categories ==
The 2008 Nikon Indy 300 shared the top billing with Round 11 of the 2008 V8 Supercar Championship series, as well as three support categories.

Category	Round winner
V8 Supercar	Jamie Whincup (Ford BF Falcon)
Formula 3	John Martin (Dallara F307 Mercedes-Benz)
Australian Carrera Cup	James Moffat (Porsche 997 GT3 Cup)
Aussie Racing Cars	Paul Morris (Commodore-Yamaha)

== Notes ==
- It was the last held in Nikon Indy 300, starting for 2009, the race changed to a V8 Supercar race for 2009 and onwards.

Previous race: 2008 Peak Antifreeze Indy 300	IndyCar Series; 2008 season	Next race: 2009 Honda Grand Prix of St. Petersburg
Previous race: 2007 Lexmark Indy 300	2008 Nikon Indy 300	Next race: 2009 Nikon SuperGP
