= 2009 Nikon SuperGP =

Coordinates: 28.02°S 153.4°E

The 2009 Nikon SuperGP was an Australian motor racing meeting held on a street circuit in Surfers Paradise on Queensland's Gold Coast on 22–25 October 2009. It was to have featured the opening round of the 2009–10 A1 Grand Prix season, although A1 Grand Prix's involvement in the event was cancelled just five days prior to practice beginning.

The event did feature the eleventh event of the 2009 V8 Supercar Championship Series, the 2009 V8 Supercar Challenge. The program was altered from two 200-kilometre races for the Australian touring car series to four 150-kilometre races. Mark Winterbottom won two of the four races over the weekend with Garth Tander winning the second race on Saturday and Craig Lowndes winning the first race on Sunday. Tander and Winterbottom won each of the two days on combined point score.

Despite the extended V8 Supercar racing round and the last-minute inclusion of an "Australian Legends" parade featuring racing identities Dick Johnson, Kevin Bartlett, Jim Richards, Glenn Seton, Colin Bond and Bob Morris driving historic racing cars, valued in excess of $1 million each, the 2009 event failed to attract anywhere near the numbers of spectators of previous events and the A1GP no-show has resulted in two separate government inquiries into the event.

Surfers Paradise residents' groups are also lobbying for the event to be scrapped or relocated to a purpose-built facility, yet to be built. The Queensland tax payers are investing close to A$12 million into the event annually.

On 4 February 2010, the Queensland government announced that the SuperGP will be relaunched as the SuperCarnivale, an event developed and designed specifically for V8 Supercars. The announcement came after the release of two separate inquiries into the SuperGP event. Changes included shortening the event to three days instead of four and a shortening of the track.

The fallout from the highly critical reports has resulted in the contract between the Queensland government and the event organisers – The Gold Coast Motor Events Corporation (GCMEC) and the International Management Group (IMG) – being canceled. The contract had another four years to run and was worth $11.8 million annually. The QLD government therefore had to pay out $2.5 million as a settlement fee upon termination. The result was that Nikon SuperGP General Manager Greg Hooton and Nikon SuperGP Event Manager David Bennett, as well the support staff at the GCMEC/IMG event offices, were sacked and the office closed down.
