= Monaco aan de Maas =

- Time: 2005–2014
- Location: Rotterdam, Netherlands
- Also known as: Bavaria City Racing
- Type: Motorsport demonstration event
- Theme: Motorsport

Monaco aan de Maas (Monaco at the Maas) was a Formula One demonstration and parade of international racecars and racing drivers, held on the streets of Rotterdam, the Netherlands. In 2006 the event was renamed to Bavaria City Racing, also sometimes referred to as Bavaria City Racing Festival.

== First edition – Monaco aan de Maas 2005 ==
On 7 August 2005, the first edition of Monaco aan de Maas saw top Dutch racing drivers from classes as Formula One, Le Mans and the Paris-Dakar rally, such as Formula One drivers Christijan Albers and Robert Doornbos, who comes from Rotterdam. The Dutch Chinese driver Ho-Pin Tung had to retire after a few minutes due to problems on his car.

In the centre of Rotterdam, the track found its way along the Mariniersweg, the Blaak, the Coolsingel and the Hofplein. Though it was not possible to have a real race, it was a great opportunity to show the cars to the public.

Access to the event was mainly free. Only for the stands at the Coolsingel, and entrance to the paddock and the VIP-village, a fee was required.

The first edition was a big success. While the founders of the event, Robert Heilbron and Herman Vaanholt, expected 300,000 visitors, half a million race fans found their way to this unique event.

== Second edition – Bavaria City Racing 2006 ==
In 2006 500.000 visitors again found their way to the event on 20 August. For the second edition, the event has gotten a name change because of a new sponsor; the evenement is now called Bavaria City Racing. The track has also been changed: the Willemsbrug across the river Maas is now also added to the course. The piers of the bridge at the Noordereiland-side will be the start/finish. Via the Verlengde Willemsbrug, the Blaak and Coolsingel, the 2 kilometer long track will lead to Hofplein and back.

The event was once more mainly free to access. The stands this year are found at the Verlengde Willemsbrug. On the Willemsbrug and a small part before city hall on the Coolsingel, will be VIP stands.

Formula One driver Christijan Albers returned this year, and showed off his Midland Formula One car with his teammate Tiago Monteiro. Williams F1 also attended the event with their driver Nico Rosberg. A1 Grand Prix was there with former Formula One drivers Jos Verstappen in the A1GP Team The Netherlands car and Jan Lammers in the black multi-flagged A1GP World Cup of Motorsports car. Besides Formula One and A1 Grand Prix, there were also shows from Formula Three, Formula Renault, a parade of Historic Grand Prix race cars and demos from the Nuna 3 and Formula Zero. Dutch Formula 1 reporter Olav Mol and pitreporter Jack Plooij provided commentary for the public.

The pre-show once again featured the Drive for Kids, with Christijan Albers, Ho-Pin Tung and Nicky Pastorelli. In this parade the seats next to the drivers were sold, all proceeds went to KidsRights.

Dutch Formula One driver Robert Doornbos did not attend this year's event.

== Third edition – Bavaria City Racing 2007 ==
On 19 August 2007, the third edition of the event took place, attracting more than 500,000 people. For the first time since its organization, the weather stayed clear and without rain. The track remained the same as in 2006, but because of changing city plans the next event will have a different parcours.

The ING Renault F1 Team participated and brought their drivers Nelson Piquet Jr. and Heikki Kovalainen, while Minardi Team USA driver Robert Doornbos drove the old Lola ChampCar-chassis with 2007 Minardi Team USA livery. The charity ride Drive for Kids also returned in 2007, once more with all proceeds for KidsRights.

New in 2007 was the RaceSalon, an interactive exhibition which was organised on the two days preceding Bavaria City Racing. This exhibition took place in Rotterdam Ahoy on 17 and 18 August.
