= A1 Team Monaco =

Racing team from Monaco

- Monaco
- Founded: 2008
- Seat holder(s): Clivio Piccione; Hubertus Bahlsen
- Team principal: Graham Taylor
- Race driver(s): Clivio Piccione
- First race: 2008–09 Netherlands
- Rounds entered: 1
- Championships: 0
- Sprint race victories: 0
- Feature race victories: 0
- Pole positions: 0
- Fastest laps: 0
- Total points: 5
- 2008–09 position: 6th (5 pts)

A1 Team Monaco was the Monegasque team of A1 Grand Prix, an international racing series.

== Management ==
On 29 August 2008, it was announced that A1 Team Monaco would be competing in season four. The joint seat holders were Hubertus Bahlsen, and former F3 and GP2 driver Clivio Piccione – who also acted as the race driver.

== History ==
=== 2008–09 season ===
Driver: Clivio Piccione

Clivio Piccione was both a joint seat holder and the primary race driver for the team in the 2008–09 A1 Grand Prix season.

== Drivers ==
Name	Seasons	Races (Starts)	A1GP Title	Wins	Sprint wins	Main wins	2nd	3rd	Poles	Fastest Laps	Points
Clivio Piccione	2008–09	1 (2)									5

== Complete A1 Grand Prix results ==
(key) "spr" indicates the Sprint Race, "fea" indicates the Feature Race.

Year	Racing team	Chassis, Engine, Tyres	Drivers	1	2	3	4	5	6	7	8	9	10	11	12	13	14	Points	Rank
2008–09	A1 Team Monaco	Ferrari, Ferrari, Michelin		(Netherlands) NED		(China) CHN		(Malaysia) MYS		(New Zealand) NZL		(South Africa) RSA		(Portugal) POR		(United Kingdom) GBR		35	9th
2008–09	A1 Team Monaco	Ferrari, Ferrari, Michelin		spr	fea	spr	fea	spr	fea	spr	fea	spr	fea	spr	fea	spr	fea	35	9th
2008–09	A1 Team Monaco	Ferrari, Ferrari, Michelin	Clivio Piccione	Ret	6	9	7	12	Ret	16	Ret	5	3	5	Ret	Ret	4	35	9th
