= Robert Doornbos =

Dutch racing driver (born 1981)

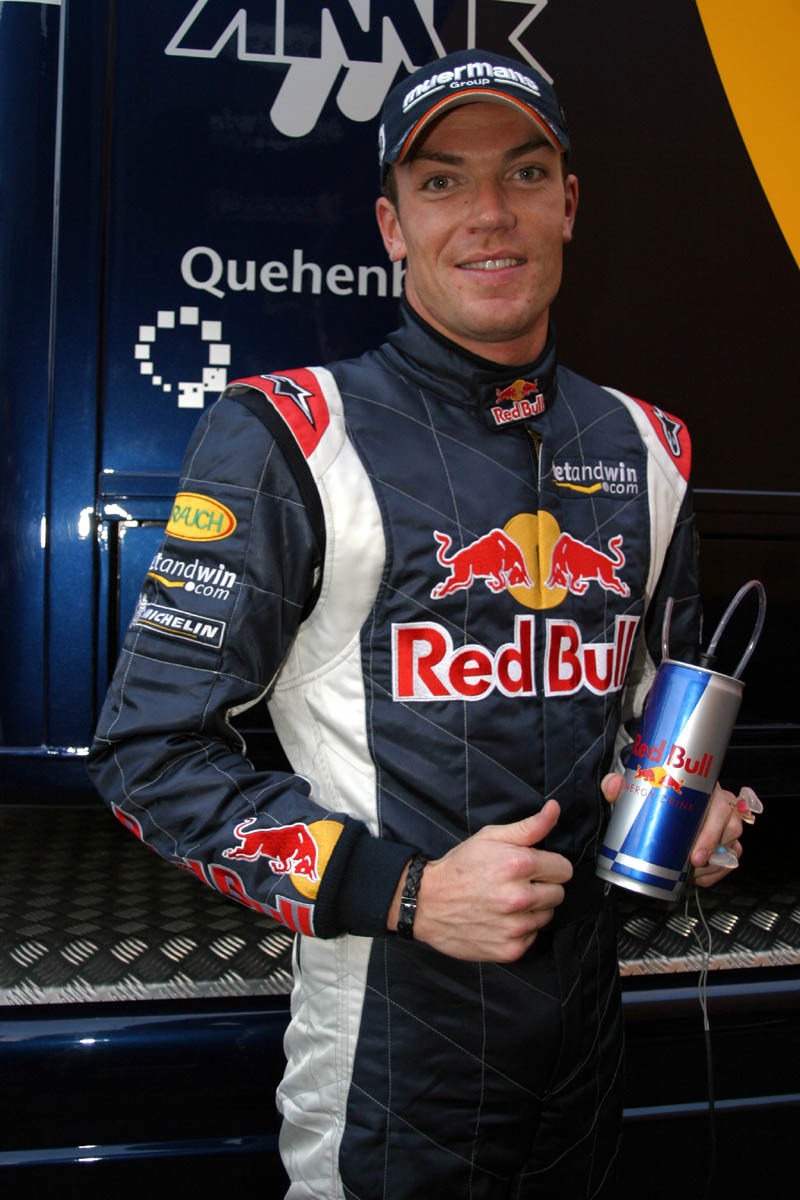
- Doornbos in 2006
- Born: Robert Michael Doornbos; 23 September 1981 (age 45) Rotterdam, Netherlands

Formula One World Championship career
- Nationality: (Monaco) Monégasque (2005) (Netherlands) Dutch (2006)
- Active years: 2005–2006
- Team(s): Minardi, Red Bull
- Entries: 11
- Championships: 0
- Wins: 0
- Podiums: 0
- Career points: 0
- Pole positions: 0
- Fastest laps: 0
- First entry: 2005 German Grand Prix
- Last entry: 2006 Brazilian Grand Prix

Champ Car career
- 14 races run over 1 year
- Years active: 2007
- Team: Minardi USA
- Best finish: 3rd – 2007
- First race: 2007 Vegas Grand Prix (Downtown Las Vegas)
- Last race: 2007 Gran Premio Tecate (Mexico City)
- First win: 2007 Mont-Tremblant Champ Car Grand Prix (Circuit Mont-Tremblant)
- Last win: 2007 San Jose Grand Prix (Streets of San Jose)
Wins	Podiums	Poles
2	6	0

Previous series
- 2009 2008–09 2008 2008 2007 2005–06 2004–07 2004 2003 2002–03 2001–02 2001, 2003 2000 2000 1999: IRL IndyCar Series; A1 Grand Prix; Superleague Formula; Rolex Sports Car Series; Champ Car World Series; Formula One; Formula One testing International Formula 3000; Formula Three Euroseries; Italian Formula Three Championship; German Formula Three Championship; British Formula 3 Championship; Formula Ford 1800 Benelux; Formula Ford Zetec Netherlands; Formula Vauxhall Lotus Winter Series

Robert Michael Doornbos (Dutch pronunciation: [ˈrɔbərt ˈmɑikəl ˈdoːr(ə)mbɔs]; born 23 September 1981 in Rotterdam) is a Dutch former racing driver who also competed with a Monégasque licence. He has been test and third driver for the Jordan and Red Bull Racing Formula One teams, as well as driving for Minardi and Red Bull Racing in 2005 and 2006. Doornbos then drove for Minardi Team USA in the 2007 and final season of the Champ Car World Series. He competed in the Superleague Formula racing series in 2008, and drove for the Netherlands team in A1 Grand Prix's 2008–2009 season. In 2009, Doornbos competed in the IndyCar Series. He began the season with Newman/Haas/Lanigan Racing, but switched to HVM Racing after the race in Kentucky Speedway.

== Tennis player to racing driver ==
Doornbos's first sport was tennis. His interest in motorsport grew after he was invited to the 1998 Belgian Grand Prix as a guest of Williams F1. It was 1997 Formula One Champion Jacques Villeneuve who suggested that he should go for a series such as Formula Ford, as he was too big and too old to race karts. He gave up tennis and focused on racing, joining the JR racing team for the 1999 Opel Lotus UK Winter series. He had a successful season, finishing second in the championship after taking four pole positions, four fastest laps and four wins. In 2000, he competed in the Formula Ford Zetec Benelux series, finishing second in the Belgian championship and fifth overall with one pole, three fastest laps and six podiums.

== Formula 3 career ==
Returning to the UK in 2001, Doornbos contested the Scholarship class of the British Formula Three championship with FGR Racing. He finished the year fifth in the championship, taking two poles, two wins and nine podiums. He drew attention to himself with a second-place finish in the Formula Three support race to the British Grand Prix. He then moved to the German Formula Three championship with Team Ghinzani. He picked up four podiums, but no win. The year also featured a sixth-place finish in the prestigious Macau Grand Prix. Continuing with the team in 2003, Doornbos competed in the European Formula Three Championship, visiting the podium seven times. He took pole position at Spa-Francorchamps for the Formula Three Masters event, and finished second in Korea.

== Formula 3000 ==
With support from Red Bull, Doornbos joined reigning International Formula 3000 champions Arden International for the 2004 FIA International Formula 3000 Championship. Partnered with Vitantonio Liuzzi, Doornbos claimed Rookie of the Year after finishing third in the championship. During the year, he took a fastest lap and four podium finishes, including a race win at Spa-Francorchamps.

== Formula One ==
=== Jordan (2004) ===
Prior to the 2004 Chinese Grand Prix, it was announced that Doornbos would be the official Friday test driver for the Jordan Formula One team, replacing Timo Glock, who had been promoted to race duties in place of Giorgio Pantano, whose sponsorship money had "dried up". Doornbos impressed as test driver for the final few races of the season, and was reappointed with the newly-sold Jordan team for the 2005 season.

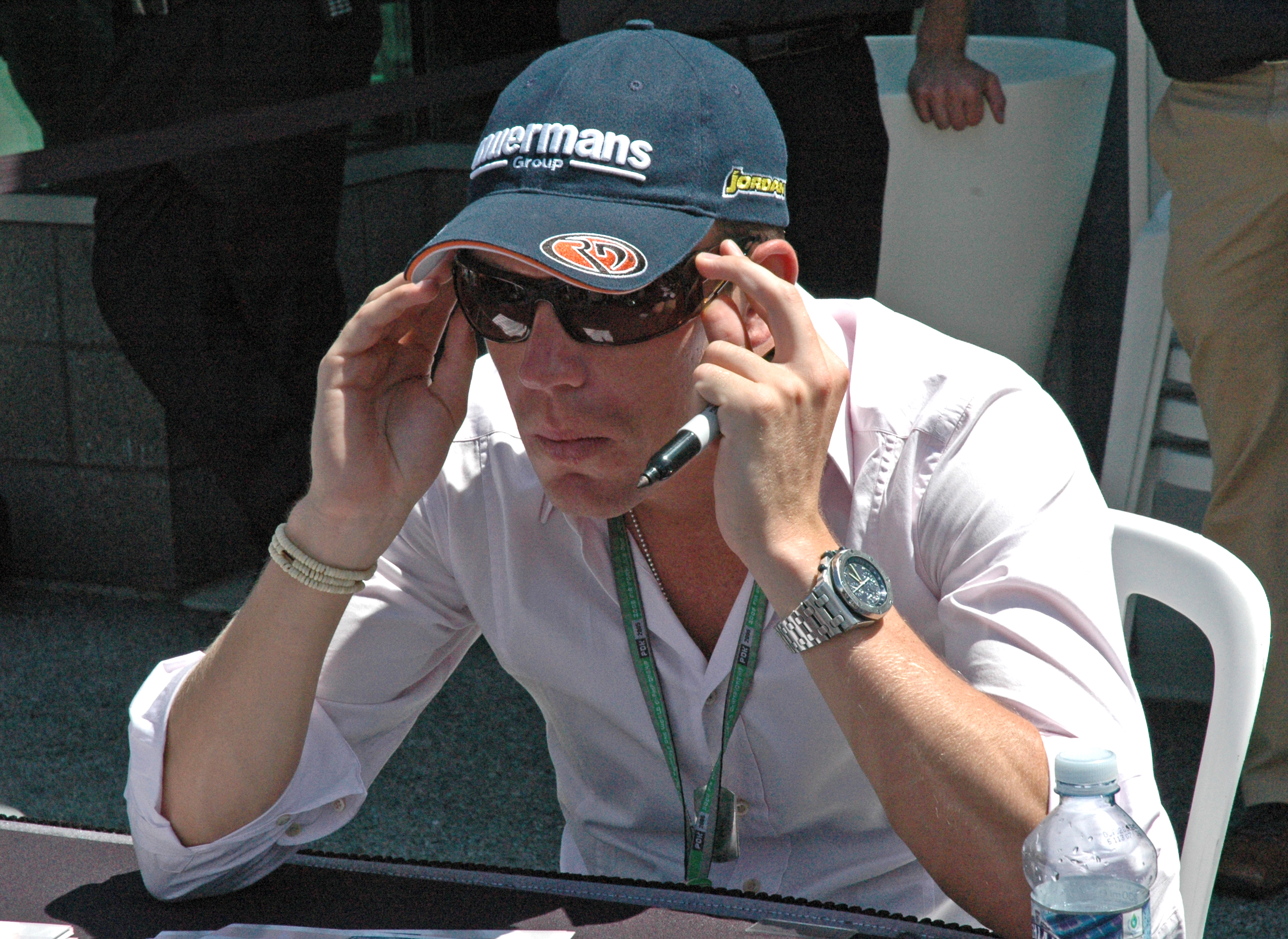
Doornbos at the 2005 United States Grand Prix

Doornbos completed Friday testing duties for Jordan in all but two of the first eleven events of the year, with French Renault F1 test driver Franck Montagny testing at the European Grand Prix, and Jordan being banned from using a third car at the Canadian Grand Prix after using too many tyres at the previous race.

=== Minardi (2005) ===
On 19 July, Doornbos was appointed as a Minardi race driver for the 2005 German Grand Prix onwards, replacing Austrian Patrick Friesacher, who had encountered sponsorship issues. In his first Formula One race, he collided with Jacques Villeneuve, the man who gave advice to Doornbos to start his career as a race driver. Doornbos raced a total of eight Grand Prix for the team, his best result being a 13th position in the Turkish and Belgian Grands Prix.

Doornbos and teammate Christijan Albers would have become the first all-Dutch team line-up since Carel Godin de Beaufort and Ben Pon drove together for the Ecurie Maarsbergen team at the 1962 Dutch Grand Prix at Zandvoort were it not for the fact that Doornbos raced with a Monegasque licence.

Effectively, Doornbos became Minardi's last Formula One driver, since the team was bought by Red Bull just before the Belgian Grand Prix. In the final race of the season, he retired on the final lap while Albers had retired a few laps earlier.

=== Red Bull (2006) ===
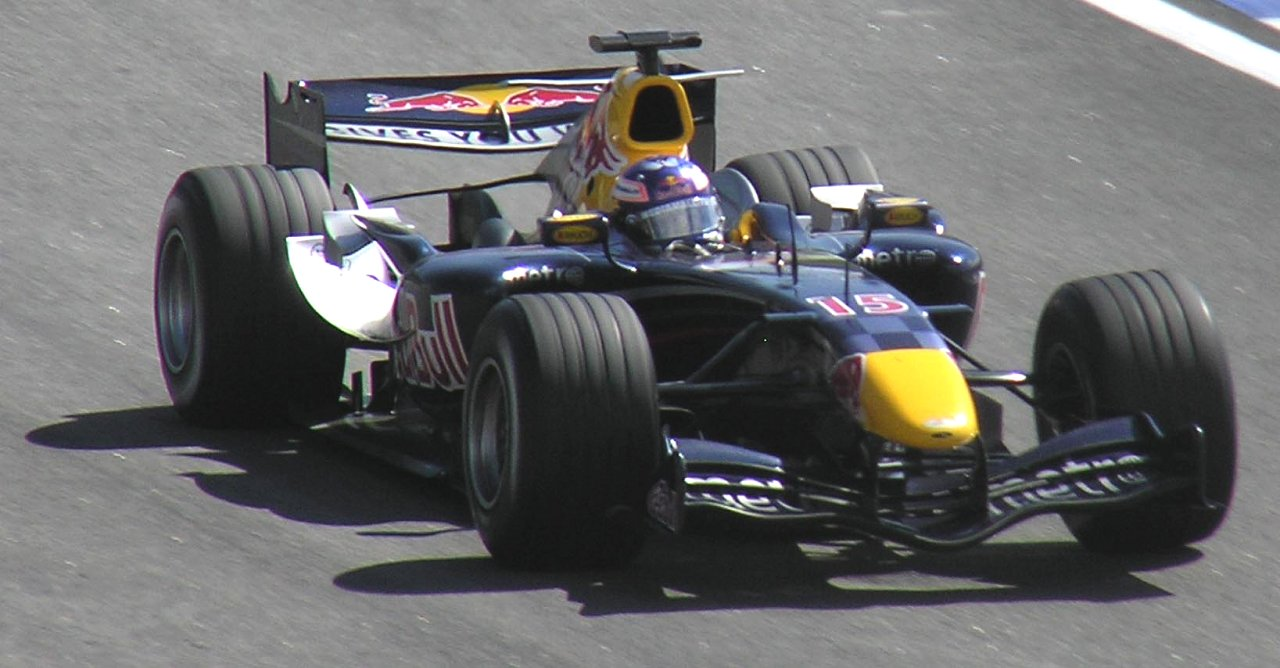
Doornbos driving for Red Bull Racing at the 2006 Brazilian Grand Prix.

The Minardi team ceased to exist in its previous form at the end of 2005, being bought out by Red Bull and becoming their Scuderia Toro Rosso team. Doornbos was unable to find a race drive for 2006, but Christian Horner, his former F3000 boss, had since been appointed as Sporting Director of Red Bull Racing, where he was appointed the team's test and reserve driver.

Doornbos thus spent most of 2006 testing at the racetracks on Fridays, ready to step into a race drive if either David Coulthard or Christian Klien were unable to race. In his role as the Red Bull test driver, he once more showed his talents as a racing driver. In the majority of the Grand Prix tests on Fridays, he was to be found in the top-ten, and a number of times he achieved a top-three time.

At the 2006 Hungarian Grand Prix, Doornbos was involved in a controversial incident with Fernando Alonso, which resulted in the Spaniard incurring a two-second qualifying penalty.

After the Italian Grand Prix, when Red Bull Racing announced that Klien had been dropped from the team, Doornbos was promoted to the second race driver role alongside Coulthard for the remaining three races. He entered with a bang by qualifying in the top-ten for his first race, in China. However, he touched Robert Kubica at the first corner during the race and the delay restricted him to 12th place at the finish.

Doornbos was subsequently signed as one of the team's test drivers for 2007, alongside Michael Ammermüller, with Coulthard and Mark Webber taking the race seats.

=== Formula One demonstrations ===
In his role as Formula One test and racing driver, Doornbos was given several demonstrations, both on tracks during other race events, as well as on public road. In the Netherlands, he has driven a Formula One car on public roads twice. In 2005, he was one of the drivers of the Monaco aan de Maas event in his hometown of Rotterdam. On 15 August 2006, Doornbos made the news with a fundraiser for the children of the 'Stichting Geluk en Vrijheid' (Foundation Happiness and Freedom). At a speed of 326 km/h (204 mph), he drove his Red Bull Formula One Car over the highway A7 on the Afsluitdijk in the Netherlands.

== Champ Car World Series ==
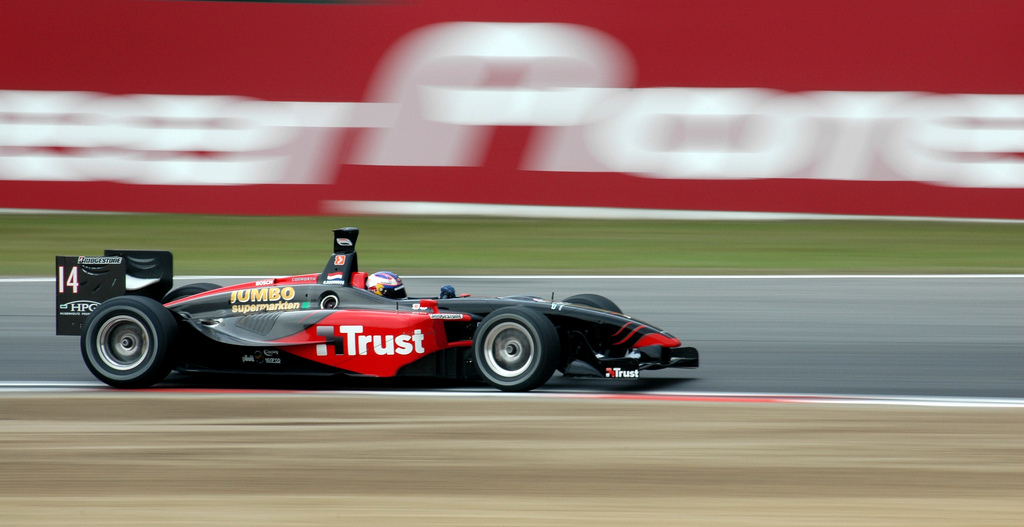
Doornbos competing with Minardi Team USA at the 2007 Belgian Champ Car Grand Prix

After missing a racing seat for the 2007 Formula One season, Doornbos signed a contract with Minardi Team USA for the 2007 Champ Car World Series season. He made a successful debut in the series in the first race of the season, the Vegas Grand Prix. After qualifying third, Doornbos finished on the podium, taking second place in the race. This made him the first rookie since Nigel Mansell in 1993 to make it to the podium in his first Champ Car race. A drive-through penalty in 2007 Grand Prix of Cleveland quite possibly cost Doornbos a chance at his first Champ Car victory, but he still managed a fine second place behind Paul Tracy. One week later, however, Doornbos won the 2007 Mont-Tremblant Grand Prix in Canada and as a result took the joint lead of the championship with Sébastien Bourdais. After scoring this victory, the ESPN broadcast team dubbed him "Bobby D" – a nickname he reportedly enjoys. He later went on to win the 2007 San Jose Grand Prix after an accident during the first lap on turn one left him without his front wing. The accident inadvertently put him on an alternate pit strategy that he used to his advantage and secured the win. Although he impressed many fans and drivers alike with his personality and driving style, Doornbos would end up third in points at season's end, although he did win Roshfrans Rookie of the Year. After the merger of the CCWS and the Indy Car Series was announced for 2008, the Minardi half of the team elected not to take part, reducing HVM Racing to a one-car team. This left Doornbos without a drive for 2008.

== Superleague Formula ==
After failing to secure a seat with competitive teams in the unified IndyCar Series, and refusing to drive for uncompetitive teams, Doornbos opted to sit out the 2008 season in search for a competitive seat in 2009. It was announced on 21 May 2008 that Doornbos would drive for A.C. Milan in the Superleague Formula, a newly created racing series where the cars are sponsored by football clubs. The club's technical director is the son of Giancarlo Minardi, former owner of the Minardi Formula One team under its take over by Paul Stoddart. Doornbos finished third in the inaugural 2008 season.

== A1 Grand Prix ==
Doornbos and Jeroen Bleekemolen drove together in A1 GP for Team Netherlands in the 2008–09 season. The drivers alternated races. Team Netherlands finished fourth in the championship, with both drivers having scored one victory, both in sprint races.

== IndyCar Series ==
Doornbos contested the 2009 IndyCar Series season with Newman/Haas/Lanigan Racing. Since he had no previous oval track racing experience, he has received coaching from fellow Dutchman Arie Luyendyk. Doornbos has finished no worse than twelfth in his first three races but the highlight has been a second place start in his first oval track race at Kansas (helped by disqualifications of Dario Franchitti and Hélio Castroneves for dipping below the white line during qualifying). Lining up beside his teammate Graham Rahal, Newman/Haas/Lanigan cars formed the front row for the first time since Milwaukee in 2006. He took the lead after the first round of pit stops, but on that first stop under yellow he bumped a stationary tyre in the pit stall ahead of him. He was penalised to the rear of the field and was no longer a factor.

On 4 August 2009, Doornbos posted on his official website that he was leaving Newman/Haas/Lanigan Racing effective immediately. He stated that there was the option for him to leave the team after 12 races and he decided to take it. He also said that he would like to stay in IndyCar and would announce his future plans shortly.

The following day on 5 August 2009, Doornbos signed with HVM Racing in the IndyCar Series for the remainder of the 2009 and to drive for the team through 2010, however this did not happen.

== After racing ==
Doornbos co-founded Kiiroo, a Dutch company involved in the production of sex toys.

Doornbos is currently active as a Formula 1 analyst for Ziggo Sport.

== Motorsports career results ==
=== Career summary ===
Season	Series	Team	Races	Poles	Wins	Points	Position
1999	Formula Ford 1800 Benelux	Team JR Racing	?	4	4	?	**2nd**
1999	Formula Vauxhall Lotus Winter Series	Team JR Racing	?	?	?	?	**2nd**
2000	Formula Ford 1800 Benelux	?	?	?	?	58	5th
2000	Formula Ford Zetec Netherlands	?	?	?	?	61	6th
2000	Formula Ford Festival	Sweeney/Hopper Racing	1	0	0	N/A	NC
2001	British Formula 3	Fred Goddard Racing (National Class)	26	1	2	182	5th
2001	German Formula Three	JB Motorsport	6	0	0	0	NC
2002	German Formula Three	Team Ghinzani	18	0	0	17	11th
2002	Italian Formula Three	Team Ghinzani	1	0	0	4	11th
2002	European Formula Three Cup	Team Ghinzani	1	0	0	N/A	11th
2002	Macau Grand Prix	Team Ghinzani	1	0	0	N/A	6th
2002	Korea Super Prix	Team Ghinzani	1	0	0	N/A	8th
2003	Formula Three Euroseries	Team Ghinzani	20	0	0	40	9th
2003	Italian Formula Three	Team Ghinzani	1	0	0	6	16th
2003	British Formula 3	Menu Motorsport	4	0	0	26	17th
2003	Macau Grand Prix	Menu Motorsport	2	0	0	N/A	16th
2003	Korea Super Prix	Menu Motorsport	1	0	0	N/A	**2nd**
2003	Masters of Formula Three	Team Ghinzani Euroc S.A.M.	1	0	0	N/A	18th
2004	International Formula 3000	Arden International	10	0	1	44	**3rd**
2004	Formula One	Jordan Ford	Test driver				
2005	Formula One	Jordan Grand Prix	Test driver				
2005	Formula One	Minardi F1 Team	8	0	0	0	25th
2006	Formula One	Red Bull Racing	3	0	0	0	24th
2007	Champ Car World Series	Minardi Team USA	14	0	2	268	**3rd**
2007	Formula One	Red Bull Racing	Test driver				
2008	Superleague Formula	A.C. Milan	9	2	2	267	**3rd (1)**
2008–09	A1GP	Team Netherlands	6	1	1	75 (1)	4th (1)
2009	IndyCar Series	Newman/Haas/Lanigan Racing	12	0	0	225	16th
2009	IndyCar Series	HVM Racing	5	0	0	225	16th

(1) = Team standings

=== Complete British Formula Three Championship results ===
(key) (Races in bold indicate pole position) (Races in italics indicate fastest lap)

Year	Entrant	Chassis	Engine	Class	1	2	3	4	5	6	7	8	9	10	11	12	13	14	15	16	17	18	19	20	21	22	23	24	25	26	27	DC	Pts
2001	Fred Goddard Racing	Dallara F398	Renault Sodemo	S	SIL1; 1; 21	SIL1; 2; 21	SNE; 1; 19	SNE; 2 Ret	DON1; 1 Ret	DON1; 2; 18	OUL; 1; 19	OUL; 2; 22	CRO; 1 Ret	CRO; 2; 17	ROC; 1; 19	ROC; 2; 17	CAS; 1; 19	CAS; 2 Ret	BRH1; 1; 17	BRH1; 2; 18	DON2; 1 Ret	DON2; 2; 19	KNO; 1; 4	KNO; 2 C	THR; 1; 14	THR; 2 Ret	THR; 3; 19	BRH2; 1; 19	BRH2; 2; 18	SIL2; 1 Ret	SIL2; 2 Ret	5th	182

=== Complete German Formula Three Championship/Formula Three Euro Series results ===
(key) (Races in bold indicate pole position) (Races in italics indicate fastest lap)

Year	Entrant	Chassis	Engine	1	2	3	4	5	6	7	8	9	10	11	12	13	14	15	16	17	18	19	20	DC	Pts
2001	JB Motorsport	Dallara F399	Opel	HOC1; 1	HOC1; 2	NÜR1; 1	NÜR1; 2	OSC; 1	OSC; 2	SAC; 1	SAC; 2	NOR; 1	NOR; 2	HOC2; 1	HOC2; 2	LAU; 1	LAU; 2	NÜR2; 1; 17	NÜR2; 2; 14	A1R; 1; 16	A1R; 2; 11	HOC2; 1; 15	HOC2; 2; 15	33rd	0
2002	Team Ghinzani	Dallara F302	Mugen-Honda	HOC1; 1; 23	HOC1; 2; 10	NÜR1; 1 C	NÜR1; 2 C	SAC; 1; 6	SAC; 2; 5	NOR; 1 Ret	NOR; 2; 6	LAU; 1; 2	LAU; 2; 23	HOC2; 1; 22†	HOC2; 1; 3	NÜR2; 1; 9	NÜR2; 2; 15	A1R; 1; 22†	A1R; 2; 8	ZAN; 1 Ret	ZAN; 2; 4	HOC3; 1; 7	HOC3; 2 Ret	11th	17
2003	Team Ghinzani	Dallara F302	Mugen-Honda	HOC; 1; 2	HOC; 2; 8	ADR; 1; 10	ADR; 2; 6	PAU; 1; 8	PAU; 2 DSQ	NOR; 1; 12	NOR; 2; 4	LMS; 1 NC	LMS; 2; 8	NÜR; 1; 3	NÜR; 2 Ret	A1R; 1; 10	A1R; 2; 8	ZAN; 1; 5	ZAN; 2; 7	HOC; 1; 13	HOC; 2 Ret	MAG; 1; 9	MAG; 2; 2	9th	40

=== Complete International Formula 3000 results ===
(key) (Races in bold indicate pole position) (Races in italics indicate fastest lap)

Year	Entrant	1	2	3	4	5	6	7	8	9	10	DC	Pts
2004	Arden International	IMO; 3	CAT; 14	MON; 6	NÜR; 2	MAG; 5	SIL; 10	HOC; 4	HUN; 7	SPA; 1	MNZ; 3	**3rd**	**44**

=== Complete Formula One results ===
(key) (Races in bold indicate pole position; races in italics indicate fastest lap)

Year	Entrant	Chassis	Engine	1	2	3	4	5	6	7	8	9	10	11	12	13	14	15	16	17	18	19	WDC	Pts
2004	Jordan Ford	Jordan EJ14	Ford RS2 3.0 V10	AUS	MAL	BHR	SMR	ESP	MON	EUR	CAN	USA	FRA	GBR	GER	HUN	BEL	ITA	CHN; TD	JPN; TD	BRA; TD		–	–
2005	Jordan Grand Prix	Jordan EJ15	Toyota RVX-05 3.0 V10	AUS; TD	MAL; TD	BHR; TD	SMR; TD	ESP; TD	MON; TD	EUR	CAN	USA; TD											25th	0
2005	Jordan Grand Prix	Jordan EJ15B	Toyota RVX-05 3.0 V10										FRA; TD	GBR; TD									25th	0
2005	Minardi F1 Team	Minardi PS05	Cosworth TJ2005 3.0 V10												GER; 18	HUN; Ret	TUR; 13	ITA; 18	BEL; 13	BRA; Ret	JPN; 14	CHN; 14†	25th	0
2006	Red Bull Racing	Red Bull RB2	Ferrari 056 2.4 V8	BHR; TD	MAL; TD	AUS; TD	SMR; TD	EUR; TD	ESP; TD	MON; TD	GBR; TD	CAN; TD	USA; TD	FRA; TD	GER; TD	HUN; TD	TUR; TD	ITA; TD	CHN; 12	JPN; 13	BRA; 12		24th	0

^{†} Did not finish the race, but was classified as he had completed more than 90% of the race distance.

=== American open-wheel racing results ===
(key) (Races in bold indicate pole position, races in italics indicate fastest race lap)

==== ChampCar ====
Year	Team	No.	Chassis	Engine	1	2	3	4	5	6	7	8	9	10	11	12	13	14	Rank	Pts	Ref
2007	Minardi Team USA	14	Panoz DP01	Cosworth XFE V8 t	LVS; 2	LBH; 13	HOU; 3	POR; 3	CLE; 2	MTT; 1	TOR; 6	EDM; 11	SJO; 1	ROA; 14	ZOL; 7	ASN; 13	SRF; 4	MXC; 16	**3rd**	**268**	

==== IndyCar Series ====
Year	Team	No.	Chassis	Engine	1	2	3	4	5	6	7	8	9	10	11	12	13	14	15	16	17	Rank	Pts	Ref
2009	Newman/Haas/Lanigan Racing	06	Dallara IR-05	Honda HI7R V8	STP; 11	LBH; 9	KAN; 12	INDY; 28	MIL; 14	TXS; 11	IOW; 15	RIR; 9	WGL; 9	TOR; 23	EDM; 9	KTY; 19						16th	283	
2009	HVM Racing	33	Dallara IR-05	Honda HI7R V8													MDO; 14	SNM; 10	CHI; 18	MOT; 16	HMS; 20	16th	283	

Years	Teams	Races	Poles	Wins	Podiums (Non-win)	Top 10s (Non-podium)	Indianapolis 500 Wins	Championships
1	2	17	0	0	0	5	0	0

==== Indianapolis 500 ====
Year	Chassis	Engine	Start	Finish	Team
2009	Dallara	Honda	23	28	N/H/L

=== Complete Superleague Formula results ===
(key) (Races in bold indicate pole position) (Races in italics indicate fastest lap)

Year	Team	1	2	3	4	5	6	7	8	9	10	11	12	13	14	15	16	17	18	19	20	21	22	23	24	Pos	Pts
2008	A.C. Milan Scuderia Playteam	DON; 1; 17	DON; 2 DNS	**NÜR**; **1**; 1	NÜR; 2; 6	ZOL; 1; 18	**ZOL**; **2**; 4	EST; 1; 2	EST; 2; 2	VLL; 1; 2	VLL; 2; 17	JER; 1; 1	JER; 2; 10													3rd	335
2010	SC Corinthians Azerti Motorsport	SIL; 1; 11	SIL; 2; 7	ASS; 1; 9	ASS; 2; 15	MAG; 1; 12	MAG; 2; 16	JAR; 1; 9	JAR; 2; 5	NÜR; 1; 7	NÜR; 2; 10	ZOL; 1; 3	ZOL; 2; 16	BRH; 1; 15	BRH; 2; 18	ADR; 1; 8	ADR; 2; 6	POR; 1; 6	POR; 2; 3	ORD; 1; 18	ORD; 2; 15	BEI; 1 DNS	BEI; 2 DNS	NAV; 1; 9	NAV; 2; 15	12th	363
2011	Netherlands Atech Reid Grand Prix	ASS; 1; 11	ASS; 2 DNS																							16th	16
2011	Japan Atech Reid Grand Prix			ZOL; 1; 5	ZOL; 2; 7																					2nd	136

† Non Championship round

==== Super Final results ====
(key) (Races in bold indicate pole position) (Races in italics indicate fastest lap)

Year	Team	1	2	3	4	5	6	7	8	9	10	11	12
2010	SC Corinthians Azerti Motorsport	SIL; DNQ	ASS; DNQ	MAG; DNQ	JAR; DNQ	NÜR; DNQ	ZOL; DNQ	BRH; DNQ	ADR; DNQ	**POR**; 5	ORD; DNQ	BEI; C	NAV; DNQ
2011	Netherlands Atech Reid Grand Prix	HOL; DNQ											
2011	Japan Atech Reid Grand Prix		BEL; 6										

=== Complete A1 Grand Prix results ===
(key) (Races in bold indicate pole position) (Races in italics indicate fastest lap)

Year	Entrant	1	2	3	4	5	6	7	8	9	10	11	12	13	14	DC	Pts	Ref
2008–09	Netherlands	NED; SPR	NED; FEA	CHN; SPR; 2	CHN; FEA; 16	MYS; SPR	MYS; FEA	NZL; SPR; 3	NZL; FEA; 5	RSA; SPR	RSA; FEA	POR; SPR; 1	**POR**; **FEA**; DNS	GBR; SPR	GBR; SPR	4th	81	

Awards
Preceded by Will Power	Champ Car Rookie of the Year; 2007	Succeeded by Final
Preceded by Koos de Ronde	Rotterdam Sportsman of the year 2005	Succeeded by Robin van Persie
