= 2008–09 A1 Grand Prix season =

A1 Grand Prix season

2008–09 A1 Grand Prix of Nations

Champions
- Champions: Ireland

Seasons
- ← 2007–08 ~~2009–10~~ →

The 2008–09 A1 Grand Prix season was the fourth and final season of A1 Grand Prix.

A1 Team Ireland became the fourth A1GP champions, after a title battle which went down to the final round in Great Britain. Ireland won with 112 points, with team driver Adam Carroll taking five victories at Chengdu, Sepang, Taupo and the series finale at Brands Hatch during the shortened 14 race season. Financial issues led to the cancellation of three events and ultimately the cancellation of the 2009–10 season.

== Calendar ==
Ten events were scheduled to be held in the 2008–09 series.

Round	Event	Circuit	Dates
C	~~A1 Grand Prix of Nations, Italy~~	~~Mugello Circuit~~	~~19–21 September 2008~~
1	A1 Grand Prix of Nations, Netherlands	Circuit Park Zandvoort	3–5 October 2008
2	A1 Grand Prix of Nations, China	Chengdu Goldenport Circuit	7–9 November 2008
3	A1 Grand Prix of Nations, Malaysia	Sepang International Circuit	21–23 November 2008
4	A1 Grand Prix of Nations, New Zealand	Taupo Motorsport Park	23–25 January 2009
C	~~A1 Grand Prix of Nations, Indonesia~~	~~Jakarta Street Circuit~~	~~6–8 February 2009~~
5	A1 Grand Prix of Nations, South Africa	Kyalami Circuit	20–22 February 2009
6	A1 Grand Prix of Nations, Portugal	Algarve International Circuit	10–12 March 2009
7	(United Kingdom) A1 Grand Prix of Nations, Great Britain	Brands Hatch	1–3 May 2009
C	~~A1 Grand Prix of Nations, Mexico~~	~~Autódromo Hermanos Rodríguez~~	~~22–24 May 2009~~
Map
2008–09 A1 Grand Prix season is located in Earth

=== Cancellations ===
On 21 August 2008, the Italian round at Mugello was postponed following a delay in the build schedule of the new chassis. A replacement date was not announced and the event was never held.

Further timetable changes were announced on 26 August 2008. The Chinese round was confirmed to be held at Chengdu Goldenport Circuit, and swapped places in the calendar with the Indonesian round at Jakarta. Subsequent to that, the Indonesian race was moved back further, to 8 February due to track construction. The Indonesian round was later cancelled on 16 January due to the circuit missing a construction deadline.

On 9 September 2008, Brands Hatch was confirmed as hosting the British round at the end of the season. On 19 December, Interlagos was announced as the season finale on the weekend of 15–17 May 2009. On 5 March, the Interlagos race was removed from the circuit's official calendar – making Brands Hatch the finale.

The Mexican round was also moved back by one week, so as to avoid clashing with a concert held in the baseball stadium inside the circuit on the original date. On 17 February 2009, an official preview reported that the Mexico City round was no longer to take place on the weekend of 20–22 March and a replacement date was being sought. eTicket.com.mx advertised the event as it should take place on the weekend of 22–24 May, and was confirmed on 31 March 2009, subject to the FIA-stipulated changes to the Peraltada corner. On 29 April 2009, the Mexican round was cancelled due to an outbreak of swine flu.

== Entry list ==
Teams representing Monaco and South Korea joined the grid, whilst the Czech Republic left the series. Canada and Pakistan appeared on the pre-season entry list, but did not participate in any rounds.

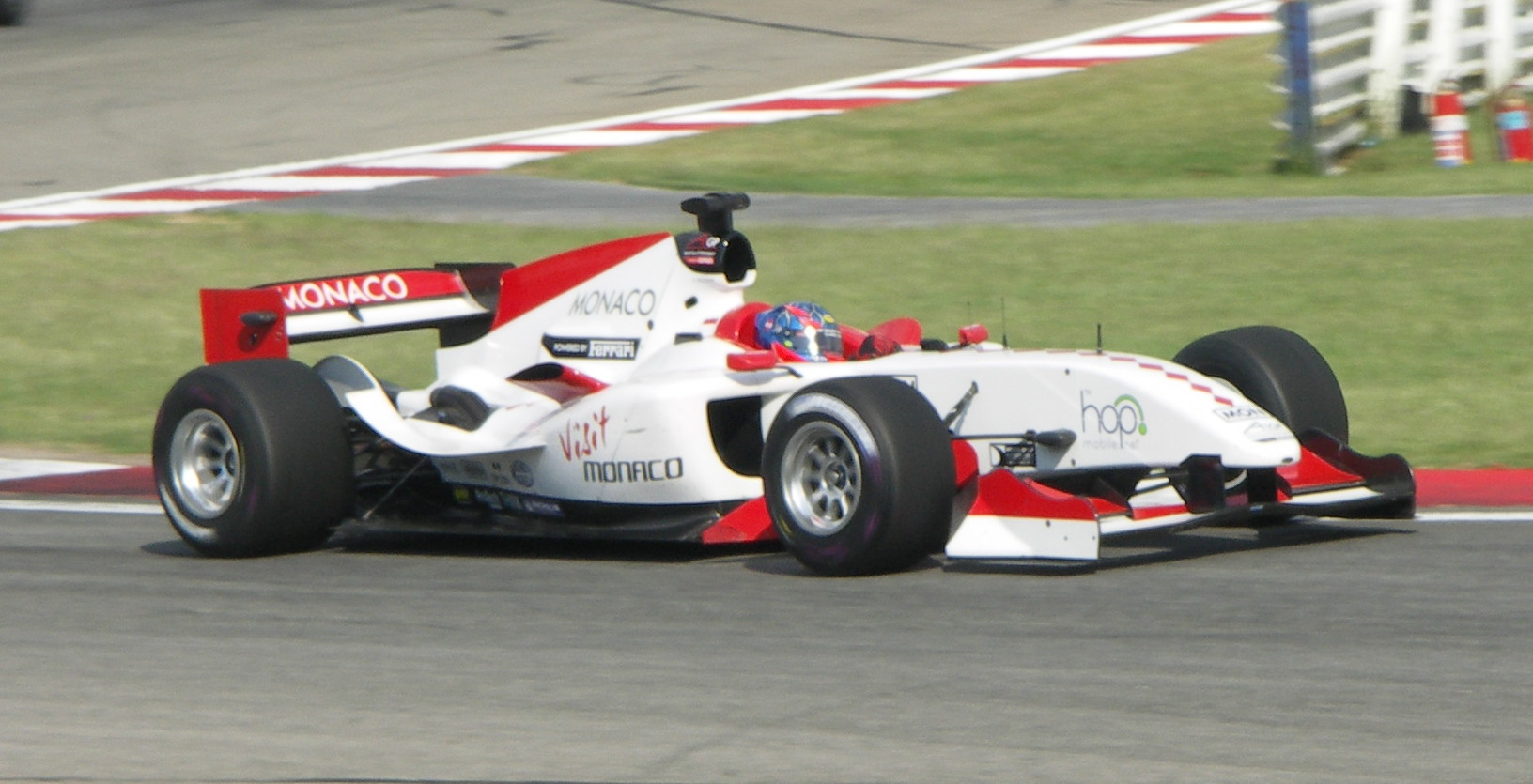
Monaco made their series debut.

Entrant (Team)	Driver	Events
(Australia) A1 Team Australia; Alan Docking Racing	John Martin	All
(Brazil) A1 Team Brazil; David Sears Motorsport	Felipe Guimarães	All
(Canada) A1 Team Canada; Status Grand Prix	Daniel Morad	None
(China) A1 Team China; Team Astromega	Ho-Pin Tung	1–3, 5–6
(China) A1 Team China; Team Astromega	Congfu Cheng	4, 7
(France) A1 Team France; DAMS	Loïc Duval	1, 3–4
(France) A1 Team France; DAMS	Nicolas Prost	2, 5–7
(Germany) A1 Team Germany; GU-Racing International	Michael Ammermüller	5, 7
(Germany) A1 Team Germany; GU-Racing International	André Lotterer	6
(United Kingdom) A1 Team Great Britain; GU-Racing International (Note: A1 Team Great Britain operated itself for the first five rounds, after which it fell into administration. GU-Racing International were employed by the series to prepare the car for the final two events.)	Danny Watts	2–3, 5
(United Kingdom) A1 Team Great Britain; GU-Racing International	Dan Clarke	4, 6–7
(India) A1 Team India; Argo Racing Cars	Narain Karthikeyan	2–7
(Indonesia) A1 Team Indonesia; Performance Racing	Satrio Hermanto	1–4, 7
(Indonesia) A1 Team Indonesia; Performance Racing	Zahir Ali	5–6
(Republic of Ireland) A1 Team Ireland; Status Grand Prix	Adam Carroll	All
(Italy) A1 Team Italy; Team Ghinzani	Fabio Onidi	1
(Italy) A1 Team Italy; Team Ghinzani	Edoardo Piscopo	2–5
(Italy) A1 Team Italy; Team Ghinzani	Vitantonio Liuzzi	6–7
(South Korea) A1 Team Korea; Carlin Motorsport	Hwang Jin-woo	1–3
(South Korea) A1 Team Korea; Carlin Motorsport	Lee Kyung-woo	5
(Lebanon) A1 Team Lebanon; Argo Racing Cars	(Canada) Daniel Morad	All
A1 Team Malaysia	Fairuz Fauzy	1–6
A1 Team Malaysia	Aaron Lim	7
(Mexico) A1 Team Mexico; Campos Racing	David Garza	2–3
(Mexico) A1 Team Mexico; Campos Racing	Salvador Durán	4–7
A1 Team Monaco	Clivio Piccione	All
(Netherlands) A1 Team Netherlands; Racing for Holland	Jeroen Bleekemolen	1, 3, 5, 7
(Netherlands) A1 Team Netherlands; Racing for Holland	Robert Doornbos	2, 4, 6
A1 Team New Zealand; David Sears Motorsport	Earl Bamber	1, 3, 5–7
A1 Team New Zealand; David Sears Motorsport	Chris van der Drift	2, 4
(Pakistan) A1 Team Pakistan; Teamcraft Motorsport	Adam Khan	None
(Portugal) A1 Team Portugal; Boer Racing Services	Filipe Albuquerque	All
(South Africa) A1 Team South Africa; DAMS	Adrian Zaugg	1–6
(South Africa) A1 Team South Africa; DAMS	Alan van der Merwe	7
(Switzerland) A1 Team Switzerland; Boer Racing Services	Neel Jani	All
(United States) A1 Team USA; Andretti Green Racing	Charlie Kimball	1
(United States) A1 Team USA; Andretti Green Racing	Marco Andretti	2–6
(United States) A1 Team USA; Andretti Green Racing	J.R. Hildebrand	7

== Rule changes ==
=== Technical changes ===
- On 11 October 2007, A1GP and Ferrari announced a six-year collaboration on the new generation of A1GP cars. The new "Powered by Ferrari" car is a modification of the Formula One Ferrari F2004 chassis with a V8 Ferrari engine producing 600 bhp. The car was officially revealed and driven for the first time by John Watson in May 2008. Michelin supplied the tyres for the new car.

=== Sporting changes ===
- The four qualifying sessions were reduced in length from fifteen minutes to ten minutes each.
- Teams may now utilise a "joker" qualifying lap (from Malaysia onwards). In one of the four qualifying sessions the team may elect to utilise their joker – for the flying lap in that session, the driver is granted the availability of the PowerBoost button for the entire lap.
- A mandatory pit-stop was added to the Sprint Race, brought into effect starting in Malaysia. Sprint Race time certainty was decreased to 24 minutes + 1 lap

== Results and standings ==
=== Results summary ===
Round		Event	Pole position	Fastest lap	Winner	Report
1	S	Netherlands	(Netherlands) Jeroen Bleekemolen	(France) Loïc Duval	(Malaysia) Fairuz Fauzy	Report
1	F	Netherlands	(Malaysia) Fairuz Fauzy	(United States) Charlie Kimball	(France) Loïc Duval	Report
2	S	China	(Republic of Ireland) Adam Carroll			Report
2	F	China	(United Kingdom) Danny Watts	(Netherlands) Robert Doornbos	(Portugal) Filipe Albuquerque	Report
3	S	Malaysia	(Switzerland) Neel Jani	(Switzerland) Neel Jani	(Switzerland) Neel Jani	Report
3	F	Malaysia	(Republic of Ireland) Adam Carroll			Report
4	S	New Zealand	(Republic of Ireland) Adam Carroll	(Switzerland) Neel Jani	(Republic of Ireland) Adam Carroll	Report
4	F	New Zealand	(Republic of Ireland) Adam Carroll	(Portugal) Filipe Albuquerque	(Switzerland) Neel Jani	Report
5	S	South Africa	(Netherlands) Jeroen Bleekemolen	(Portugal) Filipe Albuquerque	(Netherlands) Jeroen Bleekemolen	Report
5	F	South Africa	(Monaco) Clivio Piccione	(Malaysia) Fairuz Fauzy	(Switzerland) Neel Jani	Report
6	S	Portugal	(Italy) Vitantonio Liuzzi	(Republic of Ireland) Adam Carroll	(Netherlands) Robert Doornbos	Report
6	F	Portugal	(Netherlands) Robert Doornbos	(Republic of Ireland) Adam Carroll	(Switzerland) Neel Jani	Report
7	S	(United Kingdom) Great Britain	(Republic of Ireland) Adam Carroll			Report
7	F	(United Kingdom) Great Britain	(Republic of Ireland) Adam Carroll	(Australia) John Martin	(Republic of Ireland) Adam Carroll	Report

=== Championship standings ===
Points system

The Sprint Race awards points to the top eight positions as opposed to the top ten in the 2007–08 season. The teams that competed in all 7 events were required to drop their worst round pointscore as a number of teams missed the season-opener in Zandvoort due to delays in producing the new chassis.

Position	1st	2nd	3rd	4th	5th	6th	7th	8th	9th	10th	FL	Ref
Sprint	10	8	6	5	4	3	2	1			1	
Feature	15	12	10	8	6	5	4	3	2	1	1	

Championship standings

Pos	Team	Drivers	(Netherlands) NED		(China) CHN		(Malaysia) MLY		(New Zealand) NZL		(South Africa) RSA		(Portugal) POR		(United Kingdom) GBR		Gross	Drop	Pts
Pos	Team	Drivers	S	F	S	F	S	F	S	F	S	F	S	F	S	F	Gross	Drop	Pts
1	(Republic of Ireland) Ireland	Adam Carroll	Ret	Ret	**1**	2	5	**1**	**1**	**2**	4	Ret	2	5	**1**	**1**	112		112
2	Switzerland	Neel Jani	5	Ret	4	4	**1**	Ret	2	1	3	1	15	1	8	3	99	4	95
3	Portugal	Filipe Albuquerque	9	Ret	6	1	4	2	6	3	2	5	3	2	5	5	92		92
4	Netherlands	Jeroen Bleekemolen	**4**	5			6	8			**1**	4			6	2	81	6	75
4	Netherlands	Robert Doornbos			2	16			3	5			1	**DNS**			81	6	75
5	France	Loïc Duval	3	1			2	14	4	6							47		47
5	France	Nicolas Prost			8	Ret					10	Ret	13	6	9	10	47		47
6	Malaysia	Fairuz Fauzy	1	**2**	13	5	15	10	8	10	9	NC	8	3			43		43
6	Malaysia	Aaron Lim													16	Ret	43		43
7	New Zealand	Earl Bamber	2	3			3	6			8	Ret	Ret	Ret	Ret	Ret	36		36
7	New Zealand	Chris van der Drift			7	11			5	13							36		36
8	Australia	John Martin	12	4	11	6	8	4	Ret	4	12	13	10	12	7	8	36		36
9	Monaco	Clivio Piccione	Ret	6	9	7	12	Ret	16	Ret	5	**3**	5	Ret	Ret	4	35		35
10	(United Kingdom) Great Britain	Danny Watts			3	**3**	Ret	16			Ret	7					28		28
10	(United Kingdom) Great Britain	Dan Clarke							12	12			11	7	13	7	28		28
11	United States	Charlie Kimball	8	10													24		24
11	United States	Marco Andretti			15	8	Ret	3	11	11	17	8	12	Ret			24		24
11	United States	J.R. Hildebrand													4	14	24		24
12	India	Narain Karthikeyan			10	10	Ret	Ret	9	7	6	12	6	11	2	Ret	19		19
13	Mexico	Davíd Garza			16	15	14	15									19		19
13	Mexico	Salvador Durán							15	Ret	16	Ret	9	4	3	6	19		19
14	South Africa	Adrian Zaugg	6	Ret	5	9	9	5	10	9	7	Ret	17	Ret			19		19
14	South Africa	Alan van der Merwe													15	11	19		19
15	Brazil	Felipe Guimarães	14	Ret	20	Ret	Ret	7	14	15	15	2	7	DNS	DNS	DNS	18		18
16	Italy	Fabio Onidi	7	Ret													17		17
16	Italy	Edoardo Piscopo			14	Ret	7	11	7	8	11	10					17		17
16	Italy	Vitantonio Liuzzi											**4**	Ret	10	9	17		17
17	Lebanon	(Canada) Daniel Morad	10	8	12	13	11	12	Ret	Ret	NC	6	Ret	Ret	Ret	12	8		8
18	China	Ho-Pin Tung	13	9	17	12	10	9			13	Ret	16	8			7		7
18	China	Congfu Cheng							Ret	14					14	Ret	7		7
19	(South Korea) Korea	Hwang Jin-Woo	Ret	7	19	17	DNS	DNS									4		4
19	(South Korea) Korea	Lee Kyung-woo									DNA	DNA					4		4
20	Indonesia	Satrio Hermanto	Ret	Ret	18	14	13	13	13	Ret					12	13	3		3
20	Indonesia	Zahir Ali									18	9	14	10			3		3
21	Germany	Michael Ammermüller									14	11			11	Ret	2		2
21	Germany	André Lotterer											Ret	9			2		2
Pos	Team	Drivers	S	F	S	F	S	F	S	F	S	F	S	F	S	F	Gross	Drop	Pts
Pos	Team	Drivers	(Netherlands) NED		(China) CHN		(Malaysia) MLY		(New Zealand) NZL		(South Africa) RSA		(Portugal) POR		(United Kingdom) GBR		Gross	Drop	Pts

Colour	Result
Gold	Winner
Silver	2nd place
Bronze	3rd place
Green	Finished, in points
Green	Retired, in points
Blue	Finished, no points
Purple	Did not finish (Ret)
Purple	Not classified (NC)
Red	Did not qualify (DNQ)
Black	Disqualified (DSQ)
White	Did not start (DNS)
White	Withdrew (WD)
Blank	Did not participate
Blank	Injured (INJ)
Blank	Excluded (EX)
**Bold**	Pole position
*	Fastest lap
spr	Sprint Race
fea	Feature Race
