= Lippo Village International Formula Circuit =

Defunct street circuit in Lippo Village Tangerang, Indonesia

- Location: Tangerang, Banten Province, Indonesia
- Coordinates: 6°13′44.6″S 106°36′31.1″E
- Broke ground: 2008
- Opened: 8 February 2009; 17 years ago
- Closed: 2011
- Construction cost: $ 150 million
- Surface: Asphalt
- Length: 3.200 km (1.988 mi)
- Turns: 12
- Race lap record: 1:53:338 (Sunny TS, Honda Jazz, 2009)

The Lippo Village International Formula Circuit is a defunct street circuit in Lippo Village, Tangerang, Indonesia. The track was confirmed to host a round of the 2008–09 A1 Grand Prix season, set for the weekend of 8 February 2009.

On 29 August 2008, further details regarding the track were announced. Designed by Hermann Tilke, the track would be made by modifying parts of the village near the Pelita Harapan University and includes the Supermal. It is located at the centre of Lippo Village's hub. Tilke attempted to keep disruption minimal to the village during the races with ensuring that track's maximum speed to be more than 308 km/h with the average speed of 176 km/h. Part of the university's planned extension buildings would be utilized to double the pit lane capacity during the A1GP races. The track would be showcasing Lippo Village and the surrounding businesses.

However, the event was cancelled because the local promoter and organisers, who are responsible to the project of track construction, have failed to meet the requisite completion deadlines and the track is not yet able to homologate by the FIA before 6–8 February 2009. The track was used for some local racing events during the early-2010s, but has since fallen out of use and defunct as of 2012. The pits and the track sign remained until 2016, and most portions of the track currently accommodates the parking lot for Pelita Harapan University.

As of 2016, the track's layout remained intact, but most of the track's features had been removed, including the pit lane border and starting lights; the pit lane itself is now demolished and other parts of the track has undergone several modifications to accommodate an additional parking area for MaxxBox Mall, another shopping mall across Supermal Karawaci. There are now large trees covering the empty area surrounding one portion of the track, including the one near a mosque. The paddock building has been renovated and currently utilized as an extension of the university, which houses additional classrooms and a computer laboratory.

The defunct track is now superseded by BSD City Grand Prix, a street circuit built on Bumi Serpong Damai, Tangerang.

== Lap records ==
Category	Time	Driver	Team	Vehicle	Event
Grand Prix Circuit (2009–2011): 3.200 km
GT Lippo Village	1:53.388	Sunny TS	Honda Jakarta Center Petronas Racing Team	Honda Jazz	Lippo Village GT Championship 2009
