= Fairuz Fauzy =

Malaysian professional race car driver

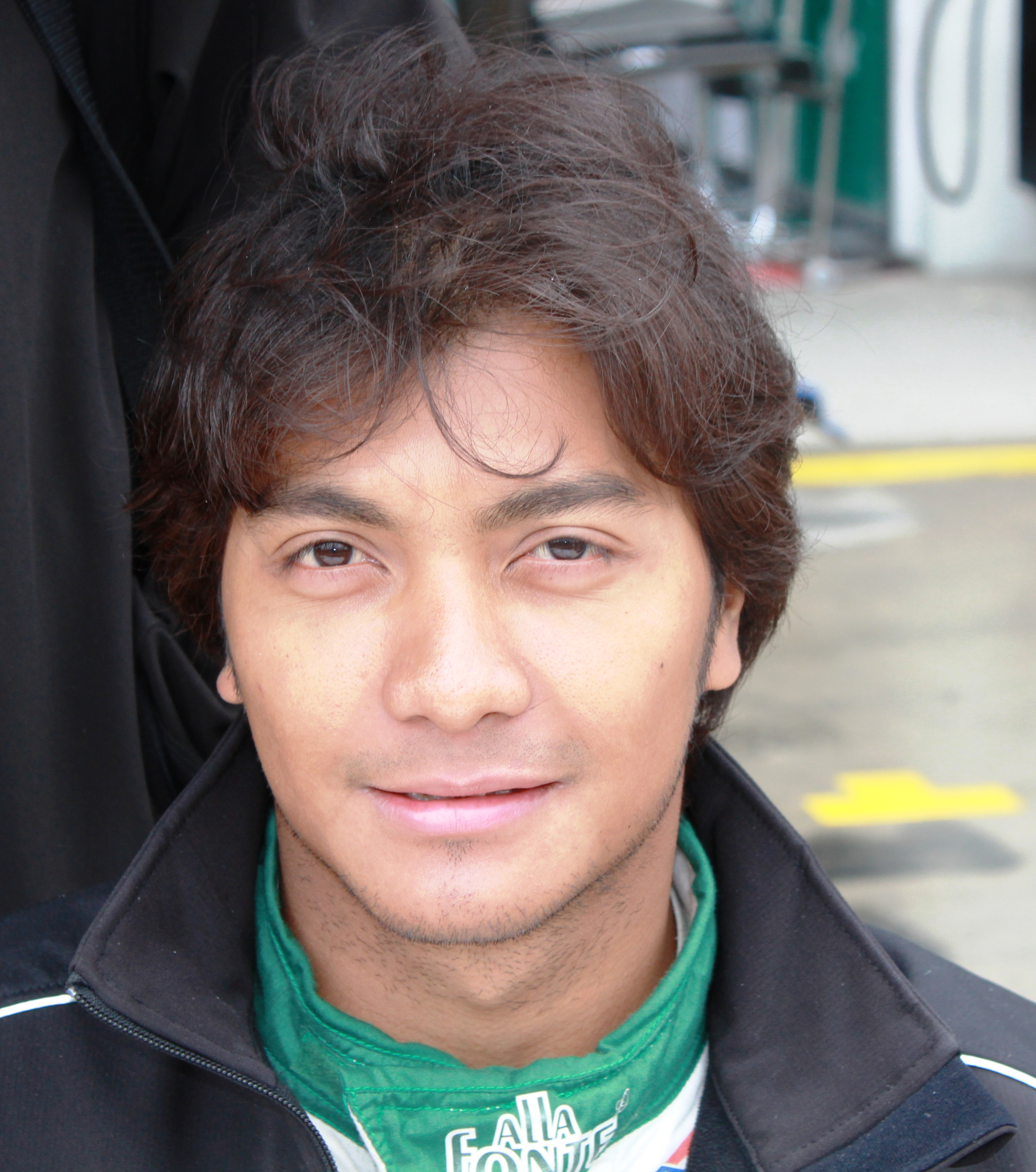
- Fairuz at the 2011 Nürburgring World series by Renault round
- Nationality: Malaysian
- Born: Mohamed Fairuz bin Mohamed Fauzy; 24 October 1982 (age 44) Kuala Lumpur, Malaysia

GP2 Series career
- Debut season: 2005
- Current team: Super Nova Racing
- Categorisation: FIA Gold
- Car number: 16
- Former teams: DAMS
- Starts: 62
- Wins: 0
- Poles: 0
- Fastest laps: 0
- Best finish: 16th in 2011

Previous series
- 2008, 2011 2007–08, 2008–09 2007–09 2005–06 2002–2004 2001 2000: GP2 Asia Series; A1 Grand Prix FRenault 3.5 Series; A1 Grand Prix; British Formula 3 Formula Renault 2.0 UK; British Formula Ford

Mohamed Fairuz bin Mohamed Fauzy (born 24 October 1982) is a Malaysian former professional race car driver.

== Early career ==
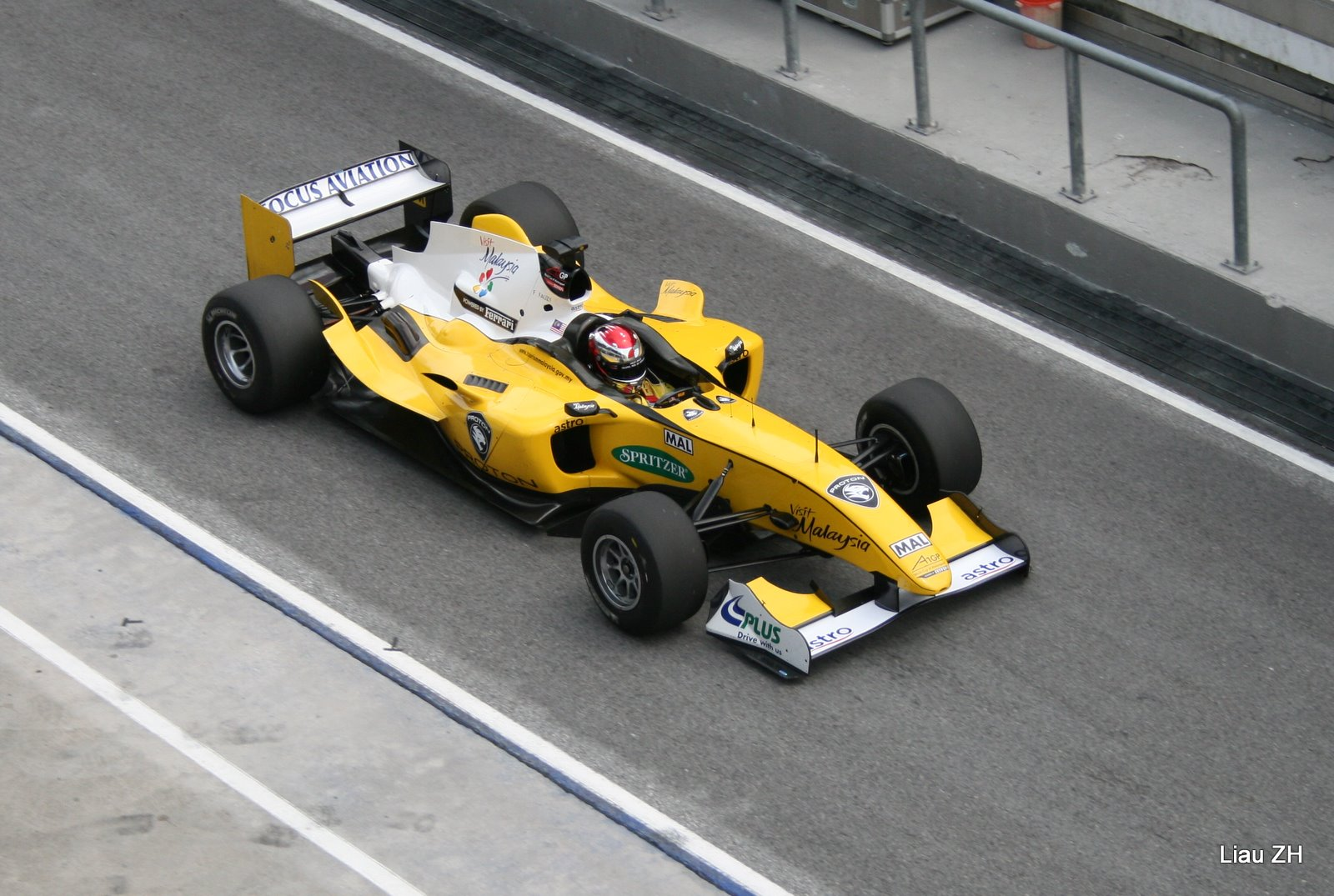
Fairuz driving for A1 Team Malaysia in the 2008-09 A1 Grand Prix season.

Fairuz started competing in karting events in 1994 before making the move to British Formula Ford at the start of 1999. He moved to British Formula Renault in 2000, developing his skills there before moving up to British Formula 3 in 2002, albeit in the B-Class.

Fairuz moved up to the main class in 2003, driving for both the SYR and Promatecme teams, before driving for both the Menu and P1 teams in 2004. He moved to the GP2 Series for 2005, becoming one of a number of Asian drivers in the championship. Despite being the only driver to start every race and not score a point, he continued in the series for 2006, again scoring no points. During this time, he was also one of A1 Team Malaysia's drivers (along with Alex Yoong) in the A1 Grand Prix series.

Fairuz raced in the Formula Renault 3.5 Series for the Cram Competition team.

Fairuz returned to GP2 for 2008, driving for the Super Nova team in the GP2 Asia Series. In 2009, he competed in the Formula Renault 3.5 Series for Mofaz Racing. After entering the final race in sixth place, Fairuz finished second in the race at the Ciudad del Motor de Aragón and leapfrogged the four drivers above him, to finish as runner-up to Bertrand Baguette in the championship standings.

== Formula One ==
Fairuz was confirmed as one of Spyker F1's test and reserve drivers for 2007, Fairuz was tipped for a Lotus Racing reserve seat for 2010. On 9 November 2009 Lotus Racing chief technical officer Mike Gascoyne confirmed Fairuz would be the test driver for the team but cooled down talks he was going to get a race seat.

Fairuz was announced as the third driver for Lotus on 13 December 2009.

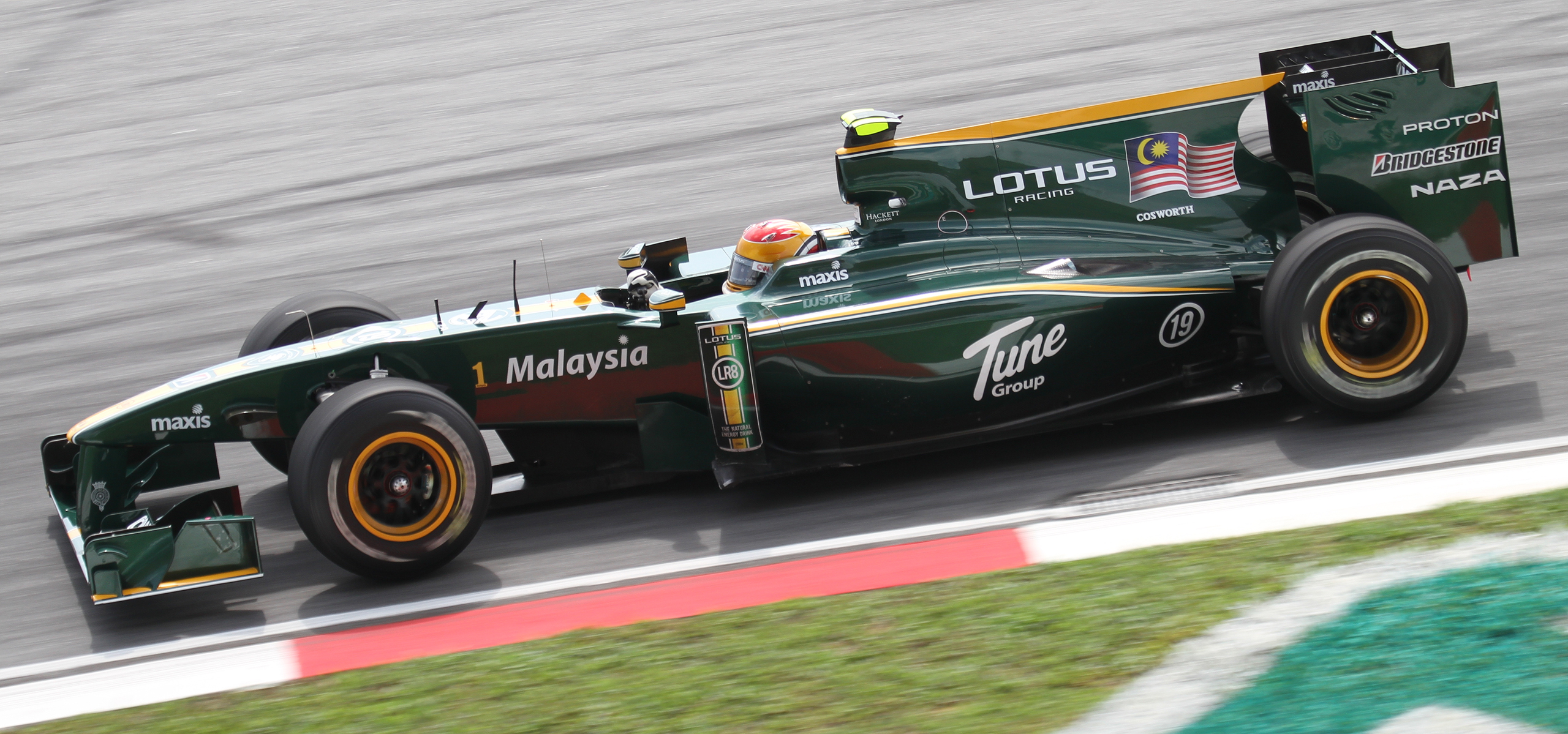
Fairuz during first practice at the 2010 Malaysian Grand Prix.

Fairuz replaced Heikki Kovalainen in the first free practice session at the 2010 Malaysian Grand Prix, as Jarno Trulli won a coin toss against Kovalainen. He drove a total of nineteen laps during the session, setting the 22nd fastest time, beating the Hispania Racing cars of Karun Chandhok and Bruno Senna. He also took part in the first practice session at the British Grand Prix, replacing Jarno Trulli, where he set the 23rd fastest time (1:39.510) ahead of the Hispania Racing car of Sakon Yamamoto. He replaced Heikki Kovalainen for the first free practice session of the German Grand Prix and the Abu Dhabi Grand Prix. At the end of the 2010 season, Fairuz parted company with Lotus Racing after one year of his five-year contract.

The relationship between Lotus Racing and Group Lotus soured during 2010, resulting in GL deciding to withdraw its backing from the team and instead sponsoring Renault F1 for the 2011 season onwards. As part of the deal, Fairuz became one of Renault's test and reserve drivers, alongside Bruno Senna, Romain Grosjean and Ho-Pin Tung.

== Post-Formula One ==
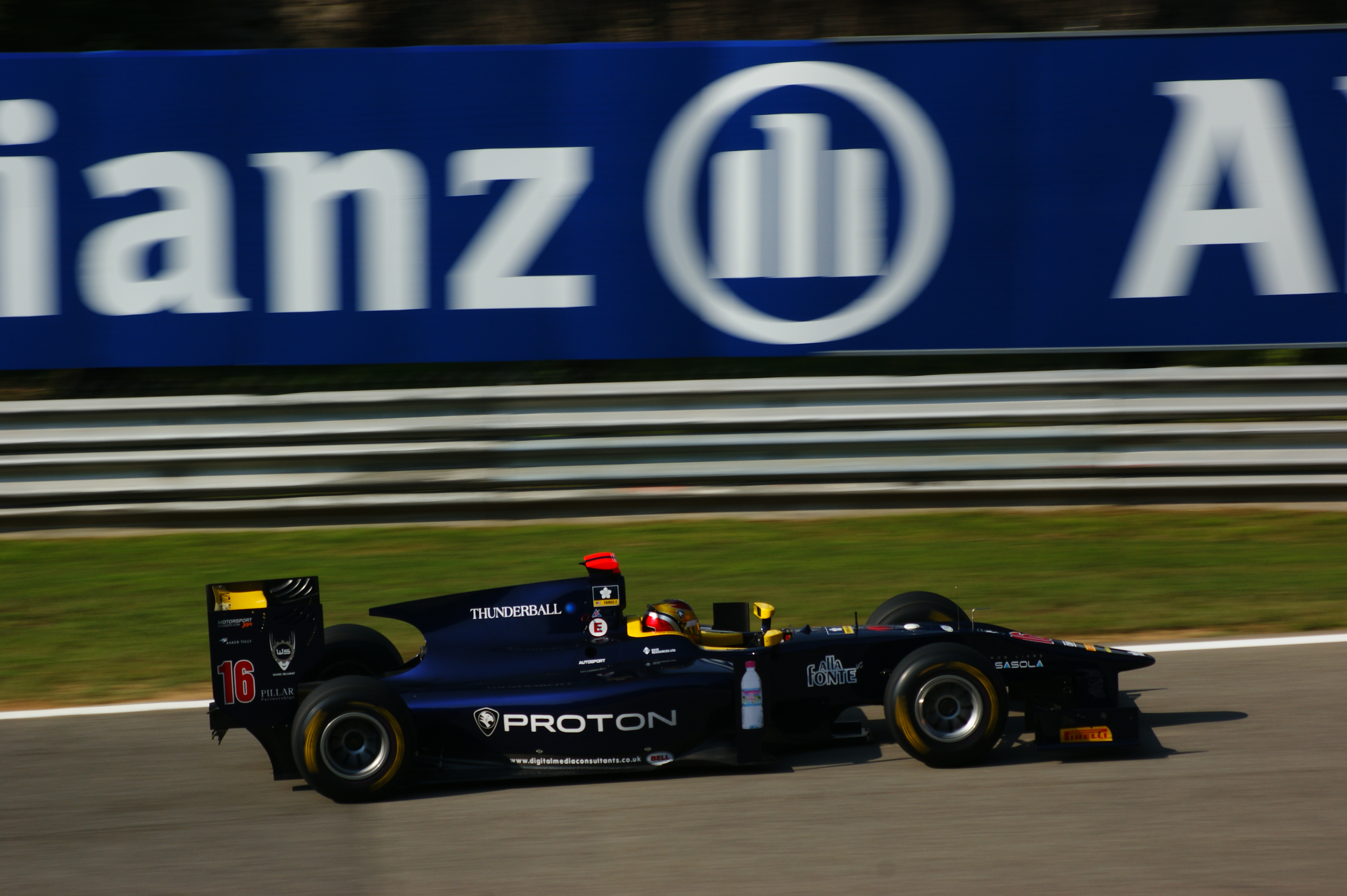
Fairuz driving for Super Nova at the Monza round of the 2011 GP2 Series season.

After stating his desire to return to full-time racing for 2011, Fairuz re-signed for Super Nova Racing to drive in the 2011 GP2 Series and 2011 GP2 Asia Series, alongside Luca Filippi and Johnny Cecotto Jr. respectively. After finishing fourteenth in the Asia series, he scored his first main series points in the first round of the championship. He finished 18th in the main series championship.

== Racing record ==
=== Career summary ===
Season	Series	Team	Races	Wins	Poles	F/Laps	Podiums	Points	Position
2000	British Formula Ford Championship	N/A	14	0	0	0	0	1	20th
2001	Formula Renault UK	Saxon International	13	0	0	0	1	134	7th
2002	British Formula 3 Championship – National Class	Fred Goddard Racing	25	0	0	1	4	119	9th
2003	British Formula 3 International Series	Promatecme UK /Team SYR	24	0	0	0	0	30.5	16th
2004	British Formula 3 International Series	Menu F3 Motorsport/P1 Racing	24	0	0	0	1	49	12th
2005	GP2 Series	DAMS	23	0	0	0	0	0	24th
2005–06	A1 Grand Prix	A1 Team Malaysia	4	0	0	0	0	8‡	5th‡
2006	GP2 Series	Super Nova Racing	21	0	0	0	0	0	25th
2007	Formula Renault 3.5 Series	Cram Competition	17	0	1	0	3	51	11th
2007	Formula One	Spyker F1	Test driver						
2007–08	A1 Grand Prix	A1 Team Malaysia	6	0	0	0	0	7‡	15th‡
2008	GP2 Asia Series	Super Nova Racing	10	1	0	1	3	24	4th
2008	Formula Renault 3.5 Series	Fortec Motorsport	13	0	0	0	1	17	18th
2008–09	A1 Grand Prix	A1 Team Malaysia	12	1	1	1	3	43‡	6th‡
2009	Formula Renault 3.5 Series	Mofaz Racing	17	1	1	1	5	98	**2nd**
2010	Formula One	Lotus Racing	Test driver						
2011	GP2 Asia Series	Super Nova Racing	4	0	0	0	0	1	14th
2011	GP2 Series	Super Nova Racing	18	0	0	0	0	5	18th
2011	Formula Renault 3.5 Series	Mofaz Racing	4	0	0	0	1	15	16th
2011	Formula One	Lotus Renault GP	Test driver						
2013	Super GT - GT300	apr	2	0	0	0	0	0	34th
2013	Porsche Carrera Cup Asia	Sime Darby Auto Performance	1	0	0	0	0	0	NC
2015	GT Asia Series - GT3	OD Racing	9	0	0	0	0	44	21st
2016–17	Asian Le Mans Series - GT	OD Racing Best Leader Team	3	0	0	0	0	5	18th
2017	Blancpain GT Series Asia - GT3	Arrows Racing	2	0	0	0	0	0	NC

‡ Team standings

=== Complete Formula Renault 2.0 UK Championship results ===
(key) (Races in bold indicate pole position) (Races in italics indicate fastest lap)

Year	Entrant	1	2	3	4	5	6	7	8	9	10	11	12	13	DC	Points
2001	Saxon International	BHI; 9	THR; 6	OUL; Ret	SIL; Ret	DON; 4	KNO; 11	SNE; 3	CRO; Ret	OUL; 10	SIL; 10	SIL; 10	DON; 13	BGP; 15	7th	134

=== Complete British Formula Three Championship results ===
(key) (Races in bold indicate pole position) (Races in italics indicate fastest lap)

Year	Entrant	Chassis	Engine	Class	1	2	3	4	5	6	7	8	9	10	11	12	13	14	15	16	17	18	19	20	21	22	23	24	25	26	27	DC	Points
2002	Fred Goddard Racing	Dallara F301	Renault Sodemo	Scholarship	BRH; 1; 24	BRH; 2 DNS	DON; 1; 19	DON; 2; 21	SIL; 1; 15	SIL; 2; 20	KNO; 1; 19	KNO; 2; 15	CRO; 1; 12	CRO; 2 C	SIL; 1; 15	SIL; 2; 25	CAS; 1; 16	CAS; 2; 23	BRH; 1; 28	BRH; 2; 16	ROC; 1 Ret	ROC; 2; 27	OUL; 1 Ret	OUL; 2; 14	SNE; 1 Ret	SNE; 2 Ret	SNE; 3; 17	THR; 1 Ret	THR; 2; 20	DON; 1; 22	DON; 2 Ret	9th	119
2003	Team SYR	Dallara F303	Opel Spiess	Championship	DON; 1; 7	DON; 2; 13	SNE; 1; 8	SNE; 2 Ret	CRO; 1; 10	CRO; 2 Ret	KNO; 1; 10	KNO; 2; 15	SIL; 1; 15	SIL; 2; 18	CAS; 1; 16	CAS; 2; 17																16th	30.5
2003	Promatecme UK	Dallara F303	Mugen-Honda	Championship													OUL; 1; 11	OUL; 2; 10	ROC; 1; 20	ROC; 2; 5	THR; 1; 4	THR; 2; 18	SPA; 1; 11	SPA; 2; 15	DON; 1; 11	DON; 2 Ret	BRH; 1; 17	BRH; 2; 13				16th	30.5
2004	Menu F3 Motorsport	Dallara F304	Opel	Championship	DON; 1; 7	DON; 2 Ret	SIL; 1; 11	SIL; 2 C	CRO; 1; 11	CRO; 2; 8	KNO; 1; 11	KNO; 2; 13	SNE; 1; 7	SNE; 2; 7	SNE; 3; 6	CAS; 1; 13	CAS; 2; 6	DON; 1 Ret	DON; 2; 12													12th	49
2004	P1 Motorsport	Dallara F304	Mugen-Honda	Championship																OUL; 1; 2	OUL; 2; 7	SIL; 1; 8	SIL; 2; 13	THR; 1; 11	THR; 2; 11	SPA; 1 DNS	SPA; 2; 21	BRH; 1 Ret	BRH; 2; 11			12th	49

=== Complete GP2 Series results ===
(key) (Races in bold indicate pole position) (Races in italics indicate fastest lap)

Year	Entrant	1	2	3	4	5	6	7	8	9	10	11	12	13	14	15	16	17	18	19	20	21	22	23	DC	Points
2005	DAMS	IMO; FEA; 17	IMO; SPR; 12	CAT; FEA; 12	CAT; SPR; 7	MON; FEA; Ret	NÜR; FEA; 14	NÜR; SPR; 10	MAG; FEA; 14	MAG; SPR; 10	SIL; FEA; Ret	SIL; SPR; Ret	HOC; FEA; Ret	HOC; SPR; 16	HUN; FEA; Ret	HUN; SPR; 13	IST; FEA; Ret	IST; SPR; 15	MNZ; FEA; 14	MNZ; SPR; 11	SPA; FEA; 13	SPA; SPR; 15	BHR; FEA; 11	BHR; SPR; 10	24th	0
2006	Super Nova International	VAL; FEA; 15	VAL; SPR; 10	IMO; FEA; Ret	IMO; SPR; 15	NÜR; FEA; 19	NÜR; SPR; 9	CAT; FEA; Ret	CAT; SPR; 14	MON; FEA; 10	SIL; FEA; 12	SIL; SPR; 7	MAG; FEA; Ret	MAG; SPR; 15	HOC; FEA; 22	HOC; SPR; 10	HUN; FEA; 16	HUN; SPR; Ret	IST; FEA; Ret	IST; SPR; Ret	MNZ; FEA; 14	MNZ; SPR; 10			24th	0
2011	Super Nova Racing	IST; FEA; 12	IST; SPR; 5	CAT; FEA; 14	CAT; SPR; 6	MON; FEA; 15	MON; SPR; 10	VAL; FEA; 16	VAL; SPR; 16	SIL; FEA; 21	SIL; SPR; 15	NÜR; FEA; 16	NÜR; SPR; 12	HUN; FEA; Ret	HUN; SPR; Ret	SPA; FEA; 7	SPA; SPR; 21	MNZ; FEA; 18	MNZ; SPR; Ret						18th	5

==== Complete GP2 Asia Series results ====
(key) (Races in bold indicate pole position) (Races in italics indicate fastest lap)

Year	Entrant	1	2	3	4	5	6	7	8	9	10	DC	Points
2008	Super Nova International	DUB1; FEA; 8	DUB1; SPR; 2	SEN; FEA; 8	SEN; SPR; 1	SEP; FEA; 2	SEP; SPR; 6	BHR; FEA; Ret	BHR; SPR; Ret	DUB2; FEA; 11	DUB2; SPR; 6	4th	24
2011	Super Nova Racing	YMC; FEA; Ret	YMC; SPR; 15	IMO; FEA; 8	IMO; SPR; Ret							14th	1

=== Complete A1 Grand Prix results ===
(key) (Races in bold indicate pole position) (Races in italics indicate fastest lap)

Year	Entrant	1	2	3	4	5	6	7	8	9	10	11	12	13	14	15	16	17	18	19	20	21	22	DC	Points	Ref
2005–06	Malaysia	GBR; SPR; 13	GBR; FEA	GER; SPR	GER; FEA	POR; SPR; 8	POR; FEA; Ret	AUS; SPR	AUS; FEA	MYS; SPR; 8	MYS; FEA	UAE; SPR	UAE; FEA	RSA; SPR	RSA; FEA	IDN; SPR	IDN; FEA	MEX; SPR	MEX; FEA	USA; SPR	USA; FEA	CHN; SPR	CHN; FEA	5th	74	
2007–08	Malaysia	NED; SPR	NED; FEA	CZE; SPR	CZE; FEA	MYS; SPR	MYS; FEA	ZHU; SPR	ZHU; FEA	NZL; SPR	NZL; FEA	AUS; SPR; 20	AUS; FEA; 17	RSA; SPR; 9	RSA; FEA; 5	MEX; SPR	MEX; FEA	SHA; SPR	SHA; FEA	GBR; SPR; 13	GBR; SPR; Ret			15th	25	
2008–09	Malaysia	NED; SPR; 1	**NED**; **FEA**; 2	CHN; SPR; 13	CHN; FEA; 5	MYS; SPR; 15	MYS; FEA; 10	NZL; SPR; 8	NZL; FEA; 10	RSA; SPR; 9	RSA; FEA; NC	POR; SPR; 8	POR; FEA; 3	GBR; SPR	GBR; SPR									6th	43	

=== Complete Formula Renault 3.5 Series results ===
(key) (Races in bold indicate pole position) (Races in italics indicate fastest lap)

Year	Team	1	2	3	4	5	6	7	8	9	10	11	12	13	14	15	16	17	Pos	Points
2007	Cram Competition	MNZ; 1; 12	MNZ; 2; 10	NÜR; 1 Ret	NÜR; 2; 22	MON; 1 Ret	HUN; 1; 2	HUN; 2 Ret	**SPA**; **1**; 2	SPA; 2 Ret	DON; 1 Ret	DON; 2; 10	MAG; 1 Ret	MAG; 2 Ret	EST; 1; 8	EST; 2; 3	CAT; 1; 12	CAT; 2; 8	11th	51
2008	Fortec Motorsport	MNZ; 1	MNZ; 2	SPA; 1	SPA; 2	MON; 1; 3	SIL; 1 Ret	SIL; 2; 15	HUN; 1; 12	HUN; 2; 14	NÜR; 1 DSQ	NÜR; 2 Ret	BUG; 1; 13	BUG; 2; 19	EST; 1; 12	EST; 2; 20	CAT; 1 Ret	CAT; 2; 6	18th	17
2009	Mofaz Fortec Motorsport	CAT; 1; 8	CAT; 2; 7	SPA; 1; 15	SPA; 2; 15	MON; 1; 15	**HUN**; **1**; 1	HUN; 2; 7	SIL; 1; 2	SIL; 2; 4	BUG; 1; 7	BUG; 2; 4	ALG; 1; 8	ALG; 2; 20	NÜR; 1; 2	NÜR; 2; 3	ARA; 1; 6	**ARA**; **2**; 2	**2nd**	**98**
2011	Mofaz Racing	ARA; 1	ARA; 2	SPA; 1	SPA; 2	MNZ; 1	MNZ; 2	MON; 1	NÜR; 1; 11	NÜR; 2; 3	HUN; 1; 13	HUN; 2; 16	SIL; 1 Ret	SIL; 2; 18	LEC; 1; 21	LEC; 2; 15	CAT; 1; 15	CAT; 2; 11	22nd	15

=== Complete Formula One results ===
(key) (Races in bold indicate pole position; races in italics indicate fastest lap)

Year	Entrant	Chassis	Engine	1	2	3	4	5	6	7	8	9	10	11	12	13	14	15	16	17	18	19	WDC	Points
2010	Lotus Racing	Lotus T127	Cosworth CA2010 2.4 V8	BHR	AUS	MAL; TD	CHN	ESP	MON	TUR	CAN	EUR	GBR; TD	GER; TD	HUN	BEL	ITA	SIN; TD	JPN	KOR	BRA	ABU; TD	–	–

=== Complete Super GT results ===
(key) (Races in bold indicate pole position) (Races in italics indicate fastest lap)

Year	Team	Car	Class	1	2	3	4	5	6	7	8	9	DC	Pts
2012	ThunderAsia Racing	Mosler MT900M	GT300	OKA	FUJ	SEP; Ret	SUG	SUZ	FUJ	AUT	MOT		NC	0
2013	apr	Audi R8 LMS ultra	GT300	OKA; 14	FUJ; 15	SEP	SUG	SUZ	FUJ	FUJ	AUT	MOT	NC	0
