= A1 Team Malaysia =

Malaysian team of A1 Grand Prix

- Malaysia
- Founded: 2005
- Seat holder(s): A1 Team (Malaysia) Sdn Bhd
- Team principal: Jack Cunningham
- Race driver(s): Fairuz Fauzy, Aaron Lim
- Car nickname: Unknown
- First race: 2005-06 Great Britain
- Rounds entered: 39
- Championships: 0
- Sprint race victories: 4
- Feature race victories: 1
- Pole positions: 3
- Fastest laps: 4
- Total points: 197
- 2008-09 position: 6th (43 pts)

A1 Team Malaysia was the Malaysian team of A1 Grand Prix, an international racing series.

== Management ==
A1 Team Malaysia was operated by A1 Team (Malaysia) Sdn. Bhd. The team was founded by Jack Cunningham, a Briton, and former Malaysian F1 driver Alex Yoong.

== History ==
=== 2008–09 season ===
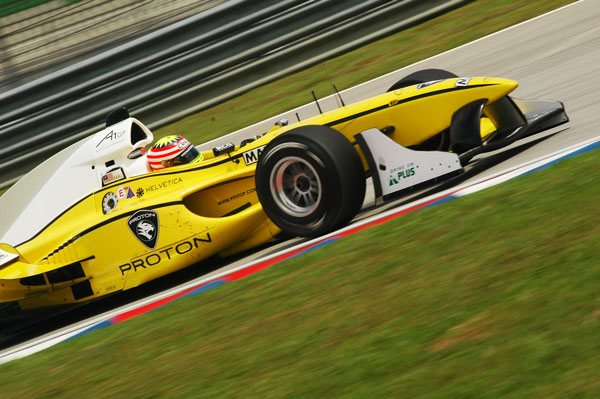
Alex Yoong

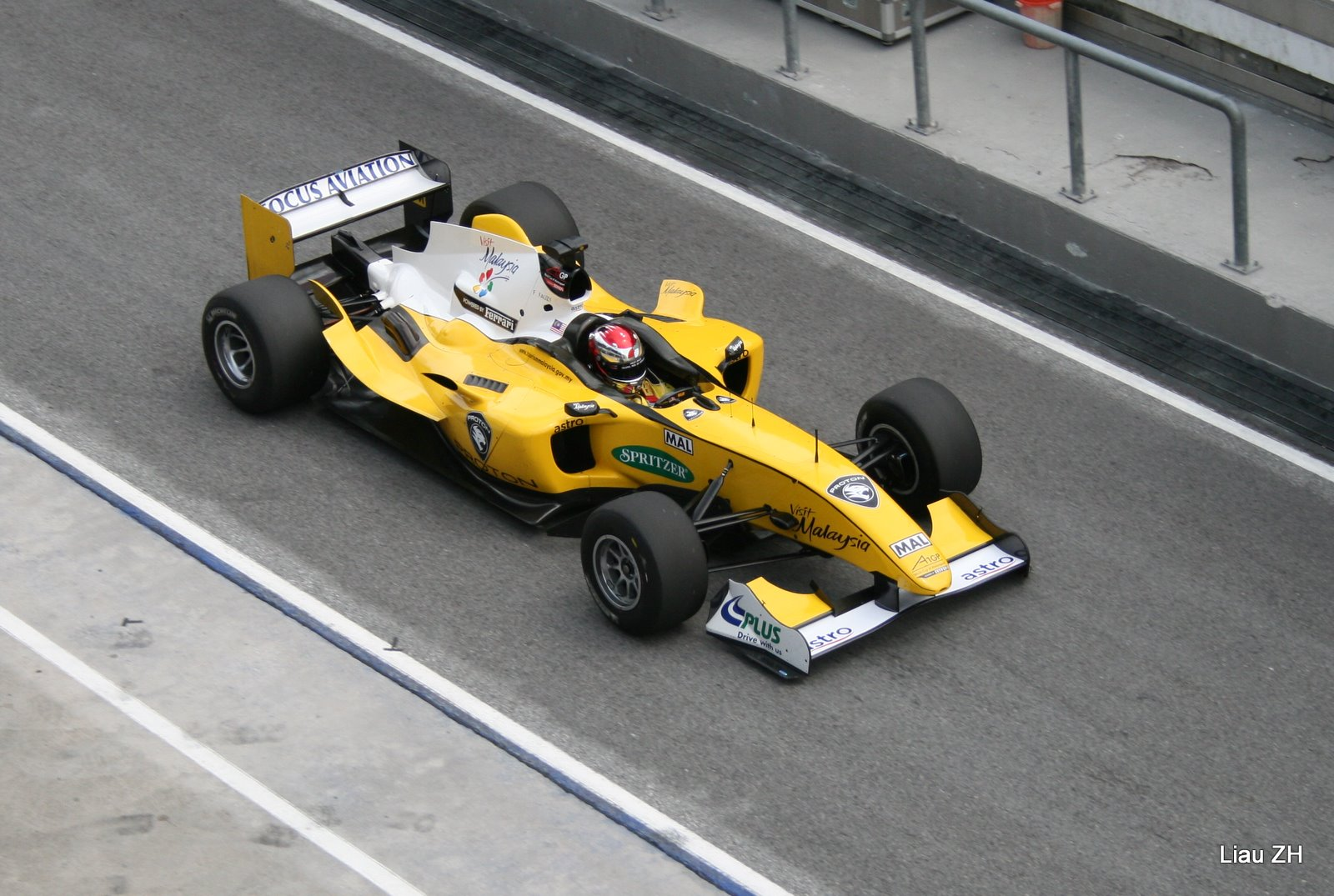
Fairuz Fauzy

Driver: Fairuz Fauzy, Aaron Lim

Fairuz Fauzy raced for A1 Team Malaysia in 6 of the 7 rounds of the 2008-09 season winning the Sprint race at Zandvoort while Aaron Lim participated in all the rookie sessions and raced at Brands Hatch. The team finished 6th overall that season.

=== 2007–08 season ===
Drivers: Fairuz Fauzy, Alex Yoong

In comparison to previous seasons, Team Malaysia struggled. They finished 15th in the championship.

=== 2006–07 season ===
Driver: Alex Yoong

Team Malaysia continued with their form from the previous season, taking three wins en route to 6th in the championship.

At the Czech Republic race, A1 Team Malaysia won the Sprint Race giving them pole position for the Feature Race. Driver Alex Yoong went on to win the Feature Race, gaining the fastest lap in the process, meaning A1 Team Malaysia came away with maximum points.

=== 2005–06 season ===
Drivers: Fairuz Fauzy, Alex Yoong

A1 Team Malaysia finished in 5th overall, with a win at Shanghai and 2 podium places.

== Drivers ==
Alex Yoong while racing for the team, accumulated an A1GP series-record of 45 consecutive starts.

Name	Seasons	Races (Starts)	A1GP Title	Wins	Sprint wins	Main wins	2nd	3rd	Poles	Fastest Laps	Points
Aaron Lim	2008-09	1 (2)									0
Fairuz Fauzy	2005-06, 2007-08, 2008-09	13 (22)		1	1				1	1	36
Alex Yoong	2005-06, 2006-07, 2007-08	28 (54)		4	3	1	2		2	2	140

== Complete A1 Grand Prix results ==
(key), "spr" indicate a Sprint Race, "fea" indicate a Main Race.

Year	Racing team	Chassis, Engine, Tyres	Drivers	1	2	3	4	5	6	7	8	9	10	11	12	13	14	15	16	17	18	19	20	21	22	Points	Rank
2005-06	A1 Team Malaysia	Lola, Zytek, Cooper Avon		GBR spr	GBR fea	GER spr	GER fea	PRT spr	PRT fea	AUS spr	AUS fea	MYS spr	MYS fea	ARE spr	ARE fea	ZAF spr	ZAF fea	IDN spr	IDN fea	MEX spr	MEX fea	USA spr	USA fea	CHN spr	CHN fea	74	5th
2005-06	A1 Team Malaysia	Lola, Zytek, Cooper Avon	Fairuz Fauzy	13				8	Ret			8														74	5th
2005-06	A1 Team Malaysia	Lola, Zytek, Cooper Avon	Alex Yoong		5	6	16			8	5		5	10	Ret	Ret	Ret	4	2	7	11	Ret	10	1	2	74	5th
2006-07	A1 Team Malaysia	Lola; Zytek; Cooper Avon		NED spr	NED fea	CZE spr	CZE fea	BEI spr	BEI fea	MYS spr	MYS fea	IDN spr	IDN fea	NZ spr	NZ fea	AUS spr	AUS fea	ZAF spr	ZAF fea	MEX spr	MEX fea	SHA spr	SHA fea	GBR spr	GBR fea	55	6th
2006-07	A1 Team Malaysia	Lola; Zytek; Cooper Avon	Alex Yoong	12	17	1	1	14	12	4	7	12	5	19	11	7	6	Ret	8	1	5	6	11	5	9	55	6th
2007-08	A1 Team Malaysia	Lola; Zytek; Cooper Avon		NED spr	NED fea	CZE spr	CZE fea	MYS spr	MYS fea	ZHU spr	ZHU fea	NZ spr	NZ fea	AUS spr	AUS fea	ZAF spr	ZAF fea	MEX spr	MEX fea	SHA spr	SHA fea	GBR spr	GBR fea			25	15th
2007-08	A1 Team Malaysia	Lola; Zytek; Cooper Avon	Alex Yoong	16	Ret	17	14	9	13	Ret	Ret	Ret	Ret					9	15	4	6					25	15th
2007-08	A1 Team Malaysia	Lola; Zytek; Cooper Avon	Fairuz Fauzy											20	17	9	5					13	Ret			25	15th
2008-09	A1 Team Malaysia	A1GP, Ferrari, Michelin		(Netherlands) NED		(China) CHN		(Malaysia) MYS		(New Zealand) NZL		(South Africa) RSA		(Portugal) POR		(United Kingdom) GBR										43	6th
2008-09	A1 Team Malaysia	A1GP, Ferrari, Michelin		spr	fea	spr	fea	spr	fea	spr	fea	spr	fea	spr	fea	spr	fea									43	6th
2008-09	A1 Team Malaysia	A1GP, Ferrari, Michelin	Fairuz Fauzy	1	2	13	5	15	10	8	10	9	15	8	3											43	6th
2008-09	A1 Team Malaysia	A1GP, Ferrari, Michelin	Aaron Lim													16	Ret									43	6th
