= 2002 Formula BMW ADAC season =

2002 Formula BMW ADAC

Seasons
- ← 2001 2003 →

The 2002 Formula BMW ADAC season was a multi-event motor racing championship for open wheel, formula racing cars held across Europe. The championship featured drivers competing in 1.2 litre Formula BMW single seat race cars. The 2002 season was the fifth Formula BMW ADAC season organized by BMW Motorsport and ADAC. The season began at Hockenheimring on 20 April and finished at the same place on 6 October, after twenty races. Nico Rosberg was crowned series champion.

== Driver lineup ==
Team	No.	Driver	Rounds
(Germany) Mamerow Racing Team	1	(Austria) Reinhard Kofler	All
(Germany) Mamerow Racing Team	2	(Germany) Christian Mamerow	All
(Germany) Mamerow Racing Team	3	(Republic of Ireland) Michael Devaney	All
(Germany) Mamerow Racing Team	4	(Germany) Christian Engelhart	All
(Germany) Mamerow Racing Team	5	(Germany) Niclas Königbauer	All
(Germany) VIVA Racing	6	(Finland) Nico Rosberg (Note: Rosberg is a German driver who raced this year under Finnish racing license.)	All
(Germany) VIVA Racing	7	(Denmark) Christian Bakkerud	All
(Germany) Mücke Motorsport	8	(Germany) Maximilian Götz	All
(Germany) Mücke Motorsport	9	(Germany) Thomas Holzer	All
(Germany) KUG/Dewalt Racing	10	(Italy) Giacomo Ricci	1–3
(Germany) KUG/Dewalt Racing	11	(Germany) Denis-Simon Knips	1, 3–10
(Germany) KUG/Dewalt Racing	42	(Netherlands) Junior Strous	8–10
(Germany) Josef Kaufmann Racing	12	(Austria) Hannes Neuhauser	All
(Germany) Eifelland Racing	15	(Germany) Christian Günther	All
(Germany) Eifelland Racing	16	(Germany) Andreas Wirth	All
(Germany) Eifelland Racing	20	(Germany) Maro Engel	All
(Germany) Bodensee-Racing	18	(Germany) Lance David Arnold	2–5, 7–10
(Germany) FS Motorsport	21	(Germany) Timo Lienemann	All
(Germany) FS Motorsport	22	(Germany) Franz Schmöller	All
(Germany) Reiter Engineering	23	(Germany) Quirin Müller	All
(Germany) Haubner Motorsport	24	(Germany) Sebastian Riedel	1–5, 7–10
(Germany) ADAC Sachsen	26	(Germany) Robert Kath	All
(Germany) Weigl Motorsport	27	(Germany) Dominik Weigl	All
(Germany) Weigl Motorsport	29	(Germany) Alexander Margaritis (Note: Margaritis is a Greek driver who raced this year under German racing license.)	4–5
(Germany) ADAC Nordbayern e. V.	28	(Germany) Matthias Luger	All
(Czech Republic) Igor Salaquarda Racing	30	(Czech Republic) Filip Salaquarda	1–8, 10
(Czech Republic) Igor Salaquarda Racing	31	(Czech Republic) Tomáš Kostka	1–6
(Czech Republic) Igor Salaquarda Racing	32	(Czech Republic) Marek Novotný	1–6
(Germany) Stefan Hubfeld	33	(Germany) Stefan Hubfeld	All
(Germany) CTS-Motorsport	34	(Germany) Philipp Wlazik	All
(Germany) springbock motorsport	35	(Italy) Claudio Torre	1–5, 7–10
(Germany) springbock motorsport	41	(Germany) Martin Hippe	9–10

== 2002 Schedule ==
The series supported the Deutsche Tourenwagen Masters at nine rounds, with additional round at the European Grand Prix on 22–23 June.

Round		Circuit	Date	Pole position	Fastest lap	Winning driver	Winning team
1	R1	(Germany) Hockenheimring	20 April	(Finland) Nico Rosberg	(Germany) Christian Mamerow	(Finland) Nico Rosberg	(Germany) VIVA Racing
1	R2	(Germany) Hockenheimring	21 April	(Finland) Nico Rosberg	(Germany) Andreas Wirth	(Finland) Nico Rosberg	(Germany) VIVA Racing
2	R1	(Belgium) Zolder	4 May	(Austria) Reinhard Kofler	(Austria) Reinhard Kofler	(Republic of Ireland) Michael Devaney	(Germany) Mamerow Racing Team
2	R2	(Belgium) Zolder	5 May	(Republic of Ireland) Michael Devaney	(Germany) Andreas Wirth	(Finland) Nico Rosberg	(Germany) VIVA Racing
3	R1	(Germany) Sachsenring	1 June	(Germany) Maximilian Götz	(Germany) Maximilian Götz	(Germany) Maximilian Götz	(Germany) Mücke Motorsport
3	R2	(Germany) Sachsenring	2 June	(Germany) Maximilian Götz	(Austria) Hannes Neuhauser	(Germany) Maximilian Götz	(Germany) Mücke Motorsport
4	R1	(Germany) Nürburgring	22 June	(Germany) Alexander Margaritis	(Republic of Ireland) Michael Devaney	(Austria) Hannes Neuhauser	(Germany) Josef Kaufmann Racing
4	R2	(Germany) Nürburgring	23 June	(Austria) Hannes Neuhauser	(Germany) Alexander Margaritis	(Finland) Nico Rosberg	(Germany) VIVA Racing
5	R1	(Germany) Norisring, Nuremberg	29 June	(Germany) Sebastian Riedel	(Germany) Franz Schmöller	(Germany) Alexander Margaritis	(Germany) Weigl Motorsport
5	R2	(Germany) Norisring, Nuremberg	30 June	(Germany) Alexander Margaritis	(Germany) Alexander Margaritis	(Germany) Alexander Margaritis	(Germany) Weigl Motorsport
6	R1	(Germany) EuroSpeedway Lausitz	13 July	(Austria) Reinhard Kofler	(Germany) Maximilian Götz	(Germany) Thomas Holzer	(Germany) Mücke Motorsport
6	R2	(Germany) EuroSpeedway Lausitz	14 July	(Germany) Thomas Holzer	(Austria) Reinhard Kofler	(Germany) Thomas Holzer	(Germany) Mücke Motorsport
7	R1	(Germany) Nürburgring	3 August	(Germany) Christian Mamerow	(Germany) Niclas Königbauer	(Austria) Reinhard Kofler	(Germany) Mamerow Racing Team
7	R2	(Germany) Nürburgring	4 August	(Austria) Reinhard Kofler	(Germany) Christian Mamerow	(Finland) Nico Rosberg	(Germany) VIVA Racing
8	R1	(Austria) A1-Ring, Spielberg	7 September	(Germany) Christian Mamerow	(Republic of Ireland) Michael Devaney	(Germany) Maro Engel	(Germany) Eifelland Racing
8	R2	(Austria) A1-Ring, Spielberg	8 September	(Germany) Maro Engel	(Germany) Maximilian Götz	(Germany) Maximilian Götz	(Germany) Mücke Motorsport
9	R1	(Netherlands) Circuit Park Zandvoort	28 September	(Austria) Hannes Neuhauser	(Germany) Christian Mamerow	(Finland) Nico Rosberg	(Germany) VIVA Racing
9	R2	(Netherlands) Circuit Park Zandvoort	29 September	(Finland) Nico Rosberg	(Germany) Timo Lienemann	(Finland) Nico Rosberg	(Germany) VIVA Racing
10	R1	(Germany) Hockenheimring	5 October	(Finland) Nico Rosberg	(Netherlands) Junior Strous	(Finland) Nico Rosberg	(Germany) VIVA Racing
10	R2	(Germany) Hockenheimring	6 October	(Finland) Nico Rosberg	(Finland) Nico Rosberg	(Finland) Nico Rosberg	(Germany) VIVA Racing

== Season standings ==
=== Drivers Standings ===
- Points are awarded as follows:

1	2	3	4	5	6	7	8	9	10
20	15	12	10	8	6	4	3	2	1

Pos	Driver	HOC1 (Germany)		ZOL (Belgium)		SAC (Germany)		NÜR1 (Germany)		NOR (Germany)		LAU (Germany)		NÜR2 (Germany)		A1R (Austria)		ZAN (Netherlands)		HOC2 (Germany)		Pts
1	(Finland) Nico Rosberg	**1**	**1**	2	1	11	11	3	1	4	2	7	5	3	1	5	17	1	**1**	**1**	**1**	264
2	(Germany) Maximilian Götz	3	11	12	8	**1**	**1**	Ret	9	3	3	2	2	14	8	3	1	2	10	2	6	183
3	(Austria) Hannes Neuhauser	Ret	Ret	4	4	5	15	1	**2**	Ret	Ret	6	3	7	5	4	4	**3**	7	6	4	145
4	(Germany) Christian Mamerow	4	2	5	13	3	3	2	3	Ret	9	Ret	10	**12**	3	**2**	11	4	2	18	11	139
5	(Republic of Ireland) Michael Devaney	Ret	6	1	**2**	6	4	6	Ret	5	5	3	4	2	13	7	13	Ret	12	4	7	134
6	(Germany) Thomas Holzer	2	Ret	7	5	Ret	10	8	22	2	4	1	**1**	5	7	13	7	7	4	8	10	130
7	(Austria) Reinhard Kofler	Ret	10	**6**	3	2	2	5	Ret	8	6	DNS	8	1	**2**	6	Ret	DSQ	Ret	Ret	14	110
8	(Germany) Maro Engel	16	Ret	DNS	15	13	Ret	11	12	6	Ret	12	7	4	4	1	3	Ret	DNS	3	2	89
9	(Germany) Andreas Wirth	13	9	13	6	7	Ret	7	5	Ret	DNS	9	9	Ret	14	8	2	6	3	7	Ret	68
10	(Italy) Claudio Torre	5	14	Ret	19	4	9	4	4	10	7			8	6	15	12	10	8	16	17	58
11	(Germany) Franz Schmöller	Ret	Ret	3	Ret	9	5	12	Ret	21	8	4	6	6	11	19	8	Ret	16	Ret	12	50
12	(Germany) Robert Kath	7	5	8	7	10	7	10	6	11	Ret	16	Ret	10	9	9	9	8	5	Ret	19	49
13	(Germany) Timo Lienemann	9	7	Ret	14	8	Ret	Ret	Ret	9	Ret	17	14	9	10	Ret	10	5	9	5	3	45
14	(Germany) Alexander Margaritis							**23**	7	1	**1**											44
15	(Denmark) Christian Bakkerud	6	3	11	12	14	6	9	8	13	17	5	DNS	19	15	Ret	18	17	Ret	14	16	37
16	(Netherlands) Junior Strous															10	5	12	6	9	5	25
17	(Germany) Sebastian Riedel	12	8	Ret	11	12	8	Ret	Ret	**7**	12			Ret	Ret	12	6	11	11	10	8	20
18	(Italy) Giacomo Ricci	8	4	9	Ret	16	13															15
19	(Germany) Niclas Königbauer	11	12	10	9	DNS	Ret	18	17	12	Ret	8	12	11	12	DSQ	DNS	13	17	DNS	26	6
20	(Germany) Philipp Wlazik	10	13	18	16	Ret	Ret	14	11	19	10	11	11	18	Ret	Ret	Ret	9	13	11	13	4
21	(Czech Republic) Filip Salaquarda	20	17	17	10	Ret	18	DNS	16	Ret	14	15	16	17	24	17	Ret			12	9	3
22	(Germany) Matthias Luger	18	Ret	14	17	15	16	13	10	16	20	20	19	15	22	Ret	16	16	14	17	20	1
23	(Germany) Dominik Weigl	23	Ret	19	18	20	17	25	Ret	Ret	DNS	10	18	Ret	17	Ret	Ret	14	23	21	24	1
24	(Germany) Christian Günther	Ret	20	Ret	23	22	20	19	15	17	11	18	17	21	18	11	Ret	15	19	15	21	0
25	(Czech Republic) Marek Novotný	15	15	16	DNS	17	12	17	14	15	19	21	23									0
26	(Germany) Lance David Arnold			Ret	21	19	19	21	13	14	13			13	16	16	15	DNS	Ret	19	Ret	0
27	(Germany) Christian Engelhart	17	19	Ret	20	21	Ret	16	23	Ret	16	13	13	23	19	Ret	20	DNS	21	23	23	0
28	(Germany) Martin Hippe																	Ret	18	13	15	0
29	(Germany) Quirin Müller	14	16	Ret	DNS	Ret	Ret	20	19	Ret	Ret	Ret	20	20	20	14	14	19	15	Ret	18	0
30	(Czech Republic) Tomáš Kostka	22	21	Ret	22	Ret	22	15	18	Ret	15	14	15									0
31	(Germany) Stefan Hupfeld	19	18	15	Ret	18	14	22	20	18	18	19	21	16	21	18	19	Ret	20	22	22	0
32	(Germany) Denis-Simon Knips	21	Ret			23	Ret	24	21	20	21	22	22	22	23	20	Ret	18	22	20	25	0
Pos	Driver	HOC1 (Germany)		ZOL (Belgium)		SAC (Germany)		NÜR1 (Germany)		NOR (Germany)		LAU (Germany)		NÜR2 (Germany)		A1R (Austria)		ZAN (Netherlands)		HOC2 (Germany)		Pts

Colour	Result
Gold	Winner
Silver	Second place
Bronze	Third place
Green	Points classification
Blue	Non-points classification
Blue	Non-classified finish (NC)
Purple	Retired, not classified (Ret)
Red	Did not qualify (DNQ)
Red	Did not pre-qualify (DNPQ)
Black	Disqualified (DSQ)
White	Did not start (DNS)
White	Withdrew (WD)
White	Race cancelled (C)
Blank	Did not practice (DNP)
Blank	Did not arrive (DNA)
Blank	Excluded (EX)

**Bold** – Pole
Italics – Fastest Lap
