= Tomáš Kostka =

Czech racing driver

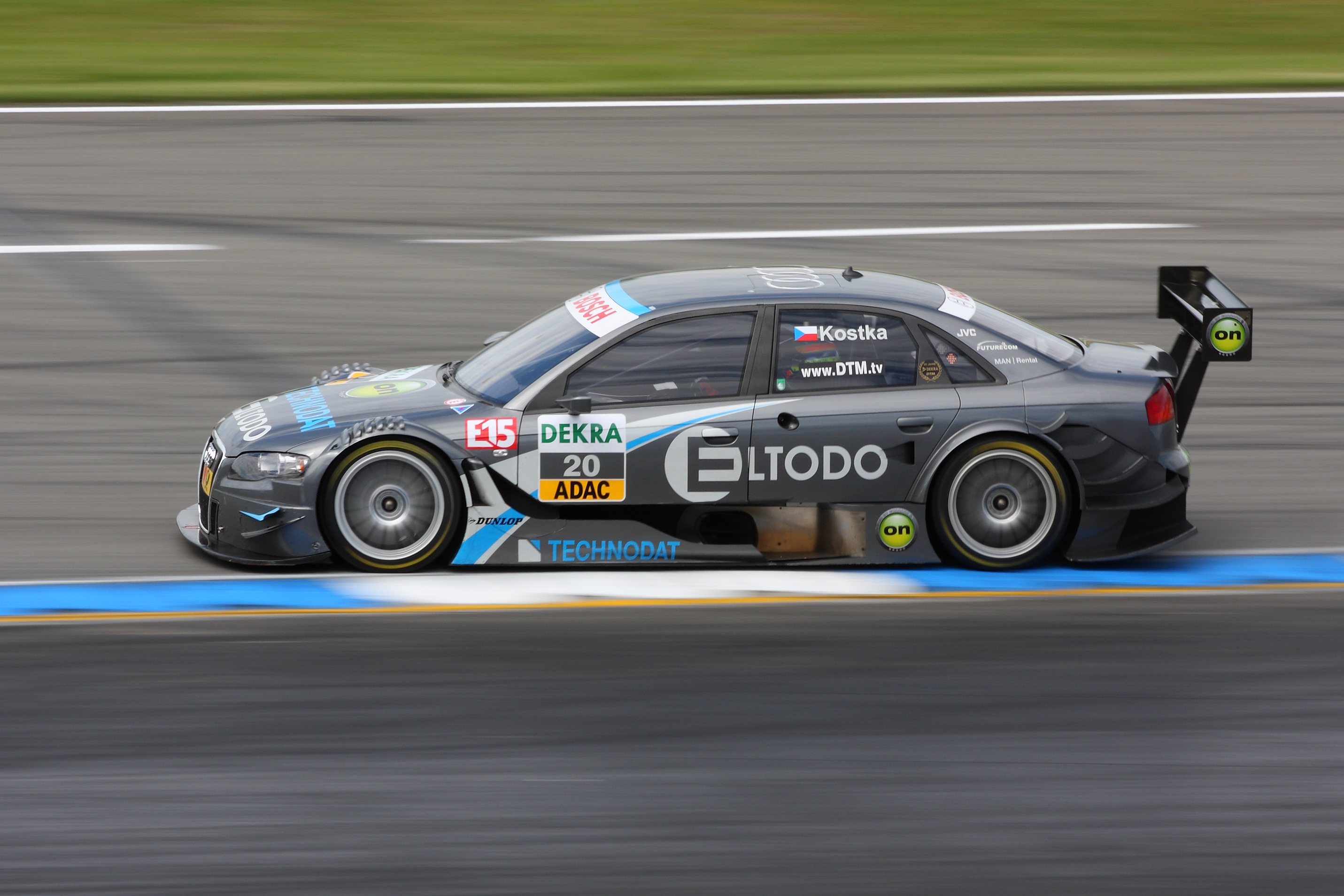
- Kostka competing at the opening round of the 2009 Deutsche Tourenwagen Masters season at Hockenheim
- Nationality: (Czech Republic) Czech
- Born: 27 August 1984 (age 42) Zlín, Czechoslovakia

EuroV8 Series career
- Debut season: 2014
- Current team: Audi Sport Italia
- Categorisation: FIA Gold (until 2016); FIA Silver (2017–)
- Starts: 10
- Wins: 3
- Poles: 4
- Fastest laps: 4
- Best finish: 2nd in 2014

Previous series
- 2009 2007–08 2005–06 2004 2003 2002 2001: Deutsche Tourenwagen Masters; Czech Touring Cars; Formula Renault 3.5 Series; World Series by Nissan; Recaro F3 Cup; Formula BMW ADAC; Formula Ford

Tomáš Kostka (born 27 August 1984) is a Czech former racing driver who competed in DTM in 2009.

== Racing career ==
Kostka raced in Formula Ford and the Ford Puma Cup in 2001. He raced in Formula BMW ADAC and Austrian F3 the following year. He moved onto the more competitive Recaro F3 Cup in 2003. He combined another year there in 2004 with races in the World Series by Nissan and Euro Formula 3000 championship. He carried on in Formula Renault 3.5 Series for another two seasons, amassing a total of 12 points. He moved into touring cars in the Czech series, racing an Audi A4 DTM, in which he won the 2008 Sprint championship.

Kostka raced for A1 Team Czech Republic at the first round of the 2006–07 A1 Grand Prix season at Circuit Park Zandvoort. He also competed in the 2007 24 Hours of Le Mans in a Ferrari 550-GTS Maranello for Convers MenX Racing, finishing 14th overall.

Kostka's performances in his national series were enough to be signed by Colin Kolles to drive a two-year-old Audi A4 for his DTM team for 2009.

== Racing record ==
=== Career summary ===
Season	Series	Team	Races	Wins	Poles	F.Laps	Podiums	Points	Position
2002	Formula BMW ADAC	Igor Salaquarda Racing	12	0	0	0	0	0	NC
2002	Austria Formula 3 Cup	KFR Team F3	2	0	0	0	0	0	19th
2003	German Formula Three Championship	KFR Team F3	16	0	0	0	1	64	8th
2004	German Formula Three Championship	KFR Team F3	2	0	2	0	2	36	12th
2004	World Series by Nissan	RC Motorsport	10	0	0	0	0	1	23rd
2004	Euro Formula 3000	John Village Automotive	1	0	0	0	0	0	NC
2005	Formula Renault 3.5 Series	Victory Engineering	12	0	0	0	0	6	23rd
2006	Formula Renault 3.5 Series	Draco Racing	11	0	0	0	0	5	30th
2006	F3000 International Masters	Charouz Racing System	2	1	1	1	1	11	16th
2006–07	A1 Grand Prix	A1 Team Czech Republic	2	0	0	0	0	27	12th
2007	24 Hours of Le Mans - GT1	Convers Menx Team	1	0	0	0	0	0	8th
2008	Czech International Championship - Division 4 > 2000	?	?	?	?	?	?	94	**2nd**
2009	Deutsche Tourenwagen Masters	Kolles Futurecom	10	0	0	0	0	0	NC
2011	FIA GT3 European Championship	Gravity Charouz Racing	4	0	0	0	0	0	NC
2012	Intercontinental Rally Challenge	Rufa Sport	1	0	0	0	1	15	25th
2014	EuroV8 Series	Audi Sport Italia	10	3	4	4	3	168	**2nd**

=== Complete Formula BMW ADAC results ===
(key) (Races in bold indicate pole position) (Races in italics indicate fastest lap)

Year	Entrant	1	2	3	4	5	6	7	8	9	10	11	12	13	14	15	16	17	18	19	20	DC	Points
2002	Igor Salaquarda Racing	HOC1; 1; 22	HOC1; 2; 21	ZOL; 1 Ret	ZOL; 2; 22	SAC; 1 Ret	SAC; 2; 22	NÜR1; 1; 15	NÜR1; 2; 18	NOR; 1 Ret	NOR; 2; 15	LAU; 1; 14	LAU; 2; 15	NÜR2; 1	NÜR2; 2	A1R; 1	A1R; 2	ZAN; 1	ZAN; 2	HOC2; 1	HOC2; 2	30th	0

=== ATS Formel 3 Cup results ===
(key) (Races in bold indicate pole position) (Races in italics indicate fastest lap)

Year	Entrant	Chassis	Engine	1	2	3	4	5	6	7	8	9	10	11	12	13	14	15	16	17	18	DC	Points
2003	KFR Team F3	Dallara F302	Opel	OSC1; 1; 9	OSC1; 2; 3	LAU1; 1; 9	LAU1; 2; 6	HOC; 1; 8	HOC; 2 Ret	NÜR; 1; 9	NÜR; 2; 8	LAU2; 1; 8	LAU2; 2; 5	A1R1; 1; 4	A1R1; 2 Ret	A1R2; 1 Ret	A1R2; 2; 7	OSC2; 1; 8	OSC2; 2; 6			8th	64
2004	KFR Team F3	Dallara F302	Opel	**HOC**; **1**; 2	**HOC**; **2**; 2	OSC1; 1	OSC1; 2	ASS; 1	ASS; 2	LAU1; 1	LAU1; 2	NÜR1; 1	NÜR1; 2	SAC; 1	SAC; 2	NÜR2; 1	NÜR2; 2	LAU2; 1	LAU2; 2	OSC2; 1	OSC2; 2	12th	36

=== Complete Euro Formula 3000 Series results ===
(key) (Races in bold indicate pole position) (Races in italics indicate fastest lap)

Year	Entrant	1	2	3	4	5	6	7	8	9	10	DC	Points
2004	John Village Automotive	BRN; 11	EST	JER	MNZ	SPA	DON	DIJ	ZOL	NÜR1	NÜR2	21st	0

=== Complete World Series by Nissan/Formula Renault 3.5 Series results ===
(key) (Races in bold indicate pole position) (Races in italics indicate fastest lap)

Year	Entrant	1	2	3	4	5	6	7	8	9	10	11	12	13	14	15	16	17	18	DC	Points
2004	Tata RC Motorsport	JAR; 1	JAR; 2	ZOL; 1	ZOL; 2	MAG; 1; 15	MAG; 2; 14	VAL; 1 Ret	VAL; 2; 10	LAU; 1 Ret	LAU; 2; 15	EST; 1; 12	EST; 2; 15	CAT; 1 Ret	CAT; 2 Ret	VAL; 1	VAL; 2	JER; 1	JER; 2	23rd	1
2005	Victory Engineering	ZOL; 1; 14	ZOL; 2 Ret	MON; 1; 18	VAL; 1 Ret	VAL; 2; 5	LMS; 1; 11	LMS; 2 DNS	BIL; 1 Ret	BIL; 2 DNS	OSC; 1; 12	OSC; 2 Ret	DON; 1; 22†	DON; 2; 13	EST; 1	EST; 2	MNZ; 1	MNZ; 2		23rd	6
2006	Draco Multiracing USA	ZOL; 1; 14	ZOL; 2; 14	MON; 1; 8	IST; 1 Ret	IST; 2; 15	MIS; 1; 20	MIS; 2 Ret	SPA; 1; 20†	SPA; 2; 9	NÜR; 1 Ret	NÜR; 2; 17	DON; 1	DON; 2	LMS; 1	LMS; 2	CAT; 1	CAT; 2		30th	5

^{†} Driver did not finish the race, but was classified as he completed more than 90% of the race distance.

=== Complete F3000 International Masters results ===
(key) (Races in bold indicate pole position) (Races in italics indicate fastest lap)

Year	Entrant	1	2	3	4	5	6	7	8	9	10	11	12	13	14	15	16	DC	Points
2006	Charouz Racing System	MNZ; 1	MNZ; 2	MAG; 1	MAG; 2	BRH; 1	BRH; 2	OSC; 1	OSC; 2	BRN; 1	BRN; 2	**IST**; **1**; 1	IST; 2; 8	EST; 1	EST; 2	EST; 3	EST; 4	16th	11

=== Complete A1 Grand Prix results ===
(key)

Year	Entrant	1	2	3	4	5	6	7	8	9	10	11	12	13	14	15	16	17	18	19	20	21	22	DC	Points
2006–07	Czech Republic	NED; SPR; 17	NED; FEA; Ret	CZE; SPR	CZE; FEA	CHN; SPR	CHN; FEA	MYS; SPR	MYS; FEA	IDN; SPR	IDN; FEA	NZL; SPR	NZL; FEA	AUS; SPR	AUS; FEA	RSA; SPR	RSA; FEA	MEX; SPR	MEX; FEA	CHN; SPR	CHN; FEA	GBR; SPR	GBR; FEA	12th	27

=== 24 Hours of Le Mans results ===
Year	Team	Co-Drivers	Car	Class	Laps	Pos.	Class Pos.
2007	(Czech Republic) Convers MenX Racing	(Russia) Alexey Vasilyev (Czech Republic) Robert Pergl	Ferrari 550-GTS Maranello	GT1	322	14th	8th

=== Complete DTM results ===
(key) (Races in bold indicate pole position) (Races in italics indicate fastest lap)

Year	Team	Car	1	2	3	4	5	6	7	8	9	10	Pos	Points
2009	Kolles Futurecom	Audi A4 DTM 2007	HOC; 11	LAU; 13	NOR; Ret	ZAN; Ret	OSC; 14	NÜR; 15	BRH; 14	CAT; 16	DIJ; 17	HOC; 11	17th	0

=== WRC results ===
Year	Entrant	Car	1	2	3	4	5	6	7	8	9	10	11	12	13	WDC	Points
2013	Tomáš Kostka	Škoda Fabia S2000	MON; Ret	SWE	MEX	POR	ARG	GRE	ITA	FIN	GER	AUS				NC	0
2013	Tomáš Kostka	Citroën DS3 WRC											FRA; Ret	ESP	GBR	NC	0

=== Complete EuroV8 Series results ===
(key) (Races in bold indicate pole position) (Races in italics indicate fastest lap)

Year	Team	Car	1	2	3	4	5	6	7	8	9	10	DC	Points
2014	Audi Sport Italia	Audi RS5	MNZ; R1; 4	MNZ; R2; 4	**VAL**; **R1**; 10	VAL; R2; 1	MUG; R1; 6	MUG; R2; 8	**BRN**; **R1**; 1	BRN; R2; Ret	**SAC**; **1**; 1	**HOC**; **1**; 4	**2nd**	**168**
