= 2003 Formula BMW ADAC season =

2003 Formula BMW ADAC

Seasons
- ← 2002 2004 →

The 2003 Formula BMW ADAC season was a multi-event motor racing championship for open wheel, formula racing cars held across Europe. The championship featured drivers competing in 1.2 litre Formula BMW single seat race cars. The 2003 season was the sixth Formula BMW ADAC season organized by BMW Motorsport and ADAC. The season began at Hockenheimring on 26 April and finished at the same place on 5 October, after twenty races.

Maximilian Götz was crowned series champion. Götz beat future Formula One World Champion Sebastian Vettel to the championship by 43 points, winning six races.

== Driver lineup ==
| Team | No. | Driver | Class | Rounds |
|---|---|---|---|---|
| (Germany) Team Rosberg | 1 | (Denmark) Christian Bakkerud | | All |
| (Germany) Team Rosberg | 2 | (Republic of Ireland) Michael Devaney | | All |
| (Germany) Team Rosberg | 3 | (Brazil) Átila Abreu | R | All |
| (Germany) Mücke Motorsport | 6 | (Germany) Timo Lienemann | | All |
| (Germany) Mücke Motorsport | 7 | (Finland) Aki Rask | | 1–4 |
| (Germany) Mücke Motorsport | 8 | (Germany) Maximilian Götz | | All |
| (Germany) Mücke Motorsport | 9 | (United Kingdom) Dominik Jackson | R | All |
| (Germany) Eifelland Racing | 10 | (Germany) Andreas Wirth | | All |
| (Germany) Eifelland Racing | 11 | (Germany) Sebastian Vettel | R | All |
| (Germany) KUG/Dewalt Racing | 14 | (Germany) René Rast | R | All |
| (Germany) KUG/Dewalt Racing | 15 | (Italy) Salvatore Gangarossa | R | All |
| (Germany) springbock motorsport | 16 | (Germany) Mario Josten | R | All |
| (Germany) springbock motorsport | 17 | (Israel) Erez Liven | R | 1–5 |
| (Germany) springbock motorsport | 18 | (Russia) Vladimir Labazov | | All |
| (Germany) springbock motorsport | 44 | (Germany) Sebastian Riedel | | 9–10 |
| (Czech Republic) I.S.R. | 19 | (Czech Republic) Erik Janiš | R | 2–3, 7–10 |
| (Czech Republic) I.S.R. | 20 | (Czech Republic) Filip Salaquarda | R | All |
| (Czech Republic) I.S.R. | 21 | (Czech Republic) Jan Charouz | | 1, 4–10 |
| (Germany) Josef Kaufmann Racing | 22 | (Austria) Christian Paar | R | All |
| (Germany) Josef Kaufmann Racing | 23 | (Austria) Christopher Wassermann | R | All |
| (Germany) MIS Motorsporttechnik | 24 | (Germany) Niclas Königbauer | | All |
| (Germany) MIS Motorsporttechnik | 25 | (Germany) Christian Engelhart | | 1, 3–4, 6 |
| (Germany) MIS Motorsporttechnik | 38 | (Germany) Dominik Weigl | | 5–6 |
| (Germany) ADAC Sachsen e. V. | 26 | (Germany) Robert Kath | | All |
| (Germany) ADAC Nordbayern e. V. | 27 | (Germany) Matthias Luger | | 7 |
| (Germany) Team Lauderbach Motorsport | 28 | (Italy) Davide Rigon | R | All |
| (Germany) FS Motorsport | 29 | (Germany) Andreas Ciecior | R | All |
| (Germany) FS Motorsport | | (Netherlands) Ton Strous Jr. | | 6 |
| (Switzerland) Natacha Gachnang | 30 | (Switzerland) Natacha Gachnang | R | All |
| (Germany) Martin Hippe | 31 | (Germany) Martin Hippe | | All |
| (Germany) ADAC Nordrhein e.V. | 32 | (Germany) Hanno Hess | | All |
| (Germany) Philipp Wlazik Motorsport | 33 | (Germany) Philipp Wlazik | | 4–8 |
| (Czech Republic) American Bull Racing | 34 | (Czech Republic) Michael Vorba | R | All |
| (Austria) HBR Motorsport | 35 | (Germany) Adrian Sutil | | All |
| (Austria) HBR Motorsport | 36 | (Republic of Ireland) Robby Coleman | | 1–9 |
| (Germany) Ostertag Racing | 40 | (Germany) Heinrich Ostertag | R | 1–6 |
| (Belgium) Sebastian Feltes | 42 | (Belgium) Sebastian Feltes | | 7, 9 |

| Icon | Class |
|---|---|
| R | Rookie Cup |

== 2003 Schedule ==
The series supported the Deutsche Tourenwagen Masters at nine rounds, with additional round at the European Grand Prix on 28–29 June.

| Round | | Circuit | Date | Pole position | Fastest lap | Winning driver | Winning team |
|---|---|---|---|---|---|---|---|
| 1 | R1 | (Germany) Hockenheimring | 26 April | (Germany) Robert Kath | (Germany) Robert Kath | (Germany) Robert Kath | (Germany) ADAC Sachsen e. V. |
| 1 | R2 | (Germany) Hockenheimring | 27 April | (Germany) Maximilian Götz | (Germany) Maximilian Götz | (Germany) Maximilian Götz | (Germany) Mücke Motorsport |
| 2 | R1 | (Italy) Adria International Raceway | 10 May | (Finland) Aki Rask | (Germany) Sebastian Vettel | (Germany) Sebastian Vettel | (Germany) Eifelland Racing |
| 2 | R2 | (Italy) Adria International Raceway | 11 May | (Germany) Sebastian Vettel | (Republic of Ireland) Michael Devaney | (Germany) Sebastian Vettel | (Germany) Eifelland Racing |
| 3 | R1 | (Germany) Nürburgring | 24 May | (Republic of Ireland) Robby Coleman | (Germany) Maximilian Götz | (Germany) Maximilian Götz | (Germany) Mücke Motorsport |
| 3 | R2 | (Germany) Nürburgring | 25 May | (Germany) Maximilian Götz | (Germany) Sebastian Vettel | (Germany) Maximilian Götz | (Germany) Mücke Motorsport |
| 4 | R1 | (Germany) EuroSpeedway Lausitz | 7 June | (Germany) Maximilian Götz | (Germany) Sebastian Vettel | (Germany) Maximilian Götz | (Germany) Mücke Motorsport |
| 4 | R2 | (Germany) EuroSpeedway Lausitz | 8 June | (Germany) Robert Kath | (Germany) Timo Lienemann | (Germany) Robert Kath | (Germany) ADAC Sachsen e. V. |
| 5 | R1 | (Germany) Norisring, Nuremberg | 21 June | (Republic of Ireland) Michael Devaney | (Republic of Ireland) Robby Coleman | (Republic of Ireland) Michael Devaney | (Germany) Team Rosberg |
| 5 | R2 | (Germany) Norisring, Nuremberg | 22 June | (Germany) Sebastian Vettel | (Germany) Maximilian Götz | (Germany) Sebastian Vettel | (Germany) Eifelland Racing |
| 6 | R1 | (Germany) Nürburgring | 28 June | (Germany) Sebastian Vettel | (Germany) Maximilian Götz | (United Kingdom) Dominik Jackson | (Germany) Mücke Motorsport |
| 6 | R2 | (Germany) Nürburgring | 29 June | (Germany) Sebastian Vettel | (Germany) Maximilian Götz | (Germany) Maximilian Götz | (Germany) Mücke Motorsport |
| 7 | R1 | (Germany) Nürburgring | 16 August | (Germany) Sebastian Vettel | (Germany) Sebastian Vettel | (Germany) Sebastian Vettel | (Germany) Eifelland Racing |
| 7 | R2 | (Germany) Nürburgring | 17 August | (Germany) Adrian Sutil | (Republic of Ireland) Michael Devaney | (Austria) Christopher Wassermann | (Germany) Josef Kaufmann Racing |
| 8 | R1 | (Austria) A1-Ring, Spielberg | 6 September | (Germany) Adrian Sutil | (Germany) Robert Kath | (Republic of Ireland) Michael Devaney | (Germany) Team Rosberg |
| 8 | R2 | (Austria) A1-Ring, Spielberg | 7 September | (Czech Republic) Michael Vorba | (Germany) Maximilian Götz | (Republic of Ireland) Michael Devaney | (Germany) Team Rosberg |
| 9 | R1 | (Netherlands) Circuit Park Zandvoort | 20 September | (Germany) Maximilian Götz | (Germany) Timo Lienemann | (Germany) Maximilian Götz | (Germany) Mücke Motorsport |
| 9 | R2 | (Netherlands) Circuit Park Zandvoort | 21 September | (Czech Republic) Michael Vorba | (Czech Republic) Michael Vorba | (Czech Republic) Michael Vorba | (Czech Republic) American Bull Racing |
| 10 | R1 | (Germany) Hockenheimring | 4 October | (United Kingdom) Dominik Jackson | (Germany) Adrian Sutil | (United Kingdom) Dominik Jackson | (Germany) Mücke Motorsport |
| 10 | R2 | (Germany) Hockenheimring | 5 October | (United Kingdom) Dominik Jackson | (Czech Republic) Jan Charouz | (Germany) Sebastian Vettel | (Germany) Eifelland Racing |

== Season standings ==
=== Drivers Standings ===
- Points are awarded as follows:

| 1 | 2 | 3 | 4 | 5 | 6 | 7 | 8 | 9 | 10 |
|---|---|---|---|---|---|---|---|---|---|
| 20 | 15 | 12 | 10 | 8 | 6 | 4 | 3 | 2 | 1 |

| Pos | Driver | HOC1 (Germany) | | ADR (Italy) | | NÜR1 (Germany) | | LAU (Germany) | | NOR (Germany) | | NÜR2 (Germany) | | NÜR3 (Germany) | | A1R (Austria) | | ZAN (Netherlands) | | HOC2 (Germany) | | Pts |
|---|---|---|---|---|---|---|---|---|---|---|---|---|---|---|---|---|---|---|---|---|---|---|
| 1 | (Germany) Maximilian Götz | 2 | **1** | 6 | 2 | 1 | **1** | **1** | 3 | 2 | 2 | 9 | 1 | 9 | 6 | 2 | 2 | **1** | 4 | 5 | 8 | 259 |
| 2 | (Germany) Sebastian Vettel | Ret | 2 | 1 | **1** | 3 | 2 | 6 | 7 | Ret | **1** | **10** | **2** | **1** | 2 | 6 | 8 | DNS | 3 | 3 | 1 | 216 |
| 3 | (Germany) Robert Kath | **1** | 3 | 8 | 3 | 8 | 6 | 2 | **1** | 7 | 9 | 15 | 3 | 7 | 10 | 12 | 14 | 3 | 2 | 24 | 4 | 151 |
| 4 | (Republic of Ireland) Michael Devaney | 6 | 9 | 7 | 21 | 2 | Ret | 4 | 10 | **1** | Ret | 3 | Ret | 6 | 14 | 1 | 1 | 6 | 5 | 4 | Ret | 140 |
| 5 | (Germany) Timo Lienemann | 4 | 13 | 15 | 7 | 4 | 9 | Ret | 2 | 3 | Ret | 7 | Ret | 2 | Ret | 19 | 13 | 2 | 6 | 8 | 2 | 111 |
| 6 | (Germany) Adrian Sutil | 7 | 6 | 4 | 6 | 6 | 7 | 22 | Ret | Ret | Ret | 6 | 8 | 3 | **3** | **Ret** | DSQ | 10 | 10 | 2 | Ret | 86 |
| 7 | (United Kingdom) Dominik Jackson | 10 | 11 | 22 | 11 | 15 | 17 | 11 | 22 | DSQ | DNS | 1 | 4 | 15 | 5 | 7 | 7 | 4 | 20 | **1** | **Ret** | 77 |
| 8 | (Czech Republic) Michael Vorba | 11 | 10 | 11 | 4 | 18 | Ret | 10 | 4 | 9 | Ret | 5 | Ret | 10 | 8 | 10 | **3** | 5 | **1** | 22 | DNS | 77 |
| 9 | (Brazil) Átila Abreu | 13 | 14 | 12 | 12 | 7 | 4 | 8 | 8 | 5 | 3 | 8 | DSQ | 11 | 11 | 3 | 6 | 8 | 8 | 6 | 7 | 77 |
| 10 | (Germany) Andreas Wirth | 19 | 4 | 3 | 16 | 5 | 8 | 5 | 9 | 20 | Ret | Ret | 12 | 16 | 13 | 5 | 4 | 21 | 7 | 11 | Ret | 68 |
| 11 | (Republic of Ireland) Robby Coleman | 25 | 15 | 10 | 8 | **11** | 3 | Ret | 16 | 4 | Ret | 2 | Ret | Ret | 7 | 4 | 5 | Ret | 13 | | | 63 |
| 12 | (Austria) Christopher Wassermann | 8 | 16 | 24 | 10 | 9 | 11 | 7 | 5 | 8 | 5 | Ret | Ret | 4 | 1 | 8 | Ret | 11 | 11 | 17 | 17 | 62 |
| 13 | (Czech Republic) Filip Salaquarda | 14 | Ret | 18 | Ret | Ret | 16 | 21 | Ret | 6 | 6 | 4 | 5 | 14 | Ret | 9 | 10 | 7 | 12 | 18 | 3 | 49 |
| 14 | (Finland) Aki Rask | 3 | 7 | **Ret** | Ret | 10 | 5 | 3 | 6 | | | | | | | | | | | | | 43 |
| 15 | (Austria) Christian Paar | 9 | 8 | 3 | 17 | 12 | 20 | Ret | 11 | 10 | Ret | 16 | 6 | 5 | Ret | Ret | 11 | 9 | Ret | 14 | 9 | 36 |
| 16 | (Germany) Niclas Königbauer | 5 | 17 | 21 | 5 | 13 | 10 | 12 | 15 | Ret | Ret | Ret | 7 | Ret | 16 | 14 | 15 | 14 | 21 | 12 | 11 | 21 |
| 17 | (Italy) Davide Rigon | 17 | 12 | 13 | 15 | 23 | 15 | 16 | 13 | 16 | 7 | Ret | 11 | 12 | 4 | 17 | 19 | 17 | 15 | 21 | 13 | 14 |
| 18 | (Germany) René Rast | 12 | 18 | 5 | 9 | 14 | 13 | 14 | 14 | Ret | Ret | Ret | 14 | 13 | 9 | 13 | 12 | 12 | 18 | 9 | Ret | 14 |
| 19 | (Switzerland) Natacha Gachnang | 21 | 20 | 19 | Ret | 20 | 25 | 17 | Ret | Ret | 4 | Ret | Ret | 8 | DSQ | Ret | 22 | Ret | 22 | 20 | 20 | 13 |
| 20 | (Czech Republic) Erik Janiš | | | 17 | 19 | 22 | Ret | | | | | | | 19 | Ret | 21 | 18 | 22 | 14 | 7 | 5 | 12 |
| 21 | (Germany) Mario Josten | 23 | DNS | Ret | 13 | 21 | 21 | 15 | 18 | 12 | 10 | Ret | 9 | 24 | 19 | 11 | 9 | DNS | 9 | 10 | 10 | 9 |
| 22 | (Germany) Christian Engelhart | 16 | 5 | | | Ret | 12 | 13 | 20 | | | Ret | 20 | | | | | | | | | 8 |
| 23 | (Germany) Martin Hippe | 15 | Ret | Ret | 14 | 19 | 19 | | | 13 | Ret | 18 | 19 | 21 | 12 | 20 | 20 | 13 | 19 | 15 | 6 | 6 |
| 24 | (Denmark) Christian Bakkerud | 26 | 19 | 16 | 18 | 16 | 18 | 9 | 12 | 11 | 8 | 11 | Ret | 17 | Ret | | | | | Ret | 15 | 5 |
| 25 | (Israel) Erez Liven | Ret | 21 | 9 | Ret | 24 | 23 | Ret | 19 | 14 | 12 | | | | | | | | | | | 2 |
| 26 | (Germany) Andreas Ciecior | 18 | Ret | 14 | 23 | 17 | 22 | Ret | 17 | Ret | Ret | DSQ | 10 | 20 | DNS | 18 | 17 | 16 | Ret | 19 | 14 | 1 |
| 27 | (Germany) Dominik Weigl | | | | | | | | | Ret | 11 | 17 | 15 | | | | | | | | | 0 |
| 28 | (Germany) Sebastian Riedel | | | | | | | | | | | | | | | | | 19 | 23 | Ret | 12 | 0 |
| 29 | (Netherlands) Junior Strous | | | | | | | | | | | 12 | Ret | | | | | | | | | 0 |
| 30 | (Czech Republic) Jan Charouz | 22 | 26 | | | | | 20 | 24 | 23 | Ret | 19 | 13 | 25 | 18 | 16 | 21 | Ret | 17 | 13 | 16 | 0 |
| 31 | (Russia) Vladimir Labazov | 20 | 22 | 20 | 22 | 25 | Ret | 18 | 23 | 15 | 13 | 14 | 16 | 22 | 17 | DNS | 16 | 15 | 16 | 16 | Ret | 0 |
| 32 | (Germany) Heinrich Ostertag | Ret | 24 | 25 | 20 | 26 | 24 | Ret | Ret | 19 | 14 | 13 | 18 | | | | | | | | | 0 |
| 33 | (Italy) Salvatore Gangarossa | 24 | 23 | Ret | 25 | Ret | DNS | 19 | 26 | 17 | 15 | 20 | Ret | 26 | 21 | Ret | 21 | 23 | 25 | Ret | 18 | 0 |
| 34 | (Germany) Philipp Wlazik | | | | | | | Ret | 21 | Ret | Ret | Ret | 17 | 18 | DNS | 15 | Ret | | | | | 0 |
| 35 | (Germany) Matthias Luger | | | | | | | | | | | | | Ret | 15 | | | | | | | 0 |
| 36 | (Germany) Hanno Hess | Ret | 25 | 23 | 24 | Ret | 26 | 24 | 25 | 18 | 16 | DSQ | Ret | 23 | 20 | 22 | 24 | 18 | 24 | 23 | 19 | 0 |
| 37 | (Belgium) Sebastian Feltes | | | | | | | | | | | | | 27 | 22 | | | 20 | 26 | | | 0 |
| Pos | Driver | HOC1 (Germany) | | ADR (Italy) | | NÜR1 (Germany) | | LAU (Germany) | | NOR (Germany) | | NÜR2 (Germany) | | NÜR3 (Germany) | | A1R (Austria) | | ZAN (Netherlands) | | HOC2 (Germany) | | Pts |

| Colour | Result |
|---|---|
| Gold | Winner |
| Silver | Second place |
| Bronze | Third place |
| Green | Points classification |
| Blue | Non-points classification |
| Blue | Non-classified finish (NC) |
| Purple | Retired, not classified (Ret) |
| Red | Did not qualify (DNQ) |
| Red | Did not pre-qualify (DNPQ) |
| Black | Disqualified (DSQ) |
| White | Did not start (DNS) |
| White | Withdrew (WD) |
| White | Race cancelled (C) |
| Blank | Did not practice (DNP) |
| Blank | Did not arrive (DNA) |
| Blank | Excluded (EX) |

**Bold** – Pole
Italics – Fastest Lap
