= 2007 Formula 3 Euro Series =

The 2007 Formula 3 Euro Series season was the fifth championship year of Europe’s premier Formula Three series. As in previous years, the championships took place over ten rounds – each with two races – held at a variety of European circuits. Each weekend consisted of one 60-minute practice session and one qualifying session, followed by one c.110 km race and one c.80 km race. The single qualifying session was retained from 2006, with the starting order for race 2 being determined by the finishing order of race 1, with the top eight positions reversed. This season was notable for the return of Volkswagen as an F3 engine supplier. The drivers' title was won by Romain Grosjean and the teams' title was again won by ASM Formule 3. It was the fourth double title win in succession for ASM. The top four drivers in the championship would go on to race in Formula 1: Sébastien Buemi, Kamui Kobayashi and champion Grosjean all debuted in F1 in 2009 and Nico Hülkenberg in 2010.

== Teams and drivers ==
2007 Entry List
Team	#	Driver	Rookie	Chassis (Note: All drivers competed in Dallara chassis (except Ultimate Motorsport drivers, who used Mygale chassis); model listed.)	Engine	Rounds
(France) ASM Formule 3	1	(Japan) Kamui Kobayashi		F305/012	Mercedes	All
(France) ASM Formule 3	2	(France) Romain Grosjean		F305/059	Mercedes	All
(France) ASM Formule 3	19	(Germany) Nico Hülkenberg		F305/021	Mercedes	All
(France) ASM Formule 3	20	(France) Tom Dillmann	R	F307/012	Mercedes	All
(United Kingdom) Manor Motorsport	3	(France) Franck Mailleux	R	F305/001	Mercedes	All
(United Kingdom) Manor Motorsport	4	(United Kingdom) James Jakes		F305/020	Mercedes	All
(United Kingdom) Manor Motorsport	21	(Switzerland) Cyndie Allemann		F306/035	Mercedes	All
(United Kingdom) Manor Motorsport	22	(Netherlands) Yelmer Buurman		F305/062	Mercedes	All
(Austria) HBR Motorsport	5	(Russia) Sergey Afanasyev	R	F305/045	Mercedes	All
(Austria) HBR Motorsport	6	(Czech Republic) Filip Salaquarda		F306/009	Mercedes	All
(Austria) HBR Motorsport	30	(Lebanon) Basil Shaaban		F306/026	Mercedes	All
(Germany) ASL Mücke Motorsport	7	(Switzerland) Sébastien Buemi		F305/011	Mercedes	All
(Germany) ASL Mücke Motorsport	8	(Italy) Edoardo Piscopo	R	F305/028	Mercedes	All
(France) Signature-Plus	9	(France) Jean-Karl Vernay	R	F306/010	Mercedes	All
(France) Signature-Plus	10	(France) Yann Clairay	R	F305/036	Mercedes	All
(France) Signature-Plus	23	(Spain) Dani Clos	R	F305/029	Mercedes	All
(France) Signature-Plus	24	(Italy) Edoardo Mortara	R	F305/035	Mercedes	All
(Switzerland) Jo Zeller Racing	12	(Germany) Tim Sandtler		F306/014	Mercedes	All
(Belgium) Bas Leinders Junior Racing Team	14	(Monaco) Michael Herck (Note: Herck is a Romanian driver who raced this year under Monegasque racing license.)		F306/028	Mercedes	1
(Italy) Prema Powerteam	16	(Netherlands) Renger van der Zande		F306/004	Mercedes	All
(Italy) Prema Powerteam	18	(Australia) Michael Patrizi	R	F306/005	Mercedes	All
(Austria) HS Technik	26	(Latvia) Harald Schlegelmilch		F306/025	Mercedes	All
(Austria) HS Technik	27	(United Kingdom) Euan Hankey	R	F305/039	Mercedes	All
(Germany) AM-Holzer Rennsport	28	(Germany) Marco Holzer	R	F305/060	Opel	1–6
(Germany) AM-Holzer Rennsport	28	(Germany) Marco Holzer	R	F305/060	Volkswagen	7–10
(Italy) R.C. Motorsport	31	(Germany) Maximilian Götz		F306/038	Volkswagen	7–10
(Italy) R.C. Motorsport	32	(United States) Jonathan Summerton		F306/028	Volkswagen	7–9
(Italy) R.C. Motorsport	32	(Netherlands) Carlo van Dam		F306/028	Volkswagen	10
(United Kingdom) Ultimate Motorsport	40	(Argentina) Esteban Guerrieri		M07/002	Mercedes	4
(United Kingdom) Ultimate Motorsport	41	(Republic of Ireland) Michael Devaney		M07/001	Mercedes	4

Icon	Legend
R	Rookie

=== Driver changes ===
Changed Teams

- Yelmer Buurman: Fortec Motorsport → Manor Motorsport
- Romain Grosjean: Signature-Plus → ASM Formule 3
- Esteban Guerrieri: Manor Motorsport → Ultimate Motorsport
- James Jakes: Hitech Racing → Manor Motorsport
- Filip Salaquarda: Team I.S.R. → Jo Zeller Racing
- Tim Sandtler: Signature-Plus → Jo Zeller Racing
- Jonathan Summerton: ASL Mücke Motorsport → R.C. Motorsport

Entering/Re-Entering Formula 3 Euro Series

- Sergey Afanasyev: Formula Renault 2.0 NEC & Formula Renault 2.0 Switzerland (Lukoil Racing) → HBR Motorsport
- Cyndie Allemann: German Formula Three Championship (SMS Seyffarth Motorsport) → Manor Motorsport
- Yann Clairay: Eurocup Formula Renault 2.0 (SG Formula) → Signature-Plus
- Dani Clos: Italian Formula Renault Championship (Pons Racing) & Eurocup Formula Renault 2.0 (Facondini Racing) → Signature-Plus
- Carlo van Dam: French Formula Renault Championship & Eurocup Formula Renault 2.0 (SG Formula) → RC Motorsport
- Michael Devaney: Porsche Carrera Cup Great Britain (Porsche Motorsport) → Ultimate Motorsport
- Tom Dillmann: French Formula Renault Championship & Eurocup Formula Renault 2.0 (SG Formula) → ASM Formule 3
- Maximilian Götz: Sabbatical → RC Motorsport
- Euan Hankey: Formula BMW UK (Fortec Motorsport) → HS Technik Motorsport
- Marco Holzer: Formula BMW ADAC (AM-Holzer Rennsport) → AM-Holzer Rennsport
- Nico Hülkenberg: German Formula Three Championship (Josef Kaufmann Racing) → ASM Formule 3
- Franck Mailleux: British Formula Renault Championship (Manor Motorsport) → Manor Motorsport
- Edoardo Mortara: Italian Formula Renault Championship & Eurocup Formula Renault 2.0 (Prema Powerteam) → Signature-Plus
- Michael Patrizi: Formula BMW UK (Motaworld Racing) → Prema Powerteam
- Edoardo Piscopo: Italian Formula Renault Championship & Eurocup Formula Renault 2.0 (Cram Competition) → ASL Mücke Motorsport
- Basil Shaaban: British Formula 3 National Class (Comtec F3) → HBR Motorsport
- Harald Schlegelmilch: German Formula Three Championship (HS Technik Motorsport) → HS Technik Motorsport
- Jean-Karl Vernay: French Formula Renault Championship & Eurocup Formula Renault 2.0 (SG Formula) → Signature-Plus
- Renger van der Zande: German Formula Three Championship (SMS Seyffarth Motorsport) → Prema Powerteam

Leaving Formula 3 Euro Series

- Richard Antinucci: HBR Motorsport → Indy Lights (Cheever Racing)
- Récardo Bruins Choi: Van Amersfoort Racing → German Formula Three Championship (Van Amersfoort Racing)
- Peter Elkmann: Jo Zeller Racing → Sabbatical
- Natacha Gachnang: Bordoli Motorsport & Jo Zeller Racing → Star Mazda Championship (AIM Autosport)
- Giedo van der Garde: ASM Formule 3 → Formula Renault 3.5 Series (Victory Engineering)
- Kohei Hirate: Manor Motorsport → GP2 Series (Trident Racing)
- Charlie Kimball: Signature-Plus → Formula Renault 3.5 Series (Victory Engineering)
- Julia Kuhn: Kuhn Motorsport → BFGoodrich Endurance Championship
- Ronayne O'Mahony: Prema Powerteam → FIA GT3 European Championship (Trackspeed Racing)
- Guillaume Moreau: Signature-Plus → Formula Renault 3.5 Series (KTR)
- Dominick Muermans: Van Amersfoort Racing → International Formula Master (Ombra Racing)
- Kazuki Nakajima: Manor Motorsport → GP2 Series (DAMS)
- Paolo Maria Nocera: Prema Powerteam → Italian Formula Three Championship (Lucidi Motors)
- Alejandro Núñez: Prema Powerteam → Formula Renault 3.5 Series (Red Devil Team Comtec)
- Paul di Resta: ASM Formule 3 → Deutsche Tourenwagen Masters (Persson Motorsport)
- Roberto Streit: Prema Powerteam → All-Japan Formula Three Championship (Inging Motorsport)
- João Urbano: Prema Powerteam → A1 Grand Prix (A1 Team Portugal)
- Sebastian Vettel: ASM Formule 3 → Formula Renault 3.5 Series (Carlin Motorsport)
- James Walker: Hitech Racing → Formula Renault 3.5 Series (Fortec Motorsport)

Leaving Trophy Class

- Julien Abelli: Janiec Racing Team → V de V Challenge Endurance Moderne — Proto
- Gina-Maria Adenauer: SMS Seyffarth Motorsport → Retirement
- Cemil Çipa: HBR Motorsport → Retirement
- Kevin Fank: SMS Seyffarth Motorsport → German Formula Three Championship (JMS Jenichen Motorsport)
- Bruno Fechner: SMS Seyffarth Motorsport → Sabbatical
- Anthony Janiec: Janiec Racing Team → Retirement
- Dominik Schraml: SMS Seyffarth Motorsport → International Formula Master (ADM Motorsport)
- Julian Theobald: SMS Seyffarth Motorsport → Formula Renault 3.5 Series (EuroInternational)

==== Additional participations ====
HS Technik expanded to a two-car entry from round 5 (Mugello) onwards. The second car was taken by Euan Hankey, making his Formula Three début. At the Nürburgring, Am-Holzer Rennsport replaced its Speiss-Opel engine with the new Volkswagen and RC Motorsport made a return to the championship with two Volkswagen-powered cars for Maximilian Götz and Jonathan Summerton. Though Götz finished in sixth place in the first race, neither he nor Summerton were eligible to score points. British F3 team Ultimate Motorsport made a one-off appearance in round 4 at Magny-Cours. Bas Leinders's Junior Team entered a single car for Michael Herck in the first round, but has not competed since then.

== Calendar ==
Round		Circuit	Date	Pole position	Fastest lap	Winning driver	Winning team	Winning rookie
1	R1	(Germany) Hockenheimring	21 April	(Switzerland) Sébastien Buemi	(Switzerland) Sébastien Buemi	(Switzerland) Sébastien Buemi	(Germany) ASL Mücke Motorsport	(France) Franck Mailleux
1	R2	(Germany) Hockenheimring	22 April		(Switzerland) Sébastien Buemi	(France) Romain Grosjean	(France) ASM Formule 3	(France) Jean Karl Vernay
2	R1	(United Kingdom) Brands Hatch	9 June	(United Kingdom) James Jakes	(France) Romain Grosjean	(France) Romain Grosjean	(France) ASM Formule 3	(Italy) Edoardo Mortara
2	R2	(United Kingdom) Brands Hatch	10 June		(France) Franck Mailleux	(Italy) Edoardo Mortara	(France) Signature-Plus	(Italy) Edoardo Mortara
3	R1	(Germany) Norisring	23 June	(Switzerland) Sébastien Buemi	(France) Romain Grosjean	(France) Romain Grosjean	(France) ASM Formule 3	(Italy) Edoardo Mortara
3	R2	(Germany) Norisring	24 June		(Germany) Nico Hülkenberg	(Germany) Nico Hülkenberg	(France) ASM Formule 3	(France) Tom Dillmann
4	R1	(France) Circuit de Nevers Magny-Cours	30 June	(Japan) Kamui Kobayashi	(France) Romain Grosjean	(Japan) Kamui Kobayashi	(France) ASM Formule 3	(France) Yann Clairay
4	R2	(France) Circuit de Nevers Magny-Cours	1 July		(Switzerland) Sébastien Buemi	(United Kingdom) James Jakes	(United Kingdom) Manor Motorsport	(France) Jean Karl Vernay
5	R1	(Italy) Mugello Circuit	14 July	(France) Romain Grosjean	(Germany) Nico Hülkenberg	(France) Romain Grosjean	(France) ASM Formule 3	(France) Jean Karl Vernay
5	R2	(Italy) Mugello Circuit	15 July		(France) Romain Grosjean	(France) Franck Mailleux	(United Kingdom) Manor Motorsport	(France) Franck Mailleux
6	R1	(Netherlands) Circuit Park Zandvoort	28 July	(France) Romain Grosjean	(France) Franck Mailleux	(France) Romain Grosjean	(France) ASM Formule 3	(France) Yann Clairay
6	R2	(Netherlands) Circuit Park Zandvoort	29 July		(France) Franck Mailleux	(Germany) Nico Hülkenberg	(France) ASM Formule 3	(France) Tom Dillmann
7	R1	(Germany) Nürburgring	1 September	(Germany) Nico Hülkenberg	(Germany) Nico Hülkenberg	(Germany) Nico Hülkenberg	(France) ASM Formule 3	(Italy) Edoardo Piscopo
7	R2	(Germany) Nürburgring	2 September		(France) Yann Clairay	(Latvia) Harald Schlegelmilch	(Austria) HS Technik	(Spain) Dani Clos
8	R1	(Spain) Circuit de Catalunya	22 September	(Germany) Nico Hülkenberg	(France) Romain Grosjean	(Italy) Edoardo Mortara	(France) Signature-Plus	(Italy) Edoardo Mortara
8	R2	(Spain) Circuit de Catalunya	23 September		(France) Franck Mailleux	(Netherlands) Renger van der Zande	(Italy) Prema Powerteam	(France) Tom Dillmann
9	R1	(France) Circuit Paul Armagnac	29 September	(France) Romain Grosjean	(France) Romain Grosjean	(France) Romain Grosjean	(France) ASM Formule 3	(Italy) Edoardo Mortara
9	R2	(France) Circuit Paul Armagnac	30 September		(Italy) Edoardo Mortara	(Switzerland) Sébastien Buemi	(Germany) ASL Mücke Motorsport	(France) Jean Karl Vernay
10	R1	(Germany) Hockenheimring	13 October	(France) Romain Grosjean	(France) Romain Grosjean	(Germany) Nico Hülkenberg	(France) ASM Formule 3	(Italy) Edoardo Mortara
10	R2	(Germany) Hockenheimring	14 October		(Switzerland) Sébastien Buemi	(Switzerland) Sébastien Buemi	(Germany) ASL Mücke Motorsport	(Italy) Edoardo Mortara

== Season standings ==
=== Drivers Standings ===
- Points are awarded as follows:

	1	2	3	4	5	6	7	8	PP
Race 1	10	8	6	5	4	3	2	1	**1**
Race 2	6	5	4	3	2	1	0		0

Pos	Driver	HOC1 (Germany)		BRH (United Kingdom)		NOR (Germany)		MAG (France)		MUG (Italy)		ZAN (Netherlands)		NÜR (Germany)		CAT (Spain)		NOG (France)		HOC2 (Germany)		Pts
1	(France) Romain Grosjean	5	1	1	Ret	1	Ret	2	7	**1**	2	**1**	3	5	2	8	DSQ	**1**	5	**2**	3	106
2	(Switzerland) Sébastien Buemi	**1**	3	7	2	**2**	2	3	19	3	5	3	2	2	3	Ret	6	4	1	5	1	95
3	(Germany) Nico Hülkenberg	2	7	4	6	Ret	1	Ret	14	21	14	6	1	**1**	4	**2**	8	3	3	1	7	72
4	(Japan) Kamui Kobayashi	10	10	3	3	8	Ret	**1**	9	2	4	2	17	11	Ret	19	Ret	2	2	4	Ret	59
5	(United Kingdom) James Jakes	11	5	**2**	8	6	5	6	1	4	Ret	8	6	4	7	4	7	18	Ret	21†	Ret	42
6	(Netherlands) Yelmer Buurman	8	2	6	4	7	4	7	3	15	6	7	16	15	6	Ret	11	5	7	3	4	40
7	(France) Franck Mailleux	3	6	Ret	Ret	14	8	5	4	6	1	5	11	10	20	5	3	7	18	11	6	38
8	(Italy) Edoardo Mortara	6	8	8	1	3	Ret	16	12	9	18	14	9	22	11	1	Ret	6	8	6	2	37
9	(France) Tom Dillmann	DNS	DNS	10	9	4	3	9	Ret	Ret	8	18	4	13	Ret	3	2	24†	19	17	14	23
10	(France) Jean Karl Vernay	7	4	16	12	5	Ret	8	2	5	Ret	20†	7	12	10	Ret	Ret	8	4	10	Ret	23
11	(Netherlands) Renger van der Zande	4	21	13	19†	15†	Ret	12	8	8	3	9	5	19	8	6	1	16	14	Ret	11	21
12	(France) Yann Clairay	Ret	16	9	7	12†	11	4	11	12	7	4	19	Ret	21	9	14	9	6	7	8	13
13	(Spain) Dani Clos	9	9	11	20†	Ret	10	11	10	7	11	Ret	Ret	7	5	12	4	12	10	8	5	13
14	(Latvia) Harald Schlegelmilch	12	11	12	11	10	9	14	13	16	13	21†	8	8	1	8	9	10	11	18	9	9
15	(Italy) Edoardo Piscopo	21	15	15	10	Ret	Ret	13	Ret	14	9	Ret	15	3	Ret	7	Ret	17	23	12	12	8
16	(Germany) Tim Sandtler	13	13	5	5	9	Ret	10	6	Ret	10	16	13	Ret	13	10	Ret	15	13	9	10	8
17	(Czech Republic) Filip Salaquarda	20	12	14	17	DSQ	DSQ	17	15	13	Ret	10	10	9	18	11	5	13	15	20	18	3
18	(Australia) Michael Patrizi	16	14	17	13	11†	6	22	18	11	Ret	11	21†	16	22†	17	Ret	Ret	17	Ret	13	1
19	(Germany) Marco Holzer	18	17	18	14	Ret	7	19	17	20	17	15	12	20	14	14	Ret	21	21	14	15	0
20	(Switzerland) Cyndie Allemann	15	18	Ret	15	Ret	Ret	Ret	Ret	10	15	12	14	17	19	15	Ret	20	16	19	Ret	0
21	(Russia) Sergey Afanasyev	17	20	Ret	16	DSQ	Ret	20	Ret	17	12	13	Ret	14	12	18	12	19	20	DNS	DNS	0
22	(Lebanon) Basil Shaaban	19	19	19	18	13	12	21	Ret	18	Ret	19	20	21	17	Ret	Ret	23	22	15	17†	0
23	(United Kingdom) Euan Hankey									19	16	17	18	Ret	16	Ret	13	22	Ret			0
24	(Monaco) Michael Herck	14	Ret																			0
guest drivers ineligible for championship points
	(Argentina) Esteban Guerrieri							15	5													0
	(Germany) Maximilian Götz													6	9	20†	10	11	9	16	Ret	0
	(United States) Jonathan Summerton													18	15	16	Ret	14	12			0
	(Netherlands) Carlo van Dam																			13	16†	0
	(Republic of Ireland) Michael Devaney							18	16													0
Pos	Driver	HOC1 (Germany)		BRH (United Kingdom)		NOR (Germany)		MAG (France)		MUG (Italy)		ZAN (Netherlands)		NÜR (Germany)		CAT (Spain)		NOG (France)		HOC2 (Germany)		Pts

Colour	Result
Gold	Winner
Silver	Second place
Bronze	Third place
Green	Points classification
Blue	Non-points classification
Blue	Non-classified finish (NC)
Purple	Retired, not classified (Ret)
Red	Did not qualify (DNQ)
Red	Did not pre-qualify (DNPQ)
Black	Disqualified (DSQ)
White	Did not start (DNS)
White	Withdrew (WD)
White	Race cancelled (C)
Blank	Did not practice (DNP)
Blank	Did not arrive (DNA)
Blank	Excluded (EX)

**Bold** – Pole
Italics – Fastest Lap

† — Drivers did not finish the race, but were classified as they completed over 90% of the race distance.

=== Rookie Cup ===
Rookie drivers are only eligible for the Rookie Cup title if they have not previously competed in a national or international Formula 3 championship.

Pos	Driver	HOC1 (Germany)		BRH (United Kingdom)		NOR (Germany)		MAG (France)		MUG (Italy)		ZAN (Netherlands)		NÜR (Germany)		CAT (Spain)		NOG (France)		HOC2 (Germany)		Pts
1	(Italy) Edoardo Mortara	6	8	8	1	3	Ret	16	12	9	18	14	9	22	11	1	Ret	6	8	6	2	99
2	(France) Franck Mailleux	3	6	Ret	Ret	14	8	5	4	6	1	5	11	10	20	5	3	7	18	11	6	93
3	(France) Jean Karl Vernay	7	4	16	12	5	Ret	8	2	5	Ret	Ret	7	12	10	Ret	Ret	8	4	10	Ret	77
4	(France) Yann Clairay	Ret	16	9	7	12	11	4	11	12	7	4	19	Ret	21	9	14	9	6	7	8	75
5	(Spain) Dani Clos	9	9	11	Ret	Ret	10	11	10	7	11	Ret	Ret	7	5	12	4	12	10	8	5	70
6	(France) Tom Dillmann	DNS	DNS	10	9	4	3	9	Ret	Ret	8	18	4	13	Ret	3	2	Ret	19	17	14	59
7	(Italy) Edoardo Piscopo	21	15	15	10	Ret	Ret	13	Ret	14	9	Ret	15	3	Ret	7	Ret	17	23	12	12	41
8	(Australia) Michael Patrizi	16	14	17	13	11	6	22	18	11	Ret	11	Ret	16	22	17	Ret	Ret	17	Ret	13	35
9	(Germany) Marco Holzer	18	17	18	14	Ret	7	19	17	20	17	15	12	20	14	14	Ret	21	21	14	15	22
10	(Russia) Sergey Afanasyev	17	20	Ret	16	DSQ	Ret	20	Ret	17	12	13	Ret	14	12	18	12	19	20	DNS	DNS	21
11	(United Kingdom) Euan Hankey									19	16	17	18	Ret	16	Ret	13	22	Ret			5
Pos	Driver	HOC1 (Germany)		BRH (United Kingdom)		NOR (Germany)		MAG (France)		MUG (Italy)		ZAN (Netherlands)		NÜR (Germany)		CAT (Spain)		NOG (France)		HOC2 (Germany)		Pts

=== Team Standings ===
	Team	Points
1	(France) ASM Formule 3	229
2	(United Kingdom) Manor Motorsport	119
3	(Germany) ASL Mücke Motorsport	104
4	(France) Signature-Plus	94
5	(Italy) Prema Powerteam	26
6	(Switzerland) Jo Zeller Racing	14
7	(Austria) HS Technik	10
8	(Austria) HBR Motorsport	4

=== Nations Cup ===
	Nation	Points
1	France	176
2	Switzerland	93
3	Germany	83
4	Netherlands	69
5	Japan	59
6	Italy	46
7	Great Britain	44
8	Spain	16
9	Latvia	10
10	Czech Republic	3
11	Australia	1
