= Filip Salaquarda =

Czech racing driver (born 1984)

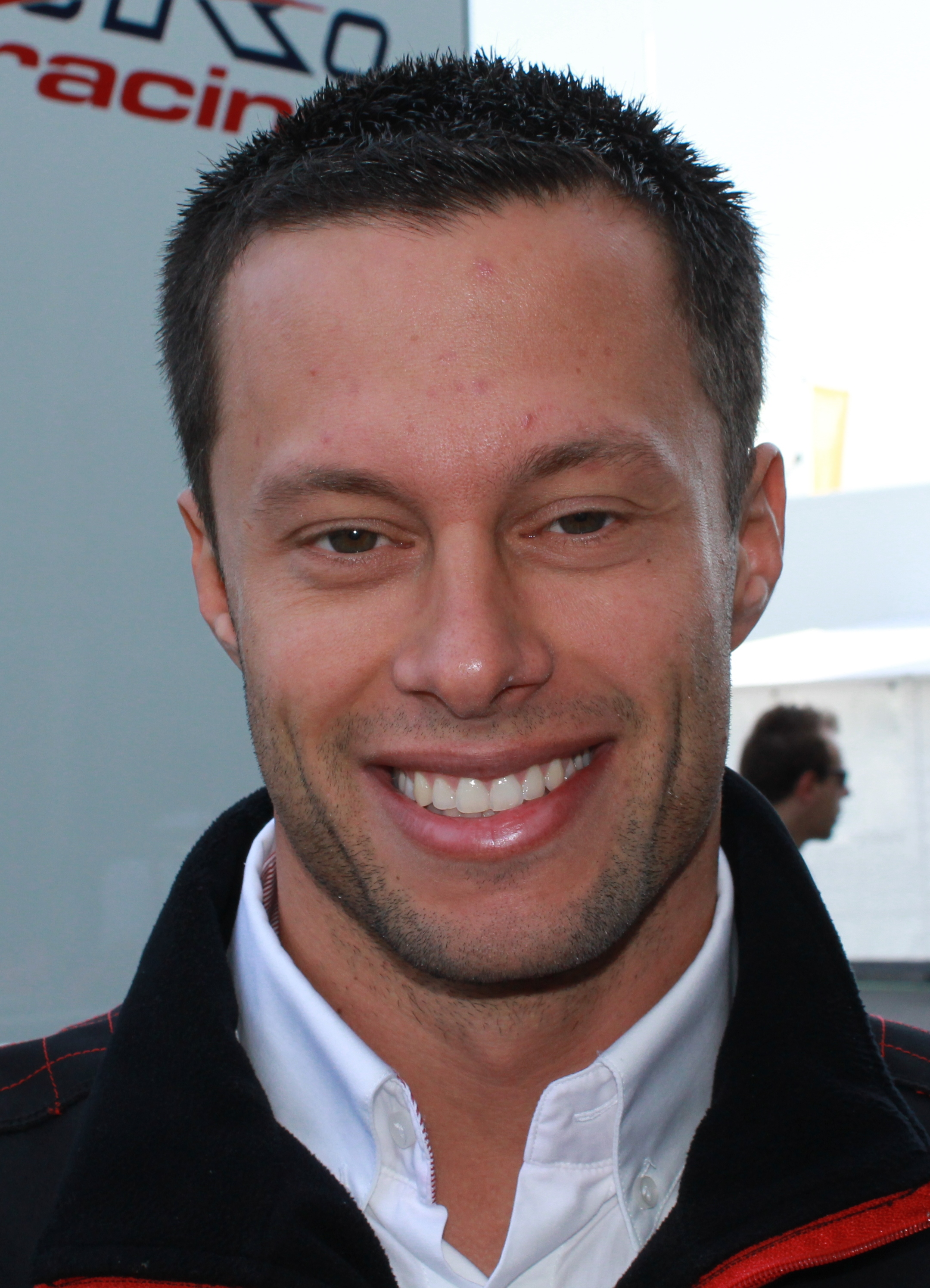
- Salaquarda in 2012.
- Nationality: (Czech Republic) Czech
- Born: January 11, 1984 (age 42) Prague (Czech Republic)

Formula Renault 3.5 Series career
- Debut season: 2009
- Current team: ISR Racing
- Categorisation: FIA Silver
- Car number: 26
- Former teams: Prema Powerteam; RC Motorsport
- Starts: 27
- Wins: 0
- Poles: 2
- Fastest laps: 0
- Best finish: 11th in 2010

Previous series
- 2011 2009 2007–08 2006–07, 2007–08 2005–07 2004 2002–03 2001 2000: Blancpain Endurance Series; Le Mans Series; Int. Formula Master; A1 Grand Prix; Formula 3 Euro Series; German Formula Three; Formula BMW ADAC; Škoda Octavia Cup; Ford Puma Cup

Filip Salaquarda (born January 11, 1984, in Prague) is a professional racing driver from the Czech Republic.

== Career ==
=== Early career ===
After an early career in karting, Salaquarda began his racing career in 2000 in his native Czech Republic, competing in the Ford Puma Cup where he finished in third place. A year later he stepped up to the Škoda Octavia Cup, finishing the year 13th in the standings.

In 2002, Salaquarda made his single–seater debut in the Formula BMW ADAC series in Germany. In his first season in the category, he was classified in 21st place. The following year, he improved to 13th overall, taking a podium place in the final round at Hockenheim.

=== Formula Three ===
In 2004, Salaquarda graduated to Formula Three, racing in the German championship with the family ISR Racing team. He finished the season in 11th place with 42 points. 2005 saw him move up to the Formula 3 Euro Series, the first of three seasons in the category. He failed to score a point in his first two seasons, whilst in 2007 a switch to HBR Motorsport saw him score three points.

In 2005, Salaquarda contested the famous end–of–season Macau Grand Prix whilst in 2006 and 2007 he also took part in the Masters of Formula 3 non–championship races.

=== F3000 International Masters ===
In June 2006, Salaquarda made an appearance at the Oschersleben round of the F3000 International Masters season. Driving for the Charouz Racing System team, he finished both races in second place. Despite only taking part in those two races, he scored enough points to finish 12th in the standings.

=== A1 Grand Prix ===
In April 2007, Salaquarda made his A1 Grand Prix debut for A1 Team Czech Republic in Shanghai, taking over the seat from Jaroslav Janiš. After finishing 17th in the sprint race he took the final points–paying position in the main event by finishing tenth. The following season, Salaquarda took part in the final six races of the campaign, taking a best race result of 11th place, also in Shanghai.

=== International Formula Master ===
Towards the end of 2007, Salaquarda took part in the final round of the International Formula Master season at Monza with ISR Racing. The following year he took part in a full season in the series, taking a best result of sixth in the opening race of the year at Valencia to finish in 24th position.

=== Le Mans Series ===
In May 2009, Salaquarda made a one–off appearance in the Le Mans Series, taking part in the Spa–Francorchamps 1000km event. He was entered in the GT1 class for IPB Spartak Racing, racing alongside Peter Kox and countryman Erik Janiš. They finished the race second in class, behind the winning Luc Alphand Aventures Chevrolet Corvette C6.R, and 15th overall.

=== Formula Renault 3.5 Series ===
Later the same month, Salaquarda made his debut in the Formula Renault 3.5 Series, joining the RC Motorsport team at the third round of the season in Monaco. After the race, in which he finished 21st, he left the team to join Prema Powerteam, who he remained with for the rest of the season. His best race result came in the sprint event at Portimão, where he finished in tenth place. He finished the season in 27th place overall.

Salaquarda continued in the series in 2010, competing for ISR Racing who took over the entry of RC Motorsport. He finished the season classified in 11th place, taking a double–pole position at his home round in Brno and podium places at Brno and Magny–Cours.

=== Other series ===
In 2008, Salaquarda originally signed to race for Brooks Associates Racing in the Atlantic Championship in the United States, but the deal fell through at the last minute when the driver funding fell through

Salaquarda also made his GP2 test debut in October 2009, driving two days for Trident Racing at the Jerez circuit in Spain.

== Racing record ==
=== Career summary ===
Season	Series	Team	Races	Wins	Poles	F/Laps	Podiums	Points	Position
2000	Ford Puma Cup	?	?	?	?	?	?	?	**3rd**
2001	Škoda Octavia Cup	?	?	?	?	?	?	?	13th
2002	Formula BMW ADAC	Team ISR	17	0	0	0	0	3	21st
2003	Formula BMW ADAC	SONAX-ISR-Charouz	20	0	0	0	1	49	13th
2004	German Formula Three Championship	Team ISR	17	0	0	0	0	42	11th
2005	Formula 3 Euro Series	Team ISR	20	0	0	0	0	0	23rd
2005	Macau Grand Prix	HBR Motorsport	1	0	0	0	0	N/A	NC
2006	Formula 3 Euro Series	Team ISR	20	0	0	0	0	0	22nd
2006	Masters of Formula 3	Team ISR	1	0	0	0	0	N/A	27th
2006	F3000 International Masters	Charouz Racing System	2	0	0	?	2	16	12th
2006–07	A1 Grand Prix	A1 Team Czech Republic	2	0	0	0	0	27†	12th†
2007	Formula 3 Euro Series	HBR Motorsport	19	0	0	0	0	3	17th
2007	Masters of Formula 3	HBR Motorsport	1	0	0	0	0	N/A	16th
2007	International Formula Master	Team ISR	2	0	0	0	0	0	36th
2007–08	A1 Grand Prix	A1 Team Czech Republic	6	0	0	0	0	10†	19th†
2008	International Formula Master	Team ISR	16	0	0	0	0	3	24th
2009	Le Mans Series - GT1	IPB Spartak Racing	1	0	0	0	1	8	10th
2009	Formula Renault 3.5 Series	RC Motorsport	13	0	0	0	0	1	29th
2009	Formula Renault 3.5 Series	Prema Powerteam	13	0	0	0	0	1	29th
2010	Formula Renault 3.5 Series	ISR Racing	14	0	2	0	2	44	11th
2011	Formula Renault 3.5 Series	Pons Racing	2	0	0	0	0	0	34th
2011	Superleague Formula	Pons Racing	4	0	0	1	0	95	9th
2011	German Formula Three Championship	Brandl Racing	2	0	0	0	0	2	18th
2011	FIA GT3 European Championship	Scuderia Vittoria	2	0	0	1	1	18	26th
2011	Blancpain Endurance Series - Pro	Vita4One	2	0	0	0	1	27	18th
2012	GT1 World Championship	AF Corse	18	2	2	0	3	84	7th
2012	Blancpain Endurance Series - Pro-Am	Vita4One Team Italy	1	0	0	0	0	0	NC
2013	FIA GT Series	AF Corse	8	0	0	0	2	34	13th
2013	International GT Open - GTS	AF Corse	4	0	0	0	1	13	24th
2013	Gulf 12 Hours - GT3 Pro-Am	Kessel Racing	1	0	0	0	0	N/A	12th
2014	Blancpain GT Series	Scuderia Villorba Corse	8	0	0	0	0	13	35th
2014	Blancpain GT Series	ISR Racing	3	0	0	0	0	0	35th
2014	Blancpain GT Series	Bhaitech	2	0	0	0	0	0	35th
2015	Blancpain GT Series	ISR Racing	14	0	0	0	0	40	21st
2016	Blancpain GT Series	ISR Racing	17	0	0	0	0	17	47th
2017	Blancpain GT Series	ISR Racing	14	0	0	0	1	31	24th
2017	Intercontinental GT Challenge	Audi Sport Team ISR	1	0	0	0	0	0	NC
2017	ADAC GT Masters	BWT Mücke Motorsport	14	0	0	0	0	20	28th
2018	ADAC GT Masters	Team ISR	14	1	1	0	1	57	9th
2019	ADAC GT Masters	Team ISR	14	0	0	0	0	67	16th
2020	ADAC GT Masters	Team ISR	13	0	0	0	0	15	32nd
2021	Italian GT Endurance Championship - GT3	Audi Sport Italia	4	0	0	1	0	14	10th
2023	ESET Cup Endurance - GT3	ISR Racing	3	3	3	3	3	75	**1st***
2023	ESET Cup Sprint - GT3	ISR Racing	6	5	6	5	6	75	**1st***
2024	International GT Open	ISR Racing	13	0	0	0	0	0	44th
2025	International GT Open	Team ISR	14	0	0	0	0	9	25th
2026	International GT Open	Team ISR	14	0	0	0	0	16	21st

† – Team standings.

=== Complete Formula BMW ADAC results ===
(key) (Races in bold indicate pole position) (Races in italics indicate fastest lap)

Year	Entrant	1	2	3	4	5	6	7	8	9	10	11	12	13	14	15	16	17	18	19	20	DC	Points
2002	Igor Salaquarda Racing	HOC1; 1; 20	HOC1; 2; 17	ZOL; 1; 17	ZOL; 2; 10	SAC; 1 Ret	SAC; 2; 18	NÜR1; 1 DNS	NÜR1; 2; 16	NOR; 1 Ret	NOR; 2; 14	LAU; 1; 15	LAU; 2; 16	NÜR2; 1; 17	NÜR2; 2; 24	A1R; 1; 17	A1R; 2 Ret	ZAN; 1	ZAN; 2	HOC2; 1; 12	HOC2; 2; 9	21st	3
2003	Igor Salaquarda Racing	HOC1; 1; 14	HOC1; 2 Ret	ADR; 1; 18	ADR; 2 Ret	NÜR1; 1 Ret	NÜR1; 2; 16	LAU; 1; 21	LAU; 2 Ret	NOR; 1; 6	NOR; 2; 6	NÜR2; 1; 4	NÜR2; 2; 5	NÜR3; 1; 14	NÜR3; 2 Ret	A1R; 1; 9	A1R; 2; 10	ZAN; 1; 7	ZAN; 2; 12	HOC2; 1; 18	HOC2; 2; 3	13th	49

=== Complete ATS Formel 3 Cup results ===
(key) (Races in bold indicate pole position) (Races in italics indicate fastest lap)

Year	Entrant	Chassis	Engine	1	2	3	4	5	6	7	8	9	10	11	12	13	14	15	16	17	18	DC	Points
2004	Team I.S.R.	Dallara F303	Opel	HOC; 1 Ret	HOC; 2 DNS	OSC1; 1; 4	OSC1; 2; 11	ASS; 1 Ret	ASS; 2 Ret	LAU1; 1; 5	LAU1; 2; 8	NÜR1; 1; 13	NÜR1; 2; 5	SAC; 1 Ret	SAC; 2; 9	NÜR2; 1 Ret	NÜR2; 2; 6	LAU2; 1; 9	LAU2; 2; 11	OSC2; 1 Ret	OSC2; 2; 8	11th	42

=== Complete Formula 3 Euro Series results ===
(key) (Races in bold indicate pole position) (Races in italics indicate fastest lap)

Year	Entrant	Chassis	Engine	1	2	3	4	5	6	7	8	9	10	11	12	13	14	15	16	17	18	19	20	DC	Points
2005	Team ISR	Dallara F305/046	Spiess-Opel	HOC; 1 Ret	HOC; 2 Ret	PAU; 1; 17	PAU; 2 Ret	SPA; 1; 11	SPA; 2 Ret	MON; 1; 19†	MON; 2; 13	OSC; 1; 14	OSC; 2; 19	NOR; 1; 14	NOR; 2; 15	NÜR; 1; 22	NÜR; 2; 19†	ZAN; 1; 13	ZAN; 2; 14	LAU; 1; 19	LAU; 2; 17	HOC; 1; 11	HOC; 2; 16	23rd	0
2006	Team ISR	Dallara F306/009	Spiess-Opel	HOC; 1 Ret	HOC; 2; 15	LAU; 1; 14	LAU; 2 Ret	OSC; 1; 14	OSC; 2; 10	BRH; 1; 20	BRH; 2; 18	NOR; 1; 14	NOR; 2; 17†	NÜR; 1; 15	NÜR; 2; 7	ZAN; 1; 15	ZAN; 2; 10	CAT; 1; 15	CAT; 2 Ret	LMS; 1; 16	LMS; 2; 18	HOC; 1 Ret	HOC; 2; 11	22nd	0
2007	HBR Motorsport	Dallara F306/009	Mercedes	HOC; 1; 20	HOC; 2; 12	BRH; 1; 14	BRH; 2; 17	NOR; 1 DSQ	NOR; 2 DSQ	MAG; 1; 17	MAG; 2; 15	MUG; 1; 13	MUG; 2 Ret	ZAN; 1; 10	ZAN; 2; 10	NÜR; 1; 9	NÜR; 2; 18	CAT; 1; 11	CAT; 2; 5	NOG; 1; 13	NOG; 2; 15	HOC; 1; 20	HOC; 2; 18	17th	3

† Driver did not finish the race, but was classified as he completed over 90% of the race distance.

=== Complete International Formula Master results ===
(key) (Races in bold indicate pole position) (Races in italics indicate fastest lap)

Year	Team	1	2	3	4	5	6	7	8	9	10	11	12	13	14	15	16	Pos	Points
2006	Charouz Racing System	MNZ; 1	MNZ; 2	MAG; 1	MAG; 2	BRH; 1	BRH; 2	OSC; 1; 2	OSC; 2; 2	BRN; 1	BRN; 2	IST; 1	IST; 2	EST; 1	EST; 2	EST; 3	EST; 4	12th	16
2007	ISR Racing	VAL; 1	VAL; 2	PAU; 1	PAU; 2	BRN; 1	BRN; 2	BOA; 1	BOA; 2	AND; 1	AND; 2	OSC; 1	OSC; 2	BRH; 1	BRH; 2	MNZ; 1 Ret	MNZ; 2; 16	36th	0
2008	ISR Racing	VAL; 1; 6	VAL; 2 Ret	PAU; 1 DNS	PAU; 2 DNS	BRN; 1 Ret	BRN; 2 Ret	EST; 1; 22	EST; 2; 11	BRH; 1 Ret	BRH; 2; 13	OSC; 1 Ret	OSC; 2 Ret	IMO; 1 DNS	IMO; 2 DNS	MNZ; 1 Ret	MNZ; 2 DNS	24th	3

=== Complete A1 Grand Prix results ===
(key) (Races in bold indicate pole position) (Races in italics indicate fastest lap)

Year	Entrant	1	2	3	4	5	6	7	8	9	10	11	12	13	14	15	16	17	18	19	20	21	22	DC	Points
2006–07	Czech Republic	NED; SPR	NED; FEA	CZE; SPR	CZE; FEA	BEI; SPR	BEI; FEA	MYS; SPR	MYS; FEA	IDN; SPR	IDN; FEA	NZL; SPR	NZL; FEA	AUS; SPR	AUS; FEA	RSA; SPR	RSA; FEA	MEX; SPR	MEX; FEA	SHA; SPR; 17	SHA; FEA; 10	GBR; SPR	GBR; SPR	12th	27
2007–08	Czech Republic	NED; SPR	NED; FEA	CZE; SPR	CZE; FEA	MYS; SPR	MYS; FEA	ZHU; SPR	ZHU; FEA	NZL; SPR	NZL; FEA	AUS; SPR	AUS; FEA	RSA; SPR	RSA; FEA	MEX; SPR; Ret	MEX; FEA; 16	SHA; SPR; 13	SHA; FEA; 11	GBR; SPR; 12	GBR; SPR; 15			19th	10

=== Complete Formula Renault 3.5 Series results ===
(key) (Races in bold indicate pole position) (Races in italics indicate fastest lap)

Year	Team	1	2	3	4	5	6	7	8	9	10	11	12	13	14	15	16	17	Pos	Points
2009	RC Motorsport	CAT; 1	CAT; 2	SPA; 1	SPA; 2	MON; 1; 21													27th	1
2009	Prema Powerteam						HUN; 1 Ret	HUN; 2 NC	SIL; 1; 19	SIL; 2; 17	BUG; 1 Ret	BUG; 2; 16	ALG; 1; 10	ALG; 2; 12	NÜR; 1 Ret	NÜR; 2 Ret	ALC; 1; 12	ALC; 2; 15	27th	1
2010	ISR Racing	ALC; 1 Ret	ALC; 2 Ret	SPA; 1 DNS	SPA; 2; 15	MON; 1; 8	**BRN**; **1**; 15	**BRN**; **2**; 3	MAG; 1; 15	MAG; 2; 3	HUN; 1	HUN; 2	HOC; 1 Ret	HOC; 2; 7	SIL; 1; 5	SIL; 2; 4	CAT; 1; 8	CAT; 2; 19	11th	44
2011	Pons Racing	ALC; 1	ALC; 2	SPA; 1	SPA; 2	MNZ; 1; 15	MNZ; 2; 18	MON; 1	NÜR; 1	NÜR; 2	HUN; 1	HUN; 2	SIL; 1	SIL; 2	LEC; 1	LEC; 2	CAT; 1	CAT; 2	34th	0

=== Complete Superleague Formula results ===
(key) (Races in bold indicate pole position) (Races in italics indicate fastest lap)

Year	Team	1	2	3	4	Pos	Pts
2011	Czech Republic AC Sparta Prague Atech Reid Grand Prix	HOL; 1; 5	HOL; 2; 6	BEL; 1; 12	BEL; 2; 10	9th	95

==== Super Final Results ====
- Super Final results in 2009 did not count for points towards the main championship.

Year	Team	1	2
2011	Czech Republic AC Sparta Prague Atech Reid Grand Prix	HOL; 5	BEL; DNQ

=== FIA GT competition results ===
==== GT1 World Championship results ====
Year	Team	Car	1	2	3	4	5	6	7	8	9	10	11	12	13	14	15	16	17	18	Pos	Points
2012	AF Corse	Ferrari 458 Italia GT3	NOG; QR; 5	NOG; CR; 6	ZOL; QR; 13	ZOL; CR; 3	NAV; QR; 10	NAV; QR; 9	SVK; QR; 1	SVK; CR; 4	ALG; QR; 12	ALG; CR; Ret	SVK; QR; 7	SVK; CR; 6	MOS; QR; 9	MOS; CR; Ret	NUR; QR; 8	NUR; CR; 1	DON; QR; Ret	DON; CR; 8	7th	84

==== FIA GT Series results ====
Year	Team	Car	Class	1	2	3	4	5	6	7	8	9	10	11	12	Pos.	Points
2013	AF Corse	Ferrari 458 Italia GT3	Pro-Am	NOG; QR; DNS	NOG; CR; DNS	ZOL; QR; 9	ZOL; CR; 12	ZAN; QR; Ret	ZAN; QR; Ret	SVK; QR; 13	SVK; CR; 9	NAV; QR	NAV; CR	TBA; QR	TBA; CR	13th	34

=== Complete Blancpain GT Series Sprint Cup results ===
Year	Team	Car	Class	1	2	3	4	5	6	7	8	9	10	11	12	13	14	Pos.	Points
2014	Scuderia Villorba Corse	Ferrari 458 Italia GT3	Pro	NOG; QR; 8	NOG; CR; 10	BRH; QR; 7	BRH; CR; 7	ZAN; QR; 17	ZAN; CR; DNS	SVK; QR; Ret	SVK; CR; DNS	ALG; QR	ALG; CR	ZOL; QR; 9	ZOL; CR; 7			22nd	13
2014	Bhaitech	McLaren MP4-12C GT3	Pro													BAK; QR; 20	BAK; CR; 16	22nd	13
2015	ISR	Audi R8 LMS ultra	Pro	NOG; QR; 6	NOG; CR; 7	BRH; QR; 12	BRH; CR; 11	ZOL; QR; 10	ZOL; CR; 7	MOS; QR; 14	MOS; CR; Ret	ALG; QR; 9	ALG; CR; 11	MIS; QR; 13	MIS; CR; 10	ZAN; QR; 11	ZAN; CR; 4	16th	26
2016	ISR	Audi R8 LMS	Pro	MIS; QR; 8	MIS; CR; 5	BRH; QR; 17	BRH; CR; 20	NÜR; QR; Ret	NÜR; CR; 20	HUN; QR; 7	HUN; CR; 21	CAT; QR; 21	CAT; CR; 12					19th	10
2017	ISR	Audi R8 LMS	Pro	MIS; QR; 10	MIS; CR; 15	BRH; QR; 12	BRH; CR; Ret	ZOL; QR; 4	ZOL; CR; 2	HUN; QR; 17	HUN; CR; DNS	NÜR; QR	NÜR; CR					12th	21
