= ISR Racing =

(Czech Republic) ISR
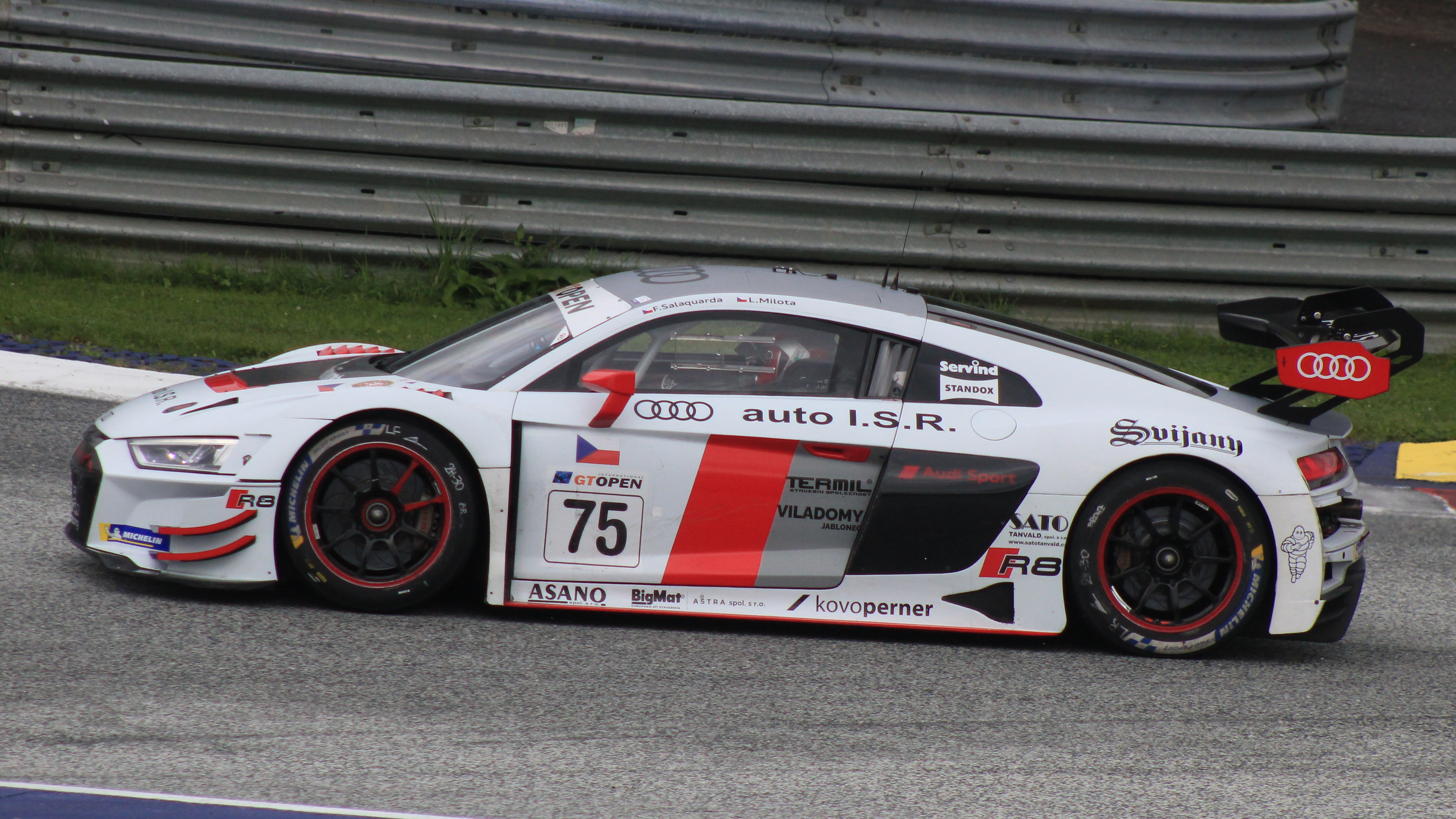
- Founded: 1993
- Team principal(s): Igor Salaquarda
- Former series: ADAC GT Masters; Blancpain Sprint Series; Blancpain Endurance Series; Formula 3000; Euro Formula 3000; Formula 3 Euroseries; German Formula 3 Formula BMW ADAC; CE Super Touring; Formula Master; Formula Renault 3.5
- Drivers' Championships: 1998 CE Super Touring (Venc); 1999 CE Super Touring (Venc)

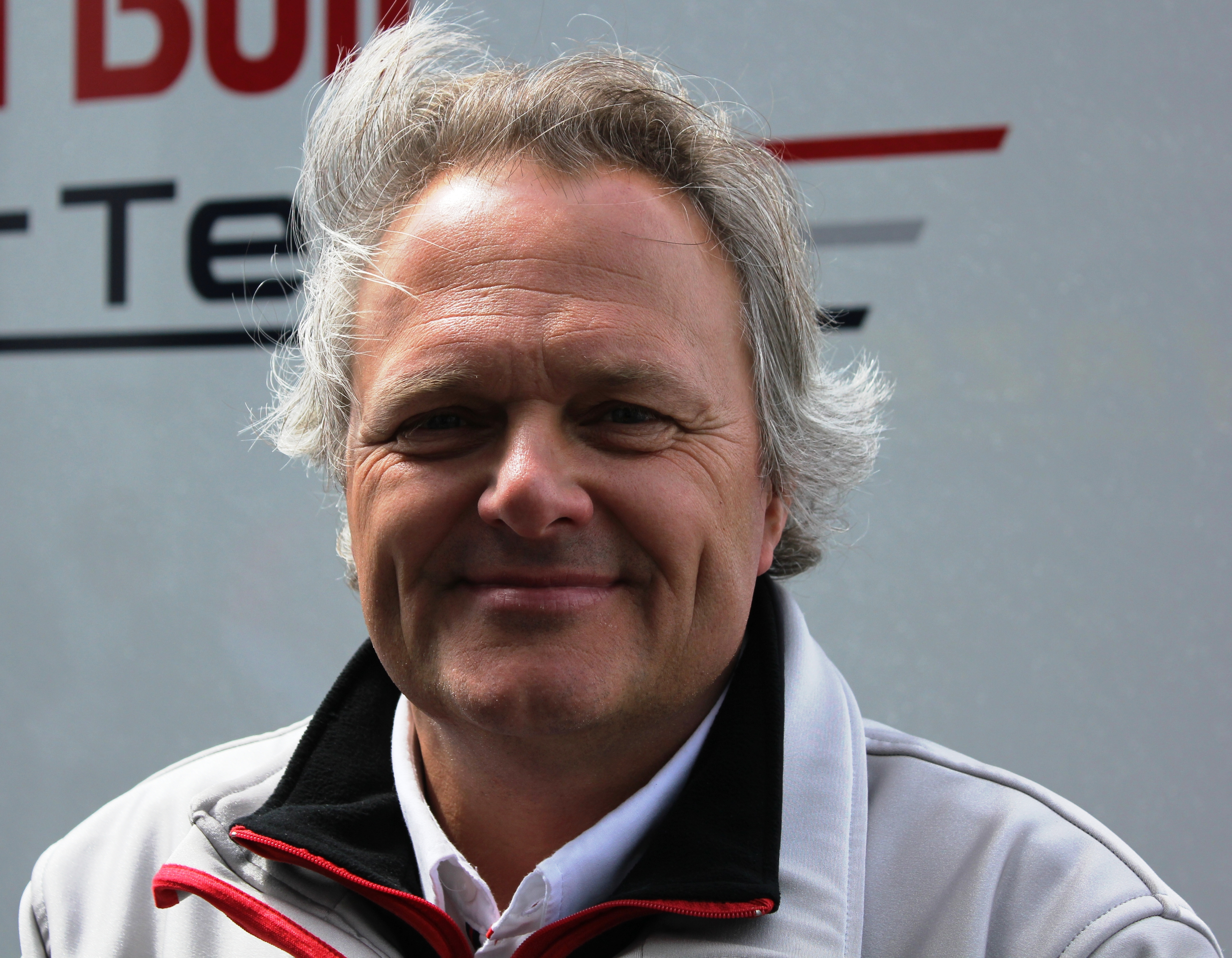
Team Principal Igor Salaquarda in 2011

ISR Racing (also known as Coca-Cola Racing Team in FIA GT) is a racing team from Czech Republic, created in 1993 by Igor Salaquarda. The team is currently competing in ADAC GT Masters.

== History ==
The company was created to develop the Peugeot 306 Cup of Peugeot Cup racing.

Later, in 1996, ISR started racing in Super Touring with Audi 80 quattro and Czech driver Josef Venc. The team won the drivers' title in the Central-European Super Touring Championship in 1998 and 1999.

In 1999, ISR started building a 500m² workshop for the preparation of racing cars.

In 2001, the team prepared cars for the FIA GT Championship with Tomáš Enge, Justin Wilson and Antonín Charouz. Charouz also won the Czech GT Championship with a Porsche 911 GT3.

The next year, ISR started racing in Euro Formula 3000. The team also raced in Formula BMW ADAC in 2003, and the Recaro Formule 3 CUP in 2004.

In 2005 and 2006 ISR took part in the Formula Three Euroseries with Filip Salaquarda but they failed to finish any race in a point-scoring position.

In 2007, ISR raced in the new International Formula Master series.

ISR will take over the RC Motorsport team's entry for the 2010 World Series by Renault season.

ISR were not listed on the provisional list of teams for the 2015 World Series by Renault season, and are unlikely to be fielding a team.

== Complete former series results ==
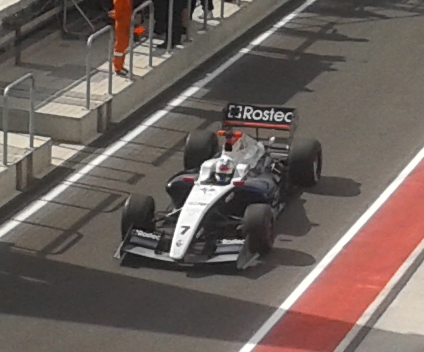
Sirotkin driving for ISR at the Moscow Raceway round of the 2013 Formula Renault 3.5 Series season.

=== Formula Renault 3.5 ===
Formula Renault 3.5 Results
Year	Car	Drivers	Races	Wins	Poles	F.L.	Points	D.C.	T.C.
2010	Dallara T08-Renault	(Argentina) Esteban Guerrieri	13	6	3	4	123	3rd	2nd
2010	Dallara T08-Renault	(United States) Alexander Rossi	1	0	0	0	0	NC	2nd
2010	Dallara T08-Renault	(Czech Republic) Filip Salaquarda	14	0	2	0	44	11th	2nd
2011	Dallara T08-Renault	(United Kingdom) Lewis Williamson	4	0	0	0	0	33rd	3rd
2011	Dallara T08-Renault	(Australia) Daniel Ricciardo	12	1	2	3	144	5th	3rd
2011	Dallara T08-Renault	(France) Nathanaël Berthon	17	0	0	0	37	13th	3rd
2012	Dallara FR35/12-Renault	(United Kingdom) Sam Bird	17	2	1	0	179	3rd	4th
2012	Dallara FR35/12-Renault	(United States) Jake Rosenzweig	17	0	0	0	8	21st	4th
2013	Dallara FR35/12-Renault	(Russia) Sergey Sirotkin	16	0	0	0	61	9th	8th
2013	Dallara FR35/12-Renault	(Switzerland) Christopher Zanella	17	0	0	0	25	16th	8th
2014	Dallara FR35/12-Renault	(Malaysia) Jazeman Jaafar	17	0	0	0	73	10th	8th

=== International Formula Master ===
International Formula Master results
Year	Car	Drivers	Races	Wins	Poles	F.L.	Points	D.C.	T.C.
2007	Tatuus IFM-Mader	(Germany) Maximilian Götz	6	0	3	3	24	10th	8th
2007	Tatuus IFM-Mader	(Netherlands) Nick de Bruijn	10	0	0	0	4	21st^{1}	8th
2007	Tatuus IFM-Mader	(Czech Republic) Erik Janis	4	0	0	0	2	25th	8th
2007	Tatuus IFM-Mader	(Czech Republic) Filip Salaquarda	2	0	0	0	0	NC	8th
2008	Tatuus IFM-Honda	(Czech Republic) Filip Salaquarda	11	0	0	0	3	24th	9th
2008	Tatuus IFM-Honda	(Germany) Tim Sandtler	16	0	0	0	13	14th	9th
2009	Tatuus IFM-Honda	(United States) Alexander Rossi	12	3	0	1	47	4th^{2}	3rd
2009	Tatuus IFM-Honda	(Czech Republic) Erik Janiš	12	0	0	0	42	6th	3rd

=== Formula 3 ===
Formula 3 Euro Series results
Year	Car	Drivers	Races	Wins	Poles	F.L.	Points	D.C.	T.C.
2005	Dallara F305-Spiess Opel	(Czech Republic) Filip Salaquarda	20	0	0	0	0	NC	NC
2006	Dallara F306-Spiess Opel	(Czech Republic) Filip Salaquarda	20	0	0	0	0	NC	NC

German Formula 3 Championship results
Year	Car	Drivers	Races	Wins	Poles	F.L.	Points	D.C.	T.C.
2004	Dallara F303-Spiess Opel	(Czech Republic) Filip Salaquarda	17	0	0	0	42	11th	10th

Formula Three Special races results
Year	Car	Race	Driver	Grid	Pos.
2006	Dallara F306-Spiess Opel	Masters of Formula 3	(Czech Republic) Filip Salaquarda	32nd	27th

=== Formula 3000 ===
International Formula 3000 results
Year	Car	Drivers	Races	Wins	Poles	F.L.	Points	D.C.	T.C.
2003	Lola B02/50-Zytek Judd	(Czech Republic) Jaroslav Janiš	9	0	0	0	20	7th	6th
2003	Lola B02/50-Zytek Judd	(France) Yannick Schroeder	8	0	0	0	13	12th	6th

=== Formula BMW ===
Formula BMW ADAC Results
Year	Car	Drivers	Races	Wins	Poles	F.L.	Points	D.C.	T.C.
2002	Mygale FB02-BMW	(Czech Republic) Filip Salaquarda	17	0	0	0	3	21st	15th
2002	Mygale FB02-BMW	(Czech Republic) Tomáš Kostka	12	0	0	0	0	NC	15th
2002	Mygale FB02-BMW	(Czech Republic) Marek Novotny	11	0	0	0	0	NC	15th
2003	Mygale FB02-BMW	(Czech Republic) Filip Salaquarda	20	0	0	0	49	13th	9th
2003	Mygale FB02-BMW	(Czech Republic) Jan Charouz	2	0	0	0	0	NC^{3}	9th

=== Euro Formula 3000 ===
Euro Formula 3000 results
Year	Car	Drivers	Races	Wins	Poles	F.L.	Points	D.C.	T.C.
2002	Lola B99/50-Zytek	(Czech Republic) Jaroslav Janiš	9	2	3	3	36	3rd	2nd
2002	Lola B99/50-Zytek	(Brazil) Juliano Moro	4	0	0	0	0	NC	2nd
2002	Lola B99/50-Zytek	(France) Yannick Schroeder	5	0	0	0	13	6th^{4}	2nd

Notes:

- 1. - Nick de Bruijn also scored 3 points for ADM Motorsport in 6 races.
- 2. - Rossi also scored 5 points in 4 races for Hitech Junior Team.
- 3. - Charouz also entered in 14 races for Eifelland Racing.
- 4. - Schroeder also scored 1 point in 4 races for Uboldi Corse.

== Timeline ==
Type	1990s										2000s									2010s
Type	93	94	95	96	97	98	99	00	01	02	03	04	05	06	07	08	09	10	11	12	13	14	15
Formulas										Formula BMW ADAC		GF3	F3 Euroseries		Formula Master			Formula Renault 3.5 Series
Formulas										Euro F3000	F3000
Sports Car									FIA GT														BSS
Sports Car																						BES
