= Maximilian Götz =

German racing driver

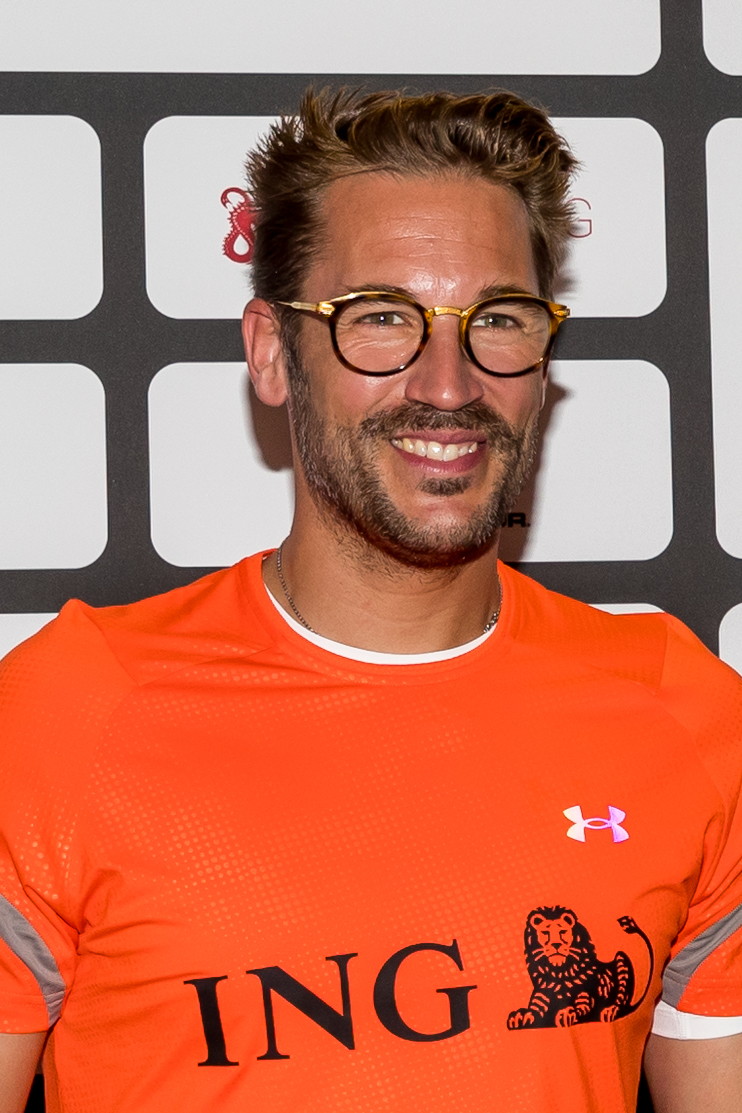
- Götz in 2022
- Nationality: (Germany) German
- Born: 4 February 1986 (age 40) Ochsenfurt, West Germany

Deutsche Tourenwagen Masters career
- Debut season: 2015
- Current team: Mercedes-AMG Team Winward Racing
- Categorisation: FIA Silver (until 2013); FIA Gold (2014–2015); FIA Platinum (2016–)
- Car number: 1
- Former teams: Mücke Motorsport, HWA Team, Mercedes-AMG Team HRT
- Starts: 68
- Wins: 3
- Poles: 0
- Fastest laps: 1
- Best finish: 1st in 2021

Previous series
- 2014 2013-14 2010-14 2007-08 2007 2004-05 2002-03: Blancpain Sprint Series; Blancpain Endurance Series; ADAC GT Masters; Formula 3 Euro Series; International Formula Master; Formula 3 Euro Series; Formula BMW ADAC

Championship titles
- 2021 2014 2012 2003: Deutsche Tourenwagen Masters; Blancpain Sprint Series; ADAC GT Masters; Formula BMW ADAC

Maximilian "Maxi" Götz (born 4 February 1986) is a German racing driver. He has competed in such series as International Formula Master and the Formula 3 Euro Series. He won the 2003 Formula BMW ADAC season, taking six victories, as well as the 2012 ADAC GT Masters and the 2014 Blancpain Sprint Series in the Cup class. He also won the 2021 Deutsche Tourenwagen Masters, in a highly controversial fashion, by finishing three points ahead of Liam Lawson in the drivers' championship.

== Career ==
=== IMSA SportsCar Championship ===
On January 5, 2022, Alegra Motorsports announced that Götz would compete alongside Linus Lundqvist, Daniel Morad and Michael de Quesada in the No. 28 Mercedes for the 2022 24 Hours of Daytona.

=== FIA World Endurance Championship ===
In 2023, Goetz began a partnership with Scuderia Cameron Glickenhaus, appearing as a guest of the team at the pre-season WEC Prologue.

== Racing record ==
=== Career summary ===
Season	Series	Team	Races	Wins	Poles	F/Laps	Podiums	Points	Position
2002	Formula BMW ADAC	Mücke Motorsport	20	3	2	3	11	183	**2nd**
2003	Formula BMW ADAC	Mücke Motorsport	20	6	4	6	13	259	**1st**
2004	Formula 3 Euro Series	Maximilian Götz	18	0	0	0	0	3	19th
2004	Formula 3 Euro Series	Team Kolles	2	0	0	0	0	3	19th
2004	Masters of Formula 3	TME Racing	1	0	0	0	0	N/A	32nd
2005	Formula 3 Euro Series	HBR Motorsport	8	0	0	0	0	13	14th
2005	Formula 3 Euro Series	ASM Formule 3	2	0	0	0	1	13	14th
2007	Formula 3 Euro Series	RC Motorsport	8	0	0	0	0	0	NC†
2007	International Formula Master	ISR Racing	6	0	3	3	2	24	10th
2008	Formula 3 Euro Series	RC Motorsport powered by Volkswagen	8	0	0	0	0	3	22nd
2009	Lamborghini Blancpain Super Trofeo	Lamborghini München Team Holzer	3	0	0	0	1	41	7th
2010	ADAC GT Masters	s-Berg Racing	2	0	0	0	0	0	NC
2011	ADAC GT Masters	Oliver Mayer	2	0	0	0	0	38	20th
2011	ADAC GT Masters	Maximilian Mayer	2	0	0	0	0	38	20th
2011	ADAC GT Masters	MS-Racing	12	0	0	0	1	38	20th
2012	ADAC GT Masters	kfzteile24 MS Racing Team	16	1	2	1	8	167	**1st**
2013	ADAC GT Masters	Polarweiss Racing	16	1	1	1	6	165	**3rd**
2013	Blancpain Endurance Series	HTP Motorsport	2	2	2	0	2	71	**2nd**
2014	ADAC GT Masters	HTP Motorsport	16	2	0	1	6	136	5th
2014	Blancpain GT Sprint Series	HTP Motorsport	14	3	0	0	8	142	**1st**
2014	Blancpain Endurance Series	HTP Motorsport	1	0	0	0	0	18	16th
2014	24 Hours of Nürburgring - SP9	HTP Motorsport	1	0	0	0	0	N/A	7th
2015	Deutsche Tourenwagen Masters	Petronas Mercedes-AMG	18	0	0	0	0	25	22nd
2015	24 Hours of Nürburgring - SP9	Haribo Racing Team	1	0	0	0	0	N/A	DNF
2016	Deutsche Tourenwagen Masters	Mercedes-Benz DTM Team HWA	18	0	0	0	0	17	20th
2016	Blancpain GT Series Endurance Cup	AMG - Team HTP Motorsport	1	0	0	0	0	12	29th
2016	Intercontinental GT Challenge	AMG - Team HTP Motorsport	1	0	0	0	0	12	12th
2016	24 Hours of Nürburgring - SP9	Haribo Racing Team - AMG	1	0	0	0	1	N/A	**3rd**
2017	ADAC GT Masters	Mercedes-AMG Team HTP Motorsport	14	0	0	0	1	60	16th
2017	Blancpain GT Series Asia	GruppeM Racing Team	2	1	0	0	1	31	17th
2017	Blancpain GT Series Endurance Cup	Black Falcon	1	0	0	0	0	0	NC
2017	Intercontinental GT Challenge	Black Falcon	1	0	0	0	0	0	NC
2017	24H Series - SP2	Mercedes-AMG Testteam Winward Racing/HTP Motorsport	1	0	0	1	0	0	NC
2017	24 Hours of Nürburgring - SP9	Haribo Racing Team - Mercedes-AMG	1	0	0	0	0	N/A	9th
2018	ADAC GT Masters	Mann-Filter Team HTP	14	1	2	1	4	117	4th
2018	Blancpain GT Series Endurance Cup	Mercedes-AMG Team Strakka Racing	5	0	0	0	1	24	19th
2018	Intercontinental GT Challenge	Mercedes-AMG Team Strakka Racing	4	0	0	0	1	34	8th
2018	24 Hours of Nürburgring - SP9	Mercedes-AMG Team Mann Filter	1	0	0	0	0	N/A	16th
2019	ADAC GT Masters	Mann-Filter Team HTP	14	1	1	0	3	145	**3rd**
2019	Blancpain GT World Challenge Asia	Craft-Bamboo Racing	2	0	0	0	0	0	NC
2019	Blancpain GT Series Endurance Cup	Mercedes-AMG Team GruppeM Racing	1	0	0	0	0	10	22nd
2019	Intercontinental GT Challenge	Mercedes-AMG Team GruppeM Racing	3	0	1	1	2	62	**2nd**
2019	Intercontinental GT Challenge	Mercedes-AMG Team Craft-Bamboo Racing	1	0	0	0	0	62	**2nd**
2019	Intercontinental GT Challenge	Mercedes-AMG Team SPS Automotive Performance	1	0	0	0	0	62	**2nd**
2019	24 Hours of Nürburgring - SP9	Mercedes-AMG Team Mann Filter	1	0	0	0	0	N/A	DNF
2020	ADAC GT Masters	Mann-Filter - Team HTP-Winward	14	0	0	0	1	87	9th
2020	Intercontinental GT Challenge	Triple Eight Race Engineering	1	0	0	0	1	18	13th
2020	24H GT Series - GT3	HTP Winward Motorsport	1	0	0	0	0	14	11th
2020	24 Hours of Nürburgring - SP9	Mercedes-AMG Team GetSpeed	1	0	0	0	0	N/A	DNF
2021	Deutsche Tourenwagen Masters	Mercedes-AMG Team HRT	16	3	0	0	9	230	**1st**
2021	GT World Challenge Europe Endurance Cup	HubAuto Racing	1	0	0	0	0	0	NC
2021	Intercontinental GT Challenge	HubAuto Racing	1	0	0	0	0	0	NC
2021	24 Hours of Nürburgring - SP9	Mercedes-AMG Team GetSpeed	1	0	0	0	1	N/A	**3rd**
2022	Deutsche Tourenwagen Masters	Mercedes-AMG Team Winward Racing	16	0	0	1	1	74	11th
2022	GT World Challenge Europe Sprint Cup	AKKodis ASP Team	2	0	0	0	1	12.5	12th
2022	IMSA SportsCar Championship - GTD	Alegra Motorsports	2	0	0	0	0	379	46th
2022	IMSA SportsCar Championship - GTD Pro	WeatherTech Racing	1	0	0	0	0	275	29th
2022	ADAC GT Masters	Madpanda Motorsport	4	0	0	0	0	16	30th
2022	GT World Challenge Europe Endurance Cup	BWT AMG Team GetSpeed	1	0	0	0	1	22	18th
2022	Intercontinental GT Challenge	Mercedes-AMG Team GetSpeed	1	0	0	0	1	18	13th
2022	Intercontinental GT Challenge	Mercedes-AMG GruppeM Racing	1	0	1	0	0	18	13th
2022	24 Hours of Nürburgring - SP9	Mercedes-AMG Team GetSpeed BWT	1	0	0	0	1	N/A	**2nd**
2023	ADAC GT Masters	Haupt Racing Team	6	0	0	1	2	75	9th
2023	GT World Challenge Europe Endurance Cup	AKKodis ASP Team	5	0	0	0	0	6	22nd
2023	GT World Challenge Asia - GT3	Craft-Bamboo Racing	12	0	0	0	1	29	21st
2023	IMSA SportsCar Championship - GTD	Team Korthoff Motorsports	1	0	0	0	0	192	59th
2023	Intercontinental GT Challenge	Mercedes-AMG Craft-Bamboo Racing	1	0	0	0	1	33	14th
2023	Intercontinental GT Challenge	Mercedes-AMG Team 2 Seas	1	0	0	0	1	33	14th
2023	24 Hours of Nürburgring - SP9	Mercedes-AMG Team GetSpeed	1	0	0	0	0	N/A	4th
2024	British GT Championship - GT3	2 Seas Motorsport	9	2	2	1	2	75	7th
2024	IMSA SportsCar Championship - GTD	Korthoff/Preston Motorsports	1	0	0	0	0	273	52nd
2024	GT World Challenge Asia	Craft-Bamboo Racing	4	0	0	?	0	0	NC
2024	GT World Challenge Europe Sprint Cup	Boutsen VDS	9	1	1	1	3	35.5	7th
2024	GT World Challenge Europe Endurance Cup	Boutsen VDS	5	0	0	0	0	24	12th
2024	Intercontinental GT Challenge	Boutsen VDS	1	0	0	0	0	21	12th
2024	Intercontinental GT Challenge	Mercedes-AMG Team Craft-Bamboo Racing	1	0	0	0	0	21	12th
2024	Intercontinental GT Challenge	Mercedes-AMG Team Bilstein by HRT	1	0	0	0	1	21	12th
2024	Nürburgring Langstrecken-Serie - SP9	Mercedes-AMG Team Bilstein by HRT							
2024	24 Hours of Nürburgring - SP9	Mercedes-AMG Team Bilstein by HRT	1	0	0	0	0	N/A	4th
2025	British GT Championship - GT3	2 Seas Motorsport	9	2	3	0	6	141.5	**3rd**
2025	IMSA SportsCar Championship - GTD	Korthoff Competition Motors	2	0	0	0	0	392	51st
2025	GT World Challenge Europe Endurance Cup	Boutsen VDS	5	0	0	0	0	1	27th
2025	Intercontinental GT Challenge	Boutsen VDS	1	0	0	0	0	12	25th
2025	Intercontinental GT Challenge	Mercedes-AMG Team Craft-Bamboo Racing	2	0	0	0	0	12	25th
2025	International GT Open	Team Motopark	10	3	1	1	5	105	5th
2026	IMSA SportsCar Championship - GTD Pro	Bartone Bros with GetSpeed	1	0	0	0	0	225	41st
2026	GT World Challenge Europe Endurance Cup	Mercedes-AMG Team GetSpeed	5	1	0	0	1	41	5th
2026	Intercontinental GT Challenge	Mercedes-AMG Team GetSpeed	1	0	0	0	0	0	NC
2026	Intercontinental GT Challenge	Mercedes-AMG Team Craft-Bamboo Racing	1	0	0	0	0	0	NC
2026	International GT Open	Team Motopark	14	2	3	1	7	117	5th

^{†} Guest driver ineligible to score points ^{*} Season still in progress.

=== Complete Formula 3 Euro Series results ===
(key) (Races in bold indicate pole position; races in italics indicate fastest lap)

Year	Team	Chassis	Engine	1	2	3	4	5	6	7	8	9	10	11	12	13	14	15	16	17	18	19	20	Pos	Points
2004	Maximilian Götz	Dallara F303/001	TOM's	HOC; 1; 10	HOC; 2; 11	EST; 1; 17	EST; 2 Ret	ADR; 1; 10	ADR; 1; 13	PAU; 1; 14	PAU; 2; 9	NOR; 1; 11	NOR; 1; 10	MAG; 1; 16	MAG; 2; 13	NÜR; 1; 16	NÜR; 2; 22	ZAN; 1; 9	ZAN; 2; 16	BRN; 1; 19	BRN; 2; 24			19th	3
2004	Team Kolles	Dallara F303/012	HWA-Mercedes																			HOC; 1; 6	HOC; 2; 15	19th	3
2005	HBR Motorsport	Dallara F305/040	Spiess-Opel	HOC; 1; 5	HOC; 2; 13	PAU; 1 Ret	PAU; 2 DSQ	SPA; 1; 8	SPA; 2; 11	MON; 1; 13	MON; 2; 7	OSC; 1	OSC; 2	NOR; 1	NOR; 2	NÜR; 1	NÜR; 2	ZAN; 1	ZAN; 2	LAU; 1	LAU; 2			14th	13
2005	ASM Formule 3	Dallara F305/059	HWA-Mercedes																			HOC; 1; 3	HOC; 2; 18†	14th	13
2007	RC Motorsport	Dallara F306/038	Volkswagen	HOC; 1	HOC; 2	BRH; 1	BRH; 2	NOR; 1	NOR; 2	MAG; 1	MAG; 2	MUG; 1	MUG; 2	ZAN; 1	ZAN; 2	NÜR; 1; 6	NÜR; 2; 9	CAT; 1; 20†	CAT; 2; 10	NOG; 1; 11	NOG; 2; 9	HOC; 1; 16	HOC; 2 Ret	NC‡	0‡
2008	RC Motorsport powered by Volkswagen	Dallara F308/077	Volkswagen	HOC; 1; 6	HOC; 2; 8	MUG; 1; 22	MUG; 2; 22	PAU; 1 Ret	PAU; 2 Ret	NOR; 1 Ret	NOR; 2; 20	ZAN; 1	ZAN; 2	NÜR; 1	NÜR; 2	BRH; 1	BRH; 2	CAT; 1	CAT; 2	BUG; 1	BUG; 2	HOC; 1	HOC; 2	22nd	3

^{†} Driver did not finish the race, but was classified as he completed over 90% of the race distance.
^{‡} As Götz was a guest driver, he was ineligible for championship points.

=== Complete ADAC GT Masters results ===
(key) (Races in bold indicate pole position; races in italics indicate fastest lap)

Year	Team	Car	1	2	3	4	5	6	7	8	9	10	11	12	13	14	15	16	Pos.	Points
2010	s-Berg Racing	Alpina B6 GT3	OSC; 1	OSC; 2	SAC; 1	SAC; 2	HOC; 1; 12	HOC; 2 Ret	ASS; 1	ASS; 2	LAU; 1	LAU; 2	NÜR; 1	NÜR; 2	OSC; 1	OSC; 2			47th	0
2011	Oliver Mayer	Ferrari 458 Italia GT3	OSC; 1; 31	OSC; 2; 24															20th	38
2011	Maximilian Mayer	Mercedes-Benz SLS AMG GT3			SAC; 1 Ret	SAC; 2; 7													20th	38
2011	MS-Racing	Mercedes-Benz SLS AMG GT3					ZOL; 1; 13	ZOL; 2; 11	NÜR; 1; 6	NÜR; 2; 18	RBR; 1; 14	RBR; 2; 20	LAU; 1; 13	LAU; 2; 8	ASS; 1; 10	ASS; 2 Ret	HOC; 1; 8	HOC; 2; 3	20th	38
2012	kfzteile24 MS Racing Team	Mercedes-Benz SLS AMG GT3	OSC; 1; 9	OSC; 2; 7	ZAN; 1; 2	ZAN; 2; 3	SAC; 1; 3	SAC; 2; 14	**NÜR**; **1**; 7	**NÜR**; **2**; 2	RBR; 1; 9	RBR; 2; 11	LAU; 1; 2	LAU; 2; 4	NÜR; 1; 3	NÜR; 2; 3	HOC; 1; 26	HOC; 2; 1	1st	167
2013	Polarweiss Racing	Mercedes-Benz SLS AMG GT3	**OSC**; **1**; 11	**OSC**; **2**; 9	SPA; 1; 2	SPA; 2; 2	SAC; 1; 5	SAC; 2; 10	NÜR; 1; 1	NÜR; 2 Ret	RBR; 1; 5	RBR; 2; 2	LAU; 1; 7	LAU; 2; 4	SVK; 1; 4	SVK; 2; 3	HOC; 1; 2	HOC; 2 Ret	3rd	165
2014	HTP Motorsport	Mercedes-Benz SLS AMG GT3	OSC; 1; 1	OSC; 2 Ret	ZAN; 1; 9	ZAN; 2; 6	LAU; 1; 1	LAU; 2; 16	RBR; 1; 3	RBR; 2; 3	SLO; 1; 21	SLO; 2; 19†	NÜR; 1; 7	NÜR; 2; 3	SAC; 1; 7	SAC; 2; 11	HOC; 1; 8	HOC; 2; 3	5th	136
2017	Mercedes-AMG Team HTP Motorsport	Mercedes-AMG GT3	OSC; 1; 16	OSC; 2; 20	LAU; 1; 19	LAU; 2; 6	RBR; 1; 6	RBR; 2; 4	ZAN; 1; 9	ZAN; 2 Ret	NÜR; 1; 7	NÜR; 2 Ret	SAC; 1; 7	SAC; 2; 2	HOC; 1 Ret	HOC; 2 Ret			16th	60
2018	Mann-Filter Team HTP	Mercedes-AMG GT3	OSC; 1; 9	OSC; 2; 5	MST; 1 Ret	**MST**; **2**; 1	RBR; 1; 18	RBR; 2; 3	NÜR; 1; 3	NÜR; 2; 2	ZAN; 1; 6	ZAN; 2; 4	SAC; 1 Ret	SAC; 2; 15	HOC; 1; 4	**HOC**; **2** Ret			4th	117
2019	Mann-Filter Team HTP	Mercedes-AMG GT3	OSC; 1; 9	OSC; 2; 8	MST; 1; 5	MST; 2; 6	RBR; 1 Ret	RBR; 2; 2	ZAN; 1 Ret	ZAN; 2; 21	NÜR; 1; 6	NÜR; 2; 5	HOC; 1; 2	HOC; 2; 7	**SAC**; **1**; 1	SAC; 2; 5			**3rd**	**145**
2020	Mann-Filter Team HTP-Winward	Mercedes-AMG GT3 Evo	LAU; 1; 7	LAU; 2; 8	NÜR; 1; 26	NÜR; 2; 14	HOC; 1; 9	HOC; 2; 4	SAC; 1; 18	SAC; 2 Ret	RBR; 1; 13	RBR; 2; 16	LAU; 1; 2	LAU; 2; 5	OSC; 1; 10	OSC; 2; 9			9th	87
2022	Madpanda Motorsport	Mercedes-AMG GT3 Evo	OSC; 1	OSC; 2	RBR; 1	RBR; 2	ZAN; 1; 15	ZAN; 2; 12	NÜR; 1; 16	NÜR; 2; 5	LAU; 1	LAU; 2	SAC; 1	SAC; 2	HOC; 1	HOC; 2			30th	16
2023	Haupt Racing Team	Mercedes-AMG GT3 Evo	HOC; 1	HOC; 2	NOR; 1; 6	NOR; 2; 7	NÜR; 1	NÜR; 2	SAC; 1; 3	SAC; 2; 6^{2}	RBR; 1	RBR; 2	HOC; 1; 8	HOC; 2; 2					9th	75

=== Complete GT World Challenge Europe results ===
==== GT World Challenge Europe Endurance Cup ====
Year	Team	Car	Class	1	2	3	4	5	6	7	Pos.	Points
2013	HTP Motorsport	Mercedes-Benz SLS AMG GT3	Pro	MNZ	SIL	LEC	SPA; 6H; 4	SPA; 12H; 3	SPA; 24H; 1	NÜR; 1	2nd	71
2014	HTP Motorsport	Mercedes-Benz SLS AMG GT3	Pro	MNZ	SIL	LEC	SPA; 6H; 6	SPA; 12H; 6	SPA; 24H; 5	NÜR	19th	18
2016	AMG - Team HTP Motorsport	Mercedes-AMG GT3	Pro	MNZ	SIL	LEC	SPA; 6H; 22	SPA; 12H; 8	SPA; 24H; 5	NÜR	29th	12
2017	Black Falcon	Mercedes-AMG GT3	Pro-Am	MON	SIL	LEC	SPA; 6H; 14	SPA; 12H; 12	SPA; 24H; 12	CAT	8th	46
2018	Mercedes-AMG Team Strakka Racing	Mercedes-AMG GT3	Pro	MNZ; 2	SIL; 8	LEC; 9	SPA; 6H; 22	SPA; 12H; 12	SPA; 24H; 11	CAT; 17	19th	24
2019	Mercedes-AMG Team GruppeM Racing	Mercedes-AMG GT3	Pro	MNZ	SIL	LEC	SPA; 6H; 13	SPA; 12H; 2	SPA; 24H; 10	CAT	22nd	10
2021	HubAuto Racing	Mercedes-AMG GT3 Evo	Pro	MNZ	LEC	SPA; 6H; 12	SPA; 12H; 45	SPA; 24H; 37	NÜR	CAT	NC	0
2022	AMG Team GetSpeed	Mercedes-AMG GT3 Evo	Pro	IMO	LEC	SPA; 6H; 7	SPA; 12H; 10	SPA; 24H; 2^{3}	HOC	CAT	18th	22
2023	Mercedes-AMG Team Akkodis ASP	Mercedes-AMG GT3 Evo	Pro	MNZ; 13	LEC; 13	SPA; 6H; 15	SPA; 12H; 10	SPA; 24H; Ret	NÜR; Ret	CAT; 7	22nd	6
2024	Boutsen VDS	Mercedes-AMG GT3 Evo	Pro	LEC; 16	SPA; 6H; 2	SPA; 12H; 9	SPA; 24H; 18	NÜR; 7	MNZ; 6	JED; 12	12th	24
2025	Boutsen VDS	Mercedes-AMG GT3 Evo	Pro	LEC; 28	MNZ; Ret	SPA; 6H; 39	SPA; 12H; 65†	SPA; 24H; Ret^{3}	NÜR; 13	CAT; Ret	27th	1
2026	Mercedes-AMG Team GetSpeed	Mercedes-AMG GT3 Evo	Pro	LEC; 7	MNZ; Ret	SPA; 6H; 62†	SPA; 12H; 62†	SPA; 24H; Ret	NÜR; 5	ALG; 1	5th	41

==== GT World Challenge Europe Sprint Cup ====
Year	Team	Car	Class	1	2	3	4	5	6	7	8	9	10	11	12	13	14	Pos.	Points
2014	HTP Motorsport	Mercedes-Benz SLS AMG GT3	Pro	NOG; QR; 5	NOG; CR; 1	BRH; QR; 2	BRH; CR; 2	ZAN; QR; 2	ZAN; CR; 4	SVK; QR; 3	SVK; CR; 4	ALG; QR; 2	ALG; CR; 1	ZOL; QR; 6	ZOL; CR; 1	BAK; QR; 9	BAK; CR; Ret	1st	142
2022	AKKodis ASP Team	Mercedes-AMG GT3 Evo	Pro	BRH; 1	BRH; 2	MAG; 1; 10	MAG; 2; 2	ZAN; 1	ZAN; 2	MIS; 1	MIS; 2	VAL; 1	VAL; 2					12th	12.5
2024	Boutsen VDS	Mercedes-AMG GT3 Evo	Pro	BRH; 1 DNS	BRH; 2; 3	MIS; 1; 9	MIS; 2; 9	HOC; 1; 12	HOC; 2; 4	MAG; 1; 19	**MAG**; **2**; 3	CAT; 1; 1	CAT; 2; 5					7th	35.5

=== Complete Deutsche Tourenwagen Masters results ===
(key) (Races in bold indicate pole position) (Races in italics indicate fastest lap)

Year	Team	Car	1	2	3	4	5	6	7	8	9	10	11	12	13	14	15	16	17	18	Pos	Points
2015	Mücke Motorsport	Mercedes-AMG C-Coupé DTM	HOC; 1; 16	HOC; 2; 16	LAU; 1; 15	LAU; 2; 16	NOR; 1 Ret	NOR; 2 Ret	ZAN; 1; 15	ZAN; 2; 16	SPL; 1; 20	SPL; 2; 7	MSC; 1; 16	MSC; 2; 18	OSC; 1; 16	OSC; 2; 18	NÜR; 1; 5	NÜR; 2; 6	HOC; 1; 10	HOC; 2; 13	22nd	25
2016	Mercedes-Benz DTM Team HWA II	Mercedes-AMG C63 DTM	HOC; 1 Ret	HOC; 2; 12	SPL; 1; 15	SPL; 2; 22	LAU; 1; 16	LAU; 2 Ret	NOR; 1; 8	NOR; 2; 12	ZAN; 1 Ret	ZAN; 2 Ret	MSC; 1; 4	MSC; 2; 16	NÜR; 1; 10	NÜR; 2; 23	HUN; 1; 21	HUN; 2; 17	HOC; 1; 17	HOC; 2; 19	20th	17
2021	Mercedes-AMG Team HRT	Mercedes-AMG GT3 Evo	MNZ; 1; 2^{3}	MNZ; 2; 10	LAU; 1 Ret	LAU; 2; 1^{3}	ZOL; 1; 7^{2}	ZOL; 2; 2	NÜR; 1; 4	NÜR; 2; 4	RBR; 1; 2^{2}	RBR; 2; 3	ASS; 1; 4^{3}	ASS; 2; 6	HOC; 1; 5	HOC; 2; 3	NOR; 1; 1	NOR; 2; 1			1st	230
2022	Mercedes-AMG Team Winward	Mercedes-AMG GT3 Evo	ALG; 1; 11	ALG; 2; 5	LAU; 1; 10	LAU; 2; 15	IMO; 1; 20	IMO; 2; 9	NOR; 1; 6	NOR; 2; 6	NÜR; 1; 4	NÜR; 2; 5	SPA; 1; 2	SPA; 2; 15	RBR; 1; 9	RBR; 2; 20^{2}	HOC; 1; 15	HOC; 2 Ret			11th	74

=== Complete IMSA SportsCar Championship results ===
(key) (Races in bold indicate pole position; results in italics indicate fastest lap)

Year	Team	Class	Make	Engine	1	2	3	4	5	6	7	8	9	10	11	12	Pos.	Points
2022	Alegra Motorsports	GTD	Mercedes-AMG GT3 Evo	Mercedes-AMG M159 6.2 L V8	DAY; 20	SEB; 9	LBH	LGA	MDO	DET	WGL	MOS	LIM	ELK	VIR		46th	379
2022	WeatherTech Racing	GTD Pro	Mercedes-AMG GT3 Evo	Mercedes-AMG M159 6.2 L V8												PET; 6	29th	275
2023	Team Korthoff Motorsports	GTD	Mercedes-AMG GT3 Evo	Mercedes-AMG M159 6.2 L V8	DAY; 15	SEB	LBH	LGA	WGL	MOS	LIM	ELK	VIR	IMS	PET		59th	192
2024	Korthoff/Preston Motorsports	GTD	Mercedes-AMG GT3 Evo	Mercedes-AMG M159 6.2 L V8	DAY; 5	SEB	LBH	LGA	WGL	MOS	ELK	VIR	IMS	PET			52nd	273
2025	Korthoff Competition Motors	GTD	Mercedes-AMG GT3 Evo	Mercedes-AMG M159 6.2 L V8	DAY; 9	SEB; 18	LBH	LGA	WGL	MOS	ELK	VIR	IMS	PET			51st	392
2026	Bartone Bros with GetSpeed	GTD Pro	Mercedes-AMG GT3 Evo	Mercedes-AMG M159 6.2 L V8	DAY; 11	SEB	LGA	DET	WGL	MOS	ELK	VIR	IMS	PET			41st	225

=== Complete British GT Championship results ===
(key) (Races in bold indicate pole position) (Races in italics indicate fastest lap)

Year	Team	Car	Class	1	2	3	4	5	6	7	8	9	DC	Points
2024	2 Seas Motorsport	Mercedes-AMG GT3 Evo	GT3	OUL; 1; 13	OUL; 2; 10	**SIL**; **1**; 12	DON; 1; 7	**SPA**; **1**; 1	SNE; 1; 9	SNE; 2; 1	DON; 1; 12	BRH; 1 Ret	7th	75
2025	2 Seas Motorsport	Mercedes-AMG GT3 Evo	GT3	DON; 1; 3	SIL; 1; 13	OUL; 1; 2	**OUL**; **2**; 1	SPA; 1; 19	SNE; 1; 2	**SNE**; **2**; 1	**BRH**; **1**; 7	DON; 1; 3	3rd	141.5

Sporting positions
Preceded by Nico Rosberg	Formula BMW ADAC; Champion; 2003	Succeeded by Sebastian Vettel
Preceded by Dino Lunardi; Alexandros Margaritis	ADAC GT Masters; Champion; 2012; With: Sebastian Asch	Succeeded by Diego Alessi; Daniel Keilwitz
Preceded by Stéphane Ortelli; Laurens Vanthoor (FIA GT Series)	Blancpain Sprint Series; Champion; 2014	Succeeded by Maximilian Buhk; Vincent Abril
Preceded by René Rast	Deutsche Tourenwagen Masters; Champion; 2021	Succeeded by Sheldon van der Linde
