= Michael Devaney (racing driver) =

Irish racing driver

- Nationality: Irish
- Born: 29 November 1984 (age 41) Dublin, Ireland

Previous series
- 2007–08 2007 2005–07 2006 2004–2005 2002–2003: British Formula Three; Formula Three Euroseries; A1 Grand Prix; Porsche Carrera Cup UK; German Formula 3 Formula BMW ADAC

Michael Devaney (born 29 November 1984 in Dublin) is an Irish racing driver.

== Career overview ==
Devaney has been racing since 1997 when he had a successful stint in the Irish Junior Karting Championship winning the All-Ireland and National Championships. He moved into Irish Formula Ford Championship in 2001 at the age of 16, winning many races. He then moved on to German Formula BMW in 2002 and won in just his second race ahead of Nico Rosberg. Devaney moved up to German Formula 3 in 2004 and became Ireland's youngest ever Formula 3 race winner, in 2005 he fought for the championship and finished second overall despite missing the first two races due to lack of funding. He then became the driver for A1 Team Ireland in the A1 Grand Prix series for the 2006–07 season after some strong showings in 2005 while substituting for Ralph Firman.

After leaving his drive with Team Ireland, Devaney signed for newly formed Ultimate Motorsport to compete in the International British Formula 3 Championship with new Formula 3 constructor Mygale. He took the team's first two victories thanks to a double win at Snetterton. He is currently without a drive after Ultimate pulled out of British F3.

== Personal life ==
Devaney's father, Bernard Devaney (born 1953), was also a racing driver and competed in five European Formula Two races from 1979 to 1980.

== Awards ==
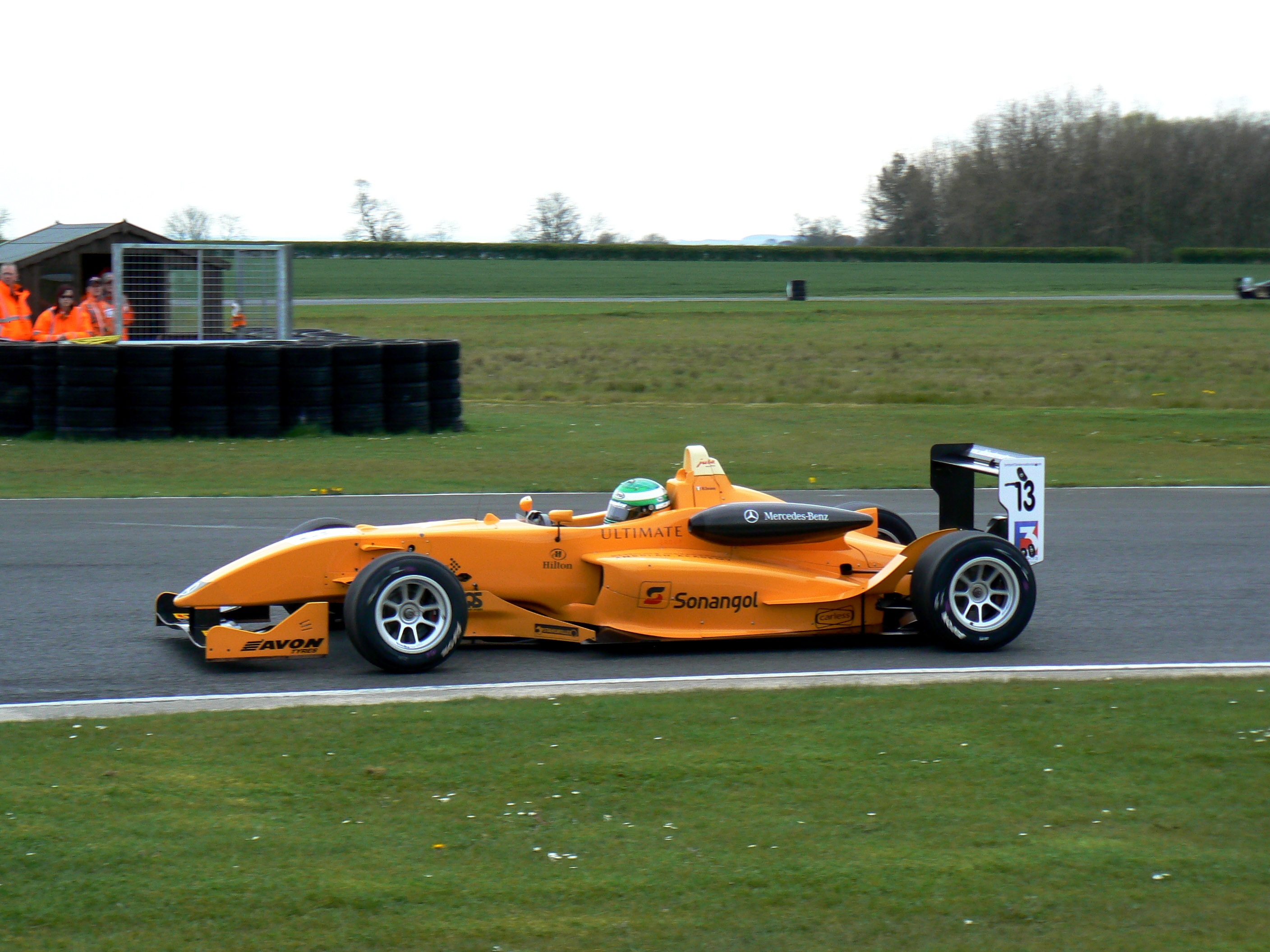
Devaney driving for Ultimate Motorsport at the Croft round of the 2008 British Formula Three season.

Michael Devaney has won the following awards during his short time in motorsport:

- Irish karting ‘Rookie of the Year’ 1997
- Motorsport Ireland Young Racing Driver of the Year 2001
- Motorsport Ireland Young Racing Driver of the Year 2002

He has also achieved:

- Winner of IRL Plate (1999)
- Irish National Junior Karting Champion (2000)
- 2 race wins in the Irish Formula Ford Zetec Championship (2001)
- 4 race wins total in German Formula BMW (2002 & 2003)
- 7 race wins total in the German F3 Championship (2004 & 2005)
- Runner-up in the 2005 German F3 Championship
- First ever victories for French constructor Mygale in Formula 3. (2008)
- First ever race car victory for Ultimate Motorsport(Snetterton, British F3(2008)

== Racing career ==
=== Complete A1 Grand Prix results ===
(key) (Races in bold indicate pole position) (Races in italics indicate fastest lap)

Year	Entrant	1	2	3	4	5	6	7	8	9	10	11	12	13	14	15	16	17	18	19	20	21	22	DC	Points
2005–06	Ireland	GBR; SPR; 10	GBR; FEA; Ret	GER; SPR	GER; FEA	POR; SPR	POR; FEA	AUS; SPR; 4	AUS; FEA; 14	MYS; SPR	MYS; FEA	UAE; SPR	UAE; FEA	RSA; SPR	RSA; FEA	IDN; SPR	IDN; FEA	MEX; SPR	MEX; FEA	USA; SPR	USA; FEA	CHN; SPR; 4	CHN; FEA; Ret	8th	68
2006–07	Ireland	NED; SPR; 15	NED; FEA; 14	CZE; SPR; 13	CZE; FEA; 13	BEI; SPR; 20	BEI; FEA; Ret	MYS; SPR; 14	MYS; FEA; 10	IDN; SPR	IDN; FEA	NZL; SPR	NZL; FEA	AUS; SPR	AUS; FEA	RSA; SPR	RSA; FEA	MEX; SPR	MEX; FEA	SHA; SPR	SHA; FEA	GBR; SPR	GBR; SPR	19th	8

=== Complete Formula 3 Euro Series record ===
(key)

Yr	Team	Chassis	Engine	1	2	3	4	5	6	7	8	9	10	11	12	13	14	15	16	17	18	19	20	Pos	Points
2007	Ultimate Motorsport	Mygale M07/001	Mercedes	HOC1; 1	HOC1; 2	BRH; 1	BRH; 2	NOR; 1	NOR; 2	MAG; 1; 18	MAG; 2; 16	MUG; 1	MUG; 2	ZAN; 1	ZAN; 2	NÜR; 1	NÜR; 2	CAT; 1	CAT; 2	NOG; 1	NOG; 2	HOC2; 1	HOC2; 2	NC	0
