= RC Motorsport =

Italian motorsport team

(Italy) RC Motorsport
- Founded: 1989; 37 years ago
- Folded: 2010; 16 years ago
- Team principal(s): Cristiano Giardina
- Former series: Formula 3 Euro Series; Formula Renault 3.5 Series; Italian Formula Three Championship; Eurocup Formula Renault 2.0
- Teams' Championships: 1992 Italian Formula Three; 1994 Italian Formula Three; 1996 Italian Formula Three; 1997 Italian Formula Three

RC Motorsport was an auto racing team based in Italy.

== Former series results ==
=== Formula 3 Euro Series ===
Formula 3 Euro Series
Year	Car	Drivers	Races	Wins	Poles	F/Laps	Points	D.C.	T.C.
2007	Dallara F306-Volkswagen	(Germany) Maximilian Götz [G]	8	0	0	0	0	NC†	NC
2007	Dallara F306-Volkswagen	(United States) Jonathan Summerton [G]	6	0	0	0	0	NC†	NC
2007	Dallara F306-Volkswagen	(Netherlands) Carlo van Dam [G]	2	0	0	0	0	NC†	NC
2008	Dallara F308-Volkswagen	(Germany) Maximilian Götz	8	0	0	0	3	22nd	8th
2008	Dallara F308-Volkswagen	(New Zealand) Brendon Hartley [G]	2	0	0	0	0	NC†	8th
2008	Dallara F308-Volkswagen	(United Kingdom) Martin Plowman	14	0	0	0	0	31st	8th
2008	Dallara F308-Volkswagen	(Germany) Peter Elkmann [G]	2	0	0	0	0	NC†	8th
2008	Dallara F308-Volkswagen	(France) Nelson Panciatici [G]	2	0	0	0	0	NC†	8th
2008	Dallara F308-Volkswagen	(Belgium) Frédéric Vervisch [G]	2	0	0	0	0	NC†	8th
2008	Dallara F308-Volkswagen	(Germany) Jens Klingmann	20	0	0	0	0	27th	8th
2008	Dallara F308-Volkswagen	(China) Cong Fu Cheng	16	0	0	0	0	29th	8th

† – Guest driver - ineligible for points.
