= 2001 Formula Renault 2000 Eurocup =

Motor racing competition

Seasons
- ← 2000 2002 →

The 2001 Formula Renault 2000 Eurocup season was the eleventh Eurocup Formula Renault 2.0 season. The season began at Monza Circuit on 30 March and finished at the Circuito do Estoril on 4 November, after ten races. RC Motorsport driver Augusto Farfus claimed the championship title, taking four victories at Monza, Brno, Magny-Cours and Hungaroring. Marc Benz won one race at Nürburgring. César Campaniço who missed Zolder and Spielberg rounds finished season on third place. Fourth-placed Ryan Briscoe scored two wins at the end of the season on Iberian circuits Jarama and Estoril. Other wins were scored by Bruno Spengler, Ronnie Quintarelli and Eric Salignon.

== Teams and drivers ==
2001 Entry List
Team	No.	Driver name	Rounds
(Germany) Lauderbach Motorsport	1	(Netherlands) Charles Zwolsman Jr.	1–3, 5–8, 10
(Germany) Lauderbach Motorsport	19	(Netherlands) Ross Zwolsman	1–2, 5–8, 10
(Austria) Walter Lechner Racing	2	(Germany) Marcel Lasée	1–2
(Austria) Walter Lechner Racing	3	(Germany) Jörg Hardt	1–2
(Italy) JD Motorsport	2	(Germany) Marcel Lasée	7–8, 10
(Italy) JD Motorsport	25	(Argentina) Christian Kissling	1–5, 10
(Italy) JD Motorsport	26	(Switzerland) Benjamin Leuenberger	1–8, 10
(Italy) JD Motorsport	64	(France) Jean de Pourtales	4
(Italy) JD Motorsport	71	(Argentina) Mariano Acebal	6
(Germany) Motopark Academy	3	(Germany) Jörg Hardt	8
(Germany) Motopark Academy	20	(Germany) Christopher Brück	1–2, 7–8
(Germany) Motopark Academy	46	(Austria) Andreas Zuber	1–2, 7–8
(Germany) Lohmann Motorsport	4	(Italy) Thomas Pichler	1–7, 10
(Italy) Cram Competition	5	(Italy) Ronnie Quintarelli	1–5
(Italy) Cram Competition	21	(Brazil) Paulo Bueno	1–5
(Italy) Cram Competition	31	(Italy) Fausto Ippoliti	1–7
(Italy) Cram Competition	43	(Italy) Alessandro Vitacolonna	1–6
(Italy) Cram Competition	63	(United States) Sean Murphey	7–9
(Italy) Cram Competition	69	(Italy) Marco Bonanomi	7–10
(Italy) Cram Competition	86	(Belgium) Jérôme Thiry	8
(France) Graff Racing	6	(France) Eric Salignon	1, 3–4, 6–8, 10
(France) Graff Racing	11	(Russia) Roman Rusinov	1, 3, 6, 10
(France) Graff Racing	42	(Canada) Bruno Spengler	1, 3–4, 6–8, 10
(France) Graff Racing	48	(France) Julien Pressac	3, 10
(France) Graff Racing	92	(France) Philippe Almeras	10
(Croatia) Team Colak	7	(Croatia) Marin Colak	1–6
(Italy) RC Motorsport	8	(Brazil) Augusto Farfus	All
(Italy) RC Motorsport	36	(Poland) Robert Kubica	All
(Italy) RC Motorsport	39	(Italy) Mauro Massironi	All
(Belgium) Johns Racing Team	9	(Belgium) John Svensson	All
(Germany) SL Formula Racing	10	(Germany) Marco Knauf	1–2, 6, 8, 10
(Germany) SL Formula Racing	28	(Germany) Fabian Denner	1–2, 6–8
(Germany) SL Formula Racing	33	(Germany) Philipp Jenig	1–2, 8, 10
(Germany) SL Formula Racing	65	(Germany) Tobias Maisch	7
(Germany) SL Formula Racing	70	(Finland) Antti Katajakunnas	6, 8, 10
Belgium Racing Service	12	(Belgium) Matthieu Lesenne	1–2, 5
(Switzerland) Jenzer Motorsport	14	(Switzerland) Marc Benz	All
(Switzerland) Jenzer Motorsport	40	(Italy) Giorgio Mondini	All
(Switzerland) Jenzer Motorsport	47	(Germany) Olaf Schmidt	1–2
(Switzerland) Jenzer Motorsport	62	(Italy) Paolo Mondini	1–3
(Switzerland) Jenzer Motorsport	72	(Switzerland) Ken Allemann	6, 10
(Switzerland) Jenzer Motorsport	75	(Switzerland) Manuel Benz	7–9
(Italy) Prema Powerteam	15	(Australia) Ryan Briscoe	1–3, 6, 9–10
(Italy) Prema Powerteam	22	(Portugal) César Campaniço	1–4, 6, 8–10
(France) TCS	16	(France) Emmanuel Piget	1–6, 8
(France) TCS	44	(France) Julien Piguet	All
(Italy) Lucidi Motorsport	18	(Argentina) Mariano Altuna	All
(Italy) Lucidi Motorsport	32	(Argentina) Esteban Guerrieri	All
(Italy) Lucidi Motorsport	37	(Argentina) José María López	All
(Italy) ADM Junior Team	23	(Brazil) Fabio Carbone	1–4, 6, 10
(Italy) ADM Junior Team	66	(Brazil) Andre Grillo	1–4
(Italy) DG Racing	27	(Switzerland) Neel Jani	All
(Italy) DG Racing	35	(Hong Kong) Jim Ka To	1–2
(Italy) DG Racing	45	(Switzerland) Steve Zacchia	All
(Italy) DG Racing	61	(Cuba) Rafael Ferrer	3–9
(Italy) DG Racing	76	(France) Jean-Christophe Ravier	7
(Italy) DG Racing	84	(France) Joel Stere	9
(Republic of Ireland) Dempsey Racing	12	(Republic of Ireland) Keith Dempsey	1–5
(Italy) Facondini Racing	30	(Italy) Davide di Benedetto	1–4, 6, 9–10
(Italy) Facondini Racing	38	(Italy) Michele Maceratesi	1–4, 6
(Denmark) Team Formula Sport	41	(Denmark) Robert Schlünssen	2, 5–8, 10
(France) Ren Car Competition	49	(Japan) Yasutaka Hamada	3, 6
(United Kingdom) Manor Motorsport	53	(United States) Richard Antinucci	3–4
(United Kingdom) Manor Motorsport	54	(Canada) James Eaton	3–4
Team Renault Sweden	55	(Sweden) Patrick Ernston	2–8
Team Renault Sweden	56	(Sweden) Mikael Karlsson	2–8
(Germany) Kug Motorsport	59	(Belgium) Dennis van Lammern	6, 8, 10
(United Kingdom) Paston Racing	67	(United Kingdom) Stefan Hodgetts	4
(Belgium) Signa Screen	68	(Belgium) Patrick Chaillet	5
(France) Tech 1 Racing	73	(France) Nicolas Lapierre	7, 10
(France) Tech 1 Racing	74	(France) Julien Gilbert	10
(France) Tech 1 Racing	90	(Monaco) Gregory Breuer	10
(Germany) Eiffelland Racing	77	(Czech Republic) Jaroslav Janiš	2–3, 5–6
(Germany) GM Motorsport	79	(Netherlands) Jos Menten	8
(Germany) GM Motorsport	80	(Germany) Maik Heupel	8
(Germany) GM Motorsport	81	(Italy) Vitantonio Liuzzi	8
(Denmark) Den Blå Avis	82	(Luxembourg) Tom Keller	8
(Denmark) Den Blå Avis	83	(Denmark) Philip Andersen	8
(Belgium) Franchi	93	(Belgium) Gregory Franchi	10

== Calendar ==
Round	Circuit	Date	Pole position	Fastest lap	Winning driver	Winning team
1	(Italy) Monza Circuit	30 March	(France) Eric Salignon	(Argentina) José María López	(Brazil) Augusto Farfus	(Italy) RC Motorsport
2	(Czech Republic) Masaryk Circuit, Brno	14 April	(Italy) Ronnie Quintarelli	(Italy) Ronnie Quintarelli	(Brazil) Augusto Farfus	(Italy) RC Motorsport
3	(France) Circuit de Nevers Magny-Cours	29 April	(France) Julien Pressac	(Australia) Ryan Briscoe	(Canada) Bruno Spengler	(France) Graff Racing
4	(United Kingdom) Silverstone Circuit	5 May	(Brazil) Augusto Farfus	(Brazil) Augusto Farfus	(Brazil) Augusto Farfus	(Italy) RC Motorsport
5	(Belgium) Circuit Zolder	18 May	(Brazil) Augusto Farfus	(Italy) Ronnie Quintarelli	(Italy) Ronnie Quintarelli	(Italy) Cram Competition
6	(Hungary) Hungaroring	29 July	(Brazil) Augusto Farfus	(Portugal) César Campaniço	(Brazil) Augusto Farfus	(Italy) RC Motorsport
7	(Austria) A1 Ring, Spielberg	24 August	(Poland) Robert Kubica	(France) Eric Salignon	(France) Eric Salignon	(France) Graff Racing
8	(Germany) Nürburgring	8 September	(Argentina) José María López	(Switzerland) Marc Benz	(Switzerland) Marc Benz	(Switzerland) Jenzer Motorsport
9	(Spain) Circuito del Jarama, Madrid	28 September	(Portugal) César Campaniço	(Portugal) César Campaniço	(Australia) Ryan Briscoe	(Italy) Prema Powerteam
10	(Portugal) Circuito do Estoril	4 November	(Australia) Ryan Briscoe	(Australia) Ryan Briscoe	(Australia) Ryan Briscoe	(Italy) Prema Powerteam

== Championship standings ==
=== Drivers ===
Points are awarded to the drivers as follows:

Position	1	2	3	4	5	6	7	8	9	10	PP	FL
Points	30	24	20	16	12	10	8	6	4	2	2	2

Pos	Driver	MNZ (Italy)	BRN (Czech Republic)	MAG (France)	SIL (United Kingdom)	ZOL (Belgium)	HUN (Hungary)	A1R (Austria)	NÜR (Germany)	JAR (Spain)	EST (Portugal)	Points
Pos	Driver	1	2	3	4	5	6	7	8	9	10	Points
1	(Brazil) Augusto Farfus	1	1	Ret	**1**	**Ret**	**1**	Ret	6	8	4	160
2	(Switzerland) Marc Benz	6	6	5	8	4	7	4	1	3	Ret	130
3	(Portugal) César Campaniço	17	2	8	5		2		8	**2**	3	122
4	(Australia) Ryan Briscoe	Ret	19	3			4			1	**1**	102
5	(France) Eric Salignon	**3**		12	3		16	1	4		5	102
6	(Brazil) Fabio Carbone	4	26	6	2		3				14	70
7	(Italy) Ronnie Quintarelli	26	**3**	13	6	1						66
8	(Netherlands) Charles Zwolsman	16	18	20		6	5	3	2		12	66
9	(Canada) Bruno Spengler	8		1	7		30	6	10		11	56
10	(Argentina) Esteban Guerrieri	5	5	Ret	9	2	Ret	Ret	Ret	10	Ret	54
11	(Germany) Marcel Lasée	7	12					2	5		7	52
12	(France) Julien Piguet	Ret	11	28	18	3	34	5	7	5	20	52
13	(Italy) Thomas Pichler	2	8	4	Ret	11	17	Ret			Ret	46
14	(Poland) Robert Kubica	Ret	Ret	15	21	Ret	6	**Ret**	12	6	2	46
15	(United States) Richard Antinucci			2	4							40
16	(Switzerland) Benjamin Leuenberger	15	28	Ret	23	7	11	7	3		Ret	36
17	(Argentina) José María López	11	23	24	Ret	Ret	10	11	**24**	7	6	24
18	(Italy) Alessandro Vitacolonna	Ret	4	14	Ret	Ret	8					22
19	(Italy) Davide di Benedetto	DNQ	9	18	16		29			4	10	22
20	(Argentina) Mariano Altuna	Ret	15	17	20	5	12	8	32	12	17	18
21	(France) Julien Pressac			**7**							18	10
22	(Italy) Fausto Ippoliti	Ret	Ret	26	28	8	9	DNS				10
23	(Germany) Jörg Hardt	Ret	7						Ret			8
24	(Switzerland) Neel Jani	14	25	Ret	10	12	23	Ret	30	Ret	8	8
25	(Czech Republic) Jaroslav Janiš		13	9		9	20					8
26	(Italy) Giorgio Mondini	Ret	22	21	13	Ret	14	Ret	Ret	9	13	4
27	(France) Nicolas Lapierre							9			15	4
28	(Croatia) Marin Colak	9	Ret	DNQ	17	18	28					4
29	(Germany) Maik Heupel								9			4
30	(France) Philippe Almeras										9	4
31	(Netherlands) Ross Zwolsman	Ret	20			10	21	13	DNS		16	2
32	(Argentina) Christian Kissling	10	Ret	Ret	22	13					Ret	2
33	(Belgium) John Svensson	DNS	30	10	24	14	31	16	14	Ret	24	2
34	(Italy) Mauro Massironi	DNQ	21	23	Ret	16	Ret	10	15	Ret	19	2
35	(Germany) Fabian Denner	19	10				Ret	Ret	Ret			2
36	(France) Emmanuel Piget	24	Ret	11	11	Ret	18		17			0
37	(Denmark) Robert Schlünssen		DNQ			Ret	22	18	11		21	0
38	(Cuba) Rafael Ferrer			Ret	27	20	24	DNS	31	11		0
39	(Brazil) Paulo Bueno	12	16	DNQ	14	Ret						0
40	(United Kingdom) Stefan Hodgetts				12							0
41	(France) Jean-Christophe Ravier							12				0
42	(Russia) Roman Rusinov	13		16			Ret				25	0
43	(Italy) Marco Bonanomi							DNS	26	13	Ret	0
44	(Argentina) Mariano Acebal						13					0
45	(Belgium) Jérôme Thiry								13			0
46	(Germany) Christopher Brück	22	14					14	Ret			0
47	(France) Joël Stere									14		0
48	(Republic of Ireland) Keith Dempsey	23	27	Ret	15	15						0
49	(Switzerland) Steve Zacchia	DNQ	DNQ	25	Ret	19	33	Ret	33	15	Ret	0
50	(Sweden) Patrik Ernstson		DNQ	DNQ	Ret	21	27	15	27			0
51	(Switzerland) Ken Allemann						15				26	0
52	(Germany) Marco Knauf	DNQ	17				19		16		23	0
53	(Sweden) Mikael Karlsson		DNQ	19	25	17	Ret	Ret	21			0
54	(Austria) Andreas Zuber	Ret	Ret					17	20			0
55	(Brazil) Andre Grillo	18	Ret	27	19							0
56	(Italy) Vitantonio Liuzzi								18			0
57	(United States) Sean Murphey							19	19	Ret		0
58	(Italy) Michele Maceratesi	20	29	DNQ	29		32					0
59	(Hong Kong) Jim Ka To	21	DNQ									0
60	(Canada) James Eaton			22	26							0
61	(Italy) Paolo Mondini	Ret	22	Ret								0
62	(Belgium) Patrick Chaillet					22						0
63	(Netherlands) Jos Menten								22			0
64	(Monaco) Gregory Breuer										22	0
65	(Switzerland) Manuel Benz							Ret	23	Ret		0
66	(Germany) Philipp Jenig	DNQ	24						28		30	0
67	(Belgium) Matthieu Lesenne	25	Ret			Ret						0
68	(Japan) Yasutaka Hamada			Ret			25					0
69	(Denmark) Philip Andersen								25			0
70	(Belgium) Dennis van Lammern						26		Ret		29	0
71	(Finland) Antti Katajakunnas						Ret		34		27	0
72	(Belgium) Gregory Franchi										28	0
73	(Luxembourg) Tom Keller								29			0
74	(France) Jean de Pourtales				30							0
	(Germany) Tobias Maisch							Ret				0
	(France) Julien Gilbert										Ret	0
	(Germany) Olaf Schmidt	DNQ	DNQ									0
Pos	Driver	MNZ (Italy)	BRN (Czech Republic)	MAG (France)	SIL (United Kingdom)	ZOL (Belgium)	HUN (Hungary)	A1R (Austria)	NÜR (Germany)	JAR (Spain)	EST (Portugal)	Points

Colour	Result
Gold	Winner
Silver	Second place
Bronze	Third place
Green	Points classification
Blue	Non-points classification
Blue	Non-classified finish (NC)
Purple	Retired, not classified (Ret)
Red	Did not qualify (DNQ)
Red	Did not pre-qualify (DNPQ)
Black	Disqualified (DSQ)
White	Did not start (DNS)
White	Withdrew (WD)
White	Race cancelled (C)
Blank	Did not practice (DNP)
Blank	Did not arrive (DNA)
Blank	Excluded (EX)

**Bold** – Pole
Italics – Fastest Lap

=== Teams ===
Pos	Team	Points
1	(Italy) Prema Powerteam	224
2	(Italy) RC Motorsport	204
3	(France) Graff Racing	172
4	(Switzerland) Jenzer Motorsport	134
5	(Italy) Cram Competition	98
6	(Italy) Lucidi Motorsport	96
7	(Italy) JD Motorsport	82
8	(Italy) ADM Junior Team	70
9	(Germany) Lauderbach Motorsport	68
10	(France) TCS	52
11	(Germany) Lohmann Motorsport	46
12	(United Kingdom) Manor Motorsport	40
13	(Italy) Facondini Racing	22
14	(Austria) Walter Lechner Racing	16
15	(Italy) DG Racing	8
16	(Germany) Eiffelland Racing	8
17	(France) Tech 1 Racing	4
18	(Germany) GM Motorsport	4
19	(Croatia) Team Colak	4
20	(Belgium) Johns Racing Team	2
21	(Germany) SL Formula Racing	2
