= 2002 Formula Renault 2000 Eurocup =

Motor racing competition

Seasons
- ← 2001 2003 →

The 2002 Formula Renault 2000 Eurocup season was the twelfth Eurocup Formula Renault 2.0 season. The season began at Circuit de Nevers Magny-Cours on 20 April and finished at the Circuito do Estoril on 19 October, after nine races.

Series veteran Éric Salignon scored four victories at Magny-Cours, Silverstone, Oschersleben and Imola during the season, he took the championship at the wheel of his Graff Racing-run car, giving team their first Eurocup championship. Swiss driver Neel Jani who competed with Jenzer Motorsport was the only Salignon's rival championship title was not resolved until the final round, and Jani finished in series' standings just four points behind French driver, winning races at Anderstorp, Circuit de Spa-Francorchamps and Circuito do Estoril. Salignon's teammate Nicolas Lapierre improved to third place. Cram Competition's José María López won at Jarama on way to his fourth place. Lewis Hamilton completed the top five, competing just four of the nine races, taking his first Eurocup win in the home Donington Park race.

== Teams and drivers ==
2002 Entry List
Team	No.	Driver name	Rounds
(France) Graff Racing	1	(France) Eric Salignon	All
(France) Graff Racing	11	(Switzerland) Frederic Barth	All
(France) Graff Racing	12	(France) Nicolas Lapierre	1–8
(France) Graff Racing	21	(France) Bruce Lorgeré-Roux	1–3
(France) Graff Racing	68	(France) Julien Joulian Falcini	6
(Italy) Drumel Motorsport	2	(Italy) Davide di Benedetto	1–2, 5–7
(Italy) Drumel Motorsport	34	(San Marino) Christian Montanari	1–2, 5–7
(Croatia) Colak Team	3	(Croatia) Marin Colak	1–2
(Belgium) Johns Racing Team	4	(Belgium) John Svensson	1–7, 9
(Belgium) Johns Racing Team	27	(Belgium) Paul Henry Fastre	1–5
(Belgium) Johns Racing Team	73	(Belgium) Jeremy Izzarelli	6
(Belgium) Johns Racing Team	75	(Belgium) Jürgen van Hover	6
(Germany) MA-con Racing	5	(Netherlands) Ross Zwolsman	1–2
(Germany) MA-con Racing	32	(Austria) Hannes Lachinger	All
(Germany) MA-con Racing	49	(Brazil) Andre Nicastro	4–5
(Germany) MA-con Racing	78	(Netherlands) Jos Menten	6–7
(Germany) MA-con Racing	82	(Greece) Alexandros Margaritis	8–9
(Italy) RP Motorsport	6	(Italy) Marco Bonanomi	1–2, 6–7
(Italy) RP Motorsport	71	(Italy) Giovanni Berton	6
(Italy) RP Motorsport	??	(Finland) Toni Vilander	7
(Italy) RC Motorsport	7	(Poland) Robert Kubica	1–7, 9
(Italy) RC Motorsport	37	(Brazil) Carlos Pereira	1–5, 7, 9
(Italy) RC Motorsport	72	(Brazil) Fernando Rees	6–7, 9
(Italy) RC Motorsport	74	(Brazil) Paulo Bueno	1–2
(Italy) ADM Junior Team	8	(Belgium) Gregory Franchi	1–7, 9
(Italy) ADM Junior Team	22	(Belgium) Dennis van Lammern	1–3
(Italy) ADM Junior Team	86	(Brazil) Marcello Thomaz	10
(United States) EuroInternational	9	(United States) John C. Antonio	3–9
(France) ASM	10	(Portugal) Nicolas Armindo	1–3, 6
(France) ASM	20	(Belgium) Mike den Tandt	1–4, 6–7
(France) ASM	57	(France) Alexandre Prémat	1–3, 6
(France) ASM	77	(France) Simon Pagenaud	6
(Italy) Cram Competition	14	(Portugal) Lourenco da Veiga	All
(Italy) Cram Competition	35	(France) Damien Pasini	All
(Italy) Cram Competition	43	(Brazil) Roberto Streit	All
(Italy) Cram Competition	58	(Argentina) José María López	3–7, 9
(France) TCS	16	(France) Emmanuel Piget	1–2
(France) TCS	44	(France) Julien Piguet	1–2
(Switzerland) Jenzer Motorsport	17	(Canada) Bruno Spengler	1–3, 5–9
(Switzerland) Jenzer Motorsport	18	(Switzerland) Neel Jani	All
(Switzerland) Jenzer Motorsport	19	(Italy) Giorgio Mondini	All
(Switzerland) Jenzer Motorsport	47	(Argentina) Esteban Guerrieri	4–6
(Switzerland) Jenzer Motorsport	51	(Sweden) Richard Göransson	4
(Germany) SL Formula Racing	23	(Germany) Hendrick Vieth	All
(Germany) SL Formula Racing	87	(Poland) Damian Sawicki	9
(Italy) JD Motorsport	24	(Austria) Christian Klien	All
(Italy) JD Motorsport	25	(Denmark) Robert Schlünssen	All
(Germany) FH Racing Team	28	(Germany) Andreas Feichtner	1–2, 5–7
(Greece) Margaritis Racing	30	(Germany) Dennis Furchheim	10
(Italy) Durango	33	(Italy) Ferdinando Monfardini	All
(Italy) Durango	39	(South Africa) Stephen Simpson	All
(Italy) Facondini Racing	36	(Netherlands) Nicky Pastorelli	All
(Italy) Facondini Racing	54	(Brazil) Rodrigo Bernardes	1–5
(Italy) Prema Powerteam	40	(France) Franck Perera	1–4, 6–7, 9
(Italy) Prema Powerteam	42	(Sweden) Alexander Storckenfeldt	1–4, 6–7, 9
(United Kingdom) TS2	41	(United Kingdom) Adam Smith	1–2
(United Kingdom) TS2	55	(United Kingdom) Martyn Smith	1–2
(Germany) Lohmann Motorsport	45	(Germany) Thomas Westarp	All
(Germany) KUG Motorsport	48	(Italy) Giacomo Ricci	4–9
(Germany) Motopark Oschersleben	52	(Austria) Andreas Zuber	5
(Denmark) Den Blå Avis	56	(Luxembourg) Tom Keller	All
(Denmark) Den Blå Avis	57	(Denmark) Philip Andersen	All
(United Kingdom) Fortec Motorsport	59	(United Kingdom) Danny Watts	6
(United Kingdom) Fortec Motorsport	60	(United Kingdom) Jamie Green	6
(United Kingdom) Fortec Motorsport	85	(Sweden) Robin Rudholm	8
(United Kingdom) Fortec Motorsport	86	(United Kingdom) Ryan Sharp	8
(Japan) Rod Blow	61	(Japan) Hayanari Shimoda	6
(France) Pole Racing Service	63	(France) David Laisis	6
(France) Pole Racing Service	64	(France) Yann Clairay	6–7
(France) Pole Racing Service	65	(France) Guillaume Moreau	6
(United Kingdom) Manor Motorsport	69	(United Kingdom) Lewis Hamilton	6–9
(United Kingdom) Manor Motorsport	70	(Venezuela) Ernesto Viso	6–7
(Italy) BVM Minardi Junior	76	(Italy) Giacomo Piccini	6
(Netherlands) AR Motorsport	83	(Netherlands) Ferdinand Kool	8
(Netherlands) AR Motorsport	84	(United Kingdom) Charles Hall	8
(Italy) Tomcat Racing	??	(Netherlands) Olivier Tielemans	7

== Calendar ==
Round	Circuit	Date	Pole position	Fastest lap	Winning driver	Winning team
1	(France) Circuit de Nevers Magny-Cours	20 April	(Poland) Robert Kubica	(France) Eric Salignon	(France) Eric Salignon	(France) Graff Racing
2	(United Kingdom) Silverstone Circuit	4 May	(France) Nicolas Lapierre	(France) Eric Salignon	(France) Eric Salignon	(France) Graff Racing
3	(Spain) Circuito del Jarama	1 June	(France) Eric Salignon	(France) Nicolas Lapierre	(Argentina) José María López	(Italy) Cram Competition
4	(Sweden) Scandinavian Raceway	29 June	(Switzerland) Neel Jani	(Switzerland) Neel Jani	(Switzerland) Neel Jani	(Switzerland) Jenzer Motorsport
5	(Germany) Motorsport Arena Oschersleben	13 July	(France) Eric Salignon	(France) Nicolas Lapierre	(France) Eric Salignon	(France) Graff Racing
6	(Belgium) Circuit de Spa-Francorchamps	3 August	(Switzerland) Neel Jani	(Austria) Hannes Lachinger	(Switzerland) Neel Jani	(Switzerland) Jenzer Motorsport
7	(Italy) Autodromo Enzo e Dino Ferrari, Imola	31 August	(Argentina) José María López	(United Kingdom) Lewis Hamilton	(France) Eric Salignon	(France) Graff Racing
8	(United Kingdom) Donington Park	5 October	(United Kingdom) Lewis Hamilton	(United Kingdom) Lewis Hamilton	(United Kingdom) Lewis Hamilton	(United Kingdom) Manor Motorsport
9	(Portugal) Circuito do Estoril	19 October	(Switzerland) Neel Jani	(Switzerland) Neel Jani	(Switzerland) Neel Jani	(Switzerland) Jenzer Motorsport

== Championship standings ==
=== Drivers ===
Points are awarded to the drivers as follows:

Position	1	2	3	4	5	6	7	8	9	10	PP	FL
Points	30	24	20	16	12	10	8	6	4	2	2	2

Pos	Driver	MAG (France)	SIL (United Kingdom)	JAR (Spain)	AND (Sweden)	OSC (Germany)	SPA (Belgium)	IMO (Italy)	DON (United Kingdom)	EST (Portugal)	Points
Pos	Driver	1	2	3	4	5	6	7	8	9	Points
1	(France) Éric Salignon	1	1	**3**	5	**1**	5	1	9	8	182
2	(Switzerland) Neel Jani	8	3	10	**1**	2	**1**	6	4	**1**	178
3	(France) Nicolas Lapierre	5	**2**	2	9	7	6	3	5		120
4	(Argentina) José María López			1	7	4	2	**Ret**		3	100
5	(United Kingdom) Lewis Hamilton						7	2	**1**	2	92
6	(Austria) Christian Klien	4	Ret	9	4	5	DNS	5	2	7	92
7	(Poland) Robert Kubica	**2**	4	13	3	10	Ret	27		4	80
8	(Canada) Bruno Spengler	6	6	7		3	10	7	Ret	6	68
9	(Brazil) Roberto Streit	10	5	Ret	2	14	Ret	26	3	13	58
10	(France) Alexandre Prémat	3	Ret	4			Ret				36
11	(Belgium) Mike den Tandt	7	10	11	23		3	Ret			30
12	(Denmark) Robert Schlünssen	17	7	5	11	8	Ret	12	21	28	26
13	(France) Franck Perera	31	15	8	8		13	Ret		5	24
14	(Austria) Hannes Lachinger	23	Ret	12	Ret	12	4	10	16	17	20
15	(Germany) Hendrick Vieth	Ret	13	19	21	6	16	22	7	Ret	18
16	(Italy) Davide di Benedetto	34	11			Ret	Ret	4			16
17	(Italy) Giorgio Mondini	25	26	Ret	6	19	20	11	13	10	12
18	(Luxembourg) Tom Keller	30	14	6	Ret	21	DNS	24	23	Ret	10
19	(United Kingdom) Charles Hall								6		10
20	(Portugal) Nicolas Armindo	9	8	16			25				10
21	(Brazil) Carlos Pereira	16	9	24	Ret	13		8		20	10
22	(San Marino) Christian Montanari	19	Ret			Ret	8	9			10
23	(France) Damien Pasini	27	16	Ret	16	Ret	15	19	8	Ret	6
24	(Germany) Andreas Feichtner	28	25			9	Ret	Ret			4
25	(France) Simon Pagenaud						9				4
26	(Germany) Dennis Furchheim									9	4
27	(Portugal) Lourenco da Veiga	33	19	14	Ret	16	19	15	10	12	2
28	(Argentina) Esteban Guerrieri				10	11	DNS				2
	(South Africa) Stephen Simpson	32	Ret	22	17	22	11	16	15	Ret	0
	(Sweden) Alexander Storckenfeldt	24	20	17	12		DNS	14		11	0
	(Italy) Marco Bonanomi	11	?				Ret	13			0
	(Greece) Alexandros Margaritis								11	19	0
	(Italy) Ferdinando Monfardini	14	12	26	13	25	12	20	17	16	0
	(Denmark) Philip Andersen	18	23	Ret	Ret	15	14	Ret	12	27	0
	(France) Julien Piguet	12	17								0
	(Netherlands) Ross Zwolsman	13	?								0
	(Netherlands) Nicky Pastorelli	36	Ret	Ret	Ret	17	Ret	Ret	14	14	0
	(Sweden) Richard Göransson				14						0
	(Brazil) Rodrigo Bernardes	35	21	15	15	24					0
	(Brazil) Fernando Rees						Ret	28		15	0
	(Brazil) Paulo Bueno	15	22								0
	(Germany) Thomas Westarp	?	Ret	20	Ret	23	17	Ret	24	22	0
	(Netherlands) Jos Menten						30	17			0
	(Italy) Giacomo Ricci				18	26	24	18	19	24	0
	(Switzerland) Frederic Barth	21	Ret	21	Ret	20	21	Ret	20	18	0
	(Belgium) Gregory Franchi	22	18	Ret	Ret	28	DNS	Ret		DNS	0
	(Belgium) John Svensson	?	24	18	19	27	28	21		25	0
	(Brazil) Andre Nicastro				Ret	18					0
	(Venezuela) Ernesto Viso						18	Ret			0
	(Netherlands) Ferdinand Kool								18		0
	(Belgium) Paul Henry Fastre	?	28	23	20	29					0
	(France) Emmanuel Piget	20	30								0
	(United States) John C. Antonio			25	22	Ret	DNS	Ret	Ret	21	0
	(Italy) Giovanni Berton						22				0
	(Sweden) Robin Rudholm								22		0
	(France) Yann Clairay						27	23			0
	(Italy) Giacomo Piccini						23				0
	(Poland) Damian Sawicki									23	0
	(Netherlands) Olivier Tielemans							25			0
	(France) Bruce Lorgeré-Roux	26	?	Ret							0
	(France) Guillaume Moreau						26				0
	(Brazil) Marcello Thomaz									26	0
	(United Kingdom) Martyn Smith	?	27								0
	(Belgium) Dennis van Lammern	29	29	Ret							0
	(France) Julien Joulian Falcini						29				0
	(Finland) Toni Vilander							29			0
	(Belgium) Jürgen van Hover						31				0
	(United Kingdom) Adam Smith	?	Ret								0
	(Austria) Andreas Zuber					Ret					0
	(United Kingdom) Jamie Green						Ret				0
	(France) David Laisis						Ret				0
	(Japan) Hayanari Shimoda						Ret				0
	(United Kingdom) Danny Watts						Ret				0
	(United Kingdom) Ryan Sharp								Ret		0
	(Belgium) Jeremy Izzarelli						DNS				0
	(Croatia) Marin Colak	?	?								0
Pos	Driver	MAG (France)	SIL (United Kingdom)	JAR (Spain)	AND (Sweden)	OSC (Germany)	SPA (Belgium)	IMO (Italy)	DON (United Kingdom)	EST (Portugal)	Points

Colour	Result
Gold	Winner
Silver	Second place
Bronze	Third place
Green	Points classification
Blue	Non-points classification
Blue	Non-classified finish (NC)
Purple	Retired, not classified (Ret)
Red	Did not qualify (DNQ)
Red	Did not pre-qualify (DNPQ)
Black	Disqualified (DSQ)
White	Did not start (DNS)
White	Withdrew (WD)
White	Race cancelled (C)
Blank	Did not practice (DNP)
Blank	Did not arrive (DNA)
Blank	Excluded (EX)

**Bold** – Pole
Italics – Fastest Lap

=== Teams ===
Pos	Team	Points
1	(France) Graff Racing	302
2	(Switzerland) Jenzer Motorsport	260
3	(Italy) Cram Competition	164
4	(Italy) JD Motorsport	118
5	(United Kingdom) Manor Motorsport	92
6	(Italy) RC Motorsport	90
7	(France) ASM	80
8	(Italy) Drumel Motorsport	26
9	(Italy) Prema Powerteam	24
10	(Germany) MA-con Racing	20
11	(Germany) SL Formula Racing	18
12	(Netherlands) AR Motorsport	10
13	(Denmark) Den Blå Avis	10
14	(Germany) FH Racing Team	4
15	(Greece) Margaritis Racing	4
