= 2003 Italian Formula Three Championship =

Seasons
- ← 2002 2004 →

The 2003 Italian Formula Three Championship was the 39th Italian Formula Three Championship season. It began on 30 March at Misano and ended on 12 October at Vallelunga after nine races.

Fausto Ippoliti of Target Racing won races at Binetto, Magione and scored another two podiums to ultimately clinch the title. He finished three points clear of Coloni Motorsport driver Christian Montanari, who won a race at Mugello and the season-ending races at Monza and Vallelunga. Third place went to Lucidi Motors driver Gregory Franchi, who finished ahead of Imola winner Marco Bonanomi.

== Teams and drivers ==
Entry List
Team	No	Driver	Chassis	Engine	Rounds
(Italy) Target Racing	2	(Italy) Fausto Ippoliti	Dallara F302	Spiess-Opel	All
(Italy) Target Racing	3	(Italy) Omar Galeffi	Dallara F302	Spiess-Opel	All
(Italy) Azeta Racing	4	(Italy) Giorgio Sernagiotto	Dallara F302	Spiess-Opel	1–4
(Italy) Azeta Racing	5	(Italy) Gianmaria Gabbiani	Dallara F399	Spiess-Opel	6, 8
(Italy) W.R.C. / RP Motorsport	8	(Italy) Giovanni Berton	Dallara F302	Spiess-Opel	1–5, 8
(Italy) W.R.C. / RP Motorsport	8	(Italy) Franco Ghiotto	Dallara F302	Spiess-Opel	6
(Italy) W.R.C. / RP Motorsport	29	(Italy) Matteo Cressoni	Dallara F302	Spiess-Opel	4–9
(Italy) Passoli Racing	9	(Switzerland) Giacomo Mettel	Dallara F302	Spiess-Opel	1–5, 7
(Italy) Passoli Racing	11	(Italy) Leonardo Orecchioni	Dallara F302	Spiess-Opel	1–4
(Italy) Passoli Racing	31	(Italy) Alessandro Bonetti	Dallara F302	Spiess-Opel	6–9
(Italy) Corbetta Competizioni	12	(Italy) Davide Mazzoleni	Dallara F302	Mugen-Honda	All
(Italy) Corbetta Competizioni	14	(Italy) Stefano Gattuso	Dallara F302	Mugen-Honda	All
(Italy) Imola Racing	15	(Italy) Giacomo Piccini	Dallara F302	Spiess-Opel	All
(Italy) Imola Racing	16	(Netherlands) Nicky Pastorelli	Dallara F302	Spiess-Opel	1–2
(Italy) Style Car Racing	18	(Italy) Imeiro Brigliadori	Dallara F302	Spiess-Opel	All
(Italy) Style Car Racing	19	(Italy) Gianpiero Negrotti	Dallara F302	Spiess-Opel	All
(Italy) Coloni Motorsport	21	(San Marino) Christian Montanari	Lola-Dome F106	Spiess-Opel	All
(Italy) Coloni Motorsport	22	(Italy) Marco Bonanomi	Lola-Dome F106	Spiess-Opel	All
(Italy) Lucidi Motors	23	(Belgium) Gregory Franchi	Dallara F302	Spiess-Opel	All
(Italy) Savelli Racing	24	(Italy) Andrea Tiso	Dallara F302	Spiess-Opel	1–4, 6–9
(Italy) Team Ghinzani	25	(Portugal) Álvaro Parente	Dallara F302	Mugen-Honda	1, 9
(Italy) Team Ghinzani	26	(Netherlands) Robert Doornbos	Dallara F302	Mugen-Honda	1
(Italy) Team Ghinzani	27	(Austria) Philipp Baron	Dallara F302	Mugen-Honda	8–9
(Italy) Dracone	28	(Italy) Francesco Dracone	Dallara F302	Spiess-Opel	4, 7
(Italy) RP Motorsport	32	(Italy) Davide Valsecchi	Dallara F302	Spiess-Opel	9
(Italy) RP Motorsport	37	(Finland) Toni Vilander	Dallara F302	Renault	6, 9
(Italy) Drumel Motorsport	38	(Austria) Philipp Baron	Dallara F302	Renault	4
(France) JMP Racing	39	(France) Jean Louis Bianchina	Dallara F302	Renault	8
(Italy) Merelli	38	(Italy) Alfredo Merelli	Dallara F395	Fiat	1, 3–4
(Italy) Gozzo	38	(Italy) Emanuele Gozzo	Dallara F395	Fiat	4

== Calendar ==
All rounds were held in Italy.

Round	Circuit	Date	Pole position	Fastest lap	Winning driver	Winning team
1	Misano World Circuit	30 March	(Portugal) Álvaro Parente	(Portugal) Álvaro Parente	(Portugal) Álvaro Parente	(Italy) Team Ghinzani
2	Autodromo del Levante, Binetto	13 April	(Italy) Fausto Ippoliti	(Belgium) Gregory Franchi	(Italy) Fausto Ippoliti	(Italy) Target Racing
3	Autodromo dell'Umbria, Magione	27 April	(Italy) Fausto Ippoliti	(Italy) Fausto Ippoliti	(Italy) Fausto Ippoliti	(Italy) Target Racing
4	Imola Circuit, Imola	18 May	(Italy) Omar Galeffi	(Italy) Davide Mazzoleni	(Italy) Marco Bonanomi	(Italy) Coloni Motorsport
5	Autodromo di Pergusa, Enna	15 June	(Italy) Omar Galeffi	(Italy) Omar Galeffi	(Italy) Omar Galeffi	(Italy) Target Racing
6	Mugello Circuit, Scarperia	13 July	(Finland) Toni Vilander	(San Marino) Christian Montanari	(San Marino) Christian Montanari	(Italy) Coloni Motorsport
7	Autodromo Riccardo Paletti, Varano	7 September	(Italy) Marco Bonanomi	(Italy) Marco Bonanomi	(Italy) Davide Mazzoleni	(Italy) Corbetta Competizioni
8	Monza Circuit, Monza	28 September	(San Marino) Christian Montanari	(Belgium) Gregory Franchi	(San Marino) Christian Montanari	(Italy) Coloni Motorsport
9	Vallelunga Circuit, Campagnano di Roma	12 October	(San Marino) Christian Montanari	(San Marino) Christian Montanari	(San Marino) Christian Montanari	(Italy) Coloni Motorsport

== Standings ==
- Points are awarded as follows:

1	2	3	4	5	6	7	8	9	10	PP	FL
20	15	12	10	8	6	4	3	2	1	**1**	1

Pos	Driver	MIS	BIN	MAG	IMO	PER	MUG	VAR	MNZ	VLL	Pts
1	(Italy) Fausto Ippoliti	2	**1**	**1**	6	2	7	5	9	5	101
2	(San Marino) Christian Montanari	Ret	3	Ret	3	4	1	Ret	**1**	**1**	98
3	(Belgium) Gregory Franchi	3	Ret	5	4	3	3	4	3	Ret	78
4	(Italy) Marco Bonanomi	Ret	Ret	2	1	9	5	**Ret**	2	2	77
5	(Italy) Giacomo Piccini	Ret	2	8	2	6	4	7	5	4	71
6	(Italy) Omar Galeffi	8	6	3	**7**	**1**	10	3	12	7	65
7	(Italy) Stefano Gattuso	9	5	Ret	5	5	9	2	11	8	46
8	(Italy) Davide Mazzoleni	7	4	9	13	7	8	1	17	10	45
9	(Portugal) Álvaro Parente	**1**								3	34
10	(Italy) Giovanni Berton	5	8	4	9	8			6		32
11	(Italy) Matteo Cressoni				8	Ret	6	Ret	4	14	19
12	(Finland) Toni Vilander						**2**			DNS	16
13	(Italy) Giorgio Sernagiotto	4	Ret	7	Ret						14
14	(Italy) Andrea Tiso	10	9	12	Ret		12	6	10	9	12
15	(Austria) Philipp Baron				10				8	6	10
16	(Italy) Leonardo Orecchioni	14	Ret	6	Ret						6
17	(Netherlands) Robert Doornbos	6									6
18	(Italy) Alessandro Bonetti						11	9	7	12	6
19	(Netherlands) Nicky Pastorelli	Ret	7								4
20	(Switzerland) Giacomo Mettel	11	Ret	11	12	12		8			3
21	(Italy) Imeiro Brigliadori	12	Ret	10	11	10	Ret	10	14	11	3
22	(Italy) Gianpiero Negrotti	13	10	13	Ret	11	14	11	16	13	1
23	(Italy) Gianmaria Gabbiani						13		13		0
24	(Italy) Alfredo Merelli	Ret		14	Ret						0
25	(Italy) Francesco Dracone				14			Ret			0
26	(Italy) Emanuele Gozzo				15						0
27	(France) Jean Louis Bianchina								15		0
	(Italy) Franco Ghiotto						Ret				0
	(Italy) Davide Valsecchi									Ret	0
Pos	Driver	MIS	BIN	MAG	IMO	PER	MUG	VAR	MNZ	VLL	Pts

Colour	Result
Gold	Winner
Silver	Second place
Bronze	Third place
Green	Points classification
Blue	Non-points classification
Blue	Non-classified finish (NC)
Purple	Retired, not classified (Ret)
Red	Did not qualify (DNQ)
Red	Did not pre-qualify (DNPQ)
Black	Disqualified (DSQ)
White	Did not start (DNS)
White	Withdrew (WD)
White	Race cancelled (C)
Blank	Did not practice (DNP)
Blank	Did not arrive (DNA)
Blank	Excluded (EX)

**Bold** – Pole
Italics – Fastest Lap
