= Neel Jani =

Swiss racing driver (born 1983)

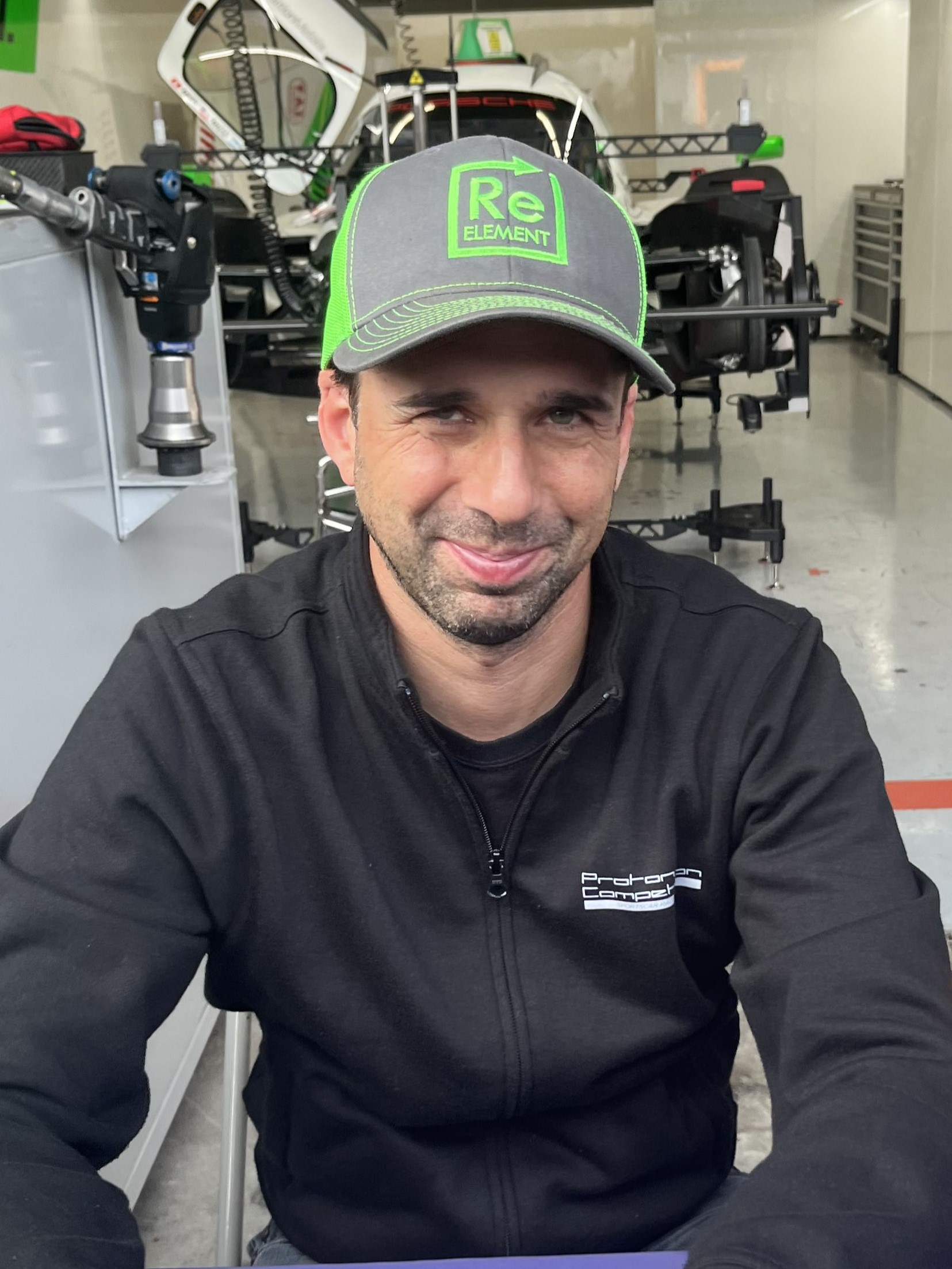
- Jani at the 2025 6 Hours of São Paulo
- Nationality: (Switzerland) Swiss
- Born: 8 December 1983 (age 42) Rorschach, Switzerland

FIA World Endurance Championship career
- Debut season: 2011 (ILMC)
- Current team: Proton Competition
- Categorisation: FIA Platinum
- Car number: 99
- Championships: 1 (2016)
- Wins: 7
- Podiums: 28
- Poles: 15
- Finished last season: 27th

Previous series
- 1998–2000 2000 2001–2002 2003–2004 2005–2006 2005–2009 2007 2010: Karting; Formula Lista Junior; Formula Renault 2000 Eurocup; Formula Renault V6 Eurocup; GP2 Series; A1 Grand Prix; Champ Car World Series; Le Mans Series

24 Hours of Le Mans career
- Years: 2009–2019
- Teams: Speedy Racing Team Sebah, Rebellion Racing, Porsche Team
- Best finish: 1st (2016)
- Class wins: 1

Neel Jani (born 8 December 1983) is a Swiss professional racing driver.

Jani achieved his greatest success winning the 24 Hours of Le Mans in 2016 after first joining Porsche's LMP1 programme for the 2014 season driving in the FIA World Endurance Championship. Previously, Jani drove for A1 Team Switzerland in A1 Grand Prix, helping them win the 2007–2008 title and finishing runner-up in 2005–06 and 2008–09. He raced for PKV Racing in the North American Champ Car series in 2007. He is also a GP2 Series race-winner and will be a Formula One test driver for Audi in 2026.

Jani joined Formula E's Faraday Future Dragon Racing squad for the 2017/2018 season but left the team after one weekend. For the 2019-20 Formula E season, he returned with his home brand Porsche with teammate André Lotterer.

== Early career ==
Born in Rorschach, Switzerland, to a Gujarati Indian father from Gujarat and a Swiss mother, Jani started his career in karting in 1998, where he stayed for two years before moving up to Formula Renault 2000 Eurocup in 2001. In the same year, he also raced some races in Italian Formula Renault. He stayed in both for 2002, again only racing part of the Italian Formula Renault season. In 2003, he moved to Formula Renault V6 Eurocup, driving for the Jenzer team. In that year, he finished second by only four points in the championship with Jenzer Motorsport. In 2004, he again raced in the Formula Renault V6 Eurocup but changed team, running with the French team DAMS, stating in the Swiss press, "This year, it is win or nothing." He finished fourth in the championship that year, while his old team, Jenzer Motorsport finished second with their rookie driver Ryan Sharp.

== GP2 ==
In 2005, Jani raced in the GP2 Series with Racing Engineering alongside Borja García who he generally outperformed. He won two races, at the Hungaroring and at Monza. He also managed to lead most of the Nürburgring race in a clearly slower car with some effective defensive driving.

In 2006, Jani replaced injured Nicolas Lapierre in the Silverstone and Magny-Cours races for English race team Arden. By doing this, he also secured his place in the record books, being the only person to ever drive in both GP2 and F1 on the same day.

== A1 Grand Prix ==
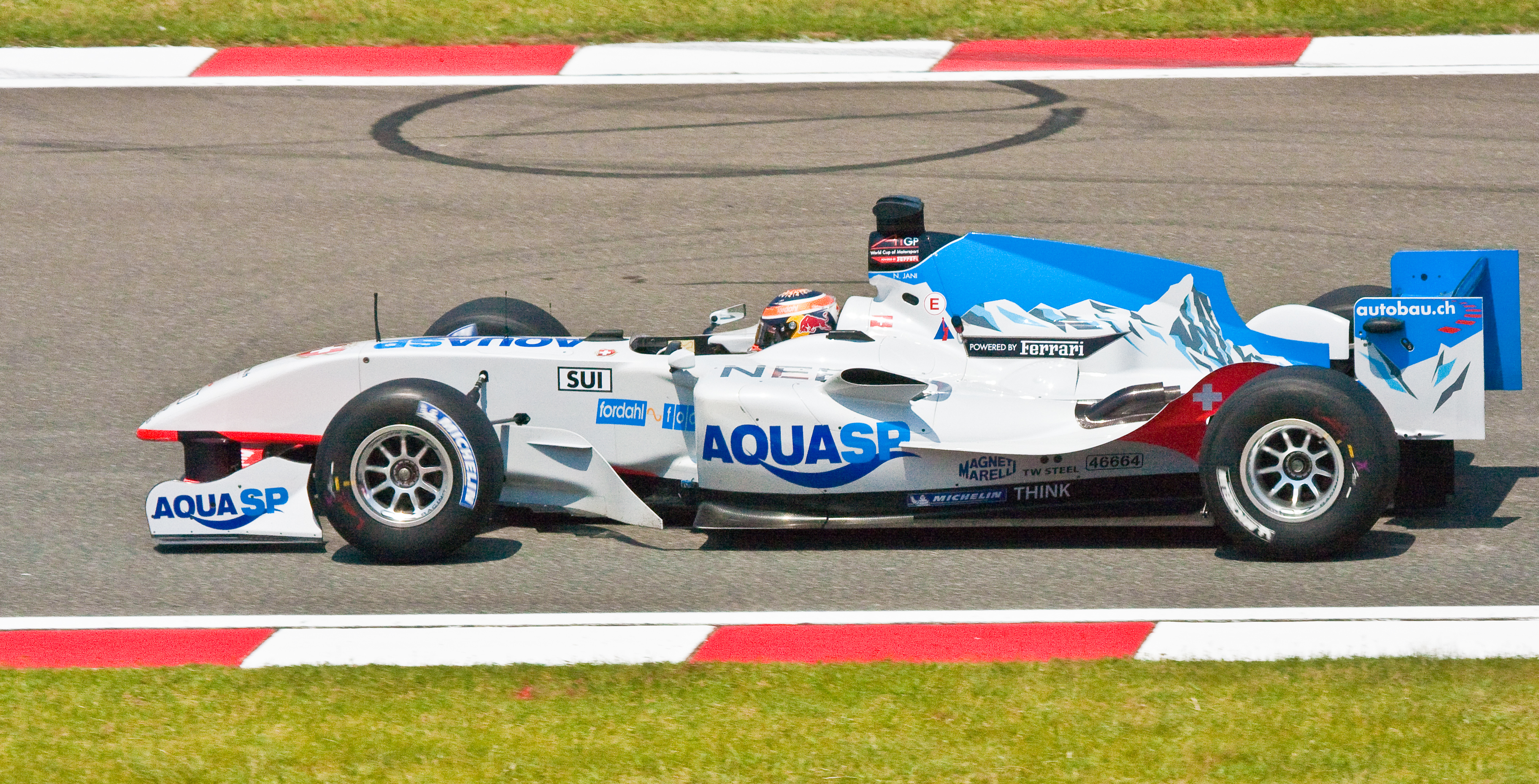
Jani competing for A1 Team Switzerland at the 2008–09 A1 Grand Prix of Nations, South Africa

Jani then raced in the new A1 Grand Prix series, representing his home nation with A1 Team Switzerland. In the inaugural season of A1GP, the team earned the silver medal for second place, with Jani consistently finishing on the podium, including a win at the Dubai Autodrome of the 2005-06 United Arab Emirates Sprint race.

After not attending the first two rounds of the 2006-07 season, and handing the reins to Sébastien Buemi, Jani took another win later in the season at the 2006–07 Malaysia Sprint race.

Jani drove all the races for Switzerland in the 2007-08 season, taking the championship with four wins and 168 points. The team finished second in the 2008-09 season, again with Jani ever-present.

== Formula One ==
Jani was linked to a reserve F1 seat with the Sauber team. In 2004 however, he moved back to GP2 the following year. In December 2005, he was confirmed as Scuderia Toro Rosso's third driver, alongside race drivers Scott Speed and Vitantonio Liuzzi, a role he held throughout the 2006 season, before departing to pursue a Champ Car career. For the 2008 F1 season, Jani was linked with the test driving role at Red Bull Racing. As his father is from India, Jani was linked to the proposed Indian-backed buyout of BMW Sauber but this did not succeed. In early 2010, he tested for Force India and was rumoured to be involved with the team that year. However, Force India signed Mercedes driver Paul di Resta as their test and reserve driver.

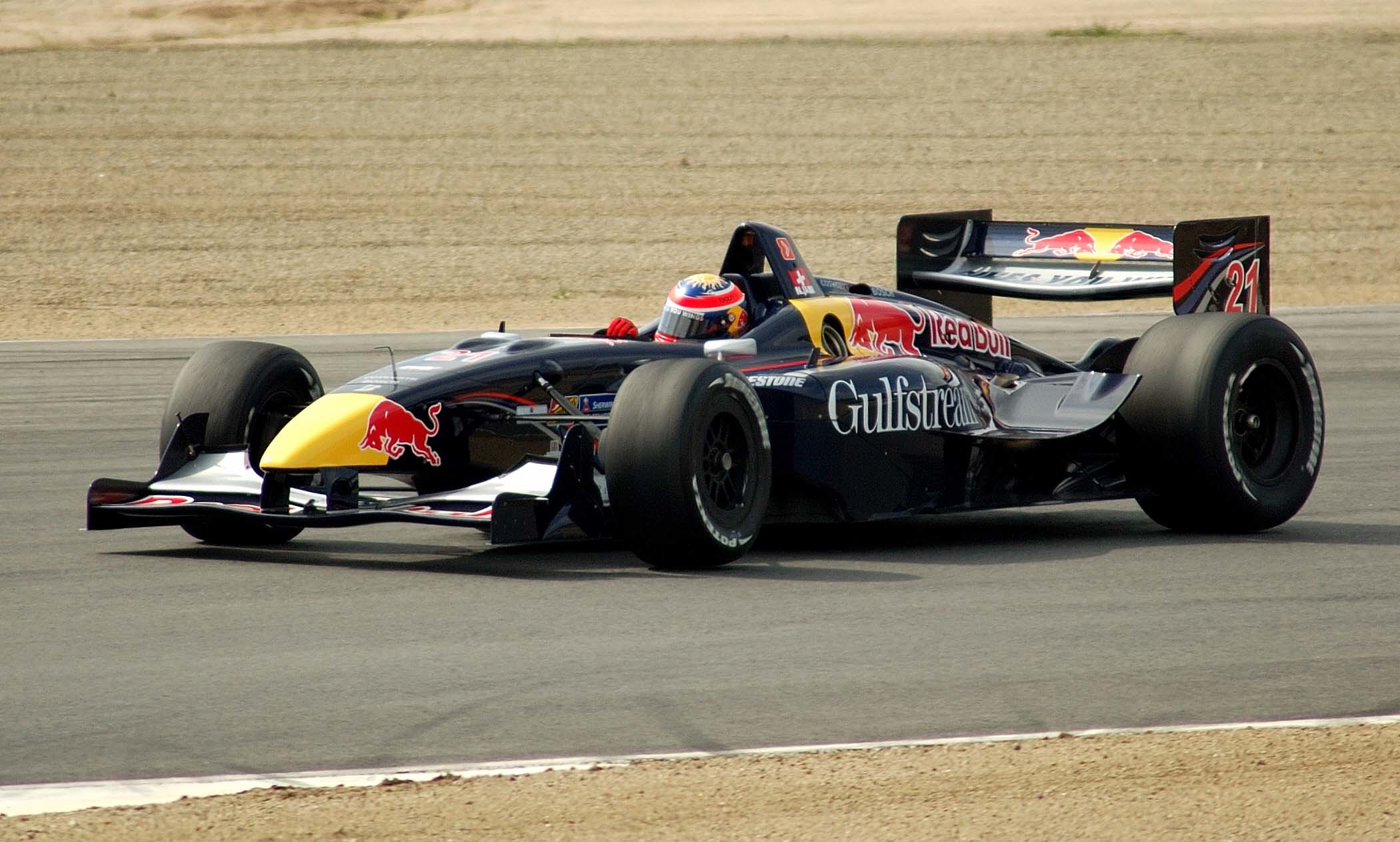
Jani testing his PKV Racing Champ Car

In June 2023, it was announced that Jani had signed with Audi as a simulator driver to help them develop their power unit in preparation for their entry into Formula 1 in 2026.

== Champ Car ==
For 2007, Jani drove for the PKV Racing team in the Champ Car World Series. He ended the series in ninth place with a total of 231 points. After choosing to focus on the 2007-2008 A1GP season rather than stay in ChampCar for 2008, the series was absorbed by the IRL.

== Sports car racing ==
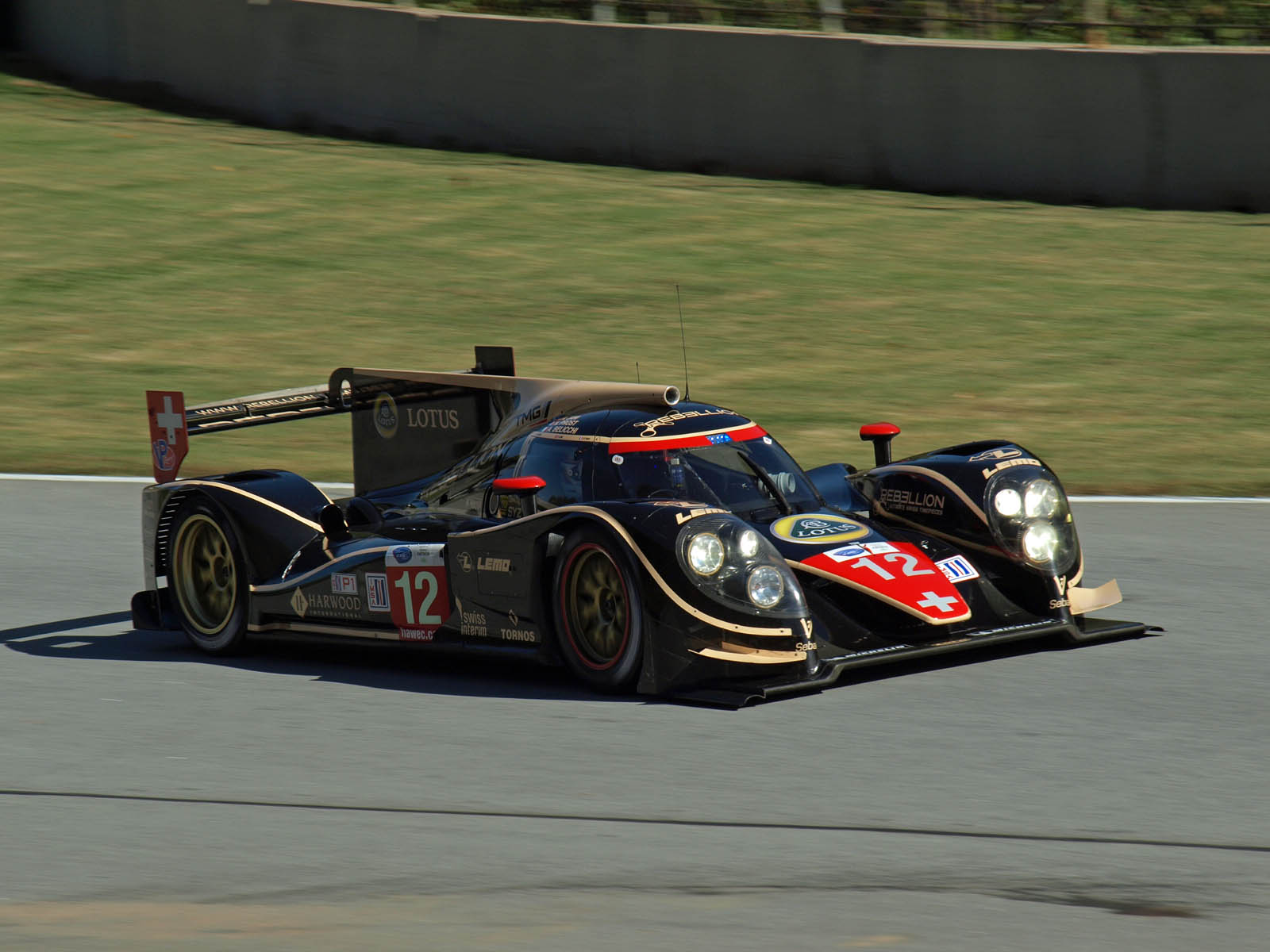
Jani competing in a Lola B12/60 at the 2012 Petit Le Mans

In 2010, Jani became affiliated with Swiss privateer Rebellion Racing and teamed with Nicolas Prost to race a Lola-Judd LMP1 at the Le Mans Series and 24 Hours of Le Mans, finishing second at Algarve and fifth at Silverstone. He also raced the second half of the FIA GT1 season for Matech in a Ford GT, finishing seventh in a championship race and eighth in other two.

Jani took up full-time WEC racing in 2012 with Rebellion, teaming with Prost and Nick Heidfeld for two seasons, before joining the Porsche works team in 2014 and winning his first LMP1 race at São Paulo, Brazil, finishing third overall in the championship. The 2015 season saw Jani take another win at Bahrain in addition to five runner-up spots; again he finished third in the championship.

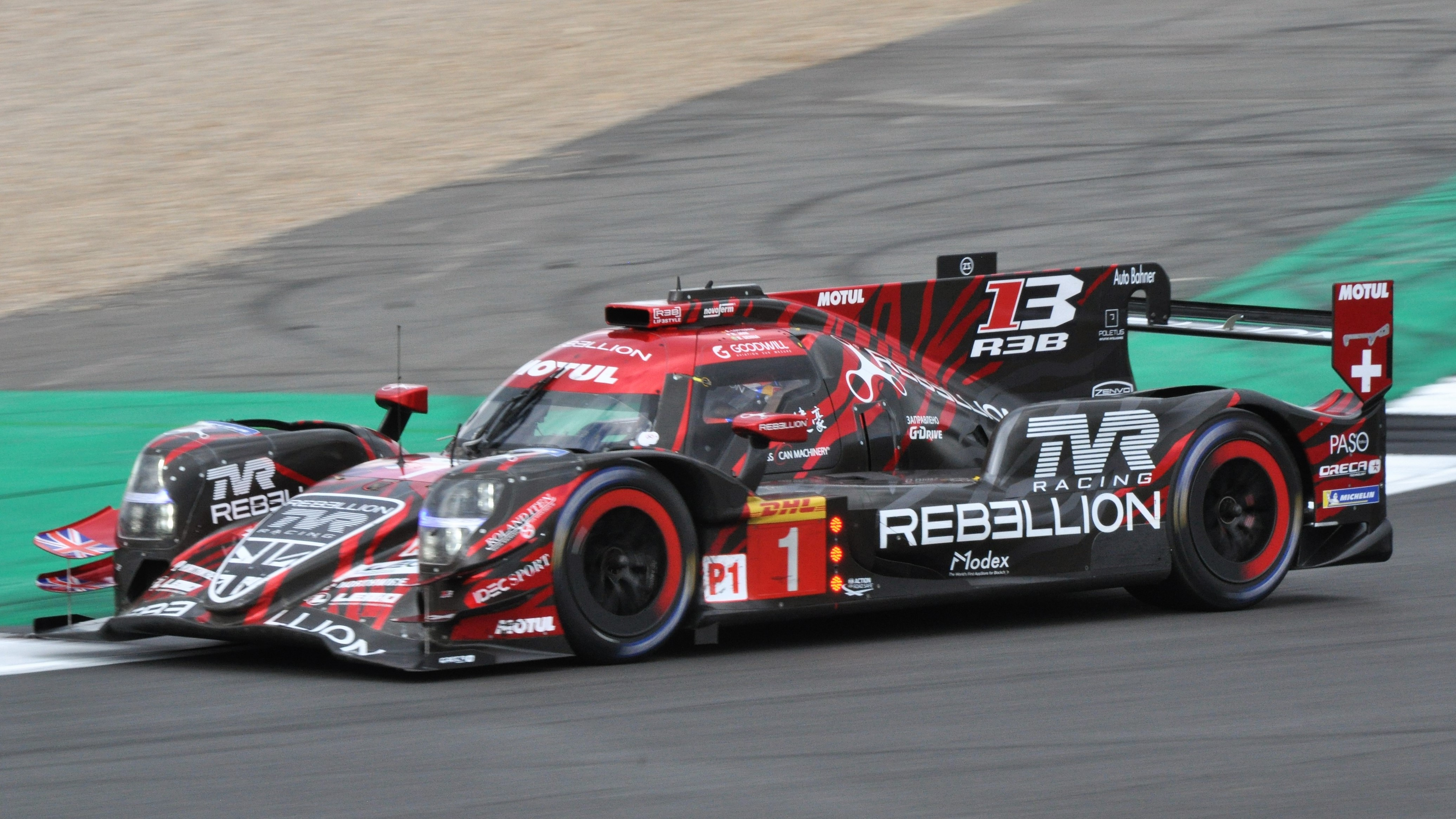
Jani driving in the 2018 6 Hours of Silverstone

Jani kicked off the 2016 WEC season with a win at Silverstone and a second place at Spa before inheriting the win at the 24 Hours of Le Mans in dramatic fashion when Kazuki Nakajima's Toyota broke down in the lead with only one lap to go in the race.

== Return to single-seaters: Formula E ==
On 24 August 2017, it was announced that Jani would make his debut in FIA Formula E Championship in its fourth season at Faraday Future Dragon Racing with Jérôme d'Ambrosio as his teammate. After two 18th-place finishes at the season opener in Hong Kong, Jani abruptly quit the team focusing instead on his WEC commitments with Rebellion Racing.

In December 2018, Porsche announced that Jani would return to the championship as part of their driver line-up for their maiden season. He raced for Porsche with teammate Andre Lotterer till the end of the 2019–20 season, finishing twentieth on the standings. For the 2020-21 Formula E Championship, he was replaced by Pascal Wehrlein.

== Personal life ==
Jani and his wife Lauren have a son.

== Career results ==
=== Racing career summary ===
Season	Series	Team	Races	Wins	Poles	FLaps	Podiums	Points	Position
2000	Formula Lista Junior 1.6	Steiner Motorsport	12	8	?	?	12	197	**1st**
2000	Formula Renault 2000 France	DG Racing	3	0	0	0	0	4	25th
2001	Formula Renault 2000 Eurocup	DG Racing	10	0	0	0	0	8	24th
2001	Formula Renault 2000 France	DG Racing	3	0	0	0	0	7	24th
2001	Formula Renault 2000 Italy	RC Motorsport	2	0	0	0	0	16	19th
2002	Formula Renault 2000 Eurocup	Jenzer Motorsport	9	3	3	2	5	178	**2nd**
2002	Formula Renault 2000 Italy	Jenzer Motorsport	1	0	0	0	0	16	17th
2002	Austria Formula 3 Cup	KMS Motorsport	2	1	0	1	2	32	5th
2003	Formula Renault V6 Eurocup	Jenzer Motorsport	18	4	3	3	12	350	**2nd**
2004	Formula Renault V6 Eurocup	DAMS	19	4	7	4	8	239	4th
2004	FIA GT Championship	DAMS	1	0	0	0	0	0	NC
2004	Formula One	Sauber Petronas	Test driver						
2005	GP2 Series	Racing Engineering	23	2	1	0	2	48	7th
2005	Formula One	Red Bull Racing	Test driver						
2005–06	A1 Grand Prix	A1 Team Switzerland	18	1	2	1	11	121‡	**2nd‡**
2006	GP2 Series	Arden International	4	0	0	0	0	0	25th
2006	Formula One	Scuderia Toro Rosso	Reserve driver						
2006–07	A1 Grand Prix	A1 Team Switzerland	8	1	1	0	1	50‡	8th‡
2007	Champ Car World Series	PKV Racing	14	0	0	0	3	231	9th
2007–08	A1 Grand Prix	A1 Team Switzerland	20	4	6	5	11	168	**1st**
2008	Porsche Supercup	Porsche AG	1	0	0	0	0	0	NC
2008–09	A1 Grand Prix	A1 Team Switzerland	14	4	1	2	7	95	**2nd**
2009	24 Hours of Le Mans	Speedy Racing Team Sebah	1	0	0	0	0	N/A	12th
2010	Le Mans Series - LMP1	Rebellion Racing	5	0	0	0	2	52	5th
2010	24 Hours of Le Mans	Rebellion Racing	1	0	0	0	0	N/A	NC
2010	FIA GT1 World Championship	Matech Competition	12	0	0	0	0	14	33rd
2010	Superleague Formula	Olympiacos CFP	2	1	0	0	1	653‡	4th‡
2011	Le Mans Series - LMP1	Rebellion Racing	5	0	2	0	1	37	**3rd**
2011	Intercontinental Le Mans Cup	Rebellion Racing	5	0	0	0	0	50‡	**3rd‡**
2011	24 Hours of Le Mans	Rebellion Racing	1	0	0	0	0	N/A	6th
2011	American Le Mans Series - LMP1	Rebellion Racing	2	0	0	0	0	N/A	NC
2011	Superleague Formula	Belgium–R.S.C. Anderlecht	6	0	0	0	2	125	5th
2012	FIA World Endurance Championship	Rebellion Racing	8	0	0	0	0	86.5	4th
2012	24 Hours of Le Mans	Rebellion Racing	1	0	0	0	0	N/A	4th
2012	American Le Mans Series - LMP1	Rebellion Racing	1	1	1	1	1	N/A	NC
2013	FIA World Endurance Championship	Rebellion Racing	3	0	0	0	0	21	16th
2013	24 Hours of Le Mans	Rebellion Racing	1	0	0	0	0	N/A	7th
2013	American Le Mans Series - LMP1	Rebellion Racing	4	1	3	1	4	82	**2nd**
2014	FIA World Endurance Championship - LMP1-H	Porsche Team	8	1	3	0	3	117	**3rd**
2014	24 Hours of Le Mans - LMP1-H	Porsche Team	1	0	0	0	0	N/A	4th
2015	FIA World Endurance Championship	Porsche Team	8	1	2	2	6	138.5	**3rd**
2015	24 Hours of Le Mans	Porsche Team	1	0	1	0	0	N/A	5th
2016	FIA World Endurance Championship	Porsche Team	9	2	1	1	3	160	**1st**
2016	24 Hours of Le Mans	Porsche Team	1	1	1	0	1	N/A	**1st**
2017	FIA World Endurance Championship	Porsche LMP Team	9	0	3	2	7	129	4th
2017	24 Hours of Le Mans	Porsche LMP Team	1	0	0	0	0	N/A	NC
2017	IMSA SportsCar Championship - Prototype	Rebellion Racing	2	0	1	0	0	45	26th
2017–18	Formula E	Dragon Racing	2	0	0	0	0	0	25th
2018	24 Hours of Le Mans	Rebellion Racing	1	0	0	0	0	N/A	4th
2018–19	FIA World Endurance Championship	Rebellion Racing	8	0	0	0	2	91	5th
2019	24 Hours of Le Mans	Rebellion Racing	1	0	0	0	0	N/A	4th
2019–20	Formula E	TAG Heuer Porsche Formula E Team	11	0	0	0	0	8	20th
2020	IMSA SportsCar Championship - GTLM	Porsche GT Team	1	0	0	0	1	32	14th
2020–21	Formula E	TAG Heuer Porsche Formula E Team	Reserve driver						
2021	FIA World Endurance Championship - LMGTE	Porsche GT Team	6	3	0	0	6	166	**2nd**
2021–22	Formula E	TAG Heuer Porsche Formula E Team	Reserve driver						
2022	IMSA SportsCar Championship - DPi	Cadillac Racing	1	1	0	0	1	378	19th
2022	Indian Racing League	Hyderabad Blackbirds	5	3	2	3	3	137	**2nd**
2023	FIA World Endurance Championship - Hypercar	Proton Competition	3	0	0	0	0	4	20th
2023	IMSA SportsCar Championship - GTP	Proton Competition	1	0	0	0	1	321	20th
2023	European Le Mans Series - LMP2	Duqueine Team	6	1	0	1	1	79	4th
2023	24 Hours of Le Mans - LMP2	Duqueine Team	1	0	0	0	1	N/A	**3rd**
2023	Asian Le Mans Series - LMP2	99 Racing	4	0	2	0	2	49	4th
2023	Indian Racing League	Hyderabad Blackbirds	2	0	0	0	1	56‡	6th‡
2024	FIA World Endurance Championship - Hypercar	Proton Competition	8	0	0	0	0	13	24th
2024	IMSA SportsCar Championship - GTP	Proton Competition Mustang Sampling	1	0	0	0	0	281	30th
2024	Indian Racing League	Hyderabad Blackbirds	3	0	1	1	2	73‡	8th‡
2025	FIA World Endurance Championship - Hypercar	Proton Competition	8	0	0	0	0	1	27th
2025	IMSA SportsCar Championship - GTP	Proton Competition	3	0	0	0	0	914	18th
2025	IMSA SportsCar Championship - GTP	JDC–Miller MotorSports	1	0	0	0	0	914	18th
2025	Indian Racing League	Kichcha's Kings Bengaluru							
2025	European Le Mans Series - LMP2	DKR Engineering	1	0	0	0	0	10	13th
2026	European Endurance Prototype Cup	Cogemo Racing Team							
2026	Formula One	Audi Revolut F1 Team	Development driver						

^{*} Season still in progress.
^{‡}Team standings.

=== Complete Formula Renault 2.0 Eurocup results ===
(key) (Races in bold indicate pole position) (Races in italics indicate fastest lap)

Year	Entrant	1	2	3	4	5	6	7	8	9	10	DC	Points
2001	DG Racing	MNZ; 14	BRN; 25	MAG; Ret	SIL; 10	ZOL; 12	HUN; 23	A1R; Ret	NÜR; 30	JAR; Ret	EST; 8	24th	8
2002	Jenzer Motorsport	MAG; 8	SIL; 3	JAR; 10	**AND**; 1	OSC; 2	**SPA**; 1	IMO; 6	DON; 4	**EST**; 1		2nd	178

=== Complete Formula Renault V6 Eurocup results ===
(key) (Races in bold indicate pole position) (Races in italics indicate fastest lap)

Year	Entrant	1	2	3	4	5	6	7	8	9	10	11	12	13	14	15	16	17	18	19	DC	Points
2003	Jenzer Motorsport	CAT; 1; 1	CAT; 2; 1	MAG; 1; 2	MAG; 2; 6	MON; Ret	DON; 1; 3	DON; 2; 4	SPA1; 2	**SPA2**; **1**; 3	SPA2; 2; 3	AND; 1; 2	AND; 2; 3	OSC; 1; 10	OSC; 2; 6	EST; 1; 4	EST; 2; 2	**MNZ**; **1**; 1	MNZ; 2; 1		2nd	350
2004	DAMS	MNZ; 1 Ret	MNZ; 2; 7	VAL; 1 Ret	VAL; 2; 10	MAG; 1; 2	MAG; 2; 10	**MON**; 2	**BRN**; **1**; 1	**BRN**; **2**; 1	DON; 1; 10	DON; 2; 5	**SPA**; **1**; 1	**SPA**; **2**; 2	IMO; 1 Ret	**IMO**; **2** Ret	OSC; 1; 8	**OSC**; **2**; 1	DUB; 1; 2	DUB; 2; 16	4th	239

=== Complete GP2 Series results ===
(key) (Races in bold indicate pole position) (Races in italics indicate fastest lap)

Year	Entrant	1	2	3	4	5	6	7	8	9	10	11	12	13	14	15	16	17	18	19	20	21	22	23	DC	Points
2005	Racing Engineering	IMO; FEA; 6	IMO; SPR; 15	CAT; FEA; 4	CAT; SPR; 5	MON; FEA; Ret	NÜR; FEA; 6	NÜR; SPR; 13†	MAG; FEA; 5	MAG; SPR; 4	SIL; FEA; 5	SIL; SPR; 6	HOC; FEA; Ret	HOC; SPR; 22	**HUN**; **FEA**; 1	HUN; SPR; 4	IST; FEA; Ret	IST; SPR; Ret	MNZ; FEA; 7	MNZ; SPR; 1	SPA; FEA; 16	SPA; SPR; 18	BHR; FEA; 16	BHR; SPR; 13	7th	48
2006	Arden International Ltd	VAL; FEA	VAL; SPR	IMO; FEA	IMO; SPR	NÜR; FEA	NÜR; SPR	CAT; FEA	CAT; SPR	MON; FEA	SIL; FEA; NC	SIL; SPR; Ret	MAG; FEA; 11	MAG; SPR; 7	HOC; FEA	HOC; SPR	HUN; FEA	HUN; SPR	IST; FEA	IST; SPR	MNZ; FEA	MNZ; SPR			25th	0

=== Complete A1 Grand Prix results ===
(key) (Races in bold indicate pole position) (Races in italics indicate fastest lap)

Year	Entrant	1	2	3	4	5	6	7	8	9	10	11	12	13	14	15	16	17	18	19	20	21	22	DC	Points
2005–06	Switzerland	GBR; SPR; 9	GBR; FEA; Ret	GER; SPR; 2	GER; FEA; 5	POR; SPR; 3	POR; FEA; 2	AUS; SPR; 6	AUS; FEA; 3	**MYS**; **SPR**; 2	MYS; FEA; 2	**UAE**; **SPR**; 1	UAE; FEA; Ret	RSA; SPR; 3	RSA; FEA; 2	IDN; SPR; 5	IDN; FEA; 5	MEX; SPR; 2	MEX; FEA; 3	USA; SPR	USA; FEA	CHN; SPR	CHN; FEA	2nd	121
2006–07	Switzerland	NED; SPR	NED; FEA	CZE; SPR	CZE; FEA	BEI; SPR; 9	BEI; FEA; Ret	**MYS**; **SPR**; 1	MYS; FEA; 4	IDN; SPR; 10	IDN; FEA; 8	NZL; SPR	NZL; FEA	AUS; SPR	AUS; FEA	RSA; SPR; 5	RSA; FEA; 4	MEX; SPR	MEX; FEA	SHA; SPR	SHA; FEA	GBR; SPR	GBR; SPR	8th	50
2007–08	Switzerland	NED; SPR; 5	NED; FEA; 3	CZE; SPR; 8	CZE; FEA; 3	**MYS**; **SPR**; 1	**MYS**; **FEA**; 1	ZHU; SPR; 2	**ZHU**; **FEA**; 6	NZL; SPR; Ret	NZL; FEA; 13	AUS; SPR; 10	AUS; FEA; 2	RSA; SPR; 3	**RSA**; **FEA**; 1	MEX; SPR; 3	MEX; FEA; 19	**SHA**; **SPR**; 1	**SHA**; **FEA**; 5	GBR; SPR; 4	GBR; SPR; 3			1st	168
2008–09	Switzerland	NED; SPR; 5	NED; FEA; Ret	CHN; SPR; 4	CHN; FEA; 4	**MYS**; **SPR**; 1	MYS; FEA; Ret	NZL; SPR; 2	NZL; FEA; 1	RSA; SPR; 3	RSA; FEA; 1	POR; SPR; 15	POR; FEA; 1	GBR; SPR; 8	GBR; SPR; 3									2nd	95

=== Formula One ===
(key)

Year	Entrant	Chassis	Engine	1	2	3	4	5	6	7	8	9	10	11	12	13	14	15	16	17	18	WDC	Points
2006	Scuderia Toro Rosso	Toro Rosso STR1	Cosworth V10	BHR; TD	MAL; TD	AUS; TD	SMR; TD	EUR; TD	ESP; TD	MON; TD	GBR; TD	CAN; TD	USA; TD	FRA; TD	GER; TD	HUN; TD	TUR; TD	ITA; TD	CHN; TD	JPN; TD	BRA; TD	-	-

=== American Open Wheel ===
(key) (Races in bold indicate pole position, races in italics indicate fastest race lap)

==== Champ Car ====
Year	Team	No.	Chassis	Engine	1	2	3	4	5	6	7	8	9	10	11	12	13	14	Rank	Points	Ref
2007	PKV Racing	21	Panoz DP01	Cosworth XFE V8 t	LVG; 10	LBH; 7	HOU; 15	POR; 12	CLE; 3	MTT; 6	TOR; 2	EDM; 9	SJO; 2	ROA; 10	ZOL; 8	ASN; 5	SRF; 8	MXC; 9	**9th**	**231**	

=== Complete 24 Hours of Le Mans results ===
Year	Team	Co-Drivers	Car	Class	Laps	Pos.	Class Pos.
2009	(Switzerland) Speedy Racing Team (United Kingdom) Sebah Automotive	(Italy) Andrea Belicchi (France) Nicolas Prost	Lola B08/60-Aston Martin	LMP1	342	14th	12th
2010	(Switzerland) Rebellion Racing	(France) Nicolas Prost (United States) Marco Andretti	Lola B10/60-Rebellion	LMP1	175	DNF	DNF
2011	(Switzerland) Rebellion Racing	(France) Nicolas Prost (Netherlands) Jeroen Bleekemolen	Lola B10/60-Toyota	LMP1	338	6th	6th
2012	(Switzerland) Rebellion Racing	(France) Nicolas Prost (Germany) Nick Heidfeld	Lola B12/60-Toyota	LMP1	367	4th	4th
2013	(Switzerland) Rebellion Racing	(France) Nicolas Prost (Germany) Nick Heidfeld	Lola B12/60-Toyota	LMP1	275	39th	7th
2014	(Germany) Porsche Team	(Germany) Marc Lieb (France) Romain Dumas	Porsche 919 Hybrid	LMP1-H	348	11th	4th
2015	(Germany) Porsche Team	(Germany) Marc Lieb (France) Romain Dumas	Porsche 919 Hybrid	LMP1	391	5th	5th
2016	(Germany) Porsche Team	(France) Romain Dumas (Germany) Marc Lieb	Porsche 919 Hybrid	LMP1	384	**1st**	**1st**
2017	(Germany) Porsche LMP Team	(United Kingdom) Nick Tandy (Germany) André Lotterer	Porsche 919 Hybrid	LMP1	318	DNF	DNF
2018	(Switzerland) Rebellion Racing	(Germany) André Lotterer (Brazil) Bruno Senna	Rebellion R13-Gibson	LMP1	375	4th	4th
2019	(Switzerland) Rebellion Racing	(Germany) André Lotterer (Brazil) Bruno Senna	Rebellion R13-Gibson	LMP1	376	4th	4th
2021	(Germany) Porsche GT Team	(France) Kévin Estre (Denmark) Michael Christensen	Porsche 911 RSR-19	GTE; Pro	344	22nd	**3rd**
2023	(France) Duqueine Team	(Austria) René Binder (Chile) Nico Pino	Oreca 07-Gibson	LMP2	327	11th	**3rd**
2024	(Germany) Proton Competition	(France) Julien Andlauer (United Kingdom) Harry Tincknell	Porsche 963	Hypercar	251	45th	16th
2025	(Germany) Proton Competition	(Chile) Nico Pino (Argentina) Nicolás Varrone	Porsche 963	Hypercar	383	13th	13th

=== Complete GT1 World Championship results ===
Year	Team	Car	1	2	3	4	5	6	7	8	9	10	11	12	13	14	15	16	17	18	19	20	Pos	Points
2010	Matech Competition	Ford GT1	ABU; QR	ABU; CR	SIL; QR	SIL; CR	BRN; QR	BRN; CR	PRI; QR	PRI; CR	SPA; QR; 20	SPA; CR; 14	NÜR; QR; 8	NÜR; CR; 16	ALG; QR; 20	ALG; CR; 12	NAV; QR; 4	NAV; CR; 7	INT; QR; 7	INT; CR; 8	SAN; QR; 17	SAN; CR; 8	33rd	14

=== Complete Superleague Formula results ===
(key) (Races in bold indicate pole position) (Races in italics indicate fastest lap)

Year	Team	1	2	3	4	5	6	7	8	9	10	11	12	13	14	15	16	17	18	19	20	21	22	23	24	Pos	Points
2010	Olympiacos CFP GU-Racing International	SIL; 1	SIL; 2	ASS; 1	ASS; 2	MAG; 1	MAG; 2	JAR; 1	JAR; 2	NÜR; 1	NÜR; 2	ZOL; 1	ZOL; 2	BRH; 1	BRH; 2	ADR; 1	ADR; 2	POR; 1; 14	POR; 2; 1	ORD; 1	ORD; 2	BEI; 1	BEI; 2	NAV; 1	NAV; 2	4th	653
2011	Belgium – RSC Anderlecht Azerti Motorsport	ASS; 1; 4	ASS; 2; 9	ZOL; 1; 2	ZOL; 2; 9																					5th	125

† Non Championship round

==== Super Final results ====
(key) (Races in bold indicate pole position) (Races in italics indicate fastest lap)

Year	Team	1	2	3	4	5	6	7	8	9	10	11	12
2010	Olympiacos CFP GU-Racing International	SIL	ASS	MAG	JAR	NÜR	ZOL	BRH	ADR	POR; DNQ	ORD	BEI	NAV
2011	Belgium – RSC Anderlecht Azerti Motorsport	ASS; 7	ZOL; 3										

=== Complete European Le Mans Series results ===
Year	Entrant	Class	Chassis	Engine	1	2	3	4	5	6	Rank	Points
2010	Rebellion Racing	LMP1	Lola B10/60	Rebellion (Judd) 5.5 L V10	LEC; 7	SPA; Ret	ALG; 2	HUN; 2	SIL; 5		7th	52
2011	Rebellion Racing	LMP1	Lola B10/60	Toyota RV8KLM 3.4 L V8	**LEC**; 3	SPA; 7	IMO; 6	SIL; Ret	**EST**; 3		3rd	37
2023	Duqueine Team	LMP2	Oreca 07	Gibson GK428 4.2 L V8	CAT; 1	LEC; 2	ARA; 6	SPA; 6	ALG; 5	POR; 5	4th	79
2025	DKR Engineering	LMP2 Pro-Am	Oreca 07	Gibson GK428 4.2 L V8	CAT	LEC	IMO	SPA	SIL	ALG; 5	13th	10

=== Complete FIA World Endurance Championship results ===
Year	Entrant	Class	Chassis	Engine	1	2	3	4	5	6	7	8	9	Rank	Points
2012	Rebellion Racing	LMP1	Lola B12/60	Toyota RV8KLM 3.4 L V8	SEB; 17	SPA; 4	LMS; 3	SIL; 6	SÃO; 4	BHR; 4	FUJ; 4	SHA; Ret		4th	86.5
2013	Rebellion Racing	LMP1	Lola B12/60	Toyota RV8KLM 3.4 L V8	SIL; 5	SPA; 5	LMS; 25	SÃO	COA	FUJ	SHA	BHR		16th	21
2014	Porsche Team	LMP1	Porsche 919 Hybrid	Porsche 2.0 L V4 (Hybrid)	SIL; Ret	**SPA**; 4	LMS; 5	COA; 4	FUJ; 4	**SHA**; 3	**BHR**; 2	SÃO; 1		3rd	117
2015	Porsche Team	LMP1	Porsche 919 Hybrid	Porsche 2.0 L V4 (Hybrid)	SIL; 2	SPA; 2	**LMS**; 5	**NÜR**; 2	**COA**; 12	FUJ; 2	SHA; 2	BHR; 1		3rd	138.5
2016	Porsche Team	LMP1	Porsche 919 Hybrid	Porsche 2.0 L Turbo V4 (Hybrid)	SIL; 1	SPA; 2	**LMS**; 1	NÜR; 4	MEX; 4	COA; 4	FUJ; 5	SHA; 4	BHR; 6	1st	160
2017	Porsche LMP Team	LMP1	Porsche 919 Hybrid	Porsche 2.0 L Turbo V4 (Hybrid)	SIL; 3	**SPA**; 4	LMS; Ret	NÜR; 2	MEX; 2	**COA**; 2	FUJ; 3	SHA; 3	**BHR**; 3	4th	129
2018–19	Rebellion Racing	LMP1	Rebellion R13	Gibson GL458 4.5 L V8	SPA; DSQ	LMS; 4	SIL; 2	FUJ; 3	SHA; 4	SEB; Ret	SPA; 5	LMS; 4		5th	91
2021	Porsche GT Team	LMGTE Pro	Porsche 911 RSR-19	Porsche 4.2 L Flat-6	**SPA**; 1	**ALG**; 3	**MNZ**; 1	LMS; 2	**BHR**; 1	**BHR**; 2				2nd	166
2023	Proton Competition	Hypercar	Porsche 963	Porsche 9RD 4.6 L Turbo V8	SEB	ALG	SPA	LMS	MNZ; Ret	FUJ; 9	BHR; 10			20th	4
2024	Proton Competition	Hypercar	Porsche 963	Porsche 9RD 4.6 L Turbo V8	QAT; 9	IMO; NC	SPA; 5	LMS; 14	SÃO; 15	COA; 11	FUJ; 11	BHR; 12		24th	13
2025	Proton Competition	Hypercar	Porsche 963	Porsche 9RD 4.6 L Turbo V8	QAT; 15	IMO; 14	SPA; Ret	LMS; 12	SÃO; 10	COA; 13	FUJ; 12	BHR; 17		27th	1

=== Complete American Le Mans Series results ===
Year	Entrant	Class	Chassis	Engine	1	2	3	4	5	6	7	8	9	10	Rank	Points	Ref
2012	Rebellion Racing	P1	Lola B12/60	Toyota RV8KLM 3.4 L V8	SEB	LBH	MTY	LRP	MOS	MDO	ROA	BAL	VIR	**PET**; 1	NC	0	
2013	Rebellion Racing	P1	Lola B12/60	Toyota RV8KLM 3.4 L V8	SEB; 3	**LBH**; 2	**LAG**; 2	LRP	MOS	ROA	BAL	COA	VIR	**PET**; 1	**2nd**	**82**	

=== Complete IMSA SportsCar Championship results ===
Year	Entrant	No.	Class	Chassis	Engine	1	2	3	4	5	6	7	8	9	10	11	Rank	Points	Ref
2017	Rebellion Racing	13	P	Oreca 07	Gibson GK428 4.2 L V8	DAY; 8	**SEB**; 9	LBH	COA	DET	WGL	MOS	ELK	LGA	PET		26th	45	
2020	Porsche GT Team	912	GTLM	Porsche 911 RSR-19	Porsche 4.2 L Flat-6	DAY	DAY	SEB	ELK	VIR	ATL	MDO	CLT	PET	LGA	SEB; 2	14th	32	
2022	Cadillac Racing	02	DPi	Cadillac DPi-V.R	Cadillac 5.5 L V8	DAY	SEB; 1	LBH	LGA	MDO	DET	WGL	MOS	ELK	PET		19th	378	
2023	Proton Competition	59	GTP	Porsche 963	Porsche 9RD 4.6 L Turbo V8	DAY	SEB	LBH	LGA	WGL	MOS	ELK	IMS	PET; 3			20th	321	
2024	Proton Competition Mustang Sampling	5	GTP	Porsche 963	Porsche 9RD 4.6 L Turbo V8	DAY; 5	SEB	LBH	LGA	DET	WGL	ELK	IMS	PET			30th	281	
2025	Proton Competition		GTP	Porsche 963	Porsche 9RD 4.6 L Turbo V8	DAY; 10	SEB; 6	LBH	LGA	DET	WGL; 13	ELK	IMS				18th	914	
2025	JDC–Miller MotorSports		GTP	Porsche 963	Porsche 9RD 4.6 L Turbo V8									PET; 12			18th	914	

^{*} Season still in progress.

=== Complete Formula E results ===
(key) (Races in bold indicate pole position; races in italics indicate fastest lap)

Year	Team	Chassis	Powertrain	1	2	3	4	5	6	7	8	9	10	11	12	Pos	Points
2017–18	Dragon Racing	Spark SRT01-e	Penske EV-2	HKG; 18	HKG; 18	MRK	SCL	MEX	PDE	RME	PAR	BER	ZUR	NYC	NYC	25th	0
2019–20	TAG Heuer Porsche Formula E Team	Spark SRT05e	Porsche 99X Electric	DIR; 17	DIR; 13	SCL; Ret	MEX; 14	MRK; 18	BER; 11	BER; 15	BER; Ret	BER; 19	BER; 6	BER; 15		20th	8

=== Complete Indian Racing League results ===
(key) (Races in bold indicate pole position) (Races in italics indicate fastest lap)

Year	Franchise	1	2	3	4	5	6	7	8	9	10	11	12	Pos.	Pts
2022	Hyderabad Blackbirds	HYD1; 1 C	HYD1; 2 C	HYD1; 3 C	IRU1; 1; 1	**IRU1**; **2**	**IRU1**; **3**; 1	IRU2; 1	IRU2; 2; 6	IRU2; 3; 1	HYD2; 1	HYD2; 2	HYD2; 3	2nd	137
2023‡	Hyderabad Blackbirds	IRU1; 1	IRU1; 2	IRU2; 1; 4	IRU2; 2	IRU3; 1	IRU3; 2; 3							6th	56
2024‡	Hyderabad Blackbirds	IRU1; 1 Ret	IRU1; 2	IGR; 1	IGR; 2	IRU2; 1	IRU2; 2	**KAR1**; **1**; 2	KAR1; 2	KAR2; 1; 2	KAR2; 2			8th	73

‡ Standings based on entry points, not individual drivers.

* Season in progress.

=== Complete Asian Le Mans Series results ===
(key) (Races in bold indicate pole position; results in italics indicate fastest lap)

Year	Entrant	Class	Chassis	Engine	1	2	3	4	Rank	Points
2023	99 Racing	LMP2	Oreca 07	Gibson GK428 4.2 L V8	DUB; 1; 3	DUB; 2; 6	**ABU**; **1**; 7	**ABU**; **2**; 2	4th	49

Sporting positions
Preceded by Inaugural	Formula Lista Junior; Champion; 2000	Succeeded by Ken Allemann
Preceded by Nico Hülkenberg; Christian Vietoris (Team Germany)	A1 Grand Prix; Champion (Team Switzerland); 2007–08	Succeeded by Adam Carroll (Team Ireland)
Preceded by Earl Bamber; Nico Hülkenberg; Nick Tandy	Winner of the 24 Hours of Le Mans; 2016; With: Romain Dumas & Marc Lieb	Succeeded by Earl Bamber; Timo Bernhard; Brendon Hartley
Preceded by Mark Webber; Timo Bernhard; Brendon Hartley	FIA World Endurance Champion; 2016; With: Romain Dumas & Marc Lieb	Succeeded by Brendon Hartley; Earl Bamber; Timo Bernhard
