= 2002 Italian Formula Three Championship =

Seasons
- ← 2001 2003 →

The 2002 Italian Formula Three Championship was the 38th Italian Formula Three Championship season. It began on 7 April at Vallelunga and ended on 20 October at Magione after nine races.

Miloš Pavlović of Target Racing won races at Vallelunga, Misano, Varano, Binetto, Mugello and had another three podiums and ultimately clinched the title. He finished 27 points clear of Azeta Racing driver Philip Cloostermans, who won races at Pergusa and Monza. Third place went to Pavlović's teammate Christiano Citron, who won the season-ending race at Magione.

== Teams and drivers ==
Entry List
Team	No	Driver	Chassis (Note: All drivers competed in Dallara chassis; model listed.)	Engine	Rounds
Campionato Nazionale
(Italy) Passoli Racing	2	(Italy) Fausto Ippoliti	F399	Fiat	1–3, 5–9
(Italy) Passoli Racing	3	(Italy) Leonardo Orecchioni	F399	Fiat	1–3
(Italy) Passoli Racing	20	(Italy) Ivan Bellarosa	F302	Fiat	4
(Italy) Passoli Racing	21	(Italy) Davide Uboldi	F302	Fiat	4, 9
(France) Stardrive Motorsport	4	(Algeria) Nassim Sidi Said	F399	Spiess-Opel	1–5
(Italy) Target Racing	5	(Serbia and Montenegro) Miloš Pavlović	F302	Spiess-Opel	All
(Italy) Target Racing	6	(Italy) Christiano Citron	F302	Spiess-Opel	All
(Italy) Brigliadori	7	(Italy) Imeiro Brigliadori	F399	Spiess-Opel	1–6, 8–9
(Italy) Style Car Racing	8	(Italy) Gianpiero Negrotti	F399	Fiat	1–6, 8–9
(Italy) El Kobra	9	(Italy) Andrea Tiso	F302	Fiat	1, 4
(Italy) W.R.C.	10	(Italy) Franco Ghiotto	F302	Spiess-Opel	1–2, 4–6, 8–9
(Italy) W.R.C.	11	(Italy) Sergio Ghiotto	F302	Spiess-Opel	1
(Italy) W.R.C.	18	(Italy) Giampaolo Ermolli	F302	Spiess-Opel	2–7
(Italy) Stentella	12	(Italy) Enzo Stentella	F399	Spiess-Opel	1–2
(Italy) Azeta Racing	14	(Italy) Stefano Mocellini	F399	Spiess-Opel	1–6
(Italy) Azeta Racing	15	(Belgium) Philip Cloostermans	F399	Spiess-Opel	1–8
(Italy) Azeta Racing	19	(Italy) Alessandro Vitacolonna	F399	Spiess-Opel	4–8
(Italy) Petroncini	20	(Italy) Roberto Petroncini	F399	Spiess-Opel	All
(Italy) Scuderia Famà	22	(Italy) Nino Famà	F399	Spiess-Opel	5
(Germany) Bertram Schäfer Racing	23	(Italy) Vitantonio Liuzzi	F302	Spiess-Opel	5
(Germany) Bertram Schäfer Racing	24	(Malaysia) Rizal Ramli	F302	Spiess-Opel	5
(Germany) Bertram Schäfer Racing	25	(Austria) Bernhard Auinger	F302	Spiess-Opel	5
(Estonia) Nemarnik	26	(Estonia) Tom Nemarnik	F399	Fiat	5
(Italy) Team Ghinzani	27	(Netherlands) Robert Doornbos	F302	Mugen-Honda	5
(Italy) Team Ghinzani	28	(Italy) Raffaele Giammaria	F302	Mugen-Honda	5, 9
(Italy) Team Ghinzani	38	(Austria) Andreas Zuber	F302	Mugen-Honda	9
(Italy) Prema Powerteam	29	(Portugal) César Campaniço	F302	Spiess-Opel	5
(Italy) Prema Powerteam	30	(Australia) Ryan Briscoe	F302	Spiess-Opel	5
(Italy) Prema Powerteam	31	(Japan) Kosuke Matsuura	F302	Spiess-Opel	5
(Italy) Dracone	32	(Italy) Francesco Dracone	F302	Spiess-Opel	5
(Italy) Gioga	33	(Italy) Giovanni Gaetani	F399	Fiat	5
(Germany) Team Kolles	35	(Netherlands) Ross Zwolsman	F302	Mugen-Honda	5
(Germany) Team Kolles	36	(Japan) Sakon Yamamoto	F302	Mugen-Honda	5
(Italy) Boga	37	(Italy) Bonifacio Gaetani	F399	Spiess-Opel	8–9
Trofeo Nazionale CSAI
(Italy) Passoli Racing	51	(Italy) Carmine Tancredi	F397	Fiat	All
(Italy) Passoli Racing	64	(Italy) Dino Lusuardi	F393	Fiat	5–9
(Italy) Scuderia Famà	52	(Italy) Nino Famà	F393	Spiess-Opel	1–2
(Italy) Scuderia Famà	63	(Italy) Salvatore Cardullo	F393	Spiess-Opel	4
(Italy) Alberti	53	(Italy) Silvio Alberti	F397	Fiat	2, 4–6
(Italy) Gozzo	54	(Italy) Emanuele Gozzo	F395	Spiess-Opel	2, 4–5
(Italy) Style Car Racing	55	(Italy) Giovanni Rambelli	F393	Fiat	1–6, 8–9
(Italy) Bounomo	56	(Italy) Robert Bounomo	F397	Fiat	All
(Italy) System Team	57	(Italy) Alberto Morelli	F393	Fiat	4–5, 9
(Italy) Faraonio	58	(Italy) Giovanni Faraonio	F393	Fiat	1–2
(Italy) Bicciato	59	(Italy) Renato Bicciato	F397	Fiat	2–8
(Italy) Gioga	61	(Italy) Giovanni Gaetani	F393	Fiat	4
(Italy) Bendinelli	65	(Italy) Carlo Bendinelli	F393	Spiess-Opel	9
(Italy) Ribaudo	66	(Italy) Giorgio Ribaudo	F393	Fiat	5
(Italy) Bellarosa	67	(Italy) Ivan Bellarosa	F397	Fiat	9

== Calendar ==
All rounds were held in Italy.

Round	Circuit	Date	Pole position	Winning driver	Winning team	Trophy winner
1	Vallelunga Circuit, Campagnano di Roma	7 April	(Serbia and Montenegro) Miloš Pavlović	(Serbia and Montenegro) Miloš Pavlović	(Italy) Target Racing	(Italy) Nino Famà
2	Misano World Circuit	28 April	(Serbia and Montenegro) Miloš Pavlović	(Serbia and Montenegro) Miloš Pavlović	(Italy) Target Racing	(Italy) Giovanni Faraonio
3	Autodromo di Pergusa, Enna	19 May	(Serbia and Montenegro) Miloš Pavlović	(Belgium) Philip Cloostermans	(Italy) Azeta Racing	(Italy) Carmine Tancredi
4	Monza Circuit, Monza	30 June	(Belgium) Philip Cloostermans	(Belgium) Philip Cloostermans	(Italy) Azeta Racing	(Italy) Carmine Tancredi
5	Autodromo Riccardo Paletti, Varano	21 July	(Serbia and Montenegro) Miloš Pavlović	(Serbia and Montenegro) Miloš Pavlović	(Italy) Target Racing	(Italy) Carmine Tancredi
6	Imola Circuit, Imola	1 September	(Italy) Vitantonio Liuzzi	(Italy) Vitantonio Liuzzi	(Germany) Bertram Schäfer Racing	(Italy) Silvio Alberti
7	Autodromo del Levante, Binetto	8 September	(Italy) Christiano Citron	(Serbia and Montenegro) Miloš Pavlović	(Italy) Target Racing	(Italy) Carmine Tancredi
8	Mugello Circuit, Scarperia	6 October	(Serbia and Montenegro) Miloš Pavlović	(Serbia and Montenegro) Miloš Pavlović	(Italy) Target Racing	(Italy) Dino Lusuardi
9	Autodromo dell'Umbria, Magione	20 October	(Austria) Andreas Zuber	(Italy) Christiano Citron	(Italy) Target Racing	(Italy) Alberto Morelli

== Standings ==
- Points are awarded as follows:

1	2	3	4	5	6
9	6	4	3	2	1

Pos	Driver	VLL	MIS	PER	MNZ	VAR	IMO	BIN	MUG	MAG	Pts
1	(Serbia and Montenegro) Miloš Pavlović	**1**	**1**	**2**	2	**1**	5	1	**1**	2	65
2	(Belgium) Philip Cloostermans	Ret	2	1	**1**	2	6	3	4		38
3	(Italy) Christiano Citron	2	5	3	5	Ret	8	**7**	5	1	25
4	(Italy) Alessandro Vitacolonna	Ret	4	5	3	3	25	2	2		25
5	(Italy) Fausto Ippoliti	3	Ret	7		Ret	10	4	3	3	15
6	(Italy) Roberto Petroncini	4	6	4	Ret	Ret	Ret	5	7	5	11
7	(Italy) Stefano Mocellini	5	3	Ret	4	6	9				10
8	(Italy) Vitantonio Liuzzi						**1**				9
9	(Japan) Kosuke Matsuura						2				6
10	(Italy) Giampaolo Ermolli		Ret	6	Ret	4	11	6			5
11	(Netherlands) Robert Doornbos						3				4
12	(Portugal) César Campaniço						4				3
13	(Austria) Andreas Zuber									**4**	3
14	(Italy) Nino Famà					5					2
15	(Italy) Franco Ghiotto	6	7		8	7	14		6	11	2
16	(Italy) Davide Uboldi				6					6	2
	(Italy) Imeiro Brigliadori	Ret	8	8	7	Ret	15		8	7	0
	(Italy) Sergio Ghiotto	7									0
	(Netherlands) Ross Zwolsman						7				0
	(Algeria) Nassim Sidi Said	Ret	9	12	Ret	8					0
	(Italy) Andrea Tiso	8				12					0
	(Italy) Gianpiero Negrotti	11	12	Ret	11	13	22		9	Ret	0
	(Malaysia) Rizal Ramli						12				0
	(Italy) Bonifacio Gaetani								13	13	0
	(Japan) Sakon Yamamoto						13				0
	(Italy) Enzo Stentella	14	17								0
	(Italy) Francesco Dracone						17				0
	(Italy) Giovanni Gaetani						19				0
	(Italy) Raffaele Giammaria						23			Ret	0
	(Estonia) Tom Nemarnik						24				0
	(Italy) Ivan Bellarosa				Ret						0
	(Austria) Bernhard Auinger						Ret				0
	(Australia) Ryan Briscoe						Ret				0
Class Trofeo
1	(Italy) Carmine Tancredi	12	16	9	9	9	Ret	8	Ret	12	44
2	(Italy) Robert Bounomo	10	11	10	13	11	18	9	Ret	9	44
3	(Italy) Renato Bicciato		14	11	10	12	21	10	12		27
4	(Italy) Dino Lusuardi					10	20	DNS	10	15	20
5	(Italy) Giovanni Rambelli	Ret	13	Ret	Ret	14	Ret		11	14	14
6	(Italy) Giovanni Faraonio	13	10								12
7	(Italy) Silvio Alberti		Ret		15	15	16				12
8	(Italy) Alberto Morelli				DNS	Ret				8	9
9	(Italy) Nino Famà	9	DNS								9
10	(Italy) Ivan Bellarosa									10	4
11	(Italy) Giovanni Gaetani				14						3
12	(Italy) Emanuele Gozzo		15		Ret	DNS					2
	(Italy) Giorgio Ribaudo					16					0
	(Italy) Salvatore Cardullo				Ret						0
	(Italy) Carlo Bendinelli									Ret	0
Pos	Driver	VLL	MIS	PER	MNZ	VAR	IMO	BIN	MUG	MAG	Pts

Colour	Result
Gold	Winner
Silver	Second place
Bronze	Third place
Green	Points classification
Blue	Non-points classification
Blue	Non-classified finish (NC)
Purple	Retired, not classified (Ret)
Red	Did not qualify (DNQ)
Red	Did not pre-qualify (DNPQ)
Black	Disqualified (DSQ)
White	Did not start (DNS)
White	Withdrew (WD)
White	Race cancelled (C)
Blank	Did not practice (DNP)
Blank	Did not arrive (DNA)
Blank	Excluded (EX)

**Bold** – Pole
Italics – Fastest Lap
