= Andreas Zuber =

Austrian-Emirati motor racing driver

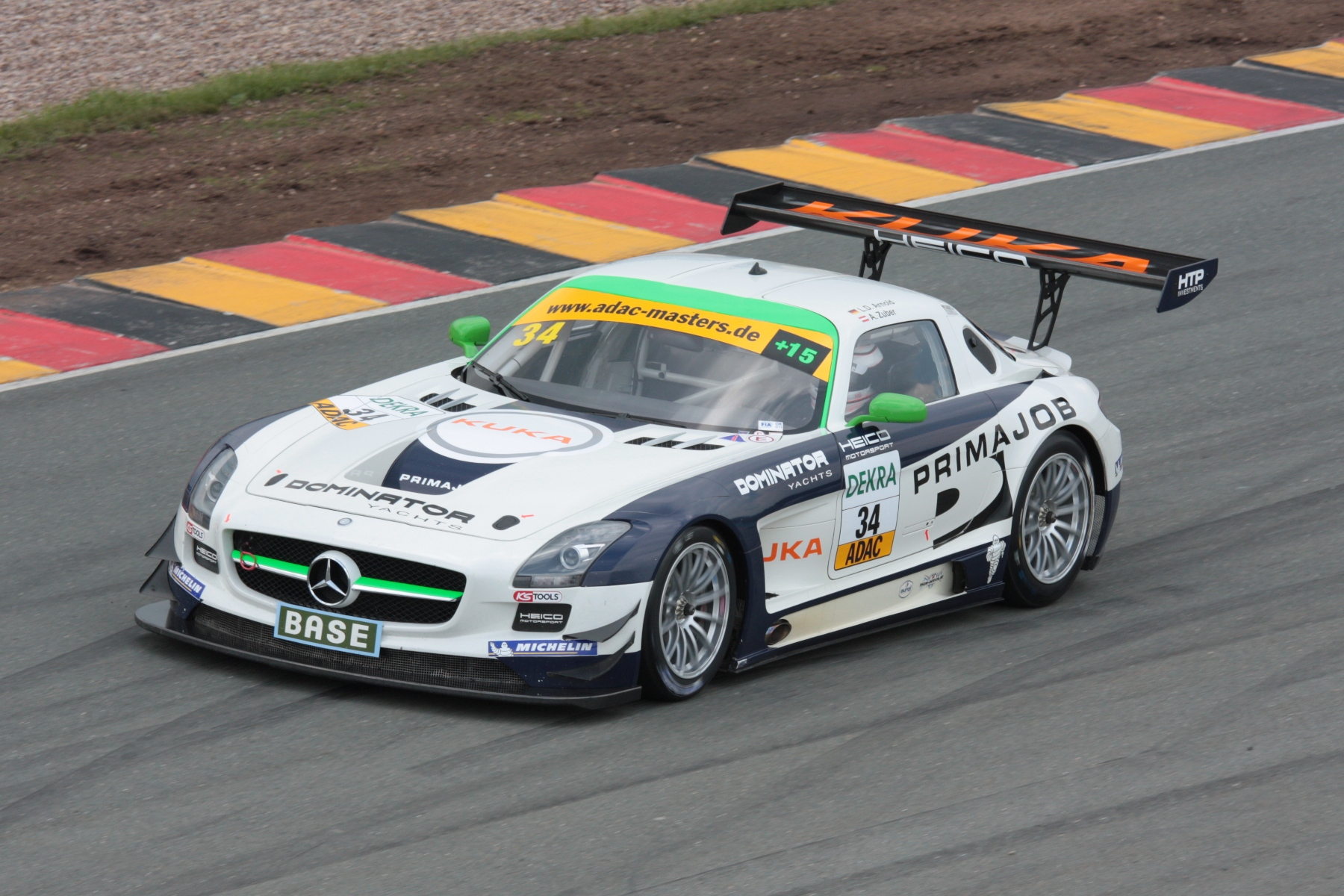
- Zuber in 2011
- Nationality: (Austria) Austrian
- Born: 9 October 1983 (age 43) Judenburg, Austria
- Categorisation: FIA Gold

Previous series
- 2008–09 2008 2006–09 2005 2003–04 2001–02 2001–02 2000: GP2 Asia Series; Superleague Formula; GP2 Series; Formula Renault 3.5 Series; Formula 3 Euro Series; Eurocup Formula Renault 2.0; FR 2.0 Germany; Formula König

Andreas "Andi" Zuber (born 9 October 1983 in Judenburg, Austria) is a former motor racing driver. An Austrian by birth, he is based in Dubai and once raced under a licence issued by the United Arab Emirates.

== Career ==
=== Formula König ===
Despite beginning his karting career in 1998, 2000 saw his debut in the Formula König championship with Team Böhm Sport. Zuber finished twelfth in the championship with 39 points.

=== Formula Renault ===
The following season, Zuber competed in both the Formula Renault 2.0 Germany and Eurocup Formula Renault 2.0 championships for Motopark Academy. He finished sixth in the German series standings. In the Eurocup, he took 54th place in the championship, with a best finish of seventeenth at the A1-Ring.

For 2002, Zuber remained in the German championship with Motopark Academy. He finished second behind Dutch driver Ferdinand Kool in final standings. Also he was a guest driver at the Oschersleben round of the Eurocup.

=== Formula Three ===
Zuber moved on to new-for-2003 Formula 3 Euro Series with Team Rosberg. He finished in 24th place in the standings with two points scored for seventh place in the first race at Le Mans.

Zuber continued in the F3 Euroseries in 2004 with Team Rosberg, finishing 21st without scoring a point, with a ninth place at Brno being his best result.

=== Formula Renault 3.5 Series ===
Zuber drove for Carlin Motorsport in the Formula Renault 3.5 Series in 2005, finishing sixth in the championship with one win at Estoril and pole position at Valencia apiece.

=== GP2 Series ===
Zuber switched to the GP2 Series for 2006 for the new Trident Racing team, where he partnered Gianmaria Bruni. After a slow start to his championship, he took his first race victory in the formula at the penultimate race meeting of the season at the Istanbul Park track, in which he was the only driver to hold off Lewis Hamilton, after the eventual champion spun early in the race but climbed back up to second position. This win complemented Bruni's two triumphs earlier in the year and established Zuber in fourteenth position in the championship.

Zuber moved to iSport International for 2007, where he was paired with Timo Glock. He took a perfect result of pole position, win and fastest lap at the Silverstone feature race, but his overall season was inconsistent and he finished ninth in the championship, compared to Glock's championship-winning campaign. The team-mates also collided with one another when accelerating away from the grid at the start of the Magny-Cours feature race, after starting from the front row.

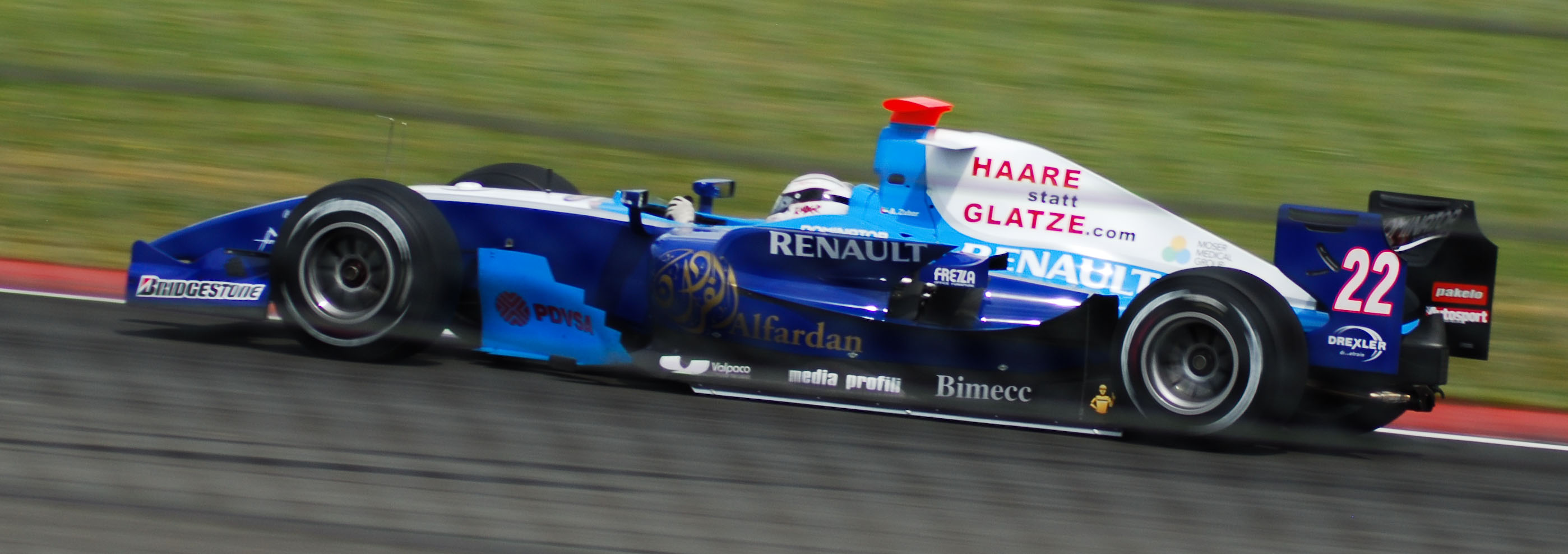
Zuber at Silverstone in 2008.

For 2008, Zuber switched to the Piquet Sports team alongside Pastor Maldonado. Four podium finishes saw him repeat his ninth place in the championship of the previous year, but he failed to achieve a race victory for the first time in the category. He was also outperformed by Maldonado, who finished fifth overall with almost double the number of points. He was not helped by failing to score any points in the final seven races of the season, a run which included disqualification from third place at the Spa-Francorchamps for a technical infringement that both he and the team considered to be particularly unfair. Zuber also drove in the first two rounds of the 2008–09 GP2 Asia Series season for the FMS International team, after which he was replaced by Rodolfo González.

Zuber returned to FMS for the 2009 GP2 Series season, where he was partnered by Luiz Razia. Despite scoring more podium finishes, the year was unstable off-track: first Giancarlo Fisichella's stake in the team was bought back by the Coloni family, its original founder and owner; then the outfit missed the eighth round of the championship after its cars were impounded as a result of court proceedings initiated by driver Andy Soucek, who had briefly been employed by FMS. Zuber eventually wound up in thirteenth place overall.

=== Superleague Formula ===
Zuber has also represented Al Ain in the Superleague Formula, a championship in which the cars represent different football teams.

== Racing record ==
=== Career summary ===
Season	Series	Team	Races	Wins	Poles	F.Laps	Podiums	Points	Position
2000	Formula König	Böhm Motorsport	8	0	0	0	0	39	12th
2001	Formula Renault 2000 Eurocup	Motopark Academy	4	0	0	0	0	0	NC
2001	Formula Renault 2.0 Germany	Motopark Academy	8	0	0	0	0	81	6th
2002	Formula Renault 2000 Eurocup	Motopark Academy	1	0	0	0	0	0	NC
2002	Formula Renault 2.0 Germany	Motopark Academy	14	0	0	0	2	120	11th
2002	Italian Formula Three Championship	Team Ghinzani	1	0	1	0	0	3	12th
2003	Formula 3 Euro Series	Team Rosberg	20	0	0	0	0	2	24th
2003	Masters of Formula 3	Team Rosberg	1	0	0	0	0	0	26th
2004	Formula 3 Euro Series	Team Rosberg	20	0	0	0	0	0	NC
2004	Masters of Formula 3	Team Rosberg	1	0	0	0	0	0	25th
2004	Spanish Formula Three Championship - Winter Series	?	2	0	0	0	1	0	NC
2004	Central European Zone Championship - Formula 3	?	?	?	?	?	?	?	**1st**
2005	Formula Renault 3.5 Series	Carlin Motorsport	16	1	1	4	4	73	6th
2006	GP2 Series	Trident Racing	21	1	0	1	1	12	14th
2007	GP2 Series	iSport International	20	1	1	2	3	30	9th
2007	Formula One	Super Aguri F1 Team	Test Driver						
2008	GP2 Series	Piquet Sports	20	0	0	2	4	32	9th
2008	Superleague Formula	Al Ain Azerti Motorsport	4	0	0	0	0	244	12th
2008-09	GP2 Asia Series	Fisichella Motor Sport International	3	0	0	0	0	0	NC
2009	GP2 Series	Fisichella Motor Sport International	18	0	0	0	3	21	13th
2010	FIA GT1 World Championship	Phoenix Racing / Carsport	4	1	1	1	2	26	23rd
2010	EuroBOSS Series	Zele Racing	2	2	2	2	2	40	**3rd**
2011	FIA GT1 World Championship	Exim Bank Team China	4	0	0	0	2	19	20th
2011	ADAC GT Masters	Primajob Team Heico	16	0	0	0	3	104	6th
2012	FIA GT1 World Championship	Exim Bank Team China	9	0	0	0	0	1	22nd
2012	Dubai 24 Hour	Team Heico	1	0	0	0	1	0	**2nd**
2013	FIA GT Series	Sébastien Loeb Racing	12	0	0	0	2	61	8th
2013	Dubai 24 Hour	MRS GT-Racing	1	0	0	0	0	0	12th

=== Complete Formula Renault 2.0 Germany results ===
(key) (Races in bold indicate pole position) (Races in italics indicate fastest lap)

Year	Entrant	1	2	3	4	5	6	7	8	9	10	11	12	13	14	DC	Points
2001	Motopark Oschersleben	OSC; 5	LAU; Ret	SAL; 7	NÜR; 7	LAU; 12	HOC; 19	NÜR; 7	OSC; 9							6th	81
2002	Motopark Oschersleben	OSC; 1 Ret	OSC; 2; 15	HOC; 1; 5	HOC; 2; 3	LAU; 1; 6	LAU; 2; 15	NÜR; 1; 10	NÜR; 2 Ret	SAL; 1; 14	SAL; 2 Ret	NÜR; 1; 6	NÜR; 2 Ret	OSC; 1; 2	OSC; 2 DNS	11th	120

=== Complete Formula Renault 2.0 Eurocup results ===
(key) (Races in bold indicate pole position) (Races in italics indicate fastest lap)

Year	Entrant	1	2	3	4	5	6	7	8	9	10	DC	Points
2001	Motopark Academy	MNZ; Ret	BRN; Ret	MAG	SIL	ZOL	HUN	A1R; 17	NÜR; 20	JAR	EST	54th	0
2002	Motopark Academy	MAG	SIL	JAR	AND	OSC; Ret	SPA	IMO	DON	EST		NC	0

=== Complete Italian Formula Three Championship results ===
(key)

Year	Entrant	Chassis	Engine	1	2	3	4	5	6	7	8	9	DC	Points
2002	Team Ghinzani	Dallara F302	Mugen-Honda	VLL	MIS	PER	MNZ	VAR	IMO	BIN	MUG	**MAG**; 4	13th	3

=== Complete Formula 3 Euro Series results ===
(key)

Year	Entrant	Chassis	Engine	1	2	3	4	5	6	7	8	9	10	11	12	13	14	15	16	17	18	19	20	DC	Points
2003	Team Rosberg	Dallara F303/006	Spiess-Opel	HOC1; 1; 17	HOC1; 2; 9	ADR; 1; 18	ADR; 2; 23	PAU; 1; 20	PAU; 2 DNS	NOR; 1 Ret	NOR; 2; 13	LMS; 1; 7	LMS; 2; 13	NÜR; 1; 22	NÜR; 2 Ret	A1R; 1; 9	A1R; 2 Ret	ZAN; 1; 13	ZAN; 2; 12	HOC2; 1 Ret	HOC2; 2; 21	MAG; 1; 25	MAG; 2 Ret	24th	2
2004	Team Rosberg	Dallara F303/005	Spiess-Opel	HOC1; 1; 19	HOC1; 2 Ret	EST; 1; 21	EST; 2 Ret	ADR; 1; 20	ADR; 1 Ret	PAU; 1 Ret	PAU; 2 Ret	NOR; 1 Ret	NOR; 1 Ret	MAG; 1; 20	MAG; 2 Ret	NÜR; 1; 19	NÜR; 2; 16	ZAN; 1; 23	ZAN; 2 Ret	BRN; 1; 12	BRN; 2; 9	HOC2; 1 Ret	HOC2; 2; 10	21st	0

=== Complete Formula Renault 3.5 Series results ===
(key) (Races in bold indicate pole position) (Races in italics indicate fastest lap)

Year	Entrant	1	2	3	4	5	6	7	8	9	10	11	12	13	14	15	16	17	DC	Points
2005	Carlin Motorsport	ZOL; 1; 2	ZOL; 2; 2	MON; 1 DNS	VAL; 1 Ret	**VAL**; **2**; 10	LMS; 1; 7	LMS; 2; 8	BIL; 1; 22	BIL; 2; 16	OSC; 1; 3	OSC; 2; 10	DON; 1; 19	DON; 2 Ret	EST; 1; 1	EST; 2; 7	MNZ; 1 Ret	MNZ; 2; 5	6th	73

=== Complete GP2 Series results ===
(key) (Races in bold indicate pole position) (Races in italics indicate fastest lap)

Year	Entrant	1	2	3	4	5	6	7	8	9	10	11	12	13	14	15	16	17	18	19	20	21	DC	Points
2006	Trident Racing	VAL; FEA; Ret	VAL; SPR; 13	IMO; FEA; Ret	IMO; SPR; 8	NÜR; FEA; 14	NÜR; SPR; Ret	CAT; FEA; Ret	CAT; SPR; 11	MON; FEA; 5	SIL; FEA; Ret	SIL; SPR; Ret	MAG; FEA; Ret	MAG; SPR; 18	HOC; FEA; Ret	HOC; SPR; 14	HUN; FEA; 14	HUN; SPR; 9	IST; FEA; 7	IST; SPR; 1	MNZ; FEA; Ret	MNZ; SPR; NC	14th	12
2007	iSport International	BHR; FEA; 3	BHR; SPR; Ret	CAT; FEA; DNS	CAT; SPR; 9	MON; FEA; Ret	MAG; FEA; Ret	MAG; SPR; 15	**SIL**; **FEA**; 1	SIL; SPR; 6	NÜR; FEA; Ret	NÜR; SPR; 21	HUN; FEA; 3	HUN; SPR; 6	IST; FEA; Ret	IST; SPR; 14	MNZ; FEA; Ret	MNZ; SPR; 5	SPA; FEA; 18	SPA; SPR; 12	VAL; FEA; 12	VAL; SPR; 12	9th	30
2008	Piquet Sports	CAT; FEA; 3	CAT; SPR; Ret	IST; FEA; 3	IST; SPR; Ret	MON; FEA; 11	MON; SPR; 17	MAG; FEA; 5	MAG; SPR; 8	SIL; FEA; 7	SIL; SPR; 11	HOC; FEA; 11^{†}	HOC; SPR; 2	HUN; FEA; 2	HUN; SPR; 7	VAL; FEA; Ret	VAL; SPR; Ret	SPA; FEA; DSQ	SPA; SPR; Ret	MNZ; FEA; Ret	MNZ; SPR; 10		9th	32
2009	FMSI	CAT; FEA; Ret	CAT; SPR; Ret	MON; FEA; 3	MON; SPR; 5	IST; FEA; 9	IST; SPR; 19	SIL; FEA; 8	SIL; SPR; 2	NÜR; FEA; 3	NÜR; SPR; Ret	HUN; FEA; Ret	HUN; SPR; 17										13th	21
2009	PartyPokerRacing.com SC													VAL; FEA; 16	VAL; SPR; Ret	SPA; FEA	SPA; SPR	MNZ; FEA; 12	MNZ; SPR; Ret	ALG; FEA; 8	ALG; SPR; 12		13th	21

==== Complete GP2 Asia Series results ====
(key) (Races in bold indicate pole position) (Races in italics indicate fastest lap)

Year	Entrant	1	2	3	4	5	6	7	8	9	10	11	12	DC	Points
2008–09	Fisichella Motor Sport	SHI; FEA; Ret	SHI; SPR; Ret	DUB; FEA; Ret	DUB; SPR; C	BHR1; FEA	BHR1; SPR	LSL; FEA	LSL; SPR	SEP; FEA	SEP; SPR	BHR2; FEA	BHR2; SPR	NC	0

=== Superleague Formula ===
Year	Team	1	2	3	4	5	6	7	8	9	10	11	12	Rank	Pts
2008	Al Ain Azerti Motorsport	DON; 1; 6	DON; 2; 15	NÜR; 1; 11	NÜR; 2; 11	ZOL; 1	ZOL; 2	EST; 1	EST; 2	VLL; 1	VLL; 2	JER; 1	JER; 2	12th*	244*

- * Al Ain FC overall standing. There is no drivers' championship in the Superleague Formula.

=== FIA GT competition results ===
==== GT1 World Championship results ====
Year	Team	Car	1	2	3	4	5	6	7	8	9	10	11	12	13	14	15	16	17	18	19	20	Pos	Points
2010	Phoenix Racing/Carsport	Corvette C6.R	ABU; QR; 1	ABU; CR; 2	SIL; QR; 11	SIL; CR; Ret	BRN; QR	BRN; CR	PRI; QR	PRI; CR	SPA; QR	SPA; CR	NÜR; QR	NÜR; CR	ALG; QR	ALG; CR	NAV; QR	NAV; CR	INT; QR	INT; CR	SAN; QR	SAN; CR	23rd	26
2011	Exim Bank Team China	Corvette C6.R	ABU; QR	ABU; CR	ZOL; QR	ZOL; CR	ALG; QR	ALG; CR	SAC; QR	SAC; CR	SIL; QR; 3	SIL; CR; 3	NAV; QR	NAV; CR	PRI; QR; Ret	PRI; CR; Ret	ORD; QR	ORD; CR	BEI; QR	BEI; CR	SAN; QR	SAN; CR	20th	19
2012	Valmon Racing Team Russia	Aston Martin DBRS9	NOG; QR; 13	NOG; CR; 13	ZOL; QR; Ret	ZOL; CR; 15	NAV; QR; 15	NAV; QR; 13															27th	1
2012	Exim Bank Team China	Porsche 911 GT3-R							SVK; QR; DNS	SVK; CR; DNS	ALG; QR; 9	ALG; CR; 10											27th	1
2012	Sunred	Ford GT GT3											SVK; QR; DNS	SVK; CR; Ret	MOS; QR	MOS; CR	NUR; QR	NUR; CR	DON; QR	DON; CR			27th	1

==== FIA GT Series results ====
Year	Team	Car	Class	1	2	3	4	5	6	7	8	9	10	11	12	Pos.	Points
2013	Sébastien Loeb Racing	McLaren MP4-12C GT3	Pro	NOG; QR; 10	NOG; CR; 11	ZOL; QR; 4	ZOL; CR; 4	ZAN; QR; 6	ZAN; QR; 15	SVK; QR; 4	SVK; CR; 7	NAV; QR; 5	NAV; CR; 2	BAK; QR; Ret	BAK; CR; Ret	8th	61
