= Gregory Franchi =

Belgian racing driver

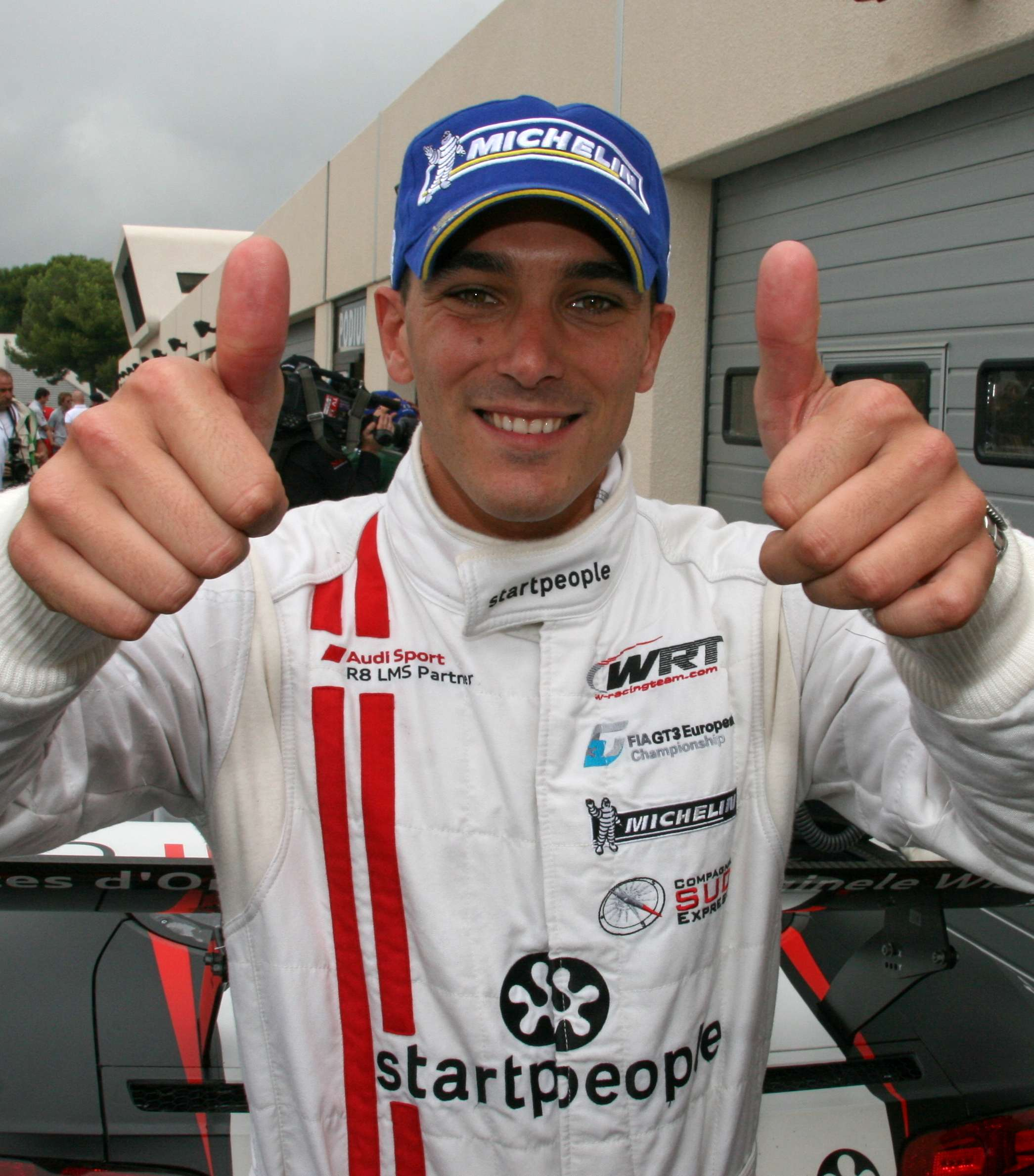
- Nationality: (Belgium) Belgian
- Born: 6 April 1982 (age 44) Flémalle (Belgium)

FFSA GT Championship career
- Debut season: 2010
- Current team: WRT
- Categorisation: FIA Silver
- Car number: 37
- Starts: 6
- Wins: 0
- Poles: 0
- Fastest laps: 0

Previous series
- 2008 2007–08 2007 2006 2004–05 2003–04 2003 2002 2001–02 2001: Belcar; FIA GT; Eurocup Mégane Trophy; Formula Renault 3.5 Series; Formula 3 Euro Series; British Formula 3 Italian Formula Three; Formula Renault 2.0 Italy; Eurocup Formula Renault 2.0; Formula Ford France

Gregory "Greg" Franchi (born 6 April 1982, in Flémalle) is a Belgian former racing driver.

== Career ==
=== Karting ===
Franchi began his karting career in 2000, with the 36th place in European Championship Formula A.

=== Formula Ford ===
Franchi made his debut in his formula racing career in French Formula Ford championship, where he finished as runner-up.

=== Formula Renault ===
After racing at Autódromo do Estoril in the Formula Renault 2000 Eurocup in 2001, he remained for 2002, but switched to ADM Junior Team. He finished 39th without scoring a point. He also participated in three races of the Italian Formula Renault Championship with the same team.

=== Formula Three ===
In 2003, Franchi stepped up to the Italian Formula Three Championship with the Lucidi Motors team. He finished third in the standings after taking four podium places. He also appeared as a guest driver at Circuit de Spa-Francorchamps in British Formula 3.

Franchi moved to Signature and the Formula 3 Euro Series in 2004, finishing the season in 29th position. He remained in series for the following season, but switched to the Prema Powerteam. He improved to seventeenth place in the standings and scored four points.

=== Formula Renault 3.5 Series ===
In 2006, Franchi stepped up to the Formula Renault 3.5 Series with Prema Powerteam. He took ten points, finishing in third place at the Monaco race that was part of the Formula One Grand Prix weekend. It was single points for him and he received 25th final position in standings.

=== Touring car and GT racing ===
In 2007, Franchi moved to touring car and GT racing, competing in series such as Eurocup Mégane Trophy, FIA GT, Belcar and FFSA GT Championship.

== Racing record ==
=== Career summary ===
Season	Series	Team	Races	Wins	Poles	F/Laps	Podiums	Points	Position
2001	Formula Ford France		?	?	?	?	?	165	**2nd**
2001	Formula Renault 2000 Eurocup		1	0	0	0	0	0	72nd
2002	Formula Renault 2000 Eurocup	ADM Junior Team	6	0	0	0	0	0	39th
2002	Italian Formula Renault Championship	ADM Junior Team	3	0	0	0	0	0	NC
2003	Italian Formula Three	Lucidi Motors	9	0	0	1	4	78	**3rd**
2003	British Formula 3 Championship	Lucidi Motors	2	0	0	0	0	N/A	NC†
2004	Formula 3 Euro Series	Opel Team Signature	17	0	0	0	0	0	29th
2004	Masters of Formula 3	Opel Team Signature	1	0	0	0	0	N/A	29th
2004	British Formula 3 Championship	Opel Team Signature	2	0	0	0	0	N/A	NC†
2005	Formula 3 Euro Series	Prema Powerteam	20	0	0	0	0	11	17th
2005	Masters of Formula 3	Prema Powerteam	1	0	0	0	0	N/A	21st
2006	Formula Renault 3.5 Series	Prema Powerteam	17	0	0	0	1	10	25th
2007	Eurocup Mégane Trophy	Equipe Verschuur	8	1	0	2	1	37	11th
2007	Le Mans Series	Aston Martin Larbre	5	0	0	0	0	14	11th
2007	FIA GT - GT1	Luc Alphand Aventures	1	0	0	0	0	7	20th
2008	Belcar	Equipe Verschuur	11	3	?	5	?	117	4th
2008	FIA GT - GT1	Larbre Competition	6	0	0	0	0	10	14th
2010	FFSA GT Championship	WRT	13	0	0	0	2	86	6th
2010	FIA GT3 European Championship	Saintéloc-Phoenix Racing	6	0	0	0	1	24	20th
2010	FIA GT3 European Championship	Belgian Audi Club	2	0	0	0	0	24	20th
2011	Blancpain Endurance Series - GT3 Pro	WRT Belgian Audi Club	5	1	0	0	2	89.5	**1st**
2011	FIA GT3 European Championship	Belgian Audi Club Team WRT	12	2	0	0	3	75	9th
2012	Blancpain Endurance Series - Pro	Vita4One Racing Team	6	0	1	0	2	53	8th
2012	Baku City Challenge	Vita4One Team Italy	1	0	0	0	0	N/A	8th
2013	Blancpain Endurance Series - Pro	Vita4One Racing Team	4	0	0	0	0	11	24th

=== Complete Formula 3 Euro Series results ===
(key) (Races in bold indicate pole position) (Races in italics indicate fastest lap)

Year	Entrant	Chassis	Engine	1	2	3	4	5	6	7	8	9	10	11	12	13	14	15	16	17	18	19	20	DC	Points
2004	Opel Team Signature	Dallara F302/067	Spiess-Opel	HOC; 1; 22	HOC; 2; 17	EST; 1; 23	EST; 2; 19	ADR; 1; 16	ADR; 1; 15	PAU; 1 Ret	PAU; 2 Ret	NOR; 1 Ret	NOR; 1; 14	MAG; 1; 17	MAG; 2; 20	NÜR; 1; 21	NÜR; 2; 17	ZAN; 1 Ret	ZAN; 2; 21	BRN; 1	BRN; 2	HOC; 3 Ret	HOC; 4 DNS	29th	0
2005	Prema Powerteam	Dallara F305/004	Spiess-Opel	HOC; 1; 13	HOC; 2; 19	PAU; 1; 15	PAU; 2 Ret	SPA; 1 DSQ	SPA; 2; 7	MON; 1 Ret	MON; 2 Ret	OSC; 1; 18	OSC; 2; 18	NOR; 1 Ret	NOR; 2; 12	NÜR; 1; 8	NÜR; 2; 9	ZAN; 1; 4	ZAN; 2; 7	LAU; 1; 13	LAU; 2; 7	HOC; 3; 10	HOC; 4; 12	17th	11

=== Complete Formula Renault 3.5 Series results ===
(key) (Races in bold indicate pole position) (Races in italics indicate fastest lap)

Year	Entrant	1	2	3	4	5	6	7	8	9	10	11	12	13	14	15	16	17	DC	Points
2006	Prema Powerteam	ZOL; 1; 15	ZOL; 2; 12	MON; 1; 3	IST; 1 Ret	IST; 2; 19	MIS; 1; 11	MIS; 2 Ret	SPA; 1; 18	SPA; 2; 15	NÜR; 1; 18	NÜR; 2; 16	DON; 1; 23	DON; 2; 15	LMS; 1; 23	LMS; 2 Ret	CAT; 1; 17	CAT; 2 Ret	25th	10
