= Philip Andersen =

Danish racing driver (born 1980)

Philip Andersen (born 15 November 1980) is a Danish race car driver who competed in the Danish Touring Car Championship from 2003 until 2004. For the two years before that, he drove in Formula Renault 2000 Eurocup. As of 2006, he drove in the Le Mans Series Championship in LMP1 for the team Zytek; he is the driver N°3 of the car n°2 (a Zytec 06S).

== 24 Hours of Le Mans results ==
Year	Team	Co-Drivers	Car	Class	Laps	Pos.	Class Pos.
2006	(United Kingdom) Zytek Engineering (Denmark) Team Essex Invest	(Denmark) Casper Elgaard (Denmark) John Nielsen	Zytek 06S	LMP1	269	NC	NC
