= 2006 Masters of Formula 3 =

Race details
Date	6 August 2006
Official name	BP Ultimate Masters of Formula 3
Location	Circuit Park Zandvoort, Netherlands
Course	4.307 km (2.676 mi)
Distance	25 laps, 107.675 km (66.906 mi)

Pole
Driver	(Netherlands) Giedo van der Garde	ASM Formule 3
Time	1:32.920

Fastest Lap
Driver	(Netherlands) Giedo van der Garde	ASM Formule 3
Time	1:34.558 (on lap 14 of 25)

Podium
First	(United Kingdom) Paul di Resta	ASM Formule 3
Second	(Netherlands) Giedo van der Garde	ASM Formule 3
Third	(Switzerland) Sébastien Buemi	ASL Mücke Motorsport

The 2006 BP Ultimate Masters of Formula 3 was the sixteenth Masters of Formula 3 race held at Circuit Park Zandvoort on 6 August 2006. It was won by Paul di Resta, for ASM Formule 3.

== Drivers and teams ==
2006 Entry List
Team	No	Driver	Chassis	Engine	Main series
(France) ASM Formule 3	1	(United Kingdom) Paul di Resta	Dallara F305	Mercedes	Formula 3 Euro Series
(France) ASM Formule 3	2	(Germany) Sebastian Vettel	Dallara F305	Mercedes	Formula 3 Euro Series
(France) ASM Formule 3	3	(Japan) Kamui Kobayashi	Dallara F305	Mercedes	Formula 3 Euro Series
(France) ASM Formule 3	4	(Netherlands) Giedo van der Garde	Dallara F306	Mercedes	Formula 3 Euro Series
(United Kingdom) Räikkönen Robertson Racing	5	(United Kingdom) Mike Conway	Dallara F306	Mercedes	British Formula 3
(United Kingdom) Räikkönen Robertson Racing	6	(Brazil) Bruno Senna	Dallara F306	Mercedes	British Formula 3
(United Kingdom) Räikkönen Robertson Racing	7	(United Kingdom) Stephen Jelley	Dallara F305	Mercedes	British Formula 3
(United Kingdom) Manor Motorsport	8	(Argentina) Esteban Guerrieri	Dallara F305	Mercedes	Formula 3 Euro Series
(United Kingdom) Manor Motorsport	9	(Japan) Kohei Hirate	Dallara F305	Mercedes	Formula 3 Euro Series
(United Kingdom) Manor Motorsport	10	(Japan) Kazuki Nakajima	Dallara F305	Mercedes	Formula 3 Euro Series
(United Kingdom) Carlin Motorsport	11	(Germany) Maro Engel	Dallara F305	Mugen-Honda	British Formula 3
(United Kingdom) Carlin Motorsport	12	(United Kingdom) Oliver Jarvis	Dallara F305	Mugen-Honda	British Formula 3
(United Kingdom) Carlin Motorsport	14	(Brazil) Mario Moraes	Dallara F305	Mugen-Honda	British Formula 3
(United Kingdom) Carlin Motorsport	15	(Denmark) Christian Bakkerud	Dallara F305	Mugen-Honda	British Formula 3
(France) Signature-Plus	16	(France) Guillaume Moreau	Dallara F305	Mercedes	Formula 3 Euro Series
(France) Signature-Plus	17	(France) Romain Grosjean	Dallara F305	Mercedes	Formula 3 Euro Series
(France) Signature-Plus	18	(Germany) Tim Sandtler	Dallara F305	Mercedes	Formula 3 Euro Series
(France) Signature-Plus	19	(United States) Charlie Kimball	Dallara F306	Mercedes	Formula 3 Euro Series
(United Kingdom) Fortec Motorsport	20	(Netherlands) Yelmer Buurman	Dallara F305	Mercedes	British Formula 3
(United Kingdom) Fortec Motorsport	21	(Norway) Stian Sørlie	Dallara F305	Mercedes	Formula Renault 2.0 UK
(Switzerland) Jo Zeller Racing	23	(Germany) Peter Elkmann	Dallara F306	Opel	Formula 3 Euro Series
(Austria) HBR Motorsport	24	(United States) Richard Antinucci	Dallara F305	Mercedes	Formula 3 Euro Series
(Belgium) JB Motorsport	25	(China) Ho-Pin Tung	Lola B06/30	Opel	Recaro Formel 3 Cup
(Belgium) JB Motorsport	26	(Netherlands) Ferdinand Kool	Lola B06/30	Opel	Recaro Formel 3 Cup
(United Kingdom) Hitech Racing	27	(United Kingdom) James Jakes	Dallara F305	Mercedes	British Formula 3
(United Kingdom) Hitech Racing	28	(United Kingdom) James Walker	Dallara F305	Mercedes	British Formula 3
(United Kingdom) Hitech Racing	30	(Mexico) Salvador Durán	Dallara F305	Mercedes	British Formula 3
(Germany) ASL Mücke Motorsport	31	(United States) Jonathan Summerton	Dallara F305	Mercedes	Formula 3 Euro Series
(Germany) ASL Mücke Motorsport	32	(Switzerland) Sébastien Buemi	Dallara F305	Mercedes	Formula 3 Euro Series
(Czech Republic) Team I.S.R.	33	(Czech Republic) Filip Salaquarda	Dallara F306	Opel	Formula 3 Euro Series
(Belgium) Bas Leinders Junior Racing Team	34	(Belgium) Michael Herck	Dallara F306	Mercedes	Formula 3 Euro Series
(Italy) Prema Powerteam	35	(Spain) Alejandro Núñez	Dallara F306	Mercedes	Formula 3 Euro Series
(Italy) Prema Powerteam	36	(Republic of Ireland) Ronayne O'Mahony	Dallara F305	Mercedes	Formula 3 Euro Series
(Italy) Prema Powerteam	37	(Italy) Paolo Nocera	Dallara F306	Mercedes	Formula 3 Euro Series
(Switzerland) Swiss Racing Team	39	(Sweden) Max Nilsson	Dallara F305	Opel	Recaro Formel 3 Cup
(Netherlands) Van Amersfoort Racing	41	(Netherlands) Dominick Muermans	Dallara F306	Opel	Recaro Formel 3 Cup
(Netherlands) Van Amersfoort Racing	42	(South Korea) Récardo Bruins	Dallara F305	Opel	Recaro Formel 3 Cup
(United Kingdom) Promatecme UK	43	(Lebanon) Alex Khateeb	Lola B05/30	Mugen-Honda	British Formula 3

== Classification ==
=== Race ===
2006 BP Ultimate Masters of Formula 3 Race Result
Pos	No	Driver	Team	Laps	Time/Retired	Grid
1	1	(United Kingdom) Paul di Resta	ASM Formule 3	25	39:47.771	2
2	4	(Netherlands) Giedo van der Garde	ASM Formule 3	25	+0.476	1
3	32	(Switzerland) Sébastien Buemi	ASL Mücke Motorsport	25	+4.567	3
4	9	(Japan) Kohei Hirate	Manor Motorsport	25	+10.931	4
5	17	(France) Romain Grosjean	Signature Plus	25	+11.858	6
6	2	(Germany) Sebastian Vettel	ASM Formule 3	25	+12.381	5
7	6	(Brazil) Bruno Senna	Räikkönen Robertson Racing	25	+13.387	7
8	12	(United Kingdom) Oliver Jarvis	Carlin Motorsport	25	+13.814	9
9	19	(United States) Charlie Kimball	Signature Plus	25	+16.779	16
10	31	(United States) Jonathan Summerton	ASL Mücke Motorsport	25	+17.485	8
11	3	(Japan) Kamui Kobayashi	ASM Formule 3	25	+20.225	10
12	24	(United States) Richard Antinucci	HBR Motorsport	25	+21.135	17
13	34	(Belgium) Michael Herck	Bas Leinders Junior Racing Team	25	+21.672	11
14	16	(France) Guillaume Moreau	Signature Plus	25	+22.869	15
15	11	(Germany) Maro Engel	Carlin Motorsport	25	+23.648	14
16	15	(Denmark) Christian Bakkerud	Carlin Motorsport	25	+24.637	20
17	35	(Spain) Alejandro Núñez	Prema Powerteam	25	+37.052	18
18	7	(United Kingdom) Stephen Jelley	Räikkönen Robertson Racing	25	+37.355	22
19	20	(Netherlands) Yelmer Buurman	Fortec Motorsport	25	+38.236	19
20	18	(Germany) Tim Sandtler	Signature Plus	25	+43.157	23
21	8	(Argentina) Esteban Guerrieri	Manor Motorsport	25	+44.964	29
22	27	(United Kingdom) James Jakes	Hitech Racing	25	+45.350	26
23	30	(Mexico) Salvador Durán	Hitech Racing	25	+48.901	25
24	36	(Republic of Ireland) Ronayne O'Mahony	Prema Powerteam	25	+50.472	27
25	23	(Germany) Peter Elkmann	Jo Zeller Racing	25	+51.172	30
26	10	(Japan) Kazuki Nakajima	Manor Motorsport	25	+52.075	13
27	33	(Czech Republic) Filip Salaquarda	Team I.S.R.	25	+55.958	32
28	21	(Norway) Stian Sørlie	Fortec Motorsport	25	+1:01.558	34
29	37	(Italy) Paolo Nocera	Prema Powerteam	25	+1:06.678	28
30	14	(Brazil) Mario Moraes	Carlin Motorsport	25	+1:16.929	35
31	42	(South Korea) Récardo Bruins	Van Amersfoort Racing	25	+1:18.123	33
32	41	(Netherlands) Dominick Muermans	Van Amersfoort Racing	25	+1:18.934	36
33	39	(Sweden) Max Nilsson	Swiss Racing Team	25	+1:25.648	38
34	43	(Lebanon) Alex Khateeb	Promatecme UK	25	+1:26.151	
Ret	25	(China) Ho-Pin Tung	JB Motorsport	20	Retired	24
Ret	5	(United Kingdom) Mike Conway	Räikkönen Robertson Racing	5	Retired	12
Ret	28	(United Kingdom) James Walker	Hitech Racing	2	Retired	21
DNS	26	(Netherlands) Ferdinand Kool	JB Motorsport	0	Did not start	31
Fastest lap: Giedo van der Garde, 1:34.558, 163.810 km/h (101.787 mph) on lap 14

== See also ==
- 2006 Formula 3 Euro Series season
- 2006 British Formula 3 season
