= 2025 24 Hours of Nürburgring =

Endurance motor race in Germany

(Germany) 24 Hours of Nurburgring 2025
Event information
- Round 2 of 5 in the 2025 Intercontinental GT Challenge
- Date: 19–22 June 2025
- Location: Nürburg, Rhineland-Palatinate, Germany
- Venue: Nürburgring
- Duration: 24 Hours
- Weather: Fine

Results
- Laps completed: 141
- Distance: 3,578.3 km (2,223.5 mi)

Pole position
- Time: 8:12.741
- Team: (Germany) Manthey Racing
- Drivers: (France) Kévin Estre

Winners
- Time: 24:02:40.104
- Team: (Germany) Rowe Racing
- Drivers: (Brazil) Augusto Farfus (Finland) Jesse Krohn (Italy) Raffaele Marciello (South Africa) Kelvin van der Linde

The 2025 Nürburgring 24 Hours (officially known as ADAC Ravenol 24h Race at the Nürburgring Nordschleife for sponsorship reasons) was the 53rd running of the Nürburgring 24 Hours, which took place over 21–22 June 2025. The event was organised by the ADAC Nordrhein in a partnership with the SRO Motorsports Group that saw the event stage the second round of the 2025 Intercontinental GT Challenge.

The Rowe Racing BMW M4 GT3, the only top-class BMW entry in the race, was classified as the race winner following a late penalty for race-long leader Manthey Racing.

== Entry list ==
No.	Entrant	Car	Class	Driver 1	Driver 2	Driver 3	Driver 4
SP 9 FIA GT3 (27 entries)
1	(Germany) Scherer Sport PHX	Audi R8 LMS Evo II	P	(Germany) Christopher Haase	(Germany) Luca Ludwig	(Germany) Markus Winkelhock	
7	(Austria) Konrad Motorsport	Lamborghini Huracán GT3 Evo	PA	(Germany) Peter Elkmann	(Bulgaria) Pavel Lefterov	(Germany) Maximilian Paul	(United States) Danny Soufi
8	(Lithuania) Juta Racing	Audi R8 LMS Evo II	PA	(Germany) Elia Erhart	(Germany) Pierre Kaffer	(Kyrgyzstan) "Selv" (Note: Veremenko is a Russian, but is competing under a German license, "Selv" and Oleg Kvitka are also Russian, but competes under a Kyrgyzstani license as Russian national emblems were banned by the FIA due to the Russian invasion of Ukraine. Mavlanov, also a Russian, competes under an Armenian licence for the same reason.)	(Germany) Alexey Veremenko
11	(Germany) SR Motorsport by Schnitzelalm	Mercedes-AMG GT3 Evo	PA	(Germany) Christopher Brück	(Germany) Jannes Fittje	(Germany) Jay Mo Härtling	(Germany) Kenneth Heyer
14	(Germany) Mercedes-AMG Team Bilstein by GetSpeed	Mercedes-AMG GT3 Evo	P	(Germany) Maro Engel	(Belgium) Maxime Martin	(Germany) Fabian Schiller	(Germany) Luca Stolz
16	(Germany) Scherer Sport PHX	Porsche 911 GT3 R (992)	P	(Switzerland) Ricardo Feller	(Switzerland) Patric Niederhauser	(France) Patrick Pilet	(Belgium) Laurens Vanthoor
17	(Germany) Mercedes-AMG Team GetSpeed	Mercedes-AMG GT3 Evo	P	(Estonia) Ralf Aron	(Austria) Lucas Auer	(United Kingdom) Adam Christodoulou	(Canada) Mikaël Grenier
27	(Germany) Red Bull Team Abt	Lamborghini Huracán GT3 Evo 2	P	(Italy) Mirko Bortolotti	(Spain) Daniel Juncadella	(South Africa) Jordan Pepper	
28	(Germany) Abt Sportsline	Lamborghini Huracán GT3 Evo 2	P	(Germany) Christian Engelhart	(Germany) Luca Engstler	(Italy) Marco Mapelli	
30	(Germany) Walkenhorst Motorsport	Aston Martin Vantage AMR GT3 Evo	Am	(Germany) Stefan Aust	(Germany) Christian Bollrath	(Germany) Jörg Breuer	(Germany) Henry Walkenhorst
33	(Germany) Falken Motorsports	Porsche 911 GT3 R (992)	P	(France) Julien Andlauer	(Germany) Nico Menzel	(Germany) Sven Müller	(Belgium) Alessio Picariello
34	(Germany) Walkenhorst Motorsport	Aston Martin Vantage AMR GT3 Evo	P	(Italy) Mattia Drudi	(Norway) Christian Krognes	(United Kingdom) David Pittard	(Denmark) Nicki Thiim
35	(Germany) Walkenhorst Motorsport	Aston Martin Vantage AMR GT3 Evo	PA	(Germany) Anders Burchardt	(Germany) Nico Hantke	(Norway) Christian Krognes	(Sweden) Oliver Söderström
37	(Germany) PROsport Racing	Aston Martin Vantage AMR GT3	PA	(Germany) Nico Bastian	(Germany) Marek Böckmann	(France) Steven Palette	
44	(Germany) Falken Motorsports	Porsche 911 GT3 R (992)	P	(France) Dorian Boccolacci	(Germany) Tim Heinemann	(Germany) Dennis Marschall	(Netherlands) Morris Schuring
45	(Japan) Realize Kondo Racing with Rinaldi	Ferrari 296 GT3	P	(Zimbabwe) Axcil Jefferies	(Germany) Felipe Fernandez Laser	(France) Thomas Neubauer	(South Africa) David Perel
48	(Germany) Black Falcon Team EAE	Porsche 911 GT3 R (992)	PA	(Netherlands) Daan Pijl	(Germany) Ben Bünnagel	(Turkey) Mustafa Mehmet Kaya	(Italy) Gabriele Piana
50	(Germany) équipe vitesse	Audi R8 LMS Evo II	Am	(Germany) Michael Heimrich	(Germany) Arno Klasen	(Italy) Lorenzo Rocco Di Torrepadula	(Sweden) Eric Ullström
54	(Italy) Dinamic GT	Porsche 911 GT3 R (992)	P	(Denmark) Bastian Buus	(Italy) Matteo Cairoli	(Netherlands) Loek Hartog	(Germany) Joel Sturm
55	(South Korea) Hankook Competition	Porsche 911 GT3 R (992)	PA	(South Korea) Roelof Bruins	(Canada) Steven Cho	(Germany) Marco Holzer	(South Korea) Kim Jong-Kyum
63	(Germany) HRT Ford Performance	Ford Mustang GT3	PA	(Germany) Patrick Assenheimer	(Germany) Hubert Haupt	(Germany) Vincent Kolb	(Germany) Dirk Müller
64	(Germany) HRT Ford Performance	Ford Mustang GT3	P	(India) Arjun Maini	(Norway) Dennis Olsen	(Germany) Jusuf Owega	(Germany) Frank Stippler
65	(Germany) HRT Ford Performance	Ford Mustang GT3	PA	(Germany) Dennis Fetzer	(Germany) Jusuf Owega	(Germany) Salman Owega	(Germany) David Schumacher
84	(Austria) Eastalent Racing Team	Audi R8 LMS Evo II	P	(Austria) Max Hofer	(Austria) Christian Klien	(Austria) Simon Reicher	(Austria) Norbert Siedler
98	(Germany) Rowe Racing	BMW M4 GT3 Evo	P	(Brazil) Augusto Farfus	(Finland) Jesse Krohn	(South Africa) Kelvin van der Linde	(Switzerland) Raffaele Marciello
786	(Thailand) Renazzo Motorsport Team	Lamborghini Huracán GT3 Evo 2	Am	(Germany) Christoph Breuer	(Germany) Thomas Mutsch	(Thailand) Sak Nana	(Germany) Dieter Schmidtmann
911	(Germany) Manthey EMA	Porsche 911 GT3 R (992)	P	(France) Kévin Estre	(Turkey) Ayhancan Güven	(France) Patrick Pilet	(Austria) Thomas Preining
SP 10 – SRO GT4 (10 entries)
67	(Germany) AV Racing by Black Falcon	BMW M4 GT4 Evo (G82)	P	(United States) "Bear"	(United States) Ryan Harrison	(United States) Alexandru Vasilescu	(Germany) Leon Wassertheurer
74	(Germany) Walkenhorst Motorsport	Aston Martin Vantage AMR GT4 Evo	Am	(Belgium) Aris Balanian	(France) Jean-Christophe David	(Germany) Joshua Hansen	(Germany) Hermann Vortkamp
111	(Germany) SR Motorsport by Schnitzelalm	Mercedes-AMG GT4	Am	(Germany) Tim Neuser	(Germany) Reinhold Renger	(Germany) David Thilenius	(Germany) Guido Wirtz
164	(Germany) W&S Motorsport	Porsche 718 Cayman GT4 RS Clubsport	P	(Germany) Stephan Brodmerkel	(Germany) Hendrik Still	(Germany) Jürgen Vöhringer	(Germany) Niclas Wiedmann
169	(Germany) Dörr Motorsport	Aston Martin Vantage AMR GT4	Am	(Germany) Michael Funke	(Germany) Peter Posavac		
170	(Germany) Toyo Tires with Ring Racing	Toyota GR Supra GT4 Evo	Am	(Japan) Takayuki Kinoshita	(Germany) Michael Tischner	(Germany) Heiko Tönges	'
175	(Germany) PROsport Racing	Aston Martin Vantage AMR GT4	P	(Germany) Michel Albers	(Germany) Yannick Himmels	(Chile) Benjamín Hites	
179	(Germany) Dörr Motorsport	Aston Martin Vantage AMR GT4	P	(Germany) Sven Schädler	(Germany) Frank Weishar		
187	(Germany) FK Performance Motorsport	BMW M4 GT4 (G82)	P	(Germany) Nick Hancke	(Denmark) Andreas Jochimsen	(Germany) Tobias Wahl	(Germany) Nick Wüstenhagen
188	(Germany) FK Performance Motorsport	BMW M4 GT4 (G82)	Am	(Germany) Martin Kaemena			
Cup2 Porsche 992 Cup (11 entries)
94	(Germany) Sante Royale Racing Team	Porsche 911 GT3 Cup (992)	P	(Germany) David Kiefer	(Germany) Marius Kiefer	(Germany) Stefan Kiefer	(Germany) Luca Rettenbacher
777	(Germany) RPM Racing	Porsche 911 GT3 Cup (992)	Am	(Germany) Philip Hamprecht	(Netherlands) Patrick Huisman	(Sweden) Niclas Jönsson	(United States) Tracy Krohn
900	(Germany) Black Falcon Team Zimmermann	Porsche 911 GT3 Cup (992)	Am	(Germany) Alexander Hardt	(Germany) Thomas Kiefer	(United States) Peter Ludwig	(Germany) Maik Rosenberg
901	(Germany) SRS Team Sorg Rennsport	Porsche 911 GT3 Cup (992)	Am	(Ukraine) Oleksiy Kikireshko	(Germany) Fabio Große	(Switzerland) Patrik Grütter	
904	(Belgium) Mühlner Motorsport	Porsche 911 GT3 Cup (992)	Am	(Slovakia) Antal Zsigo	(Germany) Michael Rebhan		
912	(Germany) KKrämer Racing	Porsche 911 GT3 Cup (992)	Am	(Germany) Karsten Krämer	(Germany) Michele di Martino	(Germany) Steinhardt Sascha	
918	(Belgium) Mühlner Motorsport	Porsche 911 GT3 Cup (992)	P	(Germany) Nick Salewsky	(Germany) Tim Scheerbarth	(Estonia) Martin Rump	
919	(Germany) Clickversicherung.de Team	Porsche 911 GT3 Cup (992)	P	(Germany) Robin Chrzanowski	(Germany) Kersten Jodexnis	(Germany) Kersten Richard-Sven	(Germany) Peter Scharmach
927	(Germany) Max Kruse Racing	Porsche 911 GT3 Cup (992)	P	(Netherlands) Tom Coronel	(Netherlands) Paul Meijer	(Netherlands) Rudy van Buren	(Netherlands) Jan Jaap van Roon
929	(Germany) KKrämer Racing	Porsche 911 GT3 Cup (992)	Am	(Germany) Karsten Krämer	(Germany) Fidel Leib	(Germany) Tobias Vazquez-Garcia	
948	(Germany) 48 Losch by Black Falcon	Porsche 911 GT3 Cup (992)	P	(Germany) Tobias Müller	(Germany) Noah Nagelsdiek	(Luxembourg) Dylan Pereira	(Germany) Carlos Rivas
Cup3 Cayman GT4 Trophy (12 entries)
932	(United Kingdom) Breakell Racing	Porsche 718 Cayman GT4 RS Clubsport	Am	(Spain) Guillermo Aso	(Spain) Alvaro Fontes	(United Kingdom) Pippa Mann	(United Kingdom) Martin Rich
939	(Belgium) Mühlner Motorsport	Porsche 718 Cayman GT4 RS Clubsport	P	(United States) Ke Shao	(Germany) Janis Waldow		
941	(Belgium) Mühlner Motorsport	Porsche 718 Cayman GT4 RS Clubsport	P	(Germany) Nick Deißler	(Germany) Aaron Wenisch		
945	(Thailand) Renazzo Motorsport Team	Porsche 718 Cayman GT4 RS Clubsport	Am	(Germany) Markus Nölken	(Germany) Otto Klohs	(Japan) Kouichi Okumura	
949	(Germany) SRS Team Sorg Rennsport	Porsche 718 Cayman GT4 RS Clubsport	Am	(Germany) Henning Eschweiler	(Sweden) Tommy Graberg	(Lithuania) Kasparas Vingilis	
959	(Germany) SRS Team Sorg Rennsport	Porsche 718 Cayman GT4 RS Clubsport	Am	(Germany) Heiko Eichenberg	(United Kingdom) Harley Haughton	(Germany) Björn Simon	
962	(Germany) W&S Motorsport	Porsche 718 Cayman GT4 RS Clubsport	P	(France) Joshua Bednarski	(Germany) Kai Riemer	(Germany) Lorenz Stegmann	(Germany) Finn Zulauf
969	(Germany) SRS Team Sorg Rennsport	Porsche 718 Cayman GT4 RS Clubsport	Am	(New Zealand) Robert Stewart	(Germany) Kurt Strube	(Germany) Christian Volz	(Austria) Bernhard Wagner
977	(Germany) Wiesmann SHK by Eifelkind Racing	Porsche 718 Cayman GT4 RS Clubsport	Am	(Germany) Desiree Müller	(Germany) Tim Lukas Müller		
978	(Germany) KKrämer Racing	Porsche 718 Cayman GT4 RS Clubsport	P	(Germany) Christopher Brück	(Germany) Karsten Krämer		
979	(Germany) SRS Team Sorg Rennsport	Porsche 718 Cayman GT4 RS Clubsport	P	(Germany) Anna-Lena Binkowska	(Germany) David Binkowska	(Germany) Dietmar Binkowska	(Germany) Alexander Müller
982	(Germany) W&S Motorsport	Porsche 718 Cayman GT4 RS Clubsport	Am	(Germany) Axel Duffner	(Germany) Christoph Krombach	(Germany) Fabian Peitzmeier	(Germany) Höber René
TCR (6 entries)
776	(Armenia) Goroyan RT by sharky-racing	Audi RS 3 LMS TCR (2021)		(France) Nathanaël Berthon	(Germany) Danny Brink	(Armenia) Artur Goroyan	(Armenia) Roman Mavlanov
800	(Germany) asBest Racing	Volkswagen Golf GTI TCR		(Germany) Sebastian Schemmann	(Germany) Alexander Schmidt		
808	(Germany) asBest Racing	Cupra León TCR		(Germany) Lutz Obermann	(Germany) Joachim Rabe		
816	(Germany) Scherer Sport PHX	Audi RS 3 LMS TCR (2021)		(Germany) Stephan Epp	(Switzerland) Mathias Schläppi	(Switzerland) Frederic Yerly	
830	(South Korea) Hyundai Motorsport	Hyundai Elantra N TCR (2024)		(Germany) Marc Basseng	(Germany) Christer Jöns	(Germany) Manuel Lauck	
831	(South Korea) Hyundai Motorsport	Hyundai Elantra N TCR (2024)		(United States) Mason Filippi	(United States) Michael Lewis	(United States) Bryson Morris	(Canada) Robert Wickens
Other Classes
SP 8T (7 entries)
59	(Germany) Dörr Motorsport	McLaren Artura Trophy Evo		(Germany) Ben Dörr	(Germany) Phil Dörr	(Germany) Timo Glock	(Germany) Volker Strycek
66	(Germany) ME Motorsport	BMW M4 GT4 (G82)		(Germany) Markus Eichele	(Germany) Philip Wiskirchen	(Germany) Moritz Wiskirchen	
110	(Japan) Toyota Gazoo Rookie Racing	Toyota GR Supra GT4 Evo2		(Japan) Naoya Gamou	(Japan) Tatsuya Kataoka	(Japan) Takamitsu Matsui	(Japan) Masahiro Sasaki
140	(Germany) PROsport Racing	Aston Martin Vantage GT8R		(Belgium) Guido Dumarey	(Belgium) Maxime Dumarey	(Austria) Raphael Rennhofer	(Germany) Marcel Marchewicz
150	(Germany) Team Bilstein by Black Falcon	BMW M4 GT4 Evo (G82)		(United Kingdom) Jimmy Broadbent	(United Kingdom) Steve Alvarez Brown	(Netherlands) Misha Charoudin	(Germany) Manuel Metzger
160	(Germany) Toyo Tires with Ring Racing	Toyota GR Supra GT4 Evo		(France) Giuliano Alesi	(Japan) Kazuto Kotaka	(Japan) Miki Koyama	(Japan) Yuichi Nakayama
189	(Switzerland) Hofor Racing by Bonk Motorsport	BMW M4 GT4 (G82)		(Australia) Mike Bailey	(Germany) Michael Bonk	(Germany) Peter Bonk	
SP 7 (7 entries)
70	(Germany) Black Falcon Team Zimmermann	Porsche Cayman GT4 RS Clubsport		(Germany) David Barst	(Germany) Anton Ruf	(Germany) Axel Sartingen	(Germany) Nils Schwenk
77	(Germany) BSL Racing Team	Porsche Cayman GT4 RS Clubsport		(Switzerland) Philipp Hagnauer	(Germany) Georg Kiefer	(Germany) Christoph Ruhrmann	(Switzerland) Alexander Walker
80	(Germany) tm-racing.org	Porsche 718 Cayman GT4 RS Clubsport		(Germany) Benedikt Höpfer	(Germany) Reiner Neuffer		
97	(Germany) Saugmotoren Motorsport	Porsche 911 GT3 Cup (997)		(Germany) Valentin Lachenmayer	(Germany) Julian Reeh	(Germany) Ralf Schall	(Germany) Mark Trompeter
778	(Germany) RPM Racing	Porsche 991 GT3 II Cup		(Germany) Philip Hamprecht	(Germany) Lukas Mösgen		
877	(Germany) asBest Racing	Porsche 718 Cayman GT4 RS Clubsport		(Germany) John Lee Schambony	(Germany) Kim Berwanger		
909	(Germany) SRS Team Sorg Rennsport	Porsche 991 GT3 II Cup		(Germany) Mathias Benndorf	(Germany) Lukas Ertl	(Germany) Maximilian Ertl	(Germany) Stefan Ertl
SP 4T (2 entries)
69	(Belgium) HY Racing / Andalucia Circuit	Porsche 718 Cayman GTS		(Italy) Bruno Barbaro	(Belgium) Jacques Derenne	(Belgium) Olivier Muytjens	(France) Fabrice Reicher
88	(Japan) Subaru Tecnica International	Subaru WRX STI GT N24		(Netherlands) Carlo van Dam	(Japan) Rintaro Kubo	(Japan) Kota Sasaki	(Germany) Tim Schrick
SP 3T (6 entries)
13	(Germany) White Angel for Fly and Help	Volkswagen New Beetle RSR		(Germany) Oliver Bliss	(Germany) Bernd Albrecht	(Germany) Sebastian Asch	(Germany) Carsten Knechtges
300	(Germany) Ollis Garage Racing	Dacia Logan		(Germany) Martin Kaffka	(Germany) Oliver Kriese	(Germany) Gregor Starck	
303	(South Korea) Hyundai Motorsport	Hyundai Elantra N Cup		(United States) Jeff Ricca	(South Korea) Kim Gyumin	(South Korea) Kim Yougchan	(China) Zhendong Zhang
310	(Germany) FK Performance Motorsport	BMW M2 Racing (G87)		(Germany) Michael Bräutigam	(Belgium) Ugo de Wilde	(Germany) Jens Klingmann	(Belgium) Charles Weerts
317	(Germany) Bulldog Racing	Mini Cooper JCW Pro		(Austria) Markus Fischer	(United Kingdom) Toby Goodman	(Germany) Sebastian Sauerbrei	(Canada) Samantha Tan
321	(Germany) Boostconsulting by sharky-racing	Volkswagen Golf GTI TCR		(Germany) Sarah Ganser	(Netherlands) Filip Hoenjet	(Kyrgyzstan) Oleg Kvitka	(Germany) Moritz Rosenbach
SP 3 (2 entries)
275	(Germany) Ravenol Motorsport by MDM Racing	BMW 318ti Cup (E46)		(Germany) Mika König	(Germany) Thomas Röpke		
277	(Germany) Ravenol Motorsport by MDM Racing	BMW 318ti Cup (E46)		(Germany) Marc David Müller	(Germany) Christopher Groth	(Germany) Markus Rupp	
SP 2T (2 entries)
109	(Japan) Toyota Gazoo Rookie Racing	Toyota GR Yaris DAT Concept		(Japan) "Morizo"	(Japan) Hiroaki Ishiura	(Japan) Kazuya Oshima	(Japan) Daisuke Toyoda
382	(Japan) Toyota Gazoo Rookie Racing	Toyota GR Yaris DAT Concept		(Japan) "Morizo"	(Japan) Hiroaki Ishiura	(Japan) Kazuya Oshima	(Japan) Daisuke Toyoda
SP-Pro (1 entry)
347	(Germany) Toyo Tires with Ring Racing	Porsche 911 GT3 Cup MR		(Germany) Andreas Gülden	(Germany) Marc Hennerici	(Germany) Tim Sandtler	
V6 (4 entries)
396	(Germany) Adrenalin Motorsport Team Mainhattan Wheels	Porsche Cayman S		(Spain) Carlos Arimón	(Germany) Christian Büllesbach	(Germany) Klaus Faßbender	(Germany) Andreas Schettler
410	(Germany) rent2Drive-racing	Porsche Cayman GTS		(Germany) David Ackermann	(Germany) Georg Arbinger	(United Kingdom) Scott Marshall	(France) Jérôme Larbi
414	(Germany) Köppen Motorsport	Porsche 911 Carrera		(Germany) Alexander Köppen	(Germany) Sebastian Rings	(Poland) Jacek Pydys	(Germany) Andreas Schaflitzl
418	(Germany) Köppen Motorsport	Porsche Cayman 718		(Germany) Heinz Jürgen Kroner	(Mexico) Xavier Lamadrid	(Colombia) César Mendieta	
V5 (5 entries)
440	(Germany) aQTQ-Raceperformance	Porsche Cayman CQ11		(Switzerland) Mirco Böhmisch	(Germany) Florian Ebener	(Germany) Florian Kramer	(Germany) Andreas Müller
444	(Germany) Adrenalin Motorsport Team Mainhattan Wheels	Porsche Cayman CM12		(Germany) Ulrich Korn	(Germany) Tobias Korn		
445	(Germany) rent2Drive-racing	Porsche Cayman CM12		(Germany) Georg Arbinger	(Germany) Philip Ade	(France) Joël Le Bihan	
448	(Germany) tm-racing.org	Porsche Cayman CM12		(Germany) Benedikt Höpfer	(Germany) Fabio Sacchi		
455	(Germany) asBest Racing	Porsche Cayman CM12		(Germany) Matthias Trinius	(Italy) Florian Haller		
VT2 (16 entries)
268	(Germany) Jaco's Paddock Motorsport GmbH	Toyota Supra (A90)	VTH	(Malaysia) Chong Kait Wai	(Japan) Takashi Ito	(Japan) Kohta Kawaai	
466	(Germany) Walkenhorst Motorsport	Hyundai i30 Fastback N	VTF	(Germany) Niklas Abrahamsen	(Germany) Bennet Ehrl	(Germany) Sarah Ganser	(United States) Tazio Ottis
471	(Germany) Auto Thomas by Jung Motorsport	Cupra Leon (KL)	VTF	(Germany) Michael Eichhorn	(United States) Tony Roma	(Netherlands) Chris Rothoff	(Germany) Andreas Winterwerber
472	(Germany) Auto Thomas by Jung Motorsport	Cupra Leon (KL)	VTF	(Germany) Marc Etzkorn	(Germany) Achim Ewenz	(Germany) Lars Füting	(Germany) Tim Robertz
477	(Germany) asBest Racing	Volkswagen Scirocco R TSI	VTF	(Switzerland) Thomas Alpiger	(Germany) Christian Koger		
480	(Germany) Dupré Engineering	Audi S3 Sedan Racing	VTF	(Germany) Christoph Dupré	(Germany) Joachim Nett	(Germany) Jürgen Nett	
484	(Germany) Teichmann Racing	Toyota Supra (A90)	VTH	(Germany) Michael Mönch	(Germany) Karl-Heinz Teichmann		
488	(Germany) Adrenalin Motorsport Team Mainhattan Wheels	BMW 128ti (F40)	VTF	(Italy) Alberto Carobbio	(Italy) Ugo Vicenzi		
500	(Germany) Adrenalin Motorsport Team Mainhattan Wheels	BMW 330i (G20)	VTH	(Germany) Philipp Leisen	(Germany) Philipp Stahlschmidt		
501	(Germany) Adrenalin Motorsport Team Mainhattan Wheels	BMW 330i (G20)	VTH	(Germany) Matthias Beckwermert	(Germany) "Sub7BTG"		
502	(Singapore) Giti Tire Motorsport by WS Racing	BMW 328i (F30)	VTH	(Germany) Thomas Ehrhardt	(Germany) Niklas Ehrhardt	(Germany) Jan Ullrich	(Germany) Fabian Pirrone
504	(Germany) SRS Team Sorg Rennsport	BMW 330i (G20)	VTH	(Germany) Mathias Baar	(Netherlands) Piet-Jan Ooms	(Germany) Marius Rauer	
505	(Germany) Time Attack Paderborn	BMW 328i (F30)	VTH	(Germany) Fritz Hebig	(Denmark) Kaj Schubert	(Germany) Fabian Tillmann	(Germany) Michael Wolpertinger
506	(Singapore) Giti Tire Motorsport by WS Racing	BMW 328i (F30)	VTH	(Germany) Lukas Drost	(Germany) Christoph Merkt	(Germany) Kevin Küpper	(Romania) Theodor Devolescu
514	(Germany) SRS Team Sorg Rennsport	BMW 330i (G20)	VTH	(Germany) Christian Coen	(Netherlands) Tim Peeters		
520	(Germany) Toyo Tires with Ring Racing	Toyota Supra (A90)	VTH	(Germany) Malte Tack	(Germany) Manfred Röss	(Germany) Matthias Röss	
AT3 (8 entries)
10	(Germany) Max Kruse Racing	Volkswagen Golf GTI TCR		(Germany) Max Kruse	(Switzerland) Christoph Lenz	(Switzerland) Armando Stanco	(Switzerland) Dario Stanco
19	(Germany) Max Kruse Racing	Volkswagen Golf GTI TCR Clubsport 24h		(Germany) Heiko Hammel	(Sweden) Johan Kristoffersson	(Germany) Benjamin Leuchter	(Germany) Nicholas Otto
76	(Germany) Max Kruse Racing	Volkswagen Golf GTI TCR Clubsport 24h		(Switzerland) Jasmin Preisig	(Germany) Timo Hochwind	(Germany) Christian Gebhardt	(Germany) Fabian Vettel
146	(Singapore) Giti Tire Motorsport by WS Racing	BMW M4 GT4 (G82)		(Germany) Janina Schall	(Germany) Carrie Schreiner	(Latvia) Patricija Stalidzane	(Liechtenstein) Fabienne Wohlwend
420	(Germany) Four Motors Bioconcept-Car	Porsche 718 Cayman GT4 Clubsport (982)		(Germany) Henning Cramer	(Germany) Christoph Hewer	(Switzerland) Marc Schöni	(Germany) Oliver Sprungmann
633	(Germany) Four Motors Bioconcept-Car	Porsche 718 Cayman GT4 Clubsport (982)		(Denmark) Henrik Bollerslev	(Switzerland) Boris Hrubesch	(Germany) Alesia Kreutzpointner	(Germany) Jacqueline Kreutzpointner
827	(China) Fancy by Teamwork Motorsport	Lynk & Co 03 TCR		(Hong Kong) Wong Yatshing	(China) Chuang Yan	(China) Zhang Zhiqiang	
888	(Switzerland) Hofor Racing by Bonk Motorsport	BMW M4 GT4 Evo (G82)		(Germany) Max Partl	(Germany) Jörg Weidinger	(Germany) Thorsten Wolter	
AT2 (3 entry)
320	(Germany) Four Motors Bioconcept-Car	Porsche 992 GT3 Cup		(Germany) Thomas von Löwis of Menar	(Netherlands) Marco van Ramshorst	(Germany) Michael "Smudo" Schmidt	(Germany) Luka Wlömer
644	(Germany) Max Kruse Racing	Porsche 992 GT3 Cup		(Netherlands) Tom Coronel	(Germany) Dominik Fugel	(Germany) Marcel Fugel	(Germany) Moritz Östreich
718	(Germany) Manthey Team eFuel Griesemann	Porsche 718 Cayman GT4 RS Clubsport M		(Germany) Björn Griesemann	(Germany) Georg Griesemann		
M240i (9 entries)
542	(Germany) Keeevin Sports and Racing	BMW M240i Racing (F22)		(Germany) Jörg Schönfelder	(Germany) Serge van Vooren		
650	(Germany) Adrenalin Motorsport Team Mainhattan Wheels	BMW M240i Racing (F22)		(Germany) Sven Markert	(Germany) Kevin Wambach		
651	(Germany) Adrenalin Motorsport Team Mainhattan Wheels	BMW M240i Racing (F22)		(Germany) Lars Harbeck	(Germany) Oskar Sandberg		
652	(Germany) Adrenalin Motorsport Team Mainhattan Wheels	BMW M240i Racing (F22)		(Germany) David Grießner	(Germany) Laura Luft		
658	(Turkey) Gamsiz Motorsport	BMW M240i Racing (F22)		(Belgium) Hakan Sari	(Belgium) Recep Sari	(Turkey) Ersin Yüsecan	
665	(Singapore) Giti Tire Motorsport by WS Racing	BMW M240i Racing (F22)		(Germany) Maximilian Eisberg	(Germany) Finn Mache	(Germany) Luca Link	(Germany) Bernd Küppe
667	(United Kingdom) Breakell Racing	BMW M240i Racing (F22)		(United Kingdom) James Breakell	(United Kingdom) David Drinkwater	(United States) Gino Manley	(Switzerland) Andreas Simon
677	(Germany) asBest Racing	BMW M240i Racing (F22)		(Germany) Thomas Alpiger	(Germany) Alexander Schmidt		
680	(Germany) Up2Race	BMW M240i Racing (F22)		(Germany) Torben Berger	(Germany) Jannik Reinhard	(Netherlands) John van der Sanden	
325i (3 entries)
100	(Germany) EiFelkind Racing	BMW 325i (E90)		(Austria) Michael Fischer	(Germany) Christopher Gruber	(Germany) Stefan Schäfer	(Germany) Michael Schrey
101	(Germany) EiFelkind Racing	BMW 325i (E90)		(Sweden) Dan Berghult	(Japan) Ryusuke Masumato	(Sweden) Jonas Nilsson	(Germany) Karsten Welker
700	(Germany) rent2Drive-racing	BMW 325i (E90)		(Germany) Oliver Friße	(Germany) Jürgen Huber	(Germany) Simon Sagmeister	(Germany) Dirk Vleugels

Icon	Class
GT3 entries
P	SP9 GT3-Pro
PA	SP9 GT3 Pro-Am
Am	SP9 GT3 Am
GT4 entries
P	SP10 GT4-Pro
Am	SP10 GT4 Pro-Am
992 entries
Icon	Class
P	Cup 2-Pro
Am	Cup 2-Am
Cayman GT4 entries
Icon	Class
P	Cup 3-Pro
Am	Cup 3-Am
VT2 Production entries
VTF	VT2 Front
VTH	VT2 Hecka

== Qualifying ==
=== Top Qualifying / Starting Group 1 ===
Pos.	Class	No.	Team	Car	Fastest lap from Qualifying 1, 2 and 3	Top Qualifying
1	SP 9 Pro	911	(Germany) Manthey EMA	Porsche 911 GT3 R (992)	8:15.379	8:12.741
2	SP 9 Pro	45	(Japan) Realize Kondo Racing with Rinaldi	Ferrari 296 GT3	8:20.001	8:13.909
3	SP 9 Pro	14	(Germany) Mercedes-AMG Team GetSpeed	Mercedes-AMG GT3 Evo	8:20.152	8:14.233
4	SP 9 Pro	33	(Germany) Falken Motorsports	Porsche 911 GT3 R (992)	8:18.122	8:14.279
5	SP 9 Pro	1	(Germany) Scherer Sport PHX	Audi R8 LMS Evo II	8:10.580	8:15.294
6	SP 9 Pro	28	(Germany) Abt Sportsline	Lamborghini Huracán GT3 Evo 2	8:11.647	8:16.088
7	SP 9 Pro	17	(Germany) Mercedes-AMG Team GetSpeed	Mercedes-AMG GT3 Evo	8:22.383	8:17.369
8	SP 9 Pro	34	(Germany) Walkenhorst Motorsport	Aston Martin Vantage AMR GT3 Evo	8:14.493	8:19.396
9	SP 9 Pro	44	(Germany) Falken Motorsports	Porsche 911 GT3 R (992)	8:22.015	8:20.815
10	SP 9 Pro-Am	48	(Germany) Black Falcon Team EAE	Porsche 911 GT3 R (992)	8:18.895	8:16.181 (Note: 3-place grid penalty.)
11	SP 9 Pro-Am	8	(Lithuania) Juta Racing	Audi R8 LMS Evo II	8:24.217	8:25.481
12	SP 9 Am	30	(Germany) Walkenhorst Motorsport	Aston Martin Vantage AMR GT3 Evo	8:59.362	8:38.209
13	SP 9 Pro-Am	37	(Germany) PROsport Racing	Aston Martin Vantage AMR GT3	8:14.600	—N/a
14	SP 9 Pro	64	(Germany) HRT Ford Performance	Ford Mustang GT3	8:15.043	—N/a
15	SP 9 Pro	7	(Austria) Konrad Motorsport	Lamborghini Huracán GT3 Evo 2	8:16.514	—N/a
16	SP 9 Pro	84	(Austria) Eastalent Racing Team	Audi R8 LMS Evo II	8:16.550	—N/a
17	SP 9 Pro	98	(Germany) Rowe Racing	BMW M4 GT3 Evo	8:16.738	—N/a
18	SP 9 Pro-Am	63	(Germany) HRT Ford Performance	Ford Mustang GT3	8:18.201	—N/a
19	SP 9 Pro	54	(Italy) Dinamic GT	Porsche 911 GT3 R (992)	8:19.050	—N/a
20	SP 9 Pro-Am	35	(Germany) Walkenhorst Motorsport	Aston Martin Vantage AMR GT3 Evo	8:20.369	DSQ
21	SP 9 Am	786	(Thailand) Renazzo Motorsport Team	Lamborghini Huracán GT3 Evo 2	8:25.500	—N/a
22	SP 9 Pro-Am	55	(South Korea) Hankook Competition	Porsche 911 GT3 R (992)	8:25.806	—N/a
23	SP 9 Am	50	(Germany) équipe vitesse	Audi R8 LMS Evo II	8:31.399	—N/a
24	SP-Pro	347	(Germany) Toyo Tires with Ring Racing	Porsche 911 GT3 Cup MR	8:45.434	—N/a
25	SP 9 Pro-Am	65	(Germany) HRT Ford Performance	Ford Mustang GT3	8:30.386 (Note: 2-place grid penalty.)	DSQ
26	SP 9 Pro-Am	11	(Germany) SR Motorsport by Schnitzelalm	Mercedes-AMG GT3 Evo	8:22.549	No time (Note: Required to start from the back of starting group.)
27	SP 9 Pro	27	(Germany) Red Bull Team Abt	Lamborghini Huracán GT3 Evo 2	8:12.279	8:14.363 (Note: No. 27 Red Bull Team Abt were required to start from pit lane after Starting Group due to speeding under red flag in Top Qualifying.)

== Race Result ==
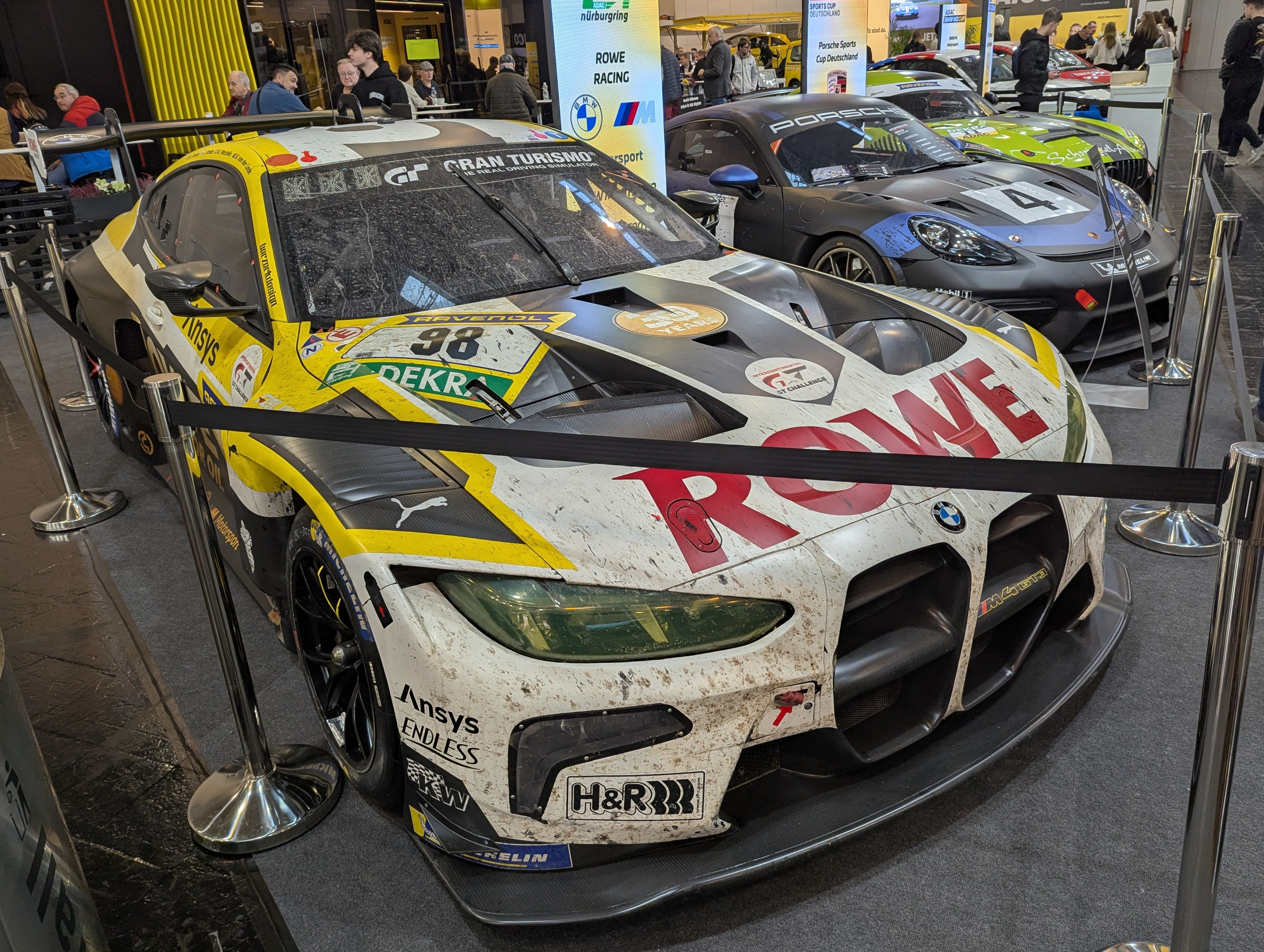
BMW's sole factory entry, #98 Rowe Racing's BMW M4 GT3 Evo, won following a post-race penalty to Manthey Racing.

- Class winners are denoted in **bold** and with ‡.
- Drivers in italics were entered in cars that completed the race, however did not complete the required 2 laps to be classified as a finisher.
- The minimum number of laps for classification at the finish (50% of the overall race winner's distance) was 71 laps.

Pos	Class	No	Team/Entrant	Drivers	Vehicle	Laps	Time/Retired
1	**SP 9 Pro**	**98**	**(Germany) Rowe Racing**	**(Brazil) Augusto Farfus (Finland) Jesse Krohn (Switzerland) Raffaele Marciello (South Africa) Kelvin van der Linde**	**BMW M4 GT3 Evo**	**141**	**24:02:41.104‡**
2	SP 9 Pro	911	(Germany) Manthey EMA	(France) Kévin Estre (Turkey) Ayhancan Güven (Austria) Thomas Preining (France) Patrick Pilet	Porsche 911 GT3 R	141	+1:17.810^{1}
3	SP 9 Pro	54	(Italy) Dinamic GT	(Denmark) Bastian Buus (Italy) Matteo Cairoli (Netherlands) Loek Hartog (Germany) Joel Sturm	Porsche 911 GT3 R	140	+1 Lap
4	**SP 9 Pro-Am**	**65**	**(Germany) HRT Ford Performance**	**(Germany) Dennis Fetzer (Germany) Jusuf Owega (Germany) Salman Owega (Germany) David Schumacher**	**Ford Mustang GT3**	**140**	**+1 Lap‡**
5	SP 9 Pro	28	(Germany) Abt Sportsline	(Germany) Christian Engelhart (Germany) Luca Engstler (Italy) Marco Mapelli	Lamborghini Huracán GT3 Evo 2	140	+1 Lap
6	SP 9 Pro	84	(Austria) Eastalent Racing Team	(Austria) Max Hofer (Austria) Christian Klien (Austria) Simon Reicher (Austria) Norbert Siedler	Audi R8 LMS Evo II	137	+4 Laps
7	SP 9 Pro-Am	37	(Germany) PROsport Racing	(Germany) Nico Bastian (Germany) Marek Böckmann (France) Steven Palette	Aston Martin Vantage AMR GT3	137	+4 Laps
8	SP 9 Pro-Am	7	(Austria) Konrad Motorsport	(Germany) Peter Elkmann (Bulgaria) Pavel Lefterov (Germany) Maximilian Paul (United States) Danny Soufi	Lamborghini Huracán GT3 Evo 2	137	+4 Laps
9	SP 9 Pro-Am	55	(South Korea) Hankook Competition	(South Korea) Roelof Bruins (Canada) Steven Cho (Germany) Marco Holzer (South Korea) Kim Jong-Kyum	Porsche 911 GT3 R	136	+5 Laps
10	**SP 9 Am**	**786**	**(Thailand) Renazzo Motorsport Team**	**(Germany) Christoph Breuer (Germany) Thomas Mutsch (Thailand) Sak Nana (Germany) Dieter Schmidtmann**	**Lamborghini Huracán GT3 Evo 2**	**135**	**+6 Laps‡**
11	**Cup2 Pro**	**948**	**(Germany) 48 Losch by Black Falcon**	**(Germany) Tobias Müller (Germany) Noah Nagelsdiek (Luxembourg) Dylan Pereira (Germany) Carlos Rivas**	**Porsche 992 GT3 Cup**	**135**	**+6 Laps‡**
12	SP 9 Pro-Am	8	(Lithuania) Juta Racing	(Germany) Elia Erhart (Germany) Pierre Kaffer (Kyrgyzstan) "Selv" (Germany) Alexey Veremenko	Audi R8 LMS Evo II	135	+6 Laps
13	SP 9 Pro-Am	11	(Germany) SR Motorsport by Schnitzelalm	(Germany) Christopher Brück (Germany) Jannes Fittje (Germany) Jay Mo Härtling (Germany) Kenneth Heyer	Mercedes-AMG GT3 Evo	134	+7 Laps
14	Cup2 Pro	918	(Belgium) Mühlner Motorsport	(Germany) Nick Salewsky (Germany) Tim Scheerbarth (Estonia) Martin Rump	Porsche 992 GT3 Cup	134	+7 Laps
15	Cup2 Pro	901	(Germany) SRS Team Sorg Rennsport	(Switzerland) Patrik Grütter (Germany) Fabio Große	Porsche 992 GT3 Cup	133	+8 Laps
16	**AT2**	**644**	**(Germany) Max Kruse Racing**	**(Netherlands) Tom Coronel (Germany) Dominik Fugel (Germany) Marcel Fugel (Germany) Moritz Östreich**	**Porsche 992 GT3 Cup**	**133**	**+8 Laps‡**
17	**Cup2 Am**	**900**	**(Germany) Black Falcon Team Zimmermann**	**(Germany) Alexander Hardt (Germany) Thomas Kiefer (United States) Peter Ludwig (Germany) Maik Rosenberg**	**Porsche 992 GT3 Cup**	**133**	**+8 Laps‡**
18	Cup2 Am	777	(Germany) RPM Racing	(Germany) Philip Hamprecht (Netherlands) Patrick Huisman (Sweden) Niclas Jönsson (United States) Tracy Krohn	Porsche 992 GT3 Cup	132	+9 Laps
19	**SP 8T**	**59**	**(Germany) Dörr Motorsport**	**(Germany) Ben Dörr (Germany) Phil Dörr (Germany) Mike David Ortmann (Germany) Volker Strycek**	**McLaren Artura Trophy**	**131**	**+10 Laps‡**
20	AT2	718	(Germany) Manthey Racing Team eFuel Griesemann	(Germany) Dirk Adorf (Germany) Björn Griesemann (Germany) Georg Griesemann (Germany) Yves Volte	Porsche 718 Cayman GT4	130	+11 Laps
21	SP 8T	150	(Germany) Team Bilstein by Black Falcon	(United Kingdom) Jimmy Broadbent (United Kingdom) Steve Alvarez Brown (Netherlands) Misha Charoudin (Germany) Manuel Metzger	BMW M4 GT4 Evo (G82)	130	+11 Laps
22	**TCR**	**830**	**(South Korea) Hyundai Motorsport N**	**(Germany) Marc Basseng (Germany) Christer Jöns (Germany) Manuel Lauck**	**Hyundai Elantra N TCR (2024)**	**130**	**+11 Laps‡**
23	Cup2 Pro	904	(Belgium) Mühlner Motorsport	(Germany) Kai Riemer (Germany) Christopher Rink (Germany) Janis Waldow (Slovakia) Antal Zsigo	Porsche 992 GT3 Cup	129	+12 Laps
24	**AT3**	**19**	**(Germany) Max Kruse Racing**	**(Germany) Heiko Hammel (Sweden) Johan Kristoffersson (Germany) Benjamin Leuchter (Germany) Nicholas Otto**	**Volkswagen Golf GTI TCR Clubsport 24h**	**128**	**+13 Laps‡**
25	TCR	831	(South Korea) Hyundai Motorsport N	(United States) Mason Filippi (United States) Michael Lewis (United States) Bryson Morris (Canada) Robert Wickens	Hyundai Elantra N TCR (2024)	127	+14 Laps
26	**Cup3 Pro**	**962**	**(Germany) W&S Motorsport**	**(France) Joshua Bednarski (Germany) Mortiz Oberheim (Germany) Lorenz Stegmann (Germany) Finn Zulauf**	**Porsche 718 Cayman GT4 Clubsport**	**127**	**+14 Laps‡**
27	AT2	320	(Germany) Four Motors Bioconcept-Car	(Germany) Ralf-Peter Bonk (Germany) Michelle Halder (Germany) Michael "Smudo" Schmidt (Netherlands) Marco van Ramshorst	Porsche 992 GT3 Cup	127	+14 Laps
28	SP 8T	66	(Germany) ME Motorsport	(Germany) Markus Eichele (Germany) Jörg Wiskirchen (Germany) Moritz Wiskirchen (Germany) Philip Wiskirchen	BMW M4 GT4 Evo (G82)	126	+15 Laps
29	SP 8T	110	(Japan) Toyota Gazoo Rookie Racing	(Japan) Naoya Gamou (Japan) Tatsuya Kataoka (Japan) Takamitsu Matsui (Japan) Masahiro Sasaki	Toyota GR Supra GT4 Evo2	126	+15 Laps
30	**SP 10**	**67**	**(Germany) AV Racing by Black Falcon**	**(United States) "Bear" (United States) Ryan Harrison (Romania) Alexandru Vasilescu (Germany) Leon Wassertheurer**	**BMW M4 GT4 Evo (G82)**	**125**	**+16 Laps‡**
31	SP 9 Am	30	(Germany) Walkenhorst Motorsport	(Germany) Stefan Aust (Germany) Christian Bollrath (Germany) Jörg Breuer (Germany) Henry Walkenhorst	Aston Martin Vantage AMR GT3 Evo	125	+16 Laps
32	**SP 7**	**97**	**(Germany) Saugmotoren Motorsport**	**(Germany) Valentin Lachenmayer (Germany) Julian Reeh (Germany) Ralf Schall (Germany) Mark Trompeter**	**Porsche 911 GT3 Cup (997)**	**124**	**+17 Laps‡**
33	TCR	776	(Armenia) Goroyan RT by Sharky Racing	(France) Nathanaël Berthon (Germany) Danny Brink (Armenia) Artur Goroyan (Armenia) Roman Mavlanov	Audi RS 3 LMS TCR (2021)	121	+20 Laps
34	Cup3 Pro	977	(Germany) Wiesmann SHK by Eifelkind Racing	(Mexico) Juan Carlos Carmona Chavez (Germany) Desiree Müller (Germany) Tim Lukas Müller (Austria) Michael Fischer	Porsche 718 Cayman GT4 Clubsport	121	+20 Laps
35	**SP 3T**	**310**	**(Germany) FK Performance Motorsport**	**(Germany) Michael Bräutigam (Belgium) Ugo de Wilde (Germany) Jens Klingmann (Belgium) Charles Weerts**	**BMW M2 Racing (G87)**	**120**	**+21 Laps‡**
36	**Cup3 Am**	**969**	**(Germany) SRS Team Sorg Rennsport**	**(Germany) Meerbusch Maximilian (Australia) Robert Stewart (Germany) Kurt Strube (Austria) Bernhard Wagner**	**Porsche 718 Cayman GT4 Clubsport**	**119**	**+22 Laps‡**
37	Cup3 Pro	979	(Germany) SRS Team Sorg Rennsport	(Germany) Anna-Lena Binkowska (Germany) David Binkowska (Germany) Dietmar Binkowska (Germany) Alexander Müller	Porsche 718 Cayman GT4 Clubsport	119	+22 Laps
38	SP 7	80	(Germany) tm-racing.org	(Germany) Sebastian Brandl (Germany) Benedikt Höpfer (Germany) Reiner Neuffer (Germany) Fabio Sacchi	Porsche 718 Cayman GT4 RS Clubsport	118	+23 Laps
39	**M240i**	**650**	**(Germany) Adrenalin Motorsport Team Mainhattan Wheels**	**(Germany) Jocob Erlbacher (Germany) Stefan Gaukler (Germany) Sven Markert (Germany) Adrian Rziczny**	**BMW M240i Racing Cup**	**118**	**+23 Laps‡**
40	TCR	800	(Germany) asBest Racing	(Netherlands) Filip Hoenjet (Germany) Sebastian Schemmann (Germany) Rudi Speich (Germany) Roland Waschkau	Volkswagen Golf GTI TCR	117	+24 Laps
41	AT3	420	(Germany) Four Motors Bioconcept-Car	(Germany) Henning Cramer (Germany) Christoph Hewer (Switzerland) Marc Schöni (Germany) Oliver Sprungmann	Porsche 718 Cayman GT4 Clubsport (982)	117	+24 Laps
42	**VT2 Hecka**	**500**	**(Germany) Adrenalin Motorsport Team Mainhattan Wheels**	**(Germany) Philipp Leisen (Norway) Oskar Sandberg (Germany) Philipp Stahlschmidt (Germany) Daniel Zils**	**BMW 330i Racing (2020)**	**117**	**+24 Laps‡**
43	SP 7	77	(Germany) BSL Racing Team	(Switzerland) Philipp Hagnauer (Germany) Georg Kiefer (Germany) Christoph Ruhrmann (Switzerland) Alexander Walker	Porsche Cayman GT4 RS Clubsport	117	+24 Laps
44	M240i	680	(Germany) Up2Race	(Germany) Torben Berger (Germany) Carl-Friedrich Kolb (Germany) Jannik Reinhard (Netherlands) John van der Sanden	BMW M240i Racing Cup	117	+24 Laps
45	VT2 Hecka	520	(Germany) Toyo Tires with Ring Racing	(Germany) Manfred Röss (Germany) Matthias Röss (Germany) Malte Tack	Toyota Supra	116	+25 Laps
46	M240i	665	(Singapore) Giti Tire Motorsport by WS Racing	(Germany) Maximilian Eisberg (Germany) Bernd Küppe (Germany) Luca Link (Germany) Finn Mache	BMW M240i Racing Cup	116	+25 Laps
47	VT2 Hecka	504	(Germany) SRS Team Sorg Rennsport	(Netherlands) Piet-Jan Ooms (Germany) Marius Rauer (Japan) Yutaka Seki	BMW 330i Racing (2020)	116	+25 Laps
48	M240i	658	(Turkey) Gamsiz Motorsport	(Belgium) Hakan Sari (Belgium) Recep Sari (Turkey) Ersin Yüsecan	BMW M240i Racing Cup	115	+26 Laps
49	VT2 Hecka	501	(Germany) Adrenalin Motorsport Team Mainhattan Wheels	(United Kingdom) Farquini Deott (Germany) Robin Reimer (Germany) Zoran Radoulovic (Germany) Markus Schiller	BMW 330i Racing (2020)	114	+27 Laps
50	**V6**	**410**	**(Germany) rent2Drive-racing**	**(Germany) David Ackermann (Italy) Stefano Croci (France) Jérôme Larbi (United Kingdom) Scott Marshall**	**Porsche Cayman GTS**	**113**	**+28 Laps‡**
51	**V5**	**444**	**(Germany) Adrenalin Motorsport Team Mainhattan Wheels**	**(Hungary) Adam Benko (Germany) Daniel Korn (Germany) Tobias Korn (Germany) Ulrich Korn**	**Porsche Cayman CM12**	**113**	**+28 Laps‡**
52	**SP 2T**	**109**	**(Japan) Toyota Gazoo Rookie Racing**	**(Japan) "Morizo" (Japan) Hiroaki Ishiura (Japan) Kazuya Oshima (Japan) Daisuke Toyoda**	**Toyota GR Yaris DAT Concept**	**113**	**+28 Laps‡**
53	VT2 Hecka	514	(Germany) SRS Team Sorg Rennsport	(Germany) Mathias Baar (Germany) Christian Coen (Germany) Christian Knötschke (Belgium) Tim Peeters	BMW 330i Racing (2020)	113	+28 Laps
54	**SP 4T**	**69**	**(Belgium) HY Racing / Andalucia Circuit**	**(Italy) Bruno Barbaro (Belgium) Jacques Derenne (Belgium) Olivier Muytjens (France) Fabrice Reicher**	**Porsche 718 Cayman GT4 Clubsport**	**112**	**+29 Laps‡**
55	SP 3T	317	(Germany) Bulldog Racing	(Austria) Markus Fischer (United Kingdom) Toby Goodman (Germany) Sebastian Sauerbrei (Canada) Samantha Tan	Mini Cooper JCW Pro	111	+30 Laps
56	M240i	652	(Germany) Adrenalin Motorsport Team Mainhattan Wheels	(Germany) Thomas Ardelt (Germany) Manuel Dormagen (Germany) Marc Lehmann (Germany) Sven Oepen	BMW M240i Racing Cup	111	+30 Laps
57	AT3	827	(China) Fancy by Teamwork Motorsport	(Hong Kong) Wong Yatshing (China) Chuang Yan (China) Zhang Zhiqiang	Lynk & Co 03 TCR	111	+30 Laps
58	**325i**	**700**	**(Germany) rent2Drive-racing**	**(Germany) Oliver Friße (Germany) Jürgen Huber (Germany) Simon Sagmeister (Germany) Dirk Vleugels**	**BMW 325i Racing**	**110**	**+31 Laps‡**
59	**VT2 Front**	**471**	**(Germany) Auto Thomas by Jung Motorsport**	**(Germany) Michael Eichhorn (United States) Tony Roma (Netherlands) Chris Rothoff (Germany) Andreas Winterwerber**	**Cupra Leon KL**	**110**	**+31 Laps‡**
60	325i	100	(Germany) EiFelkind Racing	(Austria) Michael Fischer (Germany) Christopher Gruber (Germany) Stefan Schäfer (Germany) Michael Schrey	BMW 325i Racing	109	+32 Laps
61	V5	448	(Germany) tm-racing.org	(Germany) Rudolf Brandl (Germany) Alexander Müller (Germany) Christian Weber (Germany) Maximilian Weissermel	Porsche Cayman CM12	108	+33 Laps
62	VT2 Hecka	502	(Singapore) Giti Tire Motorsport by WS Racing	(Germany) Niklas Ehrhardt (Germany) Thomas Ehrhardt (Germany) Fabian Pirrone (Germany) Jan Ullrich	BMW 328i Racing	108	+33 Laps
63	V5	445	(Germany) rent2Drive-racing	(Germany) Philip Ade (Germany) Georg Arbinger (France) Joël Le Bihan (United Kingdom) Benjamin Lyons	Porsche Cayman CM12	107	+34 Laps
64	VT2 Front	480	(Germany) Dupré Engineering	(Germany) Christoph Dupré (Germany) Joachim Nett (Germany) Jürgen Nett	Audi S3 Sedan Racing	106	+35 Laps
65	SP 9 Pro-Am	48	(Germany) Black Falcon Team EAE	(Netherlands) Daan Pijl (Germany) Ben Bünnagel (Turkey) Mustafa Mehmet Kaya (Italy) Gabriele Piana	Porsche 911 GT3 R (992)	104	+37 Laps
66	AT3	146	(Singapore) Giti Tire Motorsport by WS Racing	(Germany) Janina Schall (Germany) Carrie Schreiner (Latvia) Patricija Stalidzane (Liechtenstein) Fabienne Wohlwend	BMW M4 GT4 (G82)	104	+37 Laps
67	M240i	667	(United Kingdom) Breakell Racing	(United Kingdom) James Breakell (United Kingdom) David Drinkwater (United States) Gino Manley (Switzerland) Andreas Simon	BMW M240i Racing Cup	104	+37 Laps
68	AT3	888	(Germany) Hofor Racing by Bonk Motorsport	(Germany) Max Partl (Germany) Michael Rebhan (Germany) Jörg Weidinger (Germany) Thorsten Wolter	BMW M4 GT4 EVO (G82)	103	+38 Laps
69	Cup3 Pro	949	(Germany) SRS Team Sorg Rennsport	(Germany) Henning Eschweiler (Canada) Damon Surzyshyn (Lithuania) Kasparas Vingilis (Germany) Finn Wiebelhaus	Porsche 718 Cayman GT4 RS Clubsport	102	+39 Laps
70	SP 9 Pro	17	(Germany) Mercedes-AMG Team GetSpeed	(Estonia) Ralf Aron (Austria) Lucas Auer (United Kingdom) Adam Christodoulou (Canada) Mikaël Grenier	Mercedes-AMG GT3 Evo	101	+40 Laps
71	SP 3T	808	(Germany) asBest Racing	(India) Akshay Gupta (Germany) Dennis Leissing (Germany) Lutz Obermann (Japan) Junichi Umemoto	Cupra TCR DSG	101	+40 Laps
72	VT2 Front	477	(Germany) asBest Racing	(Germany) Bastian Beck (Germany) Christian Koger (Germany) Michael Lachmayer (Germany) Robert Neumann	Volkswagen Scirocco R TSI	98	+43 Laps
73	Cup3 Am	932	(United Kingdom) Breakell Racing	(Spain) Guillermo Aso (Spain) Alvaro Fontes (United Kingdom) Pippa Mann (United Kingdom) Martin Rich	Porsche 718 Cayman GT4 RS Clubsport	97	+44 Laps
74	SP 10	187	(Germany) FK Performance Motorsport	(Germany) Nick Hancke (Denmark) Andreas Jochimsen (Switzerland) Andreas Mijatovic (Germany) Nick Wüstenhagen	BMW M4 GT4 (G82)	96	+45 Laps
75	V6	418	(Germany) SRS Team Sorg Rennsport	(Germany) Heinz Jürgen Kroner (Mexico) Xavier Lamadrid (Colombia) César Mendieta	Porsche Cayman 718	96	+45 Laps
76	SP 4T	88	(Japan) Subaru Tecnica International	(Netherlands) Carlo van Dam (Japan) Rintaro Kubo (Japan) Kota Sasaki (Germany) Tim Schrick	Subaru WRX STI GT N24	94	+47 Laps
77	M240i	651	(Germany) Adrenalin Motorsport Team Mainhattan Wheels	(Belgium) Bruno Beulen (Italy) Alessandro Cremascoli (Belgium) Dimitri Persoons (Belgium) Axel Soyez	BMW M240i Racing Cup	93	+48 Laps
78	VT2 Front	466	(Germany) Walkenhorst Motorsport	(Germany) Niklas Abrahamsen (Germany) Bennet Ehrl (Germany) Sarah Ganser (United States) Tazio Ottis	Hyundai i30 Fastback N	90	+51 Laps
79	Cup3 Am	982	(Germany) W&S Motorsport	(Germany) Axel Duffner (Germany) René Höber (Germany) Christoph Krombach (Germany) Fabian Peitzmeier	Porsche 718 Cayman GT4 RS Clubsport	87	+54 Laps
80	VT2 Hecka	506	(Singapore) Giti Tire Motorsport by WS Racing	(Romania) Theodor Devolescu (Germany) Lukas Drost (Germany) Kevin Küpper (Germany) Christoph Merkt	BMW 328i Racing	87	+54 Laps
81	SP 3T	321	(Germany) Goroyan RT by Sharkey Racing	(Germany) Philipp Eis (Germany) Constantin Ernst (Kyrgyzstan) Oleg Kvitka (Germany) Moritz Rosenbach	Volkswagen Golf GTI TCR DSG	86	+55 Laps
82	SP 8T	160	(Germany) Toyo Tires with Ring Racing	(France) Giuliano Alesi (Japan) Kazuto Kotaka (Japan) Miki Koyama (Japan) Yuichi Nakayama	Toyota GR Supra GT4 Evo	84	+57 Laps
83	SP 10	164	(Germany) W&S Motorsport	(Germany) Stephan Brodmerkel (Germany) Hendrik Still (Germany) Jürgen Vöhringer (Germany) Niclas Wiedmann	Porsche 718 Cayman GT4 RS Clubsport	83	+58 Laps
84	Cup3 Am	939	(Belgium) Mühlner Motorsport	(Sweden) Tommy Gråberg (Germany) Franz Linden (United States) Ke Shao (Switzerland) Rüdiger Schicht	Porsche 718 Cayman GT4 RS Clubsport	83	+58 Laps
85	VT2 Front	472	(Germany) Auto Thomas by Jung Motorsport	(Germany) Marc Etzkorn (Germany) Achim Ewenz (Germany) Lars Füting (Germany) Tim Robertz	Cupra Leon KL	82	+59 Laps
86	V5	455	(Germany) rent2Drive-racing	(Austria) Peter Baumann (Germany) Thorsten Held (Germany) John Lee Schambony (Germany) Matthias Trinius	Porsche Cayman CM12	79	+62 Laps
87	SP 3T	13	(Germany) White Angel for Fly and Help	(Germany) Bernd Albrecht (Germany) Sebastian Asch (Germany) Oliver Bliss (Germany) Carsten Knechtges	Volkswagen New Beetle RSR	78	+63 Laps
88	**SP 3**	**277**	**(Germany) Ravenol Motorsport by MDM Racing**	**(Germany) Mika König (Germany) Christopher Groth (Germany) Marc David Müller (Germany) Markus Rupp**	**BMW 318ti Cup**	**71**	**+70 Laps‡**
NC	SP 7	909	(Germany) SRS Team Sorg Rennsport	(Germany) Matthias Benndorf (Germany) Lukas Ertl (Germany) Maximilian Ertl (Germany) Stefan Ertl	Porsche 911 GT3 Cup (991)	61	Not classified
NC	V5	440	(Germany) aQTQ-Raceperformance	(Switzerland) Mirco Böhmisch (Germany) Florian Ebener (Germany) Florian Kramer (Germany) Andreas Müller	Porsche Cayman CQ11	54	Not classified
NC	SP 2T	382	(Japan) Toyota Gazoo Rookie Racing	(Japan) "Morizo" (Japan) Hiroaki Ishiura (Japan) Kazuya Oshima (Japan) Daisuke Toyoda	Toyota GR Yaris DAT Concept	18	Not classified
DNF	SP 9 Pro	27	(Germany) Red Bull Team Abt	(Italy) Mirko Bortolotti (Spain) Daniel Juncadella (South Africa) Jordan Pepper	Lamborghini Huracán GT3 Evo 2	126	Did not finish
DNF	SP 8T	189	(Switzerland) Hofor Racing by Bonk Motorsport	(Germany) Michael Bonk (Germany) Peter Bonk (Russia) Marat Khayrov (Germany) Michael Schrey	BMW M4 GT4 (G82)	117	Did not finish
DNF	SP 9 Pro	45	(Japan) Realize Kondo Racing with Rinaldi	(Zimbabwe) Axcil Jefferies (Germany) Felipe Fernandez Laser (France) Thomas Neubauer (South Africa) David Perel	Ferrari 296 GT3	115	Did not finish
DNF	Cup2 Pro	919	(Germany) Clickversicherung.de Team	(Germany) Robin Chrzanowski (Germany) Kersten Jodexnis (Germany) Richard Jodexnis (Germany) Peter Scharmach	Porsche 992 GT3 Cup	103	Did not finish
DNF	Cup2 Pro	927	(Germany) Max Kruse Racing	(Netherlands) Tom Coronel (Netherlands) Paul Meijer (Netherlands) Rudy van Buren (Netherlands) Jan Jaap van Roon	Porsche 992 GT3 Cup	102	Did not finish
DNF	V6	414	(Germany) Köppen Motorsport	(Germany) Alexander Köppen (Poland) Jacek Pydys (Germany) Sebastian Rings (Germany) Andreas Schaflitzl	Porsche 911 Carrera	98	Did not finish
DNF	Cup3 Pro	941	(Germany) Adrenalin Motorsport Team Mainhattan Wheels	(Germany) Daniel Dörrschuck (Japan) Ryusho Konishi (United States) Nico Silva (Germany) Aaron Wenisch	Porsche 718 Cayman GT4 RS Clubsport	95	Did not finish
DNF	SP 9 Pro	44	(Germany) Falken Motorsports	(France) Dorian Boccolacci (Germany) Tim Heinemann (Germany) Dennis Marschall (Netherlands) Morris Schuring	Porsche 911 GT3 R (992)	89	Did not finish
DNF	SP 10	179	(Germany) Dörr Motorsport	(France) Philippe Charlaix (Germany) Heiko Hahn (Germany) Peter Sander (Germany) Rolf Scheibner	Aston Martin Vantage AMR GT4	88	Did not finish
DNF	325i	101	(Germany) EiFelkind Racing	(Sweden) Dan Berghult (Japan) Ryusuke Masumato (Sweden) Jonas Nilsson (Germany) Karsten Welker	BMW 325i Racing	87	Did not finish
DNF	SP 10	74	(Germany) Walkenhorst Motorsport	(Belgium) Aris Balanian (France) Jean-Christophe David (Germany) Joshua Hansen (Germany) Hermann Vortkamp	Aston Martin Vantage AMR GT4 Evo	80	Did not finish
DNF	Cup2 Am	912	(Germany) KKrämer Racing	(Ukraine) Oleksiy Kikireshko (Germany) Karsten Krämer (Latvia) Leo Messenger (Germany) Sascha Steinhardt	Porsche 992 GT3 Cup	79	Did not finish
DNF	AT3	633	(Germany) Four Motors Bioconcept-Car	(Switzerland) Boris Hrubesch (Germany) Alesia Kreutzpointner (Germany) Jacqueline Kreutzpointner (Germany) Luka Wlömer	Porsche 718 Cayman GT4 Clubsport (982)	79	Did not finish
DNF	SP 3T	303	(South Korea) Hyundai Motorsport N	(United States) Jeff Ricca (South Korea) Kim Gyumin (South Korea) Kim Yougchan (China) Zhendong Zhang	Hyundai Elantra N Cup	78	Did not finish
DNF	SP 9 Pro	34	(Germany) Walkenhorst Motorsport	(Italy) Mattia Drudi (Norway) Christian Krognes (United Kingdom) David Pittard (Denmark) Nicki Thiim	Aston Martin Vantage AMR GT3 Evo	72	Did not finish
DNF	Cup2 Pro	929	(Germany) KKrämer Racing	(Germany) Michele di Martino (Germany) Fidel Lieb (Germany) Moritz Oberheim (Germany) Tobias Vazquez-Garcia	Porsche 992 GT3 Cup	71	Did not finish
DNF	SP 10	175	(Germany) PROsport Racing	(Germany) Kelberg Alboretto (Germany) Yannik Himmels (Chile) Benjamín Hites (Germany) Jörg Viebahn	Aston Martin Vantage AMR GT4	69	Did not finish
DNF	VT2 Hecke	268	(Germany) Jaco's Paddock Motorsport GmbH	(Malaysia) Chong Kait Wai (Germany) Andreas Ecker (Japan) Takashi Ito (Japan) Kohta Kawaai	Toyota Supra	63	Did not finish
DNF	SP 7	70	(Germany) Black Falcon Team Zimmermann	(Germany) David Barst (Germany) Anton Ruf (Germany) Axel Sartingen (Germany) Nils Schwenk	Porsche Cayman GT4 RS Clubsport	59	Did not finish
DNF	SP 9 Pro-Am	35	(Germany) Walkenhorst Motorsport	(Germany) Anders Burchardt (Germany) Nico Hantke (Norway) Christian Krognes (Sweden) Oliver Söderström	Aston Martin Vantage AMR GT3 Evo	58	Did not finish
DNF	VT2 Front	488	(Germany) SRS Team Sorg Rennsport	(Germany) Christoph Blümer (Italy) Alberto Carobbio (Germany) Marvin Kobos (Italy) Ugo Vicenzi	BMW 128ti	58	Did not finish
DNF	SP 9 Pro-Am	63	(Germany) HRT Ford Performance	(Germany) Patrick Assenheimer (Germany) Hubert Haupt (Germany) Vincent Kolb (Germany) Dirk Müller	Ford Mustang GT3	52	Did not finish
DNF	SP 3T	300	(Germany) Ollis Garage Racing	(Germany) Martin Kaffka (Germany) Oliver Kriese (Germany) Gregor Starck	Dacia Logan	51	Did not finish
DNF	V6	396	(Germany) Adrenalin Motorsport Team Mainhattan Wheels	(Spain) Carlos Arimón (Germany) Christian Büllesbach (Germany) Klaus Faßbender (Germany) Andreas Schettler	Porsche Cayman S	50	Did not finish
DNF	SP 10	169	(Germany) Dörr Motorsport	(Germany) Phil Dörr (Germany) Peter Posavac (Germany) Sven Schädler (Germany) Frank Weishar	Aston Martin Vantage AMR GT4	49	Did not finish
DNF	SP 8T	140	(Germany) PROsport Racing	(Belgium) Guido Dumarey (Belgium) Maxime Dumarey (Germany) Marcel Marchewicz (Austria) Raphael Rennhofer	Aston Martin Vantage AMR GT4	47	Did not finish
DNF	SP 9 Pro	14	(Germany) Mercedes-AMG Team GetSpeed	(Germany) Maro Engel (Belgium) Maxime Martin (Germany) Fabian Schiller (Germany) Luca Stolz	Mercedes-AMG GT3 Evo	41	Did not finish
DNF	M240i	542	(Germany) Keeevin Sports and Racing	(Germany) Ricardo Petrolo (Germany) Jörg Schönfelder (Germany) Daniel Sowada (Germany) Serge van Vooren	BMW M240i Racing Cup	39	Did not finish
DNF	AT3	10	(Germany) Max Kruse Racing	(Germany) Max Kruse (Switzerland) Christoph Lenz (Switzerland) Armando Stanco (Switzerland) Dario Stanco	Volkswagen Golf 7 GTi TCR DSG	38	Did not finish
DNF	AT3	76	(Germany) Max Kruse Racing	(Germany) Christian Gebhardt (Germany) Timo Hochwind (Switzerland) Jasmin Preisig (Germany) Fabian Vettel	Volkswagen Golf GTI TCR Clubsport 24h	32	Did not finish
DNF	SP 9 Pro	1	(Germany) Scherer Sport PHX	(Germany) Christopher Haase (Germany) Luca Ludwig (Germany) Markus Winkelhock	Audi R8 LMS Evo II	28	Did not finish
DNF	SP 9 Pro	64	(Germany) HRT Ford Performance	(India) Arjun Maini (Norway) Dennis Olsen (Germany) Jusuf Owega (Germany) Frank Stippler	Ford Mustang GT3	27	Did not finish
DNF	Cup 3 Pro	978	(Germany) KKrämer Racing	(South Korea) Jang Han Choi (Germany) John Finken (Germany) Mario Handrick (Germany) Peter Sander	Porsche 718 Cayman GT4 RS Clubsport	26	Did not finish
DNF	SP 9 Pro	33	(Germany) Falken Motorsports	(France) Julien Andlauer (Germany) Nico Menzel (Germany) Sven Müller (Belgium) Alessio Picariello	Porsche 911 GT3 R (992)	23	Did not finish
DNF	SP 9 Am	50	(Germany) équipe vitesse	(Germany) Michael Heimrich (Germany) Arno Klasen (Italy) Lorenzo Rocco Di Torrepadula (Sweden) Eric Ullström	Audi R8 LMS Evo II	21	Did not finish
DNF	M240i	677	(Germany) asBest Racing	(Switzerland) Thomas Alpiger (Switzerland) Michael Neuhauser (Germany) Henrik Seibel (Germany) Sebastian Tauber	BMW M240i Racing Cup	21	Did not finish
DNF	Cup 2 Pro	94	(Germany) Sante Royale Racing Team	(Germany) David Kiefer (Germany) Marius Kiefer (Germany) Stefan Kiefer (Austria) Luca Rettenbacher	Porsche 911 GT3 Cup (992)	20	Did not finish
DNF	SP 10 Am	111	(Germany) SR Motorsport by Schnitzelalm	(Germany) Tim Neuser (Germany) Reinhold Renger (United States) David Thilenius (Germany) Guido Wirtz	Mercedes-AMG GT4	15	Did not finish
DNF	Cup 3 Am	959	(Germany) SRS Team Sorg Rennsport	(United Kingdom) Peter Cate (Germany) Heiko Eichenberg (United Kingdom) Harley Haughton (Germany) Björn Simon	Porsche 718 Cayman GT4 RS Clubsport	12	Did not finish
DNF	VT2 Hecka	505	(Germany) Time Attack Paderborn	(Germany) Fritz Hebig (Denmark) Kaj Schubert (Germany) Fabian Tillmann (Germany) Michael Wolpertinger	BMW 328i (F30)	10	Did not finish
DNF	SP 10 Am	170	(Germany) Toyo Tires with Ring Racing	(Japan) Takayuki Kinoshita (Germany) Michael Tischner (Germany) Heiko Tönges	Toyota Supra GT4 Evo	10	Did not finish
DNF	Cup 3 Am	945	(Thailand) Renazzo Motorsport Team	(Germany) Otto Klohs (Germany) Daniel Nölken (Germany) Marksu Nölken (Japan) Kouichi Okumura	Porsche 718 Cayman GT4 RS Clubsport	9	Did not finish
DNF	SP-Pro	347	(Germany) Toyo Tires with Ring Racing	(Germany) Andreas Gülden (Germany) Marc Hennerici (Germany) Tim Sandtler	Porsche 911 GT3 Cup MR	0	Did not finish
DNS	SP7	778	(Germany) RPM Racing	(Germany) Philip Hamprecht (Germany) Lukas Mösgen	Porsche 991 GT3 II Cup	0	Did not start
WD	SP 9 Pro	16	(Germany) Scherer Sport PHX	(Switzerland) Ricardo Feller (Switzerland) Patric Niederhauser (Belgium) Laurens Vanthoor (France) Patrick Pilet	Porsche 911 GT3 R	0	Withdrew
Official results

- **^1** – Car #911 received a 1 minute 40 seconds time penalty for causing a collision.

== Bibliography ==
- Jörg-Richard Ufer & Tim Upietz. 24 Stunden Nürburgring Nordschleife 2025. Gruppe C Motorsport Verlag. ISBN 978-3-948501-40-2.

Intercontinental GT Challenge
Previous race: 2025 Bathurst 12 Hour	2025 season	Next race: 2025 24 Hours of Spa
