= 2006 Formula 3 Euro Series =

Motorsport season

The 2006 Formula 3 Euro Series season was the fourth championship year of Europe’s premier Formula Three series. As in previous years, there were ten rounds – each with two races – held at a variety of European circuits. Each weekend consisted of one 60-minute practice session and one qualifying session, followed by one c.110 km race and one c.80 km race. In a revised qualifying system that used only one session, the starting order for race 2 was determined by the finishing order of race 1, with the top eight positions reversed.

== Summary ==
2006 saw the Euro Series make its debut at three venues: Brands Hatch in the UK, the Circuit de Catalunya near Barcelona in Spain, and Le Mans. This was the first time that rounds had been held in Britain and Spain.

A number of regulatory changes took place prior to the 2006 season. Mid-season testing was heavily restricted to a maximum of 10 days per driver/car, with no testing at race venues, leaving teams and drivers to make the most of the race weekend test sessions. The qualifying session for race 2 was dropped in favour of a result-based reverse grid system. The finishing order of race 1 decided the grid for race 2, with the top eight finishers reversed. Chassis specifications of between two and four years old (from 2002–2004) were permitted for the first time, with the creation of the Drivers' Trophy title. Eligibility for this award was restricted to drivers who were not more than 22 years old.

After Lewis Hamilton's domination of the 2005 season, the 2006 championship battle was considerably closer. The title was won by Scotsman Paul di Resta, who ended the year 11 points ahead of Germany's Sebastian Vettel. For much of the season, di Resta and Vettel were exchanging the points lead, but the German's focus wavered towards the end of the year. BMW-Sauber's motorsport director Mario Theissen attributed this to the busy schedule that Vettel undertook as his team's test driver in the last three Grands Prix of the 2006 F1 season. Other drivers worthy of note included Kamui Kobayashi, who finished on the podium twice on the way to winning the Rookie Cup, and race winner Kazuki Nakajima, whose performances attracted a testing contract with Williams.

Not surprisingly, the two main championship contenders were team-mates at ASM Formule 3, the French-based team that has dominated the Euro Series for the last three seasons with three Drivers' and Teams' Championship titles in succession. 2006 saw another improvement in form from Manor Motorsport – a former multiple champion team in British F3. With Japan's Kohei Hirate and the experienced Esteban Guerrieri, it was frequently ASM's closest challenger and finished 2nd in the Teams' Championship standings. This year, Manor was no longer the sole British team in the Euroseries – it was joined by entries from Hitech Racing and Fortec Motorsport at Hockenheim (round 1) and Brands Hatch (round 4).

With only one race win for an Opel-powered car – from a reverse-grid pole position – it was another season of domination by the HWA-built Mercedes engine. Dallara was the de facto sole supplier of chassis, with the Signature SLC project on indefinite hold and the Mygale chassis still yet to race in this series.

== Teams and drivers ==
2006 Entry List
Team	#	Driver	Rookie	Chassis (Note: All drivers competed in Dallara chassis; model listed.)	Engine	Rounds
(France) ASM Formule 3	1	(Germany) Sebastian Vettel		F305/059	Mercedes	All
(France) ASM Formule 3	2	(United Kingdom) Paul di Resta		F305/021	Mercedes	All
(France) ASM Formule 3	16	(Netherlands) Giedo van der Garde		F306/012	Mercedes	All
(France) ASM Formule 3	17	(Japan) Kamui Kobayashi	R	F305/012	Mercedes	All
(United Kingdom) Manor Motorsport	3	(Japan) Kohei Hirate		F305/001	Mercedes	All
(United Kingdom) Manor Motorsport	4	(Argentina) Esteban Guerrieri		F305/020	Mercedes	All
(United Kingdom) Manor Motorsport	18	(Japan) Kazuki Nakajima		F305/062	Mercedes	All
(Italy) Prema Powerteam	5	(Spain) Alejandro Núñez		F306/004	Mercedes	All
(Italy) Prema Powerteam	6	(Republic of Ireland) Ronayne O'Mahony		F305/023	Mercedes	All
(Italy) Prema Powerteam	19	(Portugal) João Urbano	R	F306/005	Mercedes	1–5
(Italy) Prema Powerteam	19	(Italy) Paolo Maria Nocera		F306/005	Mercedes	6–9
(Italy) Prema Powerteam	19	(Brazil) Roberto Streit		F306/005	Mercedes	10
(Germany) ASL Mücke Motorsport	7	(Switzerland) Sébastien Buemi		F305/011	Mercedes	All
(Germany) ASL Mücke Motorsport	8	(United States) Jonathan Summerton	R	F305/028	Mercedes	All
(France) Signature-Plus	9	(France) Guillaume Moreau		F305/035	Mercedes	All
(France) Signature-Plus	10	(France) Romain Grosjean		F305/029	Mercedes	All
(France) Signature-Plus	20	(United States) Charlie Kimball		F306/010	Mercedes	All
(France) Signature-Plus	21	(Germany) Tim Sandtler	R	F305/036	Mercedes	All
(Austria) HBR Motorsport	11	(United States) Richard Antinucci		F305/045	Mercedes	All
(Czech Republic) Team ISR	14	(Czech Republic) Filip Salaquarda		F306/009	Opel	All
(Belgium) Bas Leinders Junior Racing Team	22	(Monaco) Michael Herck (Note: Herck is a Romanian driver who raced this year under Monegasque racing license.)		F306/016	Mercedes	All
(Switzerland) Jo Zeller Racing	24	(Germany) Peter Elkmann		F306/014	Opel	1–7
(Switzerland) Jo Zeller Racing	24	(Switzerland) Natacha Gachnang		F306/014	Opel	9–10
(Germany) Julia Kuhn	25	(Germany) Julia Kuhn		F305/063	Opel	1–2, 4, 6
(United Kingdom) Fortec Motorsport	26	(Netherlands) Yelmer Buurman		F305/002	Mercedes	1, 4
(United Kingdom) Hitech Racing	29	(United Kingdom) James Jakes		F305/037	Mercedes	1, 4
(United Kingdom) Hitech Racing	30	(United Kingdom) James Walker		F305/003	Mercedes	1, 4
(Switzerland) Bordoli Motorsport	31	(Switzerland) Natacha Gachnang		F305/026	Opel	5–6
(Netherlands) Van Amersfoort Racing	32	(Netherlands) Dominick Muermans		F306/023	Opel	7
(Netherlands) Van Amersfoort Racing	33	(South Korea) Récardo Bruins Choi		F305/046	Opel	7
Trophy
(France) Janiec Racing Team	40	(France) Anthony Janiec		F302/063	Renault	1, 3, 5–7, 9–10
(France) Janiec Racing Team	46	(France) Julien Abelli		F302/067	Renault	9
(Austria) HBR Motorsport	41	(Turkey) Cemil Çipa		F304/012	Opel	1, 3, 5–7, 9–10
(Germany) SMS Seyffarth Motorsport	42	(Germany) Kevin Fank		F302/032	Mercedes	1
(Germany) SMS Seyffarth Motorsport	42	(Germany) Gina-Maria Adenauer		F302/032	Mercedes	5
(Germany) SMS Seyffarth Motorsport	43	(Germany) Julian Theobald		F303/015	Mercedes	1, 3, 5–7
(Germany) SMS Seyffarth Motorsport	44	(Germany) Bruno Fechner		F302/012	Mercedes	1, 6–7
(Germany) SMS Seyffarth Motorsport	44	(Germany) Dominik Schraml		F302/012	Mercedes	3
(Germany) FS Motorsport	45	(Germany) Dominik Schraml		F302/050	Opel	5

Icon	Legend
R	Rookie

=== Driver changes ===
Changed Teams

- Richard Antinucci: Team Midland Euroseries → HBR Motosport
- Giedo van der Garde: Team Rosberg → ASM Formule 3
- Esteban Guerrieri: Team Midland Euroseries → Manor Motosport
- Kohei Hirate: Team Rosberg → Manor Motosport
- Paul di Resta: Manor Motorsport → ASM Formule 3
- Sebastian Vettel: Mücke Motorsport → ASM Formule 3

Entering/Re-Entering Formula 3 Euro Series

- Richard Antinucci: All-Japan Formula Three Championship (TOM'S) → HBR Motorsport
- Récardo Bruins Choi: Formula Renault 2.0 Germany & Formula Renault 2.0 Netherlands (van Amersfoort Racing) → van Amersfoort Racing
- Sébastien Buemi: Formula BMW ADAC (ADAC Berlin-Brandenburg e.V.) → ASL Mücke Motorsport
- Yelmer Buurman: Formula Renault 2.0 UK (Fortec Motorsport) → Fortec Motorsport
- Peter Elkmann: Recaro Formel 3 Cup (Jo Zeller Racing) → Jo Zeller Racing
- Natacha Gachnang: Formula BMW ADAC (Josef Kaufmann Racing) → Bordoli Motorsport
- Romain Grosjean: Championnat de France Formula Renault 2.0 & Eurocup Formula Renault 2.0 (SG Formula) → Signature-Plus
- Michael Herck: British Formula 3 Championship & Austria Formula 3 Cup (Junior Racing Team) → Bas Leinders Junior Racing Team
- James Jakes: Formula Renault 2.0 UK (Team aka) → Hitech Racing
- Charlie Kimball: British Formula 3 Championship (Carlin Motorsport) → Signature-Plus
- Kamui Kobayashi: Formula Renault 2.0 Italy & Eurocup Formula Renault 2.0 (Prema Powerteam) → ASM Formule 3
- Dominick Muermans: Formula Renault 2.0 Germany & Formula Renault 2.0 Netherlands (van Amersfoort Racing) → van Amersfoort Racing
- Kazuki Nakajima: All-Japan Formula Three Championship (TOM'S) → Manor Motorsport
- Paolo Maria Nocera: Italian Formula Three Championship (Lucidi Motors) → Prema Powerteam
- Ronayne O'Mahony: British Formula 3 Championship (Fortec Motorsport) → Prema Powerteam
- Filip Salaquarda: Recaro Formel 3 Cup (ISR Racing) → Team I.S.R.
- Tim Sandtler: Formula BMW ADAC (Mamerow Racing) → Signature Plus
- Roberto Streit: All-Japan Formula Three Championship (Inging) → Prema Powerteam
- Jonathan Summerton: Formula BMW ADAC (Team Rosberg) → ASL Mücke Motorsport
- João Urbano: Formula BMW ADAC (ADAC Berlin-Brandenburg e.V.) → Prema Powerteam
- James Walker: British Formula 3 Championship (Fortec Motorsport) → Hitech Racing

Entering Trophy Class

- Julien Abelli: Karting → Janiec Racing Team
- Gina-Maria Adenauer: Toyota Yaris Cup Germany → SMS Seyffarth Motorsport
- Cemil Çipa: Formula 3 Turkey → HBR Motorsport
- Kevin Fank: Recaro Formel 3 Cup Trophy Class (JMS Motorsport) → SMS Seyffarth Motorsport
- Bruno Fechner: Formula Renault 2.0 Germany (Kern Motorsport) → SMS Seyffarth Motorsport
- Anthony Janiec: French Formula Three Championship Class B (JMP Racing) → Janiec Racing Team
- Dominik Schraml: Recaro Formel 3 Cup (Swiss Racing Team) → SMS Seyffarth Motorsport

Leaving Formula 3 Euro Series

- Átila Abreu: Mücke Motorsport → StockCar Brasil (RS Competições)
- Rob Austin: Team Midland Euroseries → SEAT Cupra Great Britain R class (Startline Services)
- Marco Bonanomi: Prema Powerteam → Euroseries 3000 (Fisichella Motor Sport) & World Series by Renault (Tech 1 Racing)
- Fabio Carbone: Signature → All-Japan Formula Three Championship (Three Bond Racing)
- Ben Clucas: Team Midland Euroseries → Australian Formula 3 (Bronte Rundle Motorsport)
- Loïc Duval: Signature Plus → Formula Nippon (PIAA Nakajima Racing) & Super GT (Nakajima Racing)
- Gregory Franchi: Prema Powerteam → World Series by Renault (Prema Powerteam)
- Maximilian Götz: ASM Formule 3 → International Formula Master (ISR Racing)
- Lucas di Grassi: Manor Motorsport → GP2 Series (Durango)
- Lewis Hamilton: ASM Formule 3 → GP2 Series (ART Grand Prix)
- Thomas Holzer: AM-Holzer Rennsport → Retirement
- Stephen Jelley: Team Midland Euroseries → British Formula 3 Championship (Räikkönen Robertson Racing)
- Paolo Montin: Ombra Racing → Porsche Carrera Cup Italy (Bonaldi Motorsport)
- Hannes Neuhauser: HBR Motorsport → Porsche Supercup (Konrad Motorsport)
- Alejandro Núñez: HBR Motorsport → Prema Powerteam
- Franck Perera: Prema Powerteam → GP2 Series (DAMS)
- James Rossiter: Signature Plus → World Series by Renault (Pons Racing)
- Adrian Sutil: ASM Formule 3 → All-Japan Formula Three Championship (TOM's)
- Nico Verdonck: Team Midland Euroseries → Spanish Formula Three by Toyota (R. Llusia Racing)
- Ross Zwolsman: RZ Racing → ATS Formel 3 Cup (Rennsport Rössler)
- Danny Watts: HBR Motorsport → Porsche Carrera Cup Great Britain (Red Line Racing)

==== Additional participations ====
Prema Powerteam's third entry was taken over by Italy's Paulo Maria Nocera for four rounds, starting at the Nürburgring. He in turn was replaced by Brazil's Roberto Streit at the final round of the season. Bruno Rudolf Fechner started five races in SMS Seyffarth Motorsport's #44 entry, but was substituted by fellow German Dominik Schraml in round 3 at Oschersleben. The #44 car was not present at every round. Schraml made a one-off return at the Norisring, driving a Dallara-Opel for FS Motorsport. Kevin Fank's #42 SMS Seyffarth Motorsport entry returned at the Norisring in the hands of Gina Maria Adenauer before it, too, failed to make another appearance. Like the drivers that they replaced, Schraml and Adenauer were eligible for the Drivers' Trophy. Julien Abelli, of Janiec Racing, did not make any appearances until the Le Mans round.

In round 5 at the Norisring, F3 rookie Natacha Gachnang of Switzerland drove a second entry for Jo Zeller Racing. She also competed in rounds 6, 9, and 10. In the F3 Masters at Zandvoort, ATS F3 Cup team Van Amersfoort Racing made a one-off appearance with two cars for its Cup regulars, Dominik Muermans and Récardo Bruins Choi.

== Calendar ==
- The series supported the Deutsche Tourenwagen Masters at all rounds.

Round		Circuit/Location	Country	Date
1	R1	Hockenheimring	Germany	8 April
1	R2	Hockenheimring	Germany	9 April
2	R1	EuroSpeedway Lausitz	Germany	29 April
2	R2	EuroSpeedway Lausitz	Germany	30 April
3	R1	Motorsport Arena Oschersleben	Germany	20 May
3	R2	Motorsport Arena Oschersleben	Germany	21 May
4	R1	Brands Hatch	United Kingdom	1 July
4	R2	Brands Hatch	United Kingdom	2 July
5	R1	Norisring, Nuremberg	Germany	22 July
5	R2	Norisring, Nuremberg	Germany	23 July
6	R1	Nürburgring	Germany	19 August
6	R2	Nürburgring	Germany	20 August
7	R1	Circuit Park Zandvoort	Netherlands	2 September
7	R2	Circuit Park Zandvoort	Netherlands	3 September
8	R1	Circuit de Catalunya	Spain	23 September
8	R2	Circuit de Catalunya	Spain	24 September
9	R1	Bugatti Circuit, Le Mans	France	14 October
9	R2	Bugatti Circuit, Le Mans	France	15 October
10	R1	Hockenheimring	Germany	28 October
10	R2	Hockenheimring	Germany	29 October

== Results ==
Round		Circuit	Pole position	Fastest lap	Winning driver	Winning team	Winning rookie	Trophy winner
1	R1	(Germany) Hockenheimring	(Argentina) Esteban Guerrieri	(Japan) Kazuki Nakajima	(Japan) Kohei Hirate	(United Kingdom) Manor Motorsport	(Japan) Kamui Kobayashi	(Germany) Julian Theobald
1	R2	(Germany) Hockenheimring		(Japan) Kohei Hirate	(Germany) Sebastian Vettel	(France) ASM Formule 3	(Japan) Kamui Kobayashi	(Germany) Julian Theobald
2	R1	(Germany) EuroSpeedway Lausitz	(United Kingdom) Paul di Resta	(Japan) Kohei Hirate	(Argentina) Esteban Guerrieri	(United Kingdom) Manor Motorsport	(United States) Jonathan Summerton	
2	R2	(Germany) EuroSpeedway Lausitz		(Japan) Kazuki Nakajima	(Japan) Kazuki Nakajima	(United Kingdom) Manor Motorsport	(United States) Jonathan Summerton	
3	R1	(Germany) Motorsport Arena Oschersleben	(Argentina) Esteban Guerrieri	(Germany) Peter Elkmann	(United Kingdom) Paul di Resta	(France) ASM Formule 3	(Japan) Kamui Kobayashi	(Germany) Julian Theobald
3	R2	(Germany) Motorsport Arena Oschersleben		(Switzerland) Sébastien Buemi	(Switzerland) Sébastien Buemi	(Germany) ASL Mücke Motorsport	(Japan) Kamui Kobayashi	(Germany) Julian Theobald
4	R1	(United Kingdom) Brands Hatch	(United Kingdom) Paul di Resta	(United Kingdom) Paul di Resta	(United Kingdom) Paul di Resta	(France) ASM Formule 3	(Japan) Kamui Kobayashi	
4	R2	(United Kingdom) Brands Hatch		(Germany) Sebastian Vettel	(Germany) Peter Elkmann	(Switzerland) Jo Zeller Racing	(Japan) Kamui Kobayashi	
5	R1	(Germany) Norisring	(Netherlands) Giedo van der Garde	(Germany) Sebastian Vettel	(United Kingdom) Paul di Resta	(France) ASM Formule 3	(United States) Jonathan Summerton	(Germany) Gina-Maria Adenauer
5	R2	(Germany) Norisring		(Switzerland) Sébastien Buemi	(Netherlands) Giedo van der Garde	(France) ASM Formule 3	(Japan) Kamui Kobayashi	(France) Anthony Janiec
6	R1	(Germany) Nürburgring	(Germany) Sebastian Vettel	(Germany) Sebastian Vettel	(Germany) Sebastian Vettel	(France) ASM Formule 3	(Japan) Kamui Kobayashi	(Germany) Bruno Fechner
6	R2	(Germany) Nürburgring		(Japan) Kamui Kobayashi	(Germany) Sebastian Vettel	(France) ASM Formule 3	(Japan) Kamui Kobayashi	(Germany) Julian Theobald
7	R1	(Netherlands) Circuit Park Zandvoort	(United Kingdom) Paul di Resta	(Switzerland) Sébastien Buemi	(United Kingdom) Paul di Resta	(France) ASM Formule 3	(Japan) Kamui Kobayashi	(Germany) Bruno Fechner
7	R2	(Netherlands) Circuit Park Zandvoort		(Germany) Sebastian Vettel	(United States) Charlie Kimball	(France) Signature-Plus	(Germany) Tim Sandtler	(Germany) Julian Theobald
8	R1	(Spain) Circuit de Catalunya	(United Kingdom) Paul di Resta	(Germany) Sebastian Vettel	(Germany) Sebastian Vettel	(France) ASM Formule 3	(Japan) Kamui Kobayashi	
8	R2	(Spain) Circuit de Catalunya		(Japan) Kohei Hirate	(United States) Richard Antinucci	(Austria) HBR Motorsport	(Germany) Tim Sandtler	
9	R1	(France) Bugatti Circuit	(Netherlands) Giedo van der Garde	(Argentina) Esteban Guerrieri	(United Kingdom) Paul di Resta	(France) ASM Formule 3	(United States) Jonathan Summerton	(Turkey) Cemil Çipa
9	R2	(France) Bugatti Circuit		(Switzerland) Sébastien Buemi	(United States) Richard Antinucci	(Austria) HBR Motorsport	(United States) Jonathan Summerton	(France) Julien Abelli
10	R1	(Germany) Hockenheimring	(United Kingdom) Paul di Resta	(Switzerland) Sébastien Buemi	(Argentina) Esteban Guerrieri	(United Kingdom) Manor Motorsport	(United States) Jonathan Summerton	(France) Anthony Janiec
10	R2	(Germany) Hockenheimring		(Switzerland) Sébastien Buemi	(United States) Jonathan Summerton	(Germany) ASL Mücke Motorsport	(United States) Jonathan Summerton	(Turkey) Cemil Çipa

== Season standings ==
The Drivers' Trophy is restricted to drivers who are not more than 22 years old, using chassis specifications that are 2 to 4 years old.

=== Drivers Standings ===
- Points are awarded as follows:

	1	2	3	4	5	6	7	8	PP
Race 1	10	8	6	5	4	3	2	1	**1**
Race 2	6	5	4	3	2	1	0		0

Pos	Driver	HOC1 (Germany)		LAU (Germany)		OSC (Germany)		BRH (United Kingdom)		NOR (Germany)		NÜR (Germany)		ZAN (Netherlands)		CAT (Spain)		LMS (France)		HOC2 (Germany)		Pts
1	(United Kingdom) Paul di Resta	3	Ret	**2**	3	1	12	**1**	5	1	18†	2	13	**1**	14	**10**	6	1	6	**10**	6	86
2	(Germany) Sebastian Vettel	5	1	3	6	5	14	2	7	2	Ret	**1**	1	24†	2	1	Ret	9	9	3	12	75
3	(Japan) Kohei Hirate	1	4	18†	11	4	2	DNS	17	4	Ret	5	Ret	3	13	2	4	5	3	5	7	61
4	(Argentina) Esteban Guerrieri	**14**	3	1	5	**2**	3	16	12	10	DNS	Ret	5	8	4	3	7	6	8	1	4	58
5	(United States) Richard Antinucci	7	DNS	5	2	9	Ret	3	23†	DSQ	EX	7	2	14	16	8	1	8	1	12	8	38
6	(Netherlands) Giedo van der Garde	Ret	7	12	9	Ret	11	4	19	**6**	1	3	11	2	5	16	8	**DNS**	12	9	2	37
7	(Japan) Kazuki Nakajima	2	6	8	1	6	5	14	13	Ret	5	9	18	22	3	4	3	11	7	Ret	DNS	36
8	(Japan) Kamui Kobayashi	6	5	11	10	11	7	6	3	5	2	8	3	5	Ret	5	Ret	DNS	14	Ret	9	34
9	(United States) Jonathan Summerton	Ret	11	4	7	17	Ret	12	10	3	13	24†	16	6	17	Ret	Ret	2	4	8	1	32
10	(France) Guillaume Moreau	4	2	7	Ret	8	4	13	20	18†	6	11	Ret	7	7	9	10	3	5	4	Ret	32
11	(United States) Charlie Kimball	22†	12	9	8	10	Ret	15	11	13	4	10	6	11	1	6	2	4	2	6	Ret	31
12	(Switzerland) Sébastien Buemi	19	14	Ret	12	7	1	21	16	7	11	4	8	Ret	8	7	5	DSQ	11	2	3	31
13	(France) Romain Grosjean	21†	13	6	4	3	6	9	6	12	8	18	10	4	11	NC	9	20	10	DSQ	DSQ	19
14	(Germany) Peter Elkmann	12	21	13	18	21	13	8	1	9	3	12	4	10	9							14
15	(Monaco) Michael Herck	Ret	16	Ret	14	Ret	DNS	7	2	Ret	10	6	Ret	9	23	12	Ret	7	13	11	Ret	12
16	(United Kingdom) James Jakes	9	8					5	4													7
17	(Brazil) Roberto Streit																			7	5	4
18	(Germany) Tim Sandtler	15	22†	16	16	16	17	Ret	22	19†	9	13	9	13	6	11	11	10	15	18	15	1
19	(Portugal) João Urbano	11	9	10	13	12	9	19	24	8	Ret											1
20	(Netherlands) Yelmer Buurman	8	Ret					11	9													1
21	(Spain) Alejandro Núñez	10	10	19	17†	13	8	18	15	Ret	7	22	21	12	22	13	12	14	16	14	Ret	0
22	(Czech Republic) Filip Salaquarda	Ret	15	14	Ret	14	10	20	18	14	17†	15	7	15	10	15	Ret	16	18	Ret	11	0
23	(United Kingdom) James Walker	20†	Ret					10	8													0
24	(Switzerland) Natacha Gachnang									15	DNS	23	15					12	Ret	13	10	0
25	(Republic of Ireland) Ronayne O’Mahony	Ret	17	15	15	15	15	17	14	11	12	14	22†	23†	19	14	Ret	13	17	15	13	0
26	(Italy) Paolo Maria Nocera											Ret	12	17	Ret	Ret	Ret	15	19			0
27	(South Korea) Récardo Bruins Choi													16	12							0
28	(Germany) Julia Kuhn	DNQ	DNQ	17	Ret			22	21			20	20									0
29	(Netherlands) Dominick Muermans													Ret	20							0
Trophy Class
1	(Germany) Julian Theobald	13	18			**18**	16			17	15	**17**	14	19	15							73
2	(France) Anthony Janiec	16	19			Ret	20			Ret	14	19	17	21	DNS			19	21	16	16	67
3	(Turkey) Cemil Çipa	18	20			19	18			Ret	DNS	21	19	20	21			**17**	Ret	**17**	14	65
4	(Germany) Bruno Fechner	**Ret**	DNS									16	Ret	**18**	18							25
5	(Germany) Gina-Maria Adenauer									16	16											14
6	(Germany) Dominik Schraml					20	19			**DSQ**	Ret											10
7	(Germany) Kevin Fank	17	Ret																			6
guest drivers ineligible for championship points
	(France) Julien Abelli																	18	20			0
Pos	Driver	HOC1 (Germany)		LAU (Germany)		OSC (Germany)		BRH (United Kingdom)		NOR (Germany)		NÜR (Germany)		ZAN (Netherlands)		CAT (Spain)		LMS (France)		HOC2 (Germany)		Pts

Colour	Result
Gold	Winner
Silver	Second place
Bronze	Third place
Green	Points classification
Blue	Non-points classification
Blue	Non-classified finish (NC)
Purple	Retired, not classified (Ret)
Red	Did not qualify (DNQ)
Red	Did not pre-qualify (DNPQ)
Black	Disqualified (DSQ)
White	Did not start (DNS)
White	Withdrew (WD)
White	Race cancelled (C)
Blank	Did not practice (DNP)
Blank	Did not arrive (DNA)
Blank	Excluded (EX)

**Bold** – Pole
Italics – Fastest Lap

† — Drivers did not finish the race, but were classified as they completed over 90% of the race distance.

The effects of the new reverse-grid system – which put the 8th-placed finisher from race 1 on pole for race 2 – can be seen clearly in this chart. 50% of the race 2 pole sitters went on to win, while there was only one double winner (Vettel in round 6) and no other race 1 winner even reached the podium in race 2.

=== Rookie Cup ===
Rookie drivers are only eligible for the Rookie Cup title if they have not previously competed in a national or international Formula 3 championship.

Pos	Driver	HOC1 (Germany)		LAU (Germany)		OSC (Germany)		BRH (United Kingdom)		NOR (Germany)		NÜR (Germany)		ZAN (Netherlands)		CAT (Spain)		LMS (France)		HOC2 (Germany)		Pts
1	(Japan) Kamui Kobayashi	6	5	11	10	11	7	6	3	5	2	8	3	5	Ret	5	Ret	DNS	14	Ret	9	119
2	(United States) Jonathan Summerton	Ret	11	4	7	17	Ret	12	10	3	13	24	16	6	17	Ret	Ret	2	4	8	1	107
3	(Germany) Tim Sandtler	15	22	16	16	16	17	Ret	22	19	9	13	9	13	6	11	11	10	15	18	15	104
4	(Portugal) João Urbano	11	9	10	13	12	9	19	24	8	Ret											53
Pos	Driver	HOC1 (Germany)		LAU (Germany)		OSC (Germany)		BRH (United Kingdom)		NOR (Germany)		NÜR (Germany)		ZAN (Netherlands)		CAT (Spain)		LMS (France)		HOC2 (Germany)		Pts

=== Team Standings ===
	Team	Points
1	(France) ASM Formule 3	197
2	(United Kingdom) Manor Motorsport	147
3	(France) Signature-Plus	91
4	(Germany) ASL Mücke Motorsport	69
5	(Austria) HBR Motorsport	42
6	(Switzerland) Jo Zeller Racing	18
7	(Belgium) Bas Leinders Junior Racing Team	16
8	(United Kingdom) Hitech Racing	11
9	(Italy) Prema Powerteam	7
10	(United Kingdom) Fortec Motorsport	2

=== Nations Cup ===
	Nation	Points
1	Japan	124
2	United States	100
3	Great Britain	90
4	Germany	89
5	Argentina	56
6	France	53
7	Netherlands	38
8	Switzerland	32
9	Monaco	12
10	Brazil	4
11	Portugal	1
