= 2005 German Formula Three Championship =

Seasons
- ← 2004 2006 →

The 2005 ATS Formel 3 Cup was a multi-event motor racing championship for single-seat open wheel formula racing cars that held across Europe. The championship featured drivers competing in two-litre Formula Three racing cars built by Dallara which conform to the technical regulations, or formula, for the championship. It was the third edition of the ATS F3 Cup. It commenced on 23 April at Oschersleben and ended on 9 October at the same place after nine double-header rounds.

Jo Zeller Racing driver Peter Elkmann clinched the championship title. He collected six wins, to overcome his closest rival Michael Devaney by 49 points, who won five races. The third place went to Ho-Pin Tung, who was victorious at both the opening and final race of the season at Oschersleben. Seyffarth Motorsport Pascal Kochem didn't achieve a race win but had eight podiums and won the Rookie Cup. Frank Kechele, who completed the top-five, lost eight points to Kochem in both main and rookie standings. Other wins were shared between Martin Hippe, Ferdinand Kool and Jan Seyffarth, who clinched both the Trophy and Rookie titles.

== Teams and drivers ==
All drivers competed in Dallara chassis; model listed.

Team	No.	Driver	Chassis	Engine	Status	Rounds
Cup Class
(Austria) HS Technik Motorsport	1	(Belgium) Maxime Hodencq	F302/033	Opel	R	1
(Austria) HS Technik Motorsport	1	(Republic of Ireland) Michael Devaney	F303/007	Opel		2–9
(Austria) HS Technik Motorsport	2	(Germany) Martin Hippe	F303/026	Opel	R	All
(Austria) HS Technik Motorsport	33	(Latvia) Harald Schlegelmilch	F302/033	Opel	R	8–9
(Switzerland) Jo Zeller Racing	3	(Germany) Peter Elkmann	F302/073	Opel		All
(Belgium) JB Motorsport	5	(Netherlands) Ferdinand Kool	F302/010	Opel	R	All
(Belgium) JB Motorsport	6	(China) Ho-Pin Tung	F302/072	Opel		All
(Germany) FS Motorsport	10	(Germany) Frank Kechele	F302/050	Mercedes	R	1–8
(Germany) FS Motorsport	11	(Germany) Franz Schmöller	F302/050	Mercedes		All
(Netherlands) Van Amersfoort Racing	12	(Netherlands) Paul Meijer	F302/084	Opel	R	1
(Germany) Seyffarth Motorsport	15	(Germany) Pascal Kochem	F302/012	Mercedes	R	All
(Germany) Seyffarth Motorsport	16	(Germany) Roberth Kath	F302/032	Mercedes		1–3
(Germany) Seyffarth Motorsport	16	(Germany) Jan Seyffarth	F302/032	Mercedes		8
(Germany) Seyffarth Motorsport	17	(Germany) Jochen Nerpel	F303/015	Mercedes		2–5
(Germany) Seyffarth Motorsport	18	(Germany) Julian Theobald	F303/015	Mercedes	R	All
(Germany) Seyffarth Motorsport	19	(Germany) Johannes Theobald	F302/032	Mercedes	R	1–3, 5–7, 9
(Germany) Leipert Motorsport	20	(Germany) Norman Knop	F302/005	Opel	R	All
(Germany) Leipert Motorsport	21	(Germany) Marcel Leipert	F302/060	Renault		8
(Germany) Leipert Motorsport	32	(Italy) Luca Iannaccone	F302/021	Renault		8
(Germany) Rennsport Rössler	22	(Austria) Manuel Taxacher	F303/022	Opel	R	2
(Germany) Rennsport Rössler	22	(Germany) Thomas Rössler	F303/022	Opel		5
(Austria) Franz Wöss Racing	23	(Germany) Sven Barth	F302/087	Opel		5
(Austria) Franz Wöss Racing	23	(Austria) Franz Wöss	F302/087	Opel		8
(Austria) Franz Wöss Racing	23	(Germany) Christopher Kuntz	F302/087	Opel	R	9
(Germany) FBR	24	(Germany) Frank Brendecke	F302/084	Opel		1, 4
(Austria) Petutschnig Engineering	25	(Austria) Christopher Wassermann	F303/022	Opel	R	1
(Germany) Prinz Schwadtke	26	(Germany) Ronny Wechselberger	F302/040	Opel	R	4, 8
(Belgium) Junior Racing Team	26	(Monaco) Michael Herck	F305/005	Opel		1, 5
(Switzerland) Swiss Racing Team	29	(Germany) Dominik Schraml	F302/011	Opel	R	1–7, 9
(Switzerland) Swiss Racing Team	30	(Switzerland) Radi Müller	F302/061	Opel		2, 4–6, 9
(France) Griffith's	31	(France) Patrick d' Aubreby	F302/029	Opel		2
(Italy) Corbetta Competizioni	34	(Italy) Davide Valsecchi	F302/051	Opel		7
(Czech Republic) KFR Team F3	34	(Czech Republic) Petr Samek	F302/044	Opel		9
(Luxembourg) Team Midland Euroseries	36	(Germany) Frank Kechele	F302/044	Toyota	R	9
Trophy Class
(United Kingdom) Edenbridge Racing	38	(China) Lou Meng Cheong	F302/044	Mugen-Honda	R	6–7
(Sweden) Performance Racing	39	(Pakistan) Adam Langley-Khan	F302/048	Mugen-Honda		4
(Germany) JMS Motorsport	51	(Germany) Kevin Fank	F302/084	Opel		1–7, 9
(Germany) JMS Motorsport	52	(Germany) Christer Jöns	F302/084	Opel	R	1–7, 9
(Austria) Franz Wöss Racing	54	(Germany) Florian Schnitzenbaumer	F399/072	Opel		1–6
(Austria) Franz Wöss Racing	55	(Germany) Christopher Kuntz	F301/016	Opel	R	1–7
(Austria) Franz Wöss Racing	55	(Italy) Diego Romanini	F301/016	Opel		9
(Germany) Rennsport Rössler	57	(Italy) Luca Iannaccone	F301/031	Opel		1–7, 9
(Switzerland) Jo Zeller Racing	59	(Switzerland) Urs Rüttimann	F301/006	Opel		2, 6
(Switzerland) Jo Zeller Racing	60	(Switzerland) Daniel Roider	F399/051	Opel		2
(Germany) Christian Zeller	61	(Germany) Christian Zeller	F300/050	Opel		2
(France) Remy Striebig	62	(France) Remy Striebig	F399/009	Opel		2, 5
(Germany) Peter Hug	63	(Germany) Peter Hug	F399/011	Opel		2
(Germany) Leipert Motorsport	64	(Switzerland) Tobias Blättler	F301/026	Opel		5–7

Icon	Status
R	Rookie

== Calendar ==
With the exception of round at TT Circuit Assen, all rounds took place on German soil.

Round		Location	Circuit	Date	Supporting
1	R1	Oschersleben, Germany	Motorsport Arena Oschersleben	23 April	ADAC Westfalen-Pokal-Rennen
1	R2	Oschersleben, Germany	Motorsport Arena Oschersleben	24 April	ADAC Westfalen-Pokal-Rennen
2	R1	Hockenheim, Germany	Hockenheimring	21 May	ADAC Rennsportfestival Würzburg
2	R2	Hockenheim, Germany	Hockenheimring	22 May	ADAC Rennsportfestival Würzburg
3	R1	Saxony, Germany	Sachsenring	18 June	ADAC Rundstreckenrennen Sachsenring
3	R2	Saxony, Germany	Sachsenring	19 June	ADAC Rundstreckenrennen Sachsenring
4	R1	Klettwitz, Germany	EuroSpeedway Lausitz	9 July	ADAC F1 Historic
4	R2	Klettwitz, Germany	EuroSpeedway Lausitz	10 July	ADAC F1 Historic
5	R1	Nürburg, Germany	Nürburgring	9 July	ADAC Truck Grand Prix
5	R2	Nürburg, Germany	Nürburgring	10 July	ADAC Truck Grand Prix
6	R1	Nürburg, Germany	Nürburgring	30 July	ACV-Sprint-Meeting
6	R2	Nürburg, Germany	Nürburgring	31 July	ACV-Sprint-Meeting
7	R1	Assen, Netherlands	TT Circuit Assen	6 August	Rizla Race Day
7	R2	Assen, Netherlands	TT Circuit Assen	7 August	Rizla Race Day
8	R1	Klettwitz, Germany	EuroSpeedway Lausitz	27 August	ADAC Eastside 100
8	R2	Klettwitz, Germany	EuroSpeedway Lausitz	28 August	ADAC Eastside 100
9	R1	Oschersleben, Germany	Motorsport Arena Oschersleben	8 October	ADAC-Börde-Preis
9	R2	Oschersleben, Germany	Motorsport Arena Oschersleben	9 October	ADAC-Börde-Preis

== Results ==
Round		Circuit	Pole position	Fastest lap	Winning driver	Winning team	Trophy Winner	Rookie Winner
1	R1	Motorsport Arena Oschersleben	(Germany) Peter Elkmann	(Germany) Peter Elkmann	(China) Ho-Pin Tung	(Belgium) JB Motorsport	(Germany) Kevin Fank	(Germany) Frank Kechele
1	R2	Motorsport Arena Oschersleben	(Germany) Frank Kechele	(Germany) Frank Kechele	(Germany) Frank Kechele	(Germany) FS Motorsport	(Germany) Kevin Fank	(Germany) Frank Kechele
2	R1	Hockenheimring	(Republic of Ireland) Michael Devaney	(Germany) Jochen Nerpel	(Republic of Ireland) Michael Devaney	(Austria) HS Technik Motorsport	(Switzerland) Urs Rüttimann	(Germany) Pascal Kochem
2	R2	Hockenheimring	(Germany) Peter Elkmann	(Germany) Peter Elkmann	(Germany) Martin Hippe	(Austria) HS Technik Motorsport	(Germany) Kevin Fank	(Germany) Martin Hippe
3	R1	Sachsenring	(Germany) Peter Elkmann	(Germany) Peter Elkmann	(Germany) Peter Elkmann	(Switzerland) Jo Zeller Racing	(Germany) Kevin Fank	(Germany) Pascal Kochem
3	R2	Sachsenring	(Germany) Peter Elkmann	(Germany) Pascal Kochem	(Germany) Peter Elkmann	(Switzerland) Jo Zeller Racing	(Germany) Christer Jöns	(Germany) Pascal Kochem
4	R1	EuroSpeedway Lausitz	(Germany) Martin Hippe	(Republic of Ireland) Michael Devaney	(Republic of Ireland) Michael Devaney	(Austria) HS Technik Motorsport	(Germany) Kevin Fank	(Germany) Martin Hippe
4	R2	EuroSpeedway Lausitz	(Germany) Peter Elkmann	(Germany) Peter Elkmann	(Germany) Peter Elkmann	(Switzerland) Jo Zeller Racing	(Germany) Christer Jöns	(Germany) Pascal Kochem
5	R1	Nürburgring	(Germany) Peter Elkmann	(Germany) Peter Elkmann	(Germany) Peter Elkmann	(Switzerland) Jo Zeller Racing	(Germany) Kevin Fank	(Germany) Frank Kechele
5	R2	Nürburgring	(Germany) Peter Elkmann	(Germany) Peter Elkmann	(Germany) Peter Elkmann	(Switzerland) Jo Zeller Racing	(Germany) Christer Jöns	(Germany) Pascal Kochem
6	R1	Nürburgring	(Germany) Peter Elkmann	(Germany) Peter Elkmann	(Republic of Ireland) Michael Devaney	(Austria) HS Technik Motorsport	(Switzerland) Tobias Blättler	(Germany) Pascal Kochem
6	R2	Nürburgring	(China) Ho-Pin Tung	(Germany) Peter Elkmann	(Republic of Ireland) Michael Devaney	(Austria) HS Technik Motorsport	(Germany) Kevin Fank	(Germany) Martin Hippe
7	R1	TT Circuit Assen	(Netherlands) Ferdinand Kool	(China) Ho-Pin Tung	(Netherlands) Ferdinand Kool	(Belgium) JB Motorsport	(Germany) Christer Jöns	(Netherlands) Ferdinand Kool
7	R2	TT Circuit Assen	(Germany) Pascal Kochem	(Germany) Martin Hippe	(Republic of Ireland) Michael Devaney	(Austria) HS Technik Motorsport	(Switzerland) Tobias Blättler	(Germany) Martin Hippe
8	R1	EuroSpeedway Lausitz	(Netherlands) Ferdinand Kool	(Germany) Julian Theobald	(Germany) Jan Seyffarth	(Germany) Seyffarth Motorsport	not held	(Netherlands) Ferdinand Kool
8	R2	EuroSpeedway Lausitz	(Netherlands) Ferdinand Kool	(Germany) Ronny Wechselberger	(Netherlands) Ferdinand Kool	(Belgium) JB Motorsport	not held	(Netherlands) Ferdinand Kool
9	R1	Motorsport Arena Oschersleben	(Germany) Peter Elkmann	(Germany) Peter Elkmann	(Germany) Peter Elkmann	(Switzerland) Jo Zeller Racing	(Germany) Kevin Fank	(Germany) Martin Hippe
9	R2	Motorsport Arena Oschersleben	(China) Ho-Pin Tung	(Germany) Peter Elkmann	(China) Ho-Pin Tung	(Belgium) JB Motorsport	(Germany) Kevin Fank	(Germany) Frank Kechele

== ATS Formel 3 Cup ==
- Points are awarded as follows:

1	2	3	4	5	6	7	8	PP	FL
10	8	6	5	4	3	2	1	**1**	1

Pos	Driver	OSC1		HOC		SAC		LAU1		NÜR1		NÜR2		ASS		LAU2		OSC2		Pts
1	(Germany) Peter Elkmann	**2**	5	5	**2**	**1**	1	3	**1**	**1**	**1**	**2**	4	2	3	3	**10**	**1**	2	150
2	(Republic of Ireland) Michael Devaney			**1**	Ret	2	6	1	2	3	4	1	1	8	1	14	4	3	3	101
3	(China) Ho-Pin Tung	1	3	4	4	16	Ret	DNS	Ret	4	3	4	**2**	6	5	Ret	2	2	**1**	88
4	(Germany) Pascal Kochem	DNS	10	3	6	3	**2**	4	3	5	2	3	Ret	3	**DNS**	4	3	5	5	79
5	(Germany) Frank Kechele	3	**1**	8	8	4	3	Ret	4	2	6	17	5	5	4	7	9	6	4	71
6	(Germany) Martin Hippe	9	8	7	1	8	Ret	**2**	6	12	7	5	3	10	2	6	5	4	6	64
7	(Netherlands) Ferdinand Kool	7	4	Ret	3	7	4	10	7	6	Ret	6	6	**1**	Ret	**2**	1	Ret	7	63
8	(Germany) Franz Schmöller	6	7	26	Ret	6	5	6	8	7	Ret	8	9	12	6	8	7	8	8	28
9	(Germany) Robert Kath	4	2	2	7	15	7													25
10	(Germany) Jochen Nerpel			6	5	5	Ret	7	5	Ret	5									22
11	(Germany) Julian Theobald	11	14	15	10	11	8	13	12	14	Ret	10	17	11	10	5	6	7	12	11
12	(Germany) Jan Seyffarth															1	Ret			10
13	(Germany) Dominik Schraml	13	16	9	Ret	Ret	Ret	11	9	8	8	7	7	17	9			Ret	11	7
14	(Germany) Ronny Wechselberger							5	10							10	8			6
15	(Netherlands) Paul Meijer	5	9																	5
16	(Germany) Christer Jöns	Ret	18	14	11	17	10	12	13	13	9	12	14	7	12			13	14	3
17	(Germany) Johannes Theobald	12	11	10	15	10	9			10	Ret	Ret	10	9	8			9	10	3
18	(Pakistan) Adam Langley-Khan							8	11											1
19	(Germany) Kevin Fank	15	13	12	9	9	Ret	9	15	11	15	13	8	16	13			10	13	1
20	(Latvia) Harald Schlegelmilch															9	13	Ret	9	0
21	(Germany) Sven Barth									9	Ret									0
22	(Switzerland) Tobias Blättler									Ret	10	9	11	15	11					0
23	(Belgium) Maxime Hodencq	10	Ret																	0
24	(Germany) Christopher Kuntz	18	20	19	13	13	11	16	DNS	18	11	11	13	18	16			12	16	0
25	(Germany) Norman Knop	19	19	25	21	14	13	DNS	Ret	16	13	14	14	14	Ret	11	11	11	20	0
26	(Switzerland) Urs Rüttimann			11	14					15	12									0
27	(Germany) Florian Schnitzenbaumer	17	17	17	Ret	12	12	15	16	19	16	Ret	15							0
28	(Austria) Manuel Taxacher			13	12															0
29	(Austria) Franz Wöss															13	12			0
30	(Austria) Christopher Wassermann	14	12																	0
31	(Germany) Marcel Leipert															12	15			0
32	(China) Lou Meng Cheong											Ret	DNS	13	14					0
33	(Italy) Luca Iannaccone	20	21	23	20	18	14	18	17	21	18	15	Ret	19	15	15	14	16	19	0
34	(Germany) Frank Brendecke	16	15					14	14											0
35	(Italy) Diego Romanini																	14	15	0
36	(Germany) Thomas Rössler									17	14									0
37	(Switzerland) Radi Müller			21	17			17	Ret	20	Ret	16	16					15	18	0
38	(Germany) Christian Zeller			18	16															0
39	(France) Patrick d'Aubreby			16	DNS															0
40	(France) Remy Striebig			24	19					22	17									0
41	(Czech Republic) Petr Samek																	Ret	17	0
42	(Switzerland) Daniel Roider			20	18															0
43	(Germany) Peter Hug			22	Ret															0
guest drivers ineligible for points
	(Italy) Davide Valsecchi													4	7					
	(Monaco) Michael Herck	8	6							23	**DNS**									
Pos	Driver	OSC1		HOC		SAC		LAU1		NÜR1		NÜR2		ASS		LAU2		OSC2		Pts

Colour	Result
Gold	Winner
Silver	Second place
Bronze	Third place
Green	Points classification
Blue	Non-points classification
Blue	Non-classified finish (NC)
Purple	Retired, not classified (Ret)
Red	Did not qualify (DNQ)
Red	Did not pre-qualify (DNPQ)
Black	Disqualified (DSQ)
White	Did not start (DNS)
White	Withdrew (WD)
White	Race cancelled (C)
Blank	Did not practice (DNP)
Blank	Did not arrive (DNA)
Blank	Excluded (EX)

**Bold** - Pole
Italics - Fastest Lap
