= Gina-Maria Adenauer =

German racing driver

- Nationality: (Germany) German
- Born: 16 August 1985 (age 41) Hamm, North Rhine-Westphalia, Germany

Previous series
- 2006 2005 2004 2003 2001: Formula 3 Euroseries; Seat León Supercopa; Toyota Yaris Cup Germany; Formula 3 Germany; Formula Volkswagen Germany; SpeedWomen Cup; Formula König

Gina Maria Adenauer (born 16 August 1985 in Hamm, North Rhine-Westphalia) is a German race car driver.

== Career ==
Adenauer started her career in karting, then moved to German Formula König at the age of 17 in 2002, moving on to German Formula VW the following year and on to German Formula Three in 2004, where she drove for the Seyffarth team. In 2005, she was racing in the Toyota Yaris Cup for "Busch-Racing". In 2006, she took part in the F3 Euroseries race at the Norisring, finishing fifth in the Drivers' Trophy which is restricted to drivers who are not more than 22 years old, using chassis specifications that are two to four years old. She also raced in the SEAT León Supercopa series, finishing 12th in her debut in the Konrad Motorsport entered car.
