= Peter Elkmann =

German racing driver

- Nationality: (Germany) German
- Born: 16 September 1981 (age 45) Steinfurt, Germany

German Formula Three Championship career
- Current team: Performance Racing
- Categorisation: FIA Silver
- Car number: 8

Peter Elkmann (born 16 September 1981 in North Rhine-Westphalia, Steinfurt) is a German racing driver. He has competed in such series as the Formula Three Euroseries and the German Formula Three Championship.

== Performer by Elkmann ==
Elkmann launched his own racing car in 2015, the Performer 1000. The car is a more powerful version of a superkart. The car weighing in at 290 kg is powered by a 1000cc Suzuki GSX-R1000 engine. The car is allowed to race in the Seven Mania Racing Club and Carbonia Cup.

== Racing record ==
=== Complete Formula 3 Euro Series results ===
(key) (Races in bold indicate pole position) (Races in italics indicate fastest lap)

Year	Entrant	Chassis	Engine	1	2	3	4	5	6	7	8	9	10	11	12	13	14	15	16	17	18	19	20	DC	Points
2004	Swiss Racing Team	Dallara F302/061	Opel	HOC; 1	HOC; 2	EST; 1	EST; 2	ADR; 1	ADR; 1	PAU; 1	PAU; 2	NOR; 1; 17	NOR; 1; 15	MAG; 1 Ret	MAG; 2; 19	NÜR; 1 Ret	NÜR; 2; 20	ZAN; 1; 18	ZAN; 2 Ret	BRN; 1; 17	BRN; 2; 20	HOC; 1; 15	HOC; 2; 16	30th	0
2006	Jo Zeller Racing	Dallara F306/014	Opel	HOC; 1; 12	HOC; 2; 21	LAU; 1; 13	LAU; 2; 18	OSC; 1; 21	OSC; 2; 13	BRH; 1; 8	BRH; 2; 1	NOR; 1; 9	NOR; 2; 3	NÜR; 1; 12	NÜR; 2; 4	ZAN; 1; 10	ZAN; 2; 9	CAT; 1	CAT; 2	LMS; 1	LMS; 2	HOC; 1; 9	HOC; 2> 2	14th	14
2008	RC Motorsport	Dallara F308/051	Volkswagen	HOC; 1	HOC; 2	MUG; 1	MUG; 2	PAU; 1	PAU; 2	NOR; 1	NOR; 2	ZAN; 1	ZAN; 2	NÜR; 1	NÜR; 2	BRH; 1	BRH; 2	CAT; 1	CAT; 2	LMS; 1; 13	LMS; 2; 21	HOC; 1	HOC; 2	NC	0

=== Complete 24 Hours of Nürburgring results ===
Year	Team	Co-drivers	Car	Class	Laps	Pos.	Class pos.
2022	(Germany) MSC Emstal e.V. im ADAC	(Italy) Daniel Fink (Italy) Florian Haller (Germany) Sebastian Schemmann	Volkswagen Golf GTI TCR	TCR	132	49th	5th
2025	(Austria) Konrad Motorsport	(Bulgaria) Pavel Lefterov (Germany) Maximilian Paul (United States) Danny Soufi	Lamborghini Huracán GT3 Evo	SP9 Pro-Am	137	8th	3rd

Sporting positions
Preceded by Bastian Kolmsee	German Formula Three Champion; 2005	Succeeded by Ho-Pin Tung
