= Tim Sandtler =

German racing driver

- Nationality: (Germany) German
- Born: 20 February 1987 (age 39) Bochum, West Germany

Formula Three Euroseries career
- Current team: Prema Powerteam
- Categorisation: FIA Silver
- Car number: 35

Tim Sandtler (born February 20, 1987, in Bochum) is a German racing driver. He has competed in such series as International Formula Master, Formula BMW ADAC, Formula Three Euroseries and the German Formula Three Championship.
