= 2012 6 Hours of Spa-Francorchamps =

Sports car endurance race held at Spa-Francorchamps

The Circuit de Spa-Francorchamps

The 2012 WEC 6 Hours of Spa-Francorchamps was a six-hour automobile endurance race for two or three driver teams in Le Mans Prototype (LMP) and Le Mans Grand Touring Endurance (LMGTE) cars held at the Circuit de Spa-Francorchamps in Francorchamps, Stavelot, Wallonia, Belgium on 5 May 2012 before 31,000 people. It was the second round of eight in the 2012 FIA World Endurance Championship, featuring the Le Mans Prototype 1 (LMP1), Le Mans Prototype 2 (LMP2), Le Mans Grand Touring Endurance Professional (LMGTE Pro), and Le Mans Grand Touring Endurance Amateur (LMGTE Am) classes.

Rinaldo Capello, Tom Kristensen and Allan McNish shared the pole position in a hybrid Audi R18 e-tron quattro after McNish was fastest overall in qualifying. Kristensen led the first two laps before being passed on the third by the sister team of Marcel Fässler, André Lotterer and Benoît Tréluyer. The trio led the race until they were passed by a non-hybrid Audi R18 ultra shared by Romain Dumas, Loïc Duval and Marc Gené, which they maintained for the final 96 laps to win outright and move Dumas and Duval to the lead of the World Endurance Drivers' Championship and keep Audi atop the LMP1 Manufacturers' World Championship. Fässler, Lotterer, and Tréluyer finished 46.801 seconds behind in second place, and the second Audi R18 ultra, driven by Marco Bonanomi and Oliver Jarvis, finished one lap behind in third place.

The LMP2 category was won by Jota's Zytek Z11SN-Nissan car of Simon Dolan and Sam Hancock, who took the lead in the final three laps from the ADR-Delta team of Tor Graves, Robbie Kerr and John Martin, who made a late race pit stop for fuel and finished 6.378 seconds behind the Jota entry to take the lead of the Endurance Trophy For LMP2 Teams. Brendon Hartley, Warren Hughes and Jody Firth were third in class in a Murphy Prototypes Oreca 03-Nissan car. Porsche won the LMGTE Pro category with a Porsche 997 GT3-RSR shared by Marc Lieb and Richard Lietz, holding off a late race challenge from an AF Corse-fielded Ferrari 458 Italia GT2 of Gianmaria Bruni and Giancarlo Fisichella by 0.628 seconds to tie AF Corse on points in the Endurance Trophy For LMGTE Pro Teams. IMSA Performance Matmut's Porsche of Nicolas Armindo, Raymond Narac and Anthony Pons led all but four laps in LMGTE Am, while Team Felbermayr-Proton's Christian Ried, Gianluca Roda and Paolo Ruberti finished second to extend their lead in the Endurance Trophy For LMGTE Am Teams.

== Background ==
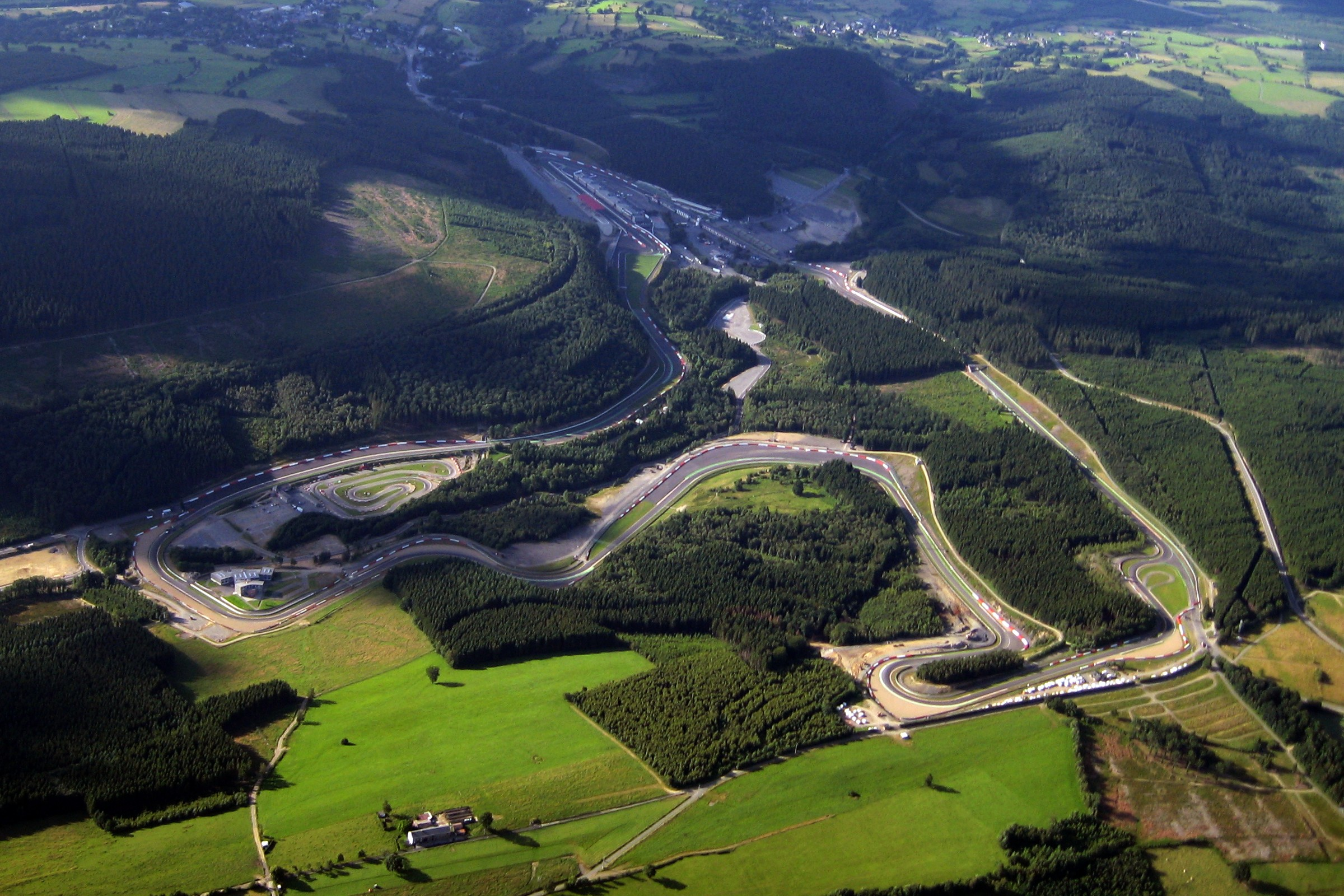
Circuit de Spa-Francorchamps, where the race was held.

The 2012 6 Hours of Spa-Francorchamps was confirmed as part of the FIA World Endurance Championship (WEC) season at the FIA World Motor Sport Council meeting in New Delhi on 7 December 2011. It was the second of eight scheduled rounds of the 2012 FIA World Endurance Championship and the race's debut appearance in the series. The event was held at the 7.004 km (4.352 mi) Circuit de Spa-Francorchamps in Francorchamps, Stavelot, Wallonia, Belgium on 5 May 2012.

Before the race, Audi Sport Team Joest drivers Rinaldo Capello, Tom Kristensen and Allan McNish led the World Endurance Drivers' Championship with 25 points, seven ahead of their teammates Timo Bernhard, Romain Dumas and Loïc Duval. Audi were unopposed in the LMP1 Manufacturers' World Championship with 25 points. With 33 points each, Ferrari and Porsche led the LMGTE Manufacturers' World Cup. Pescarolo Team led Strakka Racing in the Endurance Trophy for LMP1 Teams by seven points. A similar gap separated Starworks Motorsport and OAK Racing in the Endurance Trophy For LMP2 Teams as well as between AF Corse and Team Felbermayr-Proton in the Endurance Trophy For LMGTE Pro Teams. Proton led Larbre Compétition by seven points in the Endurance Trophy For LMGTE Am Teams.

== Entry list ==
The event included 42 cars divided into the Le Mans Prototype 1 (LMP1), Le Mans Prototype 2 (LMP2), Le Mans Grand Touring Endurance Professional (LMGTE Pro), and Le Mans Grand Touring Endurance Amateur (LMGTE Am) classes. There were 27 Le Mans Prototype (LMP) cars and 15 Le Mans Grand Touring Endurance (LMGTE) cars competing. Following the cancellation of the European Le Mans Series (ELMS) event at Circuit Zolder due to a lack of entries, eight ELMS teams received one-off entries to the Spa-Francorchamps race in order to prepare for the 2012 24 Hours of Le Mans. (Note: ELMS teams did not require any technical alterations to their cars since they were the same as the WEC's but were ineligible for ELMS championship points since Spa was a non-ELMS event.) The WEC put all entries in the Formula One pitlane building rather than the former pit lane because Radical cars were there.

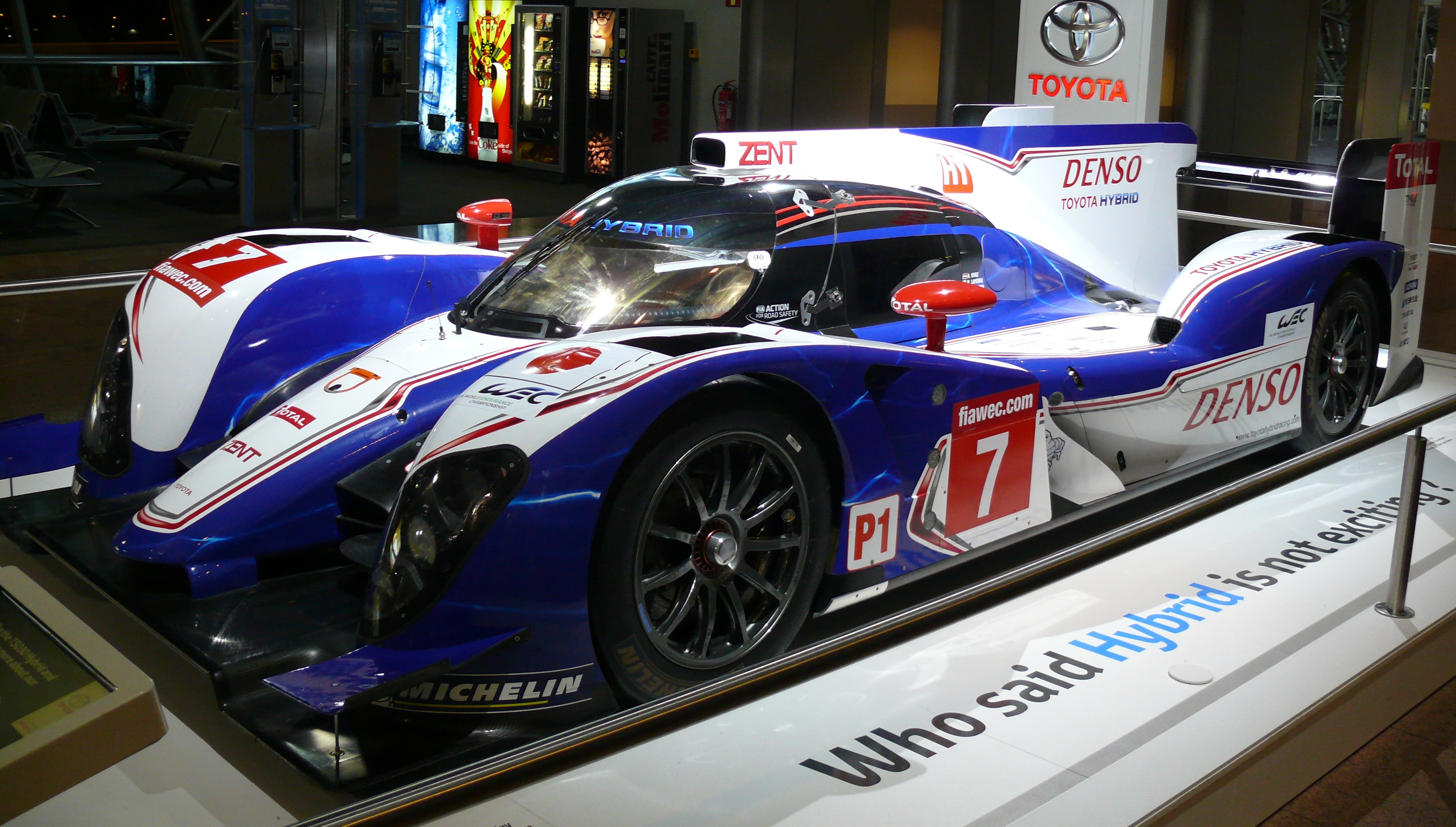
The debut of the Toyota TS030 Hybrid was postponed to the 24 Hours of Le Mans following a major testing accident at the Circuit Paul Ricard.

Audi were the only LMP1 manufacturer. It debuted two diesel-powered R18 Ultras (one by Audi Sport Team Joest and one by Audi Sport North America) and two Joest-entered hybrid R18 e-tron quattros. Rebellion Racing introduced the 2012 bodywork for its two Lola B12/60-Toyotas at Spa, while Strakka Racing and JRM both had HPD ARX-03a-Honda cars. OAK Racing fielded a single OAK Pescarolo 01-Judd car, while the Pescarolo Team debuted the Judd-powered Dome S102.5. Toyota delayed the debut of its TS030 Hybrid car at Spa-Francorchamps following a heavy testing accident involving driver Nicolas Lapierre at Circuit Paul Ricard in France the previous month that required the car to be rebuilt. Henri Pescarolo withdrew intentions to run his team's Pescarolo 03-Judd car at Spa because it was not ready for the race due to a production delay caused by late payment for car components delivered from England.

LMP2 had 18 entries from five manufacturers due to the inclusion of six full-season ELMS teams. Oreca entered seven 03 vehicles in the class, with Signatech Nissan fielding two (expanding from one) and ADR-Delta, Race Performance, Boutsen Ginion Racing, Murphy Prototypes and Pecom Racing fielding one apiece. Lola had five Lola B12/80 vehicles at Spa with two each for Gulf Racing Middle East and Lotus and one for Status GP. OAK Racing expanded to running two Morgan LMP2-Judds for the first time in the season. Zytek was represented by two Zytek Z11SN cars with one each for Jota and Greaves Motorsport. Extrême Limite ARIC entered one Judd-powered Norma M200P and Starworks Motorsport fielded the lone HPD ARX-03b.

Spa's LMGTE field included 14 vehicles from four different car brands. LMGTE Pro featured the same five cars from the season-opening 12 Hours of Sebring. Ferrari had the most cars in the category, with three 458 Italias, two of which were run by AF Corse and one by Luxury Racing. Aston Martin Racing fielded an Aston Martin Vantage GTE, while Porsche had a single Porsche 997 GT3-RSR entered by Team-Felbermayr Proton. LMGTE Am included nine cars because of two ELMS teams competing. There were four 2011 Ferrari 458 Italias in the class, one each from AF Corse, AF Corse-Waltrip, Luxury Racing and Krohn Racing. Porsche were represented by three one-year-old 997 GT3-RSRs, one each by JWA-Avila, Team-Felbermayr Proton and IMSA Performance Matmut. Larbre Compétition were the sole Chevrolet team, fielding two Chevrolet Corvette C6.Rs.

== Balance of performance changes ==
The Porsche 911 GT3-RSR had a 10 kg (22 lb) weight increase, while the Ferrari 458 Italia received a 15 kg (33 lb) ballast addition to improve handling in the LMGTE Pro balance of performance changes. The Aston Martin Vantage GTE and all LMGTE Am vehicles received no performance updates.

== Practice ==
The first two 90-minute practice sessions took place on 3 May and the third one-hour session was held the following day. The first session took place in overcast weather on a damp circuit. Audi took the first four overall positions, with Benoît Tréluyer's No. 1 Audi e-tron quattro setting the fastest lap of 2:04.434 early in the session. Duval's No. 3 Audi R18 ultra was 0.044 seconds slower. Capello's No. 2 Audi e-tron quattro was third with Marco Bonanomi's No. 4 Audi R18 ultra fourth. The fastest petrol-powered LMP1 car was Andrea Belicchi's No. 13 Rebellion Lola-Toyota in fifth. Soheil Ayari's No. 49 Pecom Oreca led LMP2 with a time of 2:10.646. Alexander Sims' Status GP Lola-Judd and Stéphane Sarrazin's Starworks HPD cars were second and third in class. Gianmaria Bruni's No. 51 AF Corse Ferrari led the LMGTE Pro class with a 2:20.916 lap, beating Marc Lieb's No. 77 Team Felbermayr-Proton Porsche by four-tenths of a second. Paolo Ruberti's No. 88 Team Felbermayr-Proton Porsche paced LMGTE Am with a 2:23.135 lap. With 20 minutes remaining, Nick Leventis locked the No. 21 Strakka HPD car's brakes on oil through the La Source hairpin and crashed into the tyre barrier leaving the turn. The car received minor damage and was placed behind the tyre wall.

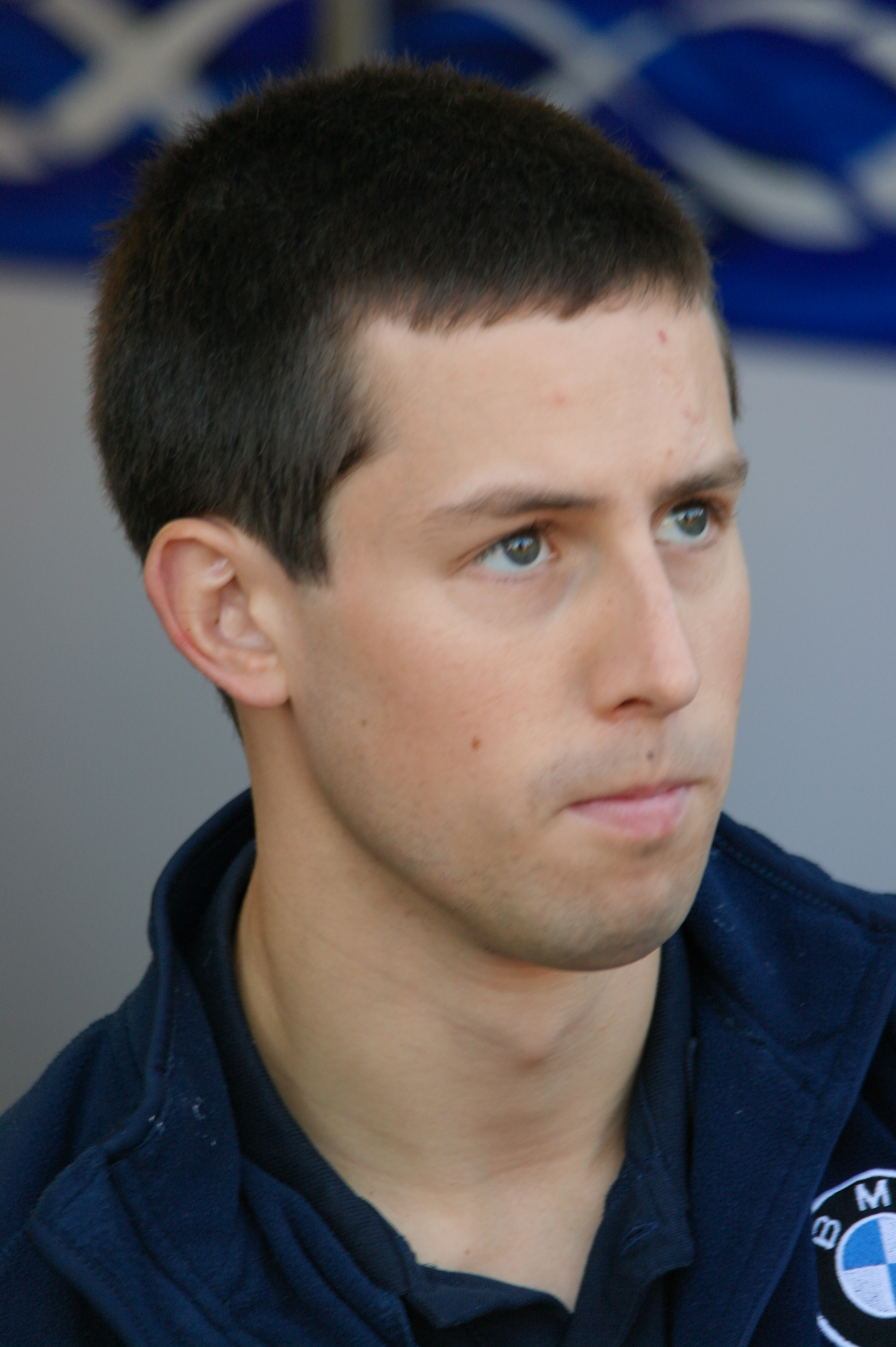
Alexander Sims (pictured in 2014) sustained a heavy accident in the second practice session that necessitated the Status GP car's withdrawal.

The second 90-minute practice session was delayed due to marshals replacing a barrier at Blanchimont corner damaged by a Radical car during the second Radical European Masters practice session and ended early to comply with mid-week noise rules. André Lotterer's No. 1 Audi set the pace on new tyres with a 2:03.075 lap in the final third of practice. He was three-tenths of a second faster than McNish's sister No. 2 car, ahead of Oliver Jarvis' No. 4 entry and Duval. Nick Heidfeld's No. 12 Rebellion car was the highest-placed petrol powered car in fifth. OAK led in LMP2 with a 2:10.058 lap from Olivier Pla's No. 24 Morgan car, four-tenths of a second faster than Thomas Holzer's No. 31 Lotus Lola vehicle. Sims collided into the barriers in Radillion corner, on a hill above Eau Rouge turn, to stop practice with 20 minutes remaining. He was unhurt, but the 6G hit forced the Status Lola to withdraw from the event due to a lack of spare parts. Three different manufacturers had the first three fastest laps in LMGTE Pro. Lieb led the category with a 2:19.668 lap ahead of Darren Turner's No. 97 Aston Martin and Luxury's No. 59 Ferrari. Nicolas Armindo's IMSA Porsche paced LMGTE Am at 2:21.872 from Jean-Philippe Belloc's No. 30 Luxury Ferrari and AF Corse-Waltrip's Ferrari.

During a simulated driver change, Gulf Racing Middle East owner Frédéric Fatien got his foot snagged on a wheel behind him, fell, and broken his lower leg in three places. He was hospitalised and withdrew from the race, leaving Jean-Denis Delétraz and Keiko Ihara to drive the No. 29 Lola car. The final session was held in sunny weather with intermittent rain. Marcel Fässler's No. 1 Audi posted the quickest lap, 2:01.998, right before the session finished. He was three-tenths of a second quicker than Bonanomi with Marc Gené's No. 3 Audi and McNish in second through fourth. Ayari lapped fastest in LMP2 at 2:09.170, with Pla second and James Rossiter's No. 32 Lotus Lola third. Stefan Mücke's No. 97 Aston Martin led LMGTE Pro with a lap of 2:19.785, almost one second quicker than Frédéric Makowiecki's No. 59 Luxury Ferrari, and Giancarlo Fisichella's No. 51 AF Corse came third. Belloc's lap of 2:22.073 paced LMGTE Am. Anthony Pons' IMSA Porsche and the No. 58 Luxury Ferrari were second and third in class. When Rob Kauffman locked up at Les Combes corner and lost control of his AF Corse-Waltrip Ferrari, he hit the rear of Pons (who had passed him on the Kemmel straight) and rear-ended the barrier. Starworks ended practice early because driver Enzo Potolicchio lost control of the HPD LMP2 car and failed to restart.

== Qualifying ==
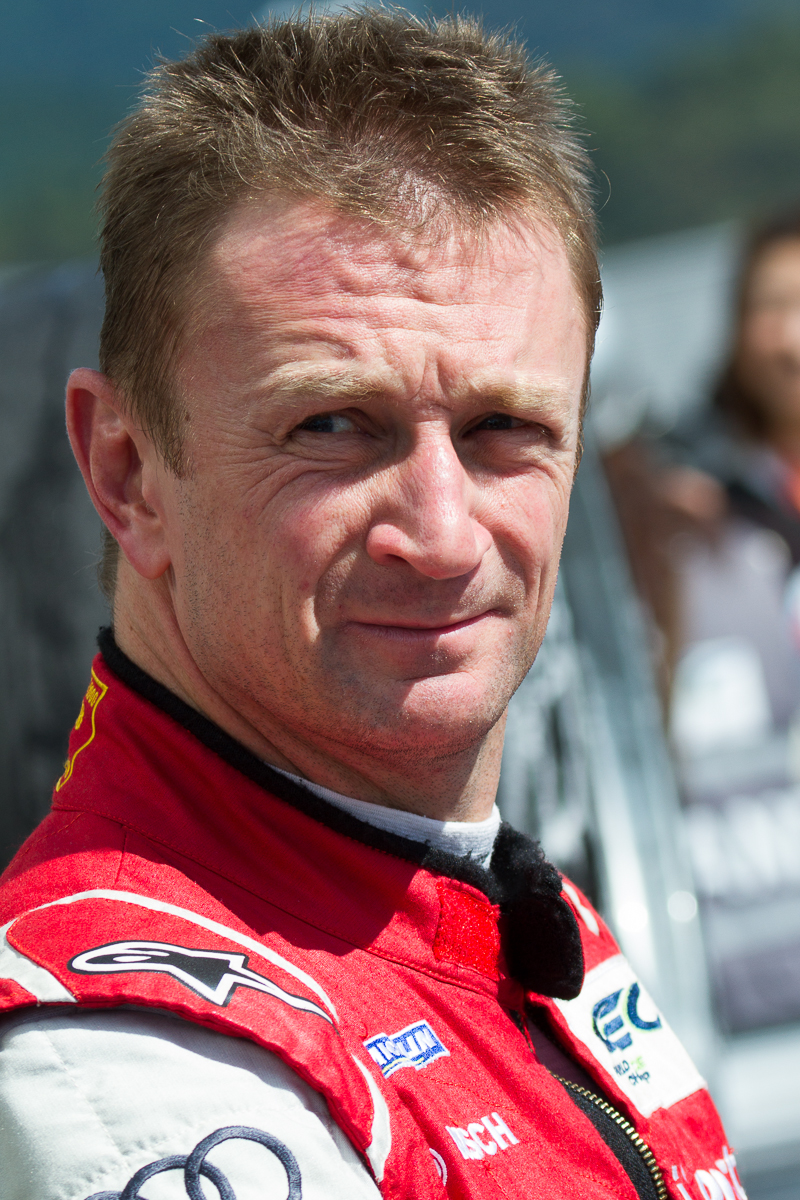
Allan McNish set the fastest overall qualifying lap time to put the No. 2 Audi R18 e-tron quattro on pole position.

Friday afternoon's qualifying session was split into two 20-minute groups. The first session was for all LMGTE cars, while the second was for all LMP entries. The team with the quickest lap time in each of the four categories won one championship point for themselves and their drivers. A threat of rain had passed, and there was a gentle breeze, with the temperature rising. McNish qualified the No. 2 Audi fastest overall with a 2:01.967 lap, which he then improved to 2:01.579 to clinch pole position on the R18 e-tron quattro's debut. It was McNish's first pole position at Spa-Francorchamps. Bonanomi's No. 4 Audi, the fastest non-hybrid Audi ultra car, joined McNish on the front row, and he held pole until McNish's first quick lap. Bonanomi was faster in the first sector but encountered traffic and failed to lap faster. Fässler was too slow on his warm-up lap, attempting to avoid traffic, and qualified the No. 1 Audi third. Duval's two quick laps were hampered by traffic, putting the No. 3 Audi fourth. The fastest petrol-powered car was Neel Jani's No. 12 Rebellion Lola-Toyota in fifth place, followed by Danny Watts' Strakka HPD in sixth.

John Martin drove the ADR-Delta Oreca Judd car to pole position for the first time in LMP2 with a lap of 2:09.302 after his team removed aerodynamics to allow him to go faster on the straights. Rossiter qualified the No. 32 Lotus Lola car second in class after slowing on his penultimate fast timed lap and being 0.041 seconds behind Martin. Sam Hancock qualified the Jota Zytek car third, with Pla's OAK Morgan LMP2 car fourth, ensuring that four manufacturers filled the first four starting positions in class. Renger van der Zande's No. 31 Lotus Lola-Judd took fifth. Ferrari dominated the LMGTE Pro category, with two of their three entries leading the class in a tightly contested duel involving all five cars. Makowiecki's No. 59 Luxury car recorded the class' fastest lap of 2:19.770, with Fisichella's No. 51 AF Corse car trailing 0.373 seconds behind. Mücke's No. 97 Aston Martin completed the class' top three. Two ELMS entries took the first two places in LMGTE Am. Armindo secured the class pole position with his first quick lap of 2:21.660 in the IMSA Porsche with three minutes remaining. He demoted Marco Cioci's No. 81 AF Corse Ferrari to second place, while Gunnar Jeannette's No. 58 Luxury Ferrari took third.

=== Qualifying result ===
Pole position winners in each class are marked in bold.

Final qualifying classification
Pos	Class	Team	Driver	Lap Time	Grid
1	**LMP1**	**#2 Audi Sport Team Joest**	**Allan McNish**	**2:01.579**	**1**
2	LMP1	#4 Audi Sport Team North America	Marco Bonanomi	2:02.093	2
3	LMP1	#1 Audi Sport Team Joest	Marcel Fässler	2:02.232	3
4	LMP1	#3 Audi Sport Team Joest	Loïc Duval	2:02.705	4
5	LMP1	#12 Rebellion Racing	Neel Jani	2:04.234	5
6	LMP1	#21 Strakka Racing	Danny Watts	2:04.636	6
7	LMP1	#13 Rebellion Racing	Andrea Belicchi	2:05.078	7
8	LMP1	#22 JRM	Karun Chandhok	2:06.946	8
9	LMP1	#17 Pescarolo Team	Sébastien Bourdais	2:06.954	9
10	LMP1	#15 OAK Racing	Guillaume Moreau	2:07.504	10
11	**LMP2**	**#25 ADR-Delta**	**John Martin**	**2:09.302**	**11**
12	LMP2	#32 Lotus	James Rossiter	2:09.343	12
13	LMP2	#38 Jota	Sam Hancock	2:09.634	13
14	LMP2	#24 OAK Racing	Olivier Pla	2:09.656	14
15	LMP2	#31 Lotus	Renger van der Zande	2:09.833	15
16	LMP2	#49 Pecom Racing	Soheil Ayari	2:09.965	16
17	LMP2	#41 Greaves Motorsport	Elton Julian	2:10.656	17
18	LMP2	#35 OAK Racing	Bas Leinders	2:10.875	18
19	LMP2	#45 Boutsen Ginion Racing	Jack Clarke	2:11.052	19
20	LMP2	#44 Starworks Motorsport	Enzo Potolicchio	2:11.185	20
21	LMP2	#48 Murphy Prototypes	Warren Hughes	2:11.266	21
22	LMP2	#26 Signatech Nissan	Pierre Ragues	2:11.520	22
23	LMP2	#40 Race Performance	Ralph Meichtry	2:11.667	23
24	LMP2	#23 Signatech Nissan	Olivier Lombard	2:12.078	24
25	LMP2	#28 Gulf Racing Middle East	Stefan Johansson	2:14.297	25
26	LMP2	#29 Gulf Racing Middle East	Jean-Denis Délétraz	2:15.537	26
27	LMP2	#43 Extrime Limite ARIC	Philippe Haezebrouck	2:17.810	27
28	**GTE Pro**	**#59 Luxury Racing**	**Frédéric Makowiecki**	**2:19.770**	**28**
29	GTE Pro	#51 AF Corse	Giancarlo Fisichella	2:20.143	29
30	GTE Pro	#97 Aston Martin Racing	Stefan Mücke	2:20.227	30
31	GTE Pro	#77 Team Felbermayr-Proton	Marc Lieb	2:20.251	31
32	GTE Pro	#71 AF Corse	Andrea Bertolini	2:20.885	32
33	**GTE Am**	**#67 IMSA Performance Matmut**	**Nicolas Armindo**	**2:21.640**	**33**
34	GTE Am	#81 AF Corse	Marco Cioci	2:21.975	34
35	GTE Am	#58 Luxury Racing	Gunnar Jeannette	2:22.062	35
36	GTE Am	#50 Larbre Compétition	Julien Canal	2:22.534	36
37	GTE Am	#70 Larbre Compétition	Jean-Philippe Belloc	2:22.542	37
38	GTE Am	#61 AF Corse-Waltrip	Rui Águas	2:23.116	38
39	GTE Am	#55 JWA-Avila	Markus Palttala	2:24.035	39
40	GTE Am	#88 Team Felbermayr-Proton	Christian Ried	2:25.358	40
41	GTE Am	#57 Krohn Racing	Tracy Krohn	2:26.763	41
42	LMP2	#30 Status GP	Did Not Participate (Note: The No. 30 Status GP entry was withdrawn from the race following the second practice session. The car was damaged in a crash and not able to be repaired for the race due to a lack of spare parts.)		—

== Warm-up ==
Overnight torrential rain eased to a drizzle by morning, by which time standing water was on the track and the second Radical European Masters support race removed much of it in time for the 20-minute morning warm-up session on 5 May but visibility-hindering spray remained an issue. Teams thus had to change the setup of the cars quickly. Rain returned to the circuit midway through warm-up, catching some drivers off guard and causing damage to their vehicles. Tréluyer's No. 1 Audi lapped in 2:22.121, followed by teammates Capello, Bonanomi and Duval. Warren Hughes' Murphy Oreca-Nissan led LMP2 with a time of 2:30.417, while Lieb's No. 77 Team Felbermayr-Proton Porsche paced LMGTE Pro and Larbre's No. 50 Corvette led LMGTE Am. Brian Vickers lost control of the AF Corse-Waltrip Ferrari while braking on the wet track, damaging the car's rear-right corner on the barrier backwards at the Bus Stop chicane. Vickers was unhurt but the car was withdrawn from the race because the chassis was bent and repairs could not completed before the start.

== Race ==
=== Start and early hours ===
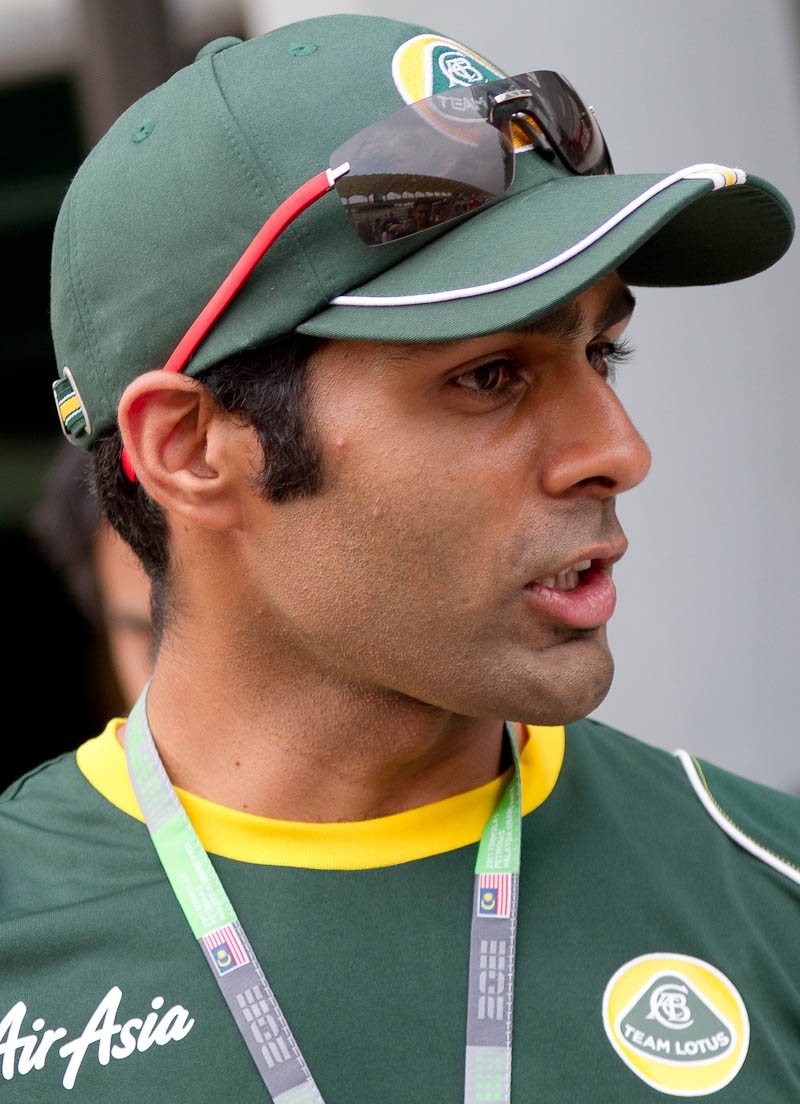
Karun Chandhok (pictured in 2011) crashed the JRM HPD ARX-03a car during a reconnaissance lap and it required new front bodywork.

Conditions improved but the track remained wet and the air was cool under gloomy weather following the morning rain shower, which tapered off 30 minutes before the race start. The air temperature ranged from 8.1 to 8.8 °C (46.6 to 47.8 °F) and the track temperature was between 10 and 12.25 °C (50.00 and 54.05 °F). An anticipated race-long downpour did not materialise. 40 cars were due to take the start, but Karun Chandhok was unable to main tyre temperature in the JRM HPD car and hit the tyre barrier atop Eau Rouge corner on a reconnaissance lap going to the starting grid on the wet track. He returned the car to the pit lane, where it began after replacing the car's front bodywork, which had been pierced by a dive plane and parts of the right-rear suspension. Lotus' No. 31 LMP2 entry changed engines and began a lap down in the pit lane. Makowiecki spun the LMGTE Pro pole-sitting No. 59 Luxury Ferrari leaving La Source hairpin on the formation lap but was able to rejoin the field.

The race began before 31,000 spectators at 14:30 local time, with all cars on wet-compound tyres in heavy spray. With the circuit damp from the earlier rain showers, the hybrid Audis had better grip than the diesel Audis, making them faster through their four-wheel drive hybrid system driving the front wheels at 120 km/h (75 mph) five times during a single lap as per WEC regulations. Kristensen maintained the race lead in the No. 2 Audi before teammate Lotterer in the No. 1 Audi overtook him on the third lap. Cioci's No. 81 AF Corse Ferrari gained the LMGTE Am lead from Armindo's IMSA Porsche on the first lap but lost it to the latter on the second. Ayari moved the Pecom Oreca car to second in LMP2 before Bas Leinders' No. 35 OAK Oreca overtook him when Ayari went wide. Leinders' tyres provided him with decent grip and could attack while retaining tyre temperature, while Hancock's Jota car fell to fifth. Following an unsuccessful steering wheel change, Turner on the softest wet tyres took the LMGTE Pro-leading No. 97 Aston Martin into the garage with a gear selection issue, forcing the car to retire because WEC regulations prohibited mid-race gearbox changes. As the circuit began to dry quickly and the spray began to reduce, Makowiecki, on intermediate tyres, moved the No. 59 Luxury Ferrari past Lieb's No. 77 Felbermayr-Proton Porsche for the LMGTE Pro lead. During the pit stops for fuel and tyres, mechanics replaced Kristensen's bonnet to repair a malfunctioning left-front headlight caused by a wiring problem. This lost Kristensen almost a minute and demoted the No. 2 Audi to third place.

Following pit stops, Ayari took up the LMP2 lead when Gené in the non-hybrid No. 3 Audi began to gain on Lotterer and later Tréluyer in the race-leading No. 1 car by switching to slick tyres while his teammates stayed on intermediate tyres. This was because the hybrid Audis had more oversteer because their front tyre degradation was significantly higher on a dry track due to the different weight distribution to the non-hybrid Audis. The Murphy Oreca received a stop-and-go penalty for breaking the rule that LMP2 and LMGTE Am teams must start the race with the driver who qualified the car, despite getting written permission to start Jody Firth. Martin's ADR-Delta car spun around after colliding with Chandhok's HPD entry near the pit lane entry, but remained third in LMP2 after regaining control of the vehicle. When Ayari collided with IMSA's GTE Porsche and spun, he lost the class lead to Martin. He drove the Pecom Oreca into the pit lane for six minutes to replace the detached front bodywork. Fisichella's No. 51 AF Corse Ferrari led LMGTE Pro for four laps after Lieb's No. 77 Felbermayr-Proton Porsche made a routine pit stop before its own stop as Lieb began catching Fisichella quickly.

=== Late afternoon to finish ===
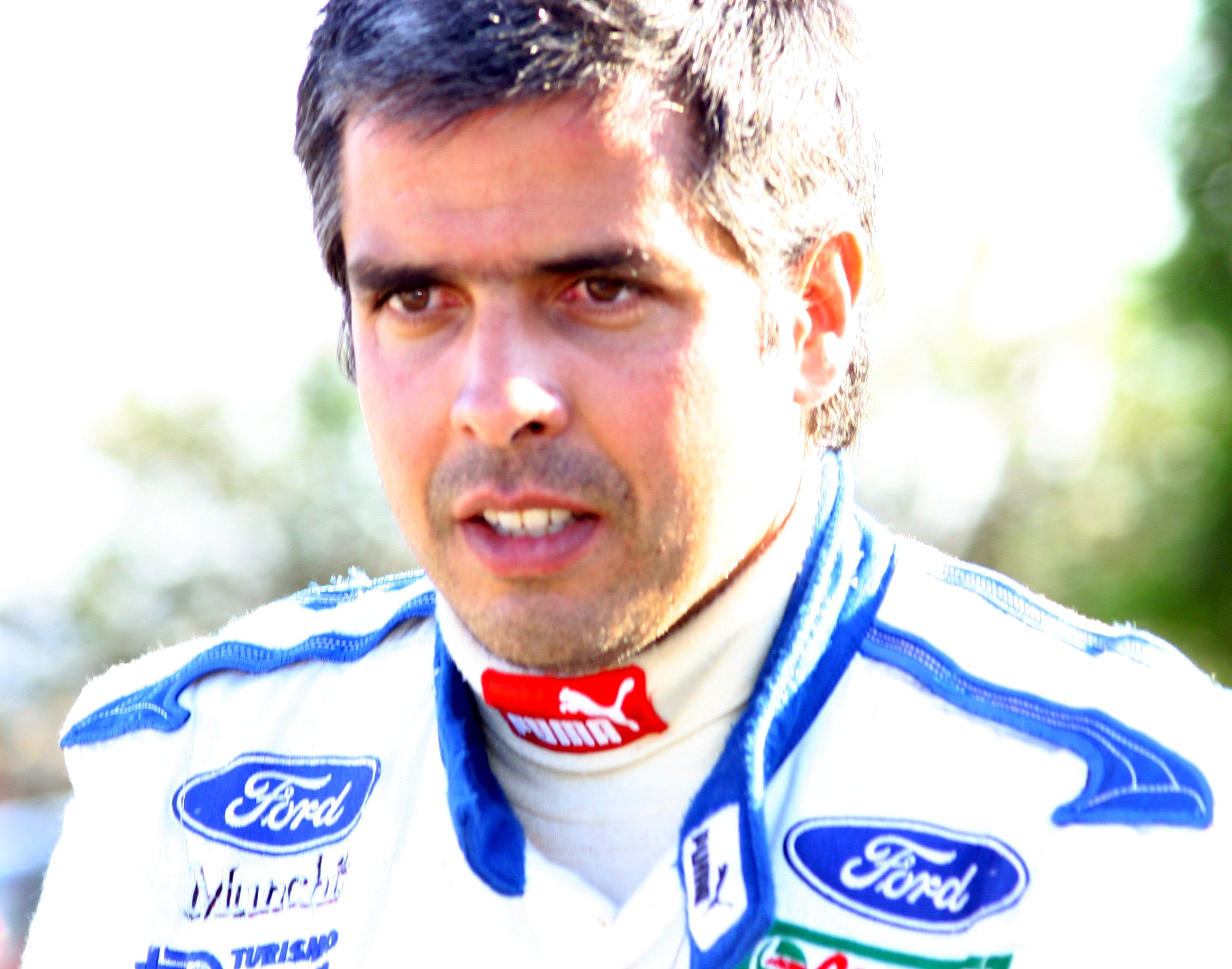
Luis Pérez Companc (pictured in 2006) was involved in an accident with Tracy Krohn that prompted the first deployment of the safety cars in the fourth hour.

Duval took over the No. 3 Audi from Gené and drew in on Tréluyer's No. 1 car, passing him for the lead at La Source hairpin. Simon Dolan used the Jota Zytek car's fuel efficiency to pass the Orecas and take the LMP2 lead. Kevin Weeda lost control of the No. 32 Lotus after exiting the pit lane on cold tyres and crashed outside the La Source hairpin exit barriers. McNish ran wide into the gravel trap at Stavelot corner due to a tyre he disliked, but he rejoined the track without causing significant damage to the No. 2 Audi. At the La Source hairpin in the race's fourth hour, Luis Pérez Companc's No. 49 Pecom Oreca rear-ended Tracy Krohn's Krohn Ferrari. The race was slowed by two safety cars for nine minutes, and no on-track overtaking was permitted. The safety cars had closed the field, and some cars made pit stops, while others were held at the exit of the pit lane waiting to be released. The No. 31 Lotus struck the turn nine tyre barrier after the safety cars were withdrawn. Philippe Haezebrouck lost control of the Extreme Limite Aric Norma car at high speed after leaving the pit lane on cold tyres and following two laps at race speed. He struck the tyre barrier atop the hill at Raidillon corner with the car's rear. Haezebrouck was unhurt and was taken to the medical centre as the safety cars were deployed for the second time to repair the wall and remove the wrecked car.

After the safety cars were recalled, Hancock's LMP2-leading Jota Zytek was given a 30-second stop-and-go penalty for speeding in the pit lane and lost the category lead to Tor Graves' ADR-Delta Oreca entry. In the duel for third overall, Bonanomi's No. 4 Audi was a second behind McNish's sister No. 2 car, as Hughes endured two slow laps trying to conserve fuel, which prevented him from generating tyre temperature in the Murphy Oreca. The top four LMP2 cars were separated by 55 seconds, with Hancock gaining on class leader Graves and Hughes closing in on third-placed Leinders. Both safety car periods separated the race-leading No. 3 Audi from the No. 1 car, allowing Dumas to extend his lead over Fässler. Late in the fourth hour, Bonamoni passed Capello for third place as the No. 2 Audi appeared to suffer more with understeer than the sister No. 1 car due to a setup adjustment that resulted in tyres that wore out faster. Jordan Tresson activated the reserve fuel pump while deactivating the Signatech Nissan traction control system at Stavelot corner, damaging the car's left-front corner at the Bus Stop chicane. After becoming briefly partially stopped in the small pit lane entry due to a lack of steering lock, he was pulled into the pit lane by marshals for 48 minutes of substantial repairs in the pit lane. Robbie Kerr was faster than Hughes' Murphy Oreca and drove the ADR-Delta car into second in LMP2 as Hancock reclaimed the class lead.

Fisichella led ten laps in LMGTE Pro before being replaced by Richard Lietz at the No. 77 Felbermayr-Proton car's final pit stop, before Lietz passed the No. 51 AF Corse Ferrari to retake the class lead. Van Der Zande retired after crashing the No. 31 Lotus Lola into the barriers in the final hour. Dolan had relieved Hancock and began gaining on Kerr's LMP2 leading ADR-Delta car by three or four seconds per lap since Kerr was on worn tyres that had not been replaced during his most recent pit stop. Kerr was able to stabilise the gap to Dolan while Brendon Hartley in the Murphy Oreca was faster and gaining on Dolan. Fässler drove wide in Les Combes corner, struck a kerb, and a puncture necessitated an unscheuled pit stop for a new set of tyres as a precaution, although the No. 1 Audi remained second overall. Capello's sister No. 2 Audi earned a stop-and-go penalty for restarting the engine before his team finished working on it, demoting him to fourth. Kerr's ADR-Delta car led LMP2 until a final pit stop for fuel with five minutes to go, giving the class lead to Dolan's Jota Zytek entry (which lacked radio communication for his final stint) who held it to the finish.

Dumas's, Duval's and Gené's non-hybrid No. 3 Audi ultra held the race lead for the final 98 laps, winning by 46.801 seconds over Audi's highest-placed hybrid, the No. 1 car. Audi's No. 4 ultra finished third, a lap behind in Bonanomi and Jarvis' first podium with Audi, and the No. 2 e-tron quattro finished fourth. Jota won their first international LMP2 race, with Dolan claiming his first global victory and Hancock his first since the 2004 Le Mans Endurance Series. Kerr's ADR-Delta vehicle finished second, 6.378 seconds behind Jota, earning the team and its drivers the most WEC points since Jota was an ELMS guest entrant. Murphy Prototypes completed the class podium through Hughes and Hartley's consistent pace, becoming the first Irish team to do so since Tony Brennan at the 1976 6 Hours of Silverstone. Porsche took their maiden WEC victory, with Lieb's No. 77 Felbermayr-Proton car held off Bruni's No. 51 AF Corse Ferrari (whose improved fuel mileage allowed it to make one less pit stop in their four-stop plan) in the final hour to win LMGTE Pro by 0.628 seconds. The German manufacturer also won in LMGTE Am, with the IMSA Performance Matmut team leading all but four laps and finishing 58.781 seconds clear of Felbermayr-Proton's No. 88 car.

=== Post-race ===
Audi did not expect the ultra cars to be faster than the e-tron quattros in dry weather, according to Duval, and he was surprised by them. Gené stated that winning on his Audi debut was "very unexpected" because he was not expected to be at Spa-Francorchamps and his car was slower in qualifying. Dumas added that low fuel consumption allowed him to build their advantage, and the good tyre wear meant he did not change his car's tyres at the last pit stop. Despite his disappointment at not winning the race, Lotterer praised the start of the e-tron quattro project. Tréluyer said excess oversteer, driver errors, a lack of front tyre heating causing a lack of frontal grip prevented him from attacking Duval. Fässler claimed that he finished second to gain vital championship points. Bonanomi termed it a "great race" and Jarvis said his team's main goal was to avoid mistakes and cover as much distance as possible.

Joest Racing technical director Ralf Jüttner said the difference between the hybrid and non-hybrid Audis surprised both Audi and Joest Racing. Dolan commented on his LMP2 victory: To win a World Championship race is a dream come true, Spa has always been a good track for us, really. It's even better now." Hancock said a negative setup adjustment he made to the Jota Zytek after free practice made the car quite difficult to control in wet weather but it improved once the circuit dried and Jota switched to slick tyres. Kerr noted that he made a late race fuel stop was because "There's a championship at stake here." Lieb remarked that his team would not have had a chance to win in LMGTE Pro if the event had been held in fully dry conditions, but commended the Porsche's performance on a drying course. Lietz said that he was uncomfortable during his final one-and-a-half stints since his crew had to double stint the tyres and refuel in order to stay ahead of AF Corse. Armindo revealed that the objective of his crew was to complete the race and that if he raced too fast for an extended length of time on the wet track, tyre grip would decrease.

The final result put Dumas and Duval two points ahead of Capello, Kristensen, and McNish in the World Endurance Drivers' Championship. Audi remained unopposed in the LMP1 Manufacturers' World Championship while Porsche led Ferrari by one point in the LMGTE Manufacturers' World Cup. Both Rebellion and ADR-Delta took the lead of the Endurance Trophy for LMP1 and LMP2 Teams, respectively. With six races remaining in the season, Team Felbermayr-Proton was tied for the Endurance Trophy for LMGTE Pro Teams lead with AF Corse, but the squad maintained their lead in the Endurance Trophy for LMGTE Am Teams.

=== Race result ===
Class winners in bold. Cars failing to complete 70% of winner's distance (112 laps) marked as Not Classified (NC).

Final race classification
Pos	Class	No.	Team	Drivers	Chassis	Tyre	Laps	Time/Retired
Pos	Class	No.	Team	Drivers	Engine	Tyre	Laps	Time/Retired
1	**LMP1**	**3**	**(Germany) Audi Sport Team Joest**	**(France) Romain Dumas (France) Loïc Duval (Spain) Marc Gené**	**Audi R18 ultra**	M	**160**	**6:00'22.708**
1	**LMP1**	**3**	**(Germany) Audi Sport Team Joest**	**(France) Romain Dumas (France) Loïc Duval (Spain) Marc Gené**	**Audi TDI 3.7 L Turbo V6 (Diesel)**	M	**160**	**6:00'22.708**
2	LMP1	1	(Germany) Audi Sport Team Joest	(Germany) André Lotterer (Switzerland) Marcel Fässler (France) Benoît Tréluyer	Audi R18 e-tron quattro	M	160	+46.801
2	LMP1	1	(Germany) Audi Sport Team Joest	(Germany) André Lotterer (Switzerland) Marcel Fässler (France) Benoît Tréluyer	Audi TDI 3.7 L Turbo V6 (Hybrid Diesel)	M	160	+46.801
3	LMP1	4	(Germany) Audi Sport North America	(United Kingdom) Oliver Jarvis (Italy) Marco Bonanomi	Audi R18 ultra	M	159	+1 Lap
3	LMP1	4	(Germany) Audi Sport North America	(United Kingdom) Oliver Jarvis (Italy) Marco Bonanomi	Audi TDI 3.7 L Turbo V6 (Diesel)	M	159	+1 Lap
4	LMP1	2	(Germany) Audi Sport Team Joest	(United Kingdom) Allan McNish (Denmark) Tom Kristensen (Italy) Rinaldo Capello	Audi R18 e-tron quattro	M	159	+1 Lap
4	LMP1	2	(Germany) Audi Sport Team Joest	(United Kingdom) Allan McNish (Denmark) Tom Kristensen (Italy) Rinaldo Capello	Audi TDI 3.7 L Turbo V6 (Hybrid Diesel)	M	159	+1 Lap
5	LMP1	12	(Switzerland) Rebellion Racing	(France) Nicolas Prost (Switzerland) Neel Jani (Germany) Nick Heidfeld	Lola B12/60	M	156	+4 Laps
5	LMP1	12	(Switzerland) Rebellion Racing	(France) Nicolas Prost (Switzerland) Neel Jani (Germany) Nick Heidfeld	Toyota RV8KLM 3.4 L V8	M	156	+4 Laps
6	LMP1	13	(Switzerland) Rebellion Racing	(Italy) Andrea Belicchi (Switzerland) Harold Primat	Lola B12/60	M	155	+5 Laps
6	LMP1	13	(Switzerland) Rebellion Racing	(Italy) Andrea Belicchi (Switzerland) Harold Primat	Toyota RV8KLM 3.4 L V8	M	155	+5 Laps
7	LMP1	21	(United Kingdom) Strakka Racing	(United Kingdom) Nick Leventis (United Kingdom) Jonny Kane (United Kingdom) Danny Watts	HPD ARX-03a	M	154	+6 Laps
7	LMP1	21	(United Kingdom) Strakka Racing	(United Kingdom) Nick Leventis (United Kingdom) Jonny Kane (United Kingdom) Danny Watts	Honda LM-V8 3.4 L V8	M	154	+6 Laps
8	**LMP2**	**38**	**(United Kingdom) Jota**	**(United Kingdom) Sam Hancock (United Kingdom) Simon Dolan**	**Zytek Z11SN**	D	**151**	**+9 Laps**
8	**LMP2**	**38**	**(United Kingdom) Jota**	**(United Kingdom) Sam Hancock (United Kingdom) Simon Dolan**	**Nissan VK45DE 4.5 L V8**	D	**151**	**+9 Laps**
9	LMP2	25	(United Kingdom) ADR-Delta	(Australia) John Martin (United Kingdom) Robbie Kerr (Thailand) Tor Graves	Oreca 03	D	151	+9 Laps
9	LMP2	25	(United Kingdom) ADR-Delta	(Australia) John Martin (United Kingdom) Robbie Kerr (Thailand) Tor Graves	Nissan VK45DE 4.5 L V8	D	151	+9 Laps
10	LMP2	48	(Republic of Ireland) Murphy Prototypes	(United Kingdom) Warren Hughes (United Kingdom) Jody Firth (New Zealand) Brendon Hartley	Oreca 03	D	151	+9 Laps
10	LMP2	48	(Republic of Ireland) Murphy Prototypes	(United Kingdom) Warren Hughes (United Kingdom) Jody Firth (New Zealand) Brendon Hartley	Nissan VK45DE 4.5 L V8	D	151	+9 Laps
11	LMP2	35	(France) OAK Racing	(Denmark) David Heinemeier Hansson (Belgium) Bas Leinders	Morgan LMP2	D	150	+10 Laps
11	LMP2	35	(France) OAK Racing	(Denmark) David Heinemeier Hansson (Belgium) Bas Leinders	Judd HK 3.6 L V8	D	150	+10 Laps
12	LMP1	22	(United Kingdom) JRM	(United Kingdom) Peter Dumbreck (Australia) David Brabham (India) Karun Chandhok	HPD ARX-03a	M	150	+10 Laps
12	LMP1	22	(United Kingdom) JRM	(United Kingdom) Peter Dumbreck (Australia) David Brabham (India) Karun Chandhok	Honda LM-V8 3.4 L V8	M	150	+10 Laps
13	LMP2	45	(Belgium) Boutsen Ginion Racing	(France) Bastien Brière (United Kingdom) Jack Clarke (Germany) Jens Petersen	Oreca 03	D	149	+11 Laps
13	LMP2	45	(Belgium) Boutsen Ginion Racing	(France) Bastien Brière (United Kingdom) Jack Clarke (Germany) Jens Petersen	Nissan VK45DE 4.5 L V8	D	149	+11 Laps
14	LMP2	28	(United Arab Emirates) Gulf Racing Middle East	(France) Fabien Giroix (France) Maxime Jousse (Sweden) Stefan Johansson	Lola B12/80	D	148	+12 Laps
14	LMP2	28	(United Arab Emirates) Gulf Racing Middle East	(France) Fabien Giroix (France) Maxime Jousse (Sweden) Stefan Johansson	Nissan VK45DE 4.5 L V8	D	148	+12 Laps
15	LMP1	17	(France) Pescarolo Team	(France) Nicolas Minassian (France) Sébastien Bourdais	Dome S102.5	M	147	+13 Laps
15	LMP1	17	(France) Pescarolo Team	(France) Nicolas Minassian (France) Sébastien Bourdais	Judd DB 3.4 L V8	M	147	+13 Laps
16	LMP2	41	(United Kingdom) Greaves Motorsport	(Germany) Christian Zugel (Mexico) Ricardo González (Ecuador) Elton Julian	Zytek Z11SN	D	147	+13 Laps
16	LMP2	41	(United Kingdom) Greaves Motorsport	(Germany) Christian Zugel (Mexico) Ricardo González (Ecuador) Elton Julian	Nissan VK45DE 4.5 L V8	D	147	+13 Laps
17	LMP2	24	(France) OAK Racing	(France) Jacques Nicolet (France) Olivier Pla (France) Matthieu Lahaye	Morgan LMP2	D	144	+16 Laps
17	LMP2	24	(France) OAK Racing	(France) Jacques Nicolet (France) Olivier Pla (France) Matthieu Lahaye	Judd HK 3.6 L V8	D	144	+16 Laps
18	**LMGTE; Pro**	**77**	**(Germany) Team Felbermayr-Proton**	**(Germany) Marc Lieb (Austria) Richard Lietz**	**Porsche 997 GT3-RSR**	M	**144**	**+16 Laps**
18	**LMGTE; Pro**	**77**	**(Germany) Team Felbermayr-Proton**	**(Germany) Marc Lieb (Austria) Richard Lietz**	**Porsche M97/74 4.0 L Flat-6**	M	**144**	**+16 Laps**
19	LMGTE; Pro	51	(Italy) AF Corse	(Italy) Giancarlo Fisichella (Italy) Gianmaria Bruni	Ferrari 458 Italia GT2	M	144	+16 Laps
19	LMGTE; Pro	51	(Italy) AF Corse	(Italy) Giancarlo Fisichella (Italy) Gianmaria Bruni	Ferrari F136 4.5 L V8	M	144	+16 Laps
20	LMGTE; Pro	59	(France) Luxury Racing	(France) Frédéric Makowiecki (Brazil) Jaime Melo	Ferrari 458 Italia GT2	M	143	+17 Laps
20	LMGTE; Pro	59	(France) Luxury Racing	(France) Frédéric Makowiecki (Brazil) Jaime Melo	Ferrari F136 4.5 L V8	M	143	+17 Laps
21	LMGTE; Pro	71	(Italy) AF Corse	(Italy) Andrea Bertolini (Monaco) Olivier Beretta	Ferrari 458 Italia GT2	M	141	+19 Laps
21	LMGTE; Pro	71	(Italy) AF Corse	(Italy) Andrea Bertolini (Monaco) Olivier Beretta	Ferrari F136 4.5 L V8	M	141	+19 Laps
22	**LMGTE; Am**	**67**	**(France) IMSA Performance Matmut**	**(France) Anthony Pons (France) Nicolas Armindo (France) Raymond Narac**	**Porsche 997 GT3-RSR**	M	**139**	**+21 Laps**
22	**LMGTE; Am**	**67**	**(France) IMSA Performance Matmut**	**(France) Anthony Pons (France) Nicolas Armindo (France) Raymond Narac**	**Porsche M97/74 4.0 L Flat-6**	M	**139**	**+21 Laps**
23	LMP2	29	(United Arab Emirates) Gulf Racing Middle East (Note: Fabien Giroix was injured during a simulated driver change in the pit lane and was not replaced as a driver of the No. 29 Gulf Racing Middle East car.)	(Japan) Keiko Ihara (Switzerland) Jean-Denis Délétraz	Lola B12/80	D	139	+21 Laps
23	LMP2	29	(United Arab Emirates) Gulf Racing Middle East	(Japan) Keiko Ihara (Switzerland) Jean-Denis Délétraz	Nissan VK45DE 4.5 L V8	D	139	+21 Laps
24	LMGTE; Am	88	(Germany) Team Felbermayr-Proton	(Germany) Christian Ried (Italy) Gianluca Roda (Italy) Paolo Ruberti	Porsche 997 GT3-RSR	M	139	+21 Laps
24	LMGTE; Am	88	(Germany) Team Felbermayr-Proton	(Germany) Christian Ried (Italy) Gianluca Roda (Italy) Paolo Ruberti	Porsche M97/74 4.0 L Flat-6	M	139	+21 Laps
25	LMP2	49	(Argentina) Pecom Racing	(Argentina) Luís Pérez Companc (France) Soheil Ayari (Germany) Pierre Kaffer	Oreca 03	D	139	+21 Laps
25	LMP2	49	(Argentina) Pecom Racing	(Argentina) Luís Pérez Companc (France) Soheil Ayari (Germany) Pierre Kaffer	Nissan VK45DE 4.5 L V8	D	139	+21 Laps
26	LMGTE; Am	81	(Italy) AF Corse	(Italy) Piergiuseppe Perazzini (Italy) Marco Cioci (Republic of Ireland) Matt Griffin	Ferrari 458 Italia GT2	M	138	+22 Laps
26	LMGTE; Am	81	(Italy) AF Corse	(Italy) Piergiuseppe Perazzini (Italy) Marco Cioci (Republic of Ireland) Matt Griffin	Ferrari F136 4.5 L V8	M	138	+22 Laps
27	LMGTE; Am	50	(France) Larbre Compétition	(France) Patrick Bornhauser (France) Julien Canal (Brazil) Fernando Rees	Chevrolet Corvette C6.R	M	137	+23 Laps
27	LMGTE; Am	50	(France) Larbre Compétition	(France) Patrick Bornhauser (France) Julien Canal (Brazil) Fernando Rees	Corvette LS5.5R 5.5 L V8	M	137	+23 Laps
28	LMGTE; Am	58	(France) Luxury Racing	(Germany) Pierre Ehret (United States) Frankie Montecalvo (United States) Gunnar Jeannette	Ferrari 458 Italia GT2	M	137	+23 Laps
28	LMGTE; Am	58	(France) Luxury Racing	(Germany) Pierre Ehret (United States) Frankie Montecalvo (United States) Gunnar Jeannette	Ferrari F136 4.5 L V8	M	137	+23 Laps
29	LMP2	32	(Germany) Lotus	(Italy) Luca Moro (United States) Kevin Weeda (United Kingdom) James Rossiter	Lola B12/80	D	137	+23 Laps
29	LMP2	32	(Germany) Lotus	(Italy) Luca Moro (United States) Kevin Weeda (United Kingdom) James Rossiter	Lotus 3.6 L V8	D	137	+23 Laps
30	LMP2	26	(France) Signatech-Nissan	(France) Pierre Ragues (France) Nelson Panciatici (Russia) Roman Rusinov	Oreca 03	D	136	+24 Laps
30	LMP2	26	(France) Signatech-Nissan	(France) Pierre Ragues (France) Nelson Panciatici (Russia) Roman Rusinov	Nissan VK45DE 4.5 L V8	D	136	+24 Laps
31	LMGTE; Am	55	(United Kingdom) JWA-Avila	(United Kingdom) Paul Daniels (Switzerland) Joël Camathias (Finland) Markus Palttala	Porsche 997 GT3-RSR	P	134	+26 Laps
31	LMGTE; Am	55	(United Kingdom) JWA-Avila	(United Kingdom) Paul Daniels (Switzerland) Joël Camathias (Finland) Markus Palttala	Porsche M97/74 4.0 L Flat-6	P	134	+26 Laps
32	LMGTE; Am	57	(United States) Krohn Racing	(United States) Tracy Krohn (Sweden) Niclas Jönsson (Italy) Michele Rugolo	Ferrari 458 Italia GT2	D	129	+31 Laps
32	LMGTE; Am	57	(United States) Krohn Racing	(United States) Tracy Krohn (Sweden) Niclas Jönsson (Italy) Michele Rugolo	Ferrari F136 4.5 L V8	D	129	+31 Laps
33	LMP2	23	(France) Signatech-Nissan	(France) Franck Mailleux (France) Jordan Tresson (France) Olivier Lombard	Oreca 03	D	128	+32 Laps
33	LMP2	23	(France) Signatech-Nissan	(France) Franck Mailleux (France) Jordan Tresson (France) Olivier Lombard	Nissan VK45DE 4.5 L V8	D	128	+32 Laps
34	LMP2	44	(United States) Starworks Motorsport	(United Kingdom) Ryan Dalziel (Venezuela) Enzo Potolicchio (France) Stéphane Sarrazin	HPD ARX-03b	D	123	+37 Laps
34	LMP2	44	(United States) Starworks Motorsport	(United Kingdom) Ryan Dalziel (Venezuela) Enzo Potolicchio (France) Stéphane Sarrazin	Honda HR28TT 2.8 L Turbo V6	D	123	+37 Laps
DNF	LMP1	15	(France) OAK Racing	(France) Guillaume Moreau (Austria) Dominik Kraihamer (Belgium) Bertrand Baguette	OAK Pescarolo 01	D	151	Suspension
DNF	LMP1	15	(France) OAK Racing	(France) Guillaume Moreau (Austria) Dominik Kraihamer (Belgium) Bertrand Baguette	Judd DB 3.4 L V8	D	151	Suspension
DNF	LMP2	31	(Germany) Lotus	(Germany) Thomas Holzer (Germany) Mirco Schultis (Netherlands) Renger van der Zande	Lola B12/80	D	124	Accident
DNF	LMP2	31	(Germany) Lotus	(Germany) Thomas Holzer (Germany) Mirco Schultis (Netherlands) Renger van der Zande	Lotus 3.6 L V8	D	124	Accident
DNF	LMP2	43	(France) Extrême Limite ARIC	(France) Philippe Haezebrouck (France) Philippe Thirion	Norma M200P	D	83	Accident
DNF	LMP2	43	(France) Extrême Limite ARIC	(France) Philippe Haezebrouck (France) Philippe Thirion	Judd HK 3.6 L V8	D	83	Accident
DNF	LMP2	40	(Switzerland) Race Performance	(Switzerland) Michel Frey (Switzerland) Jonathan Hirschi (Switzerland) Ralph Meichtry	Oreca 03	D	45	Gearbox
DNF	LMP2	40	(Switzerland) Race Performance	(Switzerland) Michel Frey (Switzerland) Jonathan Hirschi (Switzerland) Ralph Meichtry	Judd HK 3.6 L V8	D	45	Gearbox
DNF	LMGTE; Am	70	(France) Larbre Compétition	(France) Christophe Bourret (France) Jean-Philippe Belloc	Chevrolet Corvette C6.R	M	39	Engine
DNF	LMGTE; Am	70	(France) Larbre Compétition	(France) Christophe Bourret (France) Jean-Philippe Belloc	Corvette LS5.5R 5.5 L V8	M	39	Engine
DNF	LMGTE; Pro	97	(United Kingdom) Aston Martin Racing	(Germany) Stefan Mücke (Mexico) Adrián Fernández (United Kingdom) Darren Turner	Aston Martin Vantage GTE	M	11	Gearbox
DNF	LMGTE; Pro	97	(United Kingdom) Aston Martin Racing	(Germany) Stefan Mücke (Mexico) Adrián Fernández (United Kingdom) Darren Turner	Aston Martin AM05 4.5 L V8	M	11	Gearbox
DNS	LMGTE; Am	61	(Italy) AF Corse-Waltrip	(United States) Robert Kauffman (United States) Brian Vickers (Portugal) Rui Águas	Ferrari 458 Italia GT2	M	–	Did not start (Accident) (Note: The No. 61 AF Corse-Waltrip Ferrari was withdrawn from the race due to damage caused by a crash in the warm-up session that could not be repaired in time.)
DNS	LMGTE; Am	61	(Italy) AF Corse-Waltrip	(United States) Robert Kauffman (United States) Brian Vickers (Portugal) Rui Águas	Ferrari F136 4.5 L V8	M	–	Did not start (Accident)
DNS	LMP2	30	(Republic of Ireland) Status GP	(United Kingdom) Alexander Sims (Netherlands) Yelmer Buurman (France) Romain Iannetta	Lola B12/80	D	–	Did not start (Accident)
DNS	LMP2	30	(Republic of Ireland) Status GP	(United Kingdom) Alexander Sims (Netherlands) Yelmer Buurman (France) Romain Iannetta	Judd HK 3.6 L V8	D	–	Did not start (Accident)

Tyre manufacturers
Key
Symbol	Tyre manufacturer
**D**	Dunlop
**M**	Michelin
**P**	Pirelli

== Championship standings after the race ==
World Drivers' Championship standings
Pos.	+/-	Driver	Points
1	1	(France) Romain Dumas (France) Loïc Duval	43
2	1	(Italy) Rinaldo Capello (Denmark) Tom Kristensen (United Kingdom) Allan McNish	41 (−2)
3	19	(Spain) Marc Gené	25 (−18)
4	6	(Switzerland) Marcel Fässler (Germany) André Lotterer (France) Benoît Tréluyer	19.5 (−23.5)
5	3	(Germany) Timo Bernhard	18 (−25)

LMP1 Manufacturers' World Championship standings
Pos.	+/-	Manufacturer	Points
1		(Germany) Audi	52

LMGTE Manufacturers' World Cup standings
Pos.	+/-	Manufacturer	Points
1	1	(Germany) Porsche	68
2	1	(Italy) Ferrari	67 (−1)
3		(United States) Chevrolet	30 (−38)

Endurance Trophy for LMP1 Teams standings
Pos.	+/-	Team	Points
1	3	(Switzerland) Rebellion Racing	37
2		(United Kingdom) Strakka Racing	33 (−4)
3		(United Kingdom) JRM	27 (−10)
4	3	(France) Pescarolo Team	25 (−12)
5		(France) OAK Racing	8 (−29)

Endurance Trophy For LMP2 Teams standings
Pos.	+/-	Team	Points
1	4	(United Kingdom) ADR-Delta	35
2		(France) OAK Racing	31 (−4)
3	2	(United States) Starworks Motorsport	29 (−6)
4		(United Kingdom) Greaves Motorsport	27 (−8)
5	2	(United Arab Emirates) Gulf Racing Middle East	24 (−11)

Endurance Trophy For LMGTE Pro Teams standings
Pos.	+/-	Team	Points
1		(Italy) AF Corse	43
2		(Germany) Team Felbermayr-Proton	43 (−0)
3	1	(France) Luxury Racing	16 (−27)
4	1	(United Kingdom) Aston Martin Racing	15 (−18)

Endurance Trophy For LMGTE Am Teams standings
Pos.	+/-	Team	Points
1		(Germany) Team Felbermayr-Proton	50
2		(France) Larbre Compétition	36 (−14)
3	2	(United Kingdom) JWA-Avila	20 (−30)
4		(United States) Krohn Racing	20 (−30)
5	1	(France) Luxury Racing	17 (−33)

== Footnotes ==
FIA World Endurance Championship
Previous race: 12 Hours of Sebring	2012 season	Next race: 24 Hours of Le Mans
