= 2005 Monaco Grand Prix Formula Three =

2005 Monaco Grand Prix Formula Three Race 1
- Race 4 of 10 in the 2005 Formula 3 Euro Series

Race details
- Date: 20 May 2005
- Location: Circuit de Monaco, Monte Carlo, Monaco
- Course: Street circuit
- Course length: 3.340 km (2.075 miles)
- Distance: 18 laps, 60.12 km ( miles)

Pole position
| Driver | (United Kingdom) Lewis Hamilton | ASM Formule 3 |
- Time: 1:28.593

Fastest lap
| Driver | (Germany) Adrian Sutil | ASM Formule 3 |
- Time: 1:28.017 on lap 17

Podium
| First | (United Kingdom) Lewis Hamilton | ASM Formule 3 |
| Second | (Germany) Adrian Sutil | ASM Formule 3 |
| Third | (France) Loïc Duval | Signature-Plus |

Race 2

Race details
- Date: 21 May 2005
- Distance: 26 laps, 86.84 km ( miles)

Fastest lap
| Driver | (United Kingdom) Lewis Hamilton | ASM Formule 3 |
- Time: 1:28.797 on lap 9

Podium
| First | (United Kingdom) Lewis Hamilton | ASM Formule 3 |
| Second | (France) Loïc Duval | Signature-Plus |
| Third | (France) Franck Perera | Prema Powerteam |

The 2005 Monaco Grand Prix Formula Three was a Formula 3 Euro Series motor race held on 20 and 21 May 2005 at the Circuit de Monaco in Monte Carlo, Monaco. It was the fourth race of the 2005 Formula 3 Euro Series. It was the first time Formula Three cars had raced at Monaco since 1997, and remains the last to date. The race was used to support the 2005 Monaco Grand Prix.

== Results ==
=== Qualifying ===
| Pos. | No. | Driver | Team | Time | Gap | Grid |
|---|---|---|---|---|---|---|
| 1 | 1 | (United Kingdom) Lewis Hamilton | ASM Formule 3 | 1:28.593 | | 1 |
| 2 | 2 | (Germany) Adrian Sutil | ASM Formule 3 | 1:29.202 | +0.609 | 2 |
| 3 | 3 | (France) Loïc Duval | Signature-Plus | 1:29.316 | +0.723 | 3 |
| 4 | 23 | (France) Franck Perera | Prema Powerteam | 1:29.523 | +0.930 | 4 |
| 5 | 4 | (United Kingdom) James Rossiter | Signature-Plus | 1:29.640 | +1.047 | 5 |
| 6 | 14 | (Brazil) Fabio Carbone | Signature | 1:29.976 | +1.383 | 6 |
| 7 | 7 | (Brazil) Lucas di Grassi | Manor Motorsport | 1:30.069 | +1.476 | 7 |
| 8 | 8 | (United Kingdom) Paul di Resta | Manor Motorsport | 1:30.120 | +1.527 | 8 |
| 9 | 17 | (Germany) Maximilian Götz | HBR Motorsport | 1:30.186 | +1.593 | 9 |
| 10 | 15 | (France) Guillaume Moreau | Signature | 1:30.195 | +1.602 | 10 |
| 11 | 16 | (Spain) Alejandro Núñez | HBR Motorsport | 1:30.274 | +1.681 | 11 |
| 12 | 19 | (United States) Richard Antinucci | Team Midland Euroseries | 1:30.322 | +1.729 | 12 |
| 13 | 9 | (Germany) Sebastian Vettel | ASL Mucke Motorsport | 1:30.379 | +1.786 | 13 |
| 14 | 6 | (Netherlands) Giedo van der Garde | Team Rosberg | 1:30.642 | +2.049 | 14 |
| 15 | 10 | (Brazil) Átila Abreu | ASL Mucke Motorsport | 1:30.695 | +2.102 | 15 |
| 16 | 11 | (Belgium) Greg Franchi | Prema Powerteam | 1:30.931 | +2.338 | 16 |
| 17 | 24 | (Netherlands) Ross Zwolsman | Ross Zwolsman | 1:30.965 | +2.372 | 17 |
| 18 | 12 | (Italy) Marco Bonanomi | Prema Powerteam | 1:30.974 | +2.381 | 18 |
| 19 | 5 | (Japan) Kohei Hirate | Team Rosberg | 1:31.182 | +2.589 | 19 |
| 20 | 25 | (Czech Republic) Filip Salaquarda | Team I.S.R. | 1:32.203 | +3.610 | 20 |
| 21 | 20 | (Germany) Thomas Holzer | AM-Holzer Rennsport | 1:32.350 | +3.757 | 21 |
| 22 | 22 | (Austria) Hannes Neuhauser | HBR Motorsport | 1:32.664 | +4.071 | 22 |
| 23 | 18 | (Argentina) Esteban Guerrieri | Team Midland Euroseries | 1:36.365 | +7.772 | 23 |
Lähde:

=== Race 1 ===
| Pos | No | Driver | Team | Laps | Time/Retired | Grid | Points |
|---|---|---|---|---|---|---|---|
| 1 | 1 | (United Kingdom) Lewis Hamilton | ASM Formule 3 | 18 | 28:42.069 | 1 | 10+1 |
| 2 | 2 | (Germany) Adrian Sutil | ASM Formule 3 | 18 | +1.777 | 2 | 8 |
| 3 | 3 | (France) Loïc Duval | Signature-Plus | 18 | +12.525 | 3 | 6 |
| 4 | 4 | (United Kingdom) James Rossiter | Signature-Plus | 18 | +13.514 | 5 | 5 |
| 5 | 23 | (France) Franck Perera | Prema Powerteam | 18 | +18.540 | 4 | 4 |
| 6 | 14 | (Brazil) Fabio Carbone | Signature | 18 | +21.869 | 6 | 3 |
| 7 | 7 | (Brazil) Lucas di Grassi | Manor Motorsport | 18 | +24.121 | 7 | 2 |
| 8 | 8 | (United Kingdom) Paul di Resta | Manor Motorsport | 18 | +24.630 | 8 | 1 |
| 9 | 19 | (United States) Richard Antinucci | Team Midland Euroseries | 18 | +25.189 | 12 | |
| 10 | 16 | (Spain) Alejandro Núñez | HBR Motorsport | 18 | +27.306 | 11 | |
| 11 | 6 | (Netherlands) Giedo van der Garde | Team Rosberg | 18 | +29.188 | 14 | |
| 12 | 24 | (Netherlands) Ross Zwolsman | Ross Zwolsman | 18 | +29.570 | 17 | |
| 13 | 12 | (Italy) Marco Bonanomi | Prema Powerteam | 18 | +31.372 | 18 | |
| 14 | 22 | (Austria) Hannes Neuhauser | HBR Motorsport | 18 | +38.266 | 22 | |
| 15 | 17 | (Germany) Maximilian Götz | HBR Motorsport | 18 | +38.619 | 9 | |
| 16 | 5 | (Japan) Kohei Hirate | Team Rosberg | 18 | +40.692 | 19 | |
| 17 | 18 | (Argentina) Esteban Guerrieri | Team Midland Euroseries | 18 | +41.238 | 23 | |
| 18 | 9 | (Germany) Sebastian Vettel | ASL Mucke Motorsport | 18 | +43.023 | 13 | |
| 19 | 25 | (Czech Republic) Filip Salaquarda | Team I.S.R. | 14 | +4 laps | 20 | |
| Ret | 10 | (Brazil) Átila Abreu | ASL Mucke Motorsport | 11 | Retired | 15 | |
| Ret | 11 | (Belgium) Greg Franchi | Prema Powerteam | 10 | Retired | 16 | |
| Ret | 20 | (Germany) Thomas Holzer | AM-Holzer Rennsport | 5 | Retired | 21 | |
| Ret | 15 | (France) Guillaume Moreau | Signature | 3 | Retired | 10 | |
Lähde:

=== Race 2 ===
| Pos | No | Driver | Team | Laps | Time/Retired | Grid | Points |
|---|---|---|---|---|---|---|---|
| 1 | 1 | (United Kingdom) Lewis Hamilton | ASM Formule 3 | 26 | 39:04.191 | 1 | 10 |
| 2 | 3 | (France) Loïc Duval | Signature-Plus | 26 | +7.644 | 3 | 8 |
| 3 | 23 | (France) Franck Perera | Prema Powerteam | 26 | +10.513 | 4 | 6 |
| 4 | 4 | (United Kingdom) James Rossiter | Signature-Plus | 26 | +11.182 | 5 | 5 |
| 5 | 7 | (Brazil) Lucas di Grassi | Manor Motorsport | 26 | +35.733 | 7 | 4 |
| 6 | 8 | (United Kingdom) Paul di Resta | Manor Motorsport | 26 | +36.588 | 8 | 3 |
| 7 | 17 | (Germany) Maximilian Götz | HBR Motorsport | 26 | +41.615 | 9 | 2 |
| 8 | 16 | (Spain) Alejandro Núñez | HBR Motorsport | 26 | +46.840 | 11 | 1 |
| 9 | 24 | (Netherlands) Ross Zwolsman | Ross Zwolsman | 26 | +47.547 | 17 | |
| 10 | 18 | (Argentina) Esteban Guerrieri | Team Midland Euroseries | 26 | +49.660 | 23 | |
| 11 | 10 | (Brazil) Átila Abreu | ASL Mucke Motorsport | 26 | +59.876 | 15 | |
| 12 | 14 | (Brazil) Fabio Carbone | Signature | 26 | +1:03.893^{1} | 6 | |
| 13 | 25 | (Czech Republic) Filip Salaquarda | Team I.S.R. | 26 | +1:18.852 | 20 | |
| 14 | 20 | (Germany) Thomas Holzer | AM-Holzer Rennsport | 25 | +1 lap | 21 | |
| 15 | 22 | (Austria) Hannes Neuhauser | HBR Motorsport | 25 | +1 lap | 22 | |
| 16 | 12 | (Italy) Marco Bonanomi | Prema Powerteam | 23 | +3 laps | 18 | |
| 17 | 9 | (Germany) Sebastian Vettel | ASL Mucke Motorsport | 19 | +7 laps | 13 | |
| Ret | 2 | (Germany) Adrian Sutil | ASM Formule 3 | 18 | Retired | 2 | |
| Ret | 6 | (Netherlands) Giedo van der Garde | Team Rosberg | 10 | Retired | 14 | |
| Ret | 19 | (United States) Richard Antinucci | Team Midland Euroseries | 8 | Retired | 12 | |
| Ret | 15 | (France) Guillaume Moreau | Signature | 8 | Retired | 10 | |
| Ret | 5 | (Japan) Kohei Hirate | Team Rosberg | 3 | Retired | 19 | |
| Ret | 11 | (Belgium) Greg Franchi | Prema Powerteam | 0 | Retired | 16 | |
Lähde:

Notes

- ^1 – Fabio Carbone finished in 5th place but suffered a 30 second penalty for missing the chicane.

== Standings after the round ==
Drivers' Championship standings

| | Pos | Driver | Points |
|---|---|---|---|
| | 1 | (United Kingdom) Lewis Hamilton | 69 |
| 1 | 2 | (United Kingdom) James Rossiter | 45 |
| 1 | 3 | (Germany) Adrian Sutil | 43 |
| | 4 | (France) Loïc Duval | 39 |
| 2 | 5 | (France) Franck Perera | 20 |

Teams' Championship standings

| | Pos | Team | Points |
|---|---|---|---|
| | 1 | (France) ASM Formule 3 | 108 |
| | 2 | (France) Signature-Plus | 84 |
| 1 | 3 | (Italy) Prema Powerteam | 28 |
| 2 | 4 | (United Kingdom) Manor Motorsport | 26 |
| 2 | 5 | (France) Signature | 24 |

- Note: Only the top five positions are included for both sets of standings.

== See also ==
- 2005 Monaco Grand Prix
- 2005 Monaco GP2 Series round
- 2005 Monaco Porsche Supercup round
