= 2005 Formula 3 Euro Series =

Motorsport season

The 2005 Formula 3 Euro Series season was the third championship year of Europe's premier Formula Three series. The championship consisted of ten rounds – each with two races – held at a variety of European circuits. Each weekend consisted of one 60-minute practice session and two 30-minute qualifying sessions (one at Monaco), followed by one c.110 km race and one c.80 km race. Each qualifying session awarded one bonus point for pole position and each race awarded points for the top eight finishers, with ten points per win. Lewis Hamilton dominated the season, winning 15 of the 20 races and scoring nearly twice as many points as his nearest rival, team-mate Adrian Sutil. As of now, six drivers (Hamilton, Sutil, Sebastian Vettel, Paul di Resta, Lucas di Grassi, and Giedo van der Garde) have competed in Formula One.

== Summary ==
The 2005 calendar included events at the historic circuits of Pau (France), Spa-Fracorchamps (Belgium), Zandvoort (Netherlands) and Monaco. Monaco has a long tradition of Formula 3 events, but this was the first since 1997. The debut of a new street circuit in the French town of Avignon was to take place in September, but the plans fell through and its date was given to the Lausitzring.

Thirteen countries were represented in the drivers' entry list, which included drivers from Argentina, the USA and the Czech Republic for the first time. There were teams from France, Germany, Britain, Austria, Italy, Netherlands, Luxembourg and the Czech Republic.

After a promising debut season with Manor Motorsport that ended with a win in the non-championship Bahrain F3 Superprix, and a contract with ASM for 2005, Lewis Hamilton was regarded as the championship favourite. He exceeded expectations by winning 15 races from 20 starts, securing 13 pole positions, posting ten fastest race laps, and scoring nearly twice as many points as his nearest rival, team-mate Adrian Sutil. Lucas di Grassi made a full-time return to the series (he entered two rounds in 2003) and finished in 3rd place overall, with one win. The highest-placed rookie was the then-reigning Formula BMW Germany champion Sebastian Vettel, who was classified 5th overall with six podium finishes. He was beaten to 4th place by Franck Perera's more consistent points finishes.

In the Teams’ Championship, ASM Formule 3 retained the title that it had secured in 2004, with Signature in a distant second place. Third place was taken by Prema Powerteam, which had won the Euro Series' first teams' title in 2003. Manor Motorsport was classified 4th overall, as it continued to improve its form against rivals with more experience in Europe. At this time, the Spiess-Opel engine was still numerically dominant, but won on only two occasions. HWA-Mercedes had begun to gain the upper hand in 2004 (with 13 wins from 20 races), and increased its development effort to win 18 races in 2005.

== Teams and drivers ==
2005 Entry List
Team	#	Driver	Rookie	Chassis (Note: All drivers competed in Dallara chassis (except Fabio Carbone, who used SLC chassis); model listed.)	Engine	Rounds
(France) ASM Formule 3	1	(United Kingdom) Lewis Hamilton		F305/021	Mercedes	All
(France) ASM Formule 3	2	(Germany) Adrian Sutil		F305/059	Mercedes	1–9
(France) ASM Formule 3	2	(Germany) Maximilian Götz		F305/059	Mercedes	10
(France) Signature-Plus	3	(France) Loïc Duval		F305/036	Opel	All
(France) Signature-Plus	4	(United Kingdom) James Rossiter		F305/029	Opel	All
(Germany) Team Rosberg	5	(Japan) Kohei Hirate		F305/003	Opel	All
(Germany) Team Rosberg	6	(Netherlands) Giedo van der Garde		F305/039	Opel	All
(United Kingdom) Manor Motorsport	7	(Brazil) Lucas di Grassi		F305/025; F305/062	Mercedes	All
(United Kingdom) Manor Motorsport	8	(United Kingdom) Paul di Resta	R	F305/020	Mercedes	All
(Germany) ASL Mücke Motorsport	9	(Germany) Sebastian Vettel	R	F305/011	Mercedes	All
(Germany) ASL Mücke Motorsport	10	(Brazil) Átila Abreu	R	F305/028	Mercedes	All
(Italy) Prema Powerteam	11	(Belgium) Greg Franchi		F305/004	Opel	All
(Italy) Prema Powerteam	12	(Italy) Marco Bonanomi		F305/026	Opel	All
(Italy) Prema Powerteam	23	(France) Franck Perera		F305/023	Opel	All
(France) Signature	14	(Brazil) Fabio Carbone		R1/001	Opel	All
(France) Signature	15	(France) Guillaume Moreau	R	F305/035	Opel	All
(Austria) HBR Motorsport	16	(Spain) Alejandro Núñez		F305/027	Opel	All
(Austria) HBR Motorsport	17	(Germany) Maximilian Götz		F305/040	Opel	1–4
(Austria) HBR Motorsport	17	(United Kingdom) Danny Watts		F305/040	Opel	7
(Austria) HBR Motorsport	22	(Austria) Hannes Neuhauser		F305/045	Opel	All
(Luxembourg) Team Midland Euroseries	18	(Argentina) Esteban Guerrieri	R	F305/034	TOM's Toyota	All
(Luxembourg) Team Midland Euroseries	19	(United States) Richard Antinucci		F305/001	TOM's Toyota	1–4
(Luxembourg) Team Midland Euroseries	19	(Belgium) Nico Verdonck		F305/001	TOM's Toyota	5–6
(Luxembourg) Team Midland Euroseries	19	(United Kingdom) Stephen Jelley		F305/001	TOM's Toyota	7
(Luxembourg) Team Midland Euroseries	19	(United Kingdom) Rob Austin		F305/001	TOM's Toyota	8–9
(Luxembourg) Team Midland Euroseries	19	(United Kingdom) Ben Clucas		F305/001	TOM's Toyota	10
(Germany) AM-Holzer Rennsport	20	(Germany) Thomas Holzer		F305/060	Opel	All
(Netherlands) Ross Zwolsman	24	(Netherlands) Ross Zwolsman		F305/024	Opel	1–4
(Czech Republic) Team I.S.R.	25	(Czech Republic) Filip Salaquarda		F305/046	Opel	All
(Italy) Ombra Racing	26	(Italy) Paolo Montin		F305/064	Honda	9
(Germany) Julia Kuhn	27	(Germany) Julia Kuhn		F305/063	Opel	7, 10

Icon	Legend
R	Rookie

=== Driver changes ===
Changed Teams

- Marco Bonanomi: Team Ghinzani → Prema Powerteam
- Loïc Duval: Signature → Signature Plus
- Gregory Franchi: Signature → Prema Powerteam
- Giedo van der Garde: Signature → Team Rosberg
- Maximilian Götz: TME → HBR Motorsport
- Lewis Hamilton: Manor Motorsport → ASM Formule 3
- Kohei Hirate: Prema Powerteam → Team Rosberg
- Alejandro Núñez: Swiss Racing Team → HBR Motorsport
- Ross Zwolsman: TME – RZ Racing

Entering/Re-Entering Formula 3 Euro Series

- Átila Abreu: Formula BMW ADAC (ADAC Mittelrhein e.V.) → Mücke Motorsport
- Richard Antinucci: All-Japan Formula Three Championship (TOM's) → Team Midland Euroseries
- Rob Austin: British Formula 3 Championship (Menu F3 Motorsport) → Team Midland Euroseries
- Fabio Carbone: All-Japan Formula Three Championship (Three Bond Racing) → Signature
- Ben Clucas: Formula Renault 2.0 Italy (Prema Powerteam) → Team Midland Euroseries
- Lucas di Grassi: British Formula 3 Championship (Hitech Racing) → Manor Motorsport
- Esteban Guerrieri: International Formula 3000 (BCN F3000) → Team Midland Euroseries
- Thomas Holzer: German Formula Three Championship (AM-Holzer Rennsport) → AM-Holzer Rennsport
- Stephen Jelley: British Formula 3 Championship (Performance Racing Europe) → Team Midland Euroseries
- Julia Kuhn: Formula Volkswagen Germany → Kuhn Motorsport
- Paolo Montin: All-Japan Formula Three Championship (Three Bond Racing) → Ombra Racing
- Guillaume Moreau: Championnat de France Formula Renault 2.0 & Eurocup Formula Renault 2.0 (SG Formula)
- Paul di Resta: Formula Renault 2.0 UK (Manor Motorsport) → Manor Motorsport
- James Rossiter: British Formula 3 Championship (Fortec Motorsport) → Signature Plus
- Filip Salaquarda: German Formula Three Championship (Team I.S.R.) → Team I.S.R.
- Nico Verdonck: International Formula 3000 (Team Astromega) → Team Midland Euroseries
- Sebastian Vettel: Formula BMW ADAC (ADAC Berlin-Brandenburg) → Mücke Motorsport
- Danny Watts: British Formula 3 Championship (Promatecme F3) → HBR Motorsport

Leaving Formula 3 Euro Series

- Philipp Baron: Team Ghinzani → Ferrari Challenge Europe – Trofeo Pirelli (Baron Service)
- Ruben Carrapatoso: Opel Team KMS → StockCar Brasil (Katalogo Racing)
- Peter Elkmann: Swiss Racing Team → Recaro Formel 3 Cup (Jo Zeller Racing)
- Dennis Furchheim: Swiss Racing Team → Retirement
- Jamie Green: ASM Formule 3 → Deutsche Tourenwagen Masters (Persson Motorsport)
- Derek Hayes: Team Ghinzani → Retirement
- Katsuyuki Hiranaka: Prema Powerteam → Formula Nippon (Takagi/Cerumo)
- Robert Kath: Opel Team KMS → Recaro Formel 3 Cup (SMS Seyffarth Motorsport)
- Tom Kimber-Smith: Team Kolles → Formula Renault 2.0 Netherlands & Formula Renault 2.0 UK (Team JLR)
- Robert Kubica: Mücke Motorsport → World Series by Renault (Epsilon Euskadi)
- Nicolas Lapierre: Signature → GP2 Series (Arden International)
- Alexandros Margaritis: AB Racing Performance → Deutsche Tourenwagen Masters (Mücke Motorsport)
- Christian Montanari: Coloni F3 → World Series by Renault (Draco Multiracing USA)
- Alexandre Prémat: ASM Formule 3 → GP2 Series (ART Grand Prix)
- Fernando Rees: Swiss Racing Team → World Series by Renault (Interwetten Racing)
- Daniel la Rosa: HBR Motorsport → World Series by Renault (Interwetten Racing)
- Nico Rosberg: Team Rosberg → GP2 Series (ART Grand Prix)
- Eric Salignon: ASM Formule 3 → World Series by Renault (Cram Competition)
- Bruno Spengler: Mücke Motorsport → Deutsche Tourenwagen Masters (Persson Motorsport)
- Roberto Streit: Prema Powerteam → All-Japan Formula Three Championship (Inging)
- Toni Vilander: Coloni F3 → Italian Formula 3000 (Team Astromega & GP Racing) & GP2 Series (Coloni Motorsport)
- Andreas Zuber: Team Rosberg → World Series by Renault (Carlin Motorsport)
- Charles Zwolsman Jr.: Manor Motorsport → Toyota Atlantic Championship Presented by Yokohama (Condor Motorsports)

==== Midseason changes ====
Maximilian Götz left HBR Motorsport after four rounds, to be replaced by Danny Watts, making his Euro Series debut. Watts was able to stay for only one round, and the HBR line-up was subsequently reduced to two cars. Götz returned at the final round as a substitute for Adrian Sutil at ASM. Sutil's absence was due to commitments in the A1 Grand Prix series. Five drivers shared Team Midland's #19 car. Richard Antinucci competed in the first four rounds, before Nico Verdonck of Belgium replaced him at Oschersleben and the Norisring. He in turn was replaced by three British drivers, all Euro Series rookies: Stephen Jelley at the Nürburgring, Rob Austin at the Lausitzring and Zandvoort, and Ben Clucas in the final round of the season at Hockenheim. A number of registered drivers failed to complete the season, including Paulo Montin, who made only two starts with Ombra Racing; and Julia Kuhn, who made two starts in round 1 and attempted (but failed) to qualify for the first race of round 10. RZ Racing left the series after round 9 at Oschersleben.

== Calendar ==
Round		Circuit	Date	Pole position	Fastest lap	Winning driver	Winning team	Winning rookie
1	R1	(Germany) Hockenheimring	16 April	(United Kingdom) Lewis Hamilton	(United Kingdom) Lewis Hamilton	(United Kingdom) Lewis Hamilton	(France) ASM Formule 3	(Brazil) Átila Abreu
1	R2	(Germany) Hockenheimring	17 April	(United Kingdom) Paul di Resta	(United States) Richard Antinucci	(United Kingdom) James Rossiter	(France) Signature Plus	(Germany) Sebastian Vettel
2	R1	(France) Pau Circuit	7 May	(United Kingdom) Lewis Hamilton	(United Kingdom) Lewis Hamilton	(United Kingdom) Lewis Hamilton	(France) ASM Formule 3	(France) Guillaume Moreau
2	R2	(France) Pau Circuit	8 May	(United Kingdom) Lewis Hamilton	(United Kingdom) Lewis Hamilton	(United Kingdom) Lewis Hamilton	(France) ASM Formule 3	(France) Guillaume Moreau
3	R1	(Belgium) Circuit de Spa-Francorchamps	14 May	(United Kingdom) Lewis Hamilton	(Germany) Adrian Sutil	(Germany) Adrian Sutil	(France) ASM Formule 3	(France) Guillaume Moreau
3	R2	(Belgium) Circuit de Spa-Francorchamps	15 May	(Germany) Adrian Sutil	(United Kingdom) Lewis Hamilton	(United Kingdom) Lewis Hamilton	(France) ASM Formule 3	(Brazil) Átila Abreu
4	R1	Circuit de Monaco	20 May	(United Kingdom) Lewis Hamilton	(Germany) Adrian Sutil	(United Kingdom) Lewis Hamilton	(France) ASM Formule 3	(Argentina) Esteban Guerrieri
4	R2	Circuit de Monaco	21 May	(United Kingdom) Lewis Hamilton	(United Kingdom) Lewis Hamilton	(United Kingdom) Lewis Hamilton	(France) ASM Formule 3	(Argentina) Esteban Guerrieri
5	R1	(Germany) Motorsport Arena Oschersleben	25 June	(Brazil) Lucas di Grassi	(Netherlands) Giedo van der Garde	(Brazil) Lucas di Grassi	(United Kingdom) Manor Motorsport	(Germany) Sebastian Vettel
5	R2	(Germany) Motorsport Arena Oschersleben	26 June	(United Kingdom) Lewis Hamilton	(United Kingdom) Lewis Hamilton	(United Kingdom) Lewis Hamilton	(France) ASM Formule 3	(Germany) Sebastian Vettel
6	R1	(Germany) Norisring, Nuremberg	16 July	(United Kingdom) Lewis Hamilton	(United Kingdom) Lewis Hamilton	(United Kingdom) Lewis Hamilton	(France) ASM Formule 3	(Germany) Sebastian Vettel
6	R2	(Germany) Norisring, Nuremberg	17 July	(United Kingdom) Lewis Hamilton	(Germany) Adrian Sutil	(United Kingdom) Lewis Hamilton	(France) ASM Formule 3	(Germany) Sebastian Vettel
7	R1	(Germany) Nürburgring	6 August	(United Kingdom) Paul di Resta	(United Kingdom) Paul di Resta	(Germany) Adrian Sutil	(France) ASM Formule 3	(Brazil) Átila Abreu
7	R2	(Germany) Nürburgring	7 August	(Brazil) Lucas di Grassi	(United Kingdom) Lewis Hamilton	(United Kingdom) Lewis Hamilton	(France) ASM Formule 3	(Germany) Sebastian Vettel
8	R1	(Netherlands) Circuit Park Zandvoort	27 August	(United Kingdom) Lewis Hamilton	(United Kingdom) Paul di Resta	(France) Guillaume Moreau	(France) Signature	(France) Guillaume Moreau
8	R2	(Netherlands) Circuit Park Zandvoort	28 August	(United Kingdom) Lewis Hamilton	(Brazil) Lucas di Grassi	(United Kingdom) Lewis Hamilton	(France) ASM Formule 3	(Germany) Sebastian Vettel
9	R1	(Germany) EuroSpeedway Lausitz	17 September	(Netherlands) Giedo van der Garde	(Argentina) Esteban Guerrieri	(United Kingdom) Lewis Hamilton	(France) ASM Formule 3	(Germany) Sebastian Vettel
9	R2	(Germany) EuroSpeedway Lausitz	18 September	(United Kingdom) Paul di Resta	(United Kingdom) Lewis Hamilton	(United Kingdom) Lewis Hamilton	(France) ASM Formule 3	(France) Guillaume Moreau
10	R1	(Germany) Hockenheimring	22 October	(United Kingdom) Lewis Hamilton	(Germany) Sebastian Vettel	(United Kingdom) Lewis Hamilton	(France) ASM Formule 3	(Argentina) Esteban Guerrieri
10	R2	(Germany) Hockenheimring	23 October	(United Kingdom) Lewis Hamilton	(United Kingdom) Lewis Hamilton	(United Kingdom) Lewis Hamilton	(France) ASM Formule 3	(France) Guillaume Moreau

== Season standings ==
=== Drivers Standings ===
- Points are awarded as follows:

	1	2	3	4	5	6	7	8	PP
Race 1 & 2	10	8	6	5	4	3	2	1	**1**

Pos	Driver	HOC1 (Germany)		PAU (France)		SPA (Belgium)		MON (Monaco)		OSC (Germany)		NOR (Germany)		NÜR (Germany)		ZAN (Netherlands)		LAU (Germany)		HOC2 (Germany)		Pts
1	(United Kingdom) Lewis Hamilton	**1**	3	**1**	**1**	**DSQ**	1	**1**	**1**	3	**1**	**1**	**1**	12	1	**Ret**	**1**	1	1	**1**	**1**	172
2	(Germany) Adrian Sutil	2	20†	Ret	2	1	**2**	2	Ret	2	3	Ret	2	1	3	Ret	11	4	2			94
3	(Brazil) Lucas di Grassi	Ret	DNS	5	7	DSQ	3	7	5	**1**	2	5	6	2	**Ret**	Ret	Ret	8	3	2	Ret	68
4	(France) Franck Perera	Ret	8	Ret	6	6	6	5	3	6	15	4	3	5	6	3	6	5	5	4	5	67
5	(Germany) Sebastian Vettel	15	5	7	11	DSQ	13	18	17†	5	5	2	4	11	2	2	2	3	15	13	3	63
6	(France) Loïc Duval	6	2	2	3	12†	DNS	3	2	Ret	8	Ret	5	6	10	10	16†	12	9	DSQ	4	52
7	(United Kingdom) James Rossiter	4	1	3	4	2	8	4	4	15	13	Ret	7	10	Ret	Ret	10	18	14	5	9	51
8	(France) Guillaume Moreau	9	10	4	8	3	Ret	Ret	Ret	7	11	8	11	16	8	1	4	6	4	Ret	2	47
9	(Netherlands) Giedo van der Garde	Ret	4	6	15†	Ret	17	11	Ret	17	6	Ret	Ret	8	5	Ret	3	**2**	6	Ret	13	34
10	(United Kingdom) Paul di Resta	Ret	**17**	14	DNS	DSQ	5	8	6	4	4	3	8	**23**	Ret	14†	5	Ret	**DSQ**	Ret	DSQ	32
11	(Italy) Marco Bonanomi	3	14	Ret	10	DNS	19	13	16	12	17	6	Ret	9	4	8	9	10	13	6	6	21
12	(Japan) Kohei Hirate	12	11	10	16†	5	4	16	Ret	Ret	9	Ret	Ret	3	7	Ret	DSQ	17	8	12	10	18
13	(Brazil) Fabio Carbone	14	12	16	5	4	DSQ	6	12	9	12	7	18	17	13	Ret	Ret	20	11	Ret	8	15
14	(Germany) Maximilian Götz	5	13	Ret	DSQ	8	11	15	7											3	18†	13
15	(Brazil) Átila Abreu	8	9	11	12	DSQ	12	Ret	11	8	10	9	10	7	17†	5	8	7	12	8	Ret	12
16	(Argentina) Esteban Guerrieri	Ret	6	19	9	7	15	17	10	11	7	11	9	14	12	6	12	16	10	7	17	12
17	(Belgium) Greg Franchi	13	19	15	Ret	DSQ	7	Ret	Ret	18	18	Ret	12	18	9	4	7	13	7	10	12	11
18	(Austria) Hannes Neuhauser	Ret	16	12	DSQ	Ret	9	14	15	Ret	14	Ret	13	4	11	7	17†	9	Ret	9	7	9
19	(United States) Richard Antinucci	10	7	8	14	DSQ	14	9	14													3
20	(Netherlands) Ross Zwolsman	7	15	13	Ret	10	18	12	9													2
21	(Spain) Alejandro Núñez	Ret	18	9	DSQ	9	10	10	8	10	Ret	12	16	13	14	9	15†	14	18	Ret	11	1
22	(Germany) Thomas Holzer	11	Ret	18	13	DSQ	16	Ret	14	16	20	13	17	19	15	11	13	11	16	Ret	15	0
23	(Czech Republic) Filip Salaquarda	Ret	Ret	17	Ret	11	Ret	19†	13	14	19	14	15	22	19†	13	14	19	17	11	16	0
guest drivers ineligible for championship points
	(Belgium) Nico Verdonck									13	16	10	14									0
	(United Kingdom) Danny Watts													15	Ret							0
	(United Kingdom) Stephen Jelley													20	16							0
	(Germany) Julia Kuhn													21	18					DNQ	DNQ	0
	(United Kingdom) Rob Austin															12	Ret	21	Ret			0
	(Italy) Paolo Montin																	15	Ret			0
	(United Kingdom) Ben Clucas																			Ret	14	0
Pos	Driver	HOC1 (Germany)		PAU (France)		SPA (Belgium)		MON (Monaco)		OSC (Germany)		NOR (Germany)		NÜR (Germany)		ZAN (Netherlands)		LAU (Germany)		HOC2 (Germany)		Pts

Colour	Result
Gold	Winner
Silver	Second place
Bronze	Third place
Green	Points classification
Blue	Non-points classification
Blue	Non-classified finish (NC)
Purple	Retired, not classified (Ret)
Red	Did not qualify (DNQ)
Red	Did not pre-qualify (DNPQ)
Black	Disqualified (DSQ)
White	Did not start (DNS)
White	Withdrew (WD)
White	Race cancelled (C)
Blank	Did not practice (DNP)
Blank	Did not arrive (DNA)
Blank	Excluded (EX)

**Bold** – Pole
Italics – Fastest Lap

† — Drivers did not finish the race, but were classified as they completed over 90% of the race distance.

=== Rookie Cup ===
Rookie drivers are only eligible for the Rookie Cup title if they have not previously competed in a national or international Formula 3 championship.

Pos	Driver	HOC1 (Germany)		PAU (France)		SPA (Belgium)		MON (Monaco)		OSC (Germany)		NOR (Germany)		NÜR (Germany)		ZAN (Netherlands)		LAU (Germany)		HOC2 (Germany)		Pts
1	(Germany) Sebastian Vettel	15	5	7	11	DSQ	13	18	17	5	5	2	4	11	2	2	2	3	15	13	3	157
2	(Argentina) Esteban Guerrieri	Ret	6	19	9	7	15	17	10	11	7	11	9	14	12	6	12	16	10	7	17	132
3	(France) Guillaume Moreau	9	10	4	8	3	Ret	Ret	Ret	7	11	8	11	16	8	1	4	6	4	Ret	2	128
4	(Brazil) Átila Abreu	8	9	11	12	DSQ	12	Ret	11	8	10	9	10	7	17	5	8	7	12	8	Ret	116
Pos	Driver	HOC1 (Germany)		PAU (France)		SPA (Belgium)		MON (Monaco)		OSC (Germany)		NOR (Germany)		NÜR (Germany)		ZAN (Netherlands)		LAU (Germany)		HOC2 (Germany)		Pts

=== Team Standings ===
Pos	Team	Points
1	(France) ASM Formule 3	261
2	(France) Signature-Plus	103
3	(Italy) Prema Powerteam	98
4	(United Kingdom) Manor Motorsport	95
5	(Germany) ASL Mücke Motorsport	75
6	(France) Signature	62
7	(Germany) Team Rosberg	51
8	(Austria) HBR Motorsport	17
9	(Luxembourg) Team Midland Euroseries	15
10	(Netherlands) Ross Zwolsman	2

=== Nations Cup ===
	Nation	Points
1	Great Britain	237
2	Germany	170
3	France	161
4	Brazil	94
5	Netherlands	36
6	Italy	22
7	Japan	18
8	Argentina	14
9	Austria	11
10	Belgium	11
11	United States	4
12	Spain	2
