= Marco Bonanomi =

Italian professional racing driver

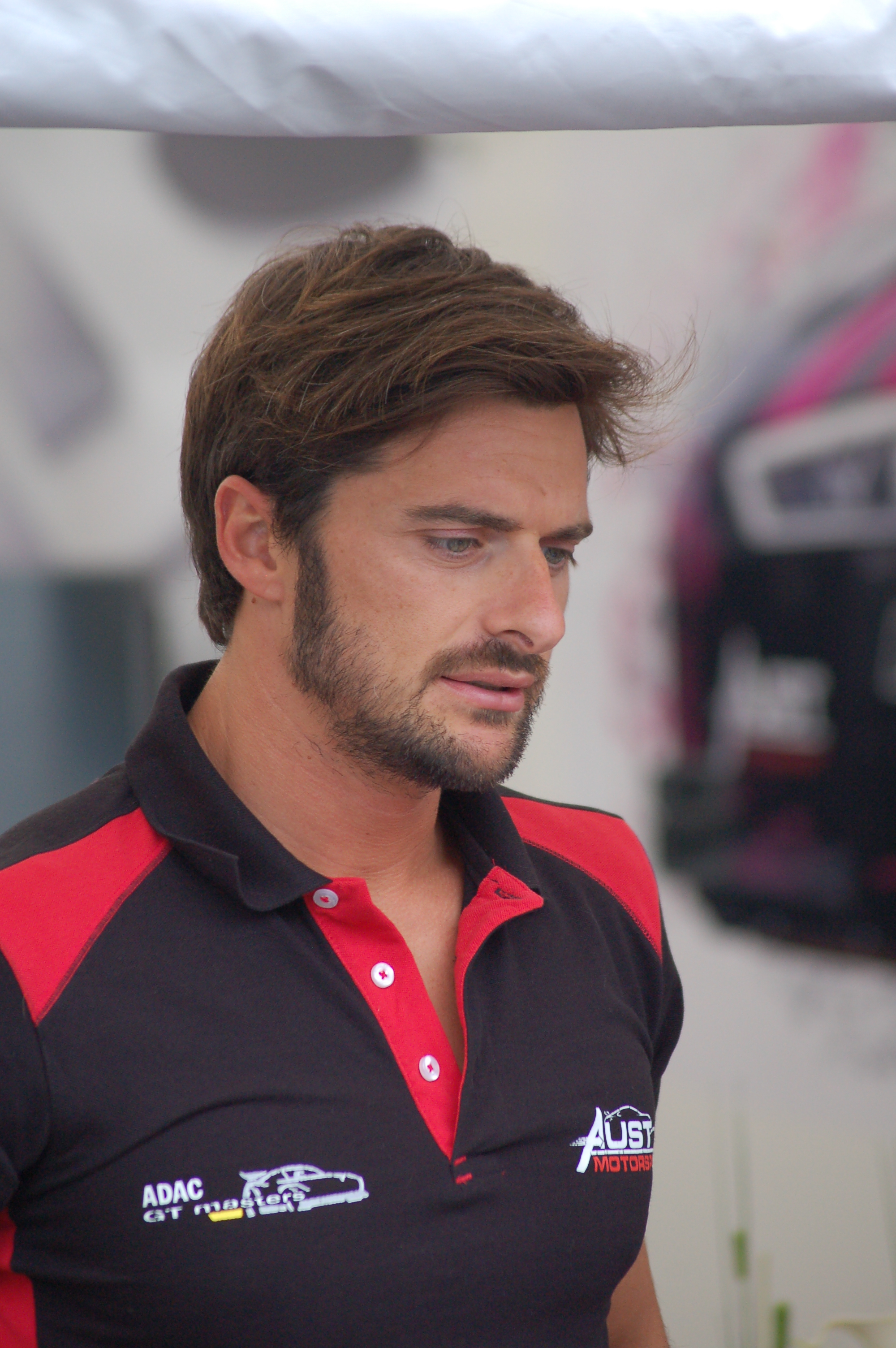
- Bonanomi in 2016
- Nationality: Italian
- Born: Marco Erminio Bonanomi; 12 March 1985 (age 41) Lecco, Italy

FIA World Endurance Championship career
- Debut season: 2014
- Current team: ByKolles Racing Team
- Categorisation: FIA Platinum (until 2017); FIA Gold (2018–2025); FIA Silver (2026–)
- Car number: 4
- Former teams: Audi Sport Team Joest
- Starts: 6
- Wins: 0
- Poles: 0
- Fastest laps: 0

Previous series
- 2010–11 2008–09 2007 2006, 2009 2006–08 2004–05 2003–04 2001–02 2001–02: Italian GT Championship; GP2 Asia Series; International Formula Master; Euroseries 3000; Formula Renault 3.5 Series; Formula 3 Euro Series; Italian F3; Eurocup Formula Renault 2.0; Formula Renault 2.0 Italia

Championship titles
- 2011 2004, 2005: Italian GT Championship GT3; Bologna Motorshow F3000 Sprint

24 Hours of Le Mans career
- Years: 2012, 2014-
- Teams: Audi Sport North America
- Best finish: 3rd (2012)
- Class wins: 0

Marco Erminio Bonanomi (born 12 March 1985 in Lecco) is an Italian professional racing driver.

== Career ==
=== Formula Renault ===
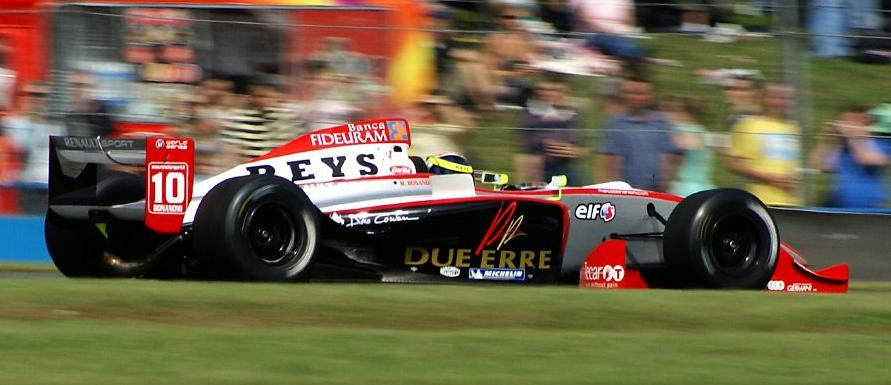
Bonanomi driving for RC Motorsport in the Donington Park round of the 2007 World Series by Renault season.

Bonanomi began his car racing career in 2001 by competing in a few rounds of the Formula Renault Eurocup and Italian Formula Renault championships with the Cram Competition team. He took part in the same series in 2002, but moved to the RP Motorsport team.

Four years later, Bonanomi drove in four races of the 2006 Formula Renault 3.5 Series season for Tech 1 Racing, starting his current career trend. He completed a full season in the formula in 2007, finishing 12th in the Drivers' Championship for the RC Motorsport team. In 2008, he drove in the series again, this time for the Comtec team. He survived a horrendous crash at the season finale at the Circuit de Catalunya. Running behind Mikhail Aleshin on the front straight, Bonanomi jinked out to make a pass but touched wheels with the Russian which launched him into the air and after hitting the bottom of the scoring tower, his car landed upside down on the grass beside the pit exit. He was unhurt, but his car was unrepairable, thus meaning his season was over.

=== Formula Three ===
From 2003 to 2005 Bonanomi focussed on Formula Three competing in the Italian championship and the Euro Series, as well as a number of one-off races. During this period he drove for the former Formula One team, Coloni, and another run by retired F1 driver and compatriot Piercarlo Ghinzani.

=== Formula 3000 ===
For 2006, Bonanomi drove in the Euroseries 3000 for the Fisichella Motor Sport team. He finished runner-up in the Drivers' Championship with six pole positions and wins from eighteen starts; his most successful stint yet in motorsport.

=== Formula Master ===
In addition to a full World Series by Renault campaign in 2007, Bonanomi also competed in selected rounds of the inaugural International Formula Master series, achieving in final placing of fifteenth in the Drivers' Championship.

=== GP2 Series ===
In the early part of 2008, Bonanomi drove in another new motorsport championship: the GP2 Asia Series. Driving for the Minardi Piquet Sports team, he won the final race of the season in Dubai, the most prestigious win of his racing career so far. He returned to the GP2 Asia Series in the 2008–09 championship, replacing Alex Yoong at Qi-Meritus Mahara from the January Bahrain meeting onwards. This was due to Yoong lacking sufficient time for racing.

=== WEC Hypercar ===
In 2023, Bonanomi worked as a test & development driver on the Tipo 6 Isotta Frashini Italian LMH Hypercar alongside French driver Jean-Karl Vernay. British team Vector plans to enter the car in 2024 in WEC.

== Racing record ==
=== Career summary ===
Season	Series	Team	Races	Wins	Poles	F/Laps	Podiums	Points	Position
2001	Formula Renault 2000 Eurocup	Cram Competition	3	0	0	0	0	0	43rd
2001	Formula Renault 2000 Italia	Cram Competition	1	0	0	0	0	0	NC
2002	Formula Renault 2000 Eurocup	RP Motorsport	3	0	0	0	0	0	NC
2002	Formula Renault 2000 Italia	RP Motorsport	10	0	0	0	0	22	15th
2003	Italian Formula 3 Championship	Coloni Motorsport	9	1	1	1	4	77	4th
2003	Korea Super Prix	Target Racing	1	0	0	0	0	—N/a	16th
2003	Macau Grand Prix	Target Racing	1	0	0	0	0	—N/a	20th
2004	Formula 3 Euro Series	Team Ghinzani	20	0	0	0	0	0	25th
2004	Masters of Formula 3	Team Ghinzani	0	0	0	0	0	—N/a	DNQ
2004	Italian Formula 3 Championship	Team Ghinzani	2	2	2	0	2	86	6th
2004	Italian Formula 3 Championship	Corbetta Angelo	4	1	0	0	1	86	6th
2005	Formula 3 Euro Series	Prema Powerteam	19	0	0	0	1	21	11th
2005	Masters of Formula 3	Prema Powerteam	1	0	0	0	0	—N/a	18th
2006	Euroseries 3000	FMS International	18	6	6	5	8	94	**2nd**
2006	Formula Renault 3.5 Series	Tech 1 Racing	4	0	0	0	0	5	31st
2007	Formula Renault 3.5 Series	RC Motorsport	16	0	0	1	2	44	13th
2007	International Formula Master	Euronova Racing	6	0	1	0	0	11	15th
2008	GP2 Asia Series	Piquet Sports	10	1	0	0	1	9	12th
2008	Formula Renault 3.5 Series	Red Devil Comtec Racing	16	0	1	0	1	56	11th
2008–09	GP2 Asia Series	My Team Qi-Meritus Mahara	8	0	0	0	0	0	22nd
2009	Euroseries 3000	Bull Racing	4	1	1	0	2	71	**2nd**
2009	Euroseries 3000	Coloni Motorsport	9	3	2	3	5	71	**2nd**
2010	Italian GT Championship - GT3	Audi Sport Italia	14	2	0	1	9	144	**2nd**
2011	Italian GT Championship - GT3	Audi Sport Italia	14	4	1	2	13	191	**1st**
2012	Blancpain Endurance Series - Pro	Belgian Audi Club WRT	5	0	0	0	1	41	12th
2012	24 Hours of Le Mans - LMP1	Audi Sport North America	1	0	0	0	1	—N/a	**3rd**
2014	Blancpain Endurance Series - Pro-Am	Pro GT by Alméras	1	0	0	0	0	14	19th
2014	United SportsCar Championship - GTD	Fall-Line Motorsports	1	0	0	0	0	22	77th
2014	FIA World Endurance Championship	Audi Sport Team Joest	2	0	0	0	0	8	22nd
2014	24 Hours of Le Mans - LMP1	Audi Sport Team Joest	1	0	0	0	0	—N/a	DNF
2015	Blancpain Endurance Series	ISR	5	0	0	0	0	18	15th
2015	Blancpain Sprint Series	ISR	14	0	0	0	0	26	15th
2015	FIA World Endurance Championship	Audi Sport Team Joest	2	0	0	0	0	24	12th
2015	24 Hours of Le Mans - LMP1	Audi Sport Team Joest	1	0	0	0	0	—N/a	7th
2015	Audi Sport TT Cup	Audi Sport	2	1	0	1	1	—N/a	NC†
2016	ADAC GT Masters	Aust Motorsport	12	0	0	0	0	0	NC
2016	Blancpain GT Series Sprint Cup	Saintéloc Racing	1	0	0	0	0	0	NC
2016	Formula V8 3.5 Series	RP Motorsport	2	0	0	0	0	3	18th
2016	Australian GT Championship	JAMEC PEM Racing	2	0	1	0	0	82	NC
2016	Australian GT Championship	GT Motorsport	2	0	0	0	0	82	NC
2016	Australian Endurance Championship	GT Motorsport	1	0	0	0	0	0	NC
2017	FIA World Endurance Championship	ByKolles Racing Team	2	0	0	0	0	0.5	36th
2017	24 Hours of Le Mans - LMP1	ByKolles Racing Team	1	0	0	0	0	—N/a	DNF
2017	FRD LMP3 Series	Craft-Bamboo Racing	2	0	0	0	0	17	20th
2017	IMSA SportsCar Championship - Prototype	PR1/Mathiasen Motorsports	1	0	0	0	0	22	37th
2019	Intercontinental GT Challenge	Honda Team Motul	2	0	0	0	0	0	NC
2020	Italian GT Championship - Sprint (GT3)	Nova Race	2	0	0	0	0	1	25th
2021	International GT Open - Pro	Reno Racing	2	0	0	0	1	18	12th
2024	Italian GT Endurance Championship - GT Cup Pro-Am Division 1	Formula Racing	1	1	0	0	0	—N/a	NC†
2026	Le Mans Cup - GT3	AF Corse	6	0	0	0	1	59	9th
2026	International GT Open	AF Corse	3	0	0	0	0	0	72nd

† As Bonanomi was a guest driver, he was ineligible to score championship points.
^{*} Season still in progress.

=== Complete Formula 3 Euro Series results ===
(key) (Races in bold indicate pole position) (Races in italics indicate fastest lap)

Year	Entrant	Chassis	Engine	1	2	3	4	5	6	7	8	9	10	11	12	13	14	15	16	17	18	19	20	DC	Points
2004	Team Ghinzani	Dallara F302/052	Mugen-Honda	HOC; 1 Ret	HOC; 2; 24	EST; 1; 14	EST; 2; 17	ADR; 1 DSQ	ADR; 1; 12	PAU; 1 Ret	PAU; 2; 11	NOR; 1; 14	NOR; 1 Ret	MAG; 1 Ret	MAG; 2; 17	NÜR; 1; 18	NÜR; 2; 17	ZAN; 1; 12	ZAN; 2; 17	BRN; 1 Ret	BRN; 2; 19	HOC; 1; 16	HOC; 2 Ret	25th	0
2005	Prema Powerteam	Dallara F305/026	Opel	HOC; 1; 3	HOC; 2; 14	PAU; 1 Ret	PAU; 2; 10	SPA; 1 DNS	SPA; 2; 19	MON; 1; 13	MON; 2; 16	OSC; 1; 12	OSC; 2; 17	NOR; 1; 6	NOR; 2 Ret	NÜR; 1; 9	NÜR; 2; 4	ZAN; 1; 8	ZAN; 2; 9	LAU; 1; 10	LAU; 2; 13	HOC; 3; 6	HOC; 4; 6	11th	21

=== Complete Formula V8 3.5 Series results ===
(key) (Races in bold indicate pole position) (Races in italics indicate fastest lap)

Year	Team	1	2	3	4	5	6	7	8	9	10	11	12	13	14	15	16	17	18	Pos	Points
2006	Tech 1 Racing	ZOL; 1	ZOL; 2	MON; 1	IST; 1	IST; 2	MIS; 1	MIS; 2	SPA; 1 Ret	SPA; 2; 8	NÜR; 1; 9	NÜR; 2 Ret	DON; 1	DON; 2	LMS; 1	LMS; 2	CAT; 1	CAT; 2		31st	5
2007	RC Motorsport	MNZ; 1; 3	MNZ; 2; 18	NÜR; 1; 6	NÜR; 2 Ret	MON; 1; 10	HUN; 1 DNQ	HUN; 2 Ret	SPA; 1; 9	SPA; 2 Ret	DON; 1; 7	DON; 2; 3	MAG; 1 Ret	MAG; 2; 23	EST; 1; 11	EST; 2; 8	CAT; 1; 20	CAT; 2 Ret		13th	44
2008	Comtec Racing	MNZ; 1 Ret	MNZ; 2 DSQ	SPA; 1; 4	**SPA**; **2**; 2	MON; 1; 13	SIL; 1; 8	SIL; 2; 9	HUN; 1; 5	HUN; 2; 13	NÜR; 1 Ret	NÜR; 2; 4	BUG; 1; 5	BUG; 2; 11	EST; 1 Ret	EST; 2; 5	CAT; 1 Ret	CAT; 2 DNS		11th	56
2016	RP Motorsport	ALC; 1	ALC; 2	HUN; 1	HUN; 2	SPA; 1	SPA; 2	LEC; 1	LEC; 2	SIL; 1	SIL; 2	RBR; 1; 9	RBR; 2; 10	MNZ; 1	MNZ; 2	JER; 1	JER; 2	CAT; 1	CAT; 2	18th	3

=== Complete GP2 Series results ===
==== Complete GP2 Asia Series results ====
(key) (Races in bold indicate pole position) (Races in italics indicate fastest lap)

Year	Entrant	1	2	3	4	5	6	7	8	9	10	11	12	DC	Points
2008	Piquet Sports	UAE; FEA; 20	UAE; SPR; 13	IND; FEA; Ret	IND; SPR; 8	MAL; FEA; Ret	MAL; SPR; 15	BHR; FEA; Ret	BHR; SPR; Ret	UAE; FEA; 6	UAE; SPR; 1			12th	9
2008–09	Qi-Meritus Mahara	CHN; FEA	CHN; SPR	UAE; FEA	UAE; SPR	BHR; FEA; 20	BHR; SPR; 10	QAT; FEA; 16	QAT; SPR; 11	MAL; FEA; Ret	MAL; SPR; 14	BHR; FEA; 14	BHR; SPR; 8	22nd	0

=== 24 Hours of Le Mans results ===
Year	Team	Co-Drivers	Car	Class	Laps	Pos.	Class Pos.
2012	(Germany) Audi Sport North America	(United Kingdom) Oliver Jarvis (Germany) Mike Rockenfeller	Audi R18 ultra	LMP1	375	**3rd**	**3rd**
2014	(Germany) Audi Sport Team Joest	(Portugal) Filipe Albuquerque (United Kingdom) Oliver Jarvis	Audi R18 e-tron quattro	LMP1-H	25	DNF	DNF
2015	(Germany) Audi Sport Team Joest	(Portugal) Filipe Albuquerque (Germany) René Rast	Audi R18 e-tron quattro	LMP1	387	7th	7th
2017	(Austria) ByKolles Racing Team	(United Kingdom) Oliver Webb (Austria) Dominik Kraihamer	ENSO CLM P1/01-Nismo	LMP1	7	DNF	DNF

=== Complete FIA World Endurance Championship results ===
Year	Entrant	Class	Chassis	Engine	1	2	3	4	5	6	7	8	9	Rank	Points
2014	Audi Sport Team Joest	LMP1	Audi R18 e-tron quattro	Audi TDI 4.0 L Turbo V6 (Hybrid Diesel)	SIL	SPA; 6	LMS; Ret	COA	FUJ	SHA	BHR	SÃO		22nd	8
2015	Audi Sport Team Joest	LMP1	Audi R18 e-tron quattro	Audi TDI 4.0 L Turbo V6 (Hybrid Diesel)	SIL	SPA; 4	LMS; 7	NÜR	COA	FUJ	SHA	BHR		12th	24
2017	ByKolles Racing Team	LMP1	ENSO CLM P1/01	Nismo VRX30A 3.0 Turbo V6	SIL	SPA	LMS; Ret	NÜR; 14	MEX	COA	FUJ	SHA	BHR	36th	0.5

=== Complete Blancpain Sprint Series results ===
Year	Team	Car	Class	1	2	3	4	5	6	7	8	9	10	11	12	13	14	Pos.	Points
2015	ISR	Audi R8 LMS ultra	Pro	NOG; QR; 6	NOG; CR; 7	BRH; QR; 12	BRH; CR; 11	ZOL; QR; 10	ZOL; CR; 7	MOS; QR; 14	MOS; CR; Ret	ALG; QR; 9	ALG; CR; 11	MIS; QR; 13	MIS; CR; 10	ZAN; QR; 11	ZAN; CR; 4	16th	26
2016	Saintéloc Racing	Audi R8 LMS	Pro	MIS; QR	MIS; CR	BRH; QR	BRH; CR	NÜR; QR	NÜR; CR	HUN; QR	HUN; CR	CAT; QR; Ret	CAT; CR; DNS					NC	0

=== Complete Le Mans Cup results ===
(key) (Races in bold indicate pole position; races in italics indicate fastest lap)

Year	Entrant	Car	Class	1	2	3	4	5	6	Pos.	Points
2026	AF Corse	Ferrari 296 GT3 Evo	GT3	BAR; 4	LEC; 8	LMS; 5	SPA; 5	SIL; Ret	POR; 3	9th	59

^{*} Season still in progress.
