= Guillaume Moreau =

French racing driver (born 1983)

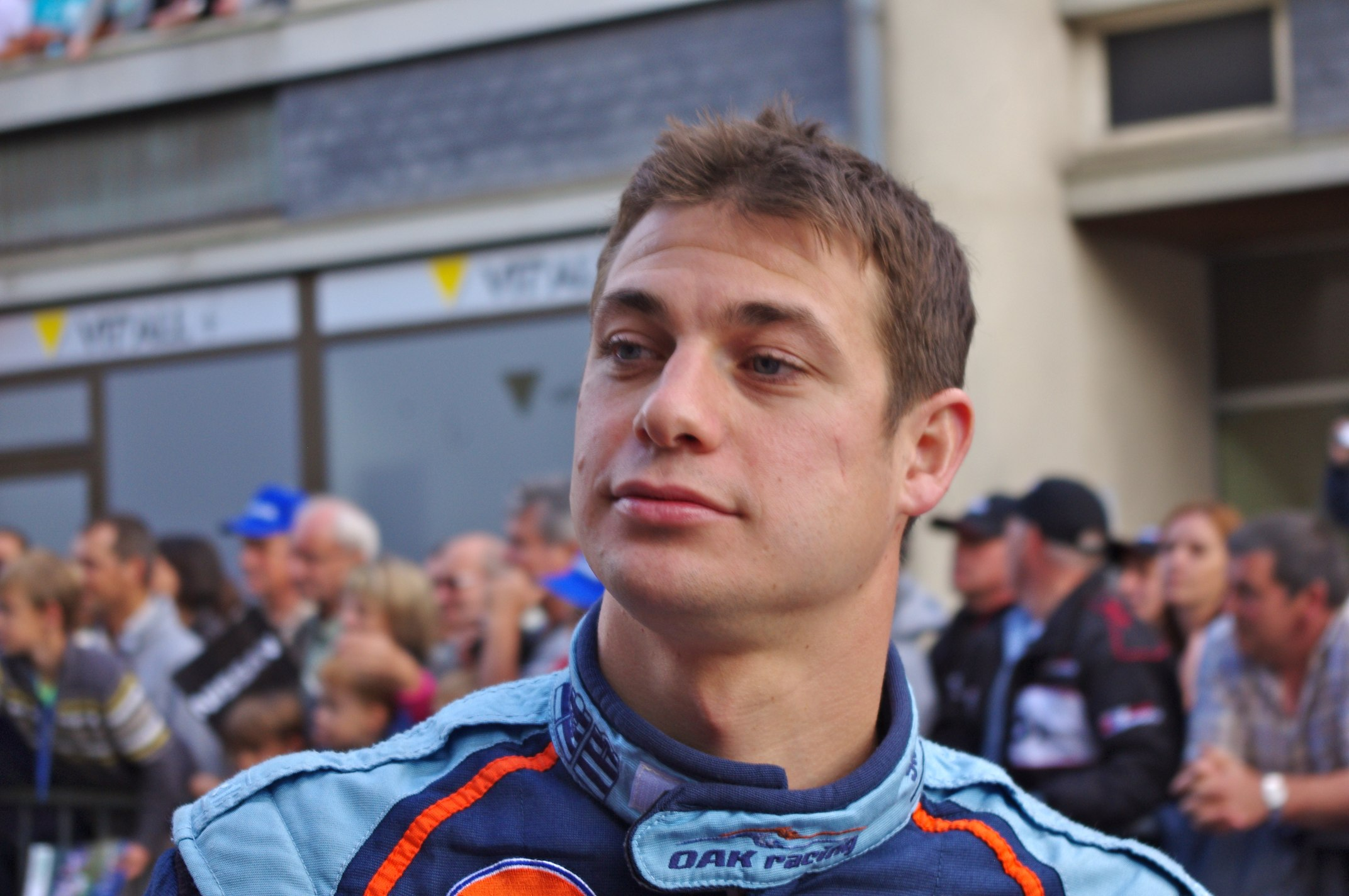
- Moreau at the 2011 24 Hours of Le Mans driver parade
- Nationality: (France) French
- Born: Guillaume Alexandre Moreau; 8 March 1983 (age 43) Limoges (France)
- Categorisation: FIA Gold (until 2014); FIA Bronze (2015–2019)

Previous series
- 2002–03 2002–04 2003 2004 2005–06 2006 2007–08 2009 2007–2009: Formula Renault 1.6 France; Formula Renault 2.0 Eurocup; FR2.0 Netherlands; Formula Renault 2.0 France; F3 Euroseries; British F3; Le Mans Series; FIA GT Championship; FRenault 3.5 Series

24 Hours of Le Mans career
- Years: 2007–2011
- Teams: Courage Compétition, Luc Alphand Aventures, OAK Racing
- Best finish: 7th (2010)

Guillaume Alexandre Moreau (born 8 March 1983 in Limoges, France) is a French former racing driver who competed in the Le Mans Series.

After beginning his career in single-seaters, Moreau switched to sports car racing. In 2008, Moreau shared the GT1 class championship with teammate Patrice Goueslard in the Le Mans Series driving a Luc Alphand Corvette. He competed in five consecutive editions of the 24 Hours of Le Mans race, from 2007 until 2011, with a best result of seventh overall and second in class in the 2010 event. He was also scheduled to drive in the 2012 race, but withdrew after crashing heavily during the test day preceding the event, sustaining damage to his twelfth vertebra and compressing his spinal cord. After successful surgery, he began recuperating from his injuries. By 2014, Moreau had regained the ability to walk, and even returned to the seat of a race car with two private tests. Despite this, he chose to end his racing career, later taking over his father's company "Sa Scierie du Limousin" after he himself had been involved in a serious motorcycle accident.

Moreau now reportedly manages the insurance of around 100 racing drivers.

== Racing record ==
=== Complete Formula Renault 3.5 Series results ===
(key) (Races in bold indicate pole position) (Races in italics indicate fastest lap)

| Year | Team | 1 | 2 | 3 | 4 | 5 | 6 | 7 | 8 | 9 | 10 | 11 | 12 | 13 | 14 | 15 | 16 | 17 | Pos | Points |
|---|---|---|---|---|---|---|---|---|---|---|---|---|---|---|---|---|---|---|---|---|
| 2007 | KTR | MNZ; 1 Ret | MNZ; 2 Ret | NÜR; 1; 9 | NÜR; 2; 4 | MON; 1; 9 | **HUN**; **1**; 17 | HUN; 2; 9 | SPA; 1 Ret | SPA; 2 Ret | DON; 1; 8 | DON; 2; 2 | MAG; 1; 10 | **MAG**; **2**; 1 | EST; 1; 23 | EST; 2; 12 | CAT; 1 Ret | CAT; 2 Ret | 14th | 43 |
| 2008 | KTR | MNZ; 1; 8 | MNZ; 2; 6 | SPA; 1; 3 | SPA; 2; 14 | MON; 1; 7 | SIL; 1; 13 | SIL; 2; 11 | HUN; 1 Ret | HUN; 2 Ret | NÜR; 1 | NÜR; 2 | LMS; 1 | LMS; 2 | EST; 1 | EST; 2 | CAT; 1 | CAT; 2 | 16th | 20 |
| 2009 | KMP Group/SG Formula | CAT; 1 | CAT; 2 | SPA; 1 | SPA; 2 | MON; 1 | HUN; 1 | HUN; 2 | SIL; 1; 16 | SIL; 2; 12 | BUG; 1; 13 | BUG; 2; 12 | ALG; 1; 5 | ALG; 2; 3 | NÜR; 1; 11 | NÜR; 2 Ret | ALC; 1; 19 | ALC; 2; 18 | 18th | 18 |

=== 24 Hours of Le Mans results ===
| Year | Team | Co-Drivers | Car | Class | Laps | Pos. | Class Pos. |
|---|---|---|---|---|---|---|---|
| 2007 | (France) Courage Compétition | (France) Jean-Marc Gounon (Sweden) Stefan Johansson | Courage LC70-AER | LMP1 | 175 | DNF | DNF |
| 2008 | (France) Luc Alphand Aventures | (France) Luc Alphand (France) Jérôme Policand | Chevrolet Corvette C6.R | GT1 | 335 | 17th | 5th |
| 2009 | OAK Racing; Team Mazda France | (France) Matthieu Lahaye (Switzerland) Karim Ajlani | Pescarolo 01-Mazda | LMP2 | 208 | DNF | DNF |
| 2010 | (France) OAK Racing | (France) Matthieu Lahaye (Czech Republic) Jan Charouz | Pescarolo 01-Judd | LMP2 | 361 | 7th | **2nd** |
| 2011 | (France) OAK Racing | (France) Pierre Ragues (Portugal) Tiago Monteiro | OAK Pescarolo 01 Evo-Judd | LMP1 | 80 | DNF | DNF |
