= Vladimir Atoev =

Russian racing driver

- Nationality: (Russia) Russian
- Born: 22 January 1999 (age 27) Rostov-on-Don, Russia

Formula V8 3.5 career
- Debut season: 2016
- Current team: SMP Racing
- Categorisation: FIA Silver
- Car number: 24

Previous series
- 2015 2014: SMP F4 Championship; French F4 Championship

Vladimir Atoev (born 22 January 1999) is a Russian racing driver. He currently competes in the Russian Circuit Racing Series for G-Drive SMP Racing.

== Career ==
=== Karting ===
Prior to his single-seater career, Atoev enjoyed a successful period in karting, winning the Russian Karting Championship Supermini class in 2009 and finishing second in the KF3 class two years later. Outside of his native Russia, he finished sixth in the KF3 WSK Final Cup in 2012.

=== Formula 4 ===
Atoev made his single-seater debut in 2014, racing in the French F4 Championship. He finished the season in eleventh place, with a best race result of fourth achieved at both Nogaro and Paul Ricard. He did take victory in the second race of the Nogaro event, but was penalised with a 30-second time penalty for a collision with Belgian driver Max Defourny.

For 2015, Atoev raced in the inaugural SMP F4 Championship. He finished as runner-up in the championship, behind Finnish driver Niko Kari, taking eleven podium positions including three race wins, all of which occurred at the Alastaro Circuit in Finland.

=== Formula V8 3.5 ===
In 2016, Atoev was set graduate to Formula V8 3.5, racing for the SMP Racing team alongside Matthieu Vaxivière, the championship runner-up from the 2015 Formula Renault 3.5 Series, but was forced to withdraw due to a back injury and was replaced by Matevos Isaakyan.

== Racing record ==
=== Career summary ===
Season	Series	Team	Races	Wins	Poles	F/Laps	Podiums	Points	Position
2014	French F4 Championship	Auto Sport Academy	21	0	0	1	0	71	11th
2015	SMP F4 Championship	Koiranen GP	21	3	4	5	11	296	**2nd**
2016	Euroformula Open Championship	Teo Martín Motorsport	6	0	0	0	0	3	20th
2016	Ferrari Challenge Europe - Trofeo Pirelli (Pro-Am)	Motor Service	6	2	2	2	4	76	5th
2017	Russian Circuit Racing Series - Touring Light	SMP Power	12	3	0	0	5	142	7th
2017	Russian Circuit Racing Series - Touring Light	SMP Racing Russia	2	0	1	0	0	142	7th
2018	Blancpain GT Series Sprint Cup	SMP Racing by AKKA ASP	10	0	0	0	0	4	22nd
2018	Blancpain GT Series Sprint Cup - Silver Cup	SMP Racing by AKKA ASP	10	0	0	1	6	80.5	**2nd**
2023	Russian Circuit Racing Series - Touring	Lukoil Racing Team	14	1	1	1	6	240	4th
2024	Russian Circuit Racing Series - Touring	Lukoil Racing SMP Team	14	4	2	1	7	269	**2nd**
2025	Russian Circuit Racing Series - Touring	G-Drive SMP Racing	14	0	0	1	2	178	7th
2026	Russian Circuit Racing Series - Touring	SMP Racing	14	1	0	1	2	188	7th

=== Complete French F4 Championship results ===
(key) (Races in bold indicate pole position) (Races in italics indicate points for the fastest lap of top ten finishers)

Year	1	2	3	4	5	6	7	8	9	10	11	12	13	14	15	16	17	18	19	20	21	Rank	Points
2014	LMS; 1; 5	LMS; 2; 9	LMS; 3; 20	PAU; 1 Ret	PAU; 2; 11	PAU; 3; 6	VDV; 1; 11	VDV; 2; 7	VDV; 3; 8	MAG; 1; 8	MAG; 2; 12	MAG; 3; 18	NOG; 1; 8	NOG; 2; 19	NOG; 3; 4	JER; 1; 15	JER; 2; 11	JER; 3; 9	LEC; 1; 9	LEC; 2; 4	LEC; 3; 10	11th	71

=== Complete SMP F4 Championship results ===
(key) (Races in bold indicate pole position) (Races in italics indicate fastest lap)

Year	1	2	3	4	5	6	7	8	9	10	11	12	13	14	15	16	17	18	19	20	21	DC	Points
2015	**AHV**; **1**; 3	AHV; 2; 2	**AHV**; **3**; 4	MSC1; 1; 3	MSC1; 2; 5	MSC1; 3; 8	SOC; 1; 3	SOC; 2; 3	SOC; 3; 8	**ALA**; **1**; 1	ALA; 2; 1	**ALA**; **3**; 1	AUD1; 1; 5	AUD1; 2; 3	AUD1; 3; 2	MSC2; 1; 10	MSC2; 2; 5	MSC2; 3; 10	AUD2; 1; 4	AUD2; 2; 3	AUD2; 3; 5	2nd	296

=== Complete Blancpain GT Series Sprint Cup results ===
Year	Team	Car	Class	1	2	3	4	5	6	7	8	9	10	Pos.	Points
2018	SMP Racing by AKKA ASP	Mercedes-AMG GT3	Silver	ZOL; 1; 16	ZOL; 2; 8	BRH; 1; 18	BRH; 2 Ret	MIS; 1; 12	MIS; 2; 17	HUN; 1; 8	HUN; 2; 18	NÜR; 1; 14	NÜR; 2; 11	2nd	80.5
