= 2025 4 Hours of Dubai =

Endurance sportscar racing event

The Grand Prix layout of the Dubai Autodrome

The 2025 4 Hours of Dubai was an endurance sportscar racing event, held between 7 and 9 February 2025 at Dubai Autodrome in Dubai, United Arab Emirates. It was the third and fourth round of the 2024–25 Asian Le Mans Series season.

== Entry list ==
The initial entry list was published on 24 January and consisted of 47 entries across 3 categories – 10 in LMP2, 7 in LMP3, and 30 in GT. A revised entry list was published on 30 January, which saw the removal of the No. 90 Blackthorn Aston Martin entry. This reduced the number of GT entries from 30 to 29 and the total number of entries from 47 to 46.

Compared to the previous round at Sepang, Julien Andlauer replaced Louis Delétraz in the No. 91 Pure Rxcing Oreca in the LMP2 class. In LMP3, Chris Short took over from James Dayson in the No. 15 RLR MSport Ligier, while Griffin Peebles replaced Dan Skočodople in the No. 26 Bretton Racing Ligier. The No. 35 Ultimate Ligier saw Leonardo Colavita and Louis Stern join the team, replacing Stéphane Lémeret and Bence Válint. Additionally, Thomas Kiefer took the place of Seth Lucas in the No. 49 High Class Racing Ligier.

In the GT category, Dragon Racing fielded two Ferrari 296 GT3 entries. Todd Coleman, Lorcan Hanafin, and Aaron Telitz drove the No. 08 Ferrari, while Giacomo Altoè, Nicola Marinangeli, and Marco Pulcini competed in the No. 88 Ferrari. Luca Stolz replaced Jules Gounon in the No. 81 Winward Racing Mercedes, and the No. 19 Blackthorn Aston Martin introduced a new driver line-up featuring Jonathan Adam, Charles Bateman, and Reema Juffali. Marvin Kirchhöfer took over from Tom Gamble in the No. 77 Optimum Motorsport McLaren, while Takeshi Kimura and Casper Stevenson replaced Esteban Masson and Yudai Uchida in the No. 57 Car Guy Racing Ferrari.

Herberth Motorsport entered the grid with two Porsche 911 GT3 R (992) cars. The No. 46 QMMF by Herberth Porsche was driven by Qatari trio Ibrahim Al-Abdulghani, Abdulla Ali Al-Khelaifi, and Ghanim Ali Al Maadheed, while the No. 99 Herberth Motorsport Porsche was shared by Ralf Bohn and Alfred and Robert Renauer. Lastly, Earl Bamber Motorsport introduced a new driver line-up, with Jamie Day, Mattia Drudi, and Gabriel Rindone replacing Brendon Leitch, Marco Sørensen, and Anderson Tanoto.

After a crash during private testing on 6 February, the No. 21 Car Collection Motorsport was withdrawn from the event, reducing the amount of entries to 45 cars.

== Schedule ==
Date	Time (local: GST)	Event
Friday, 7 February	11:15	Free Practice 1
Friday, 7 February	16:45	Free Practice 2
Saturday, 8 February	9:40	Qualifying – GT
Saturday, 8 February	10:05	Qualifying – LMP2 and LMP3
Saturday, 8 February	14:10	Race 1
Sunday, 9 February	10:00	Warm-up
Sunday, 9 February	14:10	Race 2

== Free practice ==
- Only the fastest car in each class is shown.

Free Practice 1	Class	No.	Entrant	Driver	Time
Free Practice 1	LMP2	20	(Portugal) Algarve Pro Racing	(United Kingdom) Alex Quinn	1:47.199
Free Practice 1	LMP3	15	(United Kingdom) RLR MSport	(Mexico) Ian Aguilera	1:55.367
Free Practice 1	GT	14	(China) Climax Racing	(Austria) Lucas Auer	1:58.789
Free Practice 2	Class	No.	Entrant	Driver	Time
Free Practice 2	LMP2	91	(Lithuania) Pure Rxcing	(France) Julien Andlauer	1:48.790
Free Practice 2	LMP3	26	(Czech Republic) Bretton Racing	(Australia) Griffin Peebles	1:55.387
Free Practice 2	GT	92	(Germany) Manthey EMA	(Italy) Riccardo Pera	1:59.033

== Race 1 ==
=== Qualifying results ===
Pole position winners in each class are marked in bold.

Pos	Class	No.	Team	Driver	Time	Gap	Grid
1	**LMP2**	**22**	**(Germany) Proton Competition**	**(Italy) Giorgio Roda**	**1:47.569**	—	1
2	LMP2	50	(Italy) AF Corse	(United States) Jeremy Clarke	1:48.154	+0.585	2
3	LMP2	91	(Lithuania) Pure Rxcing	(Saint Kitts and Nevis) Alex Malykhin	1:48.398	+0.829	3
4	LMP2	11	(Germany) Proton Competition	(Germany) Alexander Mattschull	1:48.878	+1.309	4
5	LMP2	83	(Italy) AF Corse	(France) François Perrodo	1:49.189	+1.620	5
6	LMP2	3	(Luxembourg) DKR Engineering	(Greece) Georgios Kolovos	1:49.317	+1.748	6
7	LMP2	24	(United Kingdom) Nielsen Racing	(United States) Naveen Rao	1:49.424	+1.855	7
8	LMP2	25	(Portugal) Algarve Pro Racing	(Denmark) Michael Jensen	1:49.431	+1.862	8
9	LMP2	30	(France) RD Limited	(United States) Fred Poordad	1:50.902	+3.333	9
10	LMP2	20	(Portugal) Algarve Pro Racing	(Greece) Kriton Lendoudis	1:51.514	+3.945	10
11	**LMP3**	**49**	**(Denmark) High Class Racing**	**(Germany) Thomas Kiefer**	**1:54.906**	**+7.337**	11
12	LMP3	26	(Czech Republic) Bretton Racing	(Denmark) Jens Reno Møller	1:55.930	+8.361	12
13	LMP3	7	(Switzerland) Graff Racing	(Saint Kitts and Nevis) Alexander Bukhantsov	1:56.300	+8.731	13
14	LMP3	34	(Poland) Inter Europol Competition	(United Kingdom) Tim Creswick	1:56.445	+8.876	14
15	LMP3	15	(United Kingdom) RLR MSport	(United Kingdom) Nick Adcock	1:56.669	+9.100	15
16	LMP3	43	(Poland) Inter Europol Competition	(New Zealand) Steve Brooks	1:57.236	+9.667	16
17	LMP3	35	(France) Ultimate	(France) Louis Stern	1:57.975	+10.406	17
18	**GT**	**74**	**(Switzerland) Kessel Racing**	**(United States) Dustin Blattner**	**1:58.891**	**+11.322**	18
19	GT	81	(United States) Winward Racing	Rinat Salikhov	1:59.040	+11.471	19
20	GT	28	(Italy) AF Corse	(Italy) Massimiliano Wiser	1:59.257	+11.688	20
21	GT	9	(Germany) GetSpeed Performance	(Luxembourg) Steve Jans	1:59.276	+11.707	21
22	GT	87	(China) Origine Motorsport	(China) Yuan Bo	1:59.295	+11.726	22
23	GT	19	(United Kingdom) Blackthorn	(Saudi Arabia) Reema Juffali	1:59.300	+11.731	23
24	GT	16	(United States) Winward Racing	Sergey Stolyarov	1:59.301	+11.732	24
25	GT	77	(United Kingdom) Optimum Motorsport	(United Kingdom) Morgan Tillbrook	1:59.466	+11.897	25
26	GT	10	(Germany) Manthey Racing	(Hong Kong) Antares Au	1:59.472	+11.903	26
27	GT	96	(Bahrain) 2 Seas Motorsport	(United States) Anthony McIntosh	1:59.619	+12.050	27
28	GT	85	(Italy) Iron Dames	(France) Célia Martin	1:59.742	+12.173	28
29	GT	14	(China) Climax Racing	(China) Lü Wei	1:59.850	+12.281	29
30	GT	99	(Germany) Herberth Motorsport	(Germany) Ralf Bohn	1:59.964	+12.395	30
31	GT	2	(China) Climax Racing	(China) Zhou Bihuang	2:00.174	+12.605	31
32	GT	46	(Qatar) QMMF by Herberth	(Qatar) Abdulla Ali Al-Khelaifi	2:00.219	+12.650	32
33	GT	89	(New Zealand) Earl Bamber Motorsport	(Luxembourg) Gabriel Rindone	2:00.259	+12.690	33
34	GT	27	(United Kingdom) Optimum Motorsport	(United Kingdom) Andrew Gilbert	2:00.385	+12.816	34
35	GT	92	(Germany) Manthey EMA	(United States) Ryan Hardwick	2:00.517	+12.948	35
36	GT	51	(Italy) AF Corse	(Brazil) Custodio Toledo	2:00.781	+13.212	36
37	GT	12	(Germany) Car Collection Motorsport	(Canada) Bashar Mardini	2:00.926	+13.357	37
38	GT	82	(Italy) AF Corse	(France) Charles-Henri Samani	2:01.006	+13.437	WD (Note: The No. 82 AF Corse entry withdrew from the event after a crash during qualifying by driver Charles-Henri Samani.)
39	GT	42	(New Zealand) Prime Speed Sport	(New Zealand) René Heremana Malmezac	2:01.012	+13.443	38
40	GT	79	(San Marino) Tsunami RT	(Italy) Johannes Zelger	2:01.235	+13.666	39
41	GT	88	(United Arab Emirates) Dragon Racing	(Italy) Marco Pulcini	2:01.959	+14.390	40
42	GT	57	(Japan) Car Guy Racing	(Japan) Takeshi Kimura	2:02.484	+14.915	44 (Note: The No. 57 Car Guy Racing entry received a 3-place grid drop after causing a collision during the second race of the 2024 4 Hours of Sepang.)
43	GT	23	(Hong Kong) Absolute Racing	(United States) Gregory Bennett	2:02.685	+15.116	41
44	GT	60	(Germany) Proton Competition	(Italy) Claudio Schiavoni	2:02.831	+15.262	42
45	GT	8	(United Arab Emirates) Dragon Racing	(United States) Todd Coleman	2:02.989	+15.420	43

=== Race results ===
The minimum number of laps for classification (70% of overall winning car's distance) was 63 laps. Class winners are in bold and ‡.

Pos	Class	No	Team	Drivers	Chassis	Tyre	Laps	Time/Retired
Pos	Class	No	Team	Drivers	Engine	Tyre	Laps	Time/Retired
1	**LMP2**	**25**	**(Portugal) Algarve Pro Racing**	**(Denmark) Malthe Jakobsen (Denmark) Michael Jensen (Italy) Valerio Rinicella**	**Oreca 07**	MI	**90**	**4:01:35.856‡**
1	**LMP2**	**25**	**(Portugal) Algarve Pro Racing**	**(Denmark) Malthe Jakobsen (Denmark) Michael Jensen (Italy) Valerio Rinicella**	**Gibson GK428 4.2 L V8**	MI	**90**	**4:01:35.856‡**
2	LMP2	3	(Luxembourg) DKR Engineering	(Germany) Laurents Hörr (Greece) Georgios Kolovos (Netherlands) Job van Uitert	Oreca 07	MI	90	+11.342
2	LMP2	3	(Luxembourg) DKR Engineering	(Germany) Laurents Hörr (Greece) Georgios Kolovos (Netherlands) Job van Uitert	Gibson GK428 4.2 L V8	MI	90	+11.342
3	LMP2	20	(Portugal) Algarve Pro Racing	(United Kingdom) Olli Caldwell (Greece) Kriton Lendoudis (United Kingdom) Alex Quinn	Oreca 07	MI	90	+25.188
3	LMP2	20	(Portugal) Algarve Pro Racing	(United Kingdom) Olli Caldwell (Greece) Kriton Lendoudis (United Kingdom) Alex Quinn	Gibson GK428 4.2 L V8	MI	90	+25.188
4	LMP2	83	(Italy) AF Corse	(France) François Perrodo (Italy) Alessio Rovera (France) Matthieu Vaxivière	Oreca 07	MI	90	+27.309
4	LMP2	83	(Italy) AF Corse	(France) François Perrodo (Italy) Alessio Rovera (France) Matthieu Vaxivière	Gibson GK428 4.2 L V8	MI	90	+27.309
5	LMP2	22	(Germany) Proton Competition	(France) Tom Dillmann; Vladislav Lomko (Italy) Giorgio Roda	Oreca 07	MI	90	+31.766
5	LMP2	22	(Germany) Proton Competition	(France) Tom Dillmann; Vladislav Lomko (Italy) Giorgio Roda	Gibson GK428 4.2 L V8	MI	90	+31.766
6	LMP2	30	(France) RD Limited	(Australia) James Allen (United States) Fred Poordad (France) Tristan Vautier	Oreca 07	MI	90	+40.427 (Note: The No. 30 RD Limited entry received a 5-second penalty for overtaking off-track and gaining an advantage.)
6	LMP2	30	(France) RD Limited	(Australia) James Allen (United States) Fred Poordad (France) Tristan Vautier	Gibson GK428 4.2 L V8	MI	90	+40.427
7	LMP2	24	(United Kingdom) Nielsen Racing	(Netherlands) Nicky Catsburg (United Kingdom) Matt Bell (United States) Naveen Rao	Oreca 07	MI	90	+1:00.979
7	LMP2	24	(United Kingdom) Nielsen Racing	(Netherlands) Nicky Catsburg (United Kingdom) Matt Bell (United States) Naveen Rao	Gibson GK428 4.2 L V8	MI	90	+1:00.979
8	LMP2	91	(Lithuania) Pure Rxcing	(France) Julien Andlauer (United Kingdom) Harry King (Saint Kitts and Nevis) Alex Malykhin	Oreca 07	MI	90	+1:11.159
8	LMP2	91	(Lithuania) Pure Rxcing	(France) Julien Andlauer (United Kingdom) Harry King (Saint Kitts and Nevis) Alex Malykhin	Gibson GK428 4.2 L V8	MI	90	+1:11.159
9	LMP2	11	(Germany) Proton Competition	(Switzerland) Mathias Beche (Germany) Jonas Ried (Germany) Alexander Mattschull	Oreca 07	MI	89	+1 Lap
9	LMP2	11	(Germany) Proton Competition	(Switzerland) Mathias Beche (Germany) Jonas Ried (Germany) Alexander Mattschull	Gibson GK428 4.2 L V8	MI	89	+1 Lap
10	LMP2	50	(Italy) AF Corse	(United States) Patrick Byrne (United States) Jeremy Clarke (France) Olivier Pla	Oreca 07	MI	89	+1 Lap
10	LMP2	50	(Italy) AF Corse	(United States) Patrick Byrne (United States) Jeremy Clarke (France) Olivier Pla	Gibson GK428 4.2 L V8	MI	89	+1 Lap
11	**LMP3**	**26**	**(Czech Republic) Bretton Racing**	**(Denmark) Theodor Jensen (Denmark) Jens Reno Møller (Australia) Griffin Peebles**	**Ligier JS P320**	MI	**85**	**+5 Laps‡**
11	**LMP3**	**26**	**(Czech Republic) Bretton Racing**	**(Denmark) Theodor Jensen (Denmark) Jens Reno Møller (Australia) Griffin Peebles**	**Nissan VK56DE 5.6 L V8**	MI	**85**	**+5 Laps‡**
12	LMP3	35	(France) Ultimate	(Italy) Leonardo Colavita (France) Louis Stern (United Arab Emirates) Matteo Quintarelli	Ligier JS P320	MI	85	+5 Laps
12	LMP3	35	(France) Ultimate	(Italy) Leonardo Colavita (France) Louis Stern (United Arab Emirates) Matteo Quintarelli	Nissan VK56DE 5.6 L V8	MI	85	+5 Laps
13	**GT**	**96**	**(Bahrain) 2 Seas Motorsport**	**(United Kingdom) Ben Barnicoat (United States) Anthony McIntosh (Canada) Parker Thompson**	**Mercedes-AMG GT3 Evo**	MI	**85**	**+5 Laps‡**
13	**GT**	**96**	**(Bahrain) 2 Seas Motorsport**	**(United Kingdom) Ben Barnicoat (United States) Anthony McIntosh (Canada) Parker Thompson**	**Mercedes-AMG M159 6.2 L V8**	MI	**85**	**+5 Laps‡**
14	GT	92	(Germany) Manthey EMA	(United States) Ryan Hardwick (Austria) Richard Lietz (Italy) Riccardo Pera	Porsche 911 GT3 R (992)	MI	85	+5 Laps
14	GT	92	(Germany) Manthey EMA	(United States) Ryan Hardwick (Austria) Richard Lietz (Italy) Riccardo Pera	Porsche M97/80 4.2 L Flat-6	MI	85	+5 Laps
15	GT	74	(Switzerland) Kessel Racing	(United States) Dustin Blattner (Germany) Dennis Marschall (United Kingdom) Ben Tuck	Ferrari 296 GT3	MI	85	+5 Laps
15	GT	74	(Switzerland) Kessel Racing	(United States) Dustin Blattner (Germany) Dennis Marschall (United Kingdom) Ben Tuck	Ferrari F163CE 3.0 L Turbo V6	MI	85	+5 Laps
16	GT	87	(China) Origine Motorsport	(China) Yuan Bo (Germany) Laurin Heinrich (China) Leo Ye Hongli	Porsche 911 GT3 R (992)	MI	85	+5 Laps
16	GT	87	(China) Origine Motorsport	(China) Yuan Bo (Germany) Laurin Heinrich (China) Leo Ye Hongli	Porsche M97/80 4.2 L Flat-6	MI	85	+5 Laps
17	GT	10	(Germany) Manthey Racing	(Hong Kong) Antares Au (Austria) Klaus Bachler (Germany) Joel Sturm	Porsche 911 GT3 R (992)	MI	85	+5 Laps
17	GT	10	(Germany) Manthey Racing	(Hong Kong) Antares Au (Austria) Klaus Bachler (Germany) Joel Sturm	Porsche M97/80 4.2 L Flat-6	MI	85	+5 Laps
18	GT	16	(United States) Winward Racing	(Germany) Maro Engel; Viktor Shaytar; Sergey Stolyarov	Mercedes-AMG GT3 Evo	MI	85	+5 Laps
18	GT	16	(United States) Winward Racing	(Germany) Maro Engel; Viktor Shaytar; Sergey Stolyarov	Mercedes-AMG M159 6.2 L V8	MI	85	+5 Laps
19	GT	51	(Italy) AF Corse	(Italy) Riccardo Agostini (Monaco) Cédric Sbirrazzuoli (Brazil) Custodio Toledo	Ferrari 296 GT3	MI	85	+5 Laps
19	GT	51	(Italy) AF Corse	(Italy) Riccardo Agostini (Monaco) Cédric Sbirrazzuoli (Brazil) Custodio Toledo	Ferrari F163CE 3.0 L Turbo V6	MI	85	+5 Laps
20	GT	60	(Germany) Proton Competition	(Italy) Matteo Cressoni (Belgium) Alessio Picariello (Italy) Claudio Schiavoni	Porsche 911 GT3 R (992)	MI	85	+5 Laps
20	GT	60	(Germany) Proton Competition	(Italy) Matteo Cressoni (Belgium) Alessio Picariello (Italy) Claudio Schiavoni	Porsche M97/80 4.2 L Flat-6	MI	85	+5 Laps
21	GT	2	(China) Climax Racing	(Estonia) Ralf Aron (Finland) Elias Seppänen (China) Zhou Bihuang	Mercedes-AMG GT3 Evo	MI	85	+5 Laps
21	GT	2	(China) Climax Racing	(Estonia) Ralf Aron (Finland) Elias Seppänen (China) Zhou Bihuang	Mercedes-AMG M159 6.2 L V8	MI	85	+5 Laps
22	GT	14	(China) Climax Racing	(Austria) Lucas Auer (China) Ling Kang (China) Lü Wei	Mercedes-AMG GT3 Evo	MI	85	+5 Laps (Note: The No. 14 Climax Racing entry received a 1-minute, 48.330-second time penalty after Lucas Auer failed to adhere to drive time regulations.)
22	GT	14	(China) Climax Racing	(Austria) Lucas Auer (China) Ling Kang (China) Lü Wei	Mercedes-AMG M159 6.2 L V8	MI	85	+5 Laps
23	GT	57	(Japan) Car Guy Racing	(Japan) Takeshi Kimura (Brazil) Daniel Serra (United Kingdom) Casper Stevenson	Ferrari 296 GT3	MI	84	+6 Laps
23	GT	57	(Japan) Car Guy Racing	(Japan) Takeshi Kimura (Brazil) Daniel Serra (United Kingdom) Casper Stevenson	Ferrari F163CE 3.0 L Turbo V6	MI	84	+6 Laps
24	GT	12	(Germany) Car Collection Motorsport	(United Kingdom) James Kell (Canada) Bashar Mardini (Germany) Nico Menzel	Porsche 911 GT3 R (992)	MI	84	+6 Laps
24	GT	12	(Germany) Car Collection Motorsport	(United Kingdom) James Kell (Canada) Bashar Mardini (Germany) Nico Menzel	Porsche M97/80 4.2 L Flat-6	MI	84	+6 Laps
25	LMP3	34	(Poland) Inter Europol Competition	(Canada) Daniel Ali (United Kingdom) Tim Creswick (Belgium) Douwe Dedecker	Ligier JS P320	MI	84	+6 Laps
25	LMP3	34	(Poland) Inter Europol Competition	(Canada) Daniel Ali (United Kingdom) Tim Creswick (Belgium) Douwe Dedecker	Nissan VK56DE 5.6 L V8	MI	84	+6 Laps
26	GT	27	(United Kingdom) Optimum Motorsport	(United Kingdom) Andrew Gilbert (Germany) Benjamin Goethe (Spain) Fran Rueda	McLaren 720S GT3 Evo	MI	84	+6 Laps
26	GT	27	(United Kingdom) Optimum Motorsport	(United Kingdom) Andrew Gilbert (Germany) Benjamin Goethe (Spain) Fran Rueda	McLaren M840T 4.0 L Turbo V8	MI	84	+6 Laps
27	LMP3	49	(Denmark) High Class Racing	(Denmark) Anders Fjordbach (Germany) Thomas Kiefer (United States) Mark Patterson	Ligier JS P320	MI	84	+6 Laps
27	LMP3	49	(Denmark) High Class Racing	(Denmark) Anders Fjordbach (Germany) Thomas Kiefer (United States) Mark Patterson	Nissan VK56DE 5.6 L V8	MI	84	+6 Laps
28	GT	19	(United Kingdom) Blackthorn	(United Kingdom) Jonathan Adam (United Kingdom) Charles Bateman (Saudi Arabia) Reema Juffali	Aston Martin Vantage AMR GT3 Evo	MI	84	+6 Laps
28	GT	19	(United Kingdom) Blackthorn	(United Kingdom) Jonathan Adam (United Kingdom) Charles Bateman (Saudi Arabia) Reema Juffali	Aston Martin M177 4.0 L Turbo V8	MI	84	+6 Laps
29	GT	85	(Italy) Iron Dames	(Belgium) Sarah Bovy (Denmark) Michelle Gatting (France) Célia Martin	Porsche 911 GT3 R (992)	MI	84	+6 Laps
29	GT	85	(Italy) Iron Dames	(Belgium) Sarah Bovy (Denmark) Michelle Gatting (France) Célia Martin	Porsche M97/80 4.2 L Flat-6	MI	84	+6 Laps
30	GT	28	(Italy) AF Corse	(United States) Manny Franco (Italy) Davide Rigon (Italy) Massimiliano Wiser	Ferrari 296 GT3	MI	84	+6 Laps
30	GT	28	(Italy) AF Corse	(United States) Manny Franco (Italy) Davide Rigon (Italy) Massimiliano Wiser	Ferrari F163CE 3.0 L Turbo V6	MI	84	+6 Laps
31	GT	46	(Qatar) QMMF by Herberth	(Qatar) Ibrahim Al-Abdulghani (Qatar) Abdulla Ali Al-Khelaifi (Qatar) Ghanim Ali Al Maadheed	Porsche 911 GT3 R (992)	MI	83	+7 Laps
31	GT	46	(Qatar) QMMF by Herberth	(Qatar) Ibrahim Al-Abdulghani (Qatar) Abdulla Ali Al-Khelaifi (Qatar) Ghanim Ali Al Maadheed	Porsche M97/80 4.2 L Flat-6	MI	83	+7 Laps
32	GT	23	(Hong Kong) Absolute Racing	(Thailand) Carl Bennett (United States) Gregory Bennett (New Zealand) Chris van der Drift	Ferrari 296 GT3	MI	83	+7 Laps
32	GT	23	(Hong Kong) Absolute Racing	(Thailand) Carl Bennett (United States) Gregory Bennett (New Zealand) Chris van der Drift	Ferrari F163CE 3.0 L Turbo V6	MI	83	+7 Laps
33	GT	88	(United Arab Emirates) Dragon Racing	(Italy) Giacomo Altoè (Italy) Nicola Marinangeli (Italy) Marco Pulcini	Ferrari 296 GT3	MI	83	+7 Laps
33	GT	88	(United Arab Emirates) Dragon Racing	(Italy) Giacomo Altoè (Italy) Nicola Marinangeli (Italy) Marco Pulcini	Ferrari F163CE 3.0 L Turbo V6	MI	83	+7 Laps
34	GT	89	(New Zealand) Earl Bamber Motorsport	(United Kingdom) Jamie Day (Italy) Mattia Drudi (Luxembourg) Gabriel Rindone	Aston Martin Vantage AMR GT3 Evo	MI	83	+7 Laps
34	GT	89	(New Zealand) Earl Bamber Motorsport	(United Kingdom) Jamie Day (Italy) Mattia Drudi (Luxembourg) Gabriel Rindone	Aston Martin M177 4.0 L Turbo V8	MI	83	+7 Laps
35	GT	42	(New Zealand) Prime Speed Sport	(Australia) Nick Foster (New Zealand) Jono Lester (New Zealand) René Heremana Malmezac	Lamborghini Huracán GT3 Evo 2	MI	83	+7 Laps
35	GT	42	(New Zealand) Prime Speed Sport	(Australia) Nick Foster (New Zealand) Jono Lester (New Zealand) René Heremana Malmezac	Lamborghini DGF 5.2 L V10	MI	83	+7 Laps
36	GT	79	(San Marino) Tsunami RT	(Italy) Fabio Babini (New Zealand) Daniel Gaunt (Italy) Johannes Zelger	Porsche 911 GT3 R (992)	MI	83	+7 Laps (Note: The No. 79 Tsunami RT entry received a drive-through penalty converted to a 25-second time penalty for abuse of track limits.)
36	GT	79	(San Marino) Tsunami RT	(Italy) Fabio Babini (New Zealand) Daniel Gaunt (Italy) Johannes Zelger	Porsche M97/80 4.2 L Flat-6	MI	83	+7 Laps
37	LMP3	43	(Poland) Inter Europol Competition	(New Zealand) Steve Brooks (Denmark) Mikkel Kristensen (Switzerland) Kévin Rabin	Ligier JS P320	MI	82	+8 Laps
37	LMP3	43	(Poland) Inter Europol Competition	(New Zealand) Steve Brooks (Denmark) Mikkel Kristensen (Switzerland) Kévin Rabin	Nissan VK56DE 5.6 L V8	MI	82	+8 Laps
38	GT	99	(Germany) Herberth Motorsport	(Germany) Ralf Bohn (Germany) Alfred Renauer (Germany) Robert Renauer	Porsche 911 GT3 R (992)	MI	81	+9 Laps
38	GT	99	(Germany) Herberth Motorsport	(Germany) Ralf Bohn (Germany) Alfred Renauer (Germany) Robert Renauer	Porsche M97/80 4.2 L Flat-6	MI	81	+9 Laps
39	LMP3	7	(Switzerland) Graff Racing	(Saint Kitts and Nevis) Alexander Bukhantsov (Singapore) Danial Frost (United Kingdom) James Winslow	Ligier JS P320	MI	71	+19 Laps (Note: The No. 7 Graff Racing entry received a 4-lap deduction and an additional 1-minute, 22.916-second time penalty after Alexander Bukhantsov failed to adhere to drive time regulations.)
39	LMP3	7	(Switzerland) Graff Racing	(Saint Kitts and Nevis) Alexander Bukhantsov (Singapore) Danial Frost (United Kingdom) James Winslow	Nissan VK56DE 5.6 L V8	MI	71	+19 Laps
40	GT	9	(Germany) GetSpeed Performance	(United States) Anthony Bartone (Luxembourg) Steve Jans (Germany) Fabian Schiller	Mercedes-AMG GT3 Evo	MI	66	+24 Laps
40	GT	9	(Germany) GetSpeed Performance	(United States) Anthony Bartone (Luxembourg) Steve Jans (Germany) Fabian Schiller	Mercedes-AMG M159 6.2 L V8	MI	66	+24 Laps
Not classified
	GT	77	(United Kingdom) Optimum Motorsport	(United Kingdom) Tom Ikin (Germany) Marvin Kirchhöfer (United Kingdom) Morgan Tillbrook	McLaren 720S GT3 Evo	MI	39	Not classified (Note: The No. 77 Optimum Motorsport entry received a 10-second time penalty for causing a collision.)
	GT	77	(United Kingdom) Optimum Motorsport	(United Kingdom) Tom Ikin (Germany) Marvin Kirchhöfer (United Kingdom) Morgan Tillbrook	McLaren M840T 4.0 L Turbo V8	MI	39	Not classified
	GT	81	(United States) Winward Racing	(Italy) Gabriele Piana; Rinat Salikhov (Germany) Luca Stolz	Mercedes-AMG GT3 Evo	MI	33	Did not finish
	GT	81	(United States) Winward Racing	(Italy) Gabriele Piana; Rinat Salikhov (Germany) Luca Stolz	Mercedes-AMG M159 6.2 L V8	MI	33	Did not finish
	LMP3	15	(United Kingdom) RLR MSport	(United Kingdom) Nick Adcock (Mexico) Ian Aguilera (United Kingdom) Chris Short	Ligier JS P320	MI	28	Did not finish
	LMP3	15	(United Kingdom) RLR MSport	(United Kingdom) Nick Adcock (Mexico) Ian Aguilera (United Kingdom) Chris Short	Nissan VK56DE 5.6 L V8	MI	28	Did not finish
	GT	8	(United Arab Emirates) Dragon Racing	(United States) Todd Coleman (United Kingdom) Lorcan Hanafin (United States) Aaron Telitz	Ferrari 296 GT3	MI	24	Did not finish
	GT	8	(United Arab Emirates) Dragon Racing	(United States) Todd Coleman (United Kingdom) Lorcan Hanafin (United States) Aaron Telitz	Ferrari F163CE 3.0 L Turbo V6	MI	24	Did not finish

=== Statistics ===
==== Fastest lap ====
Class	No.	Entrant	Driver	Time	Lap
LMP2	3	(Luxembourg) DKR Engineering	(Germany) Laurents Hörr	1:47.697	64
LMP3	26	(Czech Republic) Bretton Racing	(Australia) Griffin Peebles	1:56.181	40
GT	92	(Germany) Manthey EMA	(Austria) Richard Lietz	1:59.162	65

== Race 2 ==
=== Qualifying results ===
Pole position winners in each class are marked in bold.

Pos	Class	No.	Team	Driver	Time	Gap	Grid
1	**LMP2**	**22**	**(Germany) Proton Competition**	**(Italy) Giorgio Roda**	**1:48.049**	—	1
2	LMP2	50	(Italy) AF Corse	(United States) Jeremy Clarke	1:48.293	+0.244	2
3	LMP2	91	(Lithuania) Pure Rxcing	(Saint Kitts and Nevis) Alex Malykhin	1:48.433	+0.384	3
4	LMP2	11	(Germany) Proton Competition	(Germany) Alexander Mattschull	1:48.986	+0.937	4
5	LMP2	83	(Italy) AF Corse	(France) François Perrodo	1:49.423	+1.374	5
6	LMP2	24	(United Kingdom) Nielsen Racing	(United States) Naveen Rao	1:49.555	+1.506	6
7	LMP2	3	(Luxembourg) DKR Engineering	(Greece) Georgios Kolovos	1:49.587	+1.538	7
8	LMP2	25	(Portugal) Algarve Pro Racing	(Denmark) Michael Jensen	1:49.665	+1.616	8
9	LMP2	30	(France) RD Limited	(United States) Fred Poordad	1:51.096	+3.047	9
10	LMP2	20	(Portugal) Algarve Pro Racing	(Greece) Kriton Lendoudis	1:52.331	+4.282	10
11	**LMP3**	**49**	**(Denmark) High Class Racing**	**(Germany) Thomas Kiefer**	**1:54.942**	**+6.893**	11
12	LMP3	7	(Switzerland) Graff Racing	(Saint Kitts and Nevis) Alexander Bukhantsov	1:56.318	+8.269	12
13	LMP3	26	(Czech Republic) Bretton Racing	(Denmark) Jens Reno Møller	1:56.488	+8.439	13
14	LMP3	15	(United Kingdom) RLR MSport	(United Kingdom) Nick Adcock	1:56.764	+8.715	14
15	LMP3	34	(Poland) Inter Europol Competition	(United Kingdom) Tim Creswick	1:56.810	+8.761	15
16	LMP3	43	(Poland) Inter Europol Competition	(New Zealand) Steve Brooks	1:57.424	+9.375	16
17	LMP3	35	(France) Ultimate	(France) Louis Stern	1:58.128	+10.079	17
18	**GT**	**74**	**(Switzerland) Kessel Racing**	**(United States) Dustin Blattner**	**1:58.960**	**+10.911**	18
19	GT	87	(China) Origine Motorsport	(China) Yuan Bo	1:59.337	+11.288	19
20	GT	19	(United Kingdom) Blackthorn	(Saudi Arabia) Reema Juffali	1:59.380	+11.331	20
21	GT	9	(Germany) GetSpeed Performance	(Luxembourg) Steve Jans	1:59.423	+11.374	21
22	GT	81	(United States) Winward Racing	Rinat Salikhov	1:59.432	+11.383	22
23	GT	10	(Germany) Manthey Racing	(Hong Kong) Antares Au	1:59.512	+11.463	23
24	GT	28	(Italy) AF Corse	(Italy) Massimiliano Wiser	1:59.760	+11.711	24
25	GT	16	(United States) Winward Racing	Sergey Stolyarov	1:59.965	+11.916	25
26	GT	14	(China) Climax Racing	(China) Lü Wei	2:00.008	+11.959	26
27	GT	99	(Germany) Herberth Motorsport	(Germany) Ralf Bohn	2:00.146	+12.097	27
28	GT	96	(Bahrain) 2 Seas Motorsport	(United States) Anthony McIntosh	2:00.204	+12.155	28
29	GT	2	(China) Climax Racing	(China) Zhou Bihuang	2:00.288	+12.239	29
30	GT	85	(Italy) Iron Dames	(France) Célia Martin	2:00.318	+12.269	30
31	GT	89	(New Zealand) Earl Bamber Motorsport	(Luxembourg) Gabriel Rindone	2:00.424	+12.375	31
32	GT	46	(Qatar) QMMF by Herberth	(Qatar) Abdulla Ali Al-Khelaifi	2:00.547	+12.498	32
33	GT	51	(Italy) AF Corse	(Brazil) Custodio Toledo	2:01.001	+12.952	33
34	GT	82	(Italy) AF Corse	(France) Charles-Henri Samani	2:01.365	+13.316	WD
35	GT	79	(San Marino) Tsunami RT	(Italy) Johannes Zelger	2:01.713	+13.664	34
36	GT	27	(United Kingdom) Optimum Motorsport	(United Kingdom) Andrew Gilbert	2:02.355	+14.306	35
37	GT	57	(Japan) Car Guy Racing	(Japan) Takeshi Kimura	2:02.551	+14.502	36
38	GT	42	(New Zealand) Prime Speed Sport	(New Zealand) René Heremana Malmezac	2:02.584	+14.535	37
39	GT	12	(Germany) Car Collection Motorsport	(Canada) Bashar Mardini	2:02.822	+14.773	38
40	GT	23	(Hong Kong) Absolute Racing	(United States) Gregory Bennett	2:03.052	+15.003	39
41	GT	60	(Germany) Proton Competition	(Italy) Claudio Schiavoni	2:03.275	+15.226	40
42	GT	8	(United Arab Emirates) Dragon Racing	(United States) Todd Coleman	2:03.944	+15.895	WD (Note: The No. 8 Dragon Racing entry withdrew from race 2 after a heavy crash during the first race.)
43	GT	88	(United Arab Emirates) Dragon Racing	(Italy) Marco Pulcini	2:05.125	+17.076	41
44	GT	77	(United Kingdom) Optimum Motorsport	(United Kingdom) Morgan Tillbrook	2:05.477	+17.428	42
45	GT	92	(Germany) Manthey EMA	(United States) Ryan Hardwick	2:06.490	+18.441	43

=== Race results ===
The minimum number of laps for classification (70% of overall winning car's distance) was 77 laps. Class winners are in bold and ‡.

Pos	Class	No	Team	Drivers	Chassis	Tyre	Laps	Time/Retired
Pos	Class	No	Team	Drivers	Engine	Tyre	Laps	Time/Retired
1	**LMP2**	**20**	**(Portugal) Algarve Pro Racing**	**(United Kingdom) Olli Caldwell (Greece) Kriton Lendoudis (United Kingdom) Alex Quinn**	**Oreca 07**	MI	**110**	**4:01:18.395‡**
1	**LMP2**	**20**	**(Portugal) Algarve Pro Racing**	**(United Kingdom) Olli Caldwell (Greece) Kriton Lendoudis (United Kingdom) Alex Quinn**	**Gibson GK428 4.2 L V8**	MI	**110**	**4:01:18.395‡**
2	LMP2	30	(France) RD Limited	(Australia) James Allen (United States) Fred Poordad (France) Tristan Vautier	Oreca 07	MI	110	+6.591
2	LMP2	30	(France) RD Limited	(Australia) James Allen (United States) Fred Poordad (France) Tristan Vautier	Gibson GK428 4.2 L V8	MI	110	+6.591
3	LMP2	83	(Italy) AF Corse	(France) François Perrodo (Italy) Alessio Rovera (France) Matthieu Vaxivière	Oreca 07	MI	110	+8.090
3	LMP2	83	(Italy) AF Corse	(France) François Perrodo (Italy) Alessio Rovera (France) Matthieu Vaxivière	Gibson GK428 4.2 L V8	MI	110	+8.090
4	LMP2	22	(Germany) Proton Competition	(France) Tom Dillmann; Vladislav Lomko (Italy) Giorgio Roda	Oreca 07	MI	110	+16.775
4	LMP2	22	(Germany) Proton Competition	(France) Tom Dillmann; Vladislav Lomko (Italy) Giorgio Roda	Gibson GK428 4.2 L V8	MI	110	+16.775
5	LMP2	25	(Portugal) Algarve Pro Racing	(Denmark) Malthe Jakobsen (Denmark) Michael Jensen (Italy) Valerio Rinicella	Oreca 07	MI	110	+43.991
5	LMP2	25	(Portugal) Algarve Pro Racing	(Denmark) Malthe Jakobsen (Denmark) Michael Jensen (Italy) Valerio Rinicella	Gibson GK428 4.2 L V8	MI	110	+43.991
6	LMP2	50	(Italy) AF Corse	(United States) Patrick Byrne (United States) Jeremy Clarke (France) Olivier Pla	Oreca 07	MI	110	+45.450
6	LMP2	50	(Italy) AF Corse	(United States) Patrick Byrne (United States) Jeremy Clarke (France) Olivier Pla	Gibson GK428 4.2 L V8	MI	110	+45.450
7	LMP2	24	(United Kingdom) Nielsen Racing	(Netherlands) Nicky Catsburg (United Kingdom) Matt Bell (United States) Naveen Rao	Oreca 07	MI	110	+46.129
7	LMP2	24	(United Kingdom) Nielsen Racing	(Netherlands) Nicky Catsburg (United Kingdom) Matt Bell (United States) Naveen Rao	Gibson GK428 4.2 L V8	MI	110	+46.129
8	LMP2	91	(Lithuania) Pure Rxcing	(France) Julien Andlauer (United Kingdom) Harry King (Saint Kitts and Nevis) Alex Malykhin	Oreca 07	MI	110	+1:00.480
8	LMP2	91	(Lithuania) Pure Rxcing	(France) Julien Andlauer (United Kingdom) Harry King (Saint Kitts and Nevis) Alex Malykhin	Gibson GK428 4.2 L V8	MI	110	+1:00.480
9	LMP2	3	(Luxembourg) DKR Engineering	(Germany) Laurents Hörr (Greece) Georgios Kolovos (Netherlands) Job van Uitert	Oreca 07	MI	108	+2 Laps
9	LMP2	3	(Luxembourg) DKR Engineering	(Germany) Laurents Hörr (Greece) Georgios Kolovos (Netherlands) Job van Uitert	Gibson GK428 4.2 L V8	MI	108	+2 Laps
10	**LMP3**	**15**	**(United Kingdom) RLR MSport**	**(United Kingdom) Nick Adcock (Mexico) Ian Aguilera (United Kingdom) Chris Short**	**Ligier JS P320**	MI	**106**	**+4 Laps‡**
10	**LMP3**	**15**	**(United Kingdom) RLR MSport**	**(United Kingdom) Nick Adcock (Mexico) Ian Aguilera (United Kingdom) Chris Short**	**Nissan VK56DE 5.6 L V8**	MI	**106**	**+4 Laps‡**
11	LMP3	26	(Czech Republic) Bretton Racing	(Denmark) Theodor Jensen (Denmark) Jens Reno Møller (Australia) Griffin Peebles	Ligier JS P320	MI	106	+4 Laps
11	LMP3	26	(Czech Republic) Bretton Racing	(Denmark) Theodor Jensen (Denmark) Jens Reno Møller (Australia) Griffin Peebles	Nissan VK56DE 5.6 L V8	MI	106	+4 Laps
12	LMP3	49	(Denmark) High Class Racing	(Denmark) Anders Fjordbach (Germany) Thomas Kiefer (United States) Mark Patterson	Ligier JS P320	MI	106	+4 Laps
12	LMP3	49	(Denmark) High Class Racing	(Denmark) Anders Fjordbach (Germany) Thomas Kiefer (United States) Mark Patterson	Nissan VK56DE 5.6 L V8	MI	106	+4 Laps
13	LMP3	7	(Switzerland) Graff Racing	(Saint Kitts and Nevis) Alexander Bukhantsov (Singapore) Danial Frost (United Kingdom) James Winslow	Ligier JS P320	MI	106	+4 Laps
13	LMP3	7	(Switzerland) Graff Racing	(Saint Kitts and Nevis) Alexander Bukhantsov (Singapore) Danial Frost (United Kingdom) James Winslow	Nissan VK56DE 5.6 L V8	MI	106	+4 Laps
14	LMP3	34	(Poland) Inter Europol Competition	(Canada) Daniel Ali (United Kingdom) Tim Creswick (Belgium) Douwe Dedecker	Ligier JS P320	MI	106	+4 Laps
14	LMP3	34	(Poland) Inter Europol Competition	(Canada) Daniel Ali (United Kingdom) Tim Creswick (Belgium) Douwe Dedecker	Nissan VK56DE 5.6 L V8	MI	106	+4 Laps
15	LMP3	43	(Poland) Inter Europol Competition	(New Zealand) Steve Brooks (Denmark) Mikkel Kristensen (Switzerland) Kévin Rabin	Ligier JS P320	MI	105	+5 Laps
15	LMP3	43	(Poland) Inter Europol Competition	(New Zealand) Steve Brooks (Denmark) Mikkel Kristensen (Switzerland) Kévin Rabin	Nissan VK56DE 5.6 L V8	MI	105	+5 Laps
16	**GT**	**99**	**(Germany) Herberth Motorsport**	**(Germany) Ralf Bohn (Germany) Alfred Renauer (Germany) Robert Renauer**	**Porsche 911 GT3 R (992)**	MI	**104**	**+6 Laps‡**
16	**GT**	**99**	**(Germany) Herberth Motorsport**	**(Germany) Ralf Bohn (Germany) Alfred Renauer (Germany) Robert Renauer**	**Porsche M97/80 4.2 L Flat-6**	MI	**104**	**+6 Laps‡**
17	GT	81	(United States) Winward Racing	(Italy) Gabriele Piana; Rinat Salikhov (Germany) Luca Stolz	Mercedes-AMG GT3 Evo	MI	104	+6 Laps
17	GT	81	(United States) Winward Racing	(Italy) Gabriele Piana; Rinat Salikhov (Germany) Luca Stolz	Mercedes-AMG M159 6.2 L V8	MI	104	+6 Laps
18	GT	89	(New Zealand) Earl Bamber Motorsport	(United Kingdom) Jamie Day (Italy) Mattia Drudi (Luxembourg) Gabriel Rindone	Aston Martin Vantage AMR GT3 Evo	MI	104	+6 Laps
18	GT	89	(New Zealand) Earl Bamber Motorsport	(United Kingdom) Jamie Day (Italy) Mattia Drudi (Luxembourg) Gabriel Rindone	Aston Martin M177 4.0 L Turbo V8	MI	104	+6 Laps
19	GT	10	(Germany) Manthey Racing	(Hong Kong) Antares Au (Austria) Klaus Bachler (Germany) Joel Sturm	Porsche 911 GT3 R (992)	MI	104	+6 Laps
19	GT	10	(Germany) Manthey Racing	(Hong Kong) Antares Au (Austria) Klaus Bachler (Germany) Joel Sturm	Porsche M97/80 4.2 L Flat-6	MI	104	+6 Laps
20	GT	92	(Germany) Manthey EMA	(United States) Ryan Hardwick (Austria) Richard Lietz (Italy) Riccardo Pera	Porsche 911 GT3 R (992)	MI	104	+6 Laps
20	GT	92	(Germany) Manthey EMA	(United States) Ryan Hardwick (Austria) Richard Lietz (Italy) Riccardo Pera	Porsche M97/80 4.2 L Flat-6	MI	104	+6 Laps
21	GT	96	(Bahrain) 2 Seas Motorsport	(United Kingdom) Ben Barnicoat (United States) Anthony McIntosh (Canada) Parker Thompson	Mercedes-AMG GT3 Evo	MI	104	+6 Laps
21	GT	96	(Bahrain) 2 Seas Motorsport	(United Kingdom) Ben Barnicoat (United States) Anthony McIntosh (Canada) Parker Thompson	Mercedes-AMG M159 6.2 L V8	MI	104	+6 Laps
22	GT	2	(China) Climax Racing	(Estonia) Ralf Aron (Finland) Elias Seppänen (China) Zhou Bihuang	Mercedes-AMG GT3 Evo	MI	104	+6 Laps
22	GT	2	(China) Climax Racing	(Estonia) Ralf Aron (Finland) Elias Seppänen (China) Zhou Bihuang	Mercedes-AMG M159 6.2 L V8	MI	104	+6 Laps
23	GT	87	(China) Origine Motorsport	(China) Yuan Bo (Germany) Laurin Heinrich (China) Leo Ye Hongli	Porsche 911 GT3 R (992)	MI	104	+6 Laps
23	GT	87	(China) Origine Motorsport	(China) Yuan Bo (Germany) Laurin Heinrich (China) Leo Ye Hongli	Porsche M97/80 4.2 L Flat-6	MI	104	+6 Laps
24	GT	12	(Germany) Car Collection Motorsport	(United Kingdom) James Kell (Canada) Bashar Mardini (Germany) Nico Menzel	Porsche 911 GT3 R (992)	MI	104	+6 Laps
24	GT	12	(Germany) Car Collection Motorsport	(United Kingdom) James Kell (Canada) Bashar Mardini (Germany) Nico Menzel	Porsche M97/80 4.2 L Flat-6	MI	104	+6 Laps
25	GT	74	(Switzerland) Kessel Racing	(United States) Dustin Blattner (Germany) Dennis Marschall (United Kingdom) Ben Tuck	Ferrari 296 GT3	MI	104	+6 Laps
25	GT	74	(Switzerland) Kessel Racing	(United States) Dustin Blattner (Germany) Dennis Marschall (United Kingdom) Ben Tuck	Ferrari F163CE 3.0 L Turbo V6	MI	104	+6 Laps
26	GT	57	(Japan) Car Guy Racing	(Japan) Takeshi Kimura (Brazil) Daniel Serra (United Kingdom) Casper Stevenson	Ferrari 296 GT3	MI	104	+6 Laps
26	GT	57	(Japan) Car Guy Racing	(Japan) Takeshi Kimura (Brazil) Daniel Serra (United Kingdom) Casper Stevenson	Ferrari F163CE 3.0 L Turbo V6	MI	104	+6 Laps
27	GT	51	(Italy) AF Corse	(Italy) Riccardo Agostini (Monaco) Cédric Sbirrazzuoli (Brazil) Custodio Toledo	Ferrari 296 GT3	MI	104	+6 Laps
27	GT	51	(Italy) AF Corse	(Italy) Riccardo Agostini (Monaco) Cédric Sbirrazzuoli (Brazil) Custodio Toledo	Ferrari F163CE 3.0 L Turbo V6	MI	104	+6 Laps
28	GT	14	(China) Climax Racing	(Austria) Lucas Auer (China) Ling Kang (China) Lü Wei	Mercedes-AMG GT3 Evo	MI	104	+6 Laps
28	GT	14	(China) Climax Racing	(Austria) Lucas Auer (China) Ling Kang (China) Lü Wei	Mercedes-AMG M159 6.2 L V8	MI	104	+6 Laps
29	GT	19	(United Kingdom) Blackthorn	(United Kingdom) Jonathan Adam (United Kingdom) Charles Bateman (Saudi Arabia) Reema Juffali	Aston Martin Vantage AMR GT3 Evo	MI	104	+6 Laps
29	GT	19	(United Kingdom) Blackthorn	(United Kingdom) Jonathan Adam (United Kingdom) Charles Bateman (Saudi Arabia) Reema Juffali	Aston Martin M177 4.0 L Turbo V8	MI	104	+6 Laps
30	GT	60	(Germany) Proton Competition	(Italy) Matteo Cressoni (Belgium) Alessio Picariello (Italy) Claudio Schiavoni	Porsche 911 GT3 R (992)	MI	104	+6 Laps
30	GT	60	(Germany) Proton Competition	(Italy) Matteo Cressoni (Belgium) Alessio Picariello (Italy) Claudio Schiavoni	Porsche M97/80 4.2 L Flat-6	MI	104	+6 Laps
31	GT	9	(Germany) GetSpeed Performance	(United States) Anthony Bartone (Luxembourg) Steve Jans (Germany) Fabian Schiller	Mercedes-AMG GT3 Evo	MI	104	+6 Laps
31	GT	9	(Germany) GetSpeed Performance	(United States) Anthony Bartone (Luxembourg) Steve Jans (Germany) Fabian Schiller	Mercedes-AMG M159 6.2 L V8	MI	104	+6 Laps
32	GT	88	(United Arab Emirates) Dragon Racing	(Italy) Giacomo Altoè (Italy) Nicola Marinangeli (Italy) Marco Pulcini	Ferrari 296 GT3	MI	104	+6 Laps
32	GT	88	(United Arab Emirates) Dragon Racing	(Italy) Giacomo Altoè (Italy) Nicola Marinangeli (Italy) Marco Pulcini	Ferrari F163CE 3.0 L Turbo V6	MI	104	+6 Laps
33	GT	16	(United States) Winward Racing	(Germany) Maro Engel; Viktor Shaytar; Sergey Stolyarov	Mercedes-AMG GT3 Evo	MI	104	+6 Laps (Note: The No. 16 Winward Racing entry received a 3.332-second time penalty after Maro Engel failed to adhere to drive time regulations.)
33	GT	16	(United States) Winward Racing	(Germany) Maro Engel; Viktor Shaytar; Sergey Stolyarov	Mercedes-AMG M159 6.2 L V8	MI	104	+6 Laps
34	GT	28	(Italy) AF Corse	(United States) Manny Franco (Italy) Davide Rigon (Italy) Massimiliano Wiser	Ferrari 296 GT3	MI	103	+7 Laps
34	GT	28	(Italy) AF Corse	(United States) Manny Franco (Italy) Davide Rigon (Italy) Massimiliano Wiser	Ferrari F163CE 3.0 L Turbo V6	MI	103	+7 Laps
35	GT	79	(San Marino) Tsunami RT	(Italy) Fabio Babini (New Zealand) Daniel Gaunt (Italy) Johannes Zelger	Porsche 911 GT3 R (992)	MI	103	+7 Laps
35	GT	79	(San Marino) Tsunami RT	(Italy) Fabio Babini (New Zealand) Daniel Gaunt (Italy) Johannes Zelger	Porsche M97/80 4.2 L Flat-6	MI	103	+7 Laps
36	GT	23	(Hong Kong) Absolute Racing	(Thailand) Carl Bennett (United States) Gregory Bennett (New Zealand) Chris van der Drift	Ferrari 296 GT3	MI	103	+7 Laps
36	GT	23	(Hong Kong) Absolute Racing	(Thailand) Carl Bennett (United States) Gregory Bennett (New Zealand) Chris van der Drift	Ferrari F163CE 3.0 L Turbo V6	MI	103	+7 Laps
37	GT	46	(Qatar) QMMF by Herberth	(Qatar) Ibrahim Al-Abdulghani (Qatar) Abdulla Ali Al-Khelaifi (Qatar) Ghanim Ali Al Maadheed	Porsche 911 GT3 R (992)	MI	100	+10 Laps
37	GT	46	(Qatar) QMMF by Herberth	(Qatar) Ibrahim Al-Abdulghani (Qatar) Abdulla Ali Al-Khelaifi (Qatar) Ghanim Ali Al Maadheed	Porsche M97/80 4.2 L Flat-6	MI	100	+10 Laps
38	GT	85	(Italy) Iron Dames	(Belgium) Sarah Bovy (Denmark) Michelle Gatting (France) Célia Martin	Porsche 911 GT3 R (992)	MI	100	+10 Laps
38	GT	85	(Italy) Iron Dames	(Belgium) Sarah Bovy (Denmark) Michelle Gatting (France) Célia Martin	Porsche M97/80 4.2 L Flat-6	MI	100	+10 Laps
Not classified
	LMP2	11	(Germany) Proton Competition	(Switzerland) Mathias Beche (Germany) Jonas Ried (Germany) Alexander Mattschull	Oreca 07	MI	89	Did not finish
	LMP2	11	(Germany) Proton Competition	(Switzerland) Mathias Beche (Germany) Jonas Ried (Germany) Alexander Mattschull	Gibson GK428 4.2 L V8	MI	89	Did not finish
	LMP3	35	(France) Ultimate	(Italy) Leonardo Colavita (France) Louis Stern (United Arab Emirates) Matteo Quintarelli	Ligier JS P320	MI	61	Did not finish
	LMP3	35	(France) Ultimate	(Italy) Leonardo Colavita (France) Louis Stern (United Arab Emirates) Matteo Quintarelli	Nissan VK56DE 5.6 L V8	MI	61	Did not finish
	GT	42	(New Zealand) Prime Speed Sport	(Australia) Nick Foster (New Zealand) Jono Lester (New Zealand) René Heremana Malmezac	Lamborghini Huracán GT3 Evo 2	MI	46	Did not finish (Note: The No. 42 Prime Speed Sport received a drive-through penalty converted to a 25-second time penalty for abuse of track limits.)
	GT	42	(New Zealand) Prime Speed Sport	(Australia) Nick Foster (New Zealand) Jono Lester (New Zealand) René Heremana Malmezac	Lamborghini DGF 5.2 L V10	MI	46	Did not finish
	GT	77	(United Kingdom) Optimum Motorsport	(United Kingdom) Tom Ikin (Germany) Marvin Kirchhöfer (United Kingdom) Morgan Tillbrook	McLaren 720S GT3 Evo	MI	11	Did not finish
	GT	77	(United Kingdom) Optimum Motorsport	(United Kingdom) Tom Ikin (Germany) Marvin Kirchhöfer (United Kingdom) Morgan Tillbrook	McLaren M840T 4.0 L Turbo V8	MI	11	Did not finish
	GT	27	(United Kingdom) Optimum Motorsport	(United Kingdom) Andrew Gilbert (Germany) Benjamin Goethe (Spain) Fran Rueda	McLaren 720S GT3 Evo	MI	7	Did not finish
	GT	27	(United Kingdom) Optimum Motorsport	(United Kingdom) Andrew Gilbert (Germany) Benjamin Goethe (Spain) Fran Rueda	McLaren M840T 4.0 L Turbo V8	MI	7	Did not finish

=== Statistics ===
==== Fastest lap ====
Class	No.	Entrant	Driver	Time	Lap
LMP2	30	(France) RD Limited	(France) Tristan Vautier	1:47.635	102
LMP3	26	(Czech Republic) Bretton Racing	(Australia) Griffin Peebles	1:56.215	55
GT	89	(New Zealand) Earl Bamber Motorsport	(Italy) Mattia Drudi	1:58.800	86

== Notes ==
=== Race 2 ===
Asian Le Mans Series
Previous race: 4 Hours of Sepang	2024–25 season	Next race: 4 Hours of Abu Dhabi
