= 2016 Ferrari Challenge Europe =

The 2016 Ferrari Challenge – Europe was the 24th season of Ferrari Challenge Europe and its predecessor, Ferrari Challenge Italy. The season consisted of 7 rounds, starting at the Autodromo Nazionale di Monza on April 2 and ending at the Daytona International Speedway on December 3.

== Calendar ==
Rnd.	Circuit	Dates	Map
1	(Italy) Autodromo Nazionale di Monza	April 2–3	2016 Ferrari Challenge Europe is located in Europe 2016 Ferrari Challenge Europe is located in the United States
2	(Italy) Mugello Circuit	April 30–May 1	2016 Ferrari Challenge Europe is located in Europe 2016 Ferrari Challenge Europe is located in the United States
3	(France) Circuit de la Sarthe	June 18	2016 Ferrari Challenge Europe is located in Europe 2016 Ferrari Challenge Europe is located in the United States
4	(Russia) Sochi Autodrom	July 30–31	2016 Ferrari Challenge Europe is located in Europe 2016 Ferrari Challenge Europe is located in the United States
5	(Germany) Hockenheimring	September 10–11	2016 Ferrari Challenge Europe is located in Europe 2016 Ferrari Challenge Europe is located in the United States
6	(Spain) Circuito de Jerez	October 8–9	2016 Ferrari Challenge Europe is located in Europe 2016 Ferrari Challenge Europe is located in the United States
7	(United States) Daytona International Speedway	December 2–3	2016 Ferrari Challenge Europe is located in Europe 2016 Ferrari Challenge Europe is located in the United States

== Entry list ==
All teams and drivers used the Ferrari 458 Challenge Evo fitted with Pirelli tyres.

=== Trofeo Pirelli ===
Team	No.	Driver	Class	Rounds
(Switzerland) Octane126	1	(Germany) Björn Grossmann	Pro	All
(Switzerland) Octane126	42	(Turkey) Galip Atar	Pro-Am	1, 5
(Switzerland) Octane126	67	(Switzerland) James Fischer	Pro-Am	1
(Switzerland) Octane126	68	(Switzerland) Fabio Leimer	Pro	4–5, 7
Motor Service	3	(Russia) Aleksey Basov	Pro	4
Motor Service	26	(France) Cedric Mezard	Pro-Am	7
Motor Service	39	(Russia) Vladimir Atoev	Pro-Am	4, 6–7
Motor Service	58	(China) Hui-Lin Han	Pro-Am	5
Motor Service	77	(Australia) Stephen Wyatt	Pro-Am	3
(Italy) Rossocorsa	9	(Italy) Marcello Puglisi	Pro	All
(Italy) Rossocorsa	18	(United States) James Weiland	Pro-Am	4
(Italy) Rossocorsa	27	(Italy) Alessandro Vezzoni	Pro	All
(Italy) Rossocorsa	41	(France) Fréderic Jean-Marie Fangio	Pro-Am	2, 5, 7
(Italy) Rossocorsa	59	(Canada) John Farano	Pro-Am	1–4, 6–7
(Italy) Rossocorsa	71	(Russia) Roman Yakuskin	Pro-Am	1
(Italy) Rossocorsa	86	(Italy) Alberto Cola	Pro	3
(Italy) Rossocorsa	91	(Austria) Philipp Baron	Pro	All
(Italy) Rossocorsa	94	(Italy) Giuseppe Ramelli	Pro-Am	1–2
(Italy) Rossocorsa	97	(Italy) Tommaso Rocca	Pro-Am	All
(Sweden) Scuderia Autoropa	10	(Sweden) Henrik Hedman	Pro-Am	3, 5, 7
(Sweden) Scuderia Autoropa	13	(Sweden) Martin Nelson	Pro-Am	1–3, 5–7
(Sweden) Scuderia Autoropa	55	(Italy) Matteo Santoponte	Pro	1
(Denmark) Formula Racing	16	(Denmark) Niels Zibrandsen	Pro-Am	7
(Denmark) Formula Racing	19	(Denmark) Per Nielsen	Pro-Am	3, 5, 7
(San Marino) StileF Squadra Corse	22	(Spain) Álex Palou	Pro	6
(San Marino) StileF Squadra Corse	32	(Germany) Andreas Segler	Pro-Am	1–3
(San Marino) StileF Squadra Corse	74	(Switzerland) Andrea Benenati	Pro-Am	1–2, 6
(Germany) Gohm Motorsport	25	(Austria) Alexander Nußbaumer	Pro-Am	5
(Germany) Gohm Motorsport	44	(Germany) Jens Liebhauser	Pro-Am	3, 5
(Czech Republic) Scuderia Praha	37	(Czech Republic) Jan Danis	Pro; Pro-Am	1–2; 3, 5
(Switzerland) Kessel Racing	48	(Australia) Liam Talbot	Pro	3
(Switzerland) Kessel Racing	79	(Canada) Joshua Cartu	Pro-Am	7
(Switzerland) Kessel Racing	87	(Switzerland) Peter Knoflach	Pro-Am	2–3, 5
(Switzerland) Kessel Racing	99	(Belgium) Jacques Duyver	Pro-Am	7
(Italy) Ineco – MP Racing	50	(Italy) David Gostner	Pro	1–3, 5–6
(Germany) Ferrari Eberlein	51	(Germany) Walter-Ben Dörrenberg	Pro-Am	3, 5
(Austria) Baron Service	88	(Belgium) Florian Merckx	Pro	3
(United Kingdom) Stratstone Ferrari	92	(United Kingdom) Sam Smeeth	Pro-Am	All

=== Coppa Shell ===
Team	Driver	Class	Rounds
(Austria) Baron Service	(Sweden) Thomas Lindroth	Am	All
(Italy) CDP	(Italy) Leonardo Baccarelli	Am	1–2
(Italy) CDP	(Italy) Renato di Amato	Am	1, 3, 6–7
(United States) Ferrari of Newport Beach	(United States) Alan Hegyi	Am	1–3
(Germany) Gohm Motorsport	(Switzerland) Klaus Hrubesch	Am	3
(Germany) Gohm Motorsport	(Sweden) Christian Kinch	Am	All
(Italy) Ineco – MP Racing	(Italy) Corinna Gostner	Am	1–3, 5–7
(Italy) Ineco – MP Racing	(Italy) Manuela Gostner	Am	1–3, 5–7
(Italy) Ineco – MP Racing	(Italy) Thomas Gostner	Am	1–3, 5–7
(Italy) Ineco – MP Racing	(Italy) Erich Prinoth	Am	1–3, 5–7
(Switzerland) Kessel Racing	(Turkey) Murat Cuhadaroğlu	Am	1–6
(Switzerland) Kessel Racing	(Switzerland) Daniel Künzli	Am	1–2
(Switzerland) Kessel Racing	(Canada) Rick Lovat	Am	1–5, 7
(Switzerland) Kessel Racing	(Netherlands) Fons Scheltema	Am	All
(Germany) Lüg Sportivo	(Germany) Holger Harmsen	Am	1, 5–7
Motor Service	(Hong Kong) Eric Cheung	Am	1–6
Motor Service	(Lebanon) Tani Hanna	Am	1–3, 7
Motor Service	(Russia) Gary Kondakov	Am	1
Motor Service	(Greece) Kriton Lendoudis	Am	1, 3–7
Motor Service	(United States) Michael Luzich	Am	2, 4
(Italy) Rossocorsa	(United States) Jean-Claude Saada	Am	1–3, 5
(Italy) Rossocorsa	(United States) Frank Selldorff	Am	7
(Sweden) Scuderia Autoropa	(Sweden) Ingvar Mattsson	Am	2, 6–7
(Sweden) Scuderia Autoropa	(Sweden) Roger Samuelsson	Am	3
(Sweden) Scuderia Autoropa	(Sweden) Alexander West	Am	2
(Switzerland) Scuderia Niki Hasler	(France) Deborah Mayer	Am	All
(Switzerland) Scuderia Niki Hasler	(Italy) Claudio Schiavoni	Am	All
(Czech Republic) Scuderia Praha	(Czech Republic) Vladimir Hladik	Am	3, 5–7
(Czech Republic) Scuderia Praha	(Czech Republic) Dušan Palcr	Am	3
(San Marino) StileF Squadra Corsa	(Germany) Thomas Löfflad	Am	All
(United Kingdom) Stratstone Ferrari	(United Kingdom) Wayne Marrs	Am	1–3

== Results and standings ==
=== Race results ===
Round	Race	Circuit	Pole position	Fastest lap	Trofeo Pirelli Winners	Coppa Shell Winners
1	1	(Italy) Autodromo Nazionale di Monza	TP Pro: (Italy) Matteo Santoponte; TP Pro-Am: (United Kingdom) Sam Smeeth; CS Am: (Germany) Thomas Löfflad	TP Pro: (Austria) Philipp Baron; TP Pro-Am: (United Kingdom) Sam Smeeth; CS Am: (Germany) Thomas Löfflad	Pro: (Italy) Matteo Santoponte; Scuderia Autoropa; Pro-Am: (Sweden) Martin Nelson; Scuderia Autoropa	Am: (Germany) Thomas Löfflad; StileF Squadra Corse
1	2	(Italy) Autodromo Nazionale di Monza	TP Pro: (Austria) Philipp Baron; TP Pro-Am: (United Kingdom) Sam Smeeth; CS Am: (Germany) Thomas Löfflad	TP Pro: (Austria) Philipp Baron; TP Pro-Am: (United Kingdom) Sam Smeeth; CS Am: (Germany) Thomas Löfflad	Pro: (Austria) Philipp Baron; Rossocorsa; Pro-Am: (United Kingdom) Sam Smeeth; Stratstone Ferrari	Am: (Germany) Thomas Löfflad; StileF Squadra Corse
2	1	(Italy) Mugello Circuit	TP Pro: (Germany) Björn Grossmann; TP Pro-Am: (United Kingdom) Sam Smeeth; CS Am: (Italy) Erich Prinoth	TP Pro: (Germany) Björn Grossmann; TP Pro-Am: (United Kingdom) Sam Smeeth; CS Am: (Germany) Thomas Löfflad	Pro: (Germany) Björn Grossmann; Octane126; Pro-Am: (United Kingdom) Sam Smeeth; Stratstone Ferrari	Am: (Italy) Erich Prinoth; Ineco – MP Racing
2	2	(Italy) Mugello Circuit	TP Pro: (Germany) Björn Grossmann; TP Pro-Am: (United Kingdom) Sam Smeeth; CS Am: (Lebanon) Tani Hanna	TP Pro: (Germany) Björn Grossmann; TP Pro-Am: (United Kingdom) Sam Smeeth; CS Am: (Germany) Thomas Löfflad	Pro: (Germany) Björn Grossmann; Octane126; Pro-Am: (United Kingdom) Sam Smeeth; Stratstone Ferrari	Am: (Germany) Thomas Löfflad; StileF Squadra Corse
3	1	(France) Circuit de la Sarthe	TP Pro: (Italy) Alberto Cola; TP Pro-Am: (United Kingdom) Sam Smeeth; CS Am: (Lebanon) Tani Hanna	TP Pro: (Italy) David Gostner; TP Pro-Am: (United Kingdom) Sam Smeeth; CS Am: (Italy) Erich Prinoth	Pro: (Italy) Marcello Puglisi; Rossocorsa; Pro-Am: (United Kingdom) Sam Smeeth; Stratstone Ferrari	Am: (Czech Republic) Vladimir Hladik; Scuderia Praha
4	1	(Russia) Sochi Autodrom	TP Pro: (Switzerland) Fabio Leimer; TP Pro-Am: (United Kingdom) Sam Smeeth; CS Am: (Germany) Thomas Löfflad	TP Pro: (Germany) Björn Grossmann; TP Pro-Am: (Russia) Vladimir Atoev; CS Am: (Canada) Rick Lovat	Pro: (Germany) Björn Grossmann; Octane126; Pro-Am: (Russia) Vladimir Atoev; Motor Service	Am: (Netherlands) Fons Scheltema; Kessel Racing
4	2	(Russia) Sochi Autodrom	TP Pro: (Germany) Björn Grossmann; TP Pro-Am: (United Kingdom) Sam Smeeth; CS Am: (Germany) Thomas Löfflad	TP Pro: (Germany) Björn Grossmann; TP Pro-Am: (Russia) Vladimir Atoev; CS Am: (Italy) Claudio Schiavoni	Pro: (Germany) Björn Grossmann; Octane126; Pro-Am: (Russia) Vladimir Atoev; Motor Service	Am: (Germany) Thomas Löfflad; StileF Squadra Corse
5	1	(Germany) Hockenheimring	TP Pro: (Switzerland) Fabio Leimer; TP Pro-Am: (United Kingdom) Sam Smeeth; CS Am: (Canada) Rick Lovat	TP Pro: (Switzerland) Fabio Leimer; TP Pro-Am: (United Kingdom) Sam Smeeth; CS Am: (Canada) Rick Lovat	Pro: (Switzerland) Fabio Leimer; Octane126; Pro-Am: (United Kingdom) Sam Smeeth; Stratstone Ferrari	Am: (Canada) Rick Lovat; Kessel Racing
5	2	(Germany) Hockenheimring	TP Pro: (Switzerland) Fabio Leimer; TP Pro-Am: (United Kingdom) Sam Smeeth; CS Am: (Canada) Rick Lovat	TP Pro: (Switzerland) Fabio Leimer; TP Pro-Am: (United Kingdom) Sam Smeeth; CS Am: (Canada) Rick Lovat	Pro: (Germany) Björn Grossmann; Octane126; Pro-Am: (United Kingdom) Sam Smeeth; Stratstone Ferrari	Am: (Canada) Rick Lovat; Kessel Racing
6	1	(Spain) Circuito de Jerez	TP Pro: (Spain) Álex Palou; TP Pro-Am: (United Kingdom) Sam Smeeth; CS Am: (Netherlands) Fons Scheltema	TP Pro: (Germany) Björn Grossmann; TP Pro-Am: (United Kingdom) Sam Smeeth; CS Am: (Czech Republic) Vladimir Hladik	Pro: (Germany) Björn Grossmann; Octane126; Pro-Am: (United Kingdom) Sam Smeeth; Stratstone Ferrari	Am: (Italy) Erich Prinoth; Ineco – MP Racing
6	2	(Spain) Circuito de Jerez	TP Pro: (Spain) Álex Palou; TP Pro-Am: (Russia) Vladimir Atoev; CS Am: (Germany) Thomas Löfflad	TP Pro: (Spain) Álex Palou; TP Pro-Am: (United Kingdom) Sam Smeeth; CS Am: (Germany) Thomas Löfflad	Pro: (Spain) Álex Palou; StileF Squadra Corse; Pro-Am: (United Kingdom) Sam Smeeth; Stratstone Ferrari	Am: (Germany) Thomas Löfflad; StileF Squadra Corse
7	1	(United States) Daytona International Speedway	TP Pro: (Switzerland) Fabio Leimer; TP Pro-Am: (United Kingdom) Sam Smeeth; CS Am: (Canada) Rick Lovat	TP Pro: (Austria) Philipp Baron; TP Pro-Am: (United Kingdom) Sam Smeeth; CS Am: (Germany) Thomas Löfflad	Pro: (Austria) Philipp Baron; Rossocorsa; Pro-Am: (United Kingdom) Sam Smeeth; Stratstone Ferrari	Am: (Germany) Thomas Löfflad; StileF Squadra Corse
7	2	(United States) Daytona International Speedway	TP Pro: (Germany) Björn Grossmann; TP Pro-Am: (Russia) Vladimir Atoev; CS Am: (Canada) Rick Lovat	TP Pro: (Germany) Björn Grossmann; TP Pro-Am: (United Kingdom) Sam Smeeth; CS Am: (Italy) Erich Prinoth	Pro: (Germany) Björn Grossmann; Octane126; Pro-Am: (United Kingdom) Sam Smeeth; Stratstone Ferrari	Am: (Canada) Rick Lovat; Kessel Racing

=== Championship standings ===
Points were awarded to the top ten classified finishers as follows:

Race Position	1st	2nd	3rd	4th	5th	6th	7th	8th	9th	10th	Pole	FLap	Start
Points	20	15	12	10	8	6	4	3	2	1	1	1	1

Trofeo Pirelli

Pos.	Driver	(Italy) MNZ		(Italy) MUG		(France) LMS	(Russia) SOC		(Germany) HOC		(Spain) JER		(United States) DAY		Points
Pos.	Driver	R1	R2	R1	R2	R	R1	R2	R1	R2	R1	R2	R1	R2	Points
Pro Class
1	(Germany) Björn Grossmann	3	6	1	1	2	1	1	2	1	1	3	3	1	234
2	(Austria) Philipp Baron	2	1	4	2	5	4	3	3	3	5	2	1	DNS	170
3	(Italy) Marcello Puglisi	Ret	3	2	3	1	5	4	5	5	4	4	2	Ret	145
4	(Italy) Alessandro Vezzoni	5	7	5	4	3	6	6	4	4	3	5	4	3	126
5	(Switzerland) Fabio Leimer						2	2	1	2			DNS	2	89
6	(Italy) David Gostner	4	4	3	5	4			6	DNS	DNS	DNS			64
7	(Spain) Álex Palou										2	1			39
8	(Italy) Matteo Santoponte	1	2												37
9	(Czech Republic) Jan Danis	6	5	Ret	6										26
10	(Russia) Aleksey Basov						3	5							21
11	(Australia) Liam Talbot					6									9
12	(Italy) Alberto Cola					Ret									8
13	(Belgium) Florian Merckx					Ret									1
Pro-Am Class
1	(United Kingdom) Sam Smeeth	2	1	1	1	1	2	5	1	1	1	1	1	1	278
2	(Italy) Tommasco Rocca	4	10	3	3	Ret	4	2	3	4	5	5	4	8	118
3	(Canada) John Farano	8	4	2	4	10	3	4			3	4	3	2	117
4	(Sweden) Martin Nelson	1	2	9	2	9			Ret	3	4	3	Ret	4	105
5	(Russia) Vladimir Atoev						1	1			2	2	Ret	Ret	76
6	(Sweden) Henrik Hedman					3			2	2			2	3	75
7	(Switzerland) Andrea Benenati	3	6	5	Ret						6	6			41
8	(Czech Republic) Jan Danis					4			Ret	DNS					40
9	(Germany) Andreas Segler	7	3	4	5	Ret									37
10	(Switzerland) Peter Knoflach			6	6	5			7	8					32
11	(Denmark) Per Nielsen					6			6	7			10	10	23
12	(Australia) Stephen Wyatt					2									21
=	(United States) James Weiland						5	3							21
14	(France) Fréderic Jean-Marie Fangio			7	7				8	10			7	11	19
15	(Switzerland) James Fischer	5	5												18
16	(Belgium) Jacques Duyver												6	5	15
=	(Austria) Alexander Nußbaumer								5	6					15
=	(Germany) Walter-Ben Dörrenberg					7			9	11					15
19	(Germany) Jens Liebhauser					8			Ret	5					14
20	(Italy) Giuseppe Ramelli	Ret	7	8	8										12
21	(China) Hui-Lin Han								4	Ret					11
=	(France) Cedric Mezard												5	9	11
23	(Russia) Roman Yakuskin	6	9												9
=	(Denmark) Niels Zibrandsen												9	6	9
25	(Canada) Joshua Cartu												8	7	8
26	(Turkey) Galip Atar	Ret	8						Ret	9					7

Coppa Shell

Pos.	Driver	(Italy) MNZ		(Italy) MUG		(France) LMS	(Russia) SOC		(Germany) HOC		(Spain) JER		(United States) DAY		Points
Pos.	Driver	R1	R2	R1	R2	R	R1	R2	R1	R2	R1	R2	R1	R2	Points
Am Class
1	(Germany) Thomas Löfflad	1	1	2	1	2	6	1	2	Ret	9	1	1	DNS	196
2	(Canada) Rick Lovat	3	4	11	6	5	2	2	1	1			2	1	156
3	(Netherlands) Fons Scheltema	2	5	3	12	3	1	5	4	4	Ret	3	11	3	130
4	(Italy) Erich Prinoth	Ret	2	1	3	6			3	2	1	DNS	5	4	129
5	(Czech Republic) Vladimir Hladik					1			7	5	3	4	3	2	96
6	(Italy) Renato di Amato	4	3			4					12	2	7	7	61
7	(Hong Kong) Eric Cheung	9	12	5	5	8	7	3	6	Ret	Ret	Ret			50
8	(Italy) Claudio Schiavoni	Ret	Ret	14	13	11	4	9	9	Ret	2	5	15	8	48
=	(Sweden) Thomas Lindroth	7	7	7	7	10	5	6	8	7	10	Ret	10	14	48
10	(Lebanon) Tani Hanna	5	6	Ret	2	22							4	15	45
11	(Greece) Kriton Lendoudis	12	13			9	3	4	5	9	8	Ret	Ret	12	44
12	(Sweden) Christian Kinch	14	8	10	8	13	8	8	10	10	5	8	12	9	35
13	(Italy) Thomas Gostner	Ret	DNS	13	9	7			13	8	15	9	6	6	31
14	(United States) Jean-Claude Saada	8	Ret	4	Ret	23			12	3					29
15	(Germany) Holger Harmsen	Ret	11						11	6	6	6	9	13	24
16	(Italy) Corinna Gostner	Ret	15	12	11	14					4	7	Ret	Ret	20
17	(Turkey) Murat Cuhadaroğlu	Ret	16	8	Ret	18	9	7	Ret	12	7	12			19
18	(Italy) Leonardo Baccarelli	10	Ret	9	4										15
19	(Sweden) Ingvar Mattsson			Ret	DNS						13	10	14	5	12
20	(United Kingdom) Wayne Marrs	6	10	17	19	12									10
21	(Italy) Manuela Gostner	Ret	9	16	14	21			15	11	11	Ret	13	10	9
22	(France) Deborah Mayer	11	17	19	17	17	10	11	14	13	14	11	Ret	16	8
23	(Sweden) Alexander West			6	18										7
24	(United States) Frank Selldorff												8	11	4
25	(United States) Michael Luzich			18	15		11	10							3
=	(Switzerland) Daniel Künzli	13	14	15	10										3
=	(United States) Alan Hegyi	16	19	20	16	19									3
28	(Czech Republic) Dušan Palcr					15									2
29	(Russia) Gary Kondakov	15	18												1
=	(Switzerland) Klaus Hrubesch					16									1
NC	(Sweden) Roger Samuelsson					20									0

== See also ==
- 2016 Finali Mondiali
