= 2015 SMP F4 Championship =

Motor racing competition

Seasons
- ← none 2016 →

The 2015 SMP F4 Championship season in motorsport, was the inaugural season of the SMP F4 Championship, a racing series regulated according to FIA Formula 4 regulations. It was a motor racing series for the North European Zone (NEZ) held in Estonia, Finland and Russia. The 2015 season began on 16 May at Ahvenisto in Finland and finished on 3 October at the auto24ring in Estonia, after seven triple header rounds.

The series' inaugural champion was Finnish driver Niko Kari in his first season of car racing. Kari took seven overall wins (including a weekend sweep at Moscow Raceway) during the 2015 season, but also added five class victories behind British driver Enaam Ahmed – who was ineligible to score championship points – for a total of twelve during the season. Kari finished over 150 points clear of his next closest rival, Vladimir Atoev; Atoev won three races, all coming on the same weekend at Alastaro. Third place in the championship was settled in the final race in Estonia; Nerses Isaakyan took five runner-up positions in six races which allowed him to overhaul Aleksanteri Huovinen in the championship standings. Huovinen was another three-time race winner; winning twice at Ahvenisto and once at Moscow Raceway. Two other drivers won races in 2015 as Aleksey Korneev won races at Moscow Raceway and Sochi, while Nikita Troitskiy won the third race at Ahvenisto; the drivers finished fifth and sixth in the drivers' championship.

== Drivers ==
No.	Driver	Rounds
2	(Russia) Ivan Matveev	All
3	(Sweden) Joel Eriksson	1
5	(Finland) Niko Kari	All
7	(Russia) Nikita Troitskiy	1–4, 6–7
10	(Russia) Vladimir Atoev	All
12	(Finland) Aleksanteri Huovinen	All
14	(Finland) Simo Laaksonen	3–4, 6–7
17	(Russia) Nerses Isaakyan	All
21	(Russia) Aleksey Korneev	All
23	(Finland) Niclas Nylund	All
29	(Russia) Denis Mavlanov	1–5, 7
32	(Georgia (country)) Roman Lebedev	6
34	(Russia) Nikita Sitnikov	All
41	(Russia) Aleksandr Vartanyan	5–6
65	(United Kingdom) Enaam Ahmed	1, 3–5, 7
71	(Russia) Semen Evstigneev	1, 3–7
77	(Russia) Aleksandr Maslennikov	All
96	(Russia) Artem Kabakov	1–3

== Race calendar and results ==
The round at Moscow Raceway, held over 5–7 June, was a support event to the FIA WTCC Race of Russia. The original scheduled final meeting was scheduled to be held over 18–20 September at Sochi Autodrom, but was first postponed to 2–3 October and later moved to the Auto24ring.

Round		Circuit, location	Date	Pole position	Fastest lap	Winning driver
1	R1	(Finland) Ahvenisto Race Circuit, Hämeenlinna	16 May	(Russia) Vladimir Atoev	(Finland) Niko Kari	(Finland) Aleksanteri Huovinen
1	R2	(Finland) Ahvenisto Race Circuit, Hämeenlinna	17 May		(Finland) Aleksanteri Huovinen	(Finland) Aleksanteri Huovinen
1	R3	(Finland) Ahvenisto Race Circuit, Hämeenlinna	17 May	(Russia) Vladimir Atoev	(Finland) Niko Kari	(Russia) Nikita Troitskiy
2	R4	(Russia) Moscow Raceway, Volokolamsk	6 June	(Russia) Aleksey Korneev	(Finland) Aleksanteri Huovinen	(Finland) Aleksanteri Huovinen
2	R5	(Russia) Moscow Raceway, Volokolamsk	7 June		(Finland) Niko Kari	(Finland) Niko Kari
2	R6	(Russia) Moscow Raceway, Volokolamsk	7 June	(Russia) Aleksey Korneev	(Russia) Aleksey Korneev	(Russia) Aleksey Korneev
3	R7	(Russia) Sochi Autodrom, Sochi	20 June	(Finland) Niko Kari	(Russia) Vladimir Atoev	(Finland) Niko Kari
3	R8	(Russia) Sochi Autodrom, Sochi	21 June		(Finland) Niko Kari	(Finland) Niko Kari
3	R9	(Russia) Sochi Autodrom, Sochi	21 June	(Finland) Niko Kari	(Finland) Niko Kari	(Russia) Aleksey Korneev
4	R10	(Finland) Alastaro Circuit, Loimaa	15 August	(Russia) Vladimir Atoev	(Russia) Vladimir Atoev	(Russia) Vladimir Atoev
4	R11	(Finland) Alastaro Circuit, Loimaa	16 August		(Russia) Vladimir Atoev	(Russia) Vladimir Atoev
4	R12	(Finland) Alastaro Circuit, Loimaa	16 August	(Russia) Vladimir Atoev	(Russia) Nerses Isaakyan	(Russia) Vladimir Atoev
5	R13	(Estonia) Auto24ring, Audru	29 August	(Finland) Niko Kari	(Russia) Vladimir Atoev	(United Kingdom) Enaam Ahmed
5	R14	(Estonia) Auto24ring, Audru	29 August		(Finland) Niclas Nylund	(United Kingdom) Enaam Ahmed
5	R15	(Estonia) Auto24ring, Audru	29 August	(Finland) Niko Kari	(Russia) Nerses Isaakyan	(Finland) Niko Kari
6	R16	(Russia) Moscow Raceway, Volokolamsk	5 September	(Russia) Nerses Isaakyan	(Finland) Niko Kari	(Finland) Niko Kari
6	R17	(Russia) Moscow Raceway, Volokolamsk	6 September		(Finland) Niko Kari	(Finland) Niko Kari
6	R18	(Russia) Moscow Raceway, Volokolamsk	6 September	(Russia) Nerses Isaakyan	(Finland) Niko Kari	(Finland) Niko Kari
7	R19	(Estonia) Auto24ring, Audru	3 October	(United Kingdom) Enaam Ahmed	(Finland) Niko Kari	(United Kingdom) Enaam Ahmed
7	R20	(Estonia) Auto24ring, Audru	3 October		(Russia) Nikita Troitskiy	(United Kingdom) Enaam Ahmed
7	R21	(Estonia) Auto24ring, Audru	3 October	(United Kingdom) Enaam Ahmed	(Russia) Vladimir Atoev	(United Kingdom) Enaam Ahmed

== Championship standings ==
Pos	Driver	AHV (Finland)			MSC (Russia)			SOC (Russia)			ALA (Finland)			AUD (Estonia)			MSC (Russia)			AUD (Estonia)			Pts
1	(Finland) Niko Kari	2	Ret	2	2	1	2	**1**	1	**4**	2	2	2	**2**	2	**1**	1	1	1	2	2	2	449
2	(Russia) Vladimir Atoev	**3**	2	**4**	3	5	8	3	3	8	**1**	1	**1**	5	3	2	10	5	10	4	3	5	296
3	(Russia) Nerses Isaakyan	4	13†	5	5	4	6	7	8	3	3	Ret	4	6	Ret	5	**2**	2	**2**	3	5	3	234
4	(Finland) Aleksanteri Huovinen	1	1	6	1	2	3	4	Ret	12	7	6	9	7	4	8	6	4	5	5	8	11	229
5	(Russia) Aleksey Korneev	10	Ret	7	**NC**	7	**1**	2	2	1	4	3	7	8	5	4	9	Ret	6	11	9	6	191
6	(Russia) Nikita Troitskiy	Ret	6	1	Ret	6	5	DNS	6	2	8	Ret	12				5	3	3	10	4	9	149
7	(Finland) Niclas Nylund	Ret	9	8	9	Ret	4	5	5	6	6	4	8	3	7	Ret	3	13†	4	13	10	Ret	136
8	(Russia) Ivan Matveev	6	5	13†	10	10	10	8	7	5	9	Ret	5	4	6	3	13	9	7	6	6	Ret	131
9	(Russia) Nikita Sitnikov	8	7	14†	4	3	7	12	Ret	7	13	Ret	10	10	10	7	12	6	9	9	7	4	104
10	(Russia) Aleksandr Maslennikov	9	8	10	6	9	9	10	Ret	Ret	10	7	Ret	9	9	12†	7	7	Ret	8	Ret	8	66
11	(Finland) Simo Laaksonen							6	10	Ret	11	5	6				8	8	8	7	11	7	60
12	(Sweden) Joel Eriksson	12	4	3																			30
13	(Russia) Artem Kabakov	7	10	Ret	7	8	11	14	11†	Ret													21
14	(Russia) Denis Mavlanov	11	12	12	8	11	DSQ	11	9	10	14	8	11	12	12	11				12	12	10	20
15	(Russia) Aleksandr Vartanyan													11	11	10	4	10	11				17
16	(Russia) Semen Evstigneev	Ret	11	11				13	Ret	11	12	Ret	Ret	13	8	9	11	11	13†	14	Ret	DSQ	13
**Drivers with non-NEZ licence ineligible for championship points**
-	(United Kingdom) Enaam Ahmed	5	3	9				9	4	9	5	9†	3	1	1	6				**1**	1	**1**	0
-	(Georgia (country)) Roman Lebedev																14	12	12				0
Pos	Driver	AHV (Finland)			MSC (Russia)			SOC (Russia)			ALA (Finland)			AUD (Estonia)			MSC (Russia)			AUD (Estonia)			Pts

Colour	Result
Gold	Winner
Silver	Second place
Bronze	Third place
Green	Points classification
Blue	Non-points classification
Blue	Non-classified finish (NC)
Purple	Retired, not classified (Ret)
Red	Did not qualify (DNQ)
Red	Did not pre-qualify (DNPQ)
Black	Disqualified (DSQ)
White	Did not start (DNS)
White	Withdrew (WD)
White	Race cancelled (C)
Blank	Did not practice (DNP)
Blank	Did not arrive (DNA)
Blank	Excluded (EX)

**Bold** – Pole
Italics – Fastest Lap
