= Kriton Lendoudis =

Greek racing driver (born 1959)

- Lendoudis at Silverstone Circuit in 2026.
- Nationality: (Greece) Greek
- Born: 28 December 1959 (age 66) Greece

European Le Mans Series career
- Debut season: 2023
- Current team: Nielsen Racing
- Categorisation: FIA Bronze
- Car number: 20
- Former teams: AF Corse, Algarve Pro Racing
- Starts: 12 (12 entries)
- Wins: 1
- Podiums: 4
- Poles: 0
- Fastest laps: 0
- Best finish: 2nd (LMP2 Pro-Am) in 2024

Kriton Lendoudis (Greek: Κρίτων Λεντούδης, born 28 December 1959), sometimes spelled Kriton Lentoudis, is a Greek businessman and amateur racing driver. He currently competes in the LMP2 Pro-Am class of the European Le Mans Series for Nielsen Racing, having previously been a presence in historic racing.

== Racing career ==
=== Beginnings in historic racing ===
Lendoudis made his known racing debut in 2014: having bought a Porsche 956C at auction, Lendoudis began taking part in the Group C Racing Championship. Having finished 11th at Spa-Francorchamps and 13th at Le Mans, he withdrew from the Silverstone round due to an engine failure at the Goodwood Festival of Speed. Before the Le Castellet event, Lendoudis bought a Mercedes-Benz C11 and drove it alongside Gareth Evans, who helped him score his maiden C1 class podium with a third place. In addition, Lendoudis partook in a round of the Ferrari Challenge Europe as well as the end-of-year Finali Mondiali race that year.

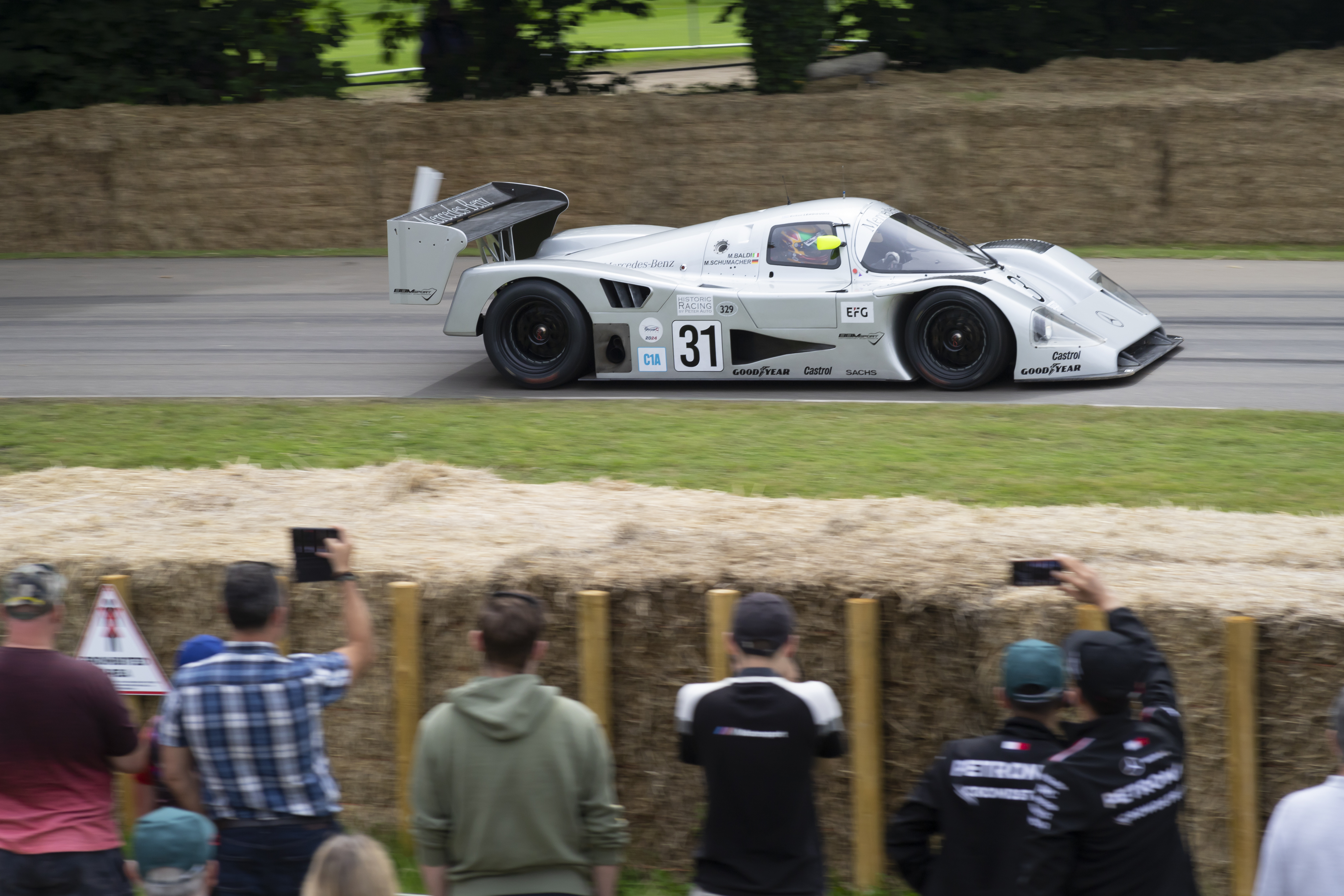
1990 Mercedes-Benz C11 at the 2024 Goodwood Festival of Speed, entered by Lendoudis and driven by Nicolas Minassian.

Lendoudis embarked on a full-time campaign in the series with AF Corse in 2015, finishing 17th in the Coppa Shell class. He also drove his C11 in the Group C Racing Championship alongside Rui Águas. At the opening round in Barcelona, Lendoudis finished third overall in race 2. Another third place in the overall classification followed at Spa, as Lendoudis finished third in the C1 class standings. In addition, Lendoudis was featured in Ferrari's F1 Clienti programme that year, as part of which he drove a Ferrari F1-2000 around the Imola Circuit. In 2016, the Greek driver scored his first podium in the Ferrari Challenge series and ended up 11th overall. He also scored a class podium in the 12 Hours of Mugello, driving for Tsunami RT alongside Côme Ledogar and Oleksander Gaidai.

After winning the Group C Racing Championship in the C1 class during the 2017 season, Lendoudis made a switch to GT3 machinery the following year by competing for Black Falcon in the Pro-Am category of the Blancpain GT Series Endurance Cup. He, Águas, and Saud Al Faisal took a subclass podium at Le Castellet and finished fifth in the Pro-Am championship. Lendoudis continued to race and win in historic competitions during 2018 and 2019, driving a Peugeot 908 HDi FAP.

=== Le Mans Cup ===
During 2019, Lendoudis made his Le Mans Cup debut, driving in the 24 Hours of Le Mans support race called Road to Le Mans. He and Rui Águas finished the opening race of the weekend sixth within the GT3 class.

After a year of absence during the COVID-19 pandemic, Lendoudis entered into the LMP3 prototype class of the Le Mans Cup in 2021, partnering Águas at AF Corse. They scored a best finish of eighth and finished 19th in the teams' standings. The pair returned in 2022 but failed to score any points during their four races. During this time, Lendoudis raced his Peugeot 908 in historic events, winning race 1 at Le Castellet in 2021 and coming close to victory at Barcelona in April 2022.

=== European and Asian Le Mans Series ===
Lendoudis and Águas moved to the European Le Mans Series in 2023, entering the final year of the LMGTE class at AF Corse alongside Ulysse de Pauw. Though the trio finished all but one race in the points, their efforts were only enough for eighth place in the teams' championship. In the historic race at Spa meanwhile, Lendoudis won race 2 whilst piloting his Mercedes C11.

For the 2024 ELMS season, Lendoudis moved up to the LMP2 class with Algarve Pro Racing, racing in the Pro-Am category together with former Le Mans class winner Richard Bradley and young pro Alex Quinn. After two races where they finished off the podium, the No. 20 APR trio benefited from good strategy at Imola to take victory. With Lendoudis remaining clean throughout the next few races, the team extended their podium streak by finishing third at Spa and second at Mugello to set up a final-round title decider. The team decided to gamble during the final stint, leaving Quinn out of the pits and forcing him to stretch his fuel all the way to the end. They led the race until the final lap, when a slowing Quinn was eventually caught by Bent Viscaal, demoting the No. 20 APR crew to second in the race and the Pro-Am championship.

In the winter of 2024, Lendoudis partnered Quinn and Olli Caldwell at APR in the Asian Le Mans Series. After finishing third in race 2 at Sepang and race 1 in Dubai, Lendoudis celebrated victory in Dubai race 2 thanks in part to a standout performance by Quinn. A fuel strategy gamble in race 1 at Yas Marina yielded a second place, but a technical issue on Sunday meant that the #20 APR crew dropped to fourth in the final standings.

Alongside Quinn and Caldwell, Lendoudis returned to contest the 2025 ELMS season in Algarve Pro's #20 car. They finished second in the Barcelona season opener and ended up sixth in Le Castellet. A red-flagged Imola event saw the APR crew battle for the lead in the middle stages of the race, before they eventually claimed third place. With a victory at the 4 Hours of Spa-Francorchamps in August, Lendoudis and his teammates ascended to the lead of the Pro-Am championship. However, contact at the final round caused the team to drop to second in the Pro-Am standings.

Lendoudis continued to make appearances in historic racing, winning race 2 at Spa in the Endurance Racing Legends series in 2025 at the wheel of a Mercedes C11.

It was announced in November 2025 that Lendoudis would race a wingless Peugeot 9X8 Hypercar in the 2026–27 Asian Le Mans Series season after acquiring one of the cars. He also signed on for a season in the 2025–26 Asian Le Mans Series, partnering Quinn and Cem Bölükbaşı at Nielsen Racing.

== Business career and personal life ==
Lendoudis is the owner of Evalend Shipping, having inherited the company upon his father Evangelos's death in 1984. At the 2023 Greek Shipping Awards, Lendoudis was named the "Newsmaker of the Year" thanks to his high amount of newbuilding contracts. As of 2024, his company owned 21 vessels worth a combined $2.1bn USD.

As part of his personal fortune, Lendoudis owns a collection of expensive cars worth approximately 15 million euros in 2013. This includes the Mercedes 300 D driven by Pope Paul VI, a Ferrari F40 (built for Lendoudis's son Agnieli; it is the only F40 built without a clutch), and ten different Lamborghini models including an award-winning Lamborghini Miura SV.

== Racing record ==
=== Racing career summary ===
Season	Series	Team	Races	Wins	Poles	F/Laps	Podiums	Points	Position
2014	Group C Racing Championship Class 1		3	0	0	0	1	19	18th
2014	Ferrari Challenge Europe - Coppa Shell	Motor Piacenza	2	0	0	0	0	1	23rd
2014	Finali Mondiali - Coppa Shell	Motor Piacenza	1	0	0	0	0	N/A	NC
2015	Ferrari Challenge Europe - Coppa Shell	AF Corse	12	0	0	0	0	15	17th
2015	Finali Mondiali - Coppa Shell	AF Corse	1	0	0	0	0	N/A	5th
2015	Group C Racing Championship Class 1		4	0	0	0	2	52	**3rd**
2015	Salvadori Cup		1	0	0	0	0	N/A	17th
2016	Ferrari Challenge Europe - Coppa Shell	Motor Service	11	0	0	0	1	44	11th
2016	Finali Mondiali - Coppa Shell	EU GTL Motor Service	1	0	0	0	0	N/A	13th
2016	Group C Racing Series Class 1		1	1	1	1	1	31	21st
2016	24H Series - SP3	JR Motorsport	1	0	0	0	0	0	NC†
2016	24H Series - 991	Tsunami RT	1	0	0	0	1	0	NC†
2017	Blancpain GT Series Endurance Cup - Pro-Am	Team Zakspeed	2	0	0	0	0	0	NC
2017	Group C Racing - C1		14	7	4	2	11	328	**1st**
2017	Classic Endurance Racing - GT2		1	0	0	0	0	11	19th
2018	Blancpain GT Series Endurance Cup - Pro-Am	Black Falcon	5	0	0	0	1	51	5th
2018	24H GT Series - Championship of the Continents - A6	Black Falcon	1	0	0	0	0	0	NC
2018	24H Proto Series - Championship of the Continents - P3	Spirit of Race	3	0	0	0	3	37	**3rd**
2018	Group C Racing - C1		2	1	1	1	2	56	15th
2018	Masters Endurance Legends		3	0	0	0	2	0	NC†
2019	Le Mans Cup - GT3	Spirit of Race	2	0	0	0	0	0	NC†
2019	Blancpain GT Sports Club	AF Corse	2	0	0	0	0	1	23rd
2019	Endurance Racing Legends GT1B		4	4	2	0	4	18	7th
2019	Group C Racing - C1		4	2	1	0	2	93	6th
2021	Le Mans Cup - LMP3	AF Corse	5	0	0	0	0	6	25th
2022	Le Mans Cup - LMP3	AF Corse	4	0	0	0	0	0	NC
2023	European Le Mans Series - LMGTE	AF Corse	6	0	0	0	0	35	8th
2023	Gulf 12 Hours - Am	AF Corse	1	0	0	0	0	N/A	DNF
2023	Endurance Racing Legends - GT1B		6	1	0	0	3	100	4th
2024	European Le Mans Series - LMP2 Pro-Am	Algarve Pro Racing	6	1	0	0	4	96	**2nd**
2024	Endurance Racing Legends - GT1B		4	0	0	0	1	88	6th
2024	Group C Racing - C1a		3	2	0	2	3	43	**2nd**
2024-25	Asian Le Mans Series - LMP2	Algarve Pro Racing	6	1	0	0	4	83	4th
2025	European Le Mans Series - LMP2 Pro-Am	Algarve Pro Racing	6	2	0	0	4	95	**2nd**
2025	Endurance Racing Legends - Group C		4	1	?	?	?	95	4th
2025–26	Asian Le Mans Series - LMP2	Nielsen Racing	6	0	0	0	0	28	9th
2026	European Le Mans Series - LMP2 Pro-Am	Nielsen Racing	6	1	0	0	1	34	10th
2026	Legends of Le Mans Series - LMP1	BBM Sport							

^{†} As Lendoudis was a guest driver, he was ineligible to score points. ^{*} Season still in progress.

=== Complete Le Mans Cup results ===
(key) (Races in bold indicate pole position; results in italics indicate fastest lap)

Year	Entrant	Class	Chassis	1	2	3	4	5	6	7	Rank	Points
2019	Spirit of Race	GT3	Ferrari 488 GT3	LEC	MNZ	LMS; 1; 6	LMS; 2; 10	CAT	SPA	ALG	NC†	0
2021	AF Corse	LMP3	Ligier JS P320	CAT; 20	LEC; 17	MNZ; 9	LMS; 1	LMS; 2	SPA; 16	ALG; 20	25th	6
2022	AF Corse	LMP3	Ligier JS P320	LEC; 26	IMO; Ret	LMS; 1	LMS; 2	MNZ	SPA; 12	ALG; 24	NC	0

=== Complete European Le Mans Series results ===
(key) (Races in bold indicate pole position; results in italics indicate fastest lap)

Year	Entrant	Class	Chassis	Engine	1	2	3	4	5	6	Rank	Points
2023	AF Corse	LMGTE	Ferrari 488 GTE Evo	Ferrari F154CB 3.9 L Turbo V8	LEC; 6	IMO; 11	MNZ; 10	CAT; 4	SPA; 6	ALG; 7	8th	35
2024	Algarve Pro Racing	LMP2 Pro-Am	Oreca 07	Gibson GK428 4.2 L V8	CAT; 4	LEC; 6	IMO; 1	SPA; 3	MUG; 2	ALG; 2	2nd	96
2025	Algarve Pro Racing	LMP2 Pro-Am	Oreca 07	Gibson GK428 4.2 L V8	CAT; 2	LEC; 6	IMO; 3	SPA; 1	SIL; 1	ALG; 8	2nd	95
2026	Nielsen Racing	LMP2 Pro-Am	Oreca 07	Gibson GK428 4.2 L V8	CAT; Ret	LEC; 1	IMO; 11	SPA; 8	SIL; 10	ALG; 8	10th	34

^{*} Season still in progress.

=== Complete Asian Le Mans Series results ===
(key) (Races in bold indicate pole position) (Races in italics indicate fastest lap)

Year	Team	Class	Car	Engine	1	2	3	4	5	6	Pos.	Points
2024–25	Algarve Pro Racing	LMP2	Oreca 07	Gibson GK428 4.2 L V8	SEP; 1; 6	SEP; 2; 3	DUB; 1; 3	DUB; 2; 1	ABU; 1; 2	ABU; 2; 9	4th	83
2025–26	Nielsen Racing	LMP2	Oreca 07	Gibson GK428 4.2 L V8	SEP; 1; 4	SEP; 2; 9	DUB; 1; 7	DUB; 2; 14	ABU; 1; 14	ABU; 2; 6	9th	28
