= Ahvenisto Race Circuit =

Motor racing track in Hämeenlinna, Finland

- Full Circuit (1967–present)
- Location: Hämeenlinna, Finland
- Coordinates: 61°0′7.38″N 24°25′16.14″E
- Opened: 15 July 1967; 59 years ago
- Major events: Current: Drift Masters (2026); Former: SMP F4 Championship (2015–2018); Porsche Carrera Cup Scandinavia (2004–2005); European Rallycross Championship (1980–1991, 1993–1995, 1997–1999); Formula 750 (1973–1975)
- Website: http://www.ahvenistonmoottorirata.fi/

Full Circuit (1967–present)
- Length: 2.840 km (1.765 mi)
- Turns: 10
- Race lap record: 1.13.226 ( (Finland) Marko Nevalainen, Dallara F397, 2000, F3)

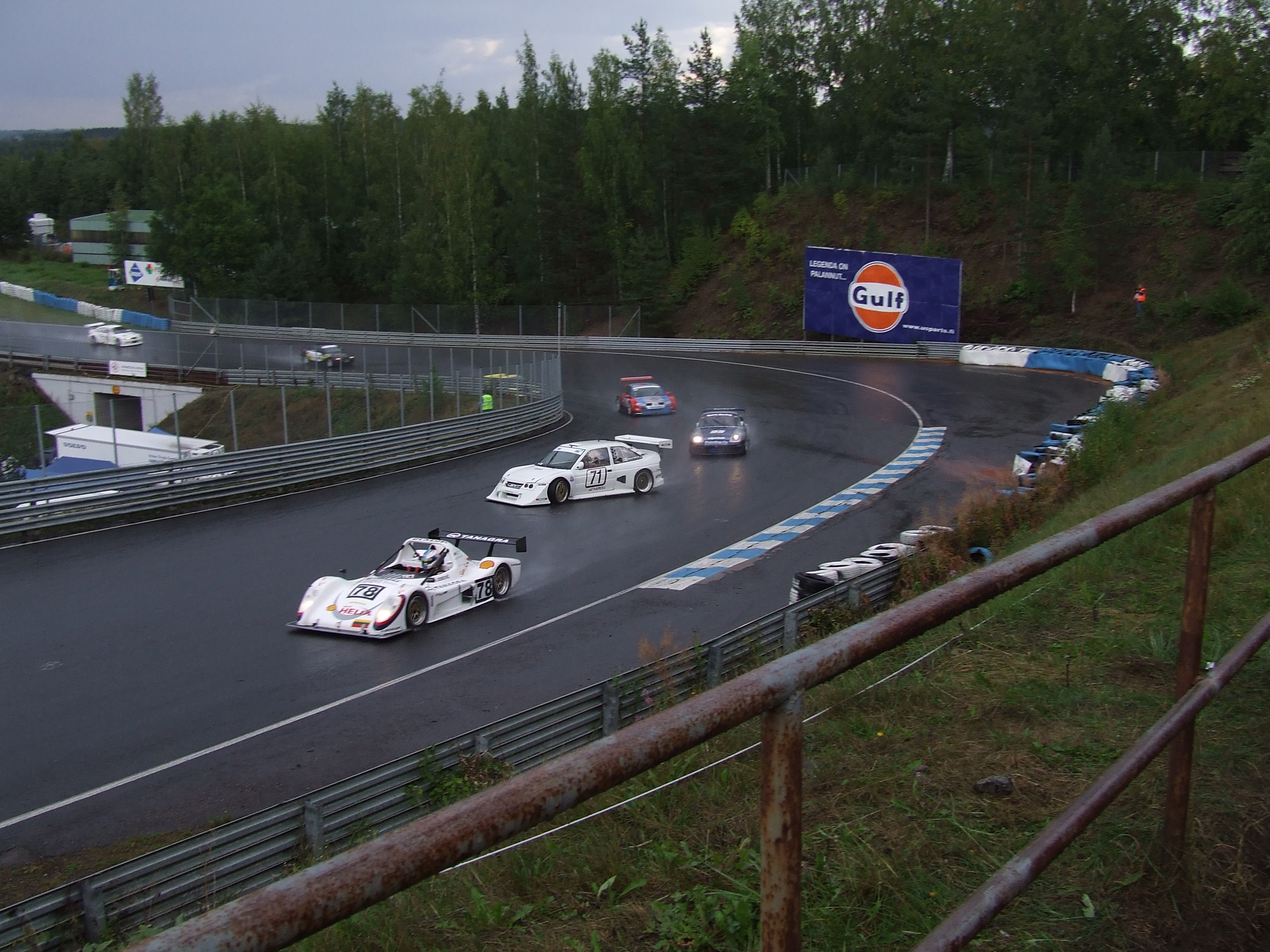
Turn 1 during a wet race

Ahvenisto Race Circuit (Finnish: Ahveniston moottorirata) is a motor racing circuit located in Hämeenlinna, Finland. The circuit is 2.840 km (1.765 mi) long. It features a total elevation change of 32 metres (105 ft), its main straight is 0.280 km (0.174 mi) in length and its width varies between 9 and 17 metres (30 and 56 ft). Its elevation changes, short or sometimes inexistent run-off areas, and numerous fast bends have led to some to suggest that it is the hardest and most dangerous race track in Finland, or even one of the most challenging in the world.

== History ==
The construction of Ahvenisto Race Circuit was finished on 15 July 1967. The same year, "I Hämeenlinnan ajot 1967" became the first international event to be held at the circuit. The Formula Two race was won by Jochen Rindt in a Brabham BT23 ahead of Jack Brabham's Brabham BT23C and Jim Clark's Lotus 48. The Formula Three race saw a battle between Finnish and Swedish drivers, with Sweden's Freddy Kottulinsky taking the win. Other notable entrants included Leo Kinnunen, Ronnie Peterson and Reine Wisell.

=== I Hämeenlinnan ajot 1967 ===
Pos	Driver	Team	Laps	Time
1	(Austria) Jochen Rindt	Roy Winkelmann Racing	20	27:05.53
2	(Australia) Jack Brabham	Motor Racing Developments	20	27:07.71
3	(United Kingdom) Jim Clark	Team Lotus	20	27:31.14
4	(Australia) Frank Gardner	Motor Racing Developments	20	27:33.65
5	(United Kingdom) Graham Hill	Team Lotus	20	28.02.27
6	(United Kingdom) Alan Rees	Roy Winkelmann Racing	19	+1 lap

Sports car and single-seater racing is however, not the only form of motorsport that Ahvenisto has hosted over the years. Notably, the 1960s and 1970s saw road racing events such as the FIM Formula 750 held at the circuit, and between 1980 and 1999 a total of 18 FIA European Rallycross Championship events were organized on a modified, mixed-surface version of the circuit, with some of the run-offs converted into gravel sections. On 6 May 1984, what remains today the most severe helicopter accident in the history of Finland occurred at the track during a race. The pilot lost control of his helicopter while landing and crashed into an audience area, resulting in five spectators dead and 26 injured. The track reached its crowd record in 1985, when over 40,000 people arrived to watch Tähtien kisat ("The Race of Stars"), in which both Formula 1 and World Rally Championship stars from around the world, including Nelson Piquet, Keke Rosberg, Timo Salonen and Michele Mouton, gathered at Ahvenisto to race in identical and near-standard BMW cars. Currently, the track mostly hosts races in national and Nordic championships and cups, including Finnish Touring Car Championship, NEZ Racing Championship, Nordic Supercar, Finnish Rallycross Championship and Historic Race Finland.

== Lap records ==
While the official lap record stands at 1:13.226 and was achieved by Marko Nevalainen in a Formula Three car on 16 September 2000, the 1982 Formula One World Champion Keke Rosberg managed an unofficial lap record of 1:11.000 during his 1984 show run in a Williams FW08C Formula 1 car. Meanwhile, two-time Formula One world champion Mika Häkkinen briefly held the lap record for the Porsche Carrera Cup class, recording a time of 1:19.905 during his visit to Ahvenisto on 29 May 2004 in a Porsche 911 GT3, but was surpassed by a 1:18.923 from Fredrik Ros the following year.

As of June 2015, the fastest official race lap records at the Ahvenisto Race Circuit are listed as:

Category	Time	Driver	Vehicle	Event
Full Circuit (1967–present): 2.840 km (1.765 mi)
Formula Three	1:13.226	Marko Nevalainen	Dallara F397	2000 Ahvenisto Finnish F3 round
Formula Renault 2.0	1:13.887	Jesse Krohn	Tatuus FR2000	2008 2nd Ahvenisto Formula Renault 2.0 Finland round
Formula 4	1:14.115	Aleksanteri Huovinen	Tatuus F4-T014	2015 Ahvenisto SMP F4 round
Group C	1:18.160	Henri Toivonen	Porsche 956	1984 Ahvenisto Nordic SS round
Porsche Carrera Cup	1:18.923	Fredrik Ros	Porsche 911 (997) GT3 Cup	2005 Ahvenisto Porsche Carrera Cup Scandinavia round
Formula Renault 1.6	1:19.007	Oliver Söderström	Signatech FR1.6	2015 Ahvenisto Formula Renault 1.6 Nordic round
Formula Two	1:20.060	Jack Brabham	Brabham BT23C	1967 Hämeelinnan Ajot
Group 6	1:21.590	Jo Bonnier	Lola T210	1970 Hämeenlina 300 km
Group 5	1:23.190	Nils-Gustav Wiik	BMW 320 Turbo	1983 Ahveniston Syyskilpailu
Group 4	1:38.860	Ed Swart	Abarth 2000 S	1970 Hämeenlina 300 km
