= Algarve Pro Racing =

Portuguese racing team

(Portugal) Algarve Pro Racing
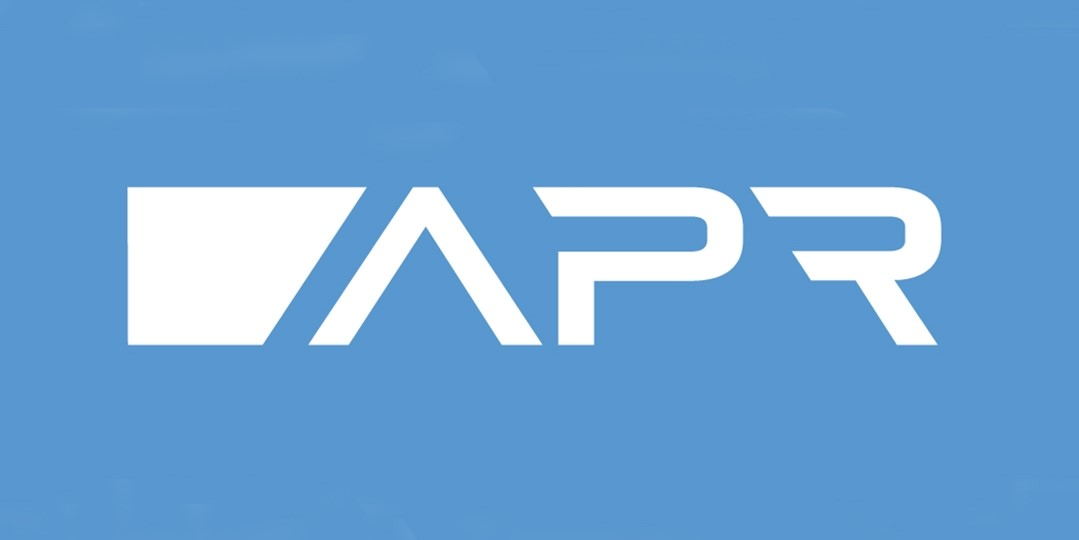
- Founded: 2010
- Founder(s): Stewart Cox; Samantha Cox
- Base: Albufeira, Portugal
- Team principal(s): Stewart Cox; Samantha Cox
- Current series: European Le Mans Series; IMSA SportsCar Championship; Asian Le Mans Series
- Former series: FIA World Endurance Championship; Eurocup Mégane Trophy; Supercar Challenge; Ginetta GT4 Supercup
- Current drivers: European Le Mans Series: 20. (Denmark) Malthe Jakobsen (Denmark) Michael Jensen (Italy) Enzo Trulli; 25. (United Kingdom) Olli Caldwell (Liechtenstein) Matthias Kaiser (Spain) Lorenzo Fluxá; IMSA SportsCar Championship: 04. (United States) Colin Braun (United States) George Kurtz (United Kingdom) Toby Sowery
- Website: https://www.algarveproracingteam.com/

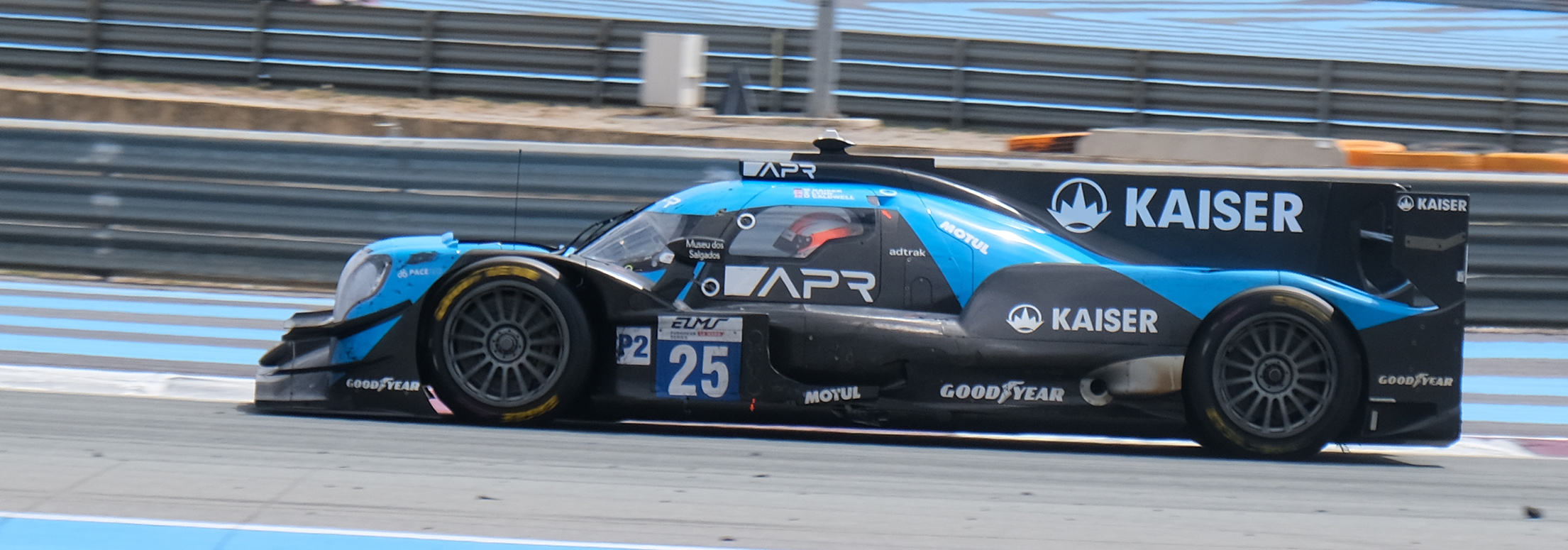
Algarve Pro Racing Oreca 07 at Circuit Paul Ricard

Algarve Pro Racing (APR) is a Portuguese sports car racing team founded in 2010 by husband and wife Stewart and Samantha Cox. The team focuses on prototype racing, fielding LMP2 entries in the European Le Mans Series and IMSA SportsCar Championship, the latter in partnership with CrowdStrike Racing. APR ran cars for the Russian endurance team G-Drive Racing during the 2021 season, ending their partnership following the Russian invasion of Ukraine.

Notable accolades include the 2023 European Le Mans Series title, as well as LMP2 Pro-Am subclass victories at the 2022 and 2023 24 Hours of Le Mans. As of 2026, they are also six-time champions of the Asian Le Mans Series, with titles garnered alongside CrowdStrike and G-Drive as well as under their own name.

Their list of alumni includes renowned sportscar drivers Adam Carroll, Nicky Catsburg, Olivier Pla, Nick Tandy, Oliver Jarvis, Loïc Duval, Yifei Ye, Mikkel Jensen, Alex Lynn, René Rast, Ben Hanley, and Jack Hawksworth, as well as former F1 drivers such as Nyck de Vries, Pietro Fittipaldi and Franco Colapinto.

== Racing record ==
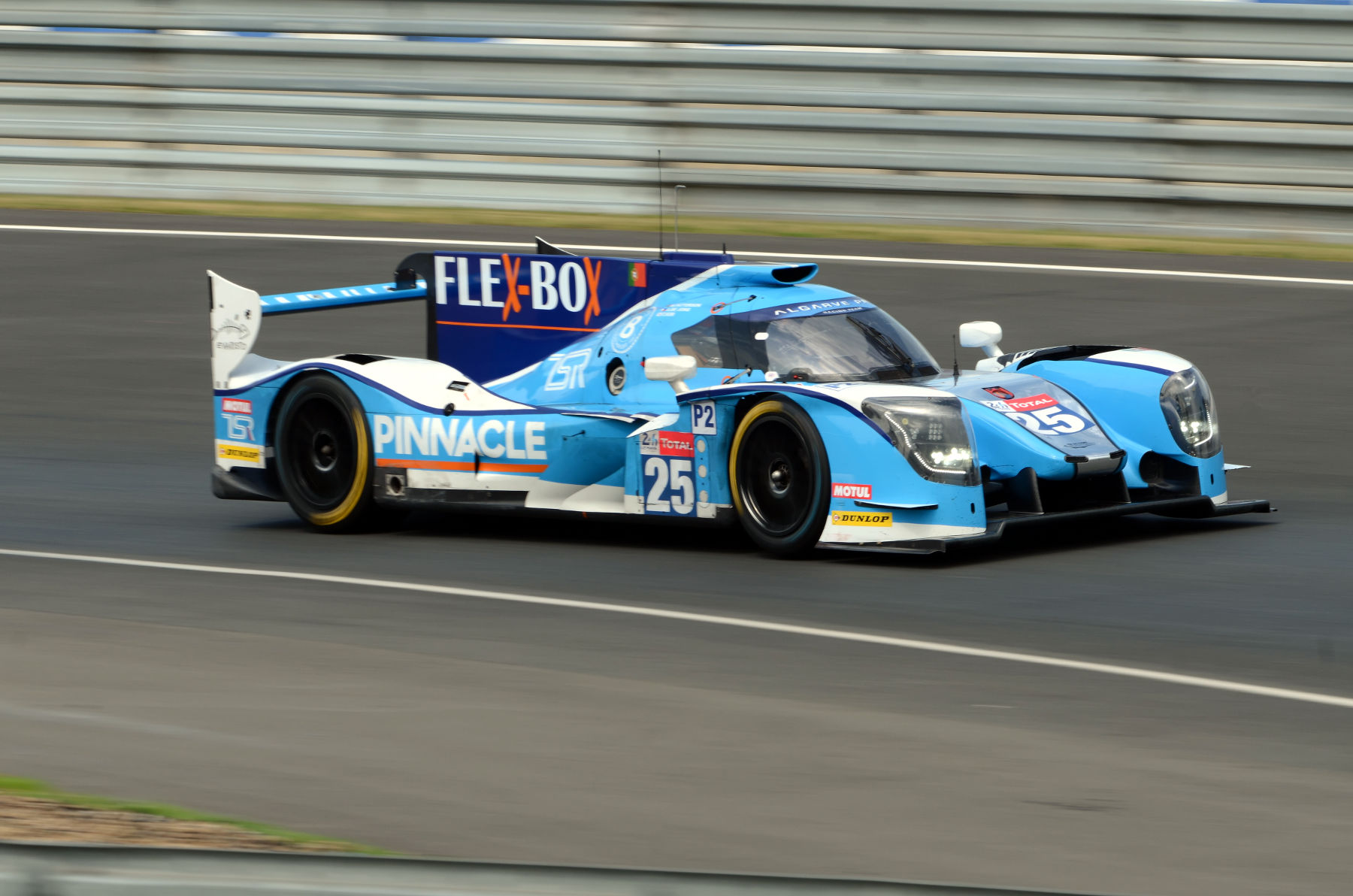
Algarve Pro Racing Ligier JS P217 running at the 2018 24 Hours of Le Mans

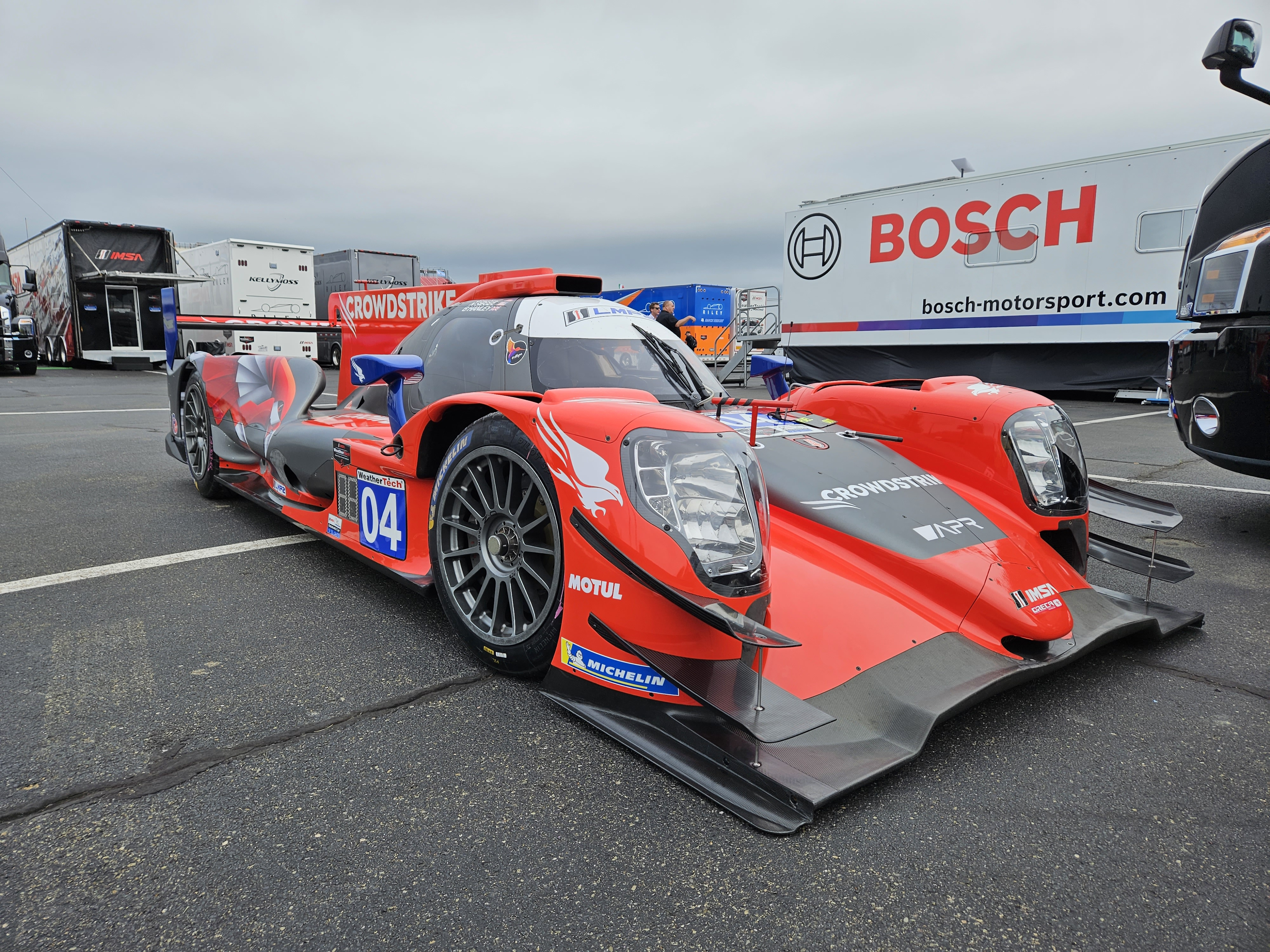
Crowdstrike Racing Oreca 07 (Ran by Algarve Pro Racing) at Watkins Glen International

=== 24 Hours of Le Mans results ===
Year	Entrant	No.	Car	Drivers	Class	Laps	Pos.	Class Pos.
2016	(Portugal) Algarve Pro Racing	25	Ligier JS P2-Nissan	(United Kingdom) Chris Hoy (United Kingdom) Michael Munemann (France) Andrea Pizzitola	LMP2	341	17th	12th
2017	(Portugal) Algarve Pro Racing	45	Ligier JS P217-Gibson	(France) Vincent Capillaire (United States) Matt McMurry (United States) Mark Patterson	LMP2	330	32nd	15th
2018	(Portugal) Algarve Pro Racing	25	Ligier JS P217-Gibson	(Netherlands) Ate de Jong (South Korea) Tacksung Kim (United States) Mark Patterson	LMP2	237	DNF	DNF
2019	(Portugal) Algarve Pro Racing	25	Oreca 07-Gibson	(United States) John Falb (France) Andrea Pizzitola (France) David Zollinger	LMP2	357	15th	10th
2020	(Russia) G-Drive Racing by Algarve	16	Oreca 07-Gibson	(Republic of Ireland) Ryan Cullen (United Kingdom) Oliver Jarvis (United Kingdom) Nick Tandy	LMP2	105	DNF	DNF
2020	(Portugal) Algarve Pro Racing	25	Oreca 07-Gibson	(United States) John Falb (United States) Matt McMurry (Switzerland) Simon Trummer	LMP2	365	11th	7th
2021	G-Drive Racing (Note: G-Drive Racing and Roman Rusinov are Russian, but both competed as neutral competitors using the designation RAF (Russian Automobile Federation), as the Court of Arbitration for Sport upheld a ban on Russia competing at World Championships. The ban was implemented by the World Anti-Doping Agency in response to state-sponsored doping program of Russian athletes.)	25	Aurus 01-Gibson	(Portugal) Rui Andrade (United States) John Falb (Spain) Roberto Merhi	LMP2 (Pro-Am)	108	DNF	DNF
2021	G-Drive Racing	26	Aurus 01-Gibson	(Argentina) Franco Colapinto; Roman Rusinov (Netherlands) Nyck de Vries	LMP2	358	12th	7th
2022	(Portugal) Algarve Pro Racing	45	Oreca 07-Gibson	(Australia) James Allen (Austria) René Binder (United States) Steven Thomas	LMP2 (Pro-Am)	363	19th	1st
2022	(Portugal) Algarve Pro Racing	47	Oreca 07-Gibson	(United Kingdom) Jack Aitken (United States) John Falb (Germany) Sophia Flörsch	LMP2 (Pro-Am)	361	25th	5th
2023	(Portugal) Algarve Pro Racing	47	Oreca 07-Gibson	(Australia) James Allen (United States) Colin Braun (United States) George Kurtz	LMP2 (Pro-Am)	322	20th	1st
2024	(Portugal) Algarve Pro Racing	25	Oreca 07-Gibson	(United Kingdom) Olli Caldwell (Canada) Roman De Angelis (Liechtenstein) Matthias Kaiser	LMP2	294	22nd	8th
2024	(Portugal) CrowdStrike Racing by APR	45	Oreca 07-Gibson	(United States) Colin Braun (Netherlands) Nicky Catsburg (United States) George Kurtz	LMP2 (Pro-Am)	149	DNF	DNF
2025	(Portugal) Algarve Pro Racing	25	Oreca 07-Gibson	(Spain) Lorenzo Fluxá (Liechtenstein) Matthias Kaiser (France) Théo Pourchaire	LMP2	364	25th	8th
2025	(Portugal) Algarve Pro Racing	45	Oreca 07-Gibson	(Netherlands) Nicky Catsburg (United States) George Kurtz (United Kingdom) Alex Quinn	LMP2 (Pro-Am)	362	30th	8th
2026	(United States) CrowdStrike Racing by APR	4	Oreca 07-Gibson	(Germany) Laurin Heinrich (United States) George Kurtz (United Kingdom) Alex Quinn	LMP2 (Pro-Am)	358	21st	1st
2026	(Portugal) Algarve Pro Racing	25	Oreca 07-Gibson	(United Kingdom) Jake Hughes (Denmark) Michael Jensen (Italy) Enzo Trulli	LMP2 (Pro-Am)	356	26th	4th

=== IMSA SportsCar Series results ===
Year	Entrant	Class	Chassis	Engine	No	Drivers	1	2	3	4	5	6	7	8	Pos.	Pts.	MEC
2022	(Russia) G-Drive Racing by APR	LMP2	Oreca 07	Gibson GK428 4.2 L V8	68	(France) François Hériau (United Arab Emirates) Ed Jones (Denmark) Oliver Rasmussen (Germany) René Rast	DQR; 3	DAY; 5	SEB	LGA	MOH	WGI	ELK	ATL	9th	0	8
2022	(Russia) G-Drive Racing by APR	LMP2	Oreca 07	Gibson GK428 4.2 L V8	69	(Australia) James Allen (United States) John Falb (Italy) Luca Ghiotto (Netherlands) Tijmen van der Helm	DQR; 7	DAY; 8	SEB	LGA	MOH	WGI	ELK	ATL	10th	0	8
2023	(United States) CrowdStrike Racing by APR	LMP2	Oreca 07	Gibson GK428 4.2 L V8	04	(United Kingdom) Ben Hanley (United States) George Kurtz (United States) Nolan Siegel 3 (Mexico) Esteban Gutiérrez 1 (United States) Matt McMurry 1	DAY; 2	SEB; 5	LGA; 3	WGI; 1	ELK; 7	IMS; 3	ATL; 1		2nd	1958	42
2024	(United States) CrowdStrike Racing by APR	LMP2	Oreca 07	Gibson GK428 4.2 L V8	04	(United States) Colin Braun (United States) George Kurtz (United Kingdom) Toby Sowery 2 (Denmark) Malthe Jakobsen 1	DAY; 2	SEB; 9	WGI; 13	MOS; 7	ELK	IMS	ATL		12th	1065	28
2025	(Portugal) CrowdStrike Racing by APR	LMP2	Oreca 07	Gibson GK428 4.2 L V8	04	(United States) George Kurtz (Denmark) Malthe Jakobsen 5 (United Kingdom) Toby Sowery 5 (United Kingdom) Alex Quinn 2 (United States) Colton Herta 1	DAY; 6	SEB; 6	WGI; 3	MOS; 11	ELK; 6	IMS; 10	ATL; 10		8th	1836	35
2026*	(Portugal) CrowdStrike Racing by APR	LMP2	Oreca 07	Gibson GK428 4.2 L V8	04	(Denmark) Malthe Jakobsen (United States) George Kurtz (United Kingdom) Alex Quinn (United Kingdom) Toby Sowery	DAY; 1	SEB	WGI	MOS	ELK	IMS	ATL		1st*	373*	13*

* Season still in progress

=== European Le Mans Series ===
Year	Entrant	Class	No	Chassis	Engine	Drivers	1	2	3	4	5	6	Pos.	Pts
2013	(Portugal) Algarve Pro Racing Team	LMPC	46	Oreca FLM09	Chevrolet LS3 6.2L V8	(Netherlands) Nicky Catsburg (rounds 3–4) (United Kingdom) C. O. Jones (rounds 3–4)	SIL	IMO	RBR; 3	HUN; Ret	LEC		4th	16
2015	(Portugal) Algarve Pro Racing	LMP2	25	Ligier JS P2	Nissan VK45DE 4.5 L V8	(United Kingdom) Michael Munemann (rounds 3–5) (Italy) Andrea Roda (rounds 3–5) (United Kingdom) James Winslow (rounds 3–5)	SIL	IMO	RBR; 10	LEC; 8	EST; 7		12th	11
2016	(Portugal) Algarve Pro Racing	LMP2	25	Ligier JS P2	Nissan VK45DE 4.5 L V8	(United Kingdom) Michael Munemann (rounds 1–3, 5) (India) Parth Ghorpade (rounds 1–2) (United Kingdom) Chris Hoy (rounds 1–2) (Switzerland) Jonathan Hirschi (rounds 3–5) (France) Andrea Pizzitola (rounds 3–5) (Italy) Andrea Roda (round 4)	SIL; 10	IMO; Ret	RBR; 5	LEC; 7	SPA; 9	EST	9th	19
2017	(Portugal) Algarve Pro Racing	LMP2	25	Ligier JS P217	Gibson GK428 4.2L V8	(United States) Matt McMurry (France) Andrea Pizzitola (Italy) Andrea Roda	SIL; Ret	MNZ; NC	RBR; NC	LEC; 8	SPA; Ret	ALG; 11	13th	4.5
2018	(Portugal) Algarve Pro Racing	LMP2	25	Ligier JS P217	Gibson GK428 4.2L V8	(South Korea) Tacksung Kim (United States) Mark Patterson (Netherlands) Ate De Jong (rounds 1–4, 6) (United States) Matt McMurry (round 5)	LEC; 16	MNZ; 13	RBR; 17	SIL; 11	SPA; 13‡	ALG; 10	18th	3.25
2018	(Portugal) APR - Rebellion Racing	LMP2	31	Oreca 07	Gibson GK428 4.2L V8	(Republic of Ireland) Ryan Cullen (United States) Gustavo Menezes (United Kingdom) Harrison Newey	LEC; 15	MNZ; 8	RBR; 6	SIL; 5	SPA; 15‡	ALG; 12	9th	23.25
2019	(Portugal) Algarve Pro Racing	LMP2	25	Oreca 07	Gibson GK428 4.2L V8	(United States) John Falb (France) Andrea Pizzitola (Switzerland) Mark Patterson (round 1) (France) Olivier Pla (rounds 3–6)	LEC; 14	MNZ; 12	CAT; 6	SIL; 6	SPA; 10	ALG; 5	9th	28
2019	(Portugal) Algarve Pro Racing	LMP2	31	Oreca 07	Gibson GK428 4.2L V8	(Sweden) Henning Enqvist (United States) James French (South Korea) Tacksung Kim	LEC; 13	MNZ; 14	CAT; 12	SIL; 9	SPA; 13	ALG; 11	13th	4.5
2020	(Portugal) Algarve Pro Racing	LMP2	24	Oreca 07	Gibson GK428 4.2L V8	(Sweden) Henning Enqvist (United Kingdom) Jon Lancaster (France) Loïc Duval (rounds 1–3, 5) (India) Arjun Maini (round 4)	LEC; 6	SPA; 12	LEC; Ret	MNZ; 8	ALG; 12		13th	13
2020	(Portugal) Algarve Pro Racing	LMP2	25	Oreca 07	Gibson GK428 4.2L V8	(France) Gabriel Aubry (United States) John Falb (Switzerland) Simon Trummer (rounds 1–4) (India) Arjun Maini (round 5)	LEC; 10	SPA; 9	LEC; 5	MNZ; 11	ALG; 8		11th	19.5
2021	(Portugal) Algarve Pro Racing	LMP2	24	Oreca 07	Gibson GK428 4.2L V8	(United Kingdom) Richard Bradley (Austria) Ferdinand Habsburg (Mexico) Diego Menchaca (rounds 1–5) (Germany) Sophia Flörsch (round 6)	CAT; 11	RBR; 8	LEC; 7	MNZ; 10	SPA; NC	ALG; 3	10th	27.5
2022	(Portugal) Algarve Pro Racing	LMP2	19	Oreca 07	Gibson GK428 4.2L V8	(Netherlands) Bent Viscaal (Germany) Sophia Flörsch (rounds 1–4) (Romania) Filip Ugran (rounds 5–6)	LEC; 2	IMO; 8	MNZ; 10	CAT; 12	SPA; 8	ALG; 5	7th	37
2022	(Portugal) Algarve Pro Racing	LMP2	47	Oreca 07	Gibson GK428 4.2L V8	(Australia) James Allen (United States) John Falb (Australia) Alex Peroni	LEC; 17	IMO; 15	MNZ; 9	CAT; 8	SPA; 10	ALG; Ret	13th	7
2023	(Portugal) Algarve Pro Racing	LMP2 Pro-Am	20	Oreca 07	Gibson GK428 4.2L V8	(United States) Fred Poordad (France) Tristan Vautier (United Kingdom) Jack Hawksworth (rounds 1–2, 5–6) (Netherlands) Bent Viscaal (rounds 3–4)	CAT; 8	LEC; 8	ARA; 4	SPA; 6	POR; 7	ALG; 8	7th	38
2023	(Portugal) Algarve Pro Racing	LMP2	25	Oreca 07	Gibson GK428 4.2L V8	(Australia) James Allen (United Kingdom) Alex Lynn (Barbados) Kyffin Simpson	CAT; 5	LEC; 1	ARA; 3	SPA; 1	POR; 2	ALG; 2	1st	113
2024	(Portugal) Algarve Pro Racing	LMP2 Pro-Am	20	Oreca 07	Gibson GK428 4.2L V8	(United Kingdom) Richard Bradley (Greece) Kriton Lendoudis (United Kingdom) Alex Quinn	CAT; 4	LEC; 6	IMO; 1	SPA; 3	MUG; 2	ALG; 2	2nd	96
2024	(Portugal) Algarve Pro Racing	LMP2	25	Oreca 07	Gibson GK428 4.2L V8	(United Kingdom) Olli Caldwell (Liechtenstein) Matthias Kaiser (United Kingdom) Alex Lynn	CAT; 2	LEC; 7	IMO; 8	SPA; 14	MUG; 2	ALG; 8	5th	50
2025	(Portugal) Algarve Pro Racing	LMP2 Pro-Am	20	Oreca 07	Gibson GK428 4.2L V8	(United Kingdom) Olli Caldwell (Greece) Kriton Lendoudis (United Kingdom) Alex Quinn	CAT; 2	LEC; 6	IMO; 3	SPA; 1	SIL; 1	ALG; 8	2nd	95
2025	(Portugal) Algarve Pro Racing	LMP2	25	Oreca 07	Gibson GK428 4.2L V8	(Spain) Lorenzo Fluxá (Liechtenstein) Matthias Kaiser (France) Théo Pourchaire	CAT; 5	LEC; 8	IMO; 3	SPA; 12	SIL; 5	ALG; Ret	7th	40
2026	(Portugal) Algarve Pro Racing	LMP2 Pro-Am	20	Oreca 07	Gibson GK428 4.2L V8	(Denmark) Malthe Jakobsen (Denmark) Michael Jensen (Italy) Enzo Trulli	CAT; 1	LEC; 11	IMO; 2	SPA; 2	SIL; 11	ALG; 1	1st	86
2026	(Portugal) Algarve Pro Racing	LMP2	25	Oreca 07	Gibson GK428 4.2L V8	(United Kingdom) Jake Hughes (Liechtenstein) Matthias Kaiser (France) Tristan Vautier (rounds 1–4) (United Kingdom) Ben Barnicoat (round 5) (United Kingdom) Alex Lynn (round 6)	CAT; 9	LEC; 9	IMO; 3	SPA; 5	SIL; 1	ALG; 6	4th	62

=== FIA World Endurance Championship ===
Year	Class	No	Chassis	Engine	Drivers	1	2	3	4	5	6	Pos.	Pts
2022	LMP2	45	Oreca 07	Gibson GK428 4.2L V8	(Australia) James Allen (all rounds) (Austria) René Binder (all rounds) (United States) Steven Thomas (all rounds)	SEB; 11	SPA; 11	LMN; 15 (Note: The team received the points for 9th place, as entries classified higher were not full time entrants in the WEC.)	MON; 7	FUJ; 13	BAH; 12	13th	10
