= Cédric Sbirrazzuoli =

Monégasque racing driver (1987–2026)

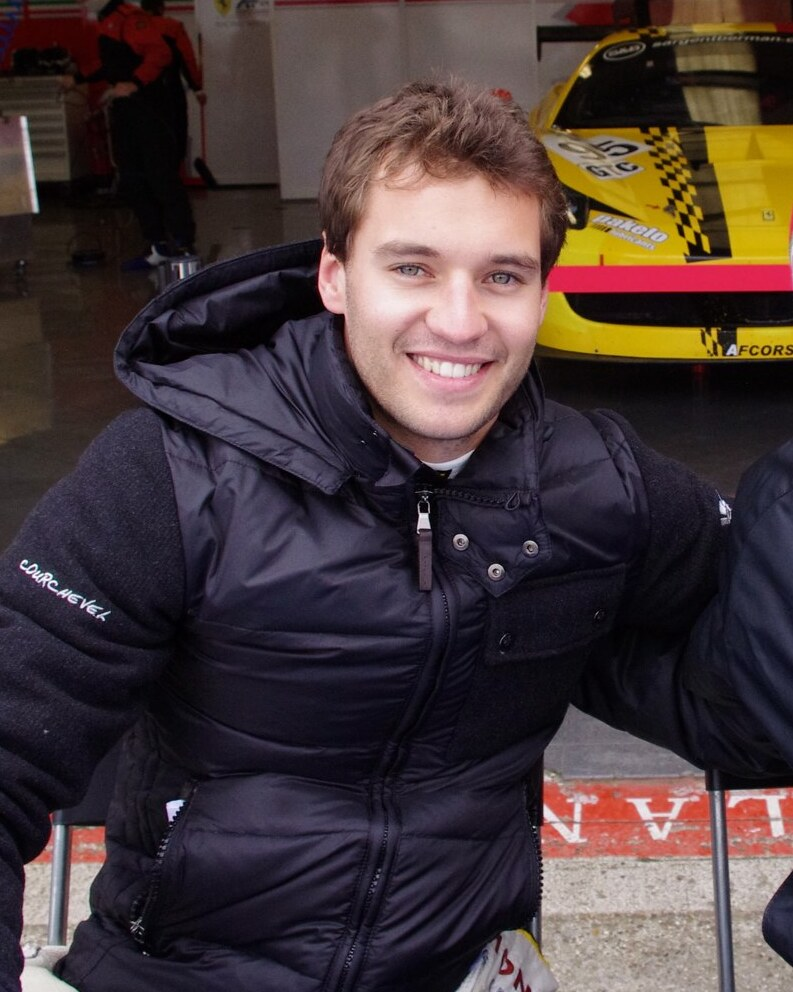
- Sbirrazzuoli in 2014
- Born: 20 August 1987; Monte Carlo, Monaco
- Died: 20 August 2026 (aged 39)
- Nationality: (Monaco) Monégasque
- Categorisation: FIA Silver

Championship titles
- 2011: Trofeo Maserati World Series

Cédric Sbirrazzuoli (20 August 1987 – 20 August 2026) was a Monégasque racing driver. A long-time sportscar racer for AF Corse and Ferrari, Sbirrazzuoli competed in ELMS, IMSA and GT World Challenge Europe, and was previously a Trofeo Maserati champion and Lamborghini junior. He won Petit Le Mans in GTD in 2024.

== Career ==
Sbirrazzuoli made his car racing debut in 2005 by racing in both the Formula Azzurra and Formula Gloria championships. After leaving single-seaters at the end of 2006 and competing part-time in Porsche Carrera Cup Italy across the following two years, Sbirrazzuoli raced part-time for Pecom Racing and AF Corse in 2009 in the FIA GT Championship and GT4 European Cup, respectively.

In 2010, Sbirrazzuoli transitioned to the Superstars GTSprint Series, where he drove in the first five rounds for AF Corse alongside Niki Cadei. After winning at Monza and Algarve to kick off the season, Sbirrazzuoli won at the Hockenheimring and at his final outing of the season at Le Castellet as he ended the year third in points.

Sbirrazzuoli then remained with AF Corse as he spent the next three seasons with them in the Trofeo Maserati World Series, winning the championship in 2011, before switching to their European Le Mans Series programme for 2014. Racing a Ferrari 458 Italia GT3 in the GTC class with Adrien de Leener, Sbirrazzuoli scored one podium in the five-race season, a third-place finish at the Red Bull Ring, as he ended the year eighth in points.

Remaining with AF Corse for 2015, Sbirrazzuoli raced in the Blancpain Endurance Series alongside De Leener, while joining STR alongside Richard Antinucci and Lawrence DeGeorge in Lamborghini Super Trofeo North America. In the former, Sbirrazzuoli scored a lone podium at the season-ending round at the Nürburgring, finishing second in the Pro-Am class as he ended the year 11th in the class standings. In the latter, Sbirrazzuoli won both races at Laguna Seca with Antinucci, before completing the season with DeGeorge as he closed out the year runner-up in Pro-Am points.

Sbirrazzuoli then joined Enrico Bertaggia's Dream Racing Motorsport for a double program in the IMSA SportsCar Championship and Lamborghini Super Trofeo North America as he represented the Lamborghini GT3 Junior Team in 2016. Racing in all but two rounds, Sbirrazzuoli took a best result of sixth in the GTD class at the season-ending Petit Le Mans. Despite taking two pole positions in the latter, Sbirrazzuoli wasn't able to score a podium in the Pro-Am class throughout the season as he ended the season seventh in points.

In 2017, Sbirrazzuoli returned to Dream Racing for selected rounds of the IMSA SportsCar Championship alongside Paolo Ruberti as a Lamborghini junior for the second consecutive season. The Monégasque was set to compete in Pirelli World Challenge during 2017, but never competed despite appearing on the entry list for three rounds. Sbirrazzuoli eventually raced in the series the following year for DXDT Racing, along with a part-time schedule in Lamborghini Super Trofeo Asia. The following year, Sbirrazzuoli returned to Super Trofeo North America and Dream Racing Motorsport, racing in the Pro class alongside Ruberti. The duo won at Virginia International Raceway and Jerez as they finished fifth in points.

The following year, Sbirrazzuoli made his debut in the Bathurst 12 Hour, racing with T2 Racing in the Invitational class. Despite testing for Optimum Motorsport in March of that year, Sbirrazzuoli only competed in one more race in 2020, taking part in the 24 Hours of Spa with Dinamic Motorsport. The following year, Sbirrazzuoli returned to AF Corse, with whom he competed on a part-time basis in both the Italian GT Endurance and Sprint championships, taking a lone GT Cup win at Mugello in the former and a best result of second at Imola in the latter.

Sbirrazzuoli driving a Ferrari 488 GT3 for AF Corse at the 2022 Road to Le Mans.

Staying with AF Corse for 2022, Sbirrazzuoli competed alongside Hugo Delacour in both the GT World Challenge Europe Sprint Cup and the GT World Challenge Europe Endurance Cup alongside Alessandro Balzan for the latter. In the former, Sbirrazzuoli took two class wins at Brands Hatch and Zandvoort on his way to fourth in the Pro-Am points, whereas in the latter, Sbirrazzuoli took two Gold Cup podiums at Imola and Hockenheimring as he ended the year sixth in class.

Having sat out most of 2023, Sbirrazzuoli reunited with Conquest Racing for the final three rounds of the GT4 America Series. At the end of the year, Sbirrazzuoli also returned to AF Corse to compete in the final round of the GT World Challenge Europe Endurance Cup at Barcelona, where he finished third in the Silver class.

After winning the 2024 Bathurst 12 Hour in the Invitational class, Sbirrazzuoli returned to the IMSA SportsCar Championship, with Conquest Racing for the Endurance rounds alongside Manny Franco and Albert Costa. Starting off the season with a third-place finish at the 24 Hours of Daytona, Sbirrazzuoli finished second at the Six Hours of The Glen before winning Petit Le Mans at the end of the year. Sbirrazzuoli then returned to AF Corse for the 2024–25 Asian Le Mans Series season alongside Riccardo Agostini and Custodio Toledo. In the three-round season, Sbirrazzuoli scored a lone podium in the season-opening round at Sepang, which helped him to finish 13th in the GT points.

Sbirrazzuoli was retained by Conquest Racing as the team's third driver for the 2025 IMSA SportsCar Championship season, competing in the first two races of the season before leaving the team ahead of Watkins Glen. Sbirrazzuoli was also set to race in select rounds of the European Le Mans Series for AF Corse as a stand-in for Lilou Wadoux, but ultimately didn't race as Wadoux left Super GT to focus on ELMS.

== Death ==
Sbirrazzuoli died on 20 August 2026, his 39th birthday, following a bout with cancer. He had married his girlfriend Martina in June of that year.

== Racing record ==
=== Racing career summary ===
Season	Series	Team	Races	Wins	Poles	F/Laps	Podiums	Points	Position
2005	Formula Gloria Italy	Europa Corse	10	0	0	0	1	26	11th
2005	Formula Azzurra	Europa Corse	2	0	0	0	0	6	14th
2006	Formula Renault 2.0 Italy Winter Series	Durango	4	0	0	0	0	30	11th
2006	Formula Azzurra	Europa Corse	13	1	2	2	5	48	4th
2007	Porsche Carrera Cup Italy	AB Motorsport	14	0	0	0	0	12	16th
2008	Porsche Carrera Cup Italy	Rangoni Motorsport	2	0	0	0	0	1	22nd
2009	FIA GT Championship – GT2	Pecom Racing	2	0	0	0	0	0	NC
2009	GT4 European Cup – GT4	AF Corse	2	0	0	0	1	11	14th
2010	Superstars GTSprint Series	AF Corse	10	4	1	3	10	166	**3rd**
2010	Trofeo Maserati World Series	AF Corse	2	0	0	0	0		
2011	Trofeo Maserati World Series	AF Corse	9	3	2	0	6		**1st**
2012	Trofeo Maserati World Series	AF Corse	8	1	1	0	3	62	11th
2012	Italian GT Championship – GT3	AF Corse	2	0	0	0	0	8	29th
2013	Trofeo Maserati World Series		8	1	0	0	4	83	8th
2013	International GTSprint Series	AF Corse	2	0	0	0	0	14	38th
2014	Gulf 12 Hours – Pro-Am	AF Corse	1	0	0	0	0	—N/a	8th
2014	European Le Mans Series – GTC	AF Corse	5	0	0	0	1	32	8th
2014	International GT Open – GTS	AF Corse	2	0	0	0	0	4	27th
2015	Blancpain Endurance Series – Pro-Am	AF Corse	5	0	0	1	1	34	11th
2016	IMSA SportsCar Championship – GTD	Dream Racing	8	0	0	0	0	145	14th
2016	Lamborghini Super Trofeo North America – Pro-Am	Dream Racing	8	0	2	1	0	30	7th
2016	Lamborghini Super Trofeo World Final – Pro-Am	Dream Racing	2	0	1	1	0	0	12th
2016	Blancpain GT Series Endurance Cup – Pro-Am	Antonelli Motorsport	1	0	0	0	0	1	49th
2016	Lamborghini Super Trofeo Asia – Pro	GDL Racing	2	0	0	0	0	16	6th
2017	IMSA SportsCar Championship – GTD	Dream Racing Motorsport	3	0	0	0	0	44	48th
2018	Lamborghini Super Trofeo Asia – Pro-Am	Aylezo Motorsport	4	0	0	1	0	30	5th
2018	Pirelli World Challenge Sprint – GT Pro-Am	DXDT Racing	2	0	0	0	0	32	7th
2018	SprintX GT Championship Series – GT Pro-Am	DXDT Racing	2	0	0	0	0	32	7th
2019	Lamborghini Super Trofeo North America – Pro	Dream Racing Motorsport	10	2	1	2	6	83	5th
2019	Lamborghini Super Trofeo World Final – Pro	Dream Racing Motorsport	2	0	0	0	0	16	**3rd**
2020	Bathurst 12 Hour – Invitational	T2 Racing	1	0	0	0	0	—N/a	NC
2020	Australian GT Championship – Invitational	T2 Racing	1	0	0	0	0	7	NC
2020	GT World Challenge Europe Endurance Cup – Silver	Dinamic Motorsport	1	0	0	0	0	0	NC
2020	Intercontinental GT Challenge	Dinamic Motorsport	1	0	0	0	0	0	NC
2021	Italian GT Sprint Championship – GT Cup	AF Corse	2	0	0	0	1	18	NC
2021	Italian GT Sprint Championship – GT3 Am	AF Corse	2	0	0	0	0	7	NC
2021	Italian GT Endurance Championship – GT Cup	AF Corse	1	1	0	0	1	20	NC
2021	International GT Open – Pro-Am	AF Corse	2	0	0	0	0	0	NC
2022	GT World Challenge Europe Endurance Cup – Gold	AF Corse	5	0	0	0	2	52	6th
2022	GT World Challenge Europe Sprint Cup – Pro-Am	AF Corse	9	2	1	1	7	94	4th
2022	Intercontinental GT Challenge	AF Corse	1	0	0	0	0	0	NC
2022	Intercontinental GT Challenge	Conquest Racing	1	0	0	0	0	0	NC
2022	GT World Challenge America – Pro-Am	Conquest Racing	1	0	0	0	0	0	NC
2022	Le Mans Cup – GT3	Spirit of Race	2	0	0	0	0	0	NC
2023	GT4 America Series – Pro-Am	Conquest Racing	7	0	0	0	0	32	15th
2023	GT World Challenge Europe Endurance Cup – Silver	AF Corse	1	0	0	0	1	15	17th
2024	Bathurst 12 Hour – Invitational	T2 Racing	1	1	0	0	1	—N/a	**1st**
2024	IMSA SportsCar Championship – GTD	Conquest Racing	5	1	0	0	3	1405	22nd
2024	GT World Challenge America – Pro-Am	AF Corse	1	0	0	0	0	20	20th
2024–25	Asian Le Mans Series – GT	AF Corse	6	0	0	0	1	26	13th
2025	IMSA SportsCar Championship – GTD	Conquest Racing	2	0	0	0	0	484	45th

=== Complete FIA GT Championship results ===
(key) (Races in bold indicate pole position) (Races in italics indicate fastest lap)

Year	Team	Car	Class	1	2	3	4	5	6	7	8	9	10	Pos.	Pts
2009	Pecom Racing	Ferrari F430 GTC	GT2	SIL	ADR; Ret	OSC	SPA; 6H ?	SPA; 12H ?	SPA; 24H; Ret	BUD	ALG	PAU	ZOL	NC	0

=== Complete GT4 European Cup results ===
(key) (Races in bold indicate pole position) (Races in italics indicate fastest lap)

Year	Team	Car	Class	1	2	3	4	5	6	7	8	9	10	11	12	DC	Pts
2009	AF Corse	Maserati Trofeo	GT4	SIL; 1	SIL; 2	ADR; 1	ADR; 2	OSC; 1	OSC; 2	SPA; 1; 2	SPA; 2; 6	ZOL; 1	ZOL; 2	ALG; 1	ALG; 2	14th	11

=== Complete European Le Mans Series results ===
Year	Entrant	Class	Chassis	Engine	1	2	3	4	5	Rank	Points
2014	AF Corse	GTC	Ferrari 458 Italia GT3	Ferrari 4.5 L V8	SIL; 12	IMO; 12	RBR; 3	LEC; 5	EST; 7	8th	37

=== Complete GT World Challenge Europe results ===
==== GT World Challenge Europe Endurance Cup ====
(key) (Races in bold indicate pole position; races in italics indicate fastest lap)

Year	Team	Car	Class	1	2	3	4	5	6	7	Pos.	Points
2015	AF Corse	Ferrari 458 GT3	Pro-Am	MNZ; 31	SIL; 25	PAU; 17	SPA; 6H; 46	SPA; 12H; 24	SPA; 24H; 11	NÜR; 17	11th	34
2016	Antonelli Motorsport	Lamborghini Huracán GT3	Pro-Am	MNZ	SIL	LEC	SPA; 6H; 33	SPA; 12H; 41	SPA; 24H; 28	NÜR	49th	1
2020	Dinamic Motorsport	Porsche 911 GT3 R	Silver	IMO	NÜR	SPA; 6H; 38	SPA; 12H; 48	SPA; 24H; Ret	LEC		NC	0
2022	AF Corse	Ferrari 488 GT3 Evo 2020	Gold	IMO; 19	LEC; 21	SPA; 6H; 52	SPA; 12H; 47	SPA; 24H; 33	HOC; 19	CAT; 44†	6th	51
2023	AF Corse	Ferrari 296 GT3	Silver	MNZ	LEC	SPA; 6H	SPA; 12H	SPA; 24H	NÜR	CAT; 22	17th	15

† – Sbirrazzuoli did not finish the race, but were classified as they completed over 75% of the race distance.

==== GT World Challenge Europe Sprint Cup ====
(key) (Races in bold indicate pole position) (Races in italics indicate fastest lap)

Year	Team	Car	Class	1	2	3	4	5	6	7	8	9	10	Pos.	Points
2022	AF Corse	Ferrari 488 GT3 Evo 2020	Pro-Am	BRH; 1; 14	BRH; 2; 23	MAG; 1; 22	MAG; 2; 20	ZAN; 1; 15	ZAN; 2; 21	MIS; 1 Ret	MIS; 2 DNS	**VAL**; **1**; 16	VAL; 2; 23	4th	94

=== Complete IMSA SportsCar Championship results ===
(key) (Races in bold indicate pole position) (Races in italics indicate fastest lap)

Year	Team	Class	Make	Engine	1	2	3	4	5	6	7	8	9	10	11	12	Pos.	Points
2016	Dream Racing	GTD	Lamborghini Huracán GT3	Lamborghini 5.2L V10	DAY	SEB; 19	LGA; 16	BEL; 12	WGL; DNS	MOS; 8	LIM; 13	ELK; 15	VIR; 10	AUS	PET; 6		14th	145
2017	Dream Racing Motorsport	GTD	Lamborghini Huracán GT3	Lamborghini 5.2L V10	DAY; 19	SEB; 19	LBH	AUS	BEL	WGL; 11	MOS	LIM	ELK	VIR	LGA	PET	48th	44
2024	Conquest Racing	GTD	Ferrari 296 GT3	Ferrari F163CE 3.0 L Turbo V6	DAY; 3	SEB; 11	LBH	LGA	WGL; 2	MOS	ELK	VIR	IMS; 19	PET; 1			22nd	1405
2025	Conquest Racing	GTD	Ferrari 296 GT3	Ferrari F163CE 3.0 L Turbo V6	DAY; 11	SEB; 7	LBH	LGA	WGL	MOS	ELK	VIR	IMS	PET			45th	484

^{*} Season still in progress.

=== Complete Le Mans Cup results ===
(key) (Races in bold indicate pole position; results in italics indicate fastest lap)

Year	Entrant	Class	Chassis	1	2	3	4	5	6	7	Rank	Points
2022	Spirit of Race	GT3	Ferrari 488 GT3 Evo 2020	LEC	IMO	LMS; 1 Ret	LMS; 2; 6	MNZ	SPA	ALG	NC	0

=== Complete Asian Le Mans Series results ===
(key) (Races in bold indicate pole position) (Races in italics indicate fastest lap)

Year	Team	Class	Car	Engine	1	2	3	4	5	6	Pos.	Points
2024–25	AF Corse	GT	Ferrari 296 GT3	Ferrari F163CE 3.0 L Turbo V6	SEP; 1; 2	SEP; 2; 9	DUB; 1; 7	DUB; 2; 12	ABU; 1; 19	ABU; 2; 19	13th	26
