= 2024 4 Hours of Sepang =

Endurance sportscar racing event

The layout of the Sepang International Circuit

The 2024 4 Hours of Sepang was an endurance sportscar racing event held between 6 and 8 December 2024 at Sepang International Circuit in Sepang, Malaysia. It was the first and second round of 2024–25 Asian Le Mans Series season.

== Entry list ==
The entry list was published on 21 November and consisted of 42 entries across 3 categories – 10 in LMP2, 7 in LMP3 and 25 in GT.

== Schedule ==
Date	Time (local: MST)	Event
Friday, 6 December	13:00	Free Practice 1
Friday, 6 December	16:00	Free Practice 2
Saturday, 7 December	9:50	Qualifying – GT
Saturday, 7 December	10:15	Qualifying – LMP3 and LMP2
Saturday, 7 December	14:00	Race 1
Sunday, 8 December	10:30	Warm-up
Sunday, 8 December	14:00	Race 2

== Free practice ==
- Only the fastest car in each class is shown.

Free Practice 1	Class	No.	Entrant	Driver	Time
Free Practice 1	LMP2	20	(Portugal) Algarve Pro Racing	(United Kingdom) Olli Caldwell	1:52.119
Free Practice 1	LMP3	35	(France) Ultimate	(United Arab Emirates) Matteo Quintarelli	2:00.663
Free Practice 1	GT	23	(Hong Kong) Absolute Racing	(New Zealand) Chris van der Drift	2:04.672
Free Practice 2	Class	No.	Entrant	Driver	Time
Free Practice 2	LMP2	83	(Italy) AF Corse	(France) Matthieu Vaxivière	1:52.924
Free Practice 2	LMP3	34	(Poland) Inter Europol Competition	(Belgium) Douwe Dedecker	2:03.051
Free Practice 2	GT	81	(Germany) Winward Racing	Rinat Salikhov	2:05.285

== Race 1 ==
=== Qualifying ===
Pole position winners in each class are marked in bold.

Pos	Class	No.	Team	Driver	Time	Gap	Grid
1	**LMP2**	**22**	**(Germany) Proton Competition**	**(Italy) Giorgio Roda**	**1:53.197**	—	1
2	LMP2	50	(Italy) AF Corse	(United States) Jeremy Clarke	1:53.428	+0,231	2
3	LMP2	91	(Lithuania) Pure Rxcing	(Saint Kitts and Nevis) Alex Malykhin	1:53.661	+0,464	3
4	LMP2	11	(Germany) Proton Competition	(Germany) Alexander Mattschull	1:54.204	+1,007	4
5	LMP2	83	(Italy) AF Corse	(France) François Perrodo	1:54.865	+1,668	5
6	LMP2	3	(Luxembourg) DKR Engineering	(Greece) Georgios Kolovos	1:55.582	+2,385	6
7	LMP2	25	(Portugal) Algarve Pro Racing	(Denmark) Michael Jensen	1:55.765	+2,568	7
8	LMP2	24	(United Kingdom) Nielsen Racing	(United States) Naveen Rao	1:56.077	+2,880	8
9	LMP2	20	(Portugal) Algarve Pro Racing	(Greece) Kriton Lendoudis	1:56.107	+2,910	9
10	LMP2	30	(France) RD Limited	(United States) Fred Poordad	1:56.357	+3,160	10
11	**LMP3**	**35**	**(France) Ultimate**	**(Belgium) Stéphane Lémeret**	**2:02.088**	**+8,891**	11
12	LMP3	15	(United Kingdom) RLR M Sport	(United Kingdom) Nick Adcock	2:02.476	+9,279	12
13	LMP3	26	(Czech Republic) Bretton Racing	(Denmark) Jens Reno Møller	2:02.551	+9,354	13
14	LMP3	7	(Switzerland) Graff Racing	(Saint Kitts and Nevis) Alexander Bukhantsov	2:02.996	+9,799	14
15	LMP3	34	(Poland) Inter Europol Competition	(United Kingdom) Tim Creswick	2:03.335	+10,138	15
16	LMP3	43	(Poland) Inter Europol Competition	(New Zealand) Steve Brooks	2:05.078	+11,881	16
17	**GT**	**9**	**(Germany) GetSpeed**	**(Luxembourg) Steve Jans**	**2:05.092**	**+11,895**	18
18	GT	28	(Italy) AF Corse	(Italy) Massimiliano Wiser	2:05.127	+11,930	19
19	LMP3	49	(Denmark) High Class Racing	(United States) Mark Patterson	2:05.182	+11,985	17
20	GT	74	(Switzerland) Kessel Racing	(United States) Dustin Blattner	2:05.326	+12,129	20
21	GT	81	(Germany) Winward Racing	Rinat Salikhov	2:05.470	+12,273	21
22	GT	57	(Japan) Car Guy	(Japan) Yudai Uchida	2:05.562	+12,365	22
23	GT	51	(Italy) AF Corse	(Brazil) Custodio Toledo	2:05.869	+12,672	23
24	GT	87	(China) Origine Motorsport	(China) Yuan Bo	2:05.898	+12,701	24
25	GT	2	(China) Climax Racing	(China) Zhou Bihuang	2:05.958	+12,761	25
26	GT	16	(Germany) Winward Racing	Sergey Stolyarov	2:05.973	+12,776	26
27	GT	96	(Bahrain) 2 Seas Motorsport	(United States) Anthony McIntosh	2:06.081	+12,884	27
28	GT	14	(China) Climax Racing	(Canada) Lü Wei	2:06.190	+12,993	28
29	GT	12	(Germany) Car Collection	(Canada) Bashar Mardini	2:06.314	+13,117	29
30	GT	10	(Germany) Manthey	(Hong Kong) Antares Au	2:06.634	+13,437	30
31	GT	23	(Hong Kong) Absolute Racing	(United States) Gregory Bennett	2:06.725	+13,528	31
32	GT	92	(Germany) Manthey EMA	(United States) Ryan Hardwick	2:06.948	+13,751	32
33	GT	77	(United Kingdom) Optimum Motorsport	(United Kingdom) Morgan Tillbrook	2:07.411	+14,214	33
34	GT	89	(New Zealand) EBM	(Indonesia) Anderson Tanoto	2:07.413	+14,216	34
35	GT	82	(Italy) AF Corse	(France) Charles-Henri Samani	2:07.540	+14,343	35
36	GT	60	(Germany) Proton Competition	(Italy) Claudio Schiavoni	2:07.787	+14,590	36
37	GT	79	(San Marino) Tsunami RT	(Italy) Johannes Zelger	2:07.871	+14,674	37
38	GT	85	(Italy) Iron Dames	(France) Célia Martin	2:07.909	+14,712	38
39	GT	21	(Germany) Car Collection	(Switzerland) 'Hash'	2:08.091	+14,894	39
40	GT	27	(United Kingdom) Optimum Motorsport	(United Kingdom) Andrew Gilbert	2:08.155	+14,958	40
41	GT	19	(United Kingdom) Blackthorn	(Switzerland) Claude Bovet	2:08.371	+15,174	41
42	GT	42	(New Zealand) Prime Speed Sport	(New Zealand) René Heremana Malmezac	2:08.848	+15,651	42

=== Race ===
==== Race result ====
The minimum number of laps for classification (70% of overall winning car's distance) was 72 laps. Class winners are marked in bold.

Final Classification
Pos	Class	No.	Team	Drivers	Car	Tyres	Laps	Time/Gap
1	**LMP2**	**30**	**(France) RD Limited**	**(United States) Fred Poordad (France) Tristan Vautier (Australia) James Allen**	**Oreca 07**	MI	**103**	**4:01:12.694**
2	LMP2	83	(Italy) AF Corse	(France) François Perrodo (France) Matthieu Vaxivière (Italy) Alessio Rovera	Oreca 07	MI	103	+0.055
3	LMP2	91	(Lithuania) Pure Rxcing	(Saint Kitts and Nevis) Alex Malykhin (United Kingdom) Harry King (Switzerland) Louis Delétraz	Oreca 07	MI	103	+44.239
4	LMP2	25	(Portugal) Algarve Pro Racing	(Denmark) Michael Jensen (Denmark) Malthe Jakobsen (Italy) Valerio Rinicella	Oreca 07	MI	103	+58.713
5	LMP2	24	(United Kingdom) Nielsen Racing	(United States) Naveen Rao (United Kingdom) Matthew Bell (Netherlands) Nicky Catsburg	Oreca 07	MI	103	+1:05.027
6	LMP2	20	(Portugal) Algarve Pro Racing	(Greece) Kriton Lendoudis (United Kingdom) Olli Caldwell (United Kingdom) Alex Quinn	Oreca 07	MI	103	+1:07.405
7	LMP2	3	(Luxembourg) DKR Engineering	(Greece) Georgios Kolovos (Germany) Laurents Hörr (Netherlands) Job van Uitert	Oreca 07	MI	103	+1:15.142
8	LMP2	50	(Italy) AF Corse	(United States) Jeremy Clarke (United States) Patrick Byrne (France) Olivier Pla	Oreca 07	MI	103	+1:35.871
9	**LMP3**	**35**	**(France) Ultimate**	**(Belgium) Stéphane Lémeret (Italy) Matteo Quintarelli (Hungary) Bence Válint**	**Ligier JS P320**	MI	**98**	**+5 Laps**
10	LMP3	49	(Denmark) High Class Racing	(United States) Mark Patterson (Denmark) Anders Fjordbach	Ligier JS P320	MI	98	+5 Laps
11	LMP3	7	(Switzerland) Graff Racing	(Singapore) Danial Frost (United Kingdom) James Winslow (Saint Kitts and Nevis) Alexander Bukhantsov	Ligier JS P320	MI	98	+5 Laps
12	LMP3	26	(Czech Republic) Bretton Racing	(Denmark) Jens Reno Møller (Czech Republic) Dan Skočdopole (Denmark) Theodor Jensen	Ligier JS P320	MI	98	+5 Laps
13	LMP3	15	(United Kingdom) RLR M Sport	(United Kingdom) Nick Adcock (Mexico) Ian Aguilera (Canada) James Dayson	Ligier JS P320	MI	98	+5 Laps
14	**GT**	**57**	**(Japan) Car Guy**	**(Japan) Yudai Uchida (France) Esteban Masson (Brazil) Daniel Serra**	**Ferrari 296 GT3**	MI	**98**	**+5 Laps**
15	GT	51	(Italy) AF Corse	(Brazil) Custodio Toledo (Monaco) Cédric Sbirrazzuoli (Italy) Riccardo Agostini	Ferrari 296 GT3	MI	98	+5 Laps
16	GT	92	(Germany) Manthey EMA	(United States) Ryan Hardwick (Italy) Riccardo Pera (Austria) Richard Lietz	Porsche 911 GT3 R (992)	MI	98	+5 Laps
17	GT	28	(Italy) AF Corse	(Italy) Massimiliano Wiser (United States) Manuel Franco (Italy) Davide Rigon	Ferrari 296 GT3	MI	98	+5 Laps
18	GT	81	(Germany) Winward Racing	(France) Jules Gounon (Italy) Gabriele Piana; Rinat Salikhov	Mercedes-AMG GT3 EVO	MI	98	+5 Laps
19	GT	74	(Switzerland) Kessel Racing	(United States) Dustin Blattner (United Kingdom) Ben Tuck (Germany) Dennis Marschall	Ferrari 296 GT3	MI	98	+5 Laps (Note: The No. 74 Kessel Racing was penalised for Dennis Marschall exceeding his maximum driving time by 4.592 seconds. Stewards imposed 5 seconds Stop & Go penalty for that which was converted into 35 seconds time penalty.)
20	GT	60	(Germany) Proton Competition	(Italy) Claudio Schiavoni (Italy) Matteo Cressoni (Belgium) Alessio Picariello	Porsche 911 GT3 R (992)	MI	97	+6 Laps
21	GT	96	(Bahrain) 2 Seas Motorsport	(United States) Anthony McIntosh (Canada) Parker Thompson (United Kingdom) Ben Barnicoat	Mercedes-AMG GT3 EVO	MI	97	+6 Laps
22	GT	12	(Germany) Car Collection	(Canada) Bashar Mardini (United Kingdom) James Kell (Germany) Nico Menzel	Porsche 911 GT3 R (992)	MI	97	+6 Laps
23	GT	2	(China) Climax Racing	(China) Zhou Bihuang (Finland) Elias Seppänen (Estonia) Ralf Aron	Mercedes-AMG GT3 EVO	MI	97	+6 Laps
24	GT	89	(New Zealand) EBM	(Indonesia) Anderson Tanoto (New Zealand) Brendon Leitch (Denmark) Marco Sørensen	Aston Martin Vantage AMR GT3	MI	97	+6 Laps
25	GT	77	(United Kingdom) Optimum Motorsport	(United Kingdom) Morgan Tillbrook (United Kingdom) Tom Ikin (United Kingdom) Tom Gamble	McLaren 720S GT3	MI	97	+6 Laps
26	GT	85	(Italy) Iron Dames	(France) Célia Martin (Belgium) Sarah Bovy (Denmark) Michelle Gatting	Porsche 911 GT3 R (992)	MI	97	+6 Laps
27	GT	27	(United Kingdom) Optimum Motorsport	(United Kingdom) Andrew Gilbert (Spain) Fran Rueda (Germany) Benjamin Goethe	McLaren 720S GT3	MI	97	+6 Laps
28	GT	9	(Germany) GetSpeed	(United States) Anthony Bartone (Luxembourg) Steve Jans (Germany) Fabian Schiller	Mercedes-AMG GT3 EVO	MI	97	+6 Laps
29	GT	19	(United Kingdom) Blackthorn	(Switzerland) Claude Bovet (United Kingdom) Jason Ambrose (United Kingdom) David McDonald	Aston Martin Vantage AMR GT3	MI	96	+7 Laps
30	GT	21	(Germany) Car Collection	(Switzerland) 'Hash' (Switzerland) Alex Fontana (Switzerland) Yannick Mettler	Porsche 911 GT3 R (992)	MI	96	+7 Laps
31	GT	14	(China) Climax Racing	(Canada) Lü Wei (China) Ling Kang (Austria) Lucas Auer	Mercedes-AMG GT3 EVO	MI	96	+7 Laps
32	GT	42	(New Zealand) Prime Speed Sport	(New Zealand) René Heremana Malmezac (Australia) Nicholas Foster (New Zealand) Jono Lester	Lamborghini Huracán GT3 EVO2	MI	96	+7 Laps
33	GT	82	(Italy) AF Corse	(France) Charles-Henri Samani (Denmark) Conrad Laursen (Argentina) Nicolás Varrone	Ferrari 296 GT3	MI	95	+8 Laps
34	LMP2	11	(Germany) Proton Competition	(Germany) Alexander Mattschull (Germany) Jonas Ried (Switzerland) Mathias Beche	Oreca 07	MI	92	+11 Laps (Note: The No. 11 Proton Competition lost 10 laps from the sum of completed laps as the result of the penalty for not meeting the minimum driving time by Mathias Beche. Beche drove 20 minutes less than required minimum.)
35	GT	79	(San Marino) Tsunami RT	(Italy) Johannes Zelger (Italy) Fabio Babini (New Zealand) Daniel Gaunt	Porsche 911 GT3 R (992)	MI	90	+13 Laps (Note: The No. 79 Tsunami RT was penalised for Daniel Gaunt exceeding his maximum stint time by 16 minutes. Stewards deducted 7 laps from the sum of completed laps by the crew and imposed time penalty of 1 minute and 53 seconds.)
Not classified
	GT	16	(Germany) Winward Racing	(Germany) Maro Engel; Viktor Shaytar; Sergey Stolyarov	Mercedes-AMG GT3 EVO	MI	34	
	GT	10	(Germany) Manthey	(Hong Kong) Antares Au (Austria) Klaus Bachler (Germany) Joel Sturm	Porsche 911 GT3 R (992)	MI	31	
	LMP3	43	(Poland) Inter Europol Competition	(New Zealand) Steve Brooks (Switzerland) Kévin Rabin (Denmark) Mikkel Kristensen	Ligier JS P320	MI	31	
	GT	87	(China) Origine Motorsport	(China) Yuan Bo (China) Leo Ye Hongli (Germany) Laurin Heinrich	Porsche 911 GT3 R (992)	MI	20	
	LMP3	34	(Poland) Inter Europol Competition	(United Kingdom) Tim Creswick (Canada) Daniel Ali (Belgium) Douwe Dedecker	Ligier JS P320	MI	20	
	GT	23	(Hong Kong) Absolute Racing	(Thailand) Carl Wattana Bennett (United States) Gregory Bennett (New Zealand) Chris van der Drift	Ferrari 296 GT3	MI	2	
Disqualified
	LMP2	22	(Germany) Proton Competition	(Italy) Giorgio Roda (France) Vladislav Lomko (France) Tom Dillmann	Oreca 07	MI	103	(Note: The No. 22 Proton Competition was found in post-race scrutineering to have less fuel than required minimum of 1 litre and was disqualified for that.)

==== Statistics ====
===== Fastest lap =====
Class	Driver	Team	Time	Lap
LMP2	(United Kingdom) Harry King	(Lithuania) #91 Pure Rxcing	1:53.102	30
LMP3	(Hungary) Bence Válint	(France) #35 Ultimate	2:02.285	44
GT	(Italy) Riccardo Agostini	(Italy) #51 AF Corse	2:04.672	41

== Race 2 ==
=== Qualifying ===
One Qualifying session was held. Each crew's second fastest lap was used to determine the grid for the Race 2. Pole position winners in each class are marked in bold.

Pos	Class	No.	Team	Driver	Time	Gap	Grid
1	**LMP2**	**22**	**(Germany) Proton Competition**	**(Italy) Giorgio Roda**	**1:53.382**	—	1
2	LMP2	91	(Lithuania) Pure Rxcing	(Saint Kitts and Nevis) Aliaksandr Malykhin	1:53.908	+0,526	2
3	LMP2	50	(Italy) AF Corse	(United States) Jeremy Clarke	1:53.999	+0,617	3
4	LMP2	11	(Germany) Proton Competition	(Germany) Alexander Mattschull	1:55.000	+1,618	4
5	LMP2	83	(Italy) AF Corse	(France) François Perrodo	1:55.358	+1,976	5
6	LMP2	3	(Luxembourg) DKR Engineering	(Greece) Georgios Kolovos	1:55.599	+2,217	6
7	LMP2	25	(Portugal) Algarve Pro Racing	(Denmark) Michael Jensen	1:56.377	+2,995	7
8	LMP2	20	(Portugal) Algarve Pro Racing	(Greece) Kriton Lendoudis	1:56.409	+3,027	8
9	LMP2	24	(United Kingdom) Nielsen Racing	(United States) Naveen Rao	1:56.466	+3,084	9
10	LMP2	30	(France) RD Limited	(United States) Fred Poordad	1:56.911	+3,529	10
11	**LMP3**	**35**	**(France) Ultimate**	**(Belgium) Stéphane Lémeret**	**2:02.144**	**+8,762**	11
12	LMP3	15	(United Kingdom) RLR M Sport	(United Kingdom) Nick Adcock	2:02.495	+9,113	12
13	LMP3	26	(Czech Republic) Bretton Racing	(Denmark) Jens Reno Møller	2:02.765	+9,383	13
14	LMP3	7	(Switzerland) Graff Racing	(United Arab Emirates) Alexander Bukhantsov	2:03.022	+9,640	14
15	LMP3	34	(Poland) Inter Europol Competition	(United Kingdom) Tim Creswick	2:03.657	+10,275	15
16	**GT**	**28**	**(Italy) AF Corse**	**(Italy) Massimiliano Wiser**	**2:05.253**	**+11,871**	18
17	LMP3	49	(Denmark) High Class Racing	(United States) Mark Patterson	2:05.265	+11,883	16
18	GT	9	(Germany) GetSpeed	(Luxembourg) Steve Jans	2:05.317	+11,935	19
19	LMP3	43	(Poland) Inter Europol Competition	(New Zealand) Steve Brooks	2:05.363	+11,981	17
20	GT	74	(Switzerland) Kessel Racing	(United States) Dustin Blattner	2:05.458	+12,076	20
21	GT	81	(Germany) Winward Racing	Rinat Salikhov	2:05.477	+12,095	21
22	GT	57	(Japan) Car Guy	(Japan) Yudai Uchida	2:05.961	+12,579	22
23	GT	2	(China) Climax Racing	(China) Zhou Bihuang	2:06.118	+12,736	23
24	GT	87	(China) Origine Motorsport	(China) Yuan Bo	2:06.147	+12,765	27 (Note: The No. 87 Origine Motorsport was moved 3 places back on the starting grid for Race 2 as a result of a penalty from Race 1.)
25	GT	16	(Germany) Winward Racing	Sergey Stolyarov	2:06.341	+12,959	24
26	GT	51	(Italy) AF Corse	(Brazil) Custodio Toledo	2:06.390	+13,008	25
27	GT	14	(China) Climax Racing	(Canada) Lü Wei	2:06.452	+13,070	26
28	GT	10	(Germany) Manthey	(Hong Kong) Antares Au	2:06.647	+13,265	28
29	GT	96	(Bahrain) 2 Seas Motorsport	(United States) Anthony McIntosh	2:06.674	+13,292	29
30	GT	12	(Germany) Car Collection	(Canada) Bashar Mardini	2:06.725	+13,343	30
31	GT	23	(Hong Kong) Absolute Racing	(United States) Gregory Bennett	2:06.763	+13,381	31
32	GT	77	(United Kingdom) Optimum Motorsport	(United Kingdom) Morgan Tillbrook	2:07.449	+14,067	32
33	GT	92	(Germany) Manthey EMA	(United States) Ryan Hardwick	2:07.582	+14,200	33
34	GT	89	(New Zealand) EBM	(Indonesia) Anderson Tanoto	2:07.665	+14,283	34
35	GT	82	(Italy) AF Corse	(France) Charles-Henri Samani	2:07.709	+14,327	35
36	GT	79	(San Marino) Tsunami RT	(Italy) Johannes Zelger	2:08.094	+14,712	36
37	GT	85	(Italy) Iron Dames	(France) Célia Martin	2:08.243	+14,861	37
38	GT	60	(Germany) Proton Competition	(Italy) Claudio Schiavoni	2:08.376	+14,994	38
39	GT	27	(United Kingdom) Optimum Motorsport	(United Kingdom) Andrew Gilbert	2:08.394	+15,012	39
40	GT	19	(United Kingdom) Blackthorn	(Switzerland) Claude Bovet	2:08.473	+15,091	40
41	GT	21	(Germany) Car Collection	(Switzerland) 'Hash'	2:08.518	+15,136	41
42	GT	42	(New Zealand) Prime Speed Sport	(New Zealand) René Heremana Malmezac	2:08.994	+15,612	42

=== Race ===
==== Race result ====
The minimum number of laps for classification (70% of overall winning car's distance) was 58 laps. Class winners are marked in bold.

Final Classification
Pos	Class	No.	Team	Drivers	Car	Tyres	Laps	Time/Gap
1	**LMP2**	**25**	**(Portugal) Algarve Pro Racing**	**(Denmark) Michael Jensen (Denmark) Malthe Jakobsen (Italy) Valerio Rinicella**	**Oreca 07**	MI	**83**	**3:02:57.043**
2	LMP2	30	(France) RD Limited	(United States) Fred Poordad (France) Tristan Vautier (Australia) James Allen	Oreca 07	MI	83	+25.089
3	LMP2	20	(Portugal) Algarve Pro Racing	(Greece) Kriton Lendoudis (United Kingdom) Olli Caldwell (United Kingdom) Alex Quinn	Oreca 07	MI	83	+26.633
4	LMP2	22	(Germany) Proton Competition	(Italy) Giorgio Roda (France) Vladislav Lomko (France) Tom Dillmann	Oreca 07	MI	83	+37.868
5	LMP2	24	(United Kingdom) Nielsen Racing	(United States) Naveen Rao (United Kingdom) Matthew Bell (Netherlands) Nicky Catsburg	Oreca 07	MI	83	+40.242
6	LMP2	83	(Italy) AF Corse	(France) François Perrodo (France) Matthieu Vaxivière (Italy) Alessio Rovera	Oreca 07	MI	83	+1:18.754
7	LMP2	50	(Italy) AF Corse	(United States) Jeremy Clarke (United States) Patrick Byrne (France) Olivier Pla	Oreca 07	MI	83	+1:33.064
8	LMP2	91	(Lithuania) Pure Rxcing	(Saint Kitts and Nevis) Alex Malykhin (United Kingdom) Harry King (Switzerland) Louis Delétraz	Oreca 07	MI	83	+1:35.607
9	LMP2	3	(Luxembourg) DKR Engineering	(Greece) Georgios Kolovos (Germany) Laurents Hörr (Netherlands) Job van Uitert	Oreca 07	MI	83	+2:19.755 (Note: The No. 3 DKR Engineering was penalised for two offenses during a single pit stop. The first infringement was stopping the car in the wrong spot and the second one was changing tyres before refuelling. Stewards imposed two 10 seconds time penalties for these offenses.)
10	**LMP3**	**35**	**(France) Ultimate**	**(Belgium) Stéphane Lémeret (Italy) Matteo Quintarelli (Hungary) Bence Válint**	**Ligier JS P320**	MI	**79**	**+4 Laps**
11	LMP3	49	(Denmark) High Class Racing	(United States) Mark Patterson (Denmark) Anders Fjordbach	Ligier JS P320	MI	78	+5 Laps
12	LMP3	15	(United Kingdom) RLR M Sport	(United Kingdom) Nick Adcock (Mexico) Ian Aguilera (Canada) James Dayson	Ligier JS P320	MI	78	+5 Laps
13	LMP2	11	(Germany) Proton Competition	(Germany) Alexander Mattschull (Germany) Jonas Ried	Oreca 07	MI	78	+5 Laps
14	LMP3	26	(Czech Republic) Bretton Racing	(Denmark) Jens Reno Møller (Czech Republic) Dan Skočdopole (Denmark) Theodor Jensen	Ligier JS P320	MI	78	+5 Laps
15	**GT**	**81**	**(Germany) Winward Racing**	**(France) Jules Gounon (Italy) Gabriele Piana; Rinat Salikhov**	**Mercedes-AMG GT3 EVO**	MI	**78**	**+5 Laps**
16	GT	10	(Germany) Manthey	(Hong Kong) Antares Au (Austria) Klaus Bachler (Germany) Joel Sturm	Porsche 911 GT3 R (992)	MI	78	+5 Laps
17	GT	28	(Italy) AF Corse	(Italy) Massimiliano Wiser (United States) Manuel Franco (Italy) Davide Rigon	Ferrari 296 GT3	MI	78	+5 Laps
18	GT	2	(China) Climax Racing	(China) Zhou Bihuang (Finland) Elias Seppänen (Estonia) Ralf Aron	Mercedes-AMG GT3 EVO	MI	78	+5 Laps
19	GT	87	(China) Origine Motorsport	(China) Yuan Bo (China) Leo Ye Hongli (Germany) Laurin Heinrich	Porsche 911 GT3 R (992)	MI	77	+6 Laps
20	GT	85	(Italy) Iron Dames	(France) Célia Martin (Belgium) Sarah Bovy (Denmark) Michelle Gatting	Porsche 911 GT3 R (992)	MI	77	+6 Laps
21	GT	9	(Germany) GetSpeed	(United States) Anthony Bartone (Luxembourg) Steve Jans (Germany) Fabian Schiller	Mercedes-AMG GT3 EVO	MI	77	+6 Laps
22	GT	96	(Bahrain) 2 Seas Motorsport	(United States) Anthony McIntosh (Canada) Parker Thompson (United Kingdom) Ben Barnicoat	Mercedes-AMG GT3 EVO	MI	77	+6 Laps
23	GT	51	(Italy) AF Corse	(Brazil) Custodio Toledo (Monaco) Cédric Sbirrazzuoli (Italy) Riccardo Agostini	Ferrari 296 GT3	MI	77	+6 Laps (Note: The No. 51 AF Corse was penalised for overtaking cars during pass around procedure while not being eligible for it. Stewards imposed 25 seconds time penalty for that.)
24	GT	82	(Italy) AF Corse	(France) Charles-Henri Samani (Denmark) Conrad Laursen (Argentina) Nicolás Varrone	Ferrari 296 GT3	MI	77	+6 Laps
25	GT	16	(Germany) Winward Racing	(Germany) Maro Engel; Viktor Shaytar; Sergey Stolyarov	Mercedes-AMG GT3 EVO	MI	77	+6 Laps
26	GT	74	(Switzerland) Kessel Racing	(United States) Dustin Blattner (United Kingdom) Ben Tuck (Germany) Dennis Marschall	Ferrari 296 GT3	MI	77	+6 Laps
27	GT	92	(Germany) Manthey EMA	(United States) Ryan Hardwick (Italy) Riccardo Pera (Austria) Richard Lietz	Porsche 911 GT3 R (992)	MI	77	+6 Laps
28	GT	77	(United Kingdom) Optimum Motorsport	(United Kingdom) Morgan Tillbrook (United Kingdom) Tom Ikin (United Kingdom) Tom Gamble	McLaren 720S GT3	MI	77	+6 Laps
29	GT	12	(Germany) Car Collection	(Canada) Bashar Mardini (United Kingdom) James Kell (Germany) Nico Menzel	Porsche 911 GT3 R (992)	MI	77	+6 Laps (Note: The No. 12 Car Collection was penalised for having their pit stop outside allocated spot. Stewards imposed 10 seconds time penalty for that.)
30	GT	14	(China) Climax Racing	(Canada) Lü Wei (China) Ling Kang (Austria) Lucas Auer	Mercedes-AMG GT3 EVO	MI	77	+6 Laps
31	GT	60	(Germany) Proton Competition	(Italy) Claudio Schiavoni (Italy) Matteo Cressoni (Belgium) Alessio Picariello	Porsche 911 GT3 R (992)	MI	77	+6 Laps
32	GT	89	(New Zealand) EBM	(Indonesia) Anderson Tanoto (New Zealand) Brendon Leitch (Denmark) Marco Sørensen	Aston Martin Vantage AMR GT3	MI	77	+6 Laps
33	LMP3	34	(Poland) Inter Europol Competition	(United Kingdom) Tim Creswick (Canada) Daniel Ali (Belgium) Douwe Dedecker	Ligier JS P320	MI	76	+7 Laps
34	GT	79	(San Marino) Tsunami RT	(Italy) Johannes Zelger (Italy) Fabio Babini (New Zealand) Daniel Gaunt	Porsche 911 GT3 R (992)	MI	76	+7 Laps
35	GT	19	(United Kingdom) Blackthorn	(Switzerland) Claude Bovet (United Kingdom) Jason Ambrose (United Kingdom) David McDonald	Aston Martin Vantage AMR GT3	MI	76	+7 Laps
36	GT	23	(Hong Kong) Absolute Racing	(Thailand) Carl Wattana Bennett (United States) Gregory Bennett (New Zealand) Chris van der Drift	Ferrari 296 GT3	MI	75	+8 Laps (Note: The No. 23 Absolute Racing was penalised for Carl Wattana Bennett exceeding his maximum driving time by 1 minute and 49.307 seconds. Stewards imposed 1 minute and 50 seconds Stop & Go penalty converted into deduction of 1 lap from the sum of completed by them and 12 seconds time penalty.)
37	GT	21	(Germany) Car Collection	(Switzerland) 'Hash' (Switzerland) Alex Fontana (Switzerland) Yannick Mettler	Porsche 911 GT3 R (992)	MI	75	+8 Laps (Note: The No. 21 Car Collection was penalised for having their pit stop outside allocated spot. Stewards imposed 10 seconds time penalty for that.)
38	GT	27	(United Kingdom) Optimum Motorsport	(United Kingdom) Andrew Gilbert (Spain) Fran Rueda (Germany) Benjamin Goethe	McLaren 720S GT3	MI	72	+11 Laps
39	LMP3	43	(Poland) Inter Europol Competition	(New Zealand) Steve Brooks (Switzerland) Kévin Rabin (Denmark) Mikkel Kristensen	Ligier JS P320	MI	61	+22 Laps
Not classified
	LMP3	7	(Switzerland) Graff Racing	(Singapore) Danial Frost (United Kingdom) James Winslow (Saint Kitts and Nevis) Alexander Bukhantsov	Ligier JS P320	MI	55	
	GT	57	(Japan) Car Guy	(Japan) Yudai Uchida (France) Esteban Masson (Brazil) Daniel Serra	Ferrari 296 GT3	MI	9	
	GT	42	(New Zealand) Prime Speed Sport	(New Zealand) René Heremana Malmezac (Australia) Nicholas Foster (New Zealand) Jono Lester	Lamborghini Huracán GT3 EVO2	MI	9	

==== Statistics ====
===== Fastest lap =====
Class	Driver	Team	Time	Lap
LMP2	(United Kingdom) Harry King	(Lithuania) #91 Pure Rxcing	1:53.519	40
LMP3	(Denmark) Anders Fjordbach	(Denmark) #49 High Class Racing	2:03.510	53
GT	(United Kingdom) Tom Gamble	(United Kingdom) #77 Optimum Motorsport	2:06.925	32

Asian Le Mans Series
Previous race: None	2024–25 season	Next race: 4 Hours of Dubai
