= Valerio Rinicella =

Italian racing driver (born 2007)

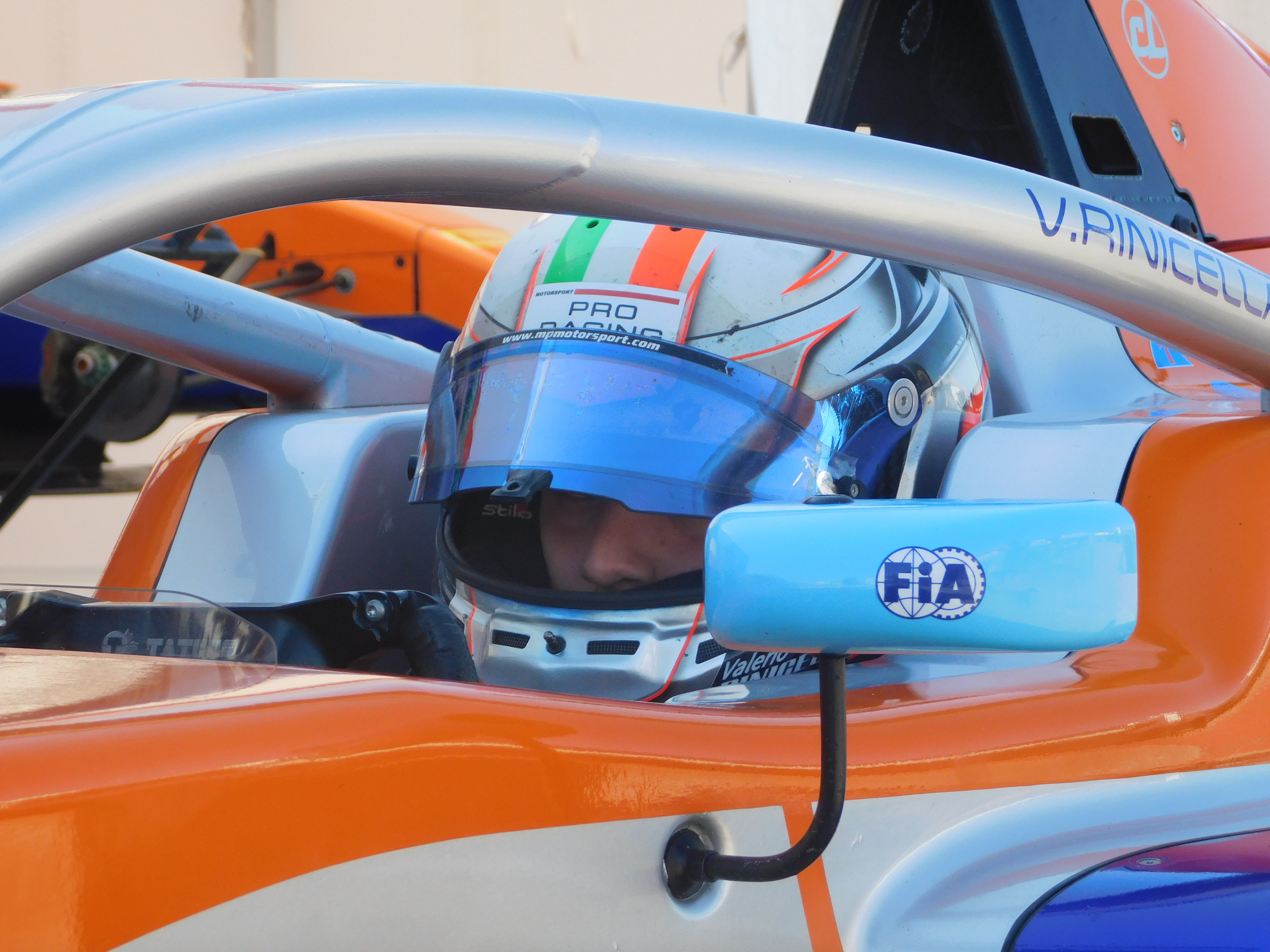
- Rinicella in 2025
- Nationality: (Italy) Italian
- Born: 18 January 2007 (age 19) Rome, Italy

European Le Mans Series career
- Debut season: 2026
- Current team: IDEC Sport
- Categorisation: FIA Silver
- Car number: 18
- Starts: 0
- Wins: 0
- Podiums: 0
- Poles: 0
- Fastest laps: 0
- Best finish: TBD in 2026

Previous series
- 2025 2025 2025 2024–25 2024–2025 2024 2022 2022–2023 2022–2023: Le Mans Cup; Eurocup-3; Eurocup-3 Winter; Asian Le Mans Series; FR European; FR Middle East; F4 Italian; F4 Spanish; F4 UAE

Championship titles
- 2024-25: Asian Le Mans Series - LMP2

Valerio Rinicella (born 18 January 2007) is an Italian racing driver who is set to compete in the European Le Mans Series with IDEC Sport. Rinicella was the 2025 Eurocup-3 runner-up and was third in the 2023 F4 Spanish Championship, as well as being the champion of the 2024-25 Asian Le Mans Series.

Rinicella is a protégé of Formula One race winner Giancarlo Fisichella and GT racer Marco Cioci.

== Junior racing career ==
=== Formula 4 (2022–2023) ===
==== 2022 ====
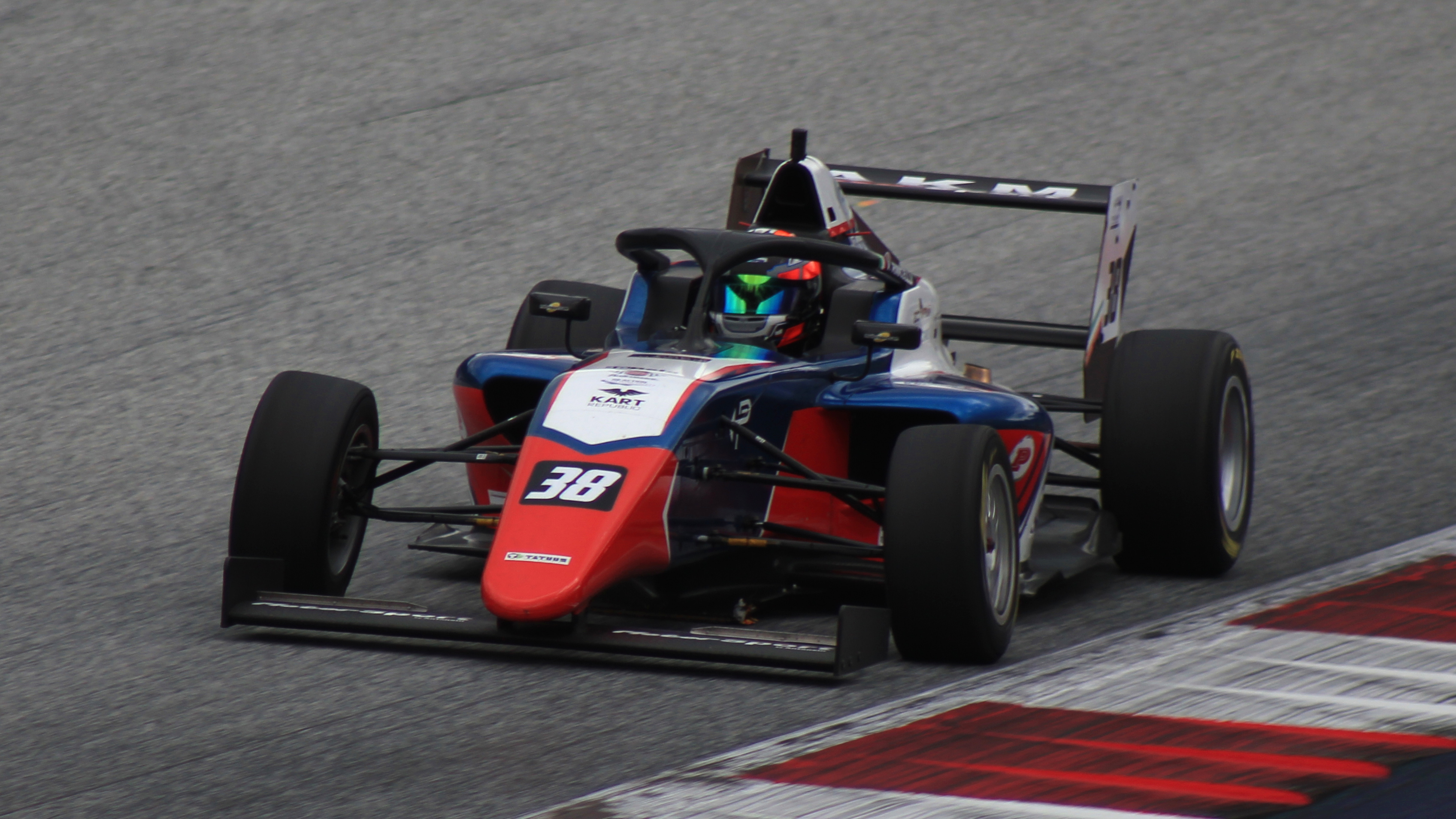
Rinicella racing in the 2022 Italian F4 Championship at the Red Bull Ring.

Rinicella made his single-seater debut during the 2022 Formula 4 UAE Championship. He failed to score any points and finished 26th in the standings.

For his main campaign, Rinicella signed with MP Motorsport to compete in the F4 Spanish Championship. His first podium came not too far away during the third race in Jerez. Rinicella had another third place in Spa-Francorchamps, those two being the only times he stood on the rostrum. His consistent points scoring secured him sixth in the championship.

Rinicella also competed in the 2022 Italian F4 Championship with AKM Motorsport from Spa-Francorchamps onwards. He failed to score points, finishing 33rd overall with a best finish of 12th.

==== 2023 ====
During his pre-season, Rinicella partook in the 2023 Formula 4 UAE Championship with MP Motorsport. He took a number of podiums, including a pole position. This was enough for fourth place in the championship.

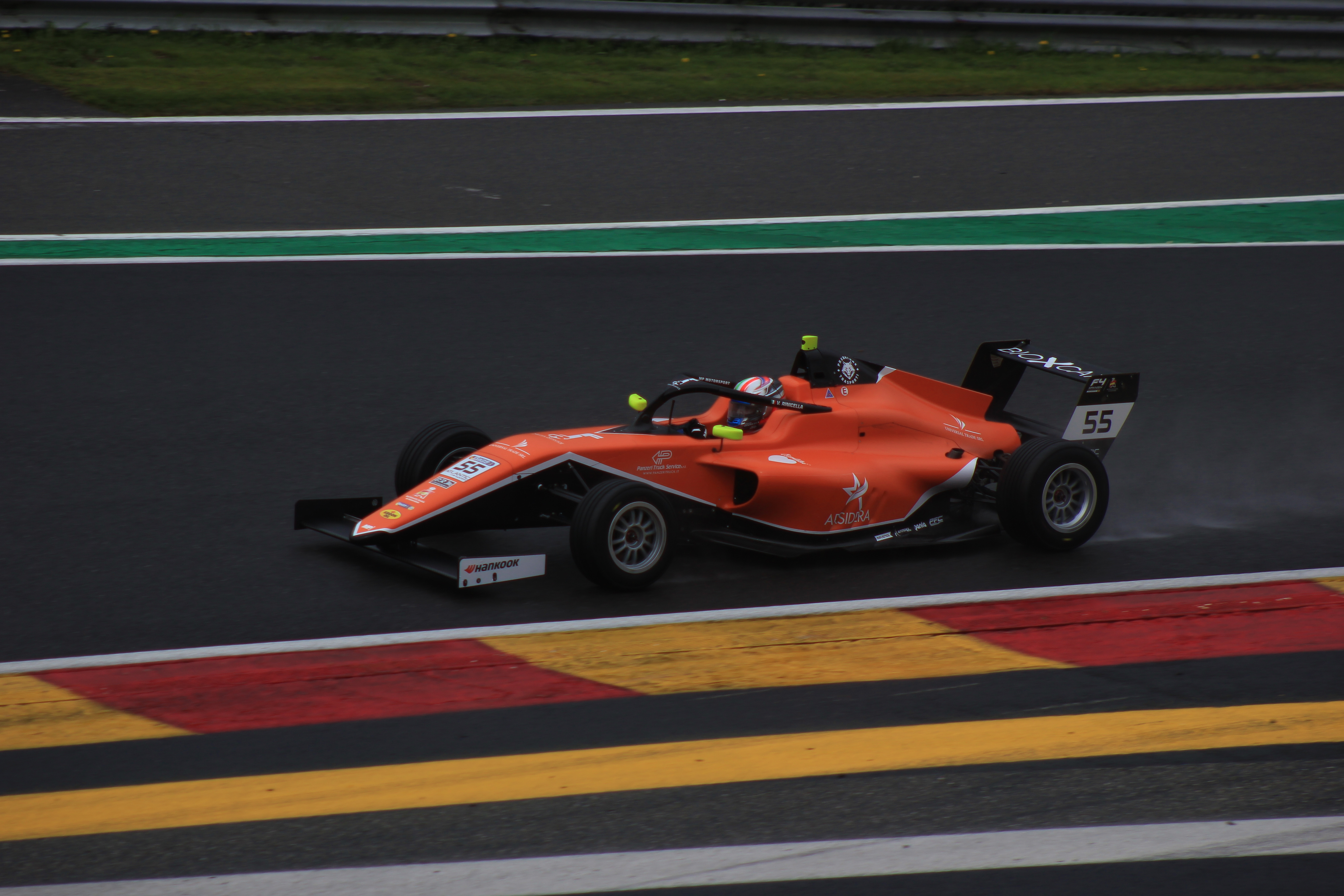
Rinicella racing at Spa-Francorchamps during the 2023 F4 Spanish Championship.

Rinicella's main campaign would again lie in the F4 Spanish Championship, where he remained with MP Motorsport. He started strong with a second place during the opening Spa-Francorchamps round, initially winning before being demoted due to a track limits penalty. It would not be long before he took his first win in the series in Navarra, where he also stood on the podium in all three races. He would win again at the Circuit Ricardo Tormo, by then he was an outside chance for the title. A triple podium during the Barcelona finale meant Rinicella finished third in the standings with a total of two wins and twelve podiums.

=== Formula Regional (2024–2025) ===
==== 2024 ====
Rinicella raced in the first two rounds of the pre-season Formula Regional Middle East Championship. He scored points in his last two races with seventh and sixth place, placing him 17th in the overall classification.

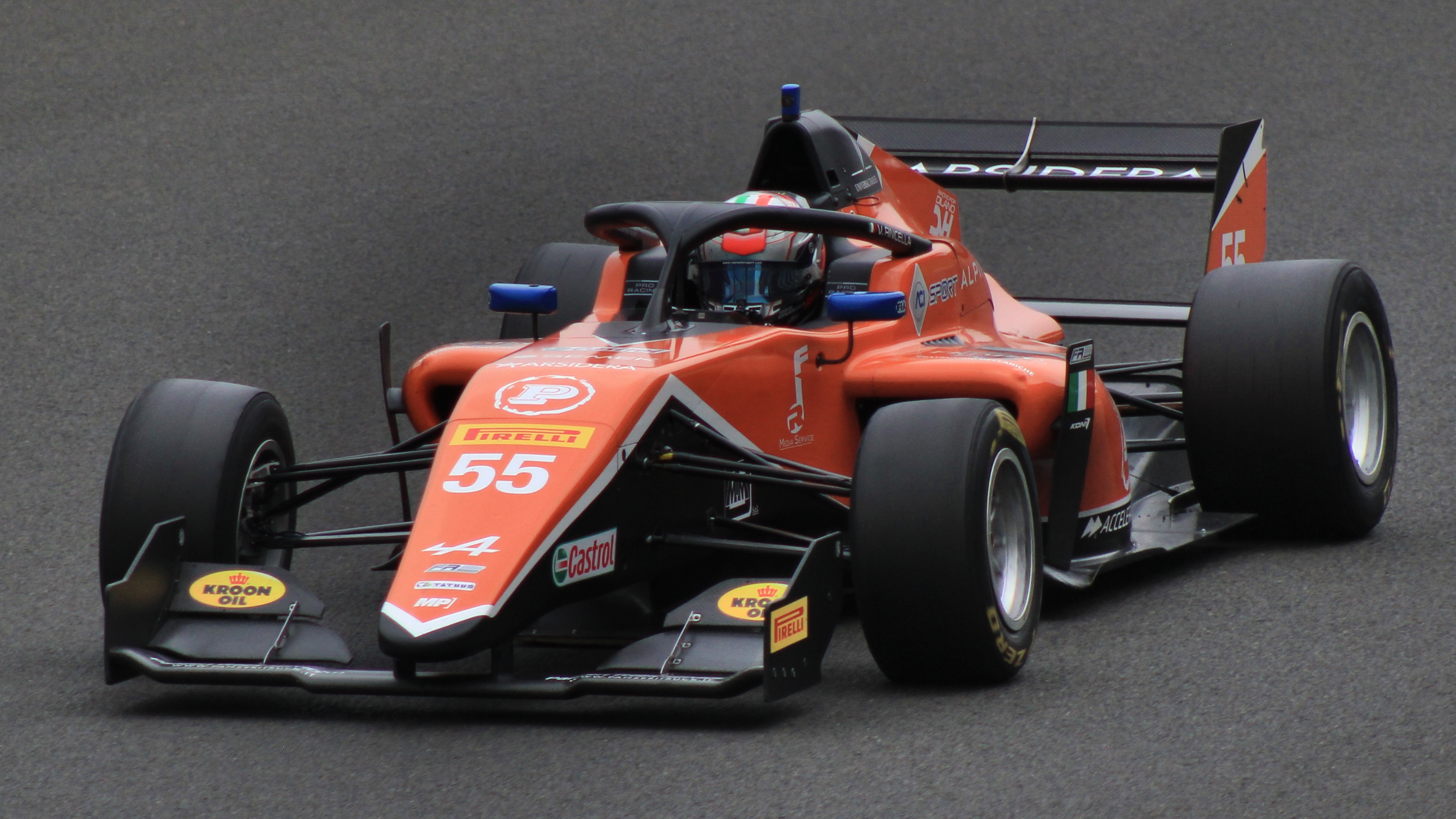
Rinicella driving at the Hungaroring during the 2024 Formula Regional European Championship

Rinicella graduated to the Formula Regional European Championship for 2024, sticking with MP Motorsport. He had a difficult campaign, but opened his account and had his first points finish during the eighth round at the Red Bull Ring. He scored another sixth place during the final round in Monza. Rinicella ended the year 20th in the standings with twelve points. That year, he also participated in the Macau Grand Prix with the team, and finished in a respectable 11th place.

==== 2025 ====
Rinicella joined CL Motorsport for the 2025 season, to take part in the opening round in Misano.

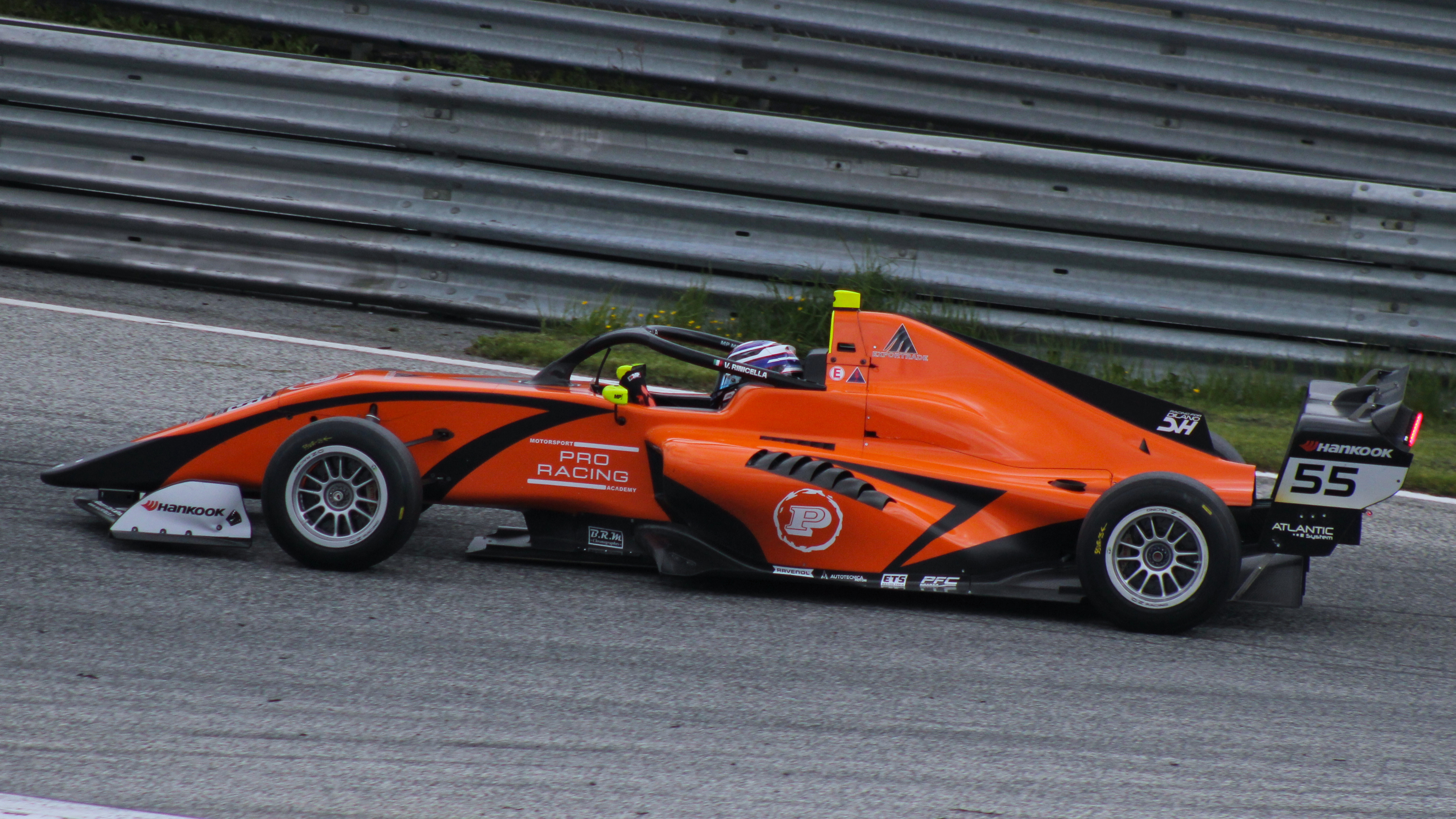
Rinicella driving at the Red Bull Ring during the 2025 Eurocup-3 season

For his main campaign, Rinicella moved to Eurocup-3, whilst sticking with MP Motorsport.

== Endurance racing career ==
=== 2025: Endurance debut ===
Rinicella made his sports car racing debut in the upcoming Asian Le Mans Series, taking part in the LMP2 class for Algarve Pro Racing alongside teammates Malthe Jakobsen and Michael Jensen.

=== 2026: Switch to ELMS ===
Rinicella concentrated on sportscar racing full-time in 2026, racing in the European Le Mans Series with IDEC Sport alongside Jamie Chadwick and Laurents Hörr in the LMP2 category.

== Karting record ==
=== Karting career summary ===
| Season | Series | Team | Position |
|---|---|---|---|
| 2018 | Italian Championship — 60 Mini | | 13th |
| 2019 | WSK Champions Cup — 60 Mini | Parolin Racing Kart | 27th |
| 2019 | WSK Super Master Series — 60 Mini | Parolin Racing Kart | 25th |
| 2019 | WSK Euro Series — 60 Mini | Parolin Racing Kart | 45th |
| 2019 | 24° South Garda Winter Cup — Mini ROK | Energy Corse | 13th |
| 2019 | ROK Cup Superfinal — Junior ROK | AV Racing | 30th |
| 2020 | WSK Super Master Series — OKJ | Parolin Racing Kart | 25th |
| 2020 | WSK Euro Series — OKJ | Parolin Racing Kart | 23rd |
| 2020 | WSK Open Cup — OKJ | Parolin Racing Kart | 32nd |
| 2021 | WSK Super Master Series — OK | | 26th |
| 2021 | WSK Euro Series — OK | | 37th |
| 2021 | Campionato Italiano ACI Karting — OK | | 2nd |

== Racing record ==
=== Racing career summary ===
| Season | Series | Team | Races | Wins | Poles | F/Laps | Podiums | Points | Position |
|---|---|---|---|---|---|---|---|---|---|
| 2022 | Formula 4 UAE Championship | MP Motorsport | 12 | 0 | 0 | 0 | 0 | 0 | 26th |
| 2022 | F4 Spanish Championship | MP Motorsport | 21 | 0 | 0 | 0 | 2 | 104 | 6th |
| 2022 | Italian F4 Championship | AKM Motorsport | 14 | 0 | 0 | 0 | 0 | 0 | 33rd |
| 2023 | Formula 4 UAE Championship | MP Motorsport | 15 | 0 | 1 | 0 | 6 | 171 | 4th |
| 2023 | F4 Spanish Championship | MP Motorsport | 21 | 2 | 4 | 4 | 12 | 256 | **3rd** |
| 2024 | Formula Regional Middle East Championship | MP Motorsport | 6 | 0 | 0 | 0 | 0 | 14 | 17th |
| 2024 | Formula Regional European Championship | MP Motorsport | 20 | 0 | 0 | 0 | 0 | 16 | 20th |
| 2024 | Macau Grand Prix | MP Motorsport | 1 | 0 | 0 | 0 | 0 | N/A | 11th |
| 2024-25 | Asian Le Mans Series - LMP2 | Algarve Pro Racing | 6 | 3 | 0 | 0 | 3 | 109 | **1st** |
| 2025 | Eurocup-3 Spanish Winter Championship | MP Motorsport | 5 | 1 | 2 | 3 | 3 | 70 | 5th |
| 2025 | Eurocup-3 | MP Motorsport | 18 | 1 | 0 | 2 | 9 | 221 | **2nd** |
| 2025 | Le Mans Cup - LMP3 | WTM by Rinaldi Racing | 0 | 0 | 0 | 0 | 0 | 0 | NC |
| 2025 | Formula Regional European Championship | CL Motorsport | 2 | 0 | 0 | 0 | 0 | 0 | 38th |
| 2026 | European Le Mans Series - LMP2 | IDEC Sport | 6 | 0 | 1 | 0 | 2 | 70 | **3rd** |
| 2026 | 24 Hours of Le Mans - LMP2 | IDEC Sport | 1 | 0 | 0 | 0 | 0 | N/A | 6th |

^{*} Season still in progress.

=== Complete Formula 4 UAE Championship results ===
(key) (Races in bold indicate pole position) (Races in italics indicate fastest lap)

| Year | Team | 1 | 2 | 3 | 4 | 5 | 6 | 7 | 8 | 9 | 10 | 11 | 12 | 13 | 14 | 15 | 16 | 17 | 18 | 19 | 20 | Pos | Points |
|---|---|---|---|---|---|---|---|---|---|---|---|---|---|---|---|---|---|---|---|---|---|---|---|
| 2022 | MP Motorsport | YMC1; 1 | YMC1; 2 | YMC1; 3 | YMC1; 4 | DUB1; 1 | DUB1; 2 | DUB1; 3 | DUB1; 4 | DUB2; 1 Ret | DUB2; 2 Ret | DUB2; 3; 11 | DUB2; 4; 18 | DUB3; 1; 14 | DUB3; 2; 15 | DUB3; 3 Ret | DUB3; 4; 13 | YMC2; 1; 15 | YMC2; 2; 17 | YMC2; 3 Ret | YMC2; 4; 17 | 26th | 0 |
| 2023 | MP Motorsport | DUB1; 1; 2 | DUB1; 2; 6 | DUB1; 3; 35 | **KMT1**; **1**; 2 | KMT1; 2; 4 | KMT1; 3; 2 | KMT2; 1; 4 | KMT2; 2; 3 | KMT2; 3; 2 | DUB2; 1; 6 | DUB2; 2; 6 | DUB2; 3; 5 | YMC; 1; 33† | YMC; 2; 6 | YMC; 3; 2 | | | | | | 4th | 171 |

=== Complete F4 Spanish Championship results ===
(key) (Races in bold indicate pole position) (Races in italics indicate fastest lap)

| Year | Team | 1 | 2 | 3 | 4 | 5 | 6 | 7 | 8 | 9 | 10 | 11 | 12 | 13 | 14 | 15 | 16 | 17 | 18 | 19 | 20 | 21 | DC | Points |
|---|---|---|---|---|---|---|---|---|---|---|---|---|---|---|---|---|---|---|---|---|---|---|---|---|
| 2022 | MP Motorsport | ALG; 1; 25 | ALG; 2; 8 | ALG; 3; 7 | JER; 1; 4 | JER; 2; 3 | JER; 3; 16 | CRT; 1; 10 | CRT; 2; 13 | CRT; 3; 10 | SPA; 1; 3 | SPA; 2; 4 | SPA; 3; 21 | ARA; 1 Ret | ARA; 2; 6 | ARA; 3; 5 | NAV; 1; 6 | NAV; 2; 7 | NAV; 3; 4 | CAT; 1; 10 | CAT; 2; 10 | CAT; 3; 5 | 6th | 104 |
| 2023 | MP Motorsport | SPA; 1; 19 | SPA; 2; 2 | **SPA**; **3**; 12 | ARA; 1; 4 | ARA; 2; 7 | ARA; 3; 7 | **NAV**; **1**; 2 | NAV; 2; 3 | **NAV**; **3**; 1 | JER; 1; 5 | JER; 2; 3 | JER; 3; 2 | EST; 1; 6 | EST; 2; 14 | EST; 3; 3 | CRT; 1; 1 | **CRT**; **2**; 2 | CRT; 3; 7 | CAT; 1; 2 | CAT; 2; 3 | CAT; 3; 3 | 3rd | 256 |

^{*} Season still in progress.

=== Complete Italian F4 Championship results ===
(key) (Races in bold indicate pole position) (Races in italics indicate fastest lap)

| Year | Team | 1 | 2 | 3 | 4 | 5 | 6 | 7 | 8 | 9 | 10 | 11 | 12 | 13 | 14 | 15 | 16 | 17 | 18 | 19 | 20 | 21 | 22 | DC | Points |
|---|---|---|---|---|---|---|---|---|---|---|---|---|---|---|---|---|---|---|---|---|---|---|---|---|---|
| 2022 | AKM Motorsport | IMO; 1 | IMO; 2 | IMO; 3 | MIS; 1 | MIS; 2 | MIS; 3 | SPA; 1; 16 | SPA; 2 Ret | SPA; 3; 23 | VLL; 1; 17 | VLL; 2; 16 | VLL; 3; 14 | RBR; 1 Ret | RBR; 2 | RBR; 3; 17 | RBR; 4; 33 | MNZ; 1; 38† | MNZ; 2; 12 | MNZ; 3 C | MUG; 1; 15 | MUG; 2; 17 | MUG; 3; 23 | 33rd | 0 |

=== Complete Formula Regional Middle East Championship results ===
(key) (Races in bold indicate pole position) (Races in italics indicate fastest lap)

| Year | Entrant | 1 | 2 | 3 | 4 | 5 | 6 | 7 | 8 | 9 | 10 | 11 | 12 | 13 | 14 | 15 | DC | Points |
|---|---|---|---|---|---|---|---|---|---|---|---|---|---|---|---|---|---|---|
| 2024 | MP Motorsport | YMC1; 1; 11 | YMC1; 2; 26† | YMC1; 3; 15 | YMC2; 1; 13 | YMC2; 2; 7 | YMC2; 3; 6 | DUB1; 1 | DUB1; 2 | DUB1; 3 | YMC3; 1 | YMC3; 2 | YMC3; 3 | DUB2; 1 | DUB2; 2 | DUB2; 3 | 17th | 14 |

=== Complete Formula Regional European Championship results ===
(key) (Races in bold indicate pole position) (Races in italics indicate fastest lap)

| Year | Team | 1 | 2 | 3 | 4 | 5 | 6 | 7 | 8 | 9 | 10 | 11 | 12 | 13 | 14 | 15 | 16 | 17 | 18 | 19 | 20 | DC | Points |
|---|---|---|---|---|---|---|---|---|---|---|---|---|---|---|---|---|---|---|---|---|---|---|---|
| 2024 | MP Motorsport | HOC; 1; 14 | HOC; 2; 20 | SPA; 1; 14 | SPA; 2; 14 | ZAN; 1 Ret | ZAN; 2; 27 | HUN; 1; 11 | HUN; 2; 19 | MUG; 1; 15 | MUG; 2; 15 | LEC; 1; 13 | LEC; 2; 12 | IMO; 1; 13 | IMO; 2; 19 | RBR; 1; 6 | RBR; 2 Ret | CAT; 1; 13 | CAT; 2; 15 | MNZ; 1; 6 | MNZ; 2; 12 | 20th | 16 |
| 2025 | CL Motorsport | MIS; 1; 20 | MIS; 2 Ret | SPA; 1 | SPA; 2 | ZAN; 1 | ZAN; 2 | HUN; 1 | HUN; 2 | LEC; 1 | LEC; 2 | IMO; 1 | IMO; 2 | RBR; 1 | RBR; 2 | CAT; 1 | CAT; 2 | HOC; 1 | HOC; 2 | MNZ; 1 | MNZ; 2 | 38th | 0 |

=== Complete Macau Grand Prix results ===
| Year | Team | Car | Qualifying | Quali Race | Main race |
|---|---|---|---|---|---|
| 2024 | (Netherlands) MP Motorsport | Tatuus F3 T-318 | 16th | 14th | 11th |

=== Complete Asian Le Mans Series results ===
(key) (Races in bold indicate pole position) (Races in italics indicate fastest lap)

| Year | Team | Class | Car | Engine | 1 | 2 | 3 | 4 | 5 | 6 | Pos. | Points |
|---|---|---|---|---|---|---|---|---|---|---|---|---|
| 2024–25 | Algarve Pro Racing | LMP2 | Oreca 07 | Gibson GK428 4.2 L V8 | SEP; 1; 4 | SEP; 2; 1 | DUB; 1; 1 | DUB; 2; 5 | ABU; 1; 1 | ABU; 2; 4 | 1st | 109 |

=== Complete Eurocup-3 Spanish Winter Championship results ===
(key) (Races in bold indicate pole position) (Races in italics indicate fastest lap)

| Year | Team | 1 | 2 | 3 | 4 | 5 | 6 | 7 | 8 | DC | Points |
|---|---|---|---|---|---|---|---|---|---|---|---|
| 2025 | MP Motorsport | JER; 1 | JER; 2 | JER; 3 | **POR**; **1**; 1 | POR; 2; 3 | **POR**; **3**; 2 | ARA; 1; 13 | ARA; 2; 7 | 5th | 70 |

=== Complete Eurocup-3 results ===
(key) (Races in bold indicate pole position) (Races in italics indicate fastest lap)

| Year | Team | 1 | 2 | 3 | 4 | 5 | 6 | 7 | 8 | 9 | 10 | 11 | 12 | 13 | 14 | 15 | 16 | 17 | 18 | DC | Points |
|---|---|---|---|---|---|---|---|---|---|---|---|---|---|---|---|---|---|---|---|---|---|
| 2025 | MP Motorsport | RBR; 1; 6 | RBR; 2; 4 | POR; 1; 5 | POR; SR; 3 | POR; 2; 5 | LEC; 1; 2 | LEC; SR; 5 | LEC; 2; 2 | MNZ; 1; 3 | MNZ; 2; 2 | ASS; 1; 1 | ASS; 2; 3 | SPA; 1; 22 | SPA; 2 Ret | JER; 1; 4 | JER; 2; 6 | CAT; 1; 2 | CAT; 2; 2 | 2nd | 221 |

=== Complete European Le Mans Series results ===
(key) (Races in bold indicate pole position; results in italics indicate fastest lap)

| Year | Entrant | Class | Chassis | Engine | 1 | 2 | 3 | 4 | 5 | 6 | Rank | Points |
|---|---|---|---|---|---|---|---|---|---|---|---|---|
| 2026 | IDEC Sport | LMP2 | Oreca 07 | Gibson GK428 4.2 L V8 | CAT; 4 | LEC; 4 | IMO; 4 | SPA; 3 | SIL; 11 | ALG; 2 | 3rd | 70 |

=== Complete 24 Hours of Le Mans results ===
| Year | Team | Co-Drivers | Car | Class | Laps | Pos. | Class Pos. |
|---|---|---|---|---|---|---|---|
| 2026 | (France) IDEC Sport | (France) Paul Lafargue (Netherlands) Job van Uitert | Oreca 07-Gibson | LMP2 | 359 | 20th | 6th |
