= 2024–25 Asian Le Mans Series =

Sports car racing series

The 2024–25 Asian Le Mans Series was the thirteenth season of the Automobile Club de l'Ouest's Asian Le Mans Series. It is the fourth 24 Hours of Le Mans-based series created by the ACO, following the American Le Mans Series (since merged with the Rolex Sports Car Series to form the United SportsCar Championship), the European Le Mans Series and the FIA World Endurance Championship. The six-event season began at the Sepang International Circuit in Sepang on 6 December 2024 and concluded at the Yas Marina Circuit in Abu Dhabi on 16 February 2025.

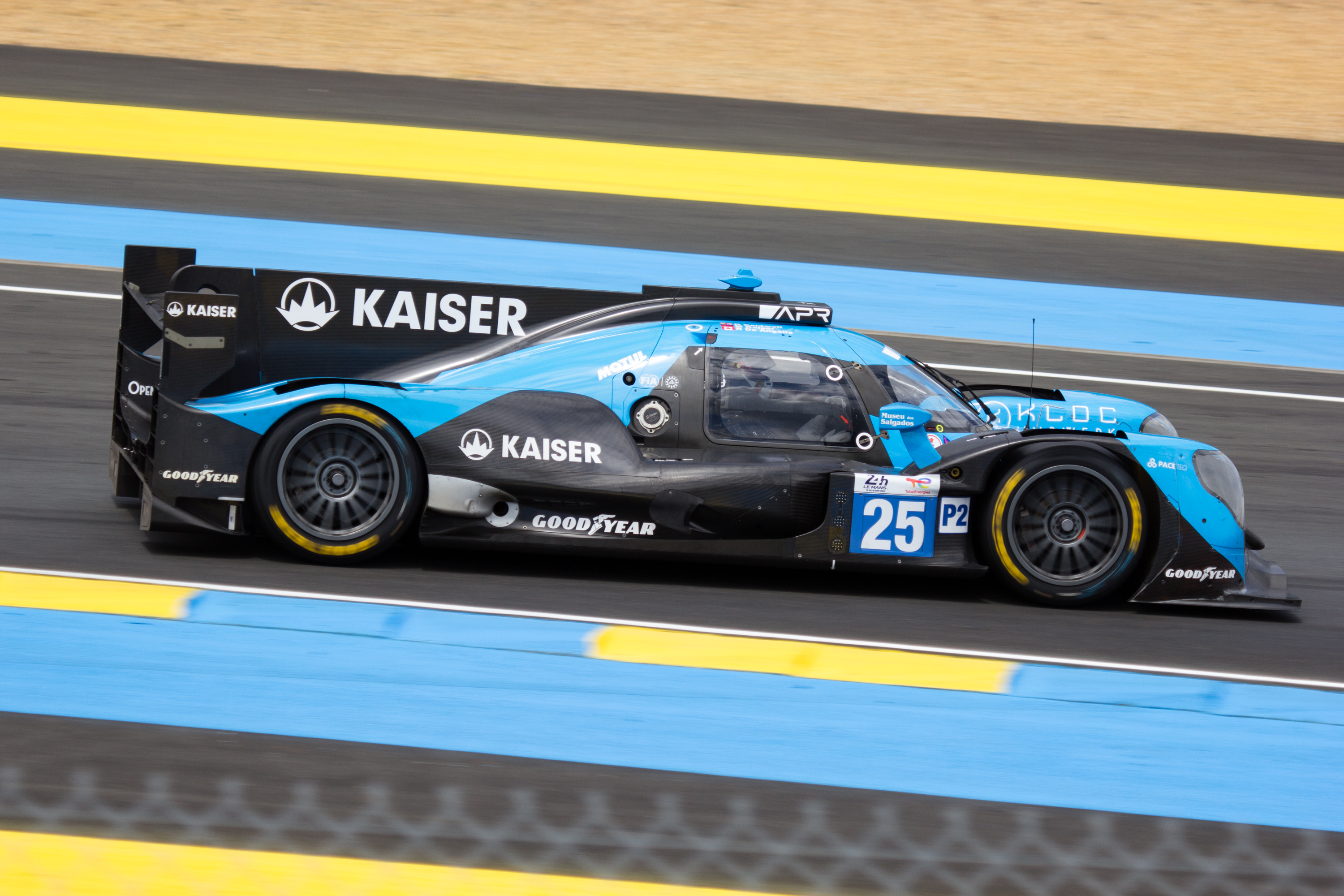
The No. 25 Algarve Pro Racing car won the LMP2 Teams' and Drivers' championship titles (pictured at the 2024 24 Hours of Le Mans).

== Calendar ==
The calendar for the 2024–25 season was announced on the official website 22 April 2024. The first two races were held at the Sepang International Circuit in December 2024, before moving to United Arab Emirates at the Dubai Autodrome in Dubai and Yas Marina Circuit in Abu Dhabi in February 2025.

The season comprises six four-hour length races, run on the three circuits.

Rnd	Race	Circuit	Location	Date
1	4 Hours of Sepang	(Malaysia) Sepang International Circuit	Sepang, Selangor, Malaysia	7 December 2024
2	4 Hours of Sepang	(Malaysia) Sepang International Circuit	Sepang, Selangor, Malaysia	8 December 2024
3	4 Hours of Dubai	(United Arab Emirates) Dubai Autodrome	Dubailand, Dubai, UAE	8 February 2025
4	4 Hours of Dubai	(United Arab Emirates) Dubai Autodrome	Dubailand, Dubai, UAE	9 February 2025
5	4 Hours of Abu Dhabi	(United Arab Emirates) Yas Marina Circuit	Yas Island, Abu Dhabi, UAE	15 February 2025
6	4 Hours of Abu Dhabi	(United Arab Emirates) Yas Marina Circuit	Yas Island, Abu Dhabi, UAE	16 February 2025
Map of circuit locations
2024–25 Asian Le Mans Series is located in Asia

== Entry list ==
=== LMP2 ===
All cars in the LMP2 class use the Gibson GK428 V8 engine and Michelin tyres.

Entrant/Team	Car	No.	Drivers	Rounds
(Luxembourg) DKR Engineering	Oreca 07	3	(Germany) Laurents Hörr	All
(Luxembourg) DKR Engineering	Oreca 07	3	(Greece) Georgios Kolovos	All
(Luxembourg) DKR Engineering	Oreca 07	3	(Netherlands) Job van Uitert	All
(Germany) Proton Competition	Oreca 07	11	(Switzerland) Mathias Beche	All
(Germany) Proton Competition	Oreca 07	11	(Germany) Alexander Mattschull	All
(Germany) Proton Competition	Oreca 07	11	(Germany) Jonas Ried	All
(Germany) Proton Competition	Oreca 07	22	(France) Tom Dillmann	All
(Germany) Proton Competition	Oreca 07	22	Vladislav Lomko (Note: Lomko, Shaytar, Stolyarov and Salikhov are Russian, but they compete as neutral competitors as Russian national emblems were banned by the FIA following the Russian invasion of Ukraine. Bukhantsov, also a Russian, competes under a Kittitian licence for the same reason.)	All
(Germany) Proton Competition	Oreca 07	22	(Italy) Giorgio Roda	All
(Portugal) Algarve Pro Racing	Oreca 07	20	(United Kingdom) Olli Caldwell	All
(Portugal) Algarve Pro Racing	Oreca 07	20	(Greece) Kriton Lendoudis	All
(Portugal) Algarve Pro Racing	Oreca 07	20	(United Kingdom) Alex Quinn	All
(Portugal) Algarve Pro Racing	Oreca 07	25	(Denmark) Malthe Jakobsen	All
(Portugal) Algarve Pro Racing	Oreca 07	25	(Denmark) Michael Jensen	All
(Portugal) Algarve Pro Racing	Oreca 07	25	(Italy) Valerio Rinicella	All
(United Kingdom) Nielsen Racing	Oreca 07	24	(United Kingdom) Matt Bell	All
(United Kingdom) Nielsen Racing	Oreca 07	24	(Netherlands) Nicky Catsburg	All
(United Kingdom) Nielsen Racing	Oreca 07	24	(United States) Naveen Rao	All
(France) RD Limited	Oreca 07	30	(Australia) James Allen	All
(France) RD Limited	Oreca 07	30	(United States) Fred Poordad	All
(France) RD Limited	Oreca 07	30	(France) Tristan Vautier	All
(Italy) AF Corse	Oreca 07	50	(United States) Patrick Byrne	All
(Italy) AF Corse	Oreca 07	50	(United States) Jeremy Clarke	All
(Italy) AF Corse	Oreca 07	50	(France) Olivier Pla	All
(Italy) AF Corse	Oreca 07	83	(France) François Perrodo	All
(Italy) AF Corse	Oreca 07	83	(Italy) Alessio Rovera	All
(Italy) AF Corse	Oreca 07	83	(France) Matthieu Vaxivière	All
(Lithuania) Pure Rxcing	Oreca 07	91	(United Kingdom) Harry King	All
(Lithuania) Pure Rxcing	Oreca 07	91	(Saint Kitts and Nevis) Alex Malykhin (Note: Malykhin is Belarusian, but he competes under a Kittitian licence as Belarusian national emblems were banned by the FIA following the Russian invasion of Ukraine.)	All
(Lithuania) Pure Rxcing	Oreca 07	91	(Switzerland) Louis Delétraz	1–2
(Lithuania) Pure Rxcing	Oreca 07	91	(France) Julien Andlauer	3–6

- Inter Europol Competition was scheduled to enter an Oreca 07, but altered its plans prior to the start of the season, replacing it with a second LMP3 entry.
- Paul Lanchère was scheduled to compete for Proton Competition, but did not appear at any rounds. He was replaced by Alexander Mattschull.

=== LMP3 ===
All cars in the LMP3 class use the Nissan VK56DE 5.6 L V8 engine and Michelin tyres.

Entrant/Team	Car	No.	Drivers	Rounds
(Switzerland) Graff Racing	Ligier JS P320	7	(Saint Kitts and Nevis) Alexander Bukhantsov	All
(Switzerland) Graff Racing	Ligier JS P320	7	(Singapore) Danial Frost	All
(Switzerland) Graff Racing	Ligier JS P320	7	(United Kingdom) James Winslow	All
(United Kingdom) RLR MSport	Ligier JS P320	15	(United Kingdom) Nick Adcock	All
(United Kingdom) RLR MSport	Ligier JS P320	15	(Mexico) Ian Aguilera	All
(United Kingdom) RLR MSport	Ligier JS P320	15	(Canada) James Dayson	1–2
(United Kingdom) RLR MSport	Ligier JS P320	15	(United Kingdom) Chris Short	3–6
(Czech Republic) Bretton Racing	Ligier JS P320	26	(Denmark) Theodor Jensen	All
(Czech Republic) Bretton Racing	Ligier JS P320	26	(Denmark) Jens Reno Møller	All
(Czech Republic) Bretton Racing	Ligier JS P320	26	(Czech Republic) Dan Skočdopole	1–2
(Czech Republic) Bretton Racing	Ligier JS P320	26	(Australia) Griffin Peebles	3–6
(Poland) Inter Europol Competition	Ligier JS P320	34	(Canada) Daniel Ali	All
(Poland) Inter Europol Competition	Ligier JS P320	34	(United Kingdom) Tim Creswick	All
(Poland) Inter Europol Competition	Ligier JS P320	34	(Belgium) Douwe Dedecker	All
(Poland) Inter Europol Competition	Ligier JS P320	43	(New Zealand) Steve Brooks	All
(Poland) Inter Europol Competition	Ligier JS P320	43	(Denmark) Mikkel Kristensen	All
(Poland) Inter Europol Competition	Ligier JS P320	43	(Switzerland) Kévin Rabin	All
(France) Ultimate	Ligier JS P320	35	(Italy) Matteo Quintarelli	All
(France) Ultimate	Ligier JS P320	35	(Belgium) Stéphane Lémeret	1–2
(France) Ultimate	Ligier JS P320	35	(Hungary) Bence Válint	1–2
(France) Ultimate	Ligier JS P320	35	(Italy) Leonardo Colavita	3–6
(France) Ultimate	Ligier JS P320	35	(France) Louis Stern	3–6
(Denmark) High Class Racing	Ligier JS P320	49	(Denmark) Anders Fjordbach	All
(Denmark) High Class Racing	Ligier JS P320	49	(United States) Mark Patterson	All
(Denmark) High Class Racing	Ligier JS P320	49	(United States) Seth Lucas	1–2
(Denmark) High Class Racing	Ligier JS P320	49	(Germany) Thomas Kiefer	3–6

- Filipino team Eurasia Motorsport was set to return to LMP3 competition after a six-year absence, but did not make the final entry list.

=== GT ===
Entrant/Team	Car	Engine	No.	Drivers	Rounds
(China) Climax Racing	Mercedes-AMG GT3 Evo	Mercedes-AMG M159 6.2 L V8	2	(Estonia) Ralf Aron	All
(China) Climax Racing	Mercedes-AMG GT3 Evo	Mercedes-AMG M159 6.2 L V8	2	(Finland) Elias Seppänen	All
(China) Climax Racing	Mercedes-AMG GT3 Evo	Mercedes-AMG M159 6.2 L V8	2	(China) Zhou Bihuang	All
(China) Climax Racing	Mercedes-AMG GT3 Evo	Mercedes-AMG M159 6.2 L V8	14	(Austria) Lucas Auer	All
(China) Climax Racing	Mercedes-AMG GT3 Evo	Mercedes-AMG M159 6.2 L V8	14	(China) Ling Kang	All
(China) Climax Racing	Mercedes-AMG GT3 Evo	Mercedes-AMG M159 6.2 L V8	14	(China) Lu Wei	All
(United Arab Emirates) Dragon Racing	Ferrari 296 GT3	Ferrari F163 3.0 L Turbo V6	8	(United States) Todd Coleman	3–6
(United Arab Emirates) Dragon Racing	Ferrari 296 GT3	Ferrari F163 3.0 L Turbo V6	8	(United Kingdom) Lorcan Hanafin	3–6
(United Arab Emirates) Dragon Racing	Ferrari 296 GT3	Ferrari F163 3.0 L Turbo V6	8	(United States) Aaron Telitz	3–6
(United Arab Emirates) Dragon Racing	Ferrari 296 GT3	Ferrari F163 3.0 L Turbo V6	88	(Italy) Giacomo Altoè	3–6
(United Arab Emirates) Dragon Racing	Ferrari 296 GT3	Ferrari F163 3.0 L Turbo V6	88	(Italy) Nicola Marinangeli	3–6
(United Arab Emirates) Dragon Racing	Ferrari 296 GT3	Ferrari F163 3.0 L Turbo V6	88	(Italy) Marco Pulcini	3–6
(Germany) GetSpeed Performance	Mercedes-AMG GT3 Evo	Mercedes-AMG M159 6.2 L V8	9	(United States) Anthony Bartone	All
(Germany) GetSpeed Performance	Mercedes-AMG GT3 Evo	Mercedes-AMG M159 6.2 L V8	9	(Luxembourg) Steve Jans	All
(Germany) GetSpeed Performance	Mercedes-AMG GT3 Evo	Mercedes-AMG M159 6.2 L V8	9	(Germany) Fabian Schiller	All
(Germany) Manthey Racing	Porsche 911 GT3 R (992)	Porsche M97/80 4.2 L Flat-6	10	(Hong Kong) Antares Au	All
(Germany) Manthey Racing	Porsche 911 GT3 R (992)	Porsche M97/80 4.2 L Flat-6	10	(Austria) Klaus Bachler	All
(Germany) Manthey Racing	Porsche 911 GT3 R (992)	Porsche M97/80 4.2 L Flat-6	10	(Germany) Joel Sturm	All
(Germany) Manthey EMA	Porsche 911 GT3 R (992)	Porsche M97/80 4.2 L Flat-6	92	(United States) Ryan Hardwick	All
(Germany) Manthey EMA	Porsche 911 GT3 R (992)	Porsche M97/80 4.2 L Flat-6	92	(Austria) Richard Lietz	All
(Germany) Manthey EMA	Porsche 911 GT3 R (992)	Porsche M97/80 4.2 L Flat-6	92	(Italy) Riccardo Pera	All
(Germany) Car Collection Motorsport	Porsche 911 GT3 R (992)	Porsche M97/80 4.2 L Flat-6	12	(United Kingdom) James Kell	All
(Germany) Car Collection Motorsport	Porsche 911 GT3 R (992)	Porsche M97/80 4.2 L Flat-6	12	(Canada) Bashar Mardini	All
(Germany) Car Collection Motorsport	Porsche 911 GT3 R (992)	Porsche M97/80 4.2 L Flat-6	12	(Germany) Nico Menzel	All
(Germany) Car Collection Motorsport	Porsche 911 GT3 R (992)	Porsche M97/80 4.2 L Flat-6	21	(Switzerland) Alex Fontana	All
(Germany) Car Collection Motorsport	Porsche 911 GT3 R (992)	Porsche M97/80 4.2 L Flat-6	21	(United States) 'Hash'	All
(Germany) Car Collection Motorsport	Porsche 911 GT3 R (992)	Porsche M97/80 4.2 L Flat-6	21	(Switzerland) Yannick Mettler	All
(Germany) Winward Racing	Mercedes-AMG GT3 Evo	Mercedes-AMG M159 6.2 L V8	16	(Germany) Maro Engel	All
(Germany) Winward Racing	Mercedes-AMG GT3 Evo	Mercedes-AMG M159 6.2 L V8	16	Viktor Shaytar	All
(Germany) Winward Racing	Mercedes-AMG GT3 Evo	Mercedes-AMG M159 6.2 L V8	16	Sergey Stolyarov	All
(Germany) Winward Racing	Mercedes-AMG GT3 Evo	Mercedes-AMG M159 6.2 L V8	81	(Italy) Gabriele Piana	All
(Germany) Winward Racing	Mercedes-AMG GT3 Evo	Mercedes-AMG M159 6.2 L V8	81	Rinat Salikhov	All
(Germany) Winward Racing	Mercedes-AMG GT3 Evo	Mercedes-AMG M159 6.2 L V8	81	(Andorra) Jules Gounon	1–2
(Germany) Winward Racing	Mercedes-AMG GT3 Evo	Mercedes-AMG M159 6.2 L V8	81	(Germany) Luca Stolz	3–6
(United Kingdom) Blackthorn	Aston Martin Vantage AMR GT3 Evo	Aston Martin M177 4.0 L Twin-Turbo V8	19	(United Kingdom) Jason Ambrose	1–2
(United Kingdom) Blackthorn	Aston Martin Vantage AMR GT3 Evo	Aston Martin M177 4.0 L Twin-Turbo V8	19	(Switzerland) Claude Bovet	1–2
(United Kingdom) Blackthorn	Aston Martin Vantage AMR GT3 Evo	Aston Martin M177 4.0 L Twin-Turbo V8	19	(United Kingdom) David McDonald	1–2
(United Kingdom) Blackthorn	Aston Martin Vantage AMR GT3 Evo	Aston Martin M177 4.0 L Twin-Turbo V8	19	(United Kingdom) Jonathan Adam	3–6
(United Kingdom) Blackthorn	Aston Martin Vantage AMR GT3 Evo	Aston Martin M177 4.0 L Twin-Turbo V8	19	(United Kingdom) Charles Bateman	3–6
(United Kingdom) Blackthorn	Aston Martin Vantage AMR GT3 Evo	Aston Martin M177 4.0 L Twin-Turbo V8	19	(Saudi Arabia) Reema Juffali	3–4
(United Kingdom) Blackthorn	Aston Martin Vantage AMR GT3 Evo	Aston Martin M177 4.0 L Twin-Turbo V8	19	(Italy) Giacomo Petrobelli	5–6
(Hong Kong) Absolute Racing	Ferrari 296 GT3	Ferrari F163 3.0 L Turbo V6	23	(Thailand) Carl Bennett	All
(Hong Kong) Absolute Racing	Ferrari 296 GT3	Ferrari F163 3.0 L Turbo V6	23	(United States) Gregory Bennett	All
(Hong Kong) Absolute Racing	Ferrari 296 GT3	Ferrari F163 3.0 L Turbo V6	23	(New Zealand) Chris van der Drift	All
(United Kingdom) Optimum Motorsport	McLaren 720S GT3 Evo	McLaren M840T 4.0 L Turbo V8	27	(United Kingdom) Andrew Gilbert	All
(United Kingdom) Optimum Motorsport	McLaren 720S GT3 Evo	McLaren M840T 4.0 L Turbo V8	27	(Germany) Benjamin Goethe	All
(United Kingdom) Optimum Motorsport	McLaren 720S GT3 Evo	McLaren M840T 4.0 L Turbo V8	27	(Spain) Fran Rueda	All
(United Kingdom) Optimum Motorsport	McLaren 720S GT3 Evo	McLaren M840T 4.0 L Turbo V8	77	(United Kingdom) Tom Ikin	All
(United Kingdom) Optimum Motorsport	McLaren 720S GT3 Evo	McLaren M840T 4.0 L Turbo V8	77	(United Kingdom) Morgan Tillbrook	All
(United Kingdom) Optimum Motorsport	McLaren 720S GT3 Evo	McLaren M840T 4.0 L Turbo V8	77	(United Kingdom) Tom Gamble	1–2
(United Kingdom) Optimum Motorsport	McLaren 720S GT3 Evo	McLaren M840T 4.0 L Turbo V8	77	(Germany) Marvin Kirchhöfer	3–6
(Italy) AF Corse	Ferrari 296 GT3	Ferrari F163 3.0 L Turbo V6	28	(United States) Manny Franco	All
(Italy) AF Corse	Ferrari 296 GT3	Ferrari F163 3.0 L Turbo V6	28	(Italy) Davide Rigon	All
(Italy) AF Corse	Ferrari 296 GT3	Ferrari F163 3.0 L Turbo V6	28	(Italy) Massimiliano Wiser	All
(Italy) AF Corse	Ferrari 296 GT3	Ferrari F163 3.0 L Turbo V6	51	(Italy) Riccardo Agostini	All
(Italy) AF Corse	Ferrari 296 GT3	Ferrari F163 3.0 L Turbo V6	51	(Monaco) Cédric Sbirrazzuoli	All
(Italy) AF Corse	Ferrari 296 GT3	Ferrari F163 3.0 L Turbo V6	51	(Brazil) Custodio Toledo	All
(Italy) AF Corse	Ferrari 296 GT3	Ferrari F163 3.0 L Turbo V6	82	(Denmark) Conrad Laursen	All
(Italy) AF Corse	Ferrari 296 GT3	Ferrari F163 3.0 L Turbo V6	82	(France) Charles-Henri Samani	All
(Italy) AF Corse	Ferrari 296 GT3	Ferrari F163 3.0 L Turbo V6	82	(Argentina) Nicolás Varrone	All
(New Zealand) Prime Speed Sport	Lamborghini Huracán GT3 Evo 2	Lamborghini DGF 5.2 L V10	42	(Australia) Nick Foster	All
(New Zealand) Prime Speed Sport	Lamborghini Huracán GT3 Evo 2	Lamborghini DGF 5.2 L V10	42	(New Zealand) Jono Lester	All
(New Zealand) Prime Speed Sport	Lamborghini Huracán GT3 Evo 2	Lamborghini DGF 5.2 L V10	42	(New Zealand) René Heremana Malmezac	All
(Qatar) QMMF by Herberth	Porsche 911 GT3 R (992)	Porsche M97/80 4.2 L Flat-6	46	(Qatar) Ibrahim Al-Abdulghani	3–6
(Qatar) QMMF by Herberth	Porsche 911 GT3 R (992)	Porsche M97/80 4.2 L Flat-6	46	(Qatar) Abdulla Ali Al-Khelaifi	3–6
(Qatar) QMMF by Herberth	Porsche 911 GT3 R (992)	Porsche M97/80 4.2 L Flat-6	46	(Qatar) Ghanim Ali Al-Maadheed	3–6
(Germany) Herberth Motorsport	Porsche 911 GT3 R (992)	Porsche M97/80 4.2 L Flat-6	99	(Germany) Ralf Bohn	3–6
(Germany) Herberth Motorsport	Porsche 911 GT3 R (992)	Porsche M97/80 4.2 L Flat-6	99	(Germany) Alfred Renauer	3–6
(Germany) Herberth Motorsport	Porsche 911 GT3 R (992)	Porsche M97/80 4.2 L Flat-6	99	(Germany) Robert Renauer	3–6
(Japan) Car Guy Racing	Ferrari 296 GT3	Ferrari F163 3.0 L Turbo V6	57	(Brazil) Daniel Serra	All
(Japan) Car Guy Racing	Ferrari 296 GT3	Ferrari F163 3.0 L Turbo V6	57	(France) Esteban Masson	1–2
(Japan) Car Guy Racing	Ferrari 296 GT3	Ferrari F163 3.0 L Turbo V6	57	(Japan) Yudai Uchida	1–2
(Japan) Car Guy Racing	Ferrari 296 GT3	Ferrari F163 3.0 L Turbo V6	57	(Japan) Takeshi Kimura	3–6
(Japan) Car Guy Racing	Ferrari 296 GT3	Ferrari F163 3.0 L Turbo V6	57	(United Kingdom) Casper Stevenson	3–6
(Switzerland) Kessel Racing	Ferrari 296 GT3	Ferrari F163 3.0 L Turbo V6	74	(United States) Dustin Blattner	All
(Switzerland) Kessel Racing	Ferrari 296 GT3	Ferrari F163 3.0 L Turbo V6	74	(Germany) Dennis Marschall	All
(Switzerland) Kessel Racing	Ferrari 296 GT3	Ferrari F163 3.0 L Turbo V6	74	(United Kingdom) Ben Tuck	All
(Germany) Proton Competition	Porsche 911 GT3 R (992)	Porsche M97/80 4.2 L Flat-6	60	(Italy) Matteo Cressoni	All
(Germany) Proton Competition	Porsche 911 GT3 R (992)	Porsche M97/80 4.2 L Flat-6	60	(Belgium) Alessio Picariello	All
(Germany) Proton Competition	Porsche 911 GT3 R (992)	Porsche M97/80 4.2 L Flat-6	60	(Italy) Claudio Schiavoni	All
(Italy) Iron Dames	Porsche 911 GT3 R (992)	Porsche M97/80 4.2 L Flat-6	85	(Belgium) Sarah Bovy	All
(Italy) Iron Dames	Porsche 911 GT3 R (992)	Porsche M97/80 4.2 L Flat-6	85	(Denmark) Michelle Gatting	All
(Italy) Iron Dames	Porsche 911 GT3 R (992)	Porsche M97/80 4.2 L Flat-6	85	(France) Célia Martin	All
(San Marino) Tsunami RT	Porsche 911 GT3 R (992)	Porsche M97/80 4.2 L Flat-6	79	(Italy) Fabio Babini	All
(San Marino) Tsunami RT	Porsche 911 GT3 R (992)	Porsche M97/80 4.2 L Flat-6	79	(New Zealand) Daniel Gaunt	All
(San Marino) Tsunami RT	Porsche 911 GT3 R (992)	Porsche M97/80 4.2 L Flat-6	79	(Italy) Johannes Zelger	All
(China) Origine Motorsport	Porsche 911 GT3 R (992)	Porsche M97/80 4.2 L Flat-6	87	(Germany) Laurin Heinrich	All
(China) Origine Motorsport	Porsche 911 GT3 R (992)	Porsche M97/80 4.2 L Flat-6	87	(China) Leo Ye Hongli	All
(China) Origine Motorsport	Porsche 911 GT3 R (992)	Porsche M97/80 4.2 L Flat-6	87	(China) Bo Yuan	All
(New Zealand) Earl Bamber Motorsport	Aston Martin Vantage AMR GT3 Evo	Aston Martin M177 4.0 L Twin-Turbo V8	89	(New Zealand) Brendon Leitch	1–2
(New Zealand) Earl Bamber Motorsport	Aston Martin Vantage AMR GT3 Evo	Aston Martin M177 4.0 L Twin-Turbo V8	89	(Denmark) Marco Sørensen	1–2
(New Zealand) Earl Bamber Motorsport	Aston Martin Vantage AMR GT3 Evo	Aston Martin M177 4.0 L Twin-Turbo V8	89	(Indonesia) Anderson Tanoto	1–2
(New Zealand) Earl Bamber Motorsport	Aston Martin Vantage AMR GT3 Evo	Aston Martin M177 4.0 L Twin-Turbo V8	89	(United Kingdom) Jamie Day	3–6
(New Zealand) Earl Bamber Motorsport	Aston Martin Vantage AMR GT3 Evo	Aston Martin M177 4.0 L Twin-Turbo V8	89	(Italy) Mattia Drudi	3–6
(New Zealand) Earl Bamber Motorsport	Aston Martin Vantage AMR GT3 Evo	Aston Martin M177 4.0 L Twin-Turbo V8	89	(Luxembourg) Gabriel Rindone	3–6
(New Zealand) Earl Bamber Motorsport	Aston Martin Vantage AMR GT3 Evo	Aston Martin M177 4.0 L Twin-Turbo V8	98	(New Zealand) Brendon Leitch	5–6
(New Zealand) Earl Bamber Motorsport	Aston Martin Vantage AMR GT3 Evo	Aston Martin M177 4.0 L Twin-Turbo V8	98	(Denmark) Marco Sørensen	5–6
(New Zealand) Earl Bamber Motorsport	Aston Martin Vantage AMR GT3 Evo	Aston Martin M177 4.0 L Twin-Turbo V8	98	(Indonesia) Anderson Tanoto	5–6
(Bahrain) 2 Seas Motorsport	Mercedes-AMG GT3 Evo	Mercedes-AMG M159 6.2 L V8	96	(United Kingdom) Ben Barnicoat	All
(Bahrain) 2 Seas Motorsport	Mercedes-AMG GT3 Evo	Mercedes-AMG M159 6.2 L V8	96	(United States) Anthony McIntosh	All
(Bahrain) 2 Seas Motorsport	Mercedes-AMG GT3 Evo	Mercedes-AMG M159 6.2 L V8	96	(Canada) Parker Thompson	All

- Triple Eight Race Engineering was scheduled to run a pair of Mercedes-AMG GT3 Evos, but withdrew prior to the start of the season.

== Results ==
Bold indicates overall winner.

Round	Circuit	LMP2 Winning Team	LMP3 Winning Team	GT Winning Team	Ref.
Round	Circuit	LMP2 Winning Drivers	LMP3 Winning Drivers	GT Winning Drivers	Ref.
1	(Malaysia) Sepang	**(France) No. 30 RD Limited**	(France) No. 35 Ultimate	(Japan) No. 57 Car Guy Racing	Report
1	(Malaysia) Sepang	**(Australia) James Allen** **(United States) Fred Poordad** **(France) Tristan Vautier**	(Belgium) Stéphane Lémeret (Italy) Matteo Quintarelli (Hungary) Bence Válint	(France) Esteban Masson (Brazil) Daniel Serra (Japan) Yudai Uchida	Report
2	(Malaysia) Sepang	**(Portugal) No. 25 Algarve Pro Racing**	(France) No. 35 Ultimate	(Germany) No. 81 Winward Racing	Report
2	(Malaysia) Sepang	**(Denmark) Malthe Jakobsen** **(Denmark) Michael Jensen** **(Italy) Valerio Rinicella**	(Belgium) Stéphane Lémeret (Italy) Matteo Quintarelli (Hungary) Bence Válint	(Andorra) Jules Gounon (Italy) Gabriele Piana; Rinat Salikhov	Report
3	(United Arab Emirates) Dubai	**(Portugal) No. 25 Algarve Pro Racing**	(Czech Republic) No. 26 Bretton Racing	(Bahrain) No. 96 2 Seas Motorsport	Report
3	(United Arab Emirates) Dubai	**(Denmark) Malthe Jakobsen** **(Denmark) Michael Jensen** **(Italy) Valerio Rinicella**	(Denmark) Theodor Jensen (Denmark) Jens Reno Møller (Australia) Griffin Peebles	(United Kingdom) Ben Barnicoat (United States) Anthony McIntosh (Canada) Parker Thompson	Report
4	(United Arab Emirates) Dubai	**(Portugal) No. 20 Algarve Pro Racing**	(United Kingdom) No. 15 RLR MSport	(Germany) No. 99 Herberth Motorsport (Note: The GT class winner for the second Dubai race was the No. 99 Herberth Motorsport entry. As it was not a full-season entrant, the points for the win were awarded to the No. 81 Winward Racing entry.)	Report
4	(United Arab Emirates) Dubai	**(United Kingdom) Olli Caldwell** **(Greece) Kriton Lendoudis** **(United Kingdom) Alex Quinn**	(United Kingdom) Nick Adcock (Mexico) Ian Aguilera (United Kingdom) Chris Short	(Germany) Ralf Bohn (Germany) Alfred Renauer (Germany) Robert Renauer	Report
5	(United Arab Emirates) Abu Dhabi	**(Portugal) No. 25 Algarve Pro Racing**	(United Kingdom) No. 15 RLR MSport	(Germany) No. 92 Manthey EMA	Report
5	(United Arab Emirates) Abu Dhabi	**(Denmark) Malthe Jakobsen** **(Denmark) Michael Jensen** **(Italy) Valerio Rinicella**	(United Kingdom) Nick Adcock (Mexico) Ian Aguilera (United Kingdom) Chris Short	(United States) Ryan Hardwick (Austria) Richard Lietz (Italy) Riccardo Pera	Report
6	(United Arab Emirates) Abu Dhabi	**(Italy) No. 83 AF Corse**	(Denmark) No. 49 High Class Racing	(Germany) No. 10 Manthey Racing	Report
6	(United Arab Emirates) Abu Dhabi	**(France) François Perrodo** **(Italy) Alessio Rovera** **(France) Matthieu Vaxivière**	(Denmark) Anders Fjordbach (Germany) Thomas Kiefer (United States) Mark Patterson	(Hong Kong) Antares Au (Austria) Klaus Bachler (Germany) Joel Sturm	Report

== Teams' Championships ==
Points are awarded according to the following structure:

Position	**1st**	**2nd**	**3rd**	**4th**	**5th**	**6th**	**7th**	**8th**	**9th**	**10th**	**Pole**
Points	25	18	15	12	10	8	6	4	2	1	1

=== LMP2 Teams Championship ===
Pos.	Team	Car	SEP (Malaysia)		DUB (United Arab Emirates)		ABU (United Arab Emirates)		Points
1	(Portugal) #25 Algarve Pro Racing	Oreca 07	4	1	1	5	1	4	109
2	(France) #30 RD Limited	Oreca 07	1	2	6	2	8	3	88
3	(Italy) #83 AF Corse	Oreca 07	2	6	4	3	6	1	86
4	(Portugal) #20 Algarve Pro Racing	Oreca 07	6	3	3	1	2	9	83
5	(Germany) #22 Proton Competition	Oreca 07	**DSQ**	**4**	**5**	**4**	**3**	**6**	63
6	(United Kingdom) #24 Nielsen Racing	Oreca 07	5	5	7	7	4	2	62
7	(Lithuania) #91 Pure Rxcing	Oreca 07	3	8	8	8	7	8	37
8	(Luxembourg) #3 DKR Engineering	Oreca 07	7	9	2	9	Ret	Ret	28
9	(Italy) #50 AF Corse	Oreca 07	8	7	10	6	9	7	27
10	(Germany) #11 Proton Competition	Oreca 07	9	10	9	Ret	5	5	26

Key
Colour	Result
Gold	Race winner
Silver	2nd place
Bronze	3rd place
Green	Points finish
Blue	Non-points finish
Blue	Non-classified finish (NC)
Purple	Did not finish (Ret)
Black	Disqualified (DSQ)
Black	Excluded (EX)
White	Did not start (DNS)
White	Race cancelled (C)
White	Withdrew (WD)
Blank	Did not participate

**Bold** – Pole
Italic – Fastest Lap

=== LMP3 Teams Championship ===
Pos.	Team	Car	SEP (Malaysia)		DUB (United Arab Emirates)		ABU (United Arab Emirates)		Points
1	(Czech Republic) #26 Bretton Racing	Ligier JS P320	4	4	1	2	2	3	100
2	(United Kingdom) #15 RLR MSport	Ligier JS P320	5	3	Ret	1	1	2	93
3	(France) #35 Ultimate	Ligier JS P320	**1**	**1**	2	Ret	5	4	92
4	(Denmark) #49 High Class Racing	Ligier JS P320	2	2	**4**	**3**	**Ret**	**1**	92
5	(Poland) #34 Inter Europol Competition	Ligier JS P320	Ret	5	3	5	4	6	55
6	(Switzerland) #7 Graff Racing	Ligier JS P320	3	Ret	6	4	3	Ret	50
7	(Poland) #43 Inter Europol Competition	Ligier JS P320	Ret	6	5	6	Ret	5	36

=== GT Teams Championship ===
Pos.	Team	Car	SEP (Malaysia)		DUB (United Arab Emirates)		ABU (United Arab Emirates)		Points
1	(Germany) #10 Manthey Racing	Porsche 911 GT3 R (992)	Ret	2	5	4	2	1	86
2	(Germany) #92 Manthey EMA	Porsche 911 GT3 R (992)	3	13	2	5	1	7	76
3	(Germany) #81 Winward Racing	Mercedes-AMG GT3 Evo	5	1	Ret	2	**Ret**	10	65
4	(Switzerland) #74 Kessel Racing	Ferrari 296 GT3	6	12	**3**	**10**	4	3	54
5	(New Zealand) #89 Earl Bamber Motorsport	Aston Martin Vantage AMR GT3 Evo	11	18	20	3	5	2	46
6	(Bahrain) #96 2 Seas Motorsport	Mercedes-AMG GT3 Evo	8	8	1	6	Ret	Ret	43
7	(Japan) #57 Car Guy Racing	Ferrari 296 GT3	1	Ret	11	11	Ret	6	34
8	(Germany) #16 Winward Racing	Mercedes-AMG GT3 Evo	Ret	11	6	18	3	5	33
9	(Italy) #28 AF Corse	Ferrari 296 GT3	4	**3**	16	19	9	14	32
10	(China) #87 Origine Motorsport	Porsche 911 GT3 R (992)	Ret	5	4	8	12	24	29
11	(Italy) #51 AF Corse	Ferrari 296 GT3	2	9	7	12	19	19	26
12	(China) #2 Climax Racing	Mercedes-AMG GT3 Evo	10	4	9	7	14	**12**	26
13	(Italy) #85 Iron Dames	Porsche 911 GT3 R (992)	13	6	15	23	7	13	15
14	(United Kingdom) #27 Optimum Motorsport	McLaren 720S GT3 Evo	14	23	13	Ret	Ret	4	12
15	(Germany) #60 Proton Competition	Porsche 911 GT3 R (992)	7	17	8	15	20	22	10
16	(Italy) #82 AF Corse	Ferrari 296 GT3	20	10	WD	WD	6	Ret	9
17	(Germany) #9 GetSpeed Performance	Mercedes-AMG GT3 Evo	**15**	7	24	16	Ret	17	7
18	(Germany) #12 Car Collection Motorsport	Porsche 911 GT3 R (992)	9	15	12	9	15	16	6
19	(New Zealand) #42 Prime Speed Sport	Lamborghini Huracán GT3 Evo 2	19	Ret	21	Ret	11	Ret	2
20	(China) #14 Climax Racing	Mercedes-AMG GT3 Evo	18	16	10	13	WD	WD	1
21	(United Kingdom) #77 Optimum Motorsport	McLaren 720S GT3 Evo	12	14	NC	Ret	Ret	Ret	0
22	(United Kingdom) #19 Blackthorn	Aston Martin Vantage AMR GT3 Evo	16	20	14	14	21	15	0
23	(Germany) #21 Car Collection Motorsport	Porsche 911 GT3 R (992)	17	22	WD	WD	16	20	0
24	(Hong Kong) #23 Absolute Racing	Ferrari 296 GT3	Ret	21	18	21	18	21	0
25	(San Marino) #79 Tsunami RT	Porsche 911 GT3 R (992)	21	19	22	20	Ret	18	0
Teams ineligible to score points
	(Germany) #99 Herberth Motorsport	Porsche 911 GT3 R (992)			23	1	8	9	
	(New Zealand) #98 Earl Bamber Motorsport	Aston Martin Vantage AMR GT3 Evo					13	8	
	(United Arab Emirates) #88 Dragon Racing	Ferrari 296 GT3			19	17	10	11	
	(Qatar) #46 QMMF by Herberth	Porsche 911 GT3 R (992)			17	22	Ret	WD	
	(United Arab Emirates) #8 Dragon Racing	Ferrari 296 GT3			Ret	WD	17	23	

== Drivers' Championships ==
Points are awarded according to the following structure:

Position	1st	2nd	3rd	4th	5th	6th	7th	8th	9th	10th	Pole
Points	25	18	15	12	10	8	6	4	2	1	1

=== LMP2 Drivers Championship ===
Pos.	Drivers	Team	SEP (Malaysia)		DUB (United Arab Emirates)		ABU (United Arab Emirates)		Points
1	(Denmark) Malthe Jakobsen	(Portugal) Algarve Pro Racing	4	1	1	5	1	4	109
1	(Denmark) Michael Jensen	(Portugal) Algarve Pro Racing	4	1	1	5	1	4	109
1	(Italy) Valerio Rinicella	(Portugal) Algarve Pro Racing	4	1	1	5	1	4	109
2	(Australia) James Allen	(France) RD Limited	1	2	6	2	8	3	88
2	(United States) Fred Poordad	(France) RD Limited	1	2	6	2	8	3	88
2	(France) Tristan Vautier	(France) RD Limited	1	2	6	2	8	3	88
3	(France) François Perrodo	(Italy) AF Corse	2	6	4	3	6	1	86
3	(Italy) Alessio Rovera	(Italy) AF Corse	2	6	4	3	6	1	86
3	(France) Matthieu Vaxivière	(Italy) AF Corse	2	6	4	3	6	1	86
4	(United Kingdom) Olli Caldwell	(Portugal) Algarve Pro Racing	6	3	3	1	2	9	83
4	(Greece) Kriton Lendoudis	(Portugal) Algarve Pro Racing	6	3	3	1	2	9	83
4	(United Kingdom) Alex Quinn	(Portugal) Algarve Pro Racing	6	3	3	1	2	9	83
5	(France) Tom Dillmann	(Germany) Proton Competition	DSQ	4	5	4	3	6	63
5	Vladislav Lomko	(Germany) Proton Competition	DSQ	4	5	4	3	6	63
5	(Italy) Giorgio Roda	(Germany) Proton Competition	DSQ	4	5	4	3	6	63
6	(United Kingdom) Matt Bell	(United Kingdom) Nielsen Racing	5	5	7	7	4	2	62
6	(Netherlands) Nicky Catsburg	(United Kingdom) Nielsen Racing	5	5	7	7	4	2	62
6	(United States) Naveen Rao	(United Kingdom) Nielsen Racing	5	5	7	7	4	2	62
7	(United Kingdom) Harry King	(Lithuania) Pure Rxcing	3	8	8	8	7	8	37
7	(Saint Kitts and Nevis) Alex Malykhin	(Lithuania) Pure Rxcing	3	8	8	8	7	8	37
8	(Germany) Laurents Hörr	(Luxembourg) DKR Engineering	7	9	2	9	Ret	Ret	28
8	(Greece) Georgios Kolovos	(Luxembourg) DKR Engineering	7	9	2	9	Ret	Ret	28
8	(Netherlands) Job van Uitert	(Luxembourg) DKR Engineering	7	9	2	9	Ret	Ret	28
9	(United States) Patrick Byrne	(Italy) AF Corse	8	7	10	6	9	7	27
9	(United States) Jeremy Clarke	(Italy) AF Corse	8	7	10	6	9	7	27
9	(France) Olivier Pla	(Italy) AF Corse	8	7	10	6	9	7	27
10	(Germany) Alexander Mattschull	(Germany) Proton Competition	9	10	9	10	5	5	26
10	(Germany) Jonas Ried	(Germany) Proton Competition	9	10	9	10	5	5	26
11	(Switzerland) Mathias Beche	(Germany) Proton Competition	9 (Note: Mathias Beche did not fulfil his mandated minimum drive time during race 1 of the 4 Hours of Sepang, meaning that he did not receive points for that event.)	WD	9	10	5	5	23
12	(Switzerland) Louis Delétraz	(Lithuania) Pure Rxcing	3	8					19
13	(France) Julien Andlauer	(Lithuania) Pure Rxcing			8	8	7	8	18

=== LMP3 Drivers Championship ===
Pos.	Drivers	Team	SEP (Malaysia)		DUB (United Arab Emirates)		ABU (United Arab Emirates)		Points
1	(Denmark) Theodor Jensen	(Czech Republic) Bretton Racing	4	4	1	2	2	3	100
1	(Denmark) Jens Reno Møller	(Czech Republic) Bretton Racing	4	4	1	2	2	3	100
2	(United Kingdom) Nick Adcock	(United Kingdom) RLR MSport	5	3	Ret	1	1	2	93
2	(Mexico) Ian Aguilera	(United Kingdom) RLR MSport	5	3	Ret	1	1	2	93
3	(Italy) Matteo Quintarelli	(France) Ultimate	1	1	2	Ret	5	4	92
4	(Denmark) Anders Fjordbach	(Denmark) High Class Racing	2	2	4	3	Ret	1	92
4	(United States) Mark Patterson	(Denmark) High Class Racing	2	2	4	3	Ret	1	92
5	(Australia) Griffin Peebles	(Czech Republic) Bretton Racing			1	2	2	3	76
6	(United Kingdom) Chris Short	(United Kingdom) RLR MSport			Ret	1	1	2	68
7	(Germany) Thomas Kiefer	(Denmark) High Class Racing			4	3	Ret	1	56
8	(Canada) Daniel Ali	(Poland) Inter Europol Competition	Ret	5	3	5	4	6	55
8	(United Kingdom) Tim Creswick	(Poland) Inter Europol Competition	Ret	5	3	5	4	6	55
8	(Belgium) Douwe Dedecker	(Poland) Inter Europol Competition	Ret	5	3	5	4	6	55
9	(Belgium) Stéphane Lémeret	(France) Ultimate	1	1					52
9	(Hungary) Bence Válint	(France) Ultimate	1	1					52
10	(Saint Kitts and Nevis) Alexander Bukhantsov	(Switzerland) Graff Racing	3	Ret	6	4	3	Ret	50
10	(Singapore) Danial Frost	(Switzerland) Graff Racing	3	Ret	6	4	3	Ret	50
10	(United Kingdom) James Winslow	(Switzerland) Graff Racing	3	Ret	6	4	3	Ret	50
11	(Italy) Leonardo Colavita	(France) Ultimate			2	Ret	5	4	40
11	(France) Louis Stern	(France) Ultimate			2	Ret	5	4	40
12	(New Zealand) Steve Brooks	(Poland) Inter Europol Competition	Ret	6	5	6	Ret	5	36
12	(Denmark) Mikkel Kristensen	(Poland) Inter Europol Competition	Ret	6	5	6	Ret	5	36
12	(Switzerland) Kévin Rabin	(Poland) Inter Europol Competition	Ret	6	5	6	Ret	5	36
13	(Canada) James Dayson	(United Kingdom) RLR MSport	5	3					25
14	(Czech Republic) Dan Skočdople	(Czech Republic) Bretton Racing	4	4					24

=== GT Drivers Championship ===
Pos.	Drivers	Team	SEP (Malaysia)		DUB (United Arab Emirates)		ABU (United Arab Emirates)		Points
1	(Hong Kong) Antares Au	(Germany) Manthey Racing	Ret	2	5	4	2	1	86
1	(Austria) Klaus Bachler	(Germany) Manthey Racing	Ret	2	5	4	2	1	86
1	(Germany) Joel Sturm	(Germany) Manthey Racing	Ret	2	5	4	2	1	86
2	(United States) Ryan Hardwick	(Germany) Manthey EMA	3	13	2	5	1	7	76
2	(Austria) Richard Lietz	(Germany) Manthey EMA	3	13	2	5	1	7	76
2	(Italy) Riccardo Pera	(Germany) Manthey EMA	3	13	2	5	1	7	76
3	(Italy) Gabriele Piana	(Germany) Winward Racing	5	1	Ret	2	Ret	10	65
3	Rinat Salikhov	(Germany) Winward Racing	5	1	Ret	2	Ret	10	65
4	(United States) Dustin Blattner	(Switzerland) Kessel Racing	6	12	3	10	4	3	54
4	(Germany) Dennis Marschall	(Switzerland) Kessel Racing	6	12	3	10	4	3	54
4	(United Kingdom) Ben Tuck	(Switzerland) Kessel Racing	6	12	3	10	4	3	54
5	(United Kingdom) Jamie Day	(New Zealand) Earl Bamber Motorsport			20	3	5	2	46
5	(Italy) Mattia Drudi	(New Zealand) Earl Bamber Motorsport			20	3	5	2	46
5	(Luxembourg) Gabriel Rindone	(New Zealand) Earl Bamber Motorsport			20	3	5	2	46
6	(United Kingdom) Ben Barnicoat	(Bahrain) 2 Seas Motorsport	8	8	1	6	Ret	Ret	43
6	(United States) Anthony McIntosh	(Bahrain) 2 Seas Motorsport	8	8	1	6	Ret	Ret	43
6	(Canada) Parker Thompson	(Bahrain) 2 Seas Motorsport	8	8	1	6	Ret	Ret	43
7	(Andorra) Jules Gounon	(Germany) Winward Racing	5	1					35
8	(Brazil) Daniel Serra	(Japan) Car Guy Racing	1	Ret	11	11	Ret	6	34
9	(Germany) Maro Engel	(Germany) Winward Racing	Ret	11	6	18	3	5	33
9	Viktor Shaytar	(Germany) Winward Racing	Ret	11	6	18	3	5	33
9	Sergey Stolyarov	(Germany) Winward Racing	Ret	11	6	18	3	5	33
10	(United States) Manny Franco	(Italy) AF Corse	4	3	16	19	9	14	32
10	(Italy) Davide Rigon	(Italy) AF Corse	4	3	16	19	9	14	32
10	(Italy) Massimiliano Wiser	(Italy) AF Corse	4	3	16	19	9	14	32
11	(Germany) Luca Stolz	(Germany) Winward Racing			Ret	2	Ret	10	30
12	(China) Yuan Bo	(China) Origine Motorsport	Ret	5	4	8	12	24	29
12	(Germany) Laurin Heinrich	(China) Origine Motorsport	Ret	5	4	8	12	24	29
12	(China) Leo Ye Hongli	(China) Origine Motorsport	Ret	5	4	8	12	24	29
13	(Italy) Riccardo Agostini	(Italy) AF Corse	2	9	7	12	19	19	26
13	(Monaco) Cédric Sbirrazzuoli	(Italy) AF Corse	2	9	7	12	19	19	26
13	(Brazil) Custodio Toledo	(Italy) AF Corse	2	9	7	12	19	19	26
14	(Estonia) Ralf Aron	(China) Climax Racing	10	4	9	7	14	12	26
14	(Finland) Elias Seppänen	(China) Climax Racing	10	4	9	7	14	12	26
14	(China) Zhou Bihuang	(China) Climax Racing	10	4	9	7	14	12	26
15	(France) Esteban Masson	(Japan) Car Guy Racing	1	Ret					25
15	(Japan) Yudai Uchida	(Japan) Car Guy Racing	1	Ret					25
16	(Belgium) Sarah Bovy	(Italy) Iron Dames	13	6	15	23	7	13	15
16	(Denmark) Michelle Gatting	(Italy) Iron Dames	13	6	15	23	7	13	15
16	(France) Célia Martin	(Italy) Iron Dames	13	6	15	23	7	13	15
17	(United Kingdom) Andrew Gilbert	(United Kingdom) Optimum Motorsport	14	23	13	Ret	Ret	4	12
17	(Germany) Benjamin Goethe	(United Kingdom) Optimum Motorsport	14	23	13	Ret	Ret	4	12
17	(Spain) Fran Rueda	(United Kingdom) Optimum Motorsport	14	23	13	Ret	Ret	4	12
18	(Italy) Matteo Cressoni	(Germany) Proton Competition	7	17	8	15	20	22	10
18	(Belgium) Alessio Picariello	(Germany) Proton Competition	7	17	8	15	20	22	10
18	(Italy) Claudio Schiavoni	(Germany) Proton Competition	7	17	8	15	20	22	10
19	(Denmark) Conrad Laursen	(Italy) AF Corse	20	10	WD	WD	6	Ret	9
19	(France) Charles-Henri Samani	(Italy) AF Corse	20	10	WD	WD	6	Ret	9
19	(Argentina) Nicolás Varrone	(Italy) AF Corse	20	10	WD	WD	6	Ret	9
20	(Japan) Takeshi Kimura	(Japan) Car Guy Racing			11	11	Ret	6	9
20	(United Kingdom) Casper Stevenson	(Japan) Car Guy Racing			11	11	Ret	6	9
21	(United States) Anthony Bartone	(Germany) GetSpeed Performance	15	7	24	16	Ret	17	7
21	(Luxembourg) Steve Jans	(Germany) GetSpeed Performance	15	7	24	16	Ret	17	7
21	(Germany) Fabian Schiller	(Germany) GetSpeed Performance	15	7	24	16	Ret	17	7
22	(United Kingdom) James Kell	(Germany) Car Collection Motorsport	9	15	12	9	15	16	6
22	(Canada) Bashar Mardini	(Germany) Car Collection Motorsport	9	15	12	9	15	16	6
22	(Germany) Nico Menzel	(Germany) Car Collection Motorsport	9	15	12	9	15	16	6
23	(Australia) Nick Foster	(New Zealand) Prime Speed Sport	19	Ret	21	Ret	11	Ret	2
23	(New Zealand) Jono Lester	(New Zealand) Prime Speed Sport	19	Ret	21	Ret	11	Ret	2
23	(New Zealand) René Heremana Malmezac	(New Zealand) Prime Speed Sport	19	Ret	21	Ret	11	Ret	2
24	(Austria) Lucas Auer	(China) Climax Racing	18	16	10	13	WD	WD	1
24	(China) Ling Kang	(China) Climax Racing	18	16	10	13	WD	WD	1
24	(China) Lu Wei	(China) Climax Racing	18	16	10	13	WD	WD	1
25	(New Zealand) Brendon Leitch	(New Zealand) Earl Bamber Motorsport	11	18					0
25	(Denmark) Marco Sørensen	(New Zealand) Earl Bamber Motorsport	11	18					0
25	(Indonesia) Anderson Tanoto	(New Zealand) Earl Bamber Motorsport	11	18					0
26	(United Kingdom) Tom Ikin	(United Kingdom) Optimum Motorsport	12	14	NC	Ret	Ret	Ret	0
26	(United Kingdom) Morgan Tillbrook	(United Kingdom) Optimum Motorsport	12	14	NC	Ret	Ret	Ret	0
27	(United Kingdom) Tom Gamble	(United Kingdom) Optimum Motorsport	12	14					0
28	(United Kingdom) Jonathan Adam	(United Kingdom) Blackthorn			14	14	21	15	0
28	(United Kingdom) Charles Bateman	(United Kingdom) Blackthorn			14	14	21	15	0
29	(Saudi Arabia) Reema Juffali	(United Kingdom) Blackthorn			14	14			0
30	(Italy) Giacomo Petrobelli	(United Kingdom) Blackthorn					21	15	0
31	(Switzerland) Alex Fontana	(Germany) Car Collection Motorsport	17	22	WD	WD	16	20	0
31	(Switzerland) 'Hash'	(Germany) Car Collection Motorsport	17	22	WD	WD	16	20	0
31	(Switzerland) Yannick Mettler	(Germany) Car Collection Motorsport	17	22	WD	WD	16	20	0
32	(United Kingdom) Jason Ambrose	(United Kingdom) Blackthorn	16	20					0
32	(Switzerland) Claude Bovet	(United Kingdom) Blackthorn	16	20					0
32	(United Kingdom) David McDonald	(United Kingdom) Blackthorn	16	20					0
33	(Thailand) Carl Bennett	(Hong Kong) Absolute Racing	Ret	21	18	21	18	21	0
33	(United States) Gregory Bennett	(Hong Kong) Absolute Racing	Ret	21	18	21	18	21	0
33	(New Zealand) Chris van der Drift	(Hong Kong) Absolute Racing	Ret	21	18	21	18	21	0
34	(Italy) Fabio Babini	(San Marino) Tsunami RT	21	19	22	20	Ret	18	0
34	(New Zealand) Daniel Gaunt	(San Marino) Tsunami RT	21	19	22	20	Ret	18	0
34	(Italy) Johannes Zelger	(San Marino) Tsunami RT	21	19	22	20	Ret	18	0
35	(Germany) Marvin Kirchhöfer	(United Kingdom) Optimum Motorsport			NC	Ret	Ret	Ret	0
