= Mathias Beche =

Swiss professional racing driver (born 1986)

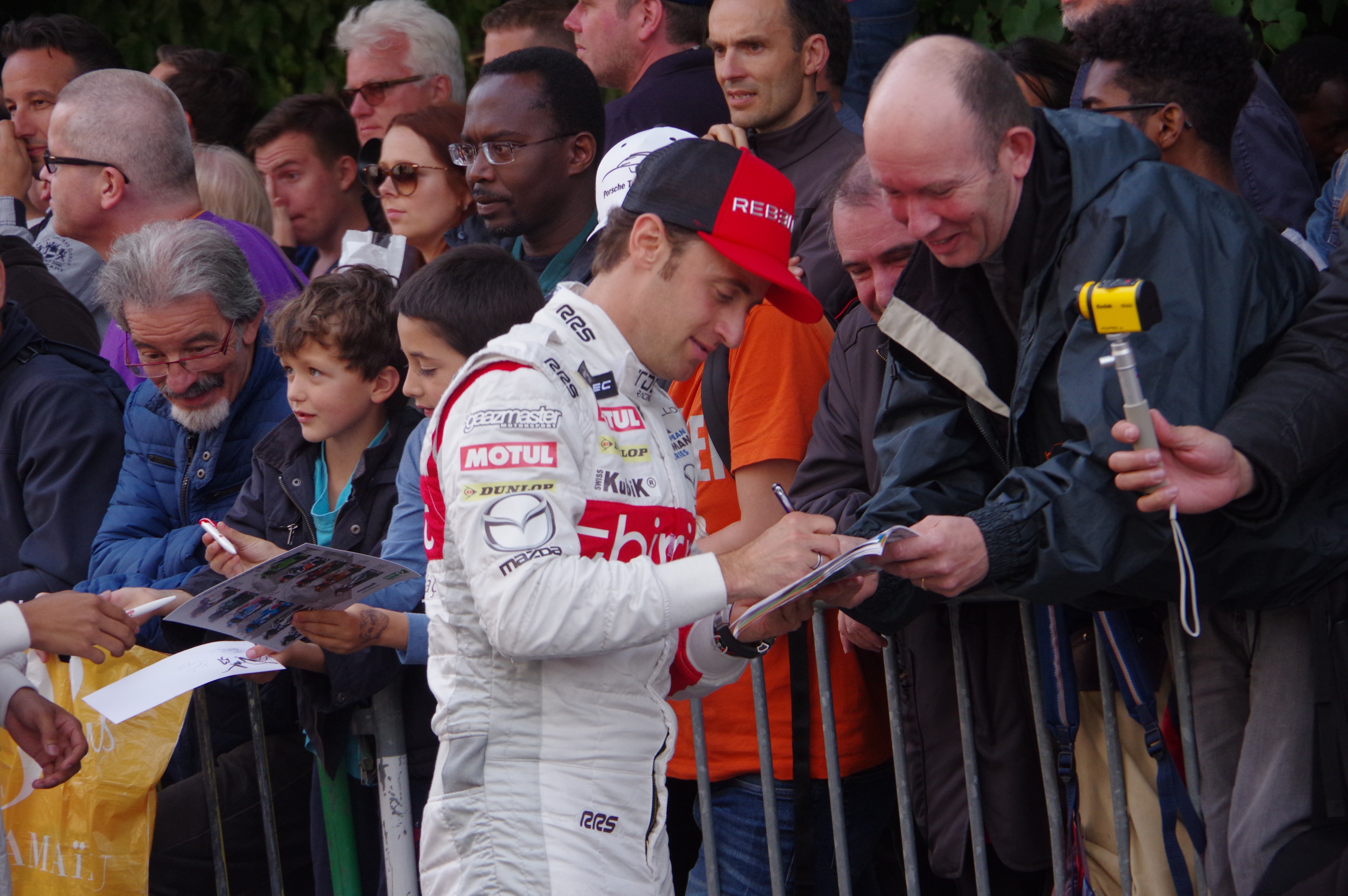
- Beche at the 2016 24 Hours of Le Mans drivers parade
- Nationality: (Switzerland) Swiss (France) French via dual nationality
- Born: Mathias Beche Aussel; 28 June 1986 (age 40) Geneva, Switzerland

European Le Mans Series career
- Debut season: 2010
- Current team: TDS Racing
- Categorisation: FIA Gold (until 2012, 2019–); FIA Platinum (2013–2018)
- Car number: 29
- Former teams: Hope Polevision Racing; Applewood Seven; Matech Competition; Inter Europol Competition; TDS Racing x Vaillante; Nielsen Racing
- Starts: 48
- Wins: 12
- Poles: 10
- Fastest laps: 2
- Best finish: 1st in 2012

Previous series
- 2011 2010 2009 2008 2008 2007–2008: FIA GT1 World Championship; European GT3; Formula Le Mans; Formula Asia 2.0; Formula V6 Asia; Asian Formula Renault

Championship titles
- 2014 2012: FIA WEC (LMP1-L); European Le Mans Series (LMP2)

Awards
- 2025: Goodyear Golden Wingfoot Award

Mathias Beche Aussel (born 28 June 1986 in Geneva) is a Swiss and French professional racing driver who competes in the IMSA SportsCar Championship for TDS Racing.

Beche is one of the most accomplished drivers in LMP2 history, with 15 wins across WEC, ELMS and AsLMS. He made his LMP2 debut in 2011, and won the European Le Mans Series for TDS Racing in 2012. Beche then drove for Rebellion Racing in LMP1, twice winning the privateer title. In 2018, he finished third overall at the 24 Hours of Le Mans behind the factory Toyotas, and scored Rebellion's first FIA World Endurance Championship victory at Silverstone.

Beche returned to LMP2 in 2022, and set pole at Le Mans in 2025.

== Career ==
After starting in karting, Beche began racing in single-seaters in Asia in 2007 when he contested the Asian Formula Renault Challenge, finishing fifth overall with one win. The following year, he took part in Formula Asia 2.0 where he ended up runner-up to Felix Rosenqvist.

2009 saw Beche switch to sportscar racing, finishing third in Formula Le Mans. In 2010, he contested four Le Mans Series rounds; three in the FLM class and one in GT1 in a Ford GT. He then entered the last two rounds of the FIA GT3 European Championship, also in a Ford.

In 2011, Beche competed in the full Le Mans Series season in an LMP2 Oreca 03 for TDS Racing with Pierre Thiriet and Jody Firth. The trio won the rounds at Spa and Estoril and finished fourth in the final drivers' standings. Beche also drove in the FIA GT1 World Championship round at Zolder in a Ford.

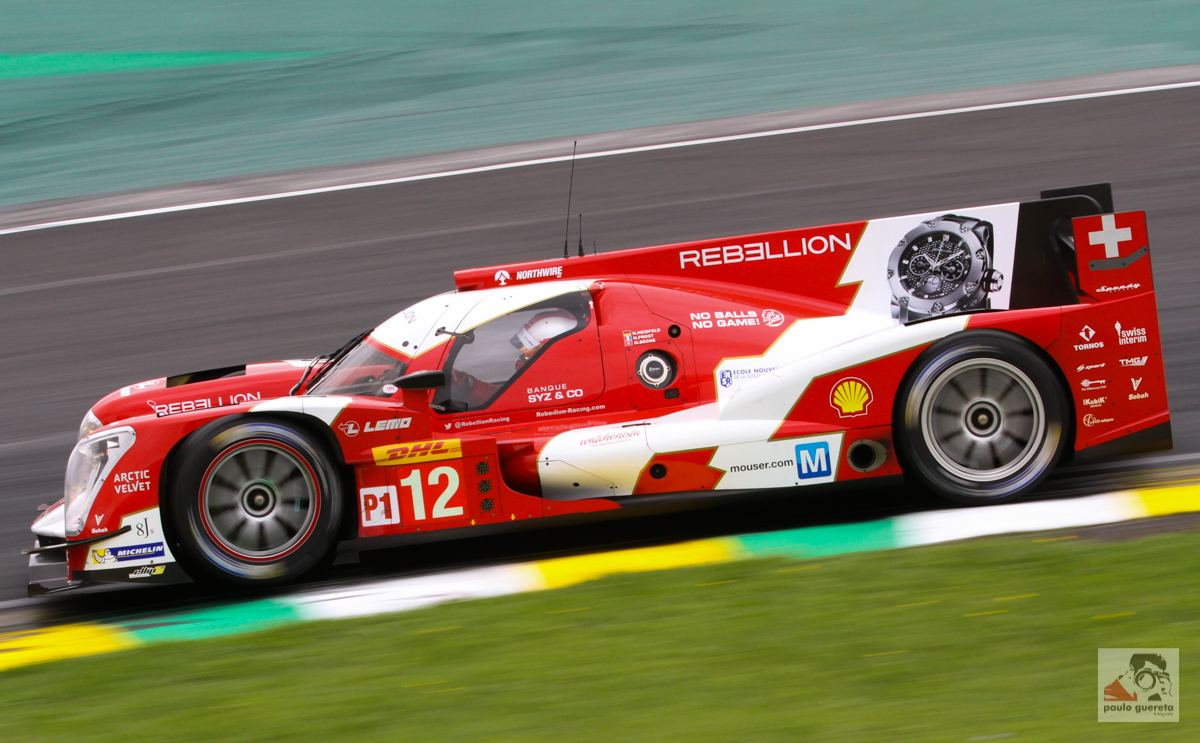
Beche driving Rebellion Racing's LMP1 car at Interlagos in 2014.

For 2012, LMP2 became the top class of the renamed European Le Mans Series. Partnering Thiriet at TDS, Beche won the opening round of the season at Paul Ricard and the season finale at Road Atlanta, securing his first major championship victory. For that year's 24 Hours of Le Mans they were joined by Christophe Tinseau, finishing second in class.

Beche remained in the ELMS with Thiriet by TDS in 2013, though he would also progress to drive in the FIA WEC's top class, piloting a Lola B12/60 for Rebellion Racing. Despite missing the opening ELMS round, the Swiss driver took two victories alongside Thiriet, leading the team towards second place in the standings. In the WEC, Beche scored two podium finishes on his way to fifth in the championship.

Rebellion's LMP1 programme became the permanent home for Beche during the next two seasons, which started with an LMP1-L class win (for non-hybrid powered teams) at the 24 Hours of Le Mans alongside Nico Prost and Nick Heidfeld and the eventual LMP1-L title in 2014. The team withdrew from the opening two races of the 2015 season to finalise work on their new Rebellion R-One, but once they entered, Beche and Prost took two privateer class wins to become champions. At the end of the year, Beche was part of a shootout for a reserve seat at Toyota Gazoo Racing, with Jean-Éric Vergne and Kamui Kobayashi.

In 2016, Beche returned to the ELMS with Thiriet by TDS, driving an Oreca 05 alongside Pierre Thiriet and Ryō Hirakawa. He took pole for the opening race at Silverstone by a record 1.105 seconds, though an early crash by Thiriet forced the team out of the race. The trio bounced back by winning a weather-affected event at Imola, before Thiriet/TDS won again at the Red Bull Ring. Beche then took a convincing pole at Le Castellet, paving the way for the outfit's third successive victory, leading from lights to flag and putting a lap on the field. Another podium finish at Spa was not enough to win the title, as Beche and the team suffered electrical troubles in the final race at Estoril, which was won by eventual champions G-Drive Racing.

Beche returned to Rebellion on a full-time basis in 2017, competing in the LMP2 class of the WEC. His No. 13 entry was hampered by disqualifications at Le Mans, where a miraculous overall podium (and second place in class) was taken away by the team's "unnecessary modification of approved bodywork", and Fuji, which saw a heated battle between Beche and Jean-Éric Vergne come to a head before Rebellion were excluded for a drive time violation. Despite taking three podiums from the final four races, the Swiss driver and his teammates finished fourth in the teams' standings, whereas the sister #31 entry won the LMP2 title.

Beche finished third overall for Rebellion at the 2018 24 Hours of Le Mans.

For the 2018–19 WEC "Super Season", Beche and Rebellion returned to LMP1 with the R13, with the Swiss driver partnering Thomas Laurent and Gustavo Menezes. The team started off with two third places, including an outright podium at Le Mans, before a disqualification for both Toyotas earned Beche and his teammates victory at Silverstone. However, Beche moved to the sister car for the round at Sebring and left the team with two races to go, meaning that he finished sixth in the championship — three places behind Menezes and Laurent.

After a scattergun racing programme in 2019 and 2020, where he made his Super GT debut for arto Ping An Team Thailand, Beche returned to the rostrum in 2021, winning the final race of the Le Mans Cup in LMP3 for Phoenix Racing, as well as the WEC's 8 Hours of Portimão in LMP2 Pro-Am for Realteam Racing.

Beche would make the LMP2 Pro-Am category his home in 2022, driving for TDS Racing x Vaillante alongside rookie Tijmen van der Helm and amateur driver Philippe Cimadomo in the ELMS. He took two overall pole positions during the year, at Le Castellet and Monza, though this was only enough for fourth in the Pro-Am standings. The team also finished fourth at the Le Mans 24 Hours, where a pre-race exclusion for Cimadomo for insufficient driving standards forced the team up to compete as a Pro entrant with new driver Nyck de Vries. Beche switched to Nielsen Racing for the 2023 ELMS season, where he, Ben Hanley and Rodrigo Sales finished fourth in the Pro-Am classification with three class podiums. At Le Mans, the trio retired early when Sales crashed at Dunlop corner.

Going into 2024, Beche teamed up with LMP2 rookie Grégoire Saucy and the returning Sales at Richard Mille by TDS in the ELMS, driving in the LMP2 Pro-Am class once again. A slow stop limited Beche to second in Barcelona, before a strong performance in Le Castellet gave the TDS crew victory. Despite Beche's impressive pace at Le Mans, which he contested for TDS's sister team Panis Racing, numerous penalties for the team left him fourth in LMP2 Pro-Am. Back in the ELMS, third in Imola allowed the team to take the championship lead. At Spa-Francorchamps however, a mid-race crash by Saucy ended TDS's race early. Beche and his teammates recovered lost ground in Mugello, as they performed an aggressive recovery drive to win. This put TDS just two points behind leaders AF Corse ahead of the Portimão finale. In an immensely tight championship battle, an overtake by Matthieu Vaxivière on Beche in the dying embers of the race was a deciding factor, one that dropped TDS to fourth in the championship.

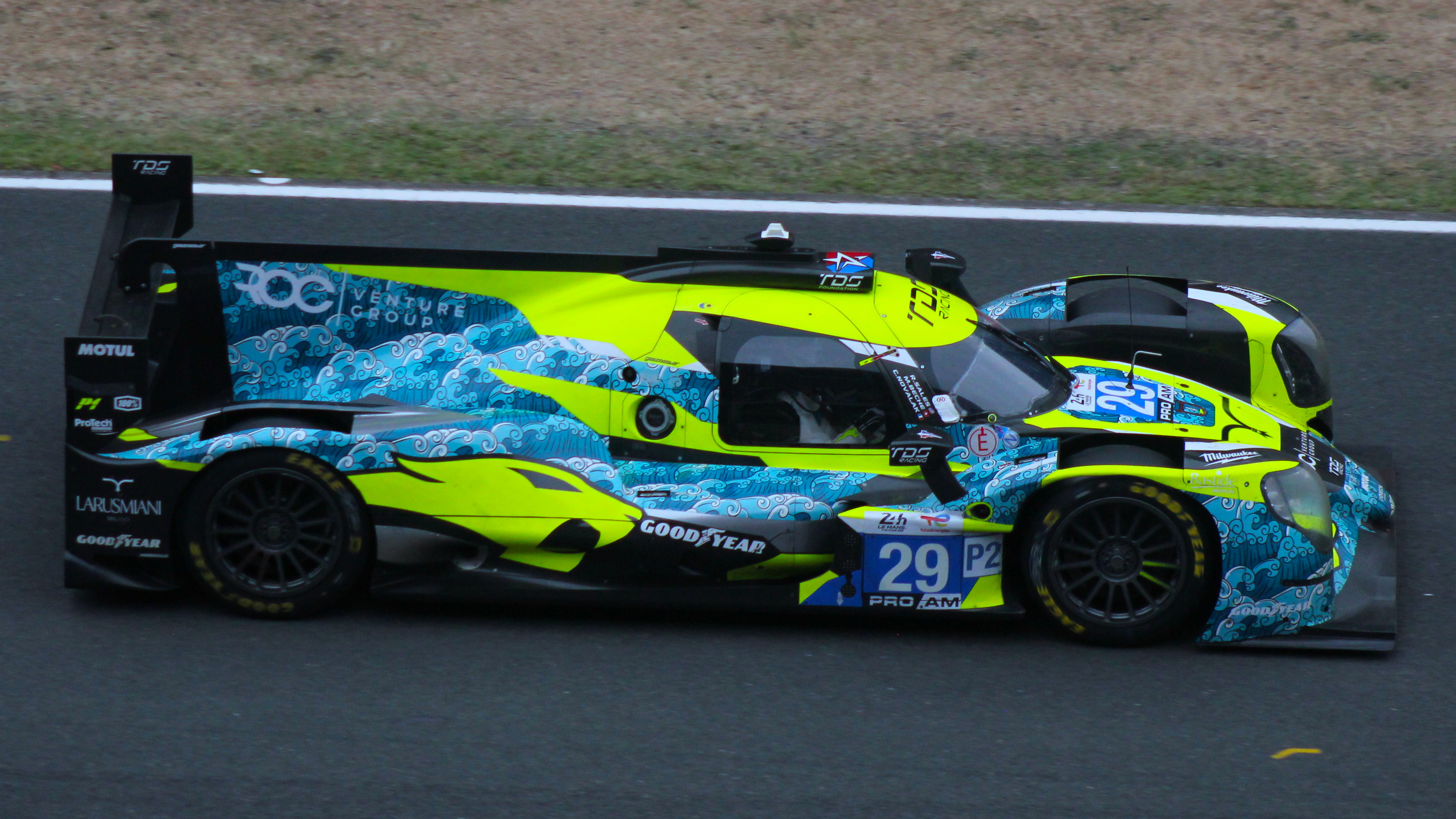
Beche took pole position for TDS Racing in LMP2 at the 2025 24 Hours of Le Mans.

During the 2024–25 winter, Beche took part in the Asian Le Mans Series, partnering Jonas Ried and Alexander Mattschull at Proton Competition. Due to health problems, Beche withdrew mid-weekend at Sepang. Thanks in part to mechanical problems in Dubai and a drive time penalty at Yas Marina, the Proton crew finished last in the teams' standings. Beche was initially announced to drive a full season in the 2025 IMSA SportsCar Championship for PR1/Mathiasen Motorsports. Despite partnering two bronze drivers in Ben Keating and Sales, Beche inherited third place in class at the 24 Hours of Daytona. Beche left the team before round four at Mosport and was replaced by Benjamin Pedersen.

Beche remained at TDS Racing for the 2025 ELMS season, partnering Sales and Clément Novalak. With a win at the season finale at Portimão, Beche and his teammates finished third in the LMP2 Pro-Am standings. As a recognition for his average stint pace across the season, Beche received the Goodyear Golden Wingfoot Award in his category. He also scored pole position, fastest lap and second place at the 24 Hours of Le Mans. In late 2025, Beche sampled the Peugeot 9X8 Hypercar at the WEC rookie test in Bahrain.

Beche returned to AsLMS for the 2025–26 winter, joining DKR Engineering alongside Mattschull and Griffin Peebles. At the Abu Dhabi season finale, an unwell Beche and his teammates took victory to place fourth in the standings. Beche later revealed he had been suffering from chronic effects of COVID since January, and withdrew from the 12 Hours of Sebring in order to fully recover. He returned to action at the 24 Hours of Le Mans in June, partnering Tobias Lütke and Porsche factory driver Kévin Estre at TDS. Beche was the second fastest LMP2 driver in the race, behind only Esteban Masson. Beche and Lütke completed the season together in IMSA, and scored a late podium at Road America.

== Driver profile ==
As early as 2016, Beche has been described as an "ace" in the LMP2 class.

Beche's coaching abilities have been noted by 2026 European Le Mans Series champion Griffin Peebles, who singled out Beche as having helped him adapt to the Oreca 07 during the 2025–26 Asian Le Mans Series season.

== Racing record ==
=== Complete Asian Formula Renault Challenge results ===
(key) (Races in bold indicate pole position) (Races in italics indicate fastest lap)

Year	Entrant	1	2	3	4	5	6	7	8	9	10	11	12	13	14	Rank	Points
2007	Asia Racing Team	ZHU1; 1; 6	ZHU1; 2; 6	SEP; 1; 4	SEP; 2; 5	BEI1; 1; 2	BEI1; 2; 2	SHA1; 1; 5	SHA1; 2 Ret	ZHU2; 1; 15	ZHU2; 2; 11	BEI2; 1; 4	BEI2; 2 Ret	SHA2; 1; 4	SHA2; 2; 1	5th	190

=== Complete Formula Asia 2.0 results ===
(key) (Races in bold indicate pole position) (Races in italics indicate fastest lap)

Year	Entrant	1	2	3	4	5	6	7	8	9	10	11	12	13	14	15	Rank	Points
2008	Champ Motorsport	SEP1; 1; 1	**SEP1**; **2**; 2	SEP1; 3; 2	SEP2; 1; 4	SEP2; 2; 5	**BIR1**; **1**; 3	BIR1; 2; 3	BIR2; 1; 5	BIR2; 2; 4							2nd	190
2008	Asia Racing Team										SHA1; 1; 1	SHA1; 2; 2	**SHA2**; **1** Ret	SHA2; 2; 3	SHA2; 3; 2	SHA2; 4; 2	2nd	190

=== Complete Formula Le Mans Cup results ===
(key) (Races in bold indicate pole position) (Races in italics indicate fastest lap)

Year	Entrant	1	2	3	4	5	6	7	8	9	10	Rank	Points
2009	Hope Polevision Racing	SPA; 1; 3	SPA; 2; 2	**LMS**; 2	PRT; 1; 4	PRT; 2; 2	NÜR; 1; 2	NÜR; 2; 8	SIL; 1; 2	**SIL**; **2**; 1	**MAG**; 1	3rd	146

=== Complete European Le Mans Series results ===
(key) (Races in bold indicate pole position) (Races in italics indicate fastest lap)

Year	Entrant	Class	Chassis	Engine	1	2	3	4	5	6	Rank	Points
2010	Hope Polevision Racing	FLM	Oreca FLM09	General Motors 6.3 L V8	LEC; 2						13th	28
2010	Applewood Seven	FLM	Oreca FLM09	General Motors 6.3 L V8			**ALG**; Ret	**HUN**; Ret	SIL		13th	28
2010	Matech Competition	LMGT1	Ford GT1	Ford 5.3 L V8		SPA; 2					6th	15
2011	TDS Racing	LMP2	Oreca 03	Nissan VK45DE 4.5 L V8	**LEC**; Ret	SPA; 1	**IMO**; 7	SIL; Ret	EST; 1		4th	38
2012	Thiriet by TDS Racing	LMP2	Oreca 03	Nissan VK45DE 4.5 L V8	**LEC**; 1	DON; 2	PET; 1				1st	94
2013	Thiriet by TDS Racing	LMP2	Oreca 03	Nissan VK45DE 4.5 L V8	SIL	IMO; 1	RBR; 1	HUN; 6	LEC; 8		6th	62
2016	Thiriet by TDS Racing	LMP2	Oreca 05	Nissan VK45DE 4.5 L V8	**SIL**; Ret	IMO; 1	RBR; 1	**LEC**; 1	SPA; 3	EST; 8	2nd	96
2019	Inter Europol Competition	LMP2	Ligier JS P217	Gibson GK428 4.2 L V8	LEC	MNZ	CAT	SIL	SPA; 12	ALG; Ret	35th	0.5
2022	TDS Racing x Vaillante	LMP2	Oreca 07	Gibson GK428 4.2 L V8	**LEC**; 10	IMO; 10	**MNZ**; 13	CAT; 11	SPA; 12	ALG; 11	22nd	4
2023	Nielsen Racing	LMP2 Pro-Am	Oreca 07	Gibson GK428 4.2 L V8	CAT; 4	LEC; 4	ARA; 2	SPA; Ret	ALG; 2	ALG; 3	4th	75
2024	Richard Mille by TDS	LMP2 Pro-Am	Oreca 07	Gibson GK428 4.2 L V8	CAT; 2	LEC; 1	IMO; 3	**SPA**; Ret	MUG; 1	ALG; 5	4th	94
2025	TDS Racing	LMP2 Pro-Am	Oreca 07	Gibson GK428 4.2 L V8	CAT; 3	LEC; 3	IMO; 4	SPA; 5	SIL; 4	ALG; 1	3rd	89

=== Complete FIA World Endurance Championship results ===
(key) (Races in bold indicate pole position) (Races in italics indicate fastest lap)

Year	Entrant	Class	Car	Engine	1	2	3	4	5	6	7	8	9	Rank	Points
2012	ADR-Delta	LMP2	Oreca 03	Nissan VK45DE 4.5 L V8	SEB	SPA	LMS	SIL	SÃO	BHR	FUJ	SHA; 1		35th	6
2013	Rebellion Racing	LMP1	Lola B12/60	Toyota (RV8KLM 3.4 L V8)	SIL; 6	SPA; 6	LMS; 13	SÃO; 3	COA; 4	FUJ; 3	SHA; 4	BHR; Ret		5th	63.5
2014	Rebellion Racing	LMP1	Lola B12/60	Toyota (RV8KLM 3.4 L V8)	SIL; 4	SPA; 7	LMS; 4	COA; 7	FUJ; 12	SHA; 7	BHR; 7	SÃO; 8		10th	64.5
2014	Rebellion Racing	LMP1-L	Lola B12/60	Toyota (RV8KLM 3.4 L V8)	1	1	1	1	2	1	2	2		1st	204
2015	Rebellion Racing	LMP1	Rebellion R-One	AER P60 2.4 L Turbo V6	SIL	SPA	LMS; 14	NÜR; 16	COA; 15	FUJ; 7	SHA; 7	BHR; 13		14th	14.5
2015	Rebellion Racing	LMP1-L	Rebellion R-One	AER P60 2.4 L Turbo V6			2	2	3	1	1	3		1st	134
2016	Rebellion Racing	LMP1	Rebellion R-One	AER P60 2.4 L Turbo V6	SIL	SPA	LMS	NÜR; 17	MEX	COA	FUJ			41st	0.5
2016	Rebellion Racing	LMP1-L	Rebellion R-One	AER P60 2.4 L Turbo V6				2						7th	18
2016	Manor	LMP2	Oreca 05	Nissan VK45DE 4.5 L V8								SHA; Ret	BHR	33rd	0
2017	Vaillante Rebellion	LMP2	Oreca 07	Gibson GK428 4.2 L V8	SIL; 9	SPA; 4	LMS; DSQ	NÜR; 4	MEX; 5	COA; 2	**FUJ**; DSQ	SHA; 3	BHR; 3	8th	85
2018–19	Rebellion Racing	LMP1	Rebellion R13	Gibson GL458 4.5 L V8	SPA; 3	LMS; 3	SIL; 1	FUJ; Ret	SHA; 5	SEB; Ret	SPA	LMS		6th	73
2021	Realteam Racing	LMP2	Oreca 07	Gibson GK428 4.2 L V8	SPA	ALG; 7	MNZ	LMS	BHR	BHR				22nd	9
2021	Realteam Racing	Pro-Am Cup	Oreca 07	Gibson GK428 4.2 L V8		1								10th	38
2022	ARC Bratislava	LMP2	Oreca 07	Gibson GK428 4.2 L V8	SEB; 13	SPA	LMS	MNZ; 11	FUJ	BHR; 13				25th	0
2022	ARC Bratislava	Pro-Am Cup	Oreca 07	Gibson GK428 4.2 L V8	4			4		4				5th	48
2023	Prema Racing	LMP2	Oreca 07	Gibson GK428 4.2 L V8	SEB	ALG	SPA	LMS	MNZ; 7	FUJ	BHR			19th	6

^{†} Non World Endurance Championship entries are ineligible to score points.

=== 24 Hours of Le Mans results ===
Year	Team	Co-Drivers	Car	Class	Laps	Pos.	Class Pos.
2012	(France) Thiriet by TDS Racing	(France) Pierre Thiriet (France) Christophe Tinseau	Oreca 03-Nissan	LMP2	353	8th	**2nd**
2013	(Switzerland) Rebellion Racing	(Italy) Andrea Belicchi (China) Congfu Cheng	Lola B12/60-Toyota	LMP1	275	40th	8th
2014	(Switzerland) Rebellion Racing	(France) Nicolas Prost (Germany) Nick Heidfeld	Rebellion R-One-Toyota	LMP1-L	360	4th	**1st**
2015	(Switzerland) Rebellion Racing	(France) Nicolas Prost (Germany) Nick Heidfeld	Rebellion R-One-AER	LMP1-L	330	23rd	**2nd**
2016	(France) Thiriet by TDS Racing	(Japan) Ryō Hirakawa (France) Pierre Thiriet	Oreca 05-Nissan	LMP2	241	DNF	DNF
2017	(Switzerland) Vaillante Rebellion	(Brazil) Nelson Piquet Jr. (Denmark) David Heinemeier Hansson	Oreca 07-Gibson	LMP2	364	DSQ	DSQ
2018	(Switzerland) Rebellion Racing	(United States) Gustavo Menezes (France) Thomas Laurent	Rebellion R13-Gibson	LMP1	376	**3rd**	**3rd**
2019	(Denmark) High Class Racing	(Denmark) Dennis Andersen (Denmark) Anders Fjordbach	Oreca 07-Gibson	LMP2	356	16th	11th
2022	(France) TDS Racing X Vaillante	(Netherlands) Nyck de Vries (Netherlands) Tijmen van der Helm	Oreca 07-Gibson	LMP2	368	8th	4th
2023	(United Kingdom) Nielsen Racing	(United Kingdom) Ben Hanley (United States) Rodrigo Sales	Oreca 07-Gibson	LMP2	18	DNF	DNF
2023	(United Kingdom) Nielsen Racing	(United Kingdom) Ben Hanley (United States) Rodrigo Sales	Oreca 07-Gibson	LMP2 Pro-Am	18	DNF	DNF
2024	(France) Panis Racing	(United States) Scott Huffaker (United States) Rodrigo Sales	Oreca 07-Gibson	LMP2	293	23rd	9th
2024	(France) Panis Racing	(United States) Scott Huffaker (United States) Rodrigo Sales	Oreca 07-Gibson	LMP2 Pro-Am	293	23rd	4th
2025	(France) TDS Racing	(France) Clément Novalak (United States) Rodrigo Sales	Oreca 07-Gibson	LMP2	365	22nd	5th
2025	(France) TDS Racing	(France) Clément Novalak (United States) Rodrigo Sales	Oreca 07-Gibson	LMP2 Pro-Am	365	22nd	**2nd**
2026	(France) TDS Racing	(France) Kévin Estre (Canada) Tobias Lütke	Oreca 07-Gibson	LMP2	355	27th	13th
2026	(France) TDS Racing	(France) Kévin Estre (Canada) Tobias Lütke	Oreca 07-Gibson	LMP2 Pro-Am	355	27th	5th

=== Complete Asian Le Mans Series results ===
(key) (Races in bold indicate pole position) (Races in italics indicate fastest lap)

Year	Team	Class	Car	Engine	1	2	3	4	5	6	Pos.	Points
2014	Craft-Bamboo Racing	CN	Ligier JS53	Honda 2.0 L I4	**INJ**; 1	**FUJ**; 1	SHA	SEP			3rd	52
2019–20	Inter Europol Endurance	LMP2	Ligier JS P217	Gibson GK428 4.2 L V8	SHA; 4	BEN; Ret	SEP; 5	BUR; 7			5th	28
2023	Nielsen Racing	LMP2	Oreca 07	Gibson GK428 4.2 L V8	DUB; 1; 4	DUB; 2; 3	ABU; 1; 6	ABU; 2; 8			6th	39
2023–24	ARC Bratislava	LMP2	Oreca 07	Gibson GK428 4.2 L V8	SEP; 1; 10	SEP; 2; 10	DUB; 10	ABU; 1; 11	ABU; 2; 8		14th	7
2024–25	Proton Competition	LMP2	Oreca 07	Gibson GK428 4.2 L V8	SEP; 1; 9	SEP; 2 WD	DUB; 1; 9	DUB; 2; 10	ABU; 1; 5	ABU; 2; 5	11th	23
2025–26	DKR Engineering	LMP2	Oreca 07	Gibson GK428 4.2 L V8	SEP; 1; 11	SEP; 2; 4	DUB; 1; 8	DUB; 2; 7	ABU; 1; 4	ABU; 2; 1	4th	59

=== Complete IMSA SportsCar Championship results ===
(key) (Races in bold indicate pole position) (Races in italics indicate fastest lap)

Year	Entrant	Class	Make	Engine	1	2	3	4	5	6	7	8	9	10	Pos.	Points
2017	JDC-Miller MotorSports	P	Oreca 07	Gibson GK428 4.2 L V8	DAY; 5	SEB	LBH	COA	DET	WGL	MOS	ELK	LGA		24th	49
2017	Rebellion Racing	P	Oreca 07	Gibson GK428 4.2 L V8										PET; 8	24th	49
2025	PR1/Mathiasen Motorsports	LMP2	Oreca 07	Gibson GK428 4.2 L V8	DAY; 3	SEB; 9	WGL; 12	MOS	ELK	IMS	PET				31st	786
2026	TDS Racing	LMP2	Oreca 07	Gibson GK428 4.2 L V8	DAY; 12	SEB	WGL; 10	MOS; 9	ELK; 3	IMS; 7	PET; 11				15th	1511

=== Complete Super GT results ===
(key) (Races in bold indicate pole position) (Races in italics indicate fastest lap)

Year	Team	Car	Class	1	2	3	4	5	6	7	8	DC	Points
2020	arto Ping An Team Thailand	Lexus RC F GT3	GT300	FUJ	FUJ	SUZ	MOT	FUJ	SUZ; 19	MOT; 23	FUJ; 26	NC	0

Sporting positions
Preceded by Tom Kimber-Smith; Karim Ojjeh (Le Mans Series - LMP2)	European Le Mans Series; Champion; 2012; With: Pierre Thiriet	Succeeded by Pierre Ragues; Nelson Panciatici
