= 2018 24 Hours of Le Mans =

86th 24 Hours of Le Mans endurance race

Previous: 2017	Next: 2019
Index: Races | Winners

Circuit de la Sarthe track

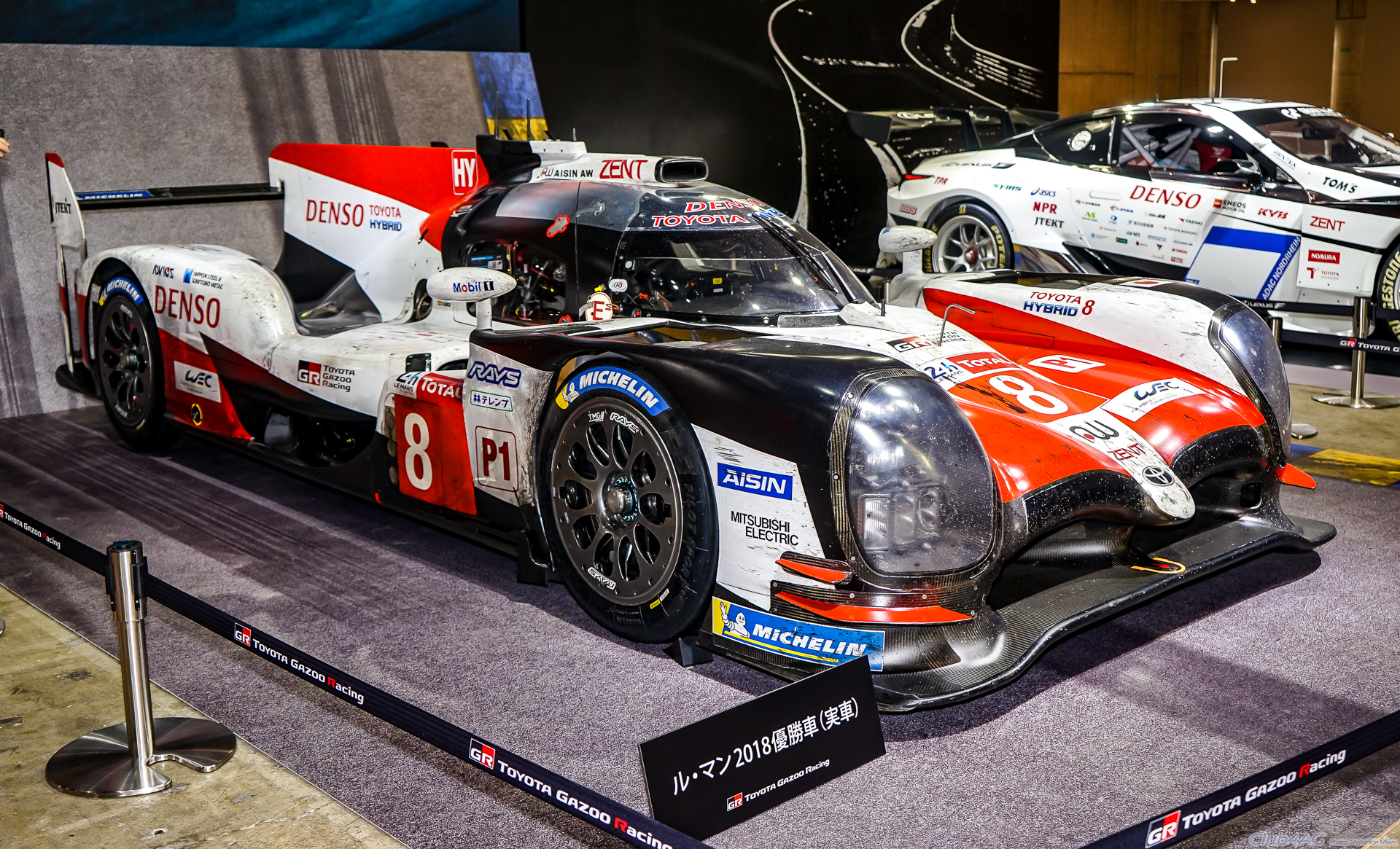
The race-winning No. 8 Toyota TS050 Hybrid

The 86th 24 Hours of Le Mans (French: 86^{e} 24 Heures du Mans) was an 24-hour automobile endurance race for Le Mans Prototype and Le Mans Grand Touring Endurance cars entered by teams of three drivers each held from 16 to 17 June 2018 at the Circuit de la Sarthe, close to Le Mans, France. It was the 86th running of the event, as organised by the automotive group, the Automobile Club de l'Ouest (ACO), since 1923. The race was the second round of the 2018–19 FIA World Endurance Championship, with 36 of the race's 60 entries contesting the series. Approximately 256,900 people attended the race. A test day was held two weeks prior to the race on 3 June.

A Toyota TS050 Hybrid car shared by Sébastien Buemi, Kazuki Nakajima and Fernando Alonso began from pole position after Nakajima recorded the fastest lap time in the third qualifying session. It and the sister Toyota of Mike Conway, Kamui Kobayashi and José María López exchanged the lead for most of the first half of the race until Buemi took a one-minute stop-and-go penalty for speeding in a slow zone that was enforced for an accident during the night. Alonso and Nakajima retook the lead from their teammates in the 16th hour and maintained it for the rest of the race to win. It was Alonso, Buemi and Nakajima's first Le Mans win and Toyota's first in its 20th try. The sister Toyota of Conway, Kobayashi and López finished two laps behind in second, and a Rebellion R13 vehicle driven by Thomas Laurent, Gustavo Menezes and Mathias Beche completed the podium in third.

The Le Mans Prototype 2 (LMP2) class was led for 360 consecutive laps by the G-Drive Racing Oreca 07 car of Roman Rusinov, Andrea Pizzitola and Jean-Éric Vergne and was the first team to finish the race. It was later disqualified for running an illegal refuelling component and G-Drive lost an appeal. The class victory was taken by the Signatech Alpine team of Nicolas Lapierre, Pierre Thiriet and André Negrão. A Graff-SO24 team of Vincent Capillaire, Jonathan Hirschi and Tristan Gommendy was second and a United Autosports Ligier JS P217 car driven by Hugo de Sadeleer, Will Owen and Juan Pablo Montoya finished third. On its 70th anniversary Porsche won both of the Le Mans Grand Touring Professional (LMGTE) categories with Michael Christensen, Kévin Estre and Laurens Vanthoor's No. 92 car ahead of the No. 91 911 RSR car of Richard Lietz, Gianmaria Bruni and Frédéric Makowiecki in Le Mans Grand Touring Professional (LMGTE Pro) and Dempsey-Proton's trio of Matt Campbell, Christian Ried and Julien Andlauer winning in Le Mans Grand Touring Amateur (LMGTE Am).

The result increased Alonso, Buemi and Nakajima's lead in the LMP Drivers' Championship to 20 points over their teammates Conway, Kobayashi and López. Beche, Laurent and Menezes retained third place and Lapierre, Thiriet and Negrão's victory in LMP2 moved them to fourth. In the GTE Drivers' Championship Christensen and Estre took the lead from Billy Johnson, Stefan Mücke and Olivier Pla. Toyota further extended their lead over Rebellion Racing in the LMP1 Teams' Championship to 27 points as Porsche went further ahead of Ford in the GTE Manufacturers' Championship with six races remaining in the season.

== Background ==
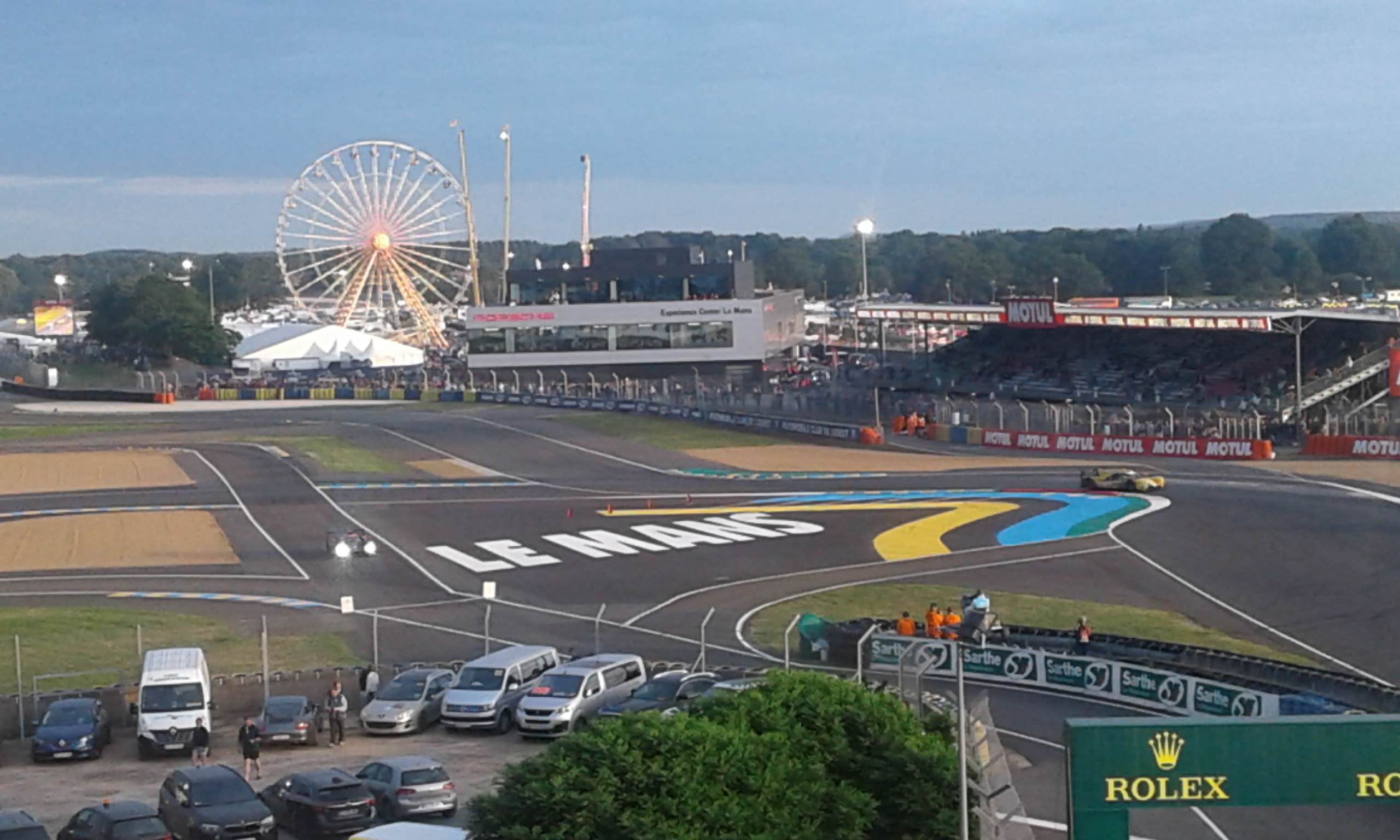
The Circuit de la Sarthe, where the race was held.

The dates for the 2018 24 Hours of Le Mans were confirmed at a meeting of the FIA World Motor Sport Council in its headquarters in Geneva, Switzerland on 19 June 2017. It was the 86th edition of the event, and the second of eight automobile endurance races of the 2018–19 FIA World Endurance Championship (WEC).

Before the race Toyota drivers Fernando Alonso, Sébastien Buemi and Kazuki Nakajima led the LMP Drivers' Championship with 26 points, eight ahead of their teammates Mike Conway, Kamui Kobayashi and José María López and a further three in front of Mathias Beche, Thomas Laurent and Gustavo Menezes of the Rebellion team. The ByKolles trio of Tom Dillmann, Dominik Kraihamer and Oliver Webb were fourth with 12 points and SMP Racing's Mikhail Aleshin and Vitaly Petrov were fifth with 10 points. In the GTE Drivers' Championship Billy Johnson, Stefan Mücke and Olivier Pla of Ford Chip Ganassi Racing led with 25 points, ahead of the Porsche duo of Michael Christensen and Kévin Estre in second and AF Corse's Davide Rigon and Sam Bird third. Toyota (26 points) led the LMP1 Teams' Championship by 11 points over Rebellion in second. The ByKolles team was a further three points behind in third as Porsche led Ford by four points in the GTE Manufacturers' Championship.

== Circuit changes ==
After the 2017 24 Hours of Le Mans, modifications were made to the Porsche Curves section of the Circuit de la Sarthe to increase safety. Barriers on the inside of the final right-hand corner were dismantled and relocated further away from the circuit, allowing for the construction of paved run-off area and escape roads. This same alteration had been done on the barriers outside the corner in 2017. This modification re-profiled the corner slightly, shortening the lap distance by 3 m (9.8 ft). The ACO also constructed a new starting line gantry 145 m (476 ft) further up the main straight to increase the capacity for cars at the start of the race. The finish line and all timing beacons remained at the previous starting line at the exit of the Ford Chicane.

== Entries ==
=== Automatic entries ===
Automatic entry invitations were earned by teams that won their class in the 2017 24 Hours of Le Mans. Invitations were also sent to teams who had won championships in the European Le Mans Series (ELMS), Asian Le Mans Series (ALMS), and the Michelin GT3 Le Mans Cup. The second-place finisher in the 2017 ELMS Le Mans Grand Touring Endurance (LMGTE) championship earned an automatic invitation as well. Finally, the ACO choose two participants from the IMSA SportsCar Championship (IMSA) to be automatic entries regardless of their performance or category. As invitations were granted to teams, they were allowed to change their cars from the previous year to the next but not their category. The LMGTE class invitations from the European and ALMS were allowed to choose between the Pro and Am categories. ELMS' Le Mans Prototype 3 (LMP3) champion was required to field an entry in Le Mans Prototype 2 (LMP2) while the 2017–18 ALMS LMP3 champion could choose between LMP2 or LMGTE Amateur (LMGTE Am). The 2017 Michelin Le Mans Cup LMP3 champion did not receive an automatic entry and the Grand Touring 3 (GT3) champion was limited to the LMGTE Am category.

The ACO announced its initial list of automatic entries on 5 February 2018. The Porsche LMP Team did not continue in the WEC after the 2017 season while the FIST-Team AAI squad opted to concentrate on their GT3 entries. The JDC-Miller Motorsports team, which was invited via driver Misha Goikhberg winning the Jim Trueman Award as "the top sportsman" in the Daytona Prototype International (DPi) category of the 2017 IMSA, told ACO officials on 9 February that it would forgo its automatic invitation due to financial trouble concerning its entry.

Automatic entries for the 2018 24 Hours of Le Mans
Reason invited	LMP1	LMP2	LMGTE Pro	LMGTE Am
1st in the 24 Hours of Le Mans	(Germany) Porsche LMP Team	(China) Jackie Chan DC Racing	(United Kingdom) Aston Martin Racing	(United Kingdom) JMW Motorsport
1st in the European Le Mans Series (LMP2 and LMGTE)		(Russia) G-Drive Racing	(United Kingdom) JMW Motorsport	
2nd in the European Le Mans Series (LMGTE)			(United Kingdom) TF Sport	
1st in the European Le Mans Series (LMP3)		(United States) United Autosports		
IMSA SportsCar Championship at-large entries		(United States) JDC-Miller Motorsports		(United States) Keating Motorsport
1st in the Asian Le Mans Series (LMP2 and GT)		(China) Jackie Chan DC Racing X Jota	(Taiwan) FIST-Team AAI	
1st in the Asian Le Mans Series (LMP3)		(China) Jackie Chan DC Racing X Jota		
2nd in the Asian Le Mans Series (GT)				(Taiwan) FIST-Team AAI
1st in the Michelin Le Mans Cup (GT3)				(Italy) Ebimotors

=== Entry list ===
In conjunction with the announcement of entries for the 2018–19 FIA World Endurance Championship and the 2018 European Le Mans Series, the ACO announced the full 60 car entry list, plus nine reserves during a press conference at the Rétromobile Show in Paris on 9 February. In addition to the 36 guaranteed entries from the WEC, 13 came from the ELMS, seven from IMSA, three from the ALMS and a single one-off entry only competing at Le Mans. The field was split evenly with 30 cars in each of the combined LMP and LMGTE categories.

=== Garage 56 ===
The ACO intended to continue the Garage 56 concept, started in 2012. Garage 56 allows a 56th entry to test new technologies at the race. Panoz and Green4U Technologies announced during the 2017 24 Hours of Le Mans weekend they intended to enter its Green4U Panoz Racing GT-EV car in the 2018 race. The all-wheel drive car intended to utilise two electric motors on each of its axles with a swappable battery lasting between 90 and 110 mi (140 and 180 km) within a tandem style LMP body. On 8 February, the ACO confirmed the Garage 56 concept would not be continued for 2018 due to a lack of feasible options.

=== Reserves ===
Nine reserves were initially nominated by the ACO, limited to the LMP2 (six cars) and LMGTE Am (three cars) categories. ARC Bratislava announced the termination of its ELMS LMP2 programme on 11 February after its Ligier JS P217 car was placed eighth in the reserves list and leaving the team unlikely to be promoted to the race entry. Six days later, IDEC Sport withdrew its reserve JS P217 entry so that the team could concentrate on improving the performance of its entered No. 28 car. By the test day, two reserves remained on the list after five of the seven entries withdrew: KCMG's Dallara P217 entry and a Racing Engineering Oreca 07 car.

== Pre-race balance of performance changes ==
The FIA Endurance Committee altered the equivalence of technology in the LMP classes and the balance of performance in the LMGTE categories to try and create parity within them. All non-hybrid LMP vehicles had their fuel flow of petrol per hour reduced from 110 kilograms per hour (243 lb/h) to 108 kilograms per hour (238 lb/h). The Toyota TS050 Hybrid cars had no performance alterations.

For the LMGTE categories the Aston Martin Vantage GTE vehicles received an extra 5 kg (11 lb) of weight and a minor reduction in turbocharger boost pressure as The BMW M8 GTE had 13 kg (29 lb) of weight added and a reduction of power to lower their performances. The Porsche 911 RSR received a reduction in performance with a 0.6 mm (0.024 in) smaller air restrictor on the intake of its engine, the Ferrari 488 GTE vehicles had an extra 11 kg (24 lb) of weight added to it and the Ford GT was made 12 kg (26 lb) heavier and an increase in turbocharger boost pressure. In the LMGTE Am class the Aston Martin and Porsche vehicles had their top speeds lowered with a smaller air restrictor and the Ferrari had its turbocharger boost pressure reduced.

== Testing ==
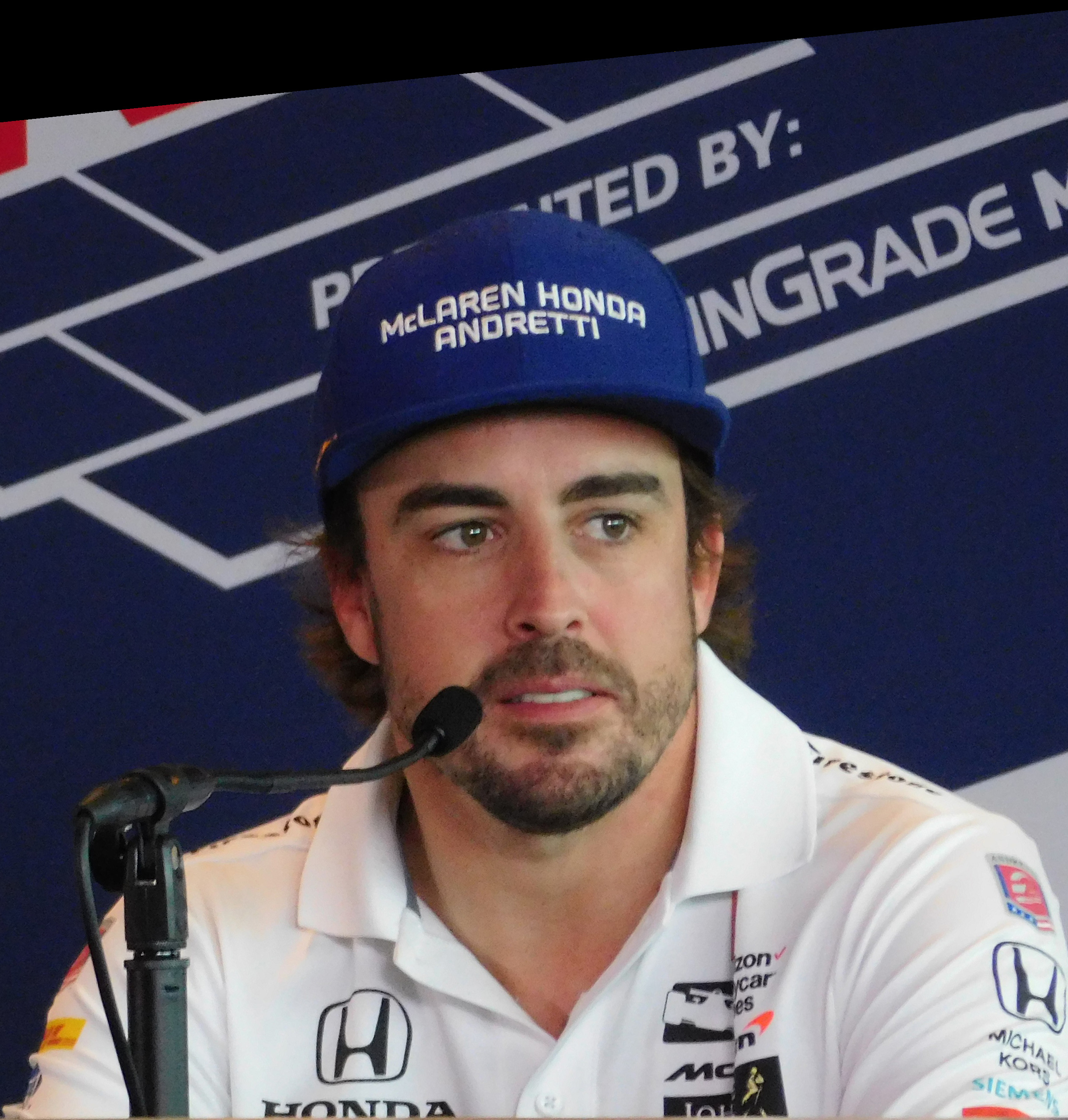
Fernando Alonso (pictured in 2017) recorded the fastest overall lap in testing

A test day was held on 3 June and required all race entrants to participate in eight hours of track time divided into two sessions. Toyota led the morning session with a 3:21.468 lap from Alonso's No. 8 TS050 car. The fastest non-hybrid car was Laurent in the No. 3 Rebellion R13 vehicle, ahead of Conway's Toyota, the sister Rebellion team of Bruno Senna, and the No. 17 SMP BR Engineering BR1 car driven by Stéphane Sarrazin. Oreca vehicles led the LMP2 category with seven cars at the top of the timing charts, with the No. 26 G-Drive entry driven by the team's reserve driver Alexandre Imperatori seven-tenths of a second ahead of the No. 48 IDEC Sport car of Paul-Loup Chatin. Ford took the first four positions in the LMGTE Pro class, the No. 67 car of Andy Priaulx leading Mücke's No. 66 entry with a 3:53.008 lap. Late in the session, the No. 95 Aston Martin of Marco Sørensen and Harrison Newey's No. 35 SMP Dallara vehicle made contact in traffic between Mulsanne and Indianapolis corners, causing Sørensen to crash heavily against a barrier beside the circuit and prematurely end the session with 51 minutes to go. Sørensen was unhurt; he was transported to the circuit's medical centre for a precautionary check before being released and Aston Martin switched to a spare chassis. The Clearwater Racing Ferrari car was fastest in the LMGTE Am category with a lap of 3:58.967 from driver Keita Sawa.

The second test session started half an hour earlier than scheduled to give teams more time on the circuit. Toyota again led from the start with a lap from Kobayashi in the No. 7, followed by Alonso's 3:19.066 time to top the session. Beche improved the No. 3 Rebellion's lap to duplicate its first session result in second place. The second Rebellion car of André Lotterer set a lap late on to go fourth, ahead of Vitaly Petrov's No. 11 SMP car. Nathanaël Berthon improved the fastest lap in LMP2, moving the DragonSpeed team ahead of Chatin and G-Drive's Jean-Éric Vergne and Matthieu Vaxivière. Patrick Pilet in the No. 93 Porsche and Gianmaria Bruni's No. 91 car passed Priaulx's No. 66 and Olivier Pla's No. 67 Ford cars in LMGTE Pro. Another Porsche in LMGTE Am, driven by Julien Andlauer for the Dempsey-Proton team, overtook Sawa's fastest time from the morning session to be ahead of Giancarlo Fisichella's Spirit of Race Ferrari. Two safety car periods were required after separate crashes by Alessandro Pier Guidi's No. 51 AF Corse Ferrari at Tetre Rouge corner and António Félix da Costa's No. 82 BMW in the Porsche Curves.

=== Post-testing balance of performance changes ===
Following testing the ACO altered the balance of performance for a second time in the LMGTE Pro and Am categories. The Aston Martin Vantage GTE received an increase in performance with its turbocharger boost pressure raised and a 4 L (0.88 imp gal; 1.1 US gal) increase in maximum fuel volume. BMW and Ford had their car's performance raised with a minor increase in turbocharger boost ratio; the Ford's fuel allocation was lowered by 2 L (0.44 imp gal; 0.53 US gal). The Chevrolet Corvette C7.R, BMW and Ford vehicles received weight increases. Porsche had no performance changes. In LMGTE Am the Aston Martin Vantage was given an increase of 2 L (0.44 imp gal; 0.53 US gal). Porsche and Ferrari had no performance alterations.

== Practice ==
A single four-hour free practice session on 13 June was available to the teams before the three qualifying sessions. Rain forecast for 14 June prompted several teams to set laps at full racing speed in anticipation of the first qualifying session determining the race's starting order. Toyota led from the start once again, with Kobayashi going fastest in the final 20 minutes at 3:18.718, half a second faster than Buemi in second. Laurent and Ben Hanley of the DragonSpeed team were third and fourth and Jenson Button for the SMP squad completed the top five. Oreca cars took the first five positions in the LMP2 category with a lap of 3:26.529 from Vergne, followed by Chatin, Loïc Duval of the TDS Racing team, Berthon and Tristan Gommendy for the Graff squad.

The No. 37 Jackie Chan car of Nabil Jeffri sustained right-front corner damage in a crash at Indianapolis corner mid-way through the session and the car did not return to the circuit. Porsches led the first three positions in LMGTE Pro with a lap of 3:50.819 from Laurens Vanthoor's No. 92 RSR leading the class until his teammate Pilet overtook him with 20 minutes to go. Pla was the fastest non-Porsche in fourth and Miguel Molina's No. 71 AF Corse Ferrari was fifth. Matteo Cairoli helped Porsche to be fastest in LMGTE Am, ahead of Ben Barker's Gulf car and Fisichella. Pilet had an accident at the exit to the first Mulsanne Chicane, damaging the No. 93 car against a tyre wall and scattering debris on the circuit. A local slow zone was required after Michael Wainwright beached the No. 86 Gulf Porsche in a gravel trap at the Dunlop Curve.

== Qualifying ==
The first of three qualifying sessions to set the race's starting order with the quickest lap times set by each team's fastest driver began late Wednesday night under dry conditions, as Toyota again led the time sheets early on with a lap from López, followed by Nakajima's 3:17.270 time after eight minutes to go fastest. Neither improved their lap times over the rest of the session, giving the No. 8 car provisional pole position. The fastest non-hybrid car was Sarrazin's SMP entry in third, following the Rebellion cars of Senna and Menezes. The fastest LMP2 lap was a 3:24.956 time from Chatin and early category pace setter Duval was second. Vergne, DragonSpeed's Pastor Maldonado and Nicolas Lapierre of the Signatech Alpine team were third to fifth in class. Porsche took the first two positions in the LMGTE Pro class with a lap of 3:47.504 from Bruni to reset the category lap record at his first attempt. Bruni lost control of the rear of the No. 92 car into the Dunlop Curves and spun through 180 degrees into a gravel trap soon after. Christensen in second was a tenth of a second faster than the Ford cars of Pla and Mücke. The fastest Ferrari was fifth after a lap by Per Guidi. Cairoli led the LMGTE Am class with a 3:50.669 lap, followed by his Dempsey-Proton teammate Matt Campbell and Barker.

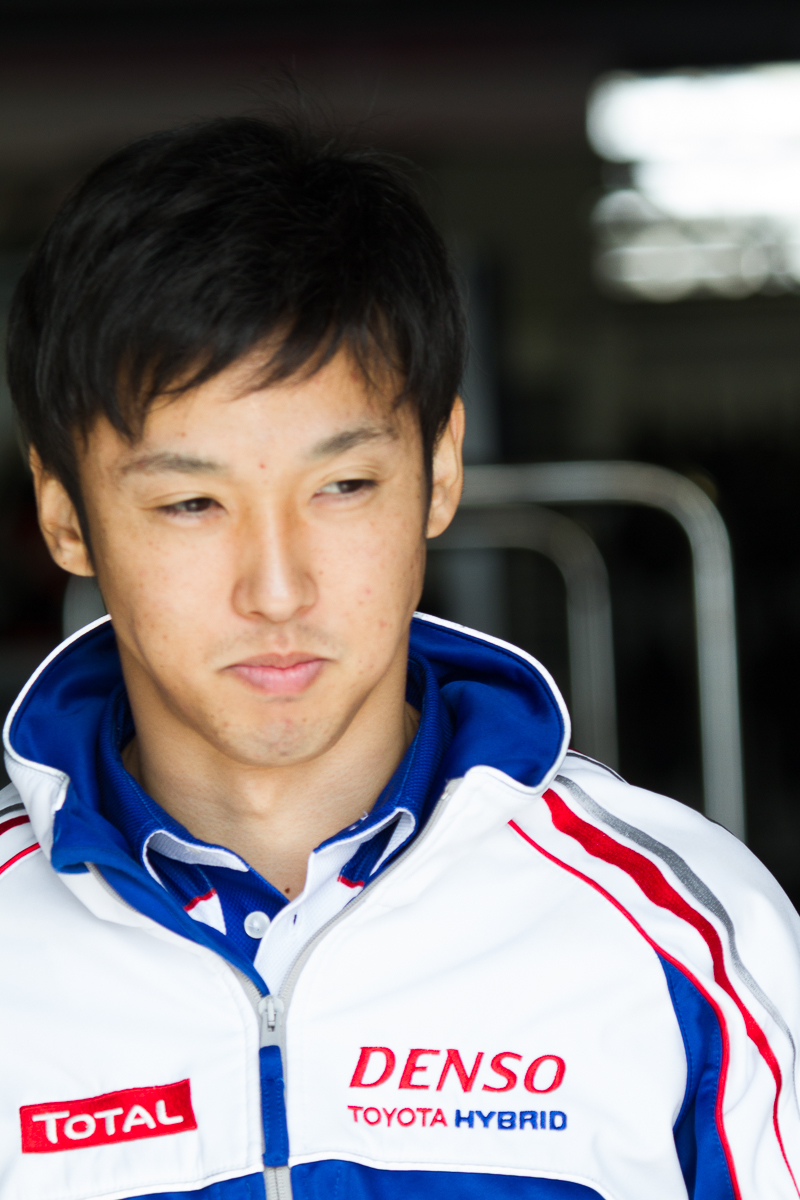
Kazuki Nakajima (pictured in 2012) took pole position for Toyota in the third qualifying session.

Thursday's first qualifying session was stopped three times for crashes. Sven Müller caused rear damage to the No. 94 Porsche against a tyre wall at Indianapolis corner. Priaulx spun at the entry to Tetre Rouge corner with his left-rear wheel on the grass and damaged his car's rear in a collision with a tyre barrier. He was able to restart the car but the damage to the barriers caused a red flag. This was followed by the right-rear suspension on Lapierre's car failing on a kerb and sending him into a gravel trap. He continued to the pit lane and the session was stopped for nine minutes to allow track marshals to clear gravel strewn on the circuit. The session ended with 38 minutes to go after Giorgio Sernagiotto crashed the No. 47 Cetilar Vilorba Corse Dallara car against a tyre barrier opposite the first Mulsanne chicane after a front-left puncture. Sernagiotto was unhurt and was transported to the medical centre for a mandatory check-up. The car was required in time for the warm-up session. Alonso led the session with a lap of 3:18.021; he did not improve on co-driver Nakajima's lap from the first session. The two LMP1 entries to improve their lap times was the CEFC TRSM Ginetta G60-LT-P1 cars of Alex Brundle and Charlie Robertson. The IDEC team maintained its advantage in LMP2 as Porsche continued to lead in LMGTE Pro and Am. Fisichella's Spirit of Race Ferrari overtook the Gulf squad for third in LMGTE Am.

With the multiple stoppages in qualifying, the third session was expanded by half an hour in order to give teams more time on the circuit. It took place in cooler conditions and there was more grip added to the circuit. Early in the session Nakajima reset the fastest time to a 3:15.377 without slower traffic impeding him. He took Toyota's fourth pole position at Le Mans and Alonso's, Buemi's and Nakajima's first. The No. 7 Toyota team could not improve the car's fastest lap and began from second. The Rebellion team were third and fifth with Senna ahead of Laurent after officials invalidated the latter's fastest time for failing to stop at a red light instructing him to enter the scrutineering bay. Sarrazin's SMP car separated the duo in fourth. In LMP2, Duval took the category pole position from Chatin until his fastest time was deleted for missing a red light to enter the scrutineering bay. Berthon took second and Vergne was third. Porsche secured pole position in both of the LMGTE classes with Bruni securing it in Pro courtesy of a slipstream from an LMP2-class vehicle and Cairoli in Am courtesy of their laps from the first session. Per Guidi led the session to move the No. 51 Ferrari to fourth in LMGTE Pro as Barker improved the Gulf team's lap to be six-tenths of a second behind the Dempsey-Proton squad. A slow zone procedure was used after Matt Griffin beached the Clearwater Ferrari in a gravel trap at Indianapolis corner and track marshals extricated it.

=== Post-qualifying ===
Following qualifying, the ACO altered the balance of performance in the LMGTE categories for the third time. 10 kg (22 lb) of ballast was removed from the BMW M8 and the Aston Martin Vantage while the Corvette C7.R car was made 5 kg (11 lb) lighter. The Porsche 911 car had its weight increased by 10 kg (22 lb) and the Ford GT vehicles were lightened by 8 kg (18 lb). The Ferrari 488 received an 1 L (0.22 imp gal; 0.26 US gal) increase in fuel capacity. In LMGTE Am, Aston Martin received a 10 kg (22 lb) decrease of weight and Porsche had 10 kg (22 lb) added to their cars. Ferrari had no performance changes. The world governing body of motor racing, the Fédération Internationale de l'Automobile (FIA), restricted all LMGTE Pro cars to a maximum of 14 laps per stint.

=== Qualifying results ===
Pole position winners in each class are indicated in bold. The fastest time set by each entry is denoted in gray.

Final qualifying classification
Pos.	Class	No.	Team	Qualifying 1	Qualifying 2	Qualifying 3	Gap	Grid
1	LMP1	8	**Toyota Gazoo Racing**	**3:17.270**	**3:18.021**	**3:15.377**		1
2	LMP1	7	Toyota Gazoo Racing	3:17.377	3:19.860	3:17.523	+2.000	2
3	LMP1	1	Rebellion Racing	3:19.662	3:23.261	3:19.449	+4.072	3
4	LMP1	17	SMP Racing	3:19.483	3:27.288	3:22.121	+4.106	4
5	LMP1	3	Rebellion Racing	3:19.945	3:22.000	3:24.156	+4.568	5
6	LMP1	10	DragonSpeed	3:21.110	4:05.947	3:23.413	+5.733	6
7	LMP1	11	SMP Racing	3:21.408	3:22.548	No time	+6.031	7
8	LMP1	4	ByKolles Racing Team	3:22.505	3:25.330	3:42.221	+7.128	8
9	LMP1	6	CEFC TRSM Racing	3:30.339	3:24.343	3:23.757	+8.380	9
10	LMP2	48	**IDEC Sport**	**3:24.956**	3:29.270	**3:24.842** (Note: The No. 33 DC Racing Ligier and No. 48 IDEC Oreca had their fastest lap time deleted for failing to slow to 80 km/h (50 mph) in a Slow Zone.)	+9.465	10
11	LMP2	31	DragonSpeed	3:26.508	3:30.168	3:24.883	+9.506	11
12	LMP2	26	G-Drive Racing	3:26.447	3:27.975	3:25.160	+9.780	12
13	LMP2	28	TDS Racing	3:25.240	**3:25.291**	3:38.752 (Note: The No. 28 TDS Oreca, No. 44 Eurasia Ligier, and No. 6 TRSM Ginetta-Mechachrome had several lap times deleted for failing to stop for a mandatory weight check. These included their fastest times of the session.)	+9.863	13
14	LMP1	5	CEFC TRSM Racing	3:30.481	3:25.268	3:32.100	+9.891	14
15	LMP2	23	Panis Barthez Competition	3:29.421	3:28.008	3:25.376	+9.999	15
16	LMP2	36	Signatech Alpine Matmut	3:26.681	3:28.069	3:27.297	+11.304	16
17	LMP2	39	Graff-SO24	3:29.860	3:26.701	3:29.696	+11.324	17
18	LMP2	22	United Autosports	3:26.772	3:32.989	3:27.646	+11.395	18
19	LMP2	38	Jackie Chan DC Racing	3:27.999	3:31.581	3:27.120	+11.743	19
20	LMP2	37	Jackie Chan DC Racing	3:27.468	3:40.074	3:27.226	+11.849	20
21	LMP2	40	G-Drive Racing	3:31.291	3:27.280	3:27.503	+11.903	21
22	LMP2	47	Cetilar Villorba Corse	3:27.993	3:28.292	No time	+12.616	22
23	LMP2	29	Racing Team Nederland	3:28.556	3:32.343	3:28.111	+12.734	23
24	LMP2	32	United Autosports	3:30.347	3:28.159	3:29.299	+12.782	24
25	LMP2	35	SMP Racing	3:28.629	3:32.178	3:32.432	+13.252	25
26	LMP2	34	Jackie Chan DC Racing	3:33.755	3:36.004	3:29.474	+14.097	26
27	LMP2	44	Eurasia Motorsport	3:35.385	3:39.949	3:33.585	+18.208	27
28	LMP2	33	Jackie Chan DC Racing	3:35.237	3:36.604	3:36.517	+19.860	28
29	LMP2	50	Larbre Compétition	3:38.206	3:39.569	3:39.401	+22.829	29
30	LMP2	25	Algarve Pro Racing	3:44.177	3:46.772	3:39.518	+24.141	30
31	LMGTE Pro	91	**Porsche GT Team**	**3:47.504**	3:51.150	3:50.141	+32.127	31
32	LMGTE Pro	92	Porsche GT Team	3:49.097	3:51.101	3:51.631	+33.720	32
33	LMGTE Pro	66	Ford Chip Ganassi Team UK	3:49.181	3:52.849	3:50.166	+33.804	33
34	LMGTE Pro	51	AF Corse	3:49.854	3:53.032	**3:49.494**	+34.117	34
35	LMGTE Pro	68	Ford Chip Ganassi Team USA	3:49.582	3:53.352	3:50.706	+34.205	35
36	LMGTE Pro	93	Porsche GT Team	3:50.261	**3:49.621**	3:49.589	+34.212	36
37	LMGTE Pro	69	Ford Chip Ganassi Team USA	3:50.593	3:52.298	3:49.761	+34.384	37
38	LMGTE Pro	94	Porsche GT Team	3:50.089	No time	No time	+34.712	38
39	LMGTE Pro	63	Corvette Racing – GM	3:50.789	3:52.994	3:50.242	+34.865	39
40	LMGTE Pro	71	AF Corse	3:50.669	3:53.998	3:50.246	+34.869	40
41	LMGTE Pro	67	Ford Chip Ganassi Team UK	3:50.429	3:53.883	3:52.292	+35.052	41
42	LMGTE Pro	82	BMW Team MTEK	3:50.579	3:53.999	3:52.123	+35.202	42
43	LMGTE Pro	81	BMW Team MTEK	3:50.596	3:55.150	3:53.078	+35.219	43
44	LMGTE Am	88	**Dempsey-Proton Racing**	**3:50.728**	4:09.946	3:56.232	+35.351	44
45	LMGTE Pro	64	Corvette Racing – GM	3:50.952	3:52.923	3:51.124	+35.575	45
46	LMGTE Pro	52	AF Corse	3:52.112	3:52.572	3:50.957	+35.580	46
47	LMGTE Am	86	Gulf Racing UK	3:52.517	4:03.603	**3:51.391**	+36.014	47
48	LMGTE Am	77	Dempsey-Proton Racing	3:51.930	4:09.835	No time	+36.553	48
49	LMGTE Am	54	Spirit of Race	3:52.756	**3:51.956**	3:56.496	+36.579	49
50	LMGTE Pro	97	Aston Martin Racing	3:52.486	3:55.424	3:53.534	+37.109	50
51	LMGTE Am	56	Team Project 1	3:52.985	3:58.235	3:54.406	+37.608	51
52	LMGTE Am	90	TF Sport	3:55.661	4:01.710	3:53.070	+37.693	52
53	LMGTE Am	80	Ebimotors	3:55.569	3:58.072	3:53.402	+38.025	53
54	LMGTE Am	61	Clearwater Racing	3:55.076	3:55.727	3:53.409	+38.032	54
55	LMGTE Am	84	JMW Motorsport	3:54.384	3:53.439	3:58.615	+38.062	55
56	LMGTE Pro	95	Aston Martin Racing	3:54.780	3:56.630	3:53.523	+38.146	56
57	LMGTE Am	98	Aston Martin Racing	3:54.307	3:58.707	3:53.817	+38.440	57
58	LMGTE Am	85	Keating Motorsport	3:54.000	3:58.661	3:54.668	+38.623	58
59	LMGTE Am	99	Proton Competition	4:03.107	3:54.720	3:54.953	+39.343	59
60	LMGTE Am	70	MR Racing	3:54.951	4:02.540	3:55.343	+39.574	60

== Warm-up ==
A 45-minute warm-up session was held on Saturday morning and took place in dry and sunny weather. Kobayashi set the fastest lap of 3:18.687 in Toyota's No. 7 car, ahead of his teammate Buemi in second. Hanley's DragonSpeed BR1 was third and the fastest non-hybrid LMP1 car. The No. 17 SMP car and the No. 1 Rebellion vehicle were fourth and fifth. The fastest LMP2 lap was recorded by Ricky Taylor in Jackie Chan's No. 34 Ligier car at 3:29.466 to demote Vergne from the lead of the class. Lapierre was second for the Signatech Alpine team. Scott Dixon, driving the No. 69 Ford GT car, was the quickest driver in LMGTE Pro with Jeroen Bleekemolen in Keating Motorsport's Ferrari fastest in LMGTE Am.

== Race ==
=== Start and first hours ===
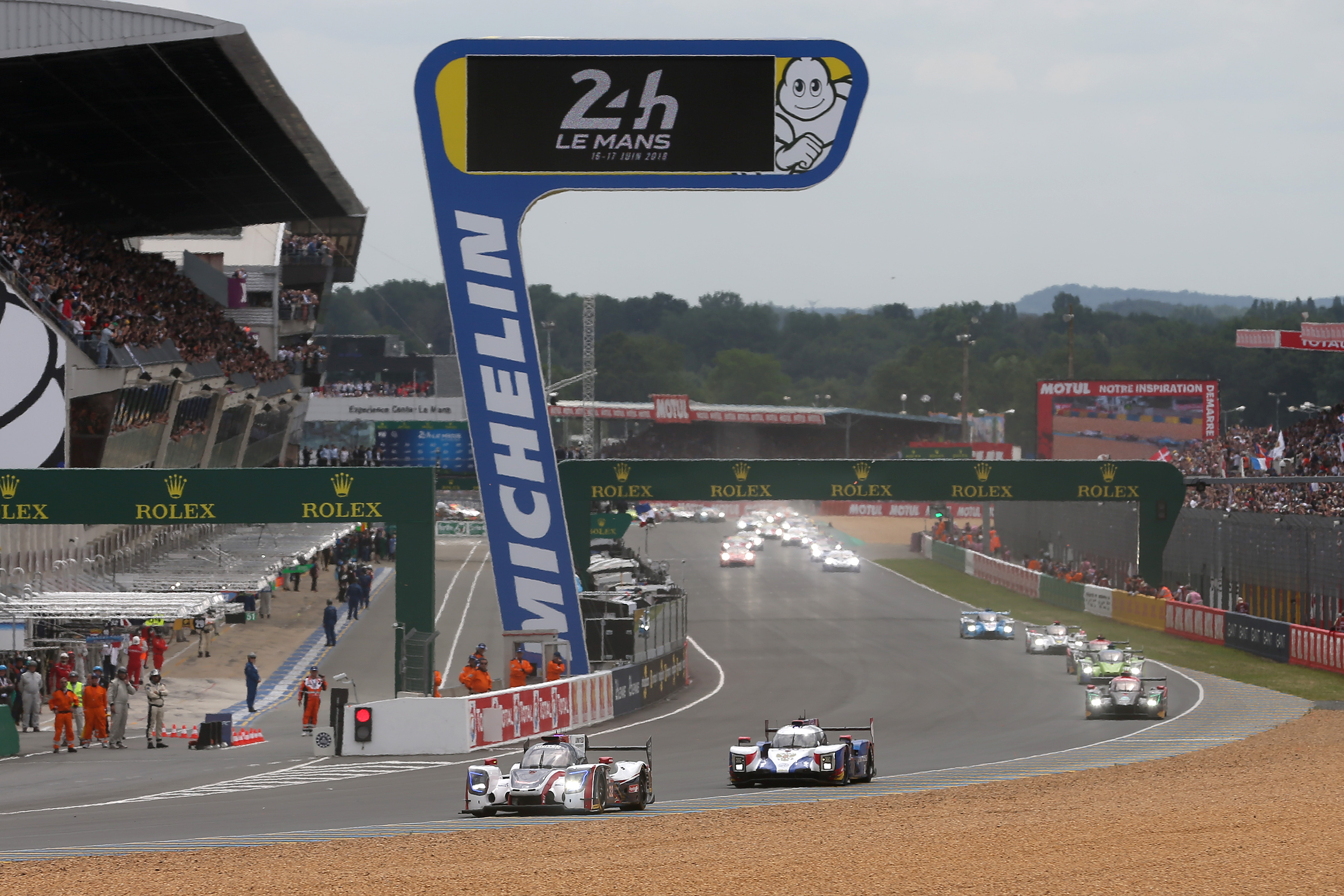
The start of the 2018 24 Hours of Le Mans

The conditions on the grid were dry and sunny before the race; the air temperature was between 15 and 22 °C (59 and 72 °F) and the track temperature ranged from 14 to 31 °C (57 to 88 °F). Approximately 256,900 people attended the event. The French tricolour was waved at 15:00 Central European Summer Time (UTC+02:00), by multiple Grand Slam tennis champion Rafael Nadal to start the race, led by starting pole sitter Buemi. At the start of the parade lap, a misfiring engine and a subsequent spin on cold tyres at the Dunlop Curve dropped Tom Dillmann's No. 4 ByKolles car to the rear of the field. A mounting failure detached the front bodywork on Lotterer's No. 1 Rebellion vehicle and removed downforce from the car entering the Dunlop Curve. It struck the rear of Hanley's DragonSpeed BR1 car. Both cars dropped down the race order. Conway passed Buemi to lead the first four laps until Buemi passed him on the fifth lap. Rain fell during this period though it was not heavy enough to affect the race. Laurent passed Sarrazin's No. 17 BR1 car for third on the Mulsanne Straight before Sarrazin returned to third place by slipstreaming past Laurent into Mulsanne corner. The first hour ended with Vergne passing Duval for the lead of LMP2 and Chatin fell to third. The Porsches of Bruni and Estre duelled for first place in LMGTE Pro as Barker overtook Carioli for the top of LMGTE Am.

Buemi relinquished the lead to his teammate Conway after the No. 8 Toyota made an unscheduled pit stop to have its rear crash structure replaced and the car rejoined the race in second position. Berthon ceded fourth place in LMP2 after a front-right wheel detached on the approach to Arnage corner and lost three laps as a new wheel hub assembly was installed onto the car. 1 hour and 40 minutes in, Wainwright's No. 86 Gulf Porsche lost control under braking and crashed into an Armco steel barrier on the outside at Indianapolis turn with its left-hand corner, requiring a slow zone between Mulsanne and Arnage corners to recover the car and to repair the barrier. Conway used the slow zone and a routine pit stop from his teammate Buemi to return to the lead on lap 32. As the second hour ended, Sébastien Bourdais's No. 68 Ford, which moved to second place in LMGTE Pro after a pit stop sequence, was passed by Frédéric Makowiecki's No. 92 Porsche entering the Mulsanne corner and the No. 77 Dempsey-Proton led in LMGTE Am. He continued to advance through the order and overtook his Porsche teammate Vanthoor for the lead of LMGTE Pro with the two cars running nose-to-tail. During a pit stop to relieve Buemi, television footage appeared to show Alonso reversing in the pit lane to pass a LMGTE vehicle parked ahead of him. Footage released later confirmed Alonso had not reversed but was moved back by mechanics, preventing the car from being disqualified.

In the fourth hour, Alonso overtook his teammate López in the Porsche Curves to retake the lead in the No. 8 Toyota. Bourdais used a battle between the Porsche duo of Vanthoor and Makowiecki on the Mulsanne Straight to take the lead of LMGTE Pro. Not long after the left-rear tyre on Gabriel Aubry's No. 38 Jackie Chan Oreca failed on the Mulsanne Straight, littering the track with debris and removing the car's front-left fender. Aubry retained control of the vehicle to allow him to return to the pit lane and the incident required the deployment of the safety cars to slow the race. The safety cars were withdrawn after 15 minutes and racing resumed. The safety cars had separated the LMGTE Pro field, the No. 92 Porsche led by more than a minute from the sister No. 91 due to Richard Lietz being required to remain in the pit lane. Although López made an unscheduled pit stop to replace a left-rear puncture, he took the lead from his teammate Alonso and led by 4 1/2 seconds. Antonio Giovinazzi in the No. 52 AF Corse Ferrari overtook Dixon on the outside for second in LMGTE Pro. Soon after Dominik Kraihamer was lapping slower LMGTE cars in the Porsche Curves when the rear of the No. 4 ByKolles car and the front of the No. 80 Ebimotors Porsche made contact. Kraihamer's rear wing was removed sending him into a collision against a concrete wall at Corvette corner. Kraihamer was unhurt; the crash caused the deployment of the safety cars for half an hour as marshals repaired the barrier and cleared the track of debris.

=== Early evening to night ===
As the safety car period ended the Toyota cars of López and Alonso scythed their way through heavy traffic. Toyota then invoked team orders on López to return the lead to Alonso entering Arnage turn one lap later. The safety cars had divided the field in LMGTE Pro, leaving Nicky Catsburg's No. 81 BMW in second place and the two class Porsches of Earl Bamber and Lietz in third and fourth. Juan Pablo Montoya, driving the No. 23 United Autosports car, crashed into a tyre barrier at Indianapolis corner and activated a local slow zone. Marshals extricated the car from the gravel and Montoya continued. Pierre Thiriet was caught out by the exit of the slow zone. He lost control of the rear of the Signatech car at Mulsanne turn and fell to fourth in LMP2. In the seventh hour, Pilet and Bruni overtook Martin Tomczyk's BMW car for second and third in LMGTE Pro as Romain Dumas' No. 94 vehicle slowed in the Porsche Curves and retired with a front-right suspension bracket failure. Not long after Paul Dalla Lana was en route to the pit lane when he lost control of the No. 98 Aston Martin and crashed against a tyre barrier at the entrance to the Porsche Curves. The damage to the car caused its retirement and required a local slow zone. Vergne used the slow zone to increase his lead over the LMP2 field to almost two minutes and Kobayashi closed to within less than a second of Nakajima.

As night fell, Kobayashi passed Buemi to return to the lead of the race. The No. 91 Porsche of Makowiecki was elevated to second in LMGTE Pro ahead of the No. 93 of Nick Tandy after a routine sequence of pit stops. Matevos Isaakyan had an anxious moment with a rear suspension failure on the No. 17 SMP car at the entrance to the second part of the double-left hand in the Porsche Curves. The car speared backwards into a tyre barrier to the outside of the track and sustained damage. Isaakyan could not get the car moving and contacted his team for advice on how it could be made mobile. Marshals pushed the car behind a barrier and repairs were made to its rear. Isaakyan retired after an engine bay fire. The retirement of the SMP vehicle elevated the Rebellion cars of Laurent and the recovering Lotterer to third and fourth and Vergne's LMP2-leading G-Drive car to fifth overall. Porsche's control on the first three positions in LMGTE Pro was broken after Tandy's No. 93 car was forced into the garage with an electrical problem. Early in the tenth hour, the No. 8 Toyota of Buemi incurred a one-minute stop-and-go penalty for speeding in a slow zone, dropping the car two minutes, ten seconds behind Conway's No. 7 car. Philipp Eng's No. 81 BMW relinquished its hold on third place in LMGTE Pro due to a broken damper losing him 11 minutes in the garage.

As the race approached its midway point, Alonso lowered the deficit to Lopez's race-leading No. 7 Toyota to 1 minute and 16 seconds and Roman Rusinov's G-Drive car led by one lap over Lapierre in LMP2. Christensen in the No. 92 Porsche was 1 minute, 53 seconds ahead of his teammate Bruni in LMGTE Pro and Andlauer's No. 77 Dempsey-Proton held sway over Bleekemolen's Keating Ferrari in LMGTE Am. During the 13th hour, Menezes drove the No. 3 Rebellion car to the garage for a nine-minute repair to its underfloor. He ceded third place to Jani's No. 1 car. José Gutiérrez crashed the No. 40 G-Drive car at the exit to the Porsche Curves and ricocheted onto the circuit facing oncoming traffic. Gutiérrez was unhurt; the damage to the car caused its retirement and a local slow zone was enforced. The slow zone increased López's lead over Alonso to two minutes. Soon after Jani came to the pit lane to repair his car's underbody and emerged after a nine-minute pit stop in fourth place, behind his teammate Menezes. Fisichella brought the Spirit of Race Ferrari into third in LMGTE Am drivers and drew closer to Bleekemolen in second.

=== Morning to early afternoon ===
In the early morning Kobayashi led his teammate Nakajima by around ten to twelve seconds. Nakajima eliminated the time deficit to retake the lead from Kobayashi at the Mulsanne corner and a series of fast lap times put Buemi ahead by more than half a minute. BMW lost one of their two LMGTE Pro entries when Alexander Sims slid on oil laid on the track in the Porsche Curves and damaged the rear of the No. 82 car in a collision against a barrier. At the conclusion of the 16th hour, Cairoli was in fifth in LMGTE Am when he lost control of the No. 88 Dempsey-Proton Porsche car due to a suspension failure and crashed into a tyre barrier at the Ford Chicane. The car was retired due to the heavy damage sustained to it and a slow zone was enforced in the area. Both of the Toyota cars were observed speeding in the area and incurred separate one-minute stop-and-go penalties; their multi-lap lead over the Rebellion team kept them in first and second positions. Further down the order, the No. 10 DragonSpeed BR1 had an accident when Hanley lost control of the car in the Porsche Curves and retired. Fifth place in the LMGTE Pro became a battle between the No. 63 Corvette of Mike Rockenfeller and Dixon's No. 69 Ford with the two exchanging position before Dixon claimed it.

Several LMGTE cars took the opportunity to change brake discs at this point in the morning to ensure that cars would finish the race, including the leading car in LMGTE Pro, the No. 92 Porsche. Antonio García drove the No. 63 Corvette car past Ryan Briscoe's No. 69 Ford and gradually drew closer to the No. 68 Ford. Traffic loosened a drain cover built into a kerb at the outside of the Tertre Rouge corner and its metal casting was launched onto a verge. It required the deployment of the safety cars to allow workers to refit the grill and make it safe to drive over. As the safety cars were recalled after half an hour, Alonso fell behind Conway until he overtook him for the lead in slower traffic on the Mulsanne Straight. The LMGTE Pro field closed up with Bruni's No. 92 Porsche car and Müller's No. 68 car close by for second place in class. Not long after Paul di Resta lost control of the No. 23 United Autosports Ligier in the Porsche Curves and the car's front-left corner struck an unprotected concrete barrier. The car slid onto the grass and stopped. Di Resta vacated the car unhurt and was transported to the medical centre for a precautionary check-up as the car was retired. The accident required the intervention of a fourth safety car period. When racing resumed the Dempsey-Proton team's lead in LMGTE Am was lowered to less than half a minute and Makowiecki fell behind Bourdais and Priaulx to fourth place in LMGTE Pro. The No. 39 Graff vehicle of Vincent Capillaire overtook François Perrodo's TDS car for fourth in LMP2.

The No. 23 Panis Barthez Ligier car of Will Stevens, which had held second place in the LMP2 category, entered the pit lane to undergo repairs to its clutch and promoted the Signatech Alpine team to the position. López lost control of the No. 7 Toyota at the exit to the Dunlop Curve and lost 16 seconds to the race-leader Alonso. The IDEC car forfeited second place in LMP2 to Capillaire due to a cracked gearbox casing forcing its retirement, as Makowiecki and Bourdais exchanged second in LMGTE Pro; Makowiecki avoided punishment from the stewards for defensive driving preventing Bourdais from overtaking him. Ben Keating, whose No. 85 Keating Ferrari was second in LMGTE Am, lost control of the rear of the car under braking and was beached in a gravel trap at Mulsanne corner. The car relinquished its hold on second place to the Spirit of Race team and fell one lap behind the class leading No. 77 Dempsey-Proton car. Kobayashi, in second and within 80 minutes of the finish, missed the entry to the pit lane and Toyota required him to slow to 80 km/h (50 mph) by engaging the full course yellow flag limiter to conserve fuel. The No. 7 car lost one lap to the No. 8 entry; it incurred two ten-second stop-and-go penalties for exceeding the number of laps permitted for a single stint by a LMP1 hybrid car and fuel allowance.

=== Finish ===
Unhindered in the final hours of the race, Nakajima achieved victory for the No. 8 Toyota team, which completed 388 laps and was two laps ahead of Kobayashi's No. 7 Toyota. Rebellion, unable to match the pace of the Toyota cars, finished third and fourth with the No. 3 R13 ahead of the No. 1 car. It was Alonso, Buemi and Nakajima's first Le Mans victory, and Toyota's first on its 20th try. Toyota became the first Japanese manufacturer to win at Le Mans since Mazda in 1991 and Alonso completed a second leg of the Triple Crown of Motorsport (the 24 Hours of Le Mans, the Indianapolis 500 and the Monaco Grand Prix). The G-Drive team led the final 360 laps with the No. 26 Oreca to be the first car to finish the race in LMP2, provisionally earning the team and its drivers Andrea Pizzitola, Rusinov and Vergne their first class victories. Signatech Alpine were the highest-placed full-season WEC team in second and the Graff Racing squad completed the class podium. On its 70th anniversary Porsche took its first win in the LMGTE Pro category since 2013 with the No. 92 car ahead of the No. 91 entry, and the German marque won in LMGTE Am with the No. 77 Dempsey-Proton car of Christian Ried winning by 1 minute, 39 seconds over the No. 54 Spirit of Race Ferrari of Fisichella. There were 25 lead changes amongst two cars during the race. The No. 7 Toyota's 205 laps led was the most of any car with the race-winning No. 8 leading 13 times for a total of 183 laps.

== Post-race ==
Obviously it has been a long time dream for me to be there and to experience Le Mans. It's great to have the first opportunity and be in a competitive team as Toyota, to dominate free practice, qualifying and the race. It was a competition between the two of our cars in the garage. In the end we got a little bit more lucky and a little bit more better set up.

— Fernando Alonso talking about his maiden experience at the 24 Hours of Le Mans

The top three teams in each of the four classes appeared on the podium to collect their trophies and spoke to the media in a later press conference. Alonso said he was worried about his car having a mechanical issue preventing him from winning the race, "Right now I'm maybe still in a little bit [of] shock because we were so focused on the race and so stressed at the end watching the television. I'm not used to watching my car racing, I'm normally in it." Nakajima said he believed Toyota was calmer than in previous years, "To win this race has been a dream of Toyota's since 1985, and there are so many guys still here that have been involved in the project so long, I'm so proud to be here to represent them." Buemi said the one-minute stop-and-go penalty he took made his team uncertain whether they would win, "All the preparation that goes behind that day, all of us, all six drivers, we've been driving for many days, in the nights, and finally when you win it, it's something really big."

After all of the non-hybrid cars were unable to challenge the Toyota team, Jani called the race "a procession" and said the Rebellion R13 car lost more than ten seconds per lap to the TS050 Hybrid, "Our spread between our quickest lap and our average is huge, their spread is a lot smaller because they can be flexible with how they overtake cars in a straight line." Lotterer reiterated his teammate's view and said he believed the FIA and the ACO would address the issue, "We didn't stand a chance. Let's face it, it was one of the boring editions of the Le Mans 24 Hours. I have to admit that it was difficult to get the most out of every lap. How do you stay motivated?" Oliver Webb agreed with Lotterer and said he felt the following 6 Hours of Silverstone would suit the car's high-downforce configuration. Frank-Steffen Walliser, the head of Porsche Motorsport, said he felt comments from Bourdais over a perceived view that Makowiecki had inadequate driving standards during a battle for second in LMGTE Pro were invalid, "Firstly, this is not a pony farm; secondly, in my view, it was hard but fair at all times. The scenes when Fred himself was pushed into the grass were not shown on TV. Apart from that – what do you expect when two Frenchmen fight for second place in the biggest French race? Is that supposed to be peace, joy, pancakes? I don't think so!"

During post-race scrutineering, the technical delegates discovered that the LMP2-winning No. 26 G-Drive and the No. 28 TDS cars had modified refuelling rigs in their fuel system assemblies extending to the dead man valve and inside the cone of the fuel restrictor to lessen the time spent in the pit lane, causing the stewards to disqualify the cars. Both teams filed an appeal to the penalties with the FIA International Court of Appeal. The tribunal met on 18 September and delayed giving a verdict because the judges on the panel wanted extra time to review the appeal and informed the team's lawyers of this. On 2 October, the tribunal heard the G-Drive and TDS team's appeal. G-Drive argued the modified component was a "commendable technical innovation" with no specific regulation about modifications between the fuel flow restristrictor and the dead man's valve established. The court upheld the stewards' decision by deeming the introduction of an additional component protruding the fuel flow restrictor a regulation transgression. The Signatech Alpine team took the win in LMP2, the No. 39 Graff car was second and the No. 32 United Autosports vehicle completed the class podium in third.

The result increased Alonso, Buemi and Nakajima's lead in the LMP Drivers' Championship to 20 points over their teammates Conway, Kobayashi and López in second. Beche, Laurent and Menezes remained in third place. Lapierre, André Negrão and Thiriet's victory in LMP2 moved them from seventh to fourth and Jani, Lotterer and Senna were fifth. Christensen and Estre took the lead of the GTE Drivers Championship from Johnson, Mücke and Pla. Bruni and Lietz were in third position. Toyota increased their lead over the Rebellion squad in the LMP1 Teams' Championship to 27 points. The ByKolles and SMP Racing teams retained third and fourth. Porsche moved further away from Ford by 44 points in the GTE Manufacturers' Championship and Ferrari maintained third place with six races remaining in the season.

== Official results ==
The minimum number of laps for classification (70 per cent of the overall winning car's race distance) was 272 laps. Class winners are in bold.

Final race classification
Pos	Class	No	Team	Drivers	Chassis	Tyre	Laps	Time
Pos	Class	No	Team	Drivers	Engine	Tyre	Laps	Time
1	**LMP1**	**8**	**(Japan) Toyota Gazoo Racing**	**(Switzerland) Sébastien Buemi (Japan) Kazuki Nakajima (Spain) Fernando Alonso**	**Toyota TS050 Hybrid**	M	**388**	**24:00.52.247**
1	**LMP1**	**8**	**(Japan) Toyota Gazoo Racing**	**(Switzerland) Sébastien Buemi (Japan) Kazuki Nakajima (Spain) Fernando Alonso**	**Toyota 2.4 L Turbo V6**	M	**388**	**24:00.52.247**
2	LMP1	7	(Japan) Toyota Gazoo Racing	(United Kingdom) Mike Conway (Japan) Kamui Kobayashi (Argentina) José María López	Toyota TS050 Hybrid	M	386	+2 Laps
2	LMP1	7	(Japan) Toyota Gazoo Racing	(United Kingdom) Mike Conway (Japan) Kamui Kobayashi (Argentina) José María López	Toyota 2.4 L Turbo V6	M	386	+2 Laps
3	LMP1	3	(Switzerland) Rebellion Racing	(France) Thomas Laurent (United States) Gustavo Menezes (Switzerland) Mathias Beche	Rebellion R13	M	376	+12 Laps
3	LMP1	3	(Switzerland) Rebellion Racing	(France) Thomas Laurent (United States) Gustavo Menezes (Switzerland) Mathias Beche	Gibson GL458 4.5 L V8	M	376	+12 Laps
4	LMP1	1	(Switzerland) Rebellion Racing	(Brazil) Bruno Senna (Germany) André Lotterer (Switzerland) Neel Jani	Rebellion R13	M	375	+13 Laps
4	LMP1	1	(Switzerland) Rebellion Racing	(Brazil) Bruno Senna (Germany) André Lotterer (Switzerland) Neel Jani	Gibson GL458 4.5 L V8	M	375	+13 Laps
5	**LMP2**	**36**	**(France) Signatech Alpine Matmut**	**(France) Nicolas Lapierre (France) Pierre Thiriet (Brazil) André Negrão**	**Alpine A470**	D	**367**	**+21 Laps**
5	**LMP2**	**36**	**(France) Signatech Alpine Matmut**	**(France) Nicolas Lapierre (France) Pierre Thiriet (Brazil) André Negrão**	**Gibson GK428 4.2 L V8**	D	**367**	**+21 Laps**
6	LMP2	39	(France) Graff-SO24	(France) Vincent Capillaire (Switzerland) Jonathan Hirschi (France) Tristan Gommendy	Oreca 07	D	366	+22 Laps
6	LMP2	39	(France) Graff-SO24	(France) Vincent Capillaire (Switzerland) Jonathan Hirschi (France) Tristan Gommendy	Gibson GK428 4.2 L V8	D	366	+22 Laps
7	LMP2	32	(United States) United Autosports	(Switzerland) Hugo de Sadeleer (United States) Will Owen (Colombia) Juan Pablo Montoya	Ligier JS P217	D	365	+23 Laps
7	LMP2	32	(United States) United Autosports	(Switzerland) Hugo de Sadeleer (United States) Will Owen (Colombia) Juan Pablo Montoya	Gibson GK428 4.2 L V8	D	365	+23 Laps
8	LMP2	37	(China) Jackie Chan DC Racing	(Malaysia) Jazeman Jaafar (Malaysia) Weiron Tan (Malaysia) Nabil Jeffri	Oreca 07	D	361	+27 Laps
8	LMP2	37	(China) Jackie Chan DC Racing	(Malaysia) Jazeman Jaafar (Malaysia) Weiron Tan (Malaysia) Nabil Jeffri	Gibson GK428 4.2 L V8	D	361	+27 Laps
9	LMP2	31	(United States) DragonSpeed	(Mexico) Roberto González (Venezuela) Pastor Maldonado (France) Nathanaël Berthon	Oreca 07	M	360	+28 Laps
9	LMP2	31	(United States) DragonSpeed	(Mexico) Roberto González (Venezuela) Pastor Maldonado (France) Nathanaël Berthon	Gibson GK428 4.2 L V8	M	360	+28 Laps
10	LMP2	38	(China) Jackie Chan DC Racing	(Netherlands) Ho-Pin Tung (France) Gabriel Aubry (Monaco) Stéphane Richelmi	Oreca 07	D	356	+32 Laps
10	LMP2	38	(China) Jackie Chan DC Racing	(Netherlands) Ho-Pin Tung (France) Gabriel Aubry (Monaco) Stéphane Richelmi	Gibson GK428 4.2 L V8	D	356	+32 Laps
11	LMP2	29	(Netherlands) Racing Team Nederland	(Netherlands) Giedo van der Garde (Netherlands) Jan Lammers (Netherlands) Frits van Eerd	Dallara P217	M	356	+32 Laps
11	LMP2	29	(Netherlands) Racing Team Nederland	(Netherlands) Giedo van der Garde (Netherlands) Jan Lammers (Netherlands) Frits van Eerd	Gibson GK428 4.2 L V8	M	356	+32 Laps
12	LMP2	33	(China) Jackie Chan DC Racing	(China) David Cheng (United States) Nick Boulle (France) Pierre Nicolet	Ligier JS P217	D	355	+33 Laps
12	LMP2	33	(China) Jackie Chan DC Racing	(China) David Cheng (United States) Nick Boulle (France) Pierre Nicolet	Gibson GK428 4.2 L V8	D	355	+33 Laps
13	LMP2	23	(France) Panis Barthez Competition	(France) Julien Canal (France) Timothé Buret (United Kingdom) Will Stevens	Ligier JS P217	M	352	+36 Laps
13	LMP2	23	(France) Panis Barthez Competition	(France) Julien Canal (France) Timothé Buret (United Kingdom) Will Stevens	Gibson GK428 4.2 L V8	M	352	+36 Laps
14	LMP2	35	(Russia) SMP Racing	(Russia) Viktor Shaytar (United Kingdom) Harrison Newey (France) Norman Nato	Dallara P217	D	345	+43 Laps
14	LMP2	35	(Russia) SMP Racing	(Russia) Viktor Shaytar (United Kingdom) Harrison Newey (France) Norman Nato	Gibson GK428 4.2 L V8	D	345	+43 Laps
15	**LMGTE; Pro**	**92**	**(Germany) Porsche GT Team**	**(Denmark) Michael Christensen (France) Kévin Estre (Belgium) Laurens Vanthoor**	**Porsche 911 RSR**	M	**344**	**+44 Laps**
15	**LMGTE; Pro**	**92**	**(Germany) Porsche GT Team**	**(Denmark) Michael Christensen (France) Kévin Estre (Belgium) Laurens Vanthoor**	**Porsche 4.0 L Flat-6**	M	**344**	**+44 Laps**
16	LMGTE; Pro	91	(Germany) Porsche GT Team	(Austria) Richard Lietz (Italy) Gianmaria Bruni (France) Frédéric Makowiecki	Porsche 911 RSR	M	343	+45 Laps
16	LMGTE; Pro	91	(Germany) Porsche GT Team	(Austria) Richard Lietz (Italy) Gianmaria Bruni (France) Frédéric Makowiecki	Porsche 4.0 L Flat-6	M	343	+45 Laps
17	LMGTE; Pro	68	(United States) Ford Chip Ganassi Team USA	(United States) Joey Hand (Germany) Dirk Müller (France) Sébastien Bourdais	Ford GT	M	343	+45 Laps
17	LMGTE; Pro	68	(United States) Ford Chip Ganassi Team USA	(United States) Joey Hand (Germany) Dirk Müller (France) Sébastien Bourdais	Ford EcoBoost 3.5 L Turbo V6	M	343	+45 Laps
18	LMGTE; Pro	63	(United States) Corvette Racing – GM	(Denmark) Jan Magnussen (Spain) Antonio García (Germany) Mike Rockenfeller	Chevrolet Corvette C7.R	M	342	+46 Laps
18	LMGTE; Pro	63	(United States) Corvette Racing – GM	(Denmark) Jan Magnussen (Spain) Antonio García (Germany) Mike Rockenfeller	Chevrolet LT5.5 5.5 L V8	M	342	+46 Laps
19	LMP2	47	(Italy) Cetilar Villorba Corse	(Italy) Roberto Lacorte (Italy) Giorgio Sernagiotto (Brazil) Felipe Nasr	Dallara P217	D	342	+46 Laps
19	LMP2	47	(Italy) Cetilar Villorba Corse	(Italy) Roberto Lacorte (Italy) Giorgio Sernagiotto (Brazil) Felipe Nasr	Gibson GK428 4.2 L V8	D	342	+46 Laps
20	LMGTE; Pro	52	(Italy) AF Corse	(Finland) Toni Vilander (Brazil) Pipo Derani (Italy) Antonio Giovinazzi	Ferrari 488 GTE Evo	M	341	+47 Laps
20	LMGTE; Pro	52	(Italy) AF Corse	(Finland) Toni Vilander (Brazil) Pipo Derani (Italy) Antonio Giovinazzi	Ferrari F154CB 3.9 L Turbo V8	M	341	+47 Laps
21	LMGTE; Pro	66	(United States) Ford Chip Ganassi Team UK	(Germany) Stefan Mücke (France) Olivier Pla (United States) Billy Johnson	Ford GT	M	340	+48 Laps
21	LMGTE; Pro	66	(United States) Ford Chip Ganassi Team UK	(Germany) Stefan Mücke (France) Olivier Pla (United States) Billy Johnson	Ford EcoBoost 3.5 L Turbo V6	M	340	+48 Laps
22	LMGTE; Pro	51	(Italy) AF Corse	(United Kingdom) James Calado (Italy) Alessandro Pier Guidi (Brazil) Daniel Serra	Ferrari 488 GTE Evo	M	339	+49 Laps
22	LMGTE; Pro	51	(Italy) AF Corse	(United Kingdom) James Calado (Italy) Alessandro Pier Guidi (Brazil) Daniel Serra	Ferrari F154CB 3.9 L Turbo V8	M	339	+49 Laps
23	LMGTE; Pro	95	(United Kingdom) Aston Martin Racing	(Denmark) Nicki Thiim (Denmark) Marco Sørensen (United Kingdom) Darren Turner	Aston Martin Vantage AMR	M	339	+49 Laps
23	LMGTE; Pro	95	(United Kingdom) Aston Martin Racing	(Denmark) Nicki Thiim (Denmark) Marco Sørensen (United Kingdom) Darren Turner	Aston Martin M177 4.0 L Turbo V8	M	339	+49 Laps
24	LMGTE; Pro	71	(Italy) AF Corse	(Italy) Davide Rigon (United Kingdom) Sam Bird (Spain) Miguel Molina	Ferrari 488 GTE Evo	M	338	+50 Laps
24	LMGTE; Pro	71	(Italy) AF Corse	(Italy) Davide Rigon (United Kingdom) Sam Bird (Spain) Miguel Molina	Ferrari F154CB 3.9 L Turbo V8	M	338	+50 Laps
25	**LMGTE; Am**	**77**	**(Germany) Dempsey-Proton Racing**	**(Australia) Matt Campbell (Germany) Christian Ried (France) Julien Andlauer**	**Porsche 911 RSR**	M	**335**	**+53 Laps**
25	**LMGTE; Am**	**77**	**(Germany) Dempsey-Proton Racing**	**(Australia) Matt Campbell (Germany) Christian Ried (France) Julien Andlauer**	**Porsche 4.0 L Flat-6**	M	**335**	**+53 Laps**
26	LMGTE; Am	54	(Switzerland) Spirit of Race	(Switzerland) Thomas Flohr (Italy) Francesco Castellacci (Italy) Giancarlo Fisichella	Ferrari 488 GTE	M	335	+53 Laps
26	LMGTE; Am	54	(Switzerland) Spirit of Race	(Switzerland) Thomas Flohr (Italy) Francesco Castellacci (Italy) Giancarlo Fisichella	Ferrari F154CB 3.9 L Turbo V8	M	335	+53 Laps
27	LMGTE; Pro	93	(United States) Porsche GT Team	(France) Patrick Pilet (United Kingdom) Nick Tandy (New Zealand) Earl Bamber	Porsche 911 RSR	M	334	+54 Laps
27	LMGTE; Pro	93	(United States) Porsche GT Team	(France) Patrick Pilet (United Kingdom) Nick Tandy (New Zealand) Earl Bamber	Porsche 4.0 L Flat-6	M	334	+54 Laps
28	LMGTE; Am	85	(United States) Keating Motorsports	(United States) Ben Keating (Netherlands) Jeroen Bleekemolen (Germany) Luca Stolz	Ferrari 488 GTE	M	334	+54 Laps
28	LMGTE; Am	85	(United States) Keating Motorsports	(United States) Ben Keating (Netherlands) Jeroen Bleekemolen (Germany) Luca Stolz	Ferrari F154CB 3.9 L Turbo V8	M	334	+54 Laps
29	LMGTE; Am	99	(Germany) Proton Competition	(United States) Patrick Long (United States) Tim Pappas (United States) Spencer Pumpelly	Porsche 911 RSR	M	334	+54 Laps
29	LMGTE; Am	99	(Germany) Proton Competition	(United States) Patrick Long (United States) Tim Pappas (United States) Spencer Pumpelly	Porsche 4.0 L Flat-6	M	334	+54 Laps
30	LMGTE; Am	84	(United Kingdom) JMW Motorsport	(United Kingdom) Liam Griffin (United States) Cooper MacNeil (United States) Jeff Segal	Ferrari 488 GTE	M	332	+56 Laps
30	LMGTE; Am	84	(United Kingdom) JMW Motorsport	(United Kingdom) Liam Griffin (United States) Cooper MacNeil (United States) Jeff Segal	Ferrari F154CB 3.9 L Turbo V8	M	332	+56 Laps
31	LMGTE; Am	80	(Italy) Ebimotors	(Italy) Fabio Babini (Denmark) Christina Nielsen (France) Erik Maris	Porsche 911 RSR	M	332	+56 Laps
31	LMGTE; Am	80	(Italy) Ebimotors	(Italy) Fabio Babini (Denmark) Christina Nielsen (France) Erik Maris	Porsche 4.0 L Flat-6	M	332	+56 Laps
32	LMP2	50	(France) Larbre Compétition	(France) Erwin Creed (France) Romano Ricci (France) Thomas Dagoneau	Ligier JS P217	M	332	+56 Laps
32	LMP2	50	(France) Larbre Compétition	(France) Erwin Creed (France) Romano Ricci (France) Thomas Dagoneau	Gibson GK428 4.2 L V8	M	332	+56 Laps
33	LMGTE; Pro	81	(Germany) BMW Team MTEK	(Netherlands) Nicky Catsburg (Germany) Martin Tomczyk (Austria) Philipp Eng	BMW M8 GTE	M	332	+56 Laps
33	LMGTE; Pro	81	(Germany) BMW Team MTEK	(Netherlands) Nicky Catsburg (Germany) Martin Tomczyk (Austria) Philipp Eng	BMW S63 4.0 L Turbo V8	M	332	+56 Laps
34	LMGTE; Am	56	(Germany) Team Project 1	(Germany) Jörg Bergmeister (United States) Patrick Lindsey (Norway) Egidio Perfetti	Porsche 911 RSR	M	332	+56 Laps
34	LMGTE; Am	56	(Germany) Team Project 1	(Germany) Jörg Bergmeister (United States) Patrick Lindsey (Norway) Egidio Perfetti	Porsche 4.0 L Flat-6	M	332	+56 Laps
35	LMGTE; Am	61	(Singapore) Clearwater Racing	(Republic of Ireland) Matt Griffin (Malaysia) Weng Sun Mok (Japan) Keita Sawa	Ferrari 488 GTE	M	332	+56 Laps
35	LMGTE; Am	61	(Singapore) Clearwater Racing	(Republic of Ireland) Matt Griffin (Malaysia) Weng Sun Mok (Japan) Keita Sawa	Ferrari F154CB 3.9 L Turbo V8	M	332	+56 Laps
36	LMGTE; Pro	67	(United States) Ford Chip Ganassi Team UK	(United Kingdom) Harry Tincknell (United Kingdom) Andy Priaulx (Brazil) Tony Kanaan	Ford GT	M	332 (Note: The No. 67 Ford was penalised 11 laps and 1:23.499 by the stewards following the race for Tony Kanaan failing to meet the minimum overall drive time of six hours.)	+56 Laps
36	LMGTE; Pro	67	(United States) Ford Chip Ganassi Team UK	(United Kingdom) Harry Tincknell (United Kingdom) Andy Priaulx (Brazil) Tony Kanaan	Ford EcoBoost 3.5 L Turbo V6	M	332	+56 Laps
37	LMGTE; Pro	97	(United Kingdom) Aston Martin Racing	(United Kingdom) Alex Lynn (United Kingdom) Jonathan Adam (Belgium) Maxime Martin	Aston Martin Vantage AMR	M	327	+61 Laps
37	LMGTE; Pro	97	(United Kingdom) Aston Martin Racing	(United Kingdom) Alex Lynn (United Kingdom) Jonathan Adam (Belgium) Maxime Martin	Aston Martin M177 4.0 L Turbo V8	M	327	+61 Laps
38	LMGTE; Am	70	(Japan) MR Racing	(Monaco) Olivier Beretta (Italy) Eddie Cheever III (Japan) Motoaki Ishikawa	Ferrari 488 GTE	M	324	+64 Laps
38	LMGTE; Am	70	(Japan) MR Racing	(Monaco) Olivier Beretta (Italy) Eddie Cheever III (Japan) Motoaki Ishikawa	Ferrari F154CB 3.9 L Turbo V8	M	324	+64 Laps
39	LMGTE; Pro	69	(United States) Ford Chip Ganassi Team USA	(Australia) Ryan Briscoe (United Kingdom) Richard Westbrook (New Zealand) Scott Dixon	Ford GT	M	309 (Note: The No. 69 Ford was penalised 2 laps and 1:42.968 by the stewards following the race for Scott Dixon failing to meet the minimum overall drive time of six hours.)	+79 Laps
39	LMGTE; Pro	69	(United States) Ford Chip Ganassi Team USA	(Australia) Ryan Briscoe (United Kingdom) Richard Westbrook (New Zealand) Scott Dixon	Ford EcoBoost 3.5 L Turbo V6	M	309	+79 Laps
40	LMGTE; Am	86	(United Kingdom) Gulf Racing	(United Kingdom) Michael Wainwright (United Kingdom) Ben Barker (Australia) Alex Davison	Porsche 911 RSR	M	283	+105 Laps
40	LMGTE; Am	86	(United Kingdom) Gulf Racing	(United Kingdom) Michael Wainwright (United Kingdom) Ben Barker (Australia) Alex Davison	Porsche 4.0 L Flat-6	M	283	+105 Laps
41	LMP1	5	(China) CEFC TRSM Racing	(United Kingdom) Charlie Robertson (United Kingdom) Michael Simpson (France) Léo Roussel	Ginetta G60-LT-P1	M	283 (Note: The No. 5 Ginetta was penalised 6 laps and 2:45.613 by the stewards following the race for Léo Roussel failing to meet the minimum overall drive time of six hours.)	+105 Laps
41	LMP1	5	(China) CEFC TRSM Racing	(United Kingdom) Charlie Robertson (United Kingdom) Michael Simpson (France) Léo Roussel	Mecachrome V634P1 3.4 L Turbo V6	M	283	+105 Laps
NC	LMP2	44	(Philippines) Eurasia Motorsport	(Italy) Andrea Bertolini (Sweden) Niclas Jönsson (United States) Tracy Krohn	Ligier JS P217	D	334	Incomplete final lap
NC	LMP2	44	(Philippines) Eurasia Motorsport	(Italy) Andrea Bertolini (Sweden) Niclas Jönsson (United States) Tracy Krohn	Gibson GK428 4.2 L V8	D	334	Incomplete final lap
DNF	LMP1	11	(Russia) SMP Racing	(Russia) Mikhail Aleshin (Russia) Vitaly Petrov (United Kingdom) Jenson Button	BR Engineering BR1	M	315	Engine
DNF	LMP1	11	(Russia) SMP Racing	(Russia) Mikhail Aleshin (Russia) Vitaly Petrov (United Kingdom) Jenson Button	AER P60B 2.4 L Turbo V6	M	315	Engine
DNF	LMP2	48	(France) IDEC Sport	(France) Paul Lafargue (France) Paul-Loup Chatin (Mexico) Memo Rojas	Oreca 07	M	312	Gearbox
DNF	LMP2	48	(France) IDEC Sport	(France) Paul Lafargue (France) Paul-Loup Chatin (Mexico) Memo Rojas	Gibson GK428 4.2 L V8	M	312	Gearbox
DNF	LMGTE; Am	90	(United Kingdom) TF Sport	(United Kingdom) Euan Hankey (Republic of Ireland) Charlie Eastwood (Turkey) Salih Yoluç	Aston Martin V8 Vantage GTE	M	304	Driveshaft
DNF	LMGTE; Am	90	(United Kingdom) TF Sport	(United Kingdom) Euan Hankey (Republic of Ireland) Charlie Eastwood (Turkey) Salih Yoluç	Aston Martin AJ37 4.5 L V8	M	304	Driveshaft
DNF	LMP2	22	(United States) United Autosports	(United Kingdom) Phil Hanson (United Kingdom) Paul di Resta (Portugal) Filipe Albuquerque	Ligier JS P217	D	288	Crash
DNF	LMP2	22	(United States) United Autosports	(United Kingdom) Phil Hanson (United Kingdom) Paul di Resta (Portugal) Filipe Albuquerque	Gibson GK428 4.2 L V8	D	288	Crash
DNF	LMGTE; Pro	64	(United States) Corvette Racing – GM	(United Kingdom) Oliver Gavin (United States) Tommy Milner (Switzerland) Marcel Fässler	Chevrolet Corvette C7.R	M	259	Overheating
DNF	LMGTE; Pro	64	(United States) Corvette Racing – GM	(United Kingdom) Oliver Gavin (United States) Tommy Milner (Switzerland) Marcel Fässler	Chevrolet LT5.5 5.5 L V8	M	259	Overheating
DNF	LMP1	10	(United States) DragonSpeed	(United Kingdom) Ben Hanley (Sweden) Henrik Hedman (Netherlands) Renger van der Zande	BR Engineering BR1	M	244	Crash
DNF	LMP1	10	(United States) DragonSpeed	(United Kingdom) Ben Hanley (Sweden) Henrik Hedman (Netherlands) Renger van der Zande	Gibson GL458 4.5 L V8	M	244	Crash
DNF	LMP2	25	(Portugal) Algarve Pro Racing	(United States) Mark Patterson (Netherlands) Ate de Jong (South Korea) Tacksung Kim	Ligier JS P217	D	237	Gearbox
DNF	LMP2	25	(Portugal) Algarve Pro Racing	(United States) Mark Patterson (Netherlands) Ate de Jong (South Korea) Tacksung Kim	Gibson GK428 4.2 L V8	D	237	Gearbox
DNF	LMGTE; Am	88	(Germany) Dempsey-Proton Racing	(United Arab Emirates) Khaled Al Qubaisi (Italy) Matteo Cairoli (Italy) Giorgio Roda	Porsche 911 RSR	M	225	Suspension
DNF	LMGTE; Am	88	(Germany) Dempsey-Proton Racing	(United Arab Emirates) Khaled Al Qubaisi (Italy) Matteo Cairoli (Italy) Giorgio Roda	Porsche 4.0 L Flat-6	M	225	Suspension
DNF	LMGTE; Pro	82	(Germany) BMW Team MTEK	(Portugal) António Félix da Costa (United Kingdom) Alexander Sims (Brazil) Augusto Farfus	BMW M8 GTE	M	223	Damage
DNF	LMGTE; Pro	82	(Germany) BMW Team MTEK	(Portugal) António Félix da Costa (United Kingdom) Alexander Sims (Brazil) Augusto Farfus	BMW S63 4.0 L Turbo V8	M	223	Damage
DNF	LMP2	40	(Russia) G-Drive Racing	(Australia) James Allen (Mexico) José Gutierrez (France) Enzo Guibbert	Oreca 07	D	197	Crash
DNF	LMP2	40	(Russia) G-Drive Racing	(Australia) James Allen (Mexico) José Gutierrez (France) Enzo Guibbert	Gibson GK428 4.2 L V8	D	197	Crash
DNF	LMP2	34	(China) Jackie Chan DC Racing	(United States) Ricky Taylor (France) Côme Ledogar (Denmark) David Heinemeier Hansson	Ligier JS P217	D	195	Engine
DNF	LMP2	34	(China) Jackie Chan DC Racing	(United States) Ricky Taylor (France) Côme Ledogar (Denmark) David Heinemeier Hansson	Gibson GK428 4.2 L V8	D	195	Engine
DNF	LMP1	6	(China) CEFC TRSM Racing	(United Kingdom) Oliver Rowland (United Kingdom) Alex Brundle (United Kingdom) Oliver Turvey	Ginetta G60-LT-P1	M	137	Electrical
DNF	LMP1	6	(China) CEFC TRSM Racing	(United Kingdom) Oliver Rowland (United Kingdom) Alex Brundle (United Kingdom) Oliver Turvey	Mecachrome V634P1 3.4 L Turbo V6	M	137	Electrical
DNF	LMP1	17	(Russia) SMP Racing	(France) Stéphane Sarrazin (Russia) Matevos Isaakyan (Russia) Egor Orudzhev	BR Engineering BR1	M	123	Crash
DNF	LMP1	17	(Russia) SMP Racing	(France) Stéphane Sarrazin (Russia) Matevos Isaakyan (Russia) Egor Orudzhev	AER P60B 2.4 L Turbo V6	M	123	Crash
DNF	LMGTE; Pro	94	(United States) Porsche GT Team	(France) Romain Dumas (Germany) Timo Bernhard (Germany) Sven Müller	Porsche 911 RSR	M	92	Suspension
DNF	LMGTE; Pro	94	(United States) Porsche GT Team	(France) Romain Dumas (Germany) Timo Bernhard (Germany) Sven Müller	Porsche 4.0 L Flat-6	M	92	Suspension
DNF	LMGTE; Am	98	(United Kingdom) Aston Martin Racing	(Canada) Paul Dalla Lana (Austria) Mathias Lauda (Portugal) Pedro Lamy	Aston Martin V8 Vantage GTE	M	92	Crash
DNF	LMGTE; Am	98	(United Kingdom) Aston Martin Racing	(Canada) Paul Dalla Lana (Austria) Mathias Lauda (Portugal) Pedro Lamy	Aston Martin AJ37 4.5 L V8	M	92	Crash
DNF	LMP1	4	(Austria) ByKolles Racing Team	(United Kingdom) Oliver Webb (France) Tom Dillmann (Austria) Dominik Kraihamer	ENSO CLM P1/01	M	65	Collision
DNF	LMP1	4	(Austria) ByKolles Racing Team	(United Kingdom) Oliver Webb (France) Tom Dillmann (Austria) Dominik Kraihamer	Nismo VRX30A 3.0 L Turbo V6	M	65	Collision
DSQ	LMP2	26	(Russia) G-Drive Racing	(Russia) Roman Rusinov (France) Andrea Pizzitola (France) Jean-Éric Vergne	Oreca 07	D	369	Disqualified (Note: The No. 26 G-Drive and No. 28 TDS Orecas, both under the operation of TDS Racing, were disqualified from the race after the team was found to have illegally modified their refueling equipment in order to fuel both cars faster than regulations allowed.)
DSQ	LMP2	26	(Russia) G-Drive Racing	(Russia) Roman Rusinov (France) Andrea Pizzitola (France) Jean-Éric Vergne	Gibson GK428 4.2 L V8	D	369	Disqualified
DSQ	LMP2	28	(France) TDS Racing	(France) François Perrodo (France) Loïc Duval (France) Matthieu Vaxivière	Oreca 07	D	365 (Note: Prior to the disqualification, the No. 28 TDS Oreca was penalised 1 lap and 1:18.188 by the stewards following the race for François Perrodo exceeding the maximum drive time of four hours within a six-hour period.)	Disqualified
DSQ	LMP2	28	(France) TDS Racing	(France) François Perrodo (France) Loïc Duval (France) Matthieu Vaxivière	Gibson GK428 4.2 L V8	D	365	Disqualified

Tyre manufacturers
Key
Symbol	Tyre manufacturer
**D**	Dunlop
**M**	Michelin

== Championship standings after the race ==
2018–2019 LMP World Endurance Drivers' Championship
Pos.	+/–	Driver	Points
1		(Spain) Fernando Alonso (Japan) Kazuki Nakajima (Switzerland) Sébastien Buemi	65
2		(Japan) Kamui Kobayashi (United Kingdom) Mike Conway (Argentina) José María López	45
3		(France) Thomas Laurent (United States) Gustavo Menezes (Switzerland) Mathias Beche	38
4	3	(France) Nicolas Lapierre (Brazil) André Negrão (France) Pierre Thiriet	21
5	8	(Switzerland) Neel Jani (Germany) André Lotterer (Brazil) Bruno Senna	18

2018–2019 LMP1 World Endurance Championship
Pos.	+/–	Team	Points
1		(Japan) Toyota Gazoo Racing	65
2		(Switzerland) Rebellion Racing	38
3		(Austria) ByKolles Racing Team	12
4		(Russia) SMP Racing	10
5		(China) CEFC TRSM Racing	1
6		(United States) DragonSpeed	0

- Note: Only the top five positions are included for Drivers' Championship standings.

2018–2019 World Endurance GTE Drivers' Championship
Pos.	+/–	Driver	Points
1	1	(Denmark) Michael Christensen (France) Kévin Estre	56
2	1	(United States) Billy Johnson (France) Olivier Pla (Germany) Stefan Mücke	48
3	1	(Italy) Gianmaria Bruni (Austria) Richard Lietz	40
4		(Belgium) Laurens Vanthoor	38
5		(France) Frédéric Makowiecki	28

2018–2019 World Endurance GTE Manufacturers' Championship
Pos.	+/–	Constructor	Points
1		(Germany) Porsche	96
2		(United States) Ford	50
3		(Italy) Ferrari	45.5
4	1	(United Kingdom) Aston Martin	30
5	1	(Germany) BMW	17

- Note: Only the top five positions are included for the Drivers' Championship standings.

FIA World Endurance Championship
Previous race: 6 Hours of Spa-Francorchamps	2018–19 season	Next race: 6 Hours of Silverstone
