= 2006 Beijing A1GP round =

2006-07 A1GP of Beijing, China

Race Details
- Race 3 of 11 in the 2006-07 A1 Grand Prix season
- Date: November 12, 2006
- Location: Beijing International Streetcircuit; Beijing, China
- Weather: Clear, 12°C

Qualifying
- Pole: The Netherlands (Jeroen Bleekemolen)
- Time: 1:00.093 (no pole time1, no pole time2)

Sprint Race
- 1st: The Netherlands (Jeroen Bleekemolen)
- 2nd: Mexico (Salvador Durán)
- 3rd: Italy (Enrico Toccacelo)

Main Race
- 1st: Italy (Enrico Toccacelo)
- 2nd: Great Britain (Oliver Jarvis)
- 3rd: Australia (Karl Reindler)

Fast Lap
- FL: Canada (James Hinchcliffe)
- Time: 58.107, (Lap 39 of Feature Race)

Official Classifications

The 2006-07 A1 Grand Prix of Nations, Beijing, China was an A1 Grand Prix race, held on November 12, 2006 at Beijing International Streetcircuit, Beijing, China. It was the third race in the 2006-07 A1 Grand Prix season and the first and the only meeting held at the circuit.

Due to various safety concerns, the circuit was shortened, and the races started behind the safety car, with the Sprint Race was run mostly behind the safety car. These incidents led to questions about the management and organization of both the event and A1GP in general, eventually leading to series' collapse in 2009. Following the incident and the track's lack of funding, the first Chinese race of the season was moved to Zhuhai International Circuit for the 2007-08 season.

== Report ==
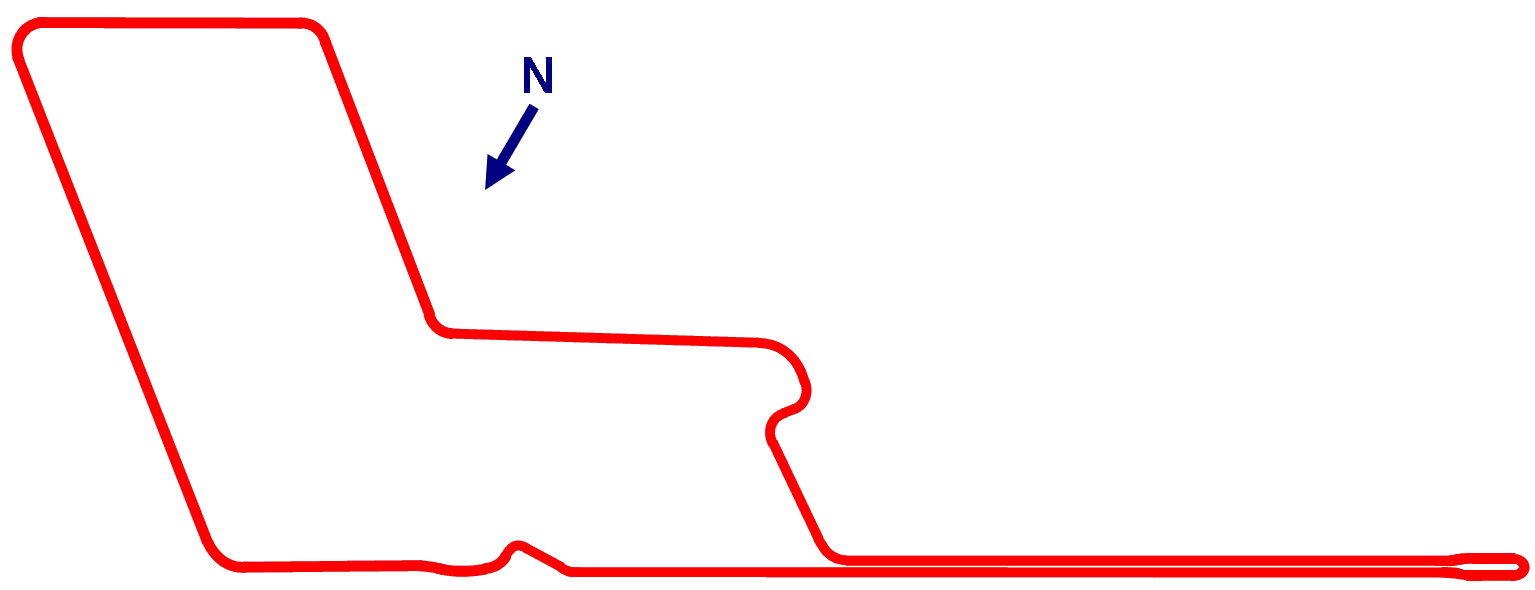
Layout of the Beijing International Streetcircuit

=== Practice ===
The first day of practice was canceled because of safety concerns, as the hairpin at the end of the backstraight was too tight for the cars to negotiate safely due to a 180 degree left turn – resulting in cars were running wide and stopping mid-corner. A revised track layout was devised for an extended Saturday practice session, creating a wider hairpin halfway up the straight, bypassing most of the old straight.

=== Qualifying ===
More problems arose in qualifying, when manhole covers on the roads were coming undone due to the racing cars' high downforce and low center of gravity. Grid positions were decided based on practice times, resulting in A1 Team Netherlands driver Jeroen Bleekemolen taking pole position for the Sprint race. Some advertising banners also came loose around the circuit.

=== Races ===
Both races started behind the safety car as the first corner was deemed unsafe.

More than half the race was held under the safety car, as South Africa's Adrian Zaugg spun and stalled his car and blocked half of the track. Bleekemolen won the race for the Netherlands, with Salvador Durán of Mexico and A1 Team Italy's Enrico Toccacelo in second and third.

Toccacelo won the feature race, with Britain's Oliver Jarvis second and Australia's Karl Reindler a surprise third after James Hinchcliffe crashed out on the final lap. The feature race was shortened from 67 laps to 63 due to time constraints.

== Results ==
=== Qualification ===
Qualification was cancelled due to track problems. Accordingly, the grid was set from the times set in the 25 minutes of the morning practice session (Practice 3) before it was red-flagged, under article 144 of the Sporting Regulations.

Pos	Team	Driver	Laps	Quickest Time	Gap
1	Netherlands	Jeroen Bleekemolen	16	1:00.093	--
2	Mexico	Salvador Durán	11	1:00.583	+ 0.490
3	Italy	Enrico Toccacelo	14	1:00.942	+ 0.849
4	Canada	James Hinchcliffe	11	1:01.103	+ 1.010
5	Germany	Nico Hülkenberg	11	1:01.275	+ 1.182
6	Brazil	Raphael Matos	18	1:01.306	+ 1.213
7	South Africa	Adrian Zaugg	11	1:01.361	+ 1.268
8	(United Kingdom) Great Britain	Oliver Jarvis	19	1:01.404	+ 1.311
9	Czech Republic	Tomáš Enge	21	1:01.555	+ 1.462
10	Switzerland	Neel Jani	11	1:01.711	+ 1.618
11	(Republic of Ireland) Ireland	Michael Devaney	12	1:02.810	+ 2.717
12	New Zealand	Matt Halliday	11	1:02.852	+ 2.759
13	(United States) USA	Philip Giebler	11	1:02.916	+ 2.823
14	Australia	Karl Reindler	10	1:02.999	+ 2.906
15	China	Congfu Cheng	16	1:03.275	+ 3.182
16	Malaysia	Alex Yoong	8	1:04.246	+ 4.153
17	Singapore	Christian Murchison	6	1:05.897	+ 5.804
18	Indonesia	Ananda Mikola	9	1:06.038	+ 5.945
19	India	Armaan Ebrahim	14	1:06.056	+ 5.963
20	Lebanon	Basil Shaaban	14	1:06.389	+ 6.296
21	France	Nicolas Lapierre	3	1:09.662	+ 9.569
22	Pakistan	Nur B. Ali	13	1:10.263	+ 10.170

=== Sprint Race results ===
The Sprint Race took place on Sunday, November 12, 2006.

Pos	Team	Driver	Laps	Time	Points
1	Netherlands	Jeroen Bleekemolen	15	20'28.420	6
2	Mexico	Salvador Durán	15	+ 1.464	5
3	Italy	Enrico Toccacelo	15	+ 2.311	4
4	Canada	James Hinchcliffe	15	+ 3.375	3
5	Germany	Nico Hülkenberg	15	+ 3.943	2
6	Brazil	Raphael Matos	15	+ 4.400	1
7	(United Kingdom) Great Britain	Oliver Jarvis	15	+ 7.377	
8	Czech Republic	Tomáš Enge	15	+ 8.397	
9	Switzerland	Neel Jani	15	+ 8.849	
10	New Zealand	Matt Halliday	15	+ 9.265	
11	(United States) USA	Philip Giebler	15	+ 10.422	
12	Australia	Karl Reindler	15	+ 11.920	
13	China	Congfu Cheng	15	+ 13.216	
14	Malaysia	Alex Yoong	15	+ 17.027	
15	Indonesia	Ananda Mikola	15	+ 18.479	
16	Singapore	Christian Murchison	15	+ 20.659	
17	France	Nicolas Lapierre	15	+ 20.802	
18	India	Armaan Ebrahim	15	+ 22.253	
19	Lebanon	Basil Shaaban	15	+ 22.783	
20	(Republic of Ireland) Ireland	Michael Devaney	15	+ 23.247	
21	Pakistan	Nur B. Ali	15	+ 47.541	
DNF	South Africa	Adrian Zaugg	2	+ 13 laps	

=== Feature Race results ===
The Feature Race took place on Sunday, November 12, 2006. The race was initially scheduled for 67 laps, but was shortened by five laps.

Pos	Team	Driver	Laps	Time	Points
1	Italy	Enrico Toccacelo	63	1.10.15.919	10
2	(United Kingdom) Great Britain	Oliver Jarvis	63	+ 4.508	9
3	Australia	Karl Reindler	63	+ 5.917	8
4	France	Nicolas Lapierre	63	+ 12.900	7
5	South Africa	Adrian Zaugg	63	+ 13.278	6
6	Czech Republic	Tomáš Enge	63	+ 13.684	5
7	Brazil	Raphael Matos	63	+ 14.839	4
8	Singapore	Christian Murchison	63	+ 16.486	3
9	New Zealand	Matt Halliday	63	+ 17.005	2
10	Canada	James Hinchcliffe	62	+ 1 Lap	1
11	India	Armaan Ebrahim	62	+ 1 Lap	
12	Malaysia	Alex Yoong	61	+ 2 Laps	
13	Lebanon	Basil Shaaban	61	+ 2 Laps	
DNF	Netherlands	Jeroen Bleekemolen	53	+ 10 Laps	
DNF	Germany	Nico Hülkenberg	53	+ 10 Laps	
DNF	Indonesia	Ananda Mikola	36	+ 27 Laps	
DNF	China	Congfu Cheng	28	+ 35 Laps	
DNF	(United States) USA	Philip Giebler	21	+ 42 Laps	
DNF	Switzerland	Neel Jani	20	+ 43 Laps	
DNF	Mexico	Salvador Durán	14	+ 49 Laps	
DNF	(Republic of Ireland) Ireland	Michael Devaney	3	+ 60 Laps	
DNF	Pakistan	Nur B. Ali	1	+ 62 Laps	

== Similar problems in China ==
Similar problems have occurred before in China. The 2004 DTM race around the streets of Pudong in Shanghai was hampered by crashes due to manhole covers becoming undone; the 2005 Chinese Grand Prix on the Shanghai International Circuit was interrupted when the safety car had to be deployed when a water runoff drain became open. The same problem also occurred in the Australian V8 Supercars race on the same circuit a few months before.
