= Jingkai Street Circuit =

Former street circuit

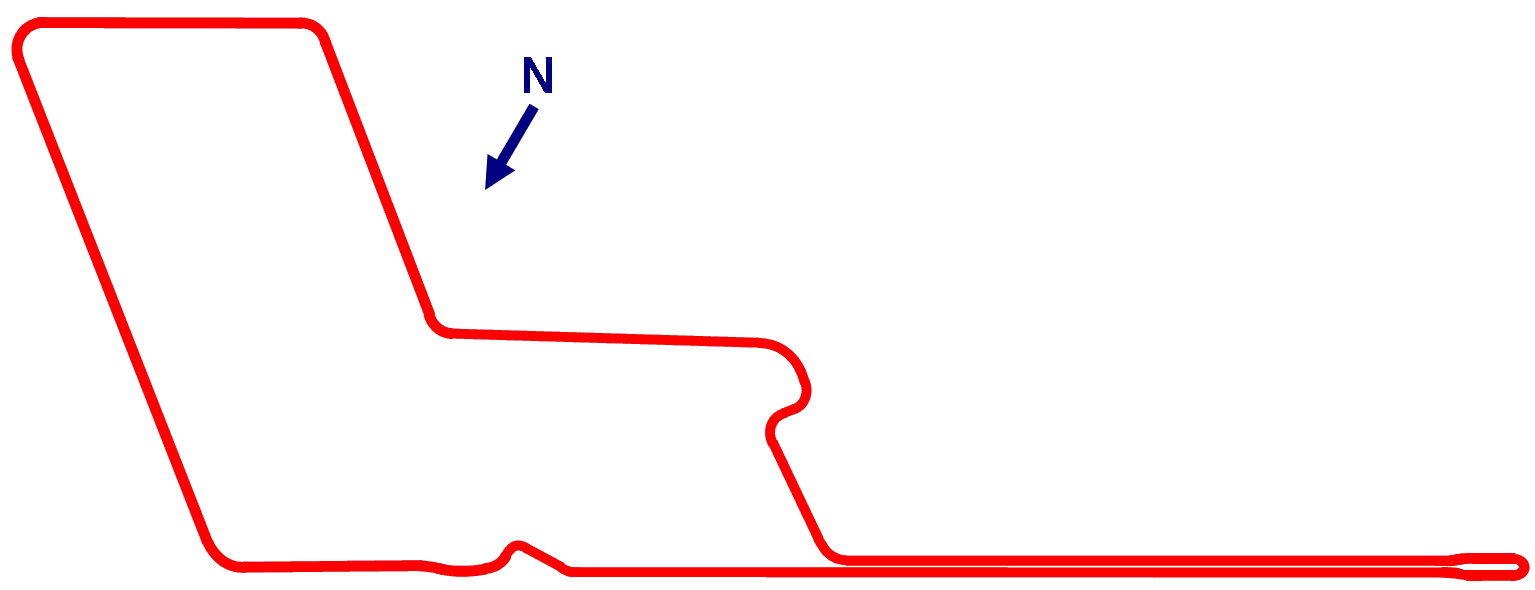
- Planned circuit layout
- Location: Yizhuang, Beijing, China
- Coordinates: 39°48′30.40″N 116°29′52.96″E
- Opened: 10 November 2006; 19 years ago
- Closed: March 2007; 19 years ago
- Architect: Hermann Tilke
- Major events: A1 GP (2006)

A1 Grand Prix Circuit (2006)
- Length: 2.231 km (1.386 mi)
- Turns: 11
- Race lap record: 0:58.107 (136.3 km/h) ( (Canada) James Hinchcliffe, Lola A1GP, 2006, A1GP)

The Jingkai Street Circuit, also known as the Beijing International Street Circuit, was a street circuit in Yizhuang, a suburb 16 km (10 mi) to the south-east of central Beijing, China. It was first used on the weekend of 10–12 November 2006 for the third round of the A1GP. China became the only country to host two events in the 2006–07 A1 Grand Prix series.

It was announced in the Shanghai Daily on March 23, 2007 that, due to lack of funding, no further A1 Grand Prix races were scheduled to be held in Beijing. The report suggested that preparing the street circuit for the race cost about 20 million yuan ($2.6 million).

== Safety issues ==
The FIA expressed safety concerns about the dual carriageway on this track before the event, so it was feared that it could have led to a "last minute" cancellation decision. However, clearance was given on the morning of November 10 for the use of the circuit for racing purposes. The tight hairpin at the end of the dual carriageway and also the backstraight was a 180 degree left turn. Later during the event, the turn was found to be far too tight for the race cars. They tried to negotiate safely by running wide but were still stopping at the mid corner, therefore the sessions were red flagged.

During qualifying, manhole covers on the roads were coming undone due to the racing cars' high downforce and low ride height. Some advertising banners also came loose around the circuit. It was announced the races would start behind the safety car, as the first corner was also deemed unsafe.

== Circuit layout changes ==
As a result of safety issues and difficulties experienced during the first practice session for the inaugural race at the circuit—the A1GP cars found it difficult to negotiate the tight 180-degree Turn 8 hairpin—the circuit was revised overnight prior to practice on November 11, 2006. The straight leading up to Turn 8 was shortened and the turn was made less tight. The shorter circuit, down from 3.048 to 2.231 km (1.894 to 1.386 mi), was created and creating another less tight hairpin halfway up the straight, bypassing most of the old straight. However, this corner was still not ideal as drivers ran wide despite the corner being wider, and had to avoid the pitlane entry barrier.
