= 2025–26 Asian Le Mans Series =

Sports car racing series

The 2025–26 Asian Le Mans Series was the fourteenth season of the Automobile Club de l'Ouest's Asian Le Mans Series. It is the fourth 24 Hours of Le Mans-based series created by the ACO, following the American Le Mans Series (since merged with the Rolex Sports Car Series to form the IMSA SportsCar Championship), the European Le Mans Series and the FIA World Endurance Championship. The six-event season began at the Sepang International Circuit in Sepang on 12 December 2025 and concluded at the Yas Marina Circuit in Abu Dhabi on 8 February 2026. This season marked the debut of the new, third-generation LMP3 cars in this series. This also as well marked the last season in the Asian Le Mans Series for the LMP3 class since being in the category in the 2015-16 season due to being removed and placed into the newly created Asian Le Mans Cup for the next year's season 2026-27 Asian Le Mans Cup as a support category.

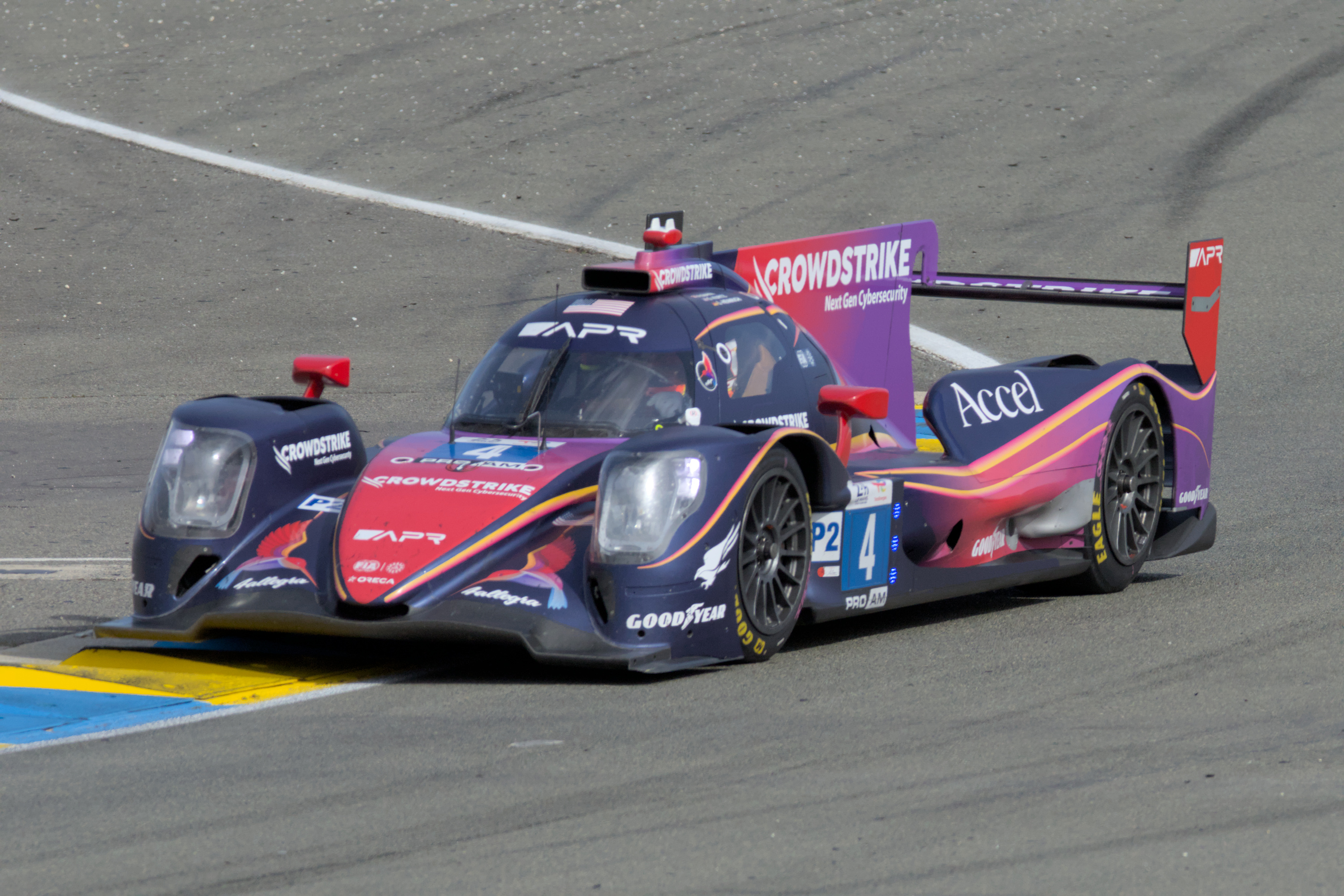
The No. 4 CrowdStrike Racing by APR (pictured in the 2026 24 Hours of Le Mans) won the LMP2 Drivers' and Teams' championship titles

== Calendar ==
The calendar for the 2025–26 season was announced on the official website 19 March 2025. The first two races were held at the Sepang International Circuit in December 2025, before moving to United Arab Emirates at the Dubai Autodrome in Dubai and Yas Marina Circuit in Abu Dhabi in February 2026.

The season comprised six four-hour length races, run on the three circuits.

Rnd	Race	Circuit	Location	Date	Supporting Events	Map of circuit locations
1	4 Hours of Sepang	(Malaysia) Sepang International Circuit	Sepang, Selangor, Malaysia	13 December 2025	None	2025–26 Asian Le Mans Series is located in Asia
2	4 Hours of Sepang	(Malaysia) Sepang International Circuit	Sepang, Selangor, Malaysia	14 December 2025	None	2025–26 Asian Le Mans Series is located in Asia
3	4 Hours of Dubai	(United Arab Emirates) Dubai Autodrome	Dubailand, Dubai, UAE	31 January 2026	Formula Regional Middle East Trophy; UAE4 Series	2025–26 Asian Le Mans Series is located in Asia
4	4 Hours of Dubai	(United Arab Emirates) Dubai Autodrome	Dubailand, Dubai, UAE	1 February 2026	Formula Regional Middle East Trophy; UAE4 Series	2025–26 Asian Le Mans Series is located in Asia
5	4 Hours of Abu Dhabi	(United Arab Emirates) Yas Marina Circuit	Yas Island, Abu Dhabi, UAE	7 February 2026	Gulf ProCar Championship; Gulf Radical Cup	2025–26 Asian Le Mans Series is located in Asia
6	4 Hours of Abu Dhabi	(United Arab Emirates) Yas Marina Circuit	Yas Island, Abu Dhabi, UAE	8 February 2026	Gulf ProCar Championship; Gulf Radical Cup	2025–26 Asian Le Mans Series is located in Asia

== Entry list ==
=== LMP2 ===
All cars in the LMP2 class use the Gibson GK428 V8 engine and Michelin tyres.

Entrant/Team	Car	No.	Drivers	Rounds
(Luxembourg) DKR Engineering	Oreca 07	3	(Switzerland) Mathias Beche	All
(Luxembourg) DKR Engineering	Oreca 07	3	(Germany) Alexander Mattschull	All
(Luxembourg) DKR Engineering	Oreca 07	3	(Australia) Griffin Peebles	All
(United States) CrowdStrike Racing by APR	Oreca 07	4	(Switzerland) Louis Delétraz	All
(United States) CrowdStrike Racing by APR	Oreca 07	4	(Denmark) Malthe Jakobsen	All
(United States) CrowdStrike Racing by APR	Oreca 07	4	(United States) George Kurtz	All
(Portugal) Algarve Pro Racing	Oreca 07	20	(United States) John Falb	All
(Portugal) Algarve Pro Racing	Oreca 07	20	(Liechtenstein) Matthias Kaiser	All
(Portugal) Algarve Pro Racing	Oreca 07	20	(France) Sami Meguetounif	All
(Portugal) Algarve Pro Racing	Oreca 07	25	(France) Tom Dillmann	All
(Portugal) Algarve Pro Racing	Oreca 07	25	(Denmark) Michael Jensen	All
(Portugal) Algarve Pro Racing	Oreca 07	25	(Italy) Enzo Trulli	All
(United Kingdom) United Autosports	Oreca 07	5	(Denmark) Mikkel Jensen	All
(United Kingdom) United Autosports	Oreca 07	5	(Italy) Giorgio Roda	All
(United Kingdom) United Autosports	Oreca 07	5	(Switzerland) Grégoire Saucy	All
(United Kingdom) United Autosports	Oreca 07	6	(United Kingdom) Paul di Resta	All
(United Kingdom) United Autosports	Oreca 07	6	(Canada) Phil Fayer	All
(United Kingdom) United Autosports	Oreca 07	6	(United Kingdom) Ben Hanley	All
(Japan) PONOS Racing (Note: The No. 45 PONOS Racing entry was run by K2 R&D at rounds 1–2 and United Autosports at rounds 3–6.)	Oreca 07	45	(Japan) Kei Cozzolino	All
(Japan) PONOS Racing	Oreca 07	45	(Japan) Marino Sato	All
(Japan) PONOS Racing	Oreca 07	45	(Japan) Yorikatsu Tsujiko	All
(Germany) Proton Competition	Oreca 07	22	(Germany) Felipe Fernández Laser	All
(Germany) Proton Competition	Oreca 07	22	(Germany) Jonas Ried	All
(Germany) Proton Competition	Oreca 07	22	(Portugal) Bernardo Sousa	1–2
(Germany) Proton Competition	Oreca 07	22	(Germany) Stefan Aust	3–6
(Germany) Proton Competition	Oreca 07	88	(Austria) Horst Felbermayr Jr.	All
(Germany) Proton Competition	Oreca 07	88	(Austria) Horst Felix Felbermayr	All
(Germany) Proton Competition	Oreca 07	88	(Spain) Lorenzo Fluxá	All
(France) RD Limited	Oreca 07	30	(Australia) James Allen	All
(France) RD Limited	Oreca 07	30	(France) Tristan Vautier	All
(France) RD Limited	Oreca 07	30	(United States) Fred Poordad	1–3, 5–6
(France) RD Limited	Oreca 07	30	(United Kingdom) James Sweetnam	3–4 (Note: Fred Poordad withdrew from round 3 shortly before qualifying after suffering back pain. Locally-based bronze James Sweetnam was drafted in at the last minute.)
(Poland) Inter Europol Competition	Oreca 07	43	(Greece) Georgios Kolovos	All
(Poland) Inter Europol Competition	Oreca 07	43	(United States) Nolan Siegel	All
(Poland) Inter Europol Competition	Oreca 07	43	(New Zealand) Nick Cassidy	1–2
(Poland) Inter Europol Competition	Oreca 07	43	(United States) Bijoy Garg	3–6
(Slovakia) ARC Bratislava	Oreca 07	44	(France) Yann Ehrlacher	All
(Slovakia) ARC Bratislava	Oreca 07	44	(Slovakia) Miro Konôpka	All
(Slovakia) ARC Bratislava	Oreca 07	44	(France) Matthieu Vaxivière	All
(Italy) Cetilar Racing	Oreca 07	47	(Italy) Antonio Fuoco	All
(Italy) Cetilar Racing	Oreca 07	47	(Italy) Roberto Lacorte	All
(Italy) Cetilar Racing	Oreca 07	47	(France) Charles Milesi	All
(Denmark) High Class Racing	Oreca 07	49	(Denmark) Theodor Jensen	All
(Denmark) High Class Racing	Oreca 07	49	(United States) Gustavo Menezes	All
(Denmark) High Class Racing	Oreca 07	49	(Denmark) Jens Reno Møller	All
(United Kingdom) Nielsen Racing	Oreca 07	64	(Turkey) Cem Bölükbaşı	All
(United Kingdom) Nielsen Racing	Oreca 07	64	(Greece) Kriton Lendoudis	All
(United Kingdom) Nielsen Racing	Oreca 07	64	(United Kingdom) Alex Quinn	All
(United Kingdom) Vector Sport RLR	Oreca 07	70	(United States) Jacob Abel	All
(United Kingdom) Vector Sport RLR	Oreca 07	70	(Grenada) Vladislav Lomko (Note: Stolyarov and Salikhov are Russian, but they compete as Armenian licenses as Russian national emblems were banned by the FIA following the Russian invasion of Ukraine. Lomko, Bukhantsov, Mukovoz and Nesov, also Russians, compete under Grenadian, Kittitian, Emirati and Slovene licences respectively for the same reason.)	All
(United Kingdom) Vector Sport RLR	Oreca 07	70	(Brazil) Daniel Schneider	All

- Naveen Rao was scheduled to compete for Nielsen Racing, but was replaced by Kriton Lendoudis prior to the start of the season. The seat Lendoudis vacated at Algarve Pro Racing was filled by John Falb, and the seat Falb vacated at Vector Sport RLR was in turn filled by Daniel Schneider.

=== LMP3 ===
All cars in the LMP3 class use the Toyota V35A-FTS 3.5 L twin-turbo V6 engine and Michelin tyres.

Entrant/Team	Car	No.	Drivers	Rounds
(Poland) Team Virage	Ligier JS P325	1	(Algeria) Julien Gerbi	All
(Poland) Team Virage	Ligier JS P325	1	(India) Narain Karthikeyan	All
(Poland) Team Virage	Ligier JS P325	1	(India) Ajith Kumar	All
(Poland) Team Virage	Ligier JS P325	8	(India) Aditya Patel	All
(Poland) Team Virage	Ligier JS P325	8	(Belgium) Vic Stevens	All
(Poland) Team Virage	Ligier JS P325	8	(France) Romain Vozniak	All
(Poland) Inter Europol Competition	Ligier JS P325	13	(Saint Kitts and Nevis) Alexander Bukhantsov	All
(Poland) Inter Europol Competition	Ligier JS P325	13	(Chinese Taipei) Chun-Ting Chou	All
(Poland) Inter Europol Competition	Ligier JS P325	13	(Colombia) Henry Cubides Olarte	All
(Switzerland) CLX Motorsport	Ligier JS P325	17	(United States) Alexander Jacoby	All
(Switzerland) CLX Motorsport	Ligier JS P325	17	(France) Paul Lanchère	All
(Switzerland) CLX Motorsport	Ligier JS P325	17	(Switzerland) Kévin Rabin	All
(France) 23Events Racing	Ligier JS P325	23	(United Kingdom) Isaac Barashi	All
(France) 23Events Racing	Ligier JS P325	23	(Italy) Matteo Quintarelli	All
(France) 23Events Racing	Ligier JS P325	23	(France) Louis Stern	All
(France) 23Events Racing	Ligier JS P325	71	(Egypt) Ibrahim Badawy	All
(France) 23Events Racing	Ligier JS P325	71	(Slovakia) Matúš Ryba	All
(France) 23Events Racing	Ligier JS P325	71	(United Kingdom) Terrence Woodward	All
(Czech Republic) Bretton Racing	Ligier JS P325	26	(Poland) Jacek Zielonka	All
(Czech Republic) Bretton Racing	Ligier JS P325	26	(Spain) Lucas Fluxá	1–4
(Czech Republic) Bretton Racing	Ligier JS P325	26	(Germany) Lenny Ried	1–4
(Czech Republic) Bretton Racing	Ligier JS P325	26	(United Kingdom) Haydn Chance	5–6
(Czech Republic) Bretton Racing	Ligier JS P325	26	(United Kingdom) Theo Micouris	5–6
(France) Forestier Racing by VPS	Ligier JS P325	29	(United Kingdom) Nick Adcock	All
(France) Forestier Racing by VPS	Ligier JS P325	29	(Brazil) Lucas Fecury	All
(France) Forestier Racing by VPS	Ligier JS P325	29	(France) Luciano Morano	All
(France) R-ace GP	Duqueine D09	85	(France) Fabien Michal	1–2, 5–6
(France) R-ace GP	Duqueine D09	85	(Luxembourg) Pierre-Alexandre Provost	1–2, 5–6
(France) R-ace GP	Duqueine D09	85	(Germany) Hugo Schwarze	1–2
(France) R-ace GP	Duqueine D09	85	(Switzerland) Léna Bühler	3–4
(France) R-ace GP	Duqueine D09	85	(Singapore) Danial Frost	3–4
(France) R-ace GP	Duqueine D09	85	(Lebanon) Shahan Sarkissian	3–4
(France) R-ace GP	Duqueine D09	85	(New Zealand) Zack Scoular	5–6
(Denmark) High Class Racing	Ligier JS P325	94	(Denmark) Philip Lindberg	All
(Denmark) High Class Racing	Ligier JS P325	94	(United Kingdom) Callum Voisin	All
(Denmark) High Class Racing	Ligier JS P325	94	(United Kingdom) Tim Whale	All

- Danny Buntschu and Yohann Segala were scheduled to compete for Team Virage, but did not appear at any rounds.
- Douwe Dedecker was scheduled to compete for Inter Europol Competition, but he was replaced prior to the start of the season.
- Dan Skočdopole was scheduled to compete for his Bretton Racing team, but withdrew prior to the start of the season.
- Anders Fjordbach was scheduled to compete for High Class Racing, but he was replaced prior to the start of the season.

=== GT ===
Entrant/Team	Car	Engine	No.	Drivers	Rounds
(Germany) GetSpeed Performance	Mercedes-AMG GT3 Evo	Mercedes-AMG M159 6.2 L V8	9	(United States) Anthony Bartone	All
(Germany) GetSpeed Performance	Mercedes-AMG GT3 Evo	Mercedes-AMG M159 6.2 L V8	9	(Germany) Fabian Schiller	All
(Germany) GetSpeed Performance	Mercedes-AMG GT3 Evo	Mercedes-AMG M159 6.2 L V8	9	(Japan) Shigekazu Wakisaka	1–2
(Germany) GetSpeed Performance	Mercedes-AMG GT3 Evo	Mercedes-AMG M159 6.2 L V8	9	(Luxembourg) Steve Jans	3–6
(Qatar) QMMF by GetSpeed	Mercedes-AMG GT3 Evo	Mercedes-AMG M159 6.2 L V8	37	(Qatar) Abdulla Al-Khelaifi	All
(Qatar) QMMF by GetSpeed	Mercedes-AMG GT3 Evo	Mercedes-AMG M159 6.2 L V8	37	(Austria) Lucas Auer	All
(Qatar) QMMF by GetSpeed	Mercedes-AMG GT3 Evo	Mercedes-AMG M159 6.2 L V8	37	(Qatar) Ghanim Al-Maadheed	All
(Germany) Manthey Racing	Porsche 911 GT3 R (992)	Porsche M97/80 4.2 L Flat-6	10	(Hong Kong) Antares Au	All
(Germany) Manthey Racing	Porsche 911 GT3 R (992)	Porsche M97/80 4.2 L Flat-6	10	(Austria) Klaus Bachler	All
(Germany) Manthey Racing	Porsche 911 GT3 R (992)	Porsche M97/80 4.2 L Flat-6	10	(Netherlands) Loek Hartog	All
(Germany) Manthey Racing	Porsche 911 GT3 R (992)	Porsche M97/80 4.2 L Flat-6	92	(France) François Hériau	All
(Germany) Manthey Racing	Porsche 911 GT3 R (992)	Porsche M97/80 4.2 L Flat-6	92	(Austria) Richard Lietz	All
(Germany) Manthey Racing	Porsche 911 GT3 R (992)	Porsche M97/80 4.2 L Flat-6	92	(Italy) Riccardo Pera	All
(United Kingdom) TF Sport	Chevrolet Corvette Z06 GT3.R	Chevrolet LT6.R 5.5 L V8	11	(United Kingdom) Matt Bell	All
(United Kingdom) TF Sport	Chevrolet Corvette Z06 GT3.R	Chevrolet LT6.R 5.5 L V8	11	(United States) Blake McDonald	All
(United Kingdom) TF Sport	Chevrolet Corvette Z06 GT3.R	Chevrolet LT6.R 5.5 L V8	11	(Republic of Ireland) James Roe	All
Racing Team Turkey	Chevrolet Corvette Z06 GT3.R	Chevrolet LT6.R 5.5 L V8	34	(Republic of Ireland) Charlie Eastwood	All
Racing Team Turkey	Chevrolet Corvette Z06 GT3.R	Chevrolet LT6.R 5.5 L V8	34	(Belgium) Tom Van Rompuy	All
Racing Team Turkey	Chevrolet Corvette Z06 GT3.R	Chevrolet LT6.R 5.5 L V8	34	(Turkey) Salih Yoluç	All
(Switzerland) Kessel Racing	Ferrari 296 GT3	Ferrari F163CE 3.0 L Turbo V6	15	(Italy) Alessandro Balzan	All
(Switzerland) Kessel Racing	Ferrari 296 GT3	Ferrari F163CE 3.0 L Turbo V6	15	(United States) Memo Gidley	All
(Switzerland) Kessel Racing	Ferrari 296 GT3	Ferrari F163CE 3.0 L Turbo V6	15	(United States) Dylan Medler	All
(Switzerland) Kessel Racing	Ferrari 296 GT3	Ferrari F163CE 3.0 L Turbo V6	74	(United States) Dustin Blattner	All
(Switzerland) Kessel Racing	Ferrari 296 GT3	Ferrari F163CE 3.0 L Turbo V6	74	(United Kingdom) Chris Lulham	All
(Switzerland) Kessel Racing	Ferrari 296 GT3	Ferrari F163CE 3.0 L Turbo V6	74	(Germany) Dennis Marschall	All
(Italy) AF Corse	Ferrari 296 GT3	Ferrari F163CE 3.0 L Turbo V6	21	(United Kingdom) Darren Leung	All
(Italy) AF Corse	Ferrari 296 GT3	Ferrari F163CE 3.0 L Turbo V6	21	(United States) Simon Mann	All
(Italy) AF Corse	Ferrari 296 GT3	Ferrari F163CE 3.0 L Turbo V6	21	(Italy) Alessio Rovera	All
(Italy) AF Corse	Ferrari 296 GT3	Ferrari F163CE 3.0 L Turbo V6	51	(Indonesia) Sean Gelael	All
(Italy) AF Corse	Ferrari 296 GT3	Ferrari F163CE 3.0 L Turbo V6	51	(Italy) Davide Rigon	All
(Italy) AF Corse	Ferrari 296 GT3	Ferrari F163CE 3.0 L Turbo V6	51	(France) Charles-Henri Samani	All
(Thailand) Amerasian Fragrance by AF Racing	Ferrari 296 GT3	Ferrari F163CE 3.0 L Turbo V6	50	(Thailand) Carl Bennett	All
(Thailand) Amerasian Fragrance by AF Racing	Ferrari 296 GT3	Ferrari F163CE 3.0 L Turbo V6	50	(United States) Gregory Bennett	All
(Thailand) Amerasian Fragrance by AF Racing	Ferrari 296 GT3	Ferrari F163CE 3.0 L Turbo V6	50	(Italy) Tommaso Mosca	All
(Italy) Vista AF Corse	Ferrari 296 GT3	Ferrari F163CE 3.0 L Turbo V6	54	(Italy) Francesco Castellacci	All
(Italy) Vista AF Corse	Ferrari 296 GT3	Ferrari F163CE 3.0 L Turbo V6	54	(Switzerland) Thomas Flohr	1–2
(Italy) Vista AF Corse	Ferrari 296 GT3	Ferrari F163CE 3.0 L Turbo V6	54	(Italy) Alessandro Pier Guidi	1–2
(Italy) Vista AF Corse	Ferrari 296 GT3	Ferrari F163CE 3.0 L Turbo V6	54	(Netherlands) Yelmer Buurman	3–4
(Italy) Vista AF Corse	Ferrari 296 GT3	Ferrari F163CE 3.0 L Turbo V6	54	(Netherlands) Nigel Schoonderwoerd	3–4
(Italy) Vista AF Corse	Ferrari 296 GT3	Ferrari F163CE 3.0 L Turbo V6	54	(Italy) Riccardo Agostini	5–6
(Italy) Vista AF Corse	Ferrari 296 GT3	Ferrari F163CE 3.0 L Turbo V6	54	(Brazil) Custodio Toledo	5–6
(Belgium) UNX Racing by Team WRT	BMW M4 GT3 Evo	BMW S58B30T0 3.0 L Turbo I6	28	(Belgium) Mathieu Detry	1–2
(Belgium) UNX Racing by Team WRT	BMW M4 GT3 Evo	BMW S58B30T0 3.0 L Turbo I6	28	(Belgium) Fabian Duffieux	1–2
(Belgium) UNX Racing by Team WRT	BMW M4 GT3 Evo	BMW S58B30T0 3.0 L Turbo I6	28	(Brazil) Augusto Farfus	1–2
(Belgium) Team WRT	BMW M4 GT3 Evo	BMW S58B30T0 3.0 L Turbo I6	28	(Brazil) Augusto Farfus	3–6
(Belgium) Team WRT	BMW M4 GT3 Evo	BMW S58B30T0 3.0 L Turbo I6	28	(Italy) Gabriele Piana	3–6
(Belgium) Team WRT	BMW M4 GT3 Evo	BMW S58B30T0 3.0 L Turbo I6	28	(Armenia) Sergey Stolyarov	3–4
(Belgium) Team WRT	BMW M4 GT3 Evo	BMW S58B30T0 3.0 L Turbo I6	28	(Armenia) Rinat Salikhov	5–6
(Belgium) Team WRT	BMW M4 GT3 Evo	BMW S58B30T0 3.0 L Turbo I6	69	(United Kingdom) Dan Harper	All
(Belgium) Team WRT	BMW M4 GT3 Evo	BMW S58B30T0 3.0 L Turbo I6	69	(United States) Anthony McIntosh	All
(Belgium) Team WRT	BMW M4 GT3 Evo	BMW S58B30T0 3.0 L Turbo I6	69	(Canada) Parker Thompson	All
(United Kingdom) Ecurie Ecosse Blackthorn	Aston Martin Vantage AMR GT3 Evo	Aston Martin M177 4.0 L Turbo V8	56	(United Kingdom) Jonathan Adam	All
(United Kingdom) Ecurie Ecosse Blackthorn	Aston Martin Vantage AMR GT3 Evo	Aston Martin M177 4.0 L Turbo V8	56	(Belgium) Kobe Pauwels	All
(United Kingdom) Ecurie Ecosse Blackthorn	Aston Martin Vantage AMR GT3 Evo	Aston Martin M177 4.0 L Turbo V8	56	(Italy) Giacomo Petrobelli	All
(United Kingdom) United Autosports	McLaren 720S GT3 Evo	McLaren M840T 4.0 L Turbo V8	59	(United Kingdom) Wayne Boyd	All
(United Kingdom) United Autosports	McLaren 720S GT3 Evo	McLaren M840T 4.0 L Turbo V8	59	(Australia) Garnet Patterson	1–2
(United Kingdom) United Autosports	McLaren 720S GT3 Evo	McLaren M840T 4.0 L Turbo V8	59	(Australia) Mark Rosser	1–2
(United Kingdom) United Autosports	McLaren 720S GT3 Evo	McLaren M840T 4.0 L Turbo V8	59	(United Arab Emirates) Andrey Mukovoz	3–6
(United Kingdom) United Autosports	McLaren 720S GT3 Evo	McLaren M840T 4.0 L Turbo V8	59	(Slovenia) Alexey Nesov	3–6
(Malaysia) Johor Motorsports JMR	Chevrolet Corvette Z06 GT3.R	Chevrolet LT6.R 5.5 L V8	66	(Malaysia) Prince Abu Bakar Ibrahim	All
(Malaysia) Johor Motorsports JMR	Chevrolet Corvette Z06 GT3.R	Chevrolet LT6.R 5.5 L V8	66	(United Kingdom) Alexander Sims	All
(Malaysia) Johor Motorsports JMR	Chevrolet Corvette Z06 GT3.R	Chevrolet LT6.R 5.5 L V8	66	(Australia) Yasser Shahin	1–4
(Malaysia) Johor Motorsports JMR	Chevrolet Corvette Z06 GT3.R	Chevrolet LT6.R 5.5 L V8	66	(Malaysia) Prince Jefri Ibrahim	5–6
(Malaysia) Johor Motorsports JMR	Chevrolet Corvette Z06 GT3.R	Chevrolet LT6.R 5.5 L V8	99	(Malaysia) Prince Jefri Ibrahim	1–4
(Malaysia) Johor Motorsports JMR	Chevrolet Corvette Z06 GT3.R	Chevrolet LT6.R 5.5 L V8	99	(United Kingdom) Ben Green	1–4
(Malaysia) Johor Motorsports JMR	Chevrolet Corvette Z06 GT3.R	Chevrolet LT6.R 5.5 L V8	99	(Australia) Jordan Love	1–4
(Germany) Proton Competition	Porsche 911 GT3 R (992)	Porsche M97/80 4.2 L Flat-6	77	(Japan) "Bankcy"	All
(Germany) Proton Competition	Porsche 911 GT3 R (992)	Porsche M97/80 4.2 L Flat-6	77	(United Kingdom) Harry King	All
(Germany) Proton Competition	Porsche 911 GT3 R (992)	Porsche M97/80 4.2 L Flat-6	77	(Japan) Kiyoto Fujinami	1–2
(Germany) Proton Competition	Porsche 911 GT3 R (992)	Porsche M97/80 4.2 L Flat-6	77	(Netherlands) Huub van Eijndhoven	3–6
(China) Origine Motorsport	Porsche 911 GT3 R (992)	Porsche M97/80 4.2 L Flat-6	87	(Germany) Laurin Heinrich	All
(China) Origine Motorsport	Porsche 911 GT3 R (992)	Porsche M97/80 4.2 L Flat-6	87	(China) Leo Ye Hongli	All
(China) Origine Motorsport	Porsche 911 GT3 R (992)	Porsche M97/80 4.2 L Flat-6	87	(China) Bo Yuan	All
(New Zealand) EBM	Aston Martin Vantage AMR GT3 Evo	Aston Martin M177 4.0 L Turbo V8	89	(Australia) Martin Berry	1–2
(New Zealand) EBM	Aston Martin Vantage AMR GT3 Evo	Aston Martin M177 4.0 L Turbo V8	89	(United Kingdom) Jamie Day	1–2
(New Zealand) EBM	Aston Martin Vantage AMR GT3 Evo	Aston Martin M177 4.0 L Turbo V8	89	(Belgium) Matisse Lismont	1–2

- Phantom Global Racing entered the No. 41 Porsche 911 GT3 R (992) for "Andrea Anatra", Simon Birch, Dorian Boccolacci and "JZ", but the car did not appear at any rounds.
- Anthony Liu was scheduled to compete for GetSpeed Performance, but he was replaced prior to the start of the season.
- Julien Andlauer was scheduled to compete for Proton Competition, but he was replaced prior to the start of the season.
- Marco Sørensen and Anderson Tanoto were scheduled to compete for EBM, but did not appear at any rounds.

== Results ==
Bold indicates overall winner.

Round	Circuit	LMP2 Winning Team	LMP3 Winning Team	GT Winning Team	Ref.
Round	Circuit	LMP2 Winning Drivers	LMP3 Winning Drivers	GT Winning Drivers	Ref.
1	(Malaysia) Sepang	**(Italy) No. 47 Cetilar Racing**	(Poland) No. 13 Inter Europol Competition	(Germany) No. 9 GetSpeed Performance	Report
1	(Malaysia) Sepang	**(Italy) Antonio Fuoco** **(Italy) Roberto Lacorte** **(France) Charles Milesi**	(Saint Kitts and Nevis) Alexander Bukhantsov (Chinese Taipei) Chun-Ting Chou (Colombia) Henry Cubides Olarte	(United States) Anthony Bartone (Germany) Fabian Schiller (Japan) Shigekazu Wakisaka	Report
2	(Malaysia) Sepang	**(Italy) No. 47 Cetilar Racing**	(Switzerland) No. 17 CLX Motorsport	(Switzerland) No. 74 Kessel Racing	Report
2	(Malaysia) Sepang	**(Italy) Antonio Fuoco** **(Italy) Roberto Lacorte** **(France) Charles Milesi**	(United States) Alexander Jacoby (France) Paul Lanchère (Switzerland) Kévin Rabin	(United States) Dustin Blattner (United Kingdom) Chris Lulham (Germany) Dennis Marschall	Report
3	(United Arab Emirates) Dubai	**(United States) No. 04 CrowdStrike Racing by APR**	(Poland) No. 13 Inter Europol Competition	(Switzerland) No. 74 Kessel Racing	Report
3	(United Arab Emirates) Dubai	**(Switzerland) Louis Delétraz** **(Denmark) Malthe Jakobsen** **(United States) George Kurtz**	(Saint Kitts and Nevis) Alexander Bukhantsov (Chinese Taipei) Chun-Ting Chou (Colombia) Henry Cubides Olarte	(United States) Dustin Blattner (United Kingdom) Chris Lulham (Germany) Dennis Marschall	Report
4	(United Arab Emirates) Dubai	**(United States) No. 04 CrowdStrike Racing by APR**	(France) No. 71 23Events Racing	(Belgium) No. 69 Team WRT	Report
4	(United Arab Emirates) Dubai	**(Switzerland) Louis Delétraz** **(Denmark) Malthe Jakobsen** **(United States) George Kurtz**	(Egypt) Ibrahim Badawy (Slovakia) Matúš Ryba (United Kingdom) Terrence Woodward	(United Kingdom) Dan Harper (United States) Anthony McIntosh (Canada) Parker Thompson	Report
5	(United Arab Emirates) Abu Dhabi	**(United States) No. 04 CrowdStrike Racing by APR**	(Switzerland) No. 17 CLX Motorsport	(Belgium) No. 69 Team WRT	Report
5	(United Arab Emirates) Abu Dhabi	**(Switzerland) Louis Delétraz** **(Denmark) Malthe Jakobsen** **(United States) George Kurtz**	(United States) Alexander Jacoby (France) Paul Lanchère (Switzerland) Kévin Rabin	(United Kingdom) Dan Harper (United States) Anthony McIntosh (Canada) Parker Thompson	Report
6	(United Arab Emirates) Abu Dhabi	**(Luxembourg) No. 3 DKR Engineering**	(France) No. 23 23Events Racing	(United Kingdom) No. 56 Ecurie Ecosse Blackthorn	Report
6	(United Arab Emirates) Abu Dhabi	**(Germany) Alexander Mattschull** **(Switzerland) Mathias Beche** **(Australia) Griffin Peebles**	(United Kingdom) Isaac Barashi (Italy) Matteo Quintarelli (France) Louis Stern	(United Kingdom) Jonathan Adam (Belgium) Kobe Pauwels (Italy) Giacomo Petrobelli	Report

== Teams' Championships ==
Points are awarded according to the following structure:

Position	**1st**	**2nd**	**3rd**	**4th**	**5th**	**6th**	**7th**	**8th**	**9th**	**10th**	**Pole**
Points	25	18	15	12	10	8	6	4	2	1	1

=== LMP2 Teams Championship ===
Pos.	Team	Car	SEP (Malaysia)		DUB (United Arab Emirates)		ABU (United Arab Emirates)		Points
1	(United States) #4 CrowdStrike Racing by APR	Oreca 07	3	3	1	1	1	8	109
2	(Italy) #47 Cetilar Racing	Oreca 07	1	1	2	4	11	10	81
3	(Portugal) #25 Algarve Pro Racing	Oreca 07	2	2	5	2	5	Ret	74
4	(Luxembourg) #3 DKR Engineering	Oreca 07	11	4	8	7	4	1	59
5	(France) #30 RD Limited	Oreca 07	6	8	3	5	3	11	52
6	(Portugal) #20 Algarve Pro Racing	Oreca 07	13	13	13	3	2	4	45
7	(United Kingdom) #5 United Autosports	Oreca 07	**5**	6	**6**	**Ret**	**Ret**	**7**	37
8	(Denmark) #49 High Class Racing	Oreca 07	12	**7**	9	6	8	3	36
9	(United Kingdom) #64 Nielsen Racing	Oreca 07	4	9	7	14	14	6	28
10	(United Kingdom) #6 United Autosports	Oreca 07	7	14	Ret	8	6	5	28
11	(Poland) #43 Inter Europol Competition	Oreca 07	14	12	11	NC	9	2	20
12	(Germany) #88 Proton Competition	Oreca 07	9	5	10	13	7	13	19
13	(United Kingdom) #70 Vector Sport RLR	Oreca 07	8	15	4	10	10	NC	18
14	(Slovakia) #44 ARC Bratislava	Oreca 07	10	10	Ret	9	Ret	Ret	4
15	(Japan) #45 PONOS Racing	Oreca 07	15	WD	12	11	12	9	2
16	(Germany) #22 Proton Competition	Oreca 07	16	11	14	12	13	11	0

Key
Colour	Result
Gold	Race winner
Silver	2nd place
Bronze	3rd place
Green	Points finish
Blue	Non-points finish
Blue	Non-classified finish (NC)
Purple	Did not finish (Ret)
Black	Disqualified (DSQ)
Black	Excluded (EX)
White	Did not start (DNS)
White	Race cancelled (C)
White	Withdrew (WD)
Blank	Did not participate

**Bold** – Pole
Italic – Fastest Lap

=== LMP3 Teams Championship ===
Pos.	Team	Car	SEP (Malaysia)		DUB (United Arab Emirates)		ABU (United Arab Emirates)		Points
1	(Switzerland) #17 CLX Motorsport	Ligier JS P325	**3**	**1**	**5**	**3**	**1**	**Ret**	96
2	(Poland) #13 Inter Europol Competition	Ligier JS P325	1	4	1	7	DSQ	2	86
3	(France) #71 23Events Racing	Ligier JS P325	Ret	2	3	1	6	3	81
4	(France) #29 Forestier Racing by VPS	Ligier JS P325	5	3	2	2	3	8	80
5	(France) #23 23Events Racing	Ligier JS P325	4	10	Ret	Ret	2	1	56
6	(Denmark) #94 High Class Racing	Ligier JS P325	2	7	6	5	NC	4	54
7	(Poland) #8 Team Virage	Ligier JS P325	6	5	4	8	5	6	52
8	(France) #85 R-ace GP	Duqueine D09	8	6	Ret	4	4	7	42
9	(Czech Republic) #26 Bretton Racing	Ligier JS P325	7	9	8	6	7	5	36
10	(Poland) #1 Team Virage	Ligier JS P325	NC	8	7	NC	Ret	Ret	10

=== GT Teams Championship ===
Pos.	Team	Car	SEP (Malaysia)		DUB (United Arab Emirates)		ABU (United Arab Emirates)		Points
1	(Switzerland) #74 Kessel Racing	Ferrari 296 GT3	5	1	1	4	3	9	94
2	(Belgium) #69 Team WRT	BMW M4 GT3 Evo	12	2	Ret	1	1	10	70
3	(Germany) #10 Manthey Racing	Porsche 911 GT3 R (992)	2	Ret	2	3	9	3	70
4	(Germany) #9 GetSpeed Performance	Mercedes-AMG GT3 Evo	1	6	7	6	**Ret**	**2**	69
5	(China) #87 Origine Motorsport	Porsche 911 GT3 R (992)	6	3	10	2	4	17	58
6	(United Kingdom) #56 Ecurie Ecosse Blackthorn	Aston Martin Vantage AMR GT3 Evo	3	13	Ret	10	8	1	47
7	(Italy) #21 AF Corse	Ferrari 296 GT3	Ret	7	3	17	6	4	43
8	(Germany) #92 Manthey Racing	Porsche 911 GT3 R (992)	4	8	9	4	7	12	38
9	(Qatar) #37 QMMF by GetSpeed	Mercedes-AMG GT3 Evo	19	10	**4**	**Ret**	5	16	27
10	(Italy) #54 Vista AF Corse	Ferrari 296 GT3	11	5	5	8	16	14	24
11	(Italy) #51 AF Corse	Ferrari 296 GT3	14	4	Ret	14	17	5	22
12	(United Kingdom) #59 United Autosports	McLaren 720S GT3 Evo	13	16	16	7	15	6	14
13	#34 Racing Team Turkey	Chevrolet Corvette Z06 GT3.R	8	19	8	9	Ret	11	13
14	(Germany) #77 Proton Competition	Porsche 911 GT3 R (992)	10	15	11	13	13	8	8
15	(New Zealand) #89 EBM	Aston Martin Vantage AMR GT3 Evo	7	14					6
16	(United Kingdom) #11 TF Sport	Chevrolet Corvette Z06 GT3.R	15	9	Ret	13	10	13	4
17	(Malaysia) #99 Johor Motorsports JMR	Chevrolet Corvette Z06 GT3.R	9	12	13	11	WD	WD	2
18	(Malaysia) #66 Johor Motorsports JMR	Chevrolet Corvette Z06 GT3.R	**16**	**Ret**	14	15	12	Ret	2
19	(Switzerland) #15 Kessel Racing	Ferrari 296 GT3	18	18	12	12	11	Ret	1
20	(Belgium) #28 UNX Racing by Team WRT	BMW M4 GT3 Evo	17	11					0
21	(Thailand) #50 Amerasian Fragrance by AF Racing	Ferrari 296 GT3	Ret	17	15	16	14	15	0
Teams ineligible to score points
	(Belgium) #28 Team WRT	BMW M4 GT3 Evo			6	Ret	2	7	

== Drivers' Championships ==
Points are awarded according to the following structure:

Position	1st	2nd	3rd	4th	5th	6th	7th	8th	9th	10th	Pole
Points	25	18	15	12	10	8	6	4	2	1	1

=== LMP2 Drivers Championship ===
Pos.	Drivers	Team	SEP (Malaysia)		DUB (United Arab Emirates)		ABU (United Arab Emirates)		Points
1	(Switzerland) Louis Delétraz	(United States) CrowdStrike Racing by APR	3	3	1	1	1	8	109
1	(Denmark) Malthe Jakobsen	(United States) CrowdStrike Racing by APR	3	3	1	1	1	8	109
1	(United States) George Kurtz	(United States) CrowdStrike Racing by APR	3	3	1	1	1	8	109
2	(Italy) Antonio Fuoco	(Italy) Cetilar Racing	1	1	2	4	11	10	81
2	(France) Charles Milesi	(Italy) Cetilar Racing	1	1	2	4	11	10	81
2	(Italy) Roberto Lacorte	(Italy) Cetilar Racing	1	1	2	4	11	10	81
3	(France) Tom Dillmann	(Portugal) Algarve Pro Racing	2	2	5	2	5	Ret	74
3	(Denmark) Michael Jensen	(Portugal) Algarve Pro Racing	2	2	5	2	5	Ret	74
3	(Italy) Enzo Trulli	(Portugal) Algarve Pro Racing	2	2	5	2	5	Ret	74
4	(Switzerland) Mathias Beche	(Luxembourg) DKR Engineering	11	4	8	7	4	1	59
4	(Germany) Alexander Mattschull	(Luxembourg) DKR Engineering	11	4	8	7	4	1	59
4	(Australia) Griffin Peebles	(Luxembourg) DKR Engineering	11	4	8	7	4	1	59
5	(Australia) James Allen	(France) RD Limited	6	8	3	5	3	12	52
5	(France) Tristan Vautier	(France) RD Limited	6	8	3	5	3	12	52
6	(United States) John Falb	(Portugal) Algarve Pro Racing	13	13	13	3	2	4	45
6	(Liechtenstein) Matthias Kaiser	(Portugal) Algarve Pro Racing	13	13	13	3	2	4	45
6	(France) Sami Meguetounif	(Portugal) Algarve Pro Racing	13	13	13	3	2	4	45
7	(Denmark) Mikkel Jensen	(United Kingdom) United Autosports	5	6	6	Ret	Ret	7	37
7	(Italy) Giorgio Roda	(United Kingdom) United Autosports	5	6	6	Ret	Ret	7	37
7	(Switzerland) Grégoire Saucy	(United Kingdom) United Autosports	5	6	6	Ret	Ret	7	37
8	(Denmark) Theodor Jensen	(Denmark) High Class Racing	12	7	9	6	8	3	36
8	(United States) Gustavo Menezes	(Denmark) High Class Racing	12	7	9	6	8	3	36
8	(Denmark) Jens Reno Møller	(Denmark) High Class Racing	12	7	9	6	8	3	36
9	(Turkey) Cem Bölükbaşı	(United Kingdom) Nielsen Racing	4	9	7	14	14	6	28
9	(Greece) Kriton Lendoudis	(United Kingdom) Nielsen Racing	4	9	7	14	14	6	28
9	(United Kingdom) Alex Quinn	(United Kingdom) Nielsen Racing	4	9	7	14	14	6	28
10	(United Kingdom) Paul di Resta	(United Kingdom) United Autosports	7	14	Ret	8	6	5	28
10	(Canada) Phil Fayer	(United Kingdom) United Autosports	7	14	Ret	8	6	5	28
10	(United Kingdom) Ben Hanley	(United Kingdom) United Autosports	7	14	Ret	8	6	5	28
11	(United States) Fred Poordad	(France) RD Limited	6	8			3	12	27
12	(United Kingdom) James Sweetnam	(France) RD Limited			3	5			25
13	(Greece) Georgios Kolovos	(Poland) Inter Europol Competition	14	12	11	NC	9	2	20
13	(United States) Nolan Siegel	(Poland) Inter Europol Competition	14	12	11	NC	9	2	20
14	(United States) Bijoy Garg	(Poland) Inter Europol Competition			11	NC	9	2	20
15	(Austria) Horst Felbermayr Jr.	(Germany) Proton Competition	9	5	10	13	7	13	19
15	(Austria) Horst Felix Felbermayr	(Germany) Proton Competition	9	5	10	13	7	13	19
15	(Spain) Lorenzo Fluxá	(Germany) Proton Competition	9	5	10	13	7	13	19
16	(United States) Jacob Abel	(United Kingdom) Vector Sport RLR	8	15	4	10	10	14	18
16	(Grenada) Vladislav Lomko	(United Kingdom) Vector Sport RLR	8	15	4	10	10	14	18
16	(Brazil) Daniel Schneider	(United Kingdom) Vector Sport RLR	8	15	4	10	10	14	18
17	(France) Yann Ehrlacher	(Slovakia) ARC Bratislava	10	10	Ret	9	Ret	Ret	4
17	(Slovakia) Miro Konôpka	(Slovakia) ARC Bratislava	10	10	Ret	9	Ret	Ret	4
17	(France) Matthieu Vaxivière	(Slovakia) ARC Bratislava	10	10	Ret	9	Ret	Ret	4
18	(Japan) Kei Cozzolino	(Japan) PONOS Racing	15	WD	12	11	12	9	2
18	(Japan) Marino Sato	(Japan) PONOS Racing	15	WD	12	11	12	9	2
18	(Japan) Yorikatsu Tsujiko	(Japan) PONOS Racing	15	WD	12	11	12	9	2
19	(Germany) Felipe Fernández Laser	(Germany) Proton Competition	16	11	14	12	13	11	0
19	(Germany) Jonas Ried	(Germany) Proton Competition	16	11	14	12	13	11	0
20	(Germany) Stefan Aust	(Germany) Proton Competition			14	12	13	11	0
21	(Portugal) Bernardo Sousa	(Germany) Proton Competition	16	11					0
22	(New Zealand) Nick Cassidy	(Poland) Inter Europol Competition	14	12					0

=== LMP3 Drivers Championship ===
Pos.	Drivers	Team	SEP (Malaysia)		DUB (United Arab Emirates)		ABU (United Arab Emirates)		Points
1	(United States) Alexander Jacoby	(Switzerland) CLX Motorsport	3	1	5	3	1	Ret	96
1	(France) Paul Lanchère	(Switzerland) CLX Motorsport	3	1	5	3	1	Ret	96
1	(Switzerland) Kévin Rabin	(Switzerland) CLX Motorsport	3	1	5	3	1	Ret	96
2	(Saint Kitts and Nevis) Alexander Bukhantsov	(Poland) Inter Europol Competition	1	4	1	7	DSQ	2	86
2	(Chinese Taipei) Chun-Ting Chou	(Poland) Inter Europol Competition	1	4	1	7	DSQ	2	86
3	(Slovakia) Matúš Ryba	(France) 23Events Racing	Ret	2	3	1	6	3	81
3	(United Kingdom) Terrence Woodward	(France) 23Events Racing	Ret	2	3	1	6	3	81
4	(United Kingdom) Nick Adcock	(France) Forestier Racing by VPS	5	3	2	2	3	8	80
4	(Brazil) Lucas Fecury	(France) Forestier Racing by VPS	5	3	2	2	3	8	80
4	(France) Luciano Morano	(France) Forestier Racing by VPS	5	3	2	2	3	8	80
5	(Egypt) Ibrahim Badawy	(France) 23Events Racing	Ret	2	3	1	6	3 (Note: Ibrahim Badawy, Henry Cubides Olarte, Aditya Patel, Isaac Barashi, Zack Scoular, and Theo Micouris did not fulfil their mandated minimum drive time during race 2 of the 4 Hours of Abu Dhabi, meaning that they did not receive points for that event.)	66
6	(Colombia) Henry Cubides Olarte	(Poland) Inter Europol Competition	1	4	1	7 (Note: Henry Cubides Olarte and Léna Bühler did not fulfil their mandated minimum drive time during race 2 of the 4 Hours of Dubai, meaning that they did not receive points for that event.)	DSQ	2	62
7	(Italy) Matteo Quintarelli	(France) 23Events Racing	4	10	Ret	Ret	2	1	56
7	(France) Louis Stern	(France) 23Events Racing	4	10	Ret	Ret	2	1	56
8	(Denmark) Philip Lindberg	(Denmark) High Class Racing	2	7	6	5	NC	4	54
8	(United Kingdom) Callum Voisin	(Denmark) High Class Racing	2	7	6	5	NC	4	54
8	(United Kingdom) Tim Whale	(Denmark) High Class Racing	2	7	6	5	NC	4	54
9	(France) Romain Vozniak	(Poland) Team Virage	6	5	5	8	5	6	52
10	(India) Aditya Patel	(Poland) Team Virage	6	5	5	8	5	6	44
=	(Belgium) Vic Stevens	(Poland) Team Virage	6 (Note: Vic Stevens and Hugo Schwarze did not fulfil their mandated minimum drive time during race 1 of the 4 Hours of Sepang, meaning that they did not receive points for that event.)	5	5	8	5	6	44
11	(Poland) Jacek Zielonka	(Czech Republic) Bretton Racing	7	9	8	6	7	5	36
12	(United Kingdom) Isaac Barashi	(France) 23Events Racing	4	10	Ret	Ret	2	1	31
13	(France) Fabien Michal	(France) R-ace GP	8	6			4	7	30
13	(Luxembourg) Pierre-Alexandre Provost	(France) R-ace GP	8	6			4	7	30
14	(Spain) Lucas Fluxá	(Czech Republic) Bretton Racing	7	9	8	6			20
14	(Germany) Lenny Ried	(Czech Republic) Bretton Racing	7	9	8	6			20
15	(United Kingdom) Haydn Chance	(Czech Republic) Bretton Racing					7	5	16
16	(New Zealand) Zack Scoular	(France) R-ace GP					4	7	12
17	(Singapore) Danial Frost	(France) R-ace GP			Ret	4			12
17	(Lebanon) Shahan Sarkissian	(France) R-ace GP			Ret	4			12
18	(Algeria) Julien Gerbi	(Poland) Team Virage	NC	8	7	NC	Ret	Ret	10
18	(India) Narain Karthikeyan	(Poland) Team Virage	NC	8	7	NC	Ret	Ret	10
18	(India) Ajith Kumar	(Poland) Team Virage	NC	8	7	NC	Ret	Ret	10
19	(Germany) Hugo Schwarze	(France) R-ace GP	8	6					8
20	(United Kingdom) Theo Micouris	(Czech Republic) Bretton Racing					7	5	6
21	(Switzerland) Léna Bühler	(France) R-ace GP			Ret	4			0

=== GT Drivers Championship ===
Pos.	Drivers	Team	SEP (Malaysia)		DUB (United Arab Emirates)		ABU (United Arab Emirates)		Points
1	(United States) Dustin Blattner	(Switzerland) Kessel Racing	5	1	1	4	3	9	94
1	(United Kingdom) Chris Lulham	(Switzerland) Kessel Racing	5	1	1	4	3	9	94
1	(Germany) Dennis Marschall	(Switzerland) Kessel Racing	5	1	1	4	3	9	94
2	(United States) Anthony McIntosh	(Belgium) Team WRT	12	2	Ret	1	1	10	70
2	(Canada) Parker Thompson	(Belgium) Team WRT	12	2	Ret	1	1	10	70
3	(Hong Kong) Antares Au	(Germany) Manthey Racing	2	Ret	2	3	9	3	70
3	(Netherlands) Loek Hartog	(Germany) Manthey Racing	2	Ret	2	3	9	3	70
4	(United States) Anthony Bartone	(Germany) GetSpeed Performance	1	6	7	6	Ret	2	69
4	(Germany) Fabian Schiller	(Germany) GetSpeed Performance	1	6	7	6	Ret	2	69
5	(United Kingdom) Dan Harper	(Belgium) Team WRT	12	2	Ret	1	1	10 (Note: Dan Harper and Klaus Bachler did not fulfil their mandated minimum drive time during race 2 of the 4 Hours of Abu Dhabi, meaning that they did not receive points for that event.)	68
6	(Germany) Laurin Heinrich	(China) Origine Motorsport	6	3	10	2	4	17	58
6	(China) Leo Ye Hongli	(China) Origine Motorsport	6	3	10	2	4	17	58
6	(China) Bo Yuan	(China) Origine Motorsport	6	3	10	2	4	17	58
7	(Austria) Klaus Bachler	(Germany) Manthey Racing	2	Ret	2	3	9	3	55
8	(United Kingdom) Jonathan Adam	(United Kingdom) Ecurie Ecosse Blackthorn	3	13	Ret	10	8	1	47
8	(Belgium) Kobe Pauwels	(United Kingdom) Ecurie Ecosse Blackthorn	3	13	Ret	10	8	1	47
8	(Italy) Giacomo Petrobelli	(United Kingdom) Ecurie Ecosse Blackthorn	3	13	Ret	10	8	1	47
9	(United Kingdom) Darren Leung	(Italy) AF Corse	Ret	7	3	17	6	4	43
9	(United States) Simon Mann	(Italy) AF Corse	Ret	7	3	17	6	4	43
9	(Italy) Alessio Rovera	(Italy) AF Corse	Ret	7	3	17	6	4	43
10	(France) François Hériau	(Germany) Manthey Racing	4	8	9	4	7	12	38
10	(Austria) Richard Lietz	(Germany) Manthey Racing	4	8	9	4	7	12	38
10	(Italy) Riccardo Pera	(Germany) Manthey Racing	4	8	9	4	7	12	38
11	(Luxembourg) Steve Jans	(Germany) GetSpeed Performance			7	6	Ret	2	36
12	(Japan) Shigekazu Wakisaka	(Germany) GetSpeed Performance	1	6					33
13	(Qatar) Abdulla Al-Khelaifi	(Qatar) QMMF by GetSpeed	19	10	4	Ret	5	16	27
13	(Austria) Lucas Auer	(Qatar) QMMF by GetSpeed	19	10	4	Ret	5	16	27
13	(Qatar) Ghanim Al-Maadheed	(Qatar) QMMF by GetSpeed	19	10	4	Ret	5	16	27
14	(Italy) Francesco Castellacci	(Italy) Vista AF Corse	11	5	5	8	16	14	24
15	(Indonesia) Sean Gelael	(Italy) AF Corse	14	4	Ret	14	17	5	22
15	(Italy) Davide Rigon	(Italy) AF Corse	14	4	Ret	14	17	5	22
15	(France) Charles-Henri Samani	(Italy) AF Corse	14	4	Ret	14	17	5	22
16	(Netherlands) Yelmer Buurman	(Italy) Vista AF Corse			5	8			14
16	(Netherlands) Nigel Schoonderwoerd	(Italy) Vista AF Corse			5	8			14
17	(United Kingdom) Wayne Boyd	(United Kingdom) United Autosports	13	16	16	7	15	6	14
18	(United Arab Emirates) Andrey Mukovoz	(United Kingdom) United Autosports			16	7	15	6	14
18	(Slovenia) Alexey Nesov	(United Kingdom) United Autosports			16	7	15	6	14
19	(Republic of Ireland) Charlie Eastwood	Racing Team Turkey	8	19	8	9	Ret	11	13
19	(Belgium) Tom Van Rompuy	Racing Team Turkey	8	19	8	9	Ret	11	13
19	(Turkey) Salih Yoluç	Racing Team Turkey	8	19	8	9	Ret	11	13
20	(Switzerland) Thomas Flohr	(Italy) Vista AF Corse	11	5					10
20	(Italy) Alessandro Pier Guidi	(Italy) Vista AF Corse	11	5					10
21	(Japan) "Bankcy"	(Germany) Proton Competition	10	15	11	13	13	8	8
21	(United Kingdom) Harry King	(Germany) Proton Competition	10	15	11	13	13	8	8
22	(Netherlands) Huub van Eijndhoven	(Germany) Proton Competition			11	13	13	8	7
23	(Australia) Martin Berry	(New Zealand) EBM	7	14					6
23	(United Kingdom) Jamie Day	(New Zealand) EBM	7	14					6
23	(Belgium) Matisse Lismont	(New Zealand) EBM	7	14					6
24	(United Kingdom) Matt Bell	(United Kingdom) TF Sport	15	9	Ret	13	10	13	4
24	(United States) Blake McDonald	(United Kingdom) TF Sport	15	9	Ret	13	10	13	4
24	(Republic of Ireland) James Roe	(United Kingdom) TF Sport	15	9	Ret	13	10	13	4
25	(Malaysia) Prince Jefri Ibrahim	(Malaysia) Johor Motorsports JMR	9	12	13	11	12	Ret	2
26	(United Kingdom) Ben Green	(Malaysia) Johor Motorsports JMR	9	12	13	11	WD	WD	2
26	(Australia) Jordan Love	(Malaysia) Johor Motorsports JMR	9	12	13	11	WD	WD	2
27	(Malaysia) Prince Abu Bakar Ibrahim	(Malaysia) Johor Motorsports JMR	16	Ret	14	15	16	Ret	2
27	(United Kingdom) Alexander Sims	(Malaysia) Johor Motorsports JMR	16	Ret	14	15	16	Ret	2
28	(Australia) Yasser Shahin	(Malaysia) Johor Motorsports JMR	16	Ret	14	15	WD	WD	2
29	(Japan) Kiyoto Fujinami	(Germany) Proton Competition	10	15					1
30	(Italy) Alessandro Balzan	(Switzerland) Kessel Racing	18	18	12	12	11	Ret	1
30	(United States) Memo Gidley	(Switzerland) Kessel Racing	18	18	12	12	11	Ret	1
30	(United States) Dylan Medler	(Switzerland) Kessel Racing	18	18	12	12	11	Ret	1
31	(Brazil) Augusto Farfus	(Belgium) UNX Racing by Team WRT	17	11					0
31	(Brazil) Augusto Farfus	(Belgium) Team WRT			6	Ret	2	7	0
32	(Belgium) Mathieu Detry	(Belgium) UNX Racing by Team WRT	17	11					0
32	(Belgium) Fabian Duffieux	(Belgium) UNX Racing by Team WRT	17	11					0
33	(Australia) Garnet Patterson	(United Kingdom) United Autosports	13	16					0
33	(Australia) Mark Rosser	(United Kingdom) United Autosports	13	16					0
34	(Thailand) Carl Bennett	(Thailand) Amerasian Fragrance by AF Racing	Ret	17	15	16	14	15	0
34	(United States) Gregory Bennett	(Thailand) Amerasian Fragrance by AF Racing	Ret	17	15	16	14	15	0
34	(Italy) Tommaso Mosca	(Thailand) Amerasian Fragrance by AF Racing	Ret	17	15	16	14	15	0
35	(Italy) Riccardo Agostini	(Italy) AF Corse					16	14	0
35	(Brazil) Custodio Toledo	(Italy) AF Corse					16	14	0
Drivers ineligible to score points
	(Italy) Gabriele Piana	(Belgium) Team WRT			6	Ret	2	7	
	Rinat Salikhov	(Belgium) Team WRT					2	7	
	Sergey Stolyarov	(Belgium) Team WRT			6	Ret			
