= CLX Motorsport =

Swiss racing team

(Switzerland) CLX Motorsport
- Founded: 2017
- Founder(s): Patrick Barbier; Alexandre Coigny
- Base: Annecy, France
- Team principal(s): Alexandre Coigny; Nicolas Lapierre
- Current series: European Le Mans Series; Le Mans Cup; Asian Le Mans Series; Asian Le Mans Cup
- Former series: FIA World Endurance Championship; Ligier European Series; French GT4 Cup; 24H Series; Ultimate Cup Series
- Current drivers: European Le Mans Series: 37. (Spain) Lorenzo Fluxá (Denmark) Malthe Jakobsen (Japan) Ritomo Miyata; 47. (Mexico) Alex García (Austria) Ferdinand Habsburg (Denmark) Frederik Vesti; 17. (Portugal) Miguel Cristóvão (Portugal) Manuel Espírito Santo (Switzerland) Cédric Oltramare; Le Mans Cup: 87. (France) Adrien Closmenil (United Kingdom) James Sweetnam; 97. (France) Adrien Chila (Switzerland) David Droux
- Website: https://cool-racing.ch/

CLX Motorsport, formerly known as Cool Racing, is a French-based Swiss sports car racing team which currently competes in the European Le Mans Series, fielding entries in the LMP2 and LMP3 classes, as well as the Le Mans Cup.

Cool Racing logo

Founded in 2017 by Patrick Barbier and Alexandre Coigny, owner of Cool Aviation, the team initially partnered with Racing Spirit of Léman to run their operations. At the end of 2020, a restructuring occurred, during which Nicolas Lapierre became the team principal and the outfit was rebranded to Cool Racing / CLX Motorsport; the C and L standing for Coigny and Lapierre respectively. CLX fully absorbed the team in 2025.

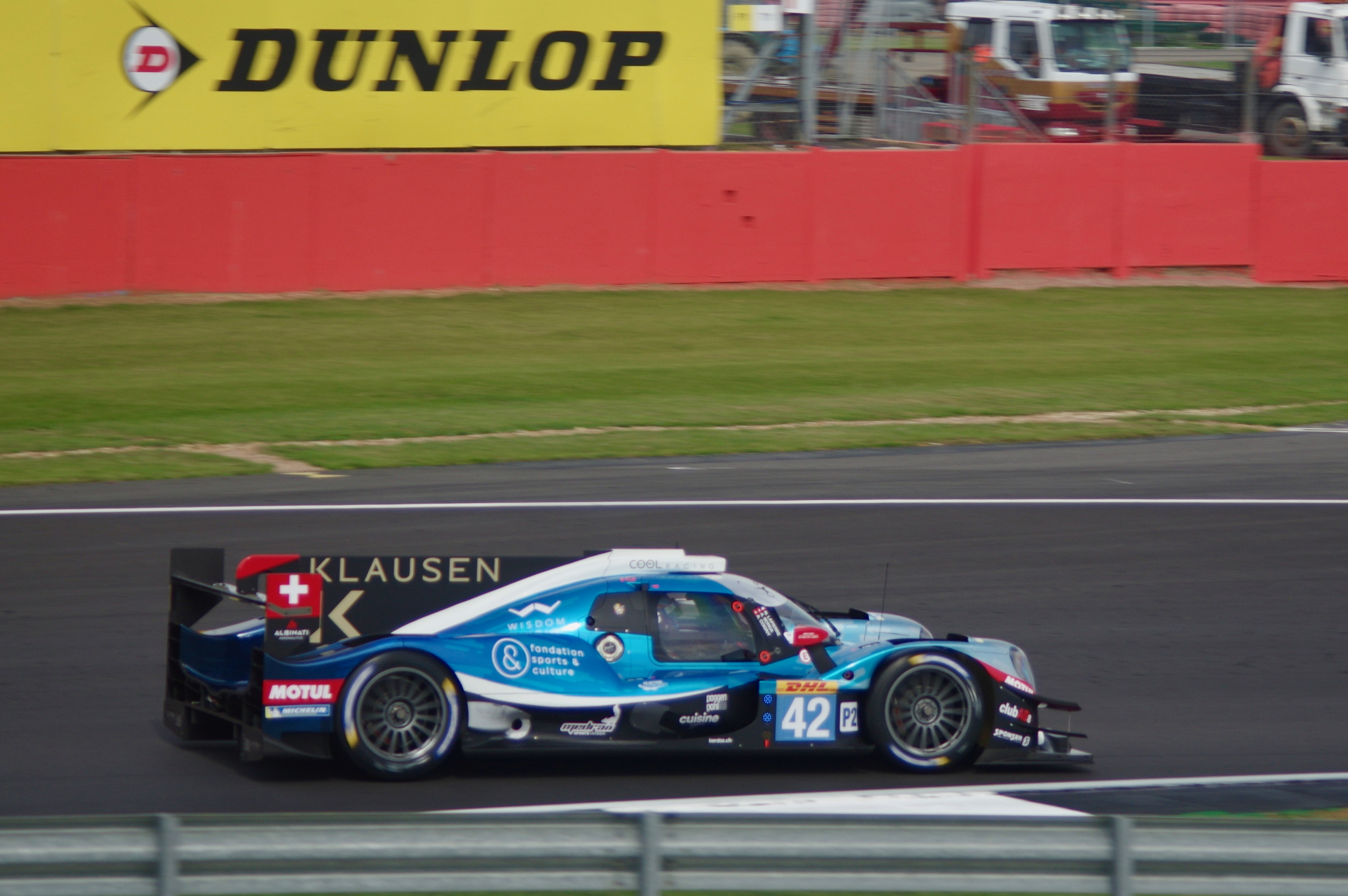
Cool Racing at the 2019 4 Hours of Silverstone

== Results & Achievements ==
=== Main Championship Titles ===
- European Le Mans Series
  - LMP3 Teams’ Champion in 2022, 2023, 2025 and 2026
  - LMP3 Drivers’ Champion in 2022, 2023, 2025 and 2026
- Asian Le Mans Series
  - LMP3 Teams’ Champion in 2023–24 and 2025–26
  - LMP3 Drivers' Champion in 2023–24 and 2025–26
- Le Mans Cup
  - LMP3 Teams’ Champion in 2024
  - LMP3 Drivers’ Champion in 2024

=== Notable Victories ===
- Overall Winner - 2020 Road to Le Mans
- Overall Winner - 2022 Road to Le Mans
- Overall Winner - 2023 Road to Le Mans
- Overall Winner - 2025 Road to Le Mans

== Racing record ==
=== 24 Hours of Le Mans results ===
Year	Entrant	No.	Car	Drivers	Class	Laps	Pos.	Class Pos.
2020	(Switzerland) Cool Racing	42	Oreca 07-Gibson	(Switzerland) Antonin Borga (Switzerland) Alexandre Coigny (France) Nicolas Lapierre	LMP2	365 (Note: The No. 42 Oreca was penalised 2 minutes and 3.880 seconds for Alexandre Coigny exceeding the maximum drive time of four hours in a six-hour period. The penalty demoted the car one position.)	12th	8th
2022	(Switzerland) Cool Racing	37	Oreca 07-Gibson	(Germany) Niklas Krütten (United States) Ricky Taylor (China) Yifei Ye	LMP2	367	11th	7th
2023	(Switzerland) Cool Racing	37	Oreca 07-Gibson	(Switzerland) Alexandre Coigny (Denmark) Malthe Jakobsen (France) Nicolas Lapierre	LMP2 (Pro-Am)	317	23rd	2nd
2023	(Switzerland) Cool Racing	47	Oreca 07-Gibson	(France) Reshad de Gerus; Vladislav Lomko (France) Simon Pagenaud	LMP2	158	DNF	DNF
2024	(Switzerland) Cool Racing	37	Oreca 07-Gibson	(Spain) Lorenzo Fluxá (Denmark) Malthe Jakobsen (Japan) Ritomo Miyata	LMP2	289	26th	12th
2024	(Switzerland) Cool Racing	47	Oreca 07-Gibson	(United Kingdom) Matt Bell (United States) Naveen Rao (Denmark) Frederik Vesti	LMP2 (Pro-Am)	291	24th	5th
2025	(Lithuania) CLX – Pure Rxcing	37	Oreca 07-Gibson	(United Kingdom) Tom Blomqvist (Saint Kitts and Nevis) Alex Malykhin (France) Tristan Vautier	LMP2	358	32nd	14th
2026	(Switzerland) CLX Motorsport	37	Oreca 07-Gibson	(Mexico) Ian Aguilera (France) Adrien Closmenil (Denmark) Theodor Jensen	LMP2	360	19th	5th

=== European Le Mans Series ===
Year	Entrant	Class	No	Chassis	Engine	Drivers	1	2	3	4	5	6	Pos.	Pts
2017	(France) Cool Racing by GPC	LMP3	4	Ligier JS P3	Nissan VK50VE 5.6 L V8	(Switzerland) Iradj Alexander (Switzerland) Gino Forgione (rounds 1–2) (Switzerland) Alexandre Coigny (rounds 2–6)	SIL; 14	MNZ; 14	RBR; NC	LEC; 10	SPA; 12	ALG; 11	16th	3
2018	(Switzerland) Cool Racing	LMP3	4	Ligier JS P3	Nissan VK50VE 5.6 L V8	(Switzerland) Iradj Alexander (rounds 1–4, 6) (Switzerland) Antonin Borga (rounds 1–3, 5–6) (Switzerland) Alexandre Coigny (rounds 1–3, 5–6) (Switzerland) Lucas Borga (round 4) (Switzerland) Christian Vaglio (round 4)	LEC; 10	MNZ; 9	RBR; 10	SIL; 11	SPA; 6‡	ALG; 13	13th	9
2019	(Switzerland) Cool Racing	LMP2	37	Oreca 07	Gibson GK428 4.2L V8	(Switzerland) Antonin Borga (France) Nicolas Lapierre (Switzerland) Alexandre Coigny (rounds 1–4, 6)	LEC; 7	MNZ; 8	CAT; 3	SIL; Ret	SPA; 2	ALG; 14	7th	44.5
2020	(Switzerland) Cool Racing	LMP2	37	Oreca 07	Gibson GK428 4.2L V8	(Switzerland) Antonin Borga (Switzerland) Alexandre Coigny (France) Nicolas Lapierre	LEC; 4	SPA; 10	LEC; 12	MNZ; 4	ALG; 9		7th	28.5
2021	(Switzerland) Cool Racing	LMP3	19	Ligier JS P320	Nissan VK56VE 5.6 L V8	(United Kingdom) Matthew Bell (Germany) Niklas Krütten (France) Nicolas Maulini	CAT; 1	RBR; 1	LEC; 2	MNZ; 4	SPA; 2	ALG; 8	2nd	104
2021	(Switzerland) Cool Racing	LMP2	37	Oreca 07	Gibson GK428 4.2L V8	(Switzerland) Alexandre Coigny (France) Nicolas Lapierre (Switzerland) Antonin Borga (rounds 1–4) (France) Charles Milesi (rounds 5–6)	CAT; 10	RBR; 10	LEC; 12	MNZ; 12	SPA; 4	ALG; 6	11th	25
2022	(Switzerland) Cool Racing	LMP3	17	Ligier JS P320	Nissan VK56VE 5.6 L V8	(United Kingdom) Mike Benham (Denmark) Malthe Jakobsen (United States) Maurice Smith	LEC; 1	IMO; 3	MNZ; Ret	CAT; 3	SPA; Ret	ALG; 1	1st	86
2022	(Switzerland) Cool Racing	LMP3	27	Ligier JS P320	Nissan VK56VE 5.6 L V8	(France) Antoine Doquin (France) Jean-Ludovic Foubert (Switzerland) Nicolas Maulini	LEC; Ret	IMO; 2	MNZ; 6	CAT; Ret	SPA; 4	ALG; 3	6th	53
2022	(Switzerland) Cool Racing	LMP2	37	Oreca 07	Gibson GK428 4.2L V8	(Germany) Niklas Krütten (France) Nicolas Lapierre (China) Ye Yifei	LEC; 5	IMO; 3	MNZ; 8	CAT; 3	SPA; 5	ALG; 3	4th	70
2023	(Switzerland) Cool Racing	LMP3	17	Ligier JS P320	Nissan VK56VE 5.6 L V8	(France) Adrien Chila (Mexico) Alex García (Argentina) Marcos Siebert	CAT; 1	LEC; 3	ARA; 1	SPA; 1	POR; 4	ALG; 2	1st	121
2023	(Switzerland) Cool Racing	LMP2 Pro-Am	37	Oreca 07	Gibson GK428 4.2L V8	(Switzerland) Alexandre Coigny (Denmark) Malthe Jakobsen (France) Nicolas Lapierre	CAT; 3	LEC; 2	ARA; Ret	SPA; 1	POR; 1	ALG; 2	2nd	101
2023	(Switzerland) Cool Racing	LMP2	47	Oreca 07	Gibson GK428 4.2L V8	(France) Reshad de Gerus; Vladislav Lomko (Argentina) José María López	CAT; 4	LEC; 4	ARA; 5	SPA; 3	POR; 4	ALG; 7	6th	69
2024	(Switzerland) Cool Racing	LMP3	17	Ligier JS P320	Nissan VK56VE 5.6 L V8	(Portugal) Miguel Cristóvão (Portugal) Manuel Espírito Santo (Switzerland) Cédric Oltramare (rounds 1–5)	CAT; 2	LEC; 5	IMO; 8	SPA; 3	MUG; Ret	ALG; 1	4th	75
2024	(Switzerland) Cool Racing	LMP2	37	Oreca 07	Gibson GK428 4.2L V8	(Spain) Lorenzo Fluxá (Denmark) Malthe Jakobsen (Japan) Ritomo Miyata (rounds 1–2, 4–6) (France) Paul-Loup Chatin	CAT; 1	LEC; Ret	IMO; Ret	SPA; 5	MUG; 9	ALG; 1	3rd	62
2024	(Switzerland) Cool Racing	LMP2	47	Oreca 07	Gibson GK428 4.2L V8	(Mexico) Alex García (rounds 1–2) (Denmark) Frederik Vesti (France) Paul-Loup Chatin (round 1–2) (Austria) Ferdinand Habsburg (3–6) (Thailand) Carl Bennett (rounds 3–6)	CAT; 12	LEC; 2	IMO; 10	SPA; 11	MUG; 13	ALG; 3	9th	34
2025	(Switzerland) CLX Motorsport	LMP3	17	Ligier JS P320	Nissan VK56VE 5.6 L V8	(France) Adrien Closmenil (Denmark) Theodor Jensen (France) Paul Lanchère	CAT; 1	LEC; 1	IMO; 1	SPA; Ret	SIL; 1	ALG; 1	1st	130
2025	(Switzerland) CLX Motorsport	LMP2	47	Oreca 07	Gibson GK428 4.2L V8	(Portugal) Manuel Espírito Santo (Brazil) Enzo Fittipaldi (Brazil) Pipo Derani (rounds 1–3) (Mexico) Sebastián Álvarez (round 4)	CAT; Ret	LEC; 3	IMO; 5	SPA; 6	SIL; 12	ALG; 6	6th	41
2025	(Lithuania) CLX – Pure Rxcing	LMP2	37	Oreca 07	Gibson GK428 4.2L V8	(United Kingdom) Tom Blomqvist (rounds 1–5) (United Kingdom) Alex Malykhin (rounds 1–5) (France) Tristan Vautier (rounds 1–5)	CAT; 4	LEC; Ret	IMO; 10	SPA; 9	SIL; Ret	ALG	11th	15
2026	(Switzerland) CLX Motorsport	LMP3	17	Ligier JS P320	Nissan VK56VE 5.6 L V8	(France) Paul Lanchère (Brazil) Alexander Jacoby (Brazil) Bruno Ribeiro (rounds 1–2) (France) Louis Iglesias (rounds 3-6)	BAR; 8	LEC; 5	IMO; 1	SPA; 1	SIL; 2	POR; 1	1st	110
2026	(Switzerland) CLX Motorsport	LMP2	37	Oreca 07	Gibson GK428 4.2L V8	(Mexico) Ian Aguilera (France) Adrien Closmenil (Denmark) Theodor Jensen	BAR; 8	LEC; 6	IMO; 8	SPA; 7	SIL; 5	POR; 7	8th	36
2026	(Switzerland) CLX Motorsport	LMP2 Pro-Am	47	Oreca 07	Gibson GK428 4.2L V8	(Greece) Georgios Kolovos (France) Charles Milesi (Brazil) Felipe Fraga (round 1) (Austria) Ferdinand Habsburg (rounds 2-6)	BAR; Ret	LEC; 9	IMO; 6	SPA; 11	SIL; 5	POR; 2	9th	38

^{*} Season still in progress.

=== Asian Le Mans Series ===
Year	Entrant	Class	No	Chassis	Engine	Drivers	1	2	3	4	5	6	Pos.	Pts
2023	(Switzerland) Cool Racing	LMP3	17	Ligier JS P320	Nissan VK56VE 5.6 L V8	(France) Adrien Chila (Switzerland) Cédric Oltramare (Argentina) Marcos Siebert	DUB; 14	DUB; Ret	ABU; 6	ABU; 2			8th	26
2023	(Switzerland) Cool Racing	LMP2	37	Oreca 07	Gibson GK428 4.2L V8	(Switzerland) Alexandre Coigny (Denmark) Malthe Jakobsen (France) Nicolas Lapierre (rounds 1–2)	DUB; 8	DUB; 5	ABU; 1	ABU; 3			2nd	54
2023-24	(Switzerland) Cool Racing	LMP3	17	Ligier JS P320	Nissan VK56VE 5.6 L V8	(Saint Kitts and Nevis) Alexander Bukhantsov (United Kingdom) James Winslow (Singapore) Danial Frost (rounds 1–2) (Portugal) Manuel Espírito Santo (rounds 4–5)	SEP; 1	SEP; 3	DUB; 1	ABU; 2	ABU; 2		1st	104
2023-24	(Switzerland) Cool Racing	LMP2	47	Oreca 07	Gibson GK428 4.2L V8	(Switzerland) Alexandre Coigny (rounds 3–5) (Spain) Lorenzo Fluxá (rounds 3–5) (France) Vladislav Lomko (rounds 3–5)	SEP	SEP	DUB; Ret	ABU; 12	ABU; 10		13th	1
2025-26	(Switzerland) CLX Motorsport	LMP3	17	Ligier JS P320	Nissan VK56VE 5.6 L V8	(United States) Alexander Jacoby (France) Paul Lanchère (Switzerland) Kévin Rabin	SEP; 3	SEP; 1	DUB; 5	DUB; 3	ABU; 1	ABU; Ret	1st	96
2026-27*	(Switzerland) CLX Motorsport	LMP2	37	Oreca 07	Gibson GK428 4.2L V8	(France) Adrien Closmenil (France) Louis Stern (France) Matthieu Vaxivière	LEC; 2	LEC; 2	JER	JER	POR	POR	1st*	36*

^{*} Season still in progress.

=== FIA World Endurance Championship ===
Year	Entrant	Class	No	Chassis	Engine	Drivers	1	2	3	4	5	6	7	8	Pos.	Pts
2019–20	(Switzerland) Cool Racing	LMP2	42	Oreca 07	Gibson GK428 4.2L V8	(Switzerland) Antonin Borga (France) Nicolas Lapierre (Switzerland) Alexandre Coigny (rounds 2–7)	SIL; 1	FUJ; 5	SHA; Ret	BHR; 6	COA; 4	SPA; 2	LMS; 4	BHR	6th	103
