= Asian Le Mans Series =

Auto racing series in Asia

- Category: Endurance racing
- Region: Asia & Middle East
- Inaugural season: 2009
- Prototype classes: Le Mans Hypercar, LMP2
- GT classes: GT
- Teams: 29
- Constructors: Hypercar: Ferrari GT: McLaren • Ferrari • Aston Martin • Porsche • Mercedes-Benz • BMW • Ford • Lamborghini
- Chassis manufacturers: Hypercar: Dallara LMP2: Oreca
- Engine manufacturers: LMP2: Gibson
- Tyre suppliers: Michelin
- Drivers' champion: LMP2: (Switzerland) Louis Deletraz (Denmark) Malthe Jakobsen (United States) George Kurtz; LMP3: (United States) Alexander Jacoby (France) Paul Lanchère (Switzerland) Kevin Rabin; GT: (United States) Dustin Blattner (United Kingdom) Chris Lulham (Germany) Dennis Marschall
- Teams' champion: LMP2: (United States) CrowdStrike Racing by APR; LMP3: (Switzerland) CLX Motorsport; GT: (Switzerland) Kessel Racing
- Official website: asianlemansseries.com

The Asian Le Mans Series (AsLMS) (Note: Sources:) is an Asian sports car racing endurance series created by the Automobile Club de l'Ouest (ACO) and based in Asia. It is the successor to the defunct Japan Le Mans Challenge which folded in 2007 after its second season. The ACO aims to attract teams and drivers from Asian countries.

A teasing race was to be held in Shanghai, China on November 1–2, 2008 but was later cancelled. The inaugural season's race, the 2009 1000 km of Okayama, was held on 30 October and 1 November 2009 at Okayama, Japan with one 500 km race per day. It was the only event of the inaugural season. A second Asian Le Mans Series event, scheduled for the Shanghai International Circuit, China, on 7 and 8 November was cancelled by the ACO due to economic circumstances. The winning teams in each of the four categories (LMP1, LMP2, GT1 and GT2) earned automatic invitations to the 2010 24 Hours of Le Mans. The series was relaunched for the 2013 season with an announcement at the 2012 24 Hours of Le Mans.

== History ==
Following the end of the All Japan Sports Prototype Championship (JSPC) in 1992 there was no major endurance series involving sports prototypes in Asia, although there was a grand tourer championship in the All Japan Grand Touring Car Championship (JGTC), the predecessor to today's Super GT series.

Plans for a new endurance championship were initially conceived by Don Panoz and backed by the ACO in 2000 with plans for an Asian-Pacific Le Mans Series, modeled after his American Le Mans Series and planned European Le Mans Series for 2001. Two previews of this event were held. The 1999 Le Mans Fuji 1000km at the Fuji Speedway in Japan combined Le Mans cars with JGTC machines for automatic entries to the 2000 24 Hours of Le Mans. This idea was followed by the American Le Mans Series with the 2000 Race of a Thousand Years race at the Adelaide Street Circuit in Australia. These two events served as a precursor to the planned APLMS series, and at the time of the creation of ELMS, Don Panoz announced his intention to hold an exhibition APLMS race at Sepang International Circuit in Malaysia in late 2001.

However, the European Le Mans Series suffered from a lack of entrants during its debut season and was eventually canceled. Don Panoz decided that the APLMS would likely have even less interest. Thus the APLMS exhibition race and all plans for an Asian series were scrapped.

The ACO attempted to develop their own championship modeled on their own Le Mans Endurance Series in 2006 with the development of the Japan Le Mans Challenge, overseen by the Sports Car Endurance Race Operation (SERO). It too lacked competitors and was canceled after its second season.

In 2009, a reborn Asian Le Mans Series held an inaugural event in Okayama, Japan with two 500 km races. A 1000 km race in Zhuhai, China, was held as part of the Intercontinental Le Mans Cup in 2010, and it was also part of the Asian Le Mans Series.

At the 2012 24 Hours of Le Mans the ACO announced the revival of the Asian Le Mans Series for the 2013 series. The format will be run very similarly to the European Le Mans Series, with the ACO expecting around 16-18 cars for the first relaunched season. However, only 8 cars showed up for the first race of the season, making it the smallest ever grid in ACO sanctioned racing. This record was broken a year later when only six cars started the first race of the 2014 season at Inje.

The ACO further announced that cars running under the GT300 regulations in the Japanese Super GT series would be eligible to enter in the Asian Le Mans Series' GTC class, with organisers from both series working together to create calendars that would allow GT300 teams to compete in both championships.

Following the end of the 2014 season, the ACO took over as the organizer for the series from the S2M Group. A primary issue that supported the takeover included low car counts for the season which prompted the cancellation of a scheduled round in Thailand and limited the series to grow while only in its second year. Plans for 2015 include a three-race calendar to begin later in the year around September then expand to five rounds in 2016 with the first race in the spring. One round will be held on the same weekend as the FIA World Endurance Championship, similar to the double-headers it shares with the European Le Mans Series and the WeatherTech SportsCar Championship. Class structure will remain unchanged.

In October 2016, the Asian Le Mans Series announced a partnership with the GT Asia Series. It includes a new Michelin Asia GT Challenge, which is a combined classification for GT3 teams, where the winner will get an invitation to the 24 Hours of Le Mans.

In January 2020, the Asian Le Mans Series hosted its first race outside the continent of Asia when the series traveled to Australia and The Bend Motorsport Park, located in the rural town of Tailem Bend in South Australia. There they would race on The Bend's 7.770 km (4.828 mi) GT Circuit for a race known as the 4 Hours of The Bend. Despite the success of the race, unfortunately it proved to be a one off as the planned return of the ALMS did not eventuate due to the global COVID-19 pandemic. It was originally announced that the ALMS would return to The Bend in 2021/22 and 2022/23, but the global pandemic and a change in series focus to an annual series, plus cutting costs for the teams (including travel), has seen that to date (2025), the ALMS has not returned to The Bend or any other race track in Australia.

The 2021 season marked the series first venture to the Middle East racing in the United Arab Emirates for two 4 Hours of Dubai races at the Dubai Autodrome followed by two 4 Hours of Abu Dhabi races at the Yas Marina Circuit. The championship was run entirely within the UAE for two more years until the 2023–24 season when the 4 Hours of Sepang at the Sepang International Circuit returned.

During the 2025 24 Hours of Le Mans weekend, the ACO announced the new premier class of the Asian Le Mans Series will be Hypercar (LMH or LMDh) starting in the 2026–27 season. The class is for non-factory, privateer entries only in a pro-am format with at least one bronze driver mandated.

== Logo history ==
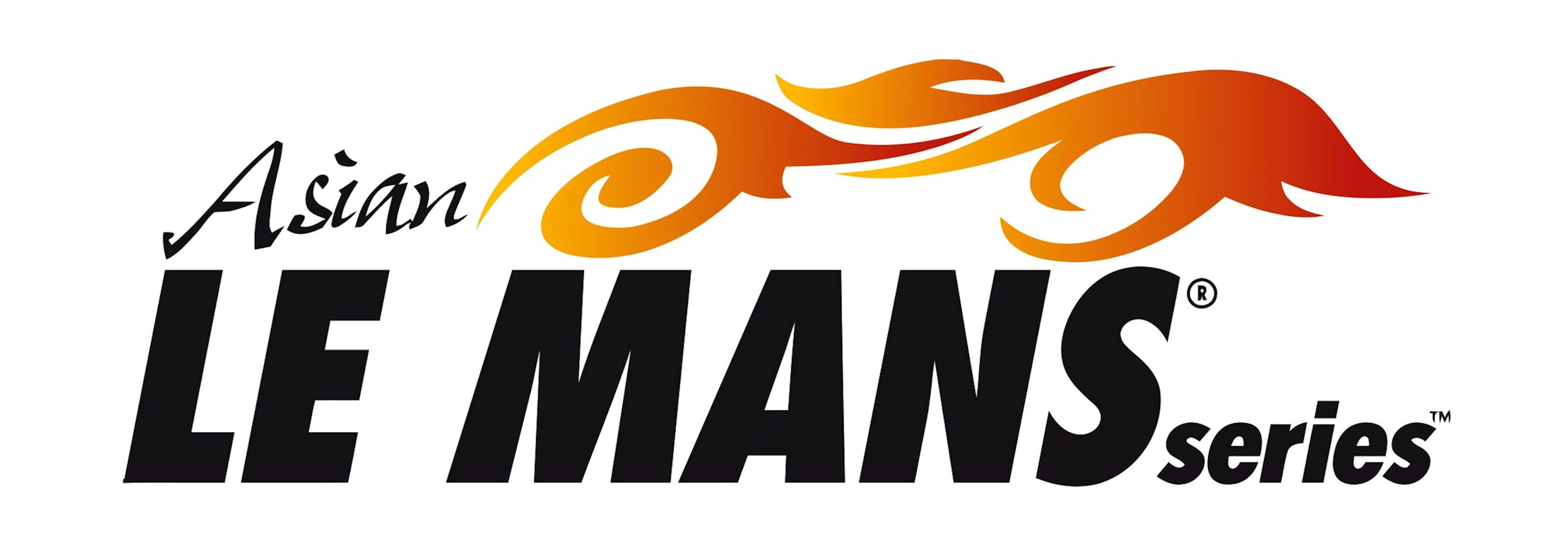
Former official logo of the Asian Le Mans Series used from 2009 until the end of the 2015–16 season

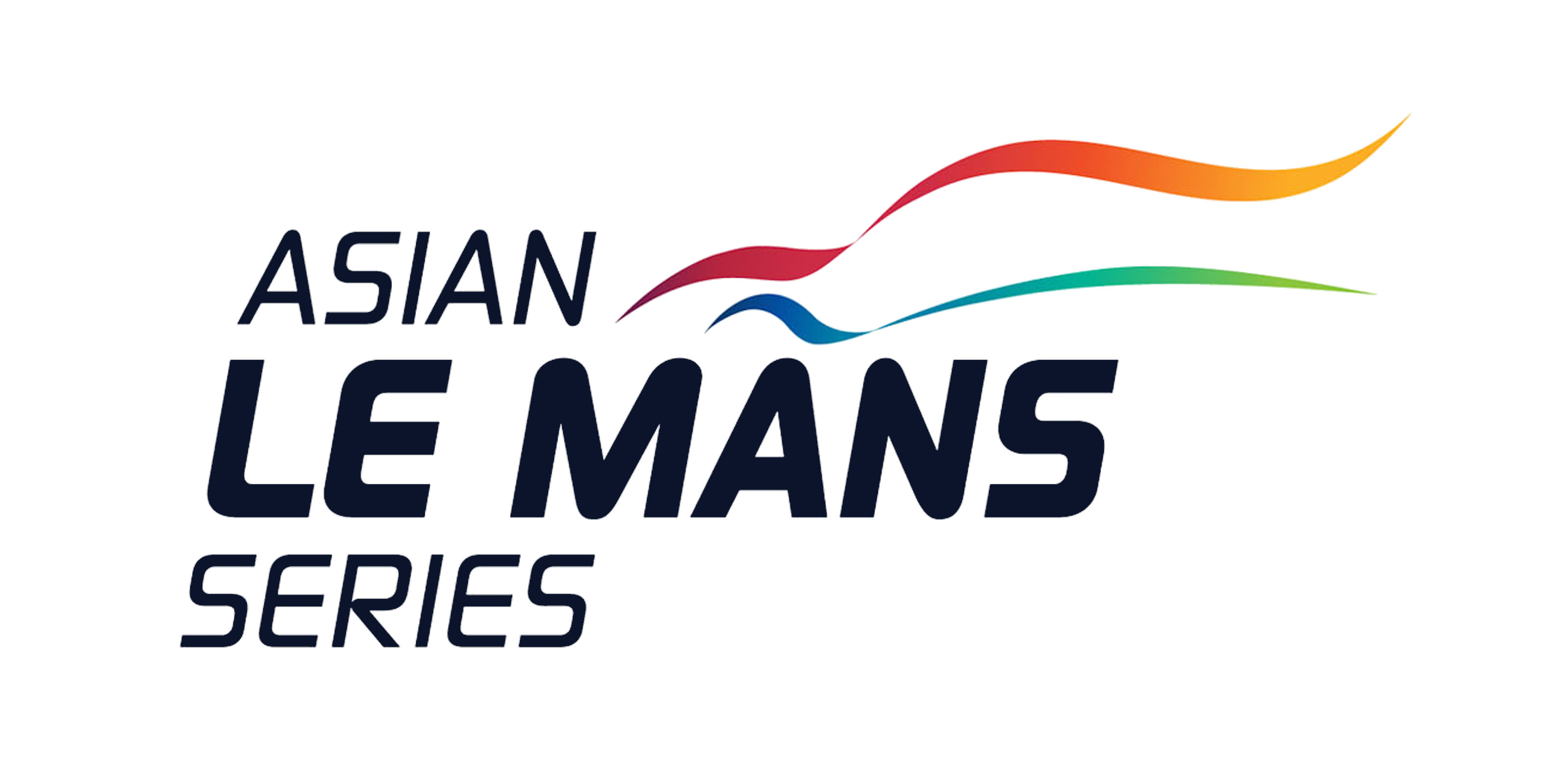
Former official logo of the Asian Le Mans Series used from the 2016–17 season until the end of the 2025–26 season

Current official logo of the Asian Le Mans Series in use since the 2026–27 season

== Format ==
The relaunched Asian Le Mans series had very similar rules to the European Le Mans Series with a total of four classes: LMP2, LMPC, GTC, and GTC Am.

Compared to its running in 2009 the LMP1 and LMGT1 categories was dropped. The GTC class is opened to GT3 category cars in addition to Super GT series GT300 teams. All classes follow a "Pro-Am" categorization with each car requiring at least one amateur-rated driver, and each car must have at least one driver of Asian nationality. The season champions of LMP2 and GTC receive an invitation to the following year's 24 Hours of Le Mans. Michelin is the sole tire supplier for the series.

In the 2013 season the SGT class was opened exclusively for all teams in GT300 class of Super GT. It used the same vehicle regulation of Super GT and counted towards the GT300 championship. This class only participated at the 2013 3 Hours of Fuji.

On 20 April 2013, changes were made to the class structure for grand touring. GTC remained open to FIA GT3 category cars while GTC Am was introduced as a trophy to gentleman drivers and teams that competed from Lamborghini Super Trofeo, Porsche Carrera Cup Asia, Ferrari Challenge Asia-Pacific, Audi R8 LMS Cup Asia, and Lotus Cup Asia. The class was renamed GT Am the following season.

For the 2014 season, Group CN was admitted into the series replacing the entry-less LMPC class from 2013. The grand tourer classes including LM GTE, GTC, and Super GT300 were merged into a single GT class. Driver requirements to include one driver from Asia were expanded to include any nationality from the Australasia region.

In 2015 the season format was changed to a winter one spanning two calendar years. The LMP3 class was added and the GT class was split in GT and GT Am.

In the 2016–17 season the GT Cup class replaced GT Am.

In the 2017–18 season CN was dropped and GT Am was back.

In the 2018–19 season the new LMP2 cars homologated after the ACO's 2017 regulations were eligible for the LMP2 class and the earlier LMP2 cars were eligible for the new LMP2 Am class.

The GT Cup class would be dropped in the 2019–20 season.

ACO's Generation II 2020 Regulation Built LMP3 Cars from manufacturers such as Ligier, ADESS, Ginetta & Duqueine Engineering were now eligible in the series starting in the 2021 season. The calendar would also return to an annual format instead of spanning two calendar years since back in the 2015–16 season due to the ongoing COVID-19 pandemic.

In the 2023 season of the Asian Le Mans Series, a bronze pro-am rated driver would be mandatory in each class for the first time. Therefore the LMP2 Am & GT Am Classes would officially be dropped.

The 2023–24 Asian Le Mans Series season began with a double header at the Sepang International Circuit. With motorsport in the South East Asia region reigniting after the effects of traveling and freight during the COVID-19 Pandemic, now is the time to bring the Asian Le Mans Series back to its traditional home to countries across throughout Asia. The return of Sepang to the calendar saw the season expanded to five races, with the hugely popular races at Dubai Autodrome and Yas Marina Circuit also featured.

The 2026–27 Asian Le Mans Series marked the debut of the Hypercar class for non-factory privateer entries with pro-am rated drivers. Due to the ongoing Iranian War in the Middle East with booking and logistics issues the Asian Le Mans Series will travel over to host races in Europe for the first time with it being branded itself as the Winter Le Mans Series due to being held in the winter season. It will also have a new support category to be created and known as the Asian Le Mans Cup for LMP3 & GT3 class cars like its European Le Mans Cup counterpart resulting in the removal of the LMP3 class in the Asian Le Mans Series since being in the category in the 2015–16 season. GT Class has officially been renamed to GT3 before 2026-27 season.

== Races ==
Throughout the course of the category of the Asian Le Mans Series since it was inaugurated in the 2009 1000 km of Okayama race event and after it was revived in 2013, it has held races on 10 different circuit venues across 7 countries. The Series would hold its first race outside the continent of Asia with the 4 Hours of The Bend race at The Bend Motorsport Park in Australia during the 2019–20 Asian Le Mans Series season. It would also hold races in the category as well for the first time venturing in the Middle East starting in the 2021 Asian Le Mans Series season with the 4 Hours of Dubai at Dubai Autodrome and 4 Hours of Abu Dhabi at Yas Marina Circuit.

=== Current races (2026–27) ===
Race	Circuit	Seasons
4 Hours of Le Castellet	(France) Circuit Paul Ricard	2026
4 Hours of Jerez	(Spain) Circuito de Jerez	2027
4 Hours of Portimão	(Portugal) Algarve International Circuit	2027

=== Former races ===
Race	Circuit	Seasons
1000 km of Okayama	(Japan) Okayama International Circuit	2009
3 Hours of Inje	(South Korea) Inje Speedium	2013–2014
4 Hours of Fuji	(Japan) Fuji Speedway	2013–2018
4 Hours of Zhuhai	(China) Zhuhai International Circuit	2013, 2016–2017
4 Hours of Sepang	(Malaysia) Sepang International Circuit	2013–2020, 2023–2025
4 Hours of Shanghai	(China) Shanghai International Circuit	2014, 2018–2019
4 Hours of Buriram	(Thailand) Chang International Circuit	2016–2020
4 Hours of The Bend	(Australia) The Bend Motorsport Park	2020
4 Hours of Dubai	(United Arab Emirates) Dubai Autodrome	2021–2026
4 Hours of Abu Dhabi	(United Arab Emirates) Yas Marina Circuit	2021–2026

== Champions ==
=== Drivers ===
Season	Category					
2009	LMP1	LMP2	GT1	GT2		
2009	(France) Christophe Tinseau (Japan) Shinji Nakano	(France) Jacques Nicolet (France) Matthieu Lahaye (Monaco) Richard Hein	(Japan) Atsushi Yogo (Japan) Hiroyuki Iiri	(Germany) Dominik Farnbacher (Denmark) Allan Simonsen		
2013	LMP2	GTE	GTC			
2013	(China) David Cheng	(Japan) Naoki Yokomizo (Japan) Akira Iida (Japan) Shogo Mitsuyama	(Italy) Andrea Bertolini (Italy) Michele Rugolo (Australia) Steve Wyatt			
2014	LMP2	CN	GT			
2014	(China) David Cheng (China) Ho-Pin Tung	(Macau) Kevin Tse	(Taiwan) Jun San Chen (Japan) Tatsuya Tanigawa			
2015–16	LMP2	LMP3	CN	GT	GT Am	
2015–16	(Switzerland) Nicolas Leutwiler	(China) David Cheng (China) Ho-Pin Tung	(Singapore) Denis Lian (Switzerland) Giorgio Maggi	(Singapore) Weng Sun Mok (United Kingdom) Rob Bell (Japan) Keita Sawa	(Hong Kong) Paul Ip	
2016–17	LMP2	LMP3	CN	GT	GT Cup	
2016–17	(Italy) Andrea Roda	(United Kingdom) Nigel Moore (United Kingdom) Phil Hanson	(Japan) Kenji Abe (Japan) Akihiro Asai (China) Qin Tianqi (Thailand) Tira Sosothikul (Thailand) Medhapan Sundaradeja	(Italy) Michele Rugolo	(Japan) Takuma Aoki (Japan) Shinyo Sano	
2017–18	LMP2	LMP3	GT	GT Am	GT Cup	
2017–18	(United Kingdom) Harrison Newey (Monaco) Stéphane Richelmi (France) Thomas Laurent	(United States) Guy Cosmo (United States) Patrick Byrne	(Finland) Jesse Krohn (Taiwan) Jun-San Chen	(Italy) Max Wiser (China) Weian Chen	(New Zealand) Will Bamber (New Zealand) Graeme Dowsett	
2018–19	LMP2	LMP2 Am	LMP3	GT	GT Am	GT Cup
2018–19	(United Kingdom) Paul di Resta (United Kingdom) Phil Hanson	(China) Kang Ling (United Kingdom) Darren Burke (Slovakia) Miro Konopka	(Poland) Jakub Śmiechowski (Germany) Martin Hippe	(United Kingdom) James Calado (Japan) Kei Cozzolino (Japan) Takeshi Kimura	(Italy) Max Wiser	(France) Philippe Descombes (Denmark) Benny Simonsen
2019–20	LMP2	LMP2 Am	LMP3	GT	GT Am	
2019–20	(United States) James French (Russia) Roman Rusinov (Netherlands) Leonard Hoogenboom	(United States) Cody Ware	(United Kingdom) Colin Noble (United Kingdom) Tony Wells	(Brazil) Marcos Gomes	(China) Li Lin (China) Zhiwei Lu	
2021	LMP2	LMP2 Am	LMP3	GT	GT Am	
2021	(Austria) René Binder (Austria) Ferdinand von Habsburg (China) Yifei Ye	(Greece) Andreas Laskaratos (United States) Dwight Merriman (United Kingdom) Kyle Tilley	(United Kingdom) Wayne Boyd (Venezuela) Manuel Maldonado (Finland) Rory Penttinen	(Germany) Ralf Bohn (Germany) Alfred Renauer (Germany) Robert Renauer	(Germany) Christian Hook (Finland) Patrick Kujala (Germany) Manuel Lauck	
2022	LMP2	LMP2 Am	LMP3	GT	GT Am	
2022	(United Kingdom) Matt Bell (United Kingdom) Ben Hanley (United States) Rodrigo Sales	(Switzerland) David Droux (Switzerland) Sébastien Page (France) Eric Trouillet	(France) Christophe Cresp (France) Antoine Doquin (France) Steven Palette	(United Kingdom) Ben Barnicoat (United States) Brendan Iribe (United Kingdom) Ollie Millroy	(Canada) Mikaël Grenier (United Kingdom) Ian Loggie (Germany) Valentin Pierburg	
2023	LMP2	LMP3	GT			
2023	(Republic of Ireland) Charlie Eastwood (Turkey) Ayhancan Güven (Turkey) Salih Yoluç	(France) François Hériau (Spain) Xavier Lloveras (France) Fabrice Rossello	(Netherlands) Nicky Catsburg (United States) Chandler Hull (United States) Thomas Merrill			
2023–24	LMP2	LMP3	GT			
2023–24	(United States) George Kurtz (Denmark) Malthe Jakobsen (United States) Colin Braun	(Saint Kitts and Nevis) Alexander Bukhantsov (United Kingdom) James Winslow	(Saint Kitts and Nevis) Alex Malykhin (Germany) Joel Sturm (Austria) Klaus Bachler			
2024–25	LMP2	LMP3	GT			
2024–25	(Denmark) Malthe Jakobsen (Denmark) Michael Jensen (Italy) Valerio Rinicella	(Denmark) Jens Reno Møller (Denmark) Theodor Jensen	(Hong Kong) Antares Au (Germany) Joel Sturm (Austria) Klaus Bachler			
2025–26	LMP2	LMP3	GT			
2025–26	(Switzerland) Louis Delétraz (Denmark) Malthe Jakobsen (United States) George Kurtz	(United States) Alexander Jacoby (France) Paul Lanchère (Switzerland) Kévin Rabin	(United States) Dustin Blattner (United Kingdom) Chris Lulham (Germany) Dennis Marschall			

=== Teams ===
Season	Category					
2009	LMP1	LMP2	GT1	GT2		
2009	(France) Sora Racing	OAK Racing/Team Mazda France	(Japan) JLOC	(Germany) Hankook Team Farnbacher		
2013	LMP2	GTE	GTC			
2013	(France) OAK Racing	(Japan) Team Taisan Ken Endless	(Italy) AF Corse			
2014	LMP2	CN	GT			
2014	(France) OAK Racing	(Hong Kong) Craft-Bamboo Racing	(Taiwan) AAI-Rstrada			
2015–16	LMP2	LMP3	CN	GT	GT Am	
2015–16	(Switzerland) Race Performance	(China) DC Racing	(Singapore) Avelon Formula	(Singapore) Clearwater Racing	(Hong Kong) KCMG	
2016–17	LMP2	LMP3	CN	GT	GT Cup	
2016–17	(Portugal) Algarve Pro Racing	(United Kingdom) Tockwith Motorsports	(Finland) PS Racing	(Hong Kong) DH Racing	(Japan) TKS	
2017–18	LMP2	LMP3	GT	GT Am	GT Cup	
2017–18	(China) Jackie Chan DC Racing X Jota	(China) Jackie Chan DC Racing X Jota	(Taiwan) Fist Team AAI	(China) TianShi Racing Team	(New Zealand) Team NZ	
2018–19	LMP2	LMP2 Am	LMP3	GT	GT Am	GT Cup
2018–19	(United States) United Autosports	(Slovakia) ARC Bratislava	(Poland) Inter Europol Competition	(Japan) Car Guy Racing	(China) Tianshi Racing Team	(Hong Kong) Modena Motorsports
2019–20	LMP2	LMP2 Am	LMP3	GT	GT Am	
2019–20	(Russia) G-Drive Racing with Algarve	(United States) Rick Ware Racing	(United Kingdom) Nielsen Racing	(Taiwan) HubAuto Corsa	(China) Astro Veloce Motorsport	
2021	LMP2	LMP2 Am	LMP3	GT	GT Am	
2021	(Russia) G-Drive Racing	(United Kingdom) Era Motorsport	(United Kingdom) United Autosports	(Germany) Precote Herberth Motorsport	(Germany) Rinaldi Racing	
2022	LMP2	LMP2 Am	LMP3	GT	GT Am	
2022	(United Kingdom) Nielsen Racing	(France) Graff Racing	(Spain) CD Sport	(United Kingdom) Inception Racing with Optimum Motorsport	(Germany) SPS Automotive	
2023	LMP2	LMP3	GT			
2023	(Luxembourg) DKR Engineering	(France) Graff Racing	(Germany) Walkenhorst Motorsport			
2023–24	LMP2	LMP3	GT			
2023–24	(Portugal) CrowdStrike by APR	(Switzerland) Cool Racing	(Lithuania) Pure Rxcing			
2024–25	LMP2	LMP3	GT			
2024–25	(Portugal) Algarve Pro Racing	(Czech Republic) Bretton Racing	(Germany) Manthey Racing			
2025–26	LMP2	LMP3	GT			
2025–26	(United States) CrowdStrike Racing by APR	(Switzerland) CLX Motorsport	(Switzerland) Kessel Racing			

== See also ==
- FIA World Endurance Championship
- European Le Mans Series
- Le Mans Cup
- IMSA SportsCar Championship
- 24 Hours of Le Mans
