= Alexander Jacoby =

Brazilian and American racing driver (born 2009)

- Jacoby (middle) at Silverstone Circuit in 2026
- Nationality: (Brazil) Brazilian (United States) American
- Born: 27 May 2009 (age 17) Washington, D.C., U.S.

European Le Mans Series career
- Debut season: 2026
- Current team: CLX Motorsport
- Categorisation: FIA Silver
- Car number: 17
- Starts: 4
- Wins: 2
- Podiums: 2
- Poles: 0
- Fastest laps: 0
- Best finish: 1st (LMP3) in 2026

Previous series
- 2025–26 2025 2024–2025: Asian Le Mans Series; Eurocup-4 Spanish Winter Championship; F4 Spanish Championship

Championship titles
- 2026 2025–26: European Le Mans Series – LMP3; Asian Le Mans Series – LMP3

Alexander Jacoby (born 27 May 2009) is a Brazilian and American racing driver who last competed in the European Le Mans Series and the Le Mans Cup for CLX Motorsport.

Jacoby is a member of A14 Management, overseen by two-time Formula One world champion Fernando Alonso.

== Personal life ==
Jacoby was born in Washington, D.C. in 2009, but grew up in Sweden and Singapore before moving back stateside in 2017. His father Stefan is a German businessman, who served as the CEO of Mitsubishi Motors Europe from 2001 to 2004, Volkswagen America from 2007 to 2010, Volvo from 2010 to 2012, and has been working for General Motors as its vice president for international operations since 2013. His mother Roberta is from Brazil.

Jacoby holds Brazilian, American and German passports.

== Career ==
Jacoby discovered karting in 2017 while living in Singapore, started his competitive career in 2019 and remained in the discipline until 2023. Starting out in micro karts, Jacoby won the 2020 Rotax Stars & Stripes Trophy Series, before finishing runner-up in the 2021 Rotax US Trophy Series East Mini standings and earning himself an invitation to the RMC Grand Finals. Moving up to junior karts for the following two seasons, Jacoby clinched runner-up honours in the 2022 US Eastern Rotax Championship, as well as finishing ninth in the following year's SKUSA SuperNationals in X30 Junior.

After an extensive testing programme with GRS Team starting from November 2023, Jacoby stepped up to the F4 Spanish Championship with the team in 2024, but was forced to miss the first round as he was yet to turn 15. In the remaining six rounds, Jacoby scored a best result of 19th in race two at Algarve as he ended the year 40th in the overall standings. Towards the end of the year, Jacoby also made a one-off appearance in the F4 Brazilian Championship for Oakberry Bassani F4 at the Interlagos finale, in which he scored a best result of tenth in race two. In 2025, Jacoby joined Monlau Motorsport to compete in both the Eurocup-4 Spanish Winter Championship and the F4 Spanish Championship. In the former, Jacoby scored a best result of 12th at Jerez to take 23rd in points, whereas in the main season, he took a best result of 14th at Le Castellet and Valencia to end the season 30th overall.

In late 2025, Jacoby began testing LMP3 machinery for CLX Motorsport, ahead of his endurance debut in the 2025–26 Asian Le Mans Series, where he drove alongside Paul Lanchère and Kévin Rabin. In the six-race season, Jacoby took wins at Sepang and Abu Dhabi en route to the LMP3 title, despite retiring in the finale. Continuing with CLX for the rest of 2026, Jacoby raced in the European Le Mans Series and Le Mans Cup. Between the two campaigns, Jacoby found more success in ELMS, where he was initially paired up with Lanchère and Bruno Ribeiro, but after a quiet start to the season, Louis Iglesias replaced Ribeiro and led them to victory at Imola and Spa, the latter following a disqualification for Rinaldi Racing. After that, Jacoby finished second at Silverstone and won at Algarve to seal the ELMS LMP3 title.

== Karting record ==
=== Karting career summary ===
Season	Series	Team	Position
2020	Rotax Stars & Stripes Trophy Series — Micro Max		1st
2021	Rotax US Trophy Series East — Mini Max		1st
2021	RMC Grand Finals — Mini Max	J3 Competition	66th
2022	US Eastern Rotax Championship — Junior Max		2nd
2022	Rotax Max Euro Trophy — Junior Max	J3 Competition	
2023	SKUSA SuperNationals — X30 Junior	U-Race	9th
2023	SKUSA SuperNationals — KA 100 Junior	U-Race	36th

== Racing record ==
=== Racing career summary ===
Season	Series	Team	Races	Wins	Poles	F/Laps	Podiums	Points	Position
2024	F4 Spanish Championship	GRS Team	18	0	0	0	0	0	40th
2024	F4 Brazilian Championship	Oakberry Bassani F4	3	0	0	0	0	0	17th
2025	Eurocup-4 Spanish Winter Championship	Monlau Motorsport	9	0	0	0	0	0	23rd
2025	F4 Spanish Championship	Monlau Motorsport	21	0	0	0	0	0	30th
2025–26	Asian Le Mans Series – LMP3	CLX Motorsport	6	2	0	0	4	96	**1st**
2026	Le Mans Cup – LMP3	CLX Motorsport	6	0	0	0	0	3	26th
2026	European Le Mans Series – LMP3	CLX Motorsport	6	3	3	2	4	110	**1st**

^{†} As Jacoby was a guest driver, he was ineligible to score points.

=== Complete F4 Spanish Championship results ===
(key) (Races in bold indicate pole position) (Races in italics indicate fastest lap)

Year	Team	1	2	3	4	5	6	7	8	9	10	11	12	13	14	15	16	17	18	19	20	21	DC	Points
2024	GRS Team	JAR; 1	JAR; 2	JAR; 3	POR; 1; 22	POR; 2; 19	POR; 3; 30	LEC; 1; 29	LEC; 2; 27	LEC; 3 Ret	ARA; 1 Ret	ARA; 2; 31	ARA; 3; 31	CRT; 1; 29†	CRT; 2; 26	CRT; 3; 26	JER; 1 Ret	JER; 2; 23	JER; 3; 28	CAT; 1; 31†	CAT; 2; 23	CAT; 3; 28	40th	0
2025	Monlau Motorsport	ARA; 1; 33	ARA; 2; 24	ARA; 3; 25	NAV; 1 Ret	NAV; 2; 16	NAV; 3; 15	POR; 1; 17	POR; 2; 25	POR; 3; 31†	LEC; 1 Ret	LEC; 2; 24	LEC; 3; 14	JER; 1; 21	JER; 2; 18	JER; 3; 19	CRT; 1 Ret	CRT; 2; 14	CRT; 3; 32	CAT; 1; 26	CAT; 2; 30	CAT; 3; 25	30th	0

=== Complete Eurocup-4 Spanish Winter Championship results ===
(key) (Races in bold indicate pole position; races in italics indicate fastest lap)

Year	Team	1	2	3	4	5	6	7	8	9	DC	Points
2025	Monlau Motorsport	JER; 1; 32†	JER; 2; 24	JER; 3; 12	POR; 1; 17	POR; 2; 24	POR; 3; 13	NAV; 1; 27	NAV; 2; 26	NAV; 3; 19	23rd	0

=== Complete Asian Le Mans Series results ===
(key) (Races in bold indicate pole position) (Races in italics indicate fastest lap)

Year	Team	Class	Car	Engine	1	2	3	4	5	6	Pos.	Points
2025–26	CLX Motorsport	LMP3	Ligier JS P325	Toyota V35A 3.5 L V6	**SEP**; **1**; 3	**SEP**; **2**; 1	**DUB**; **1**; 5	**DUB**; **2**; 3	**ABU**; **1**; 1	**ABU**; **2** Ret	1st	96

=== Complete Le Mans Cup results ===
(key) (Races in bold indicate pole position; results in italics indicate fastest lap)

Year	Entrant	Class	Chassis	1	2	3	4	5	6	Rank	Points
2026	CLX Motorsport	LMP3	Ligier JS P325	BAR; Ret	LEC; Ret	LMS; Ret	SPA; 11	SIL; 10	POR; 9	26th	3

^{*} Season still in progress.

=== Complete European Le Mans Series results ===
(key) (Races in bold indicate pole position; results in italics indicate fastest lap)

Year	Entrant	Class	Chassis	Engine	1	2	3	4	5	6	Rank	Points
2026	CLX Motorsport	LMP3	Ligier JS P325	Toyota V35A 3.5 L V6	CAT; 8	LEC; 5	IMO; 1	SPA; 1	SIL; 2	ALG; 1	1st	110

^{*} Season still in progress.
