= 4 Hours of Abu Dhabi =

Sports car endurance race in United Arab Emirates

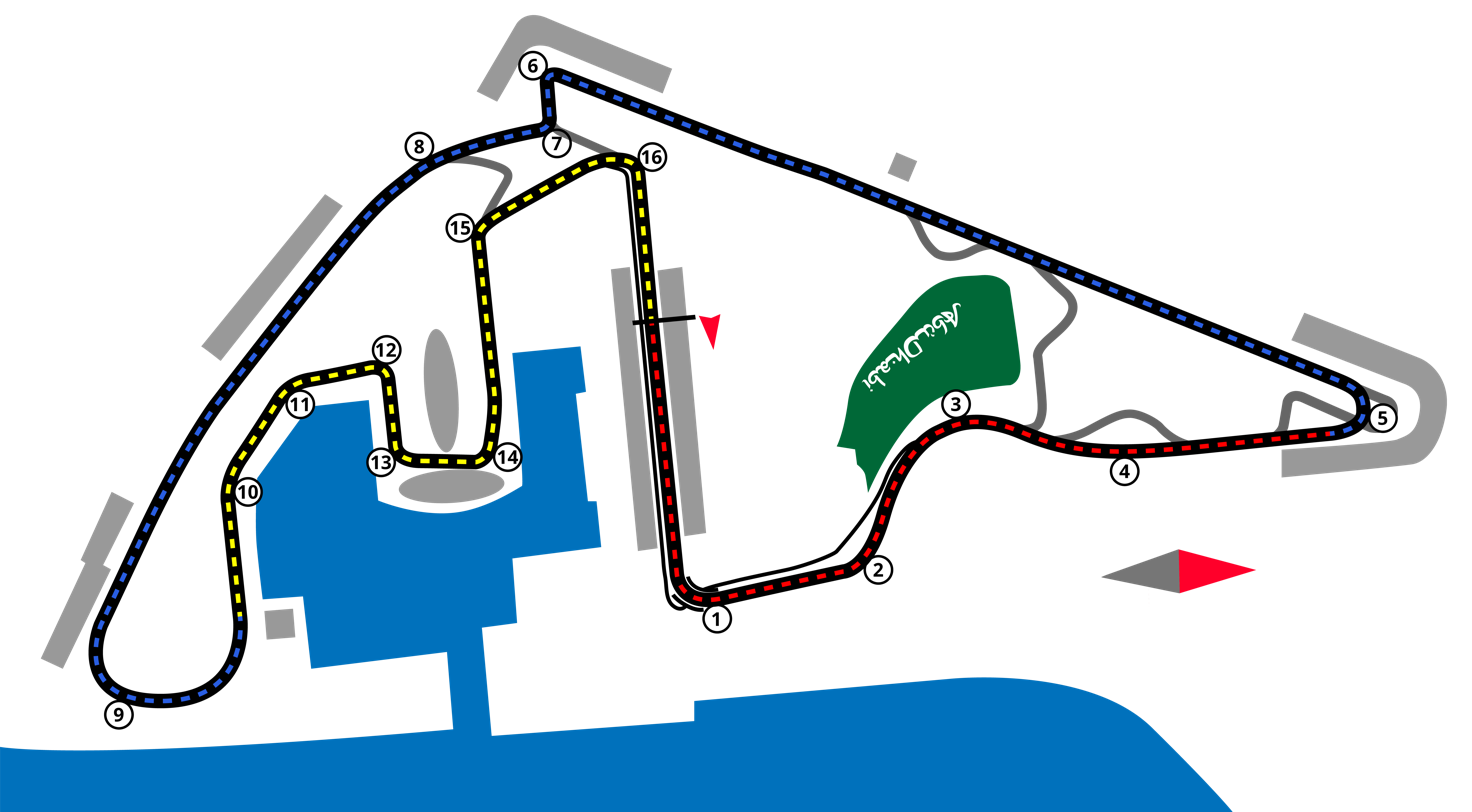

Asian Le Mans Series
- Venue: Yas Marina Circuit
- First race: 2021
- Last race: 2026
- Duration: 4 hours
- Most wins (driver): (Denmark) Malthe Jakobsen (4)
- Most wins (team): (Portugal) Algarve Pro Racing (4)
- Most wins (manufacturer): Oreca (12)

The 4 Hours of Abu Dhabi is an endurance race for sports cars held at Yas Marina Circuit in Yas Island, Abu Dhabi, United Arab Emirates.

== Results ==
Year	Overall winner(s)	Entrant	Car	Duration	Race title	Championship	Report	Ref
2021 (Race 1)	(United Kingdom) Tom Blomqvist (Indonesia) Sean Gelael	(United Kingdom) Jota	Oreca 07	4:02:12	4 Hours of Abu Dhabi	Asian Le Mans Series	report	
2021 (Race 2)	(United Kingdom) Tom Blomqvist (Indonesia) Sean Gelael	(United Kingdom) Jota	Oreca 07	4:03:34	4 Hours of Abu Dhabi	Asian Le Mans Series	report	
2022 (Race 1)	(United States) Josh Pierson (United Kingdom) Paul di Resta	(United Kingdom) United Autosports	Oreca 07	4:03:07	4 Hours of Abu Dhabi	Asian Le Mans Series	report	
2022 (Race 2)	(United States) Josh Pierson (United Kingdom) Paul di Resta	(United Kingdom) United Autosports	Oreca 07	4:03:14	4 Hours of Abu Dhabi	Asian Le Mans Series	report	
2023 (Race 1)	(Switzerland) Alexandre Coigny (Denmark) Malthe Jakobsen	(Switzerland) Cool Racing	Oreca 07	4:03:13	4 Hours of Abu Dhabi	Asian Le Mans Series	report	
2023 (Race 2)	(Turkey) Salih Yoluç (United Kingdom) Charlie Eastwood (Turkey) Ayhancan Güven	(Luxembourg) DKR Engineering	Oreca 07	4:02:36	4 Hours of Abu Dhabi	Asian Le Mans Series	report	
2024 (Race 1)	(United States) George Kurtz (United States) Colin Braun (Denmark) Malthe Jakobsen	(Portugal) CrowdStrike Racing by APR	Oreca 07	4:00:48	4 Hours of Abu Dhabi	Asian Le Mans Series	report	
2024 (Race 2)	(United States) Chris McMurry (United Kingdom) Freddie Tomlinson (United Kingdom) Toby Sowery	(Portugal) Algarve Pro Racing	Oreca 07	4:00:40	4 Hours of Abu Dhabi	Asian Le Mans Series	report	
2025 (Race 1)	(Denmark) Malthe Jakobsen (Denmark) Michael Jensen (Italy) Valerio Rinicella	(Portugal) Algarve Pro Racing	Oreca 07	4:31:21 (Note: The race was extended by 30 minutes due to an early red flag stoppage.)	4 Hours of Abu Dhabi	Asian Le Mans Series	report	
2025 (Race 2)	(France) François Perrodo (Italy) Alessio Rovera (France) Matthieu Vaxivière	(Italy) AF Corse	Oreca 07	4:37:55	4 Hours of Abu Dhabi	Asian Le Mans Series	report	
2026 (Race 1)	(Switzerland) Louis Delétraz (Denmark) Malthe Jakobsen (United States) George Kurtz	(United States) CrowdStrike Racing by APR	Oreca 07	4:01:39.058	4 Hours of Abu Dhabi	Asian Le Mans Series	report	
2026 (Race 2)	(Germany) Alexander Mattschull (Switzerland) Mathias Beche (Australia) Griffin Peebles	(Luxembourg) DKR Engineering	Oreca 07	4:00:52.297	4 Hours of Abu Dhabi	Asian Le Mans Series	report	

=== Records ===
==== Wins by constructor ====
Rank	Constructor	Wins	Years
1	(France) Oreca	12	2021 (Race 1)–2026 (Race 2)

==== Wins by engine manufacturer ====
Rank	Constructor	Wins	Years
1	(United Kingdom) Gibson	12	2021 (Race 1)–2026 (Race 2)

==== Drivers with multiple wins ====
Rank	Driver	Wins	Years
1	(Denmark) Malthe Jakobsen	4	2023 (Race 1), 2024 (Race 1), 2025 (Race 1), 2026 (Race 1)
2	(United Kingdom) Tom Blomqvist	2	2021 (Race 1)–2021 (Race 2)
2	(Indonesia) Sean Gelael	2	2021 (Race 1)–2021 (Race 2)
2	(United States) Josh Pierson	2	2022 (Race 1)–2022 (Race 2)
2	(United Kingdom) Paul di Resta	2	2022 (Race 1)–2022 (Race 2)
2	(United States) George Kurtz	2	2024 (Race 1), 2026 (Race 1)
