= 4 Hours of Dubai =

Sports car endurance race in United Arab Emirates

Asian Le Mans Series
- Venue: Dubai Autodrome
- First race: 2021
- Last race: 2025
- Duration: 4 hours
- Most wins (driver): (Austria) René Binder (Austria) Ferdinand Habsburg (China) Yifei Ye (United Kingdom) Matt Bell (United Kingdom) Ben Hanley (United States) Rodrigo Sales (Switzerland) Louis Delétraz (Denmark) Malthe Jakobsen (United States) George Kurtz (2)
- Most wins (team): (Portugal) Algarve Pro Racing (5)
- Most wins (manufacturer): Oreca (9)

The 4 Hours of Dubai is an endurance race for sports cars held at Dubai Autodrome in Dubai, United Arab Emirates.

== History ==
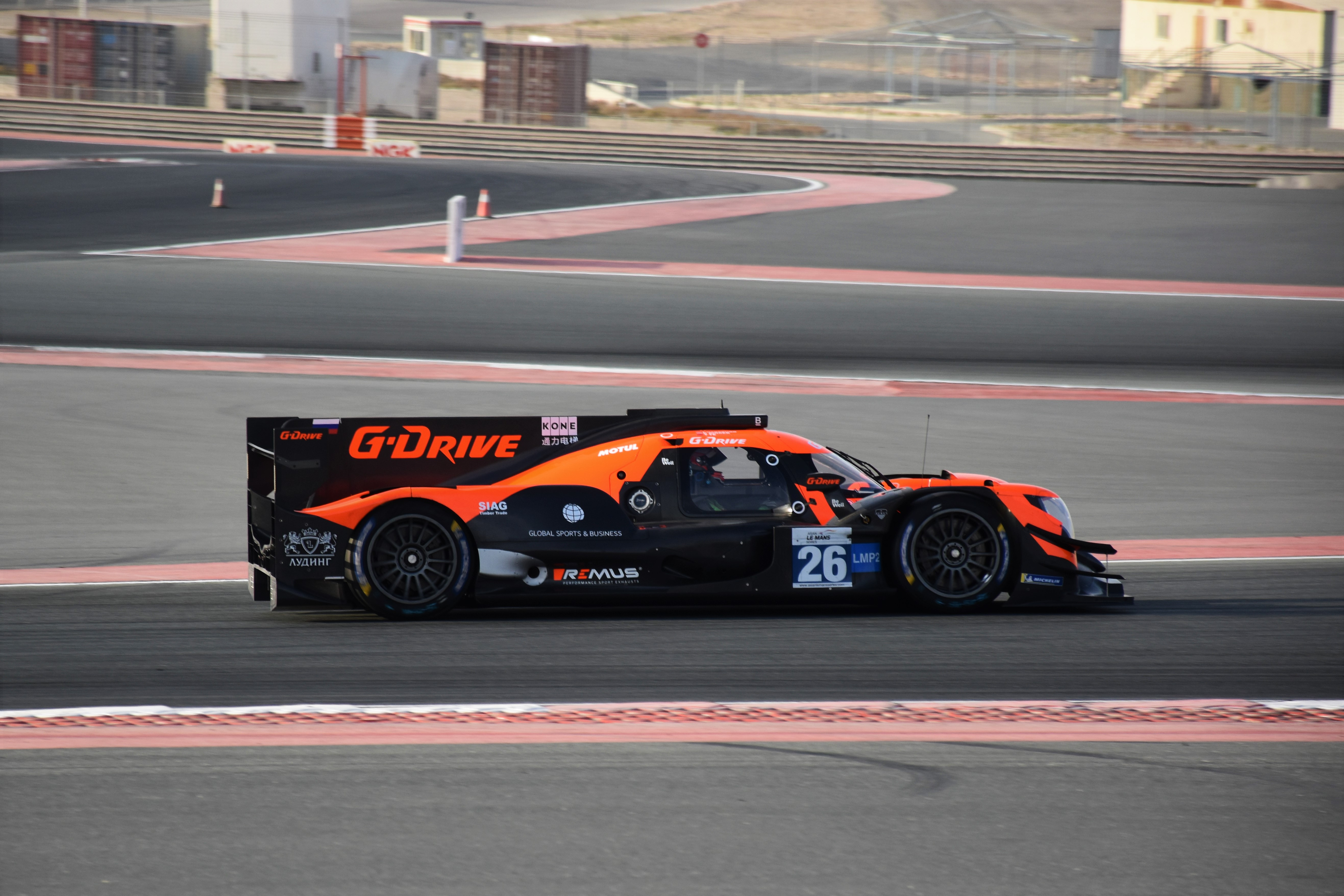
René Binder in the #26 G-Drive Racing Aurus 01-Gibson at the 2021 4 Hours of Dubai

Due to the COVID-19 pandemic, the 2021 Asian Le Mans Series season was run entirely in the United Arab Emirates. On January 13, 2021, the schedule was revised with Dubai Autodrome added with a double-header weekend. This was done to reduce isolation times due to travel restrictions in the UAE. The race has remained on the calendar since then and has been run twice per Asian Le Mans Series season for all but one year.

== Results ==
Year	Overall winner(s)	Entrant	Car	Duration	Championship	Report	Ref
2021 (Race 1)	(Austria) René Binder (Austria) Ferdinand Habsburg (China) Yifei Ye	(Russia) G-Drive Racing	Aurus 01	4:02:26	Asian Le Mans Series	report	
2021 (Race 2)	(Austria) René Binder (Austria) Ferdinand Habsburg (China) Yifei Ye	(Russia) G-Drive Racing	Aurus 01	4:03:13	Asian Le Mans Series	report	
2022 (Race 1)	(United Kingdom) Matt Bell (United Kingdom) Ben Hanley (United States) Rodrigo Sales	(United Kingdom) Nielsen Racing	Oreca 07	4:03:07	Asian Le Mans Series	report	
2022 (Race 2)	(United Kingdom) Matt Bell (United Kingdom) Ben Hanley (United States) Rodrigo Sales	(United Kingdom) Nielsen Racing	Oreca 07	4:02:00	Asian Le Mans Series	report	
2023 (Race 1)	(Australia) James Allen (United States) John Falb (Barbados) Kyffin Simpson	(Portugal) Algarve Pro Racing	Oreca 07	4:03:08	Asian Le Mans Series	report	
2023 (Race 2)	(United States) Nolan Siegel (United States) Christian Bogle (United States) Charles Crews	(Poland) Inter Europol Competition	Oreca 07	4:03:13	Asian Le Mans Series	report	
2024	(Oman) Ahmad Al Harthy; Nikita Mazepin (Switzerland) Louis Delétraz	(Jordan) 99 Racing	Oreca 07	4:01:25	Asian Le Mans Series	report	
2025 (Race 1)	(Denmark) Malthe Jakobsen (Denmark) Michael Jensen (Italy) Valerio Rinicella	(Portugal) Algarve Pro Racing	Oreca 07	4:01:35	Asian Le Mans Series	report	
2025 (Race 2)	(United Kingdom) Olli Caldwell (Greece) Kriton Lendoudis (United Kingdom) Alex Quinn	(Portugal) Algarve Pro Racing	Oreca 07	4:01:18	Asian Le Mans Series	report	
2026 Race 1	(Switzerland) Louis Delétraz (Denmark) Malthe Jakobsen (United States) George Kurtz	(United States) CrowdStrike Racing by APR	Oreca 07	4:01:39	Asian Le Mans Series	Report	
2026 Race 2	(Switzerland) Louis Delétraz (Denmark) Malthe Jakobsen (United States) George Kurtz	(United States) CrowdStrike Racing by APR	Oreca 07	4:01:37	Asian Le Mans Series	Report	

=== Records ===
==== Wins by constructor ====
Rank	Constructor	Wins	Years
1	(France) Oreca	9	2021 (Race 1)–2025 (Race 2)

==== Wins by engine manufacturer ====
Rank	Constructor	Wins	Years
1	(United Kingdom) Gibson	9	2021 (Race 1)–2025 (Race 2)

==== Drivers with multiple wins ====
Rank	Driver	Wins	Years
1	(Austria) René Binder	2	2021 (Race 1)–2021 (Race 2)
1	(Austria) Ferdinand Habsburg	2	2021 (Race 1)–2021 (Race 2)
1	(China) Yifei Ye	2	2021 (Race 1)–2021 (Race 2)
1	(United Kingdom) Matt Bell	2	2022 (Race 1)–2022 (Race 2)
1	(United Kingdom) Ben Hanley	2	2022 (Race 1)–2022 (Race 2)
1	(United States) Rodrigo Sales	2	2022 (Race 1)–2022 (Race 2)
1	(Denmark) Malthe Jakobsen	2	2026 (Race 1)–2026 (Race 2)
1	(Switzerland) Louis Delétraz	2	2026 (Race 1)–2026 (Race 2)
1	(United States) George Kurtz	2	2026 (Race 1)–2026 (Race 2)
