= Asian Le Mans Cup =

Auto racing series in Asia

- Category: Sports car racing
- Region: Asia
- Inaugural season: 2026–27
- Prototype classes: LMP3, LMP3 Pro-Am
- GT classes: GT3
- Official website: Official website

The Asian Le Mans Cup is an Asian sports car racing endurance series created by the Automobile Club de l'Ouest (ACO) and based in Asia. It is a support series for the Asian Le Mans Series.

== History ==
The series was announced at the 2026 24 Hours of Le Mans weekend and will continue running LMP3 cars in Asia after they were removed from the Asian Le Mans Series. It is the first "sub-series" organised in Asia by the ACO/LMEM since the Asian Le Mans Sprint Cup in 2017.

== Format ==
The Asian Le Mans Cup is similar to the Le Mans Cup that races in Europe with both LMP3 and GT3 cars eligible.

== Classes ==
There are two classes for LMP3 cars, LMP3 Pro and LMP3. LMP3 Pro is for FIA Gold and Silver drivers, while LMP3 must have at least one Bronze driver. GT3 also requires one Bronze driver in the line-up. Platinum rated drivers are not eligible to compete in the Asian Le Mans Cup.

== Circuits ==
- (France) Circuit Paul Ricard (2026)
- (Spain) Circuito de Jerez (2027)
- (Portugal) Algarve International Circuit (2027)
