= A1 Team Greece =

- Greece
- Founded: 2006
- Seat holder(s): Stathis Basios
- Team principal: Dimitris Nafpliotis
- Race driver(s): Race: Takis Kaitatzis; Nikos Zachos; Practice and Testing: Stelios Nousias; Vasilis Papafilippou
- First race: 2006-07 Netherlands
- Rounds entered: 2 (4 races)
- Championships: 0
- Sprint race victories: 0
- Feature race victories: 0
- Pole positions: 0
- Fastest laps: 0
- Total points: 0
- 2006–07 position: 24th (0 pts)

A1 Team Greece represented Greece in A1 Grand Prix, an international motor racing series.

== History ==
Stathis Basios was the teams' seat holder, whilst Arena Motorsport managed and operated the team.

The team contested only 2 events in the 2006-07 season. Kaitatzis competed in both races at Zandvoort and the Feature Race in Brno, scoring the teams' best race result of fifteenth in the Feature Race at Zandvoort, whilst Zachos drove in the Sprint Race at Brno. Kaitatzis qualified the car on both occasions. Drivers Stelios Nousias and Vasilis Papafilippou were also given practice laps in Zandvoort.

== Results ==
=== Overview ===
| Name | Seasons | Races (Starts) | A1GP Title | Wins | Sprint wins | Main wins | 2nd | 3rd | Poles | Fastest Laps | Points |
|---|---|---|---|---|---|---|---|---|---|---|---|
| Takis Kaitatzis | 2006–07 | 2 (3) | | | | | | | | | 0 |
| Nikos Zachos | 2006–07 | 1 (1) | | | | | | | | | 0 |

=== Complete A1 Grand Prix results ===
(key)

| Year | Racing team | Chassis, Engine, Tyres | Drivers | 1 | 2 | 3 | 4 | 5 | 6 | 7 | 8 | 9 | 10 | 11 | 12 | 13 | 14 | 15 | 16 | 17 | 18 | 19 | 20 | 21 | 22 | Points | Rank |
|---|---|---|---|---|---|---|---|---|---|---|---|---|---|---|---|---|---|---|---|---|---|---|---|---|---|---|---|
| 2006–07 | Arena Motorsport | Lola, Zytek, Cooper Avon | | (Netherlands) NED | | (Czech Republic) CZE | | (China) BEI | | (Malaysia) MLY | | (Indonesia) INA | | (New Zealand) NZL | | (Australia) AUS | | (South Africa) RSA | | (Mexico) MEX | | (China) SHA | | (United Kingdom) GBR | | 0 | 24th |
| 2006–07 | Arena Motorsport | Lola, Zytek, Cooper Avon | | S | F | S | F | S | F | S | F | S | F | S | F | S | F | S | F | S | F | S | F | S | F | 0 | 24th |
| 2006–07 | Arena Motorsport | Lola, Zytek, Cooper Avon | Takis Kaitatzis | 18 | 15 | | Ret | | | | | | | | | | | | | | | | | | | 0 | 24th |
| 2006–07 | Arena Motorsport | Lola, Zytek, Cooper Avon | Nikos Zachos | | | 19 | | | | | | | | | | | | | | | | | | | | 0 | 24th |
