= 2005 Estoril A1GP round =

2005-06 A1GP of Portugal

Race Details
- Race 3 of 11 in the 2005-06 A1 Grand Prix season
- Date: October 23, 2005
- Location: Autódromo do Estoril; Estoril, Portugal
- Weather: Fine, 20 °C

Qualifying
- Pole: Brazil (Nelson Piquet Jr.)
- Time: 3'01.316 (1'30.561, 1'30.755)

Sprint Race
- 1st: France (Alexandre Premat)
- 2nd: Brazil (Nelson Piquet Jr.)
- 3rd: Switzerland (Neel Jani)

Main Race
- 1st: France (Alexandre Premat)
- 2nd: Switzerland (Neel Jani)
- 3rd: Ireland (Ralph Firman)

Fast Lap
- FL: France (Alexandre Premat)
- Time: 1'31.106, (Lap 23 of Main Race)

Official Classifications
- Prac1 ·Prac2 ·Prac3 ·Qual ·SRace ·MRace

Layout of the Autódromo do Estoril

The 2005–06 A1 Grand Prix of Nations, Portugal was an A1 Grand Prix race, held on the weekend of October 23, 2005 at the Autódromo do Estoril circuit.

== Report ==
=== Practice ===
Friday was affected by inclement weather, which saw the morning test sessions and practice held in wet conditions due to rain. Local star Álvaro Parente set the quickest time in the first test session, one of two additional timed 40 minute runs that allowed teams to obtain the best set ups on their cars. Parente set a time of 1'54.918, but this was soon eclipsed by series leaders Brazil as Nelson Piquet Jr. set a 1'51.916 during the second test.

The track was still slightly damp for the first practice session, but A1 Team France, who won both races in the previous round continued their impressive form with Alexandre Premat setting the fastest time - a 1'33.024. Adrian Sutil, driving for A1 Team Germany came in second in his debut outing, setting a 1'33.700 after 17 laps. Czech driver Tomáš Enge was a mere 0.034 seconds behind, while Australia's Will Davison made a successful return to the car to set the fourth fastest time. The top 5 was rounded out by Brazil, Piquet completing 18 laps on his way to 1'34.085.

The rain returned prior to the commencement of the second practice session, and it was delayed by 25 minutes to allow areas of standing water on the circuit to clear. This ensured that times were considerably slower than in the previous session, but Premat was still able to come out on top, setting a 1'52.037 after just 5 laps to finish over 1.5 seconds ahead of second-placed Piquet. Portugal continued to perform well at home to set the third fastest time, followed by Switzerland and USA. Australia decided not to compete in the session due to their concerns about the track conditions.

Saturday's session saw Czech Republic take top honours, with Brazil still close behind. Great Britain's Robbie Kerr and The Netherlands' Jos Verstappen set the third and fourth fastest times, followed by Germany in 5th. France completed just 8 laps in the session and set the slowest time of the morning, over 17 seconds behind the best.

=== Qualifying ===
A1 Team Brazil took its second A1GP pole position in qualifying, despite driver Piquet spinning out in the first of the four timed sessions. He went on to set times of 1'30.755 and 1'30.561 in his second and fourth runs to secure first position on the grid for the sprint race. Brazil's aggregate time was over half a second quicker than that of Switzerland, who were able to set the second-quickest lap of the session on their fourth run. Enge's aggregate time of 3'01.830 put the Swiss team second on the grid, their best qualifying result so far in the series. France confirmed their position as one of the top teams by taking third spot, followed by the Czech Republic and The Netherlands.

Portugal did not disappoint the home crowd, following on from their impressive times in the weekend's practice sessions to line up 6th, ahead of Canada, Malaysia, Indonesia and Great Britain. Germany were unable to carry their surprisingly quick times from practice to qualifying and will line up 11th. The same occurred for Australia, where Davison will line up from 19th place. Lebanon's Basil Shaaban and India's Armaan Ebrahim will take their places at the very back of the field in 23rd and 24th positions respectively.

=== Sprint race ===
The Sprint Race took place on Sunday, October 23, 2005.

All cars got away cleanly for the parade lap and formed up well for the rolling start, but running very slowly behind the safety car. At the start, Piquet was followed closely by Premat of Team France and Verstappen of Team Netherlands. Piquet chose to brake fairly early into turn 1 and was watching Neel Jani of Team Switzerland on his outside, while allowing the French car to beat him to the apex with the cars running 3-abreast around the bend. Team Great Britain was pushed off the outside of the bend, but was able to rejoin the track in 13th place.

Australia, Mexico, China & Pakistan all retired following a shunt at turn 2 on the first lap.

At this stage in the race, France was in the lead, followed by Brazil, Switzerland, The Netherlands, Czech Republic, Portugal (who passed Canada down the pit straight at the end of lap 1), Canada, Indonesia, Malaysia, South Africa, Italy, Germany, Great Britain, Ireland, USA, New Zealand, Russia, Lebanon, India and Austria. Great Britain was clearly faster than Germany but couldn’t find a way past.

On lap 6, Ralph Firman of Team Ireland got too close to the British car around one of the slow right-hand corners and touched his front wing against its rear-right tyre, puncturing the tyre and destroying the left-hand side of the front wing. The British car went straight off at the next bend and retired from the race while Firman had to pit for a new nose and rejoined the race a lap down. At this stage, the top 3 cars had pulled away from the rest of the field by over 3.5 seconds.

With Great Britain and Ireland out of the way, it was the turn of Scott Speed of Team USA to try to find a way past the slower, German car ahead of him.

By lap 13, Malaysia had passed Indonesia for 8th place after a close battle and Austria had got ahead of India for 17th. In the French car, Alexandre Premat was using his PowerBoosts to try to get the fastest lap and the extra point that goes with it.

On lap 15 Austria and India both passed Lebanon for 16th & 17th places respectively and one lap later Scott Speed managed to get in front of Germany at turn 2, but ran wide at the following corner and lost the place again.

=== Main race ===
The Main Race took place on Sunday, October 23, 2005.

Armaan Ebrahim stalled the Team India car pulling away for the parade lap and the car was pushed back to the pits to be restarted there. One of the Team India engineers came onto the track, but the marshalls quite correctly would not allow him to work on the car until it was in the pit lane.

As the field formed up, Nelson Piquet Jr. had pointed his car directly towards Alexandre Premat and Lebanon were in the wrong grid box, -1 place. Brazil, The Netherlands and Russia all stalled on the grid. France made it into Turn 1 ahead of Portugal, who had made a great start from 6th on the grid. These two were followed by Tomáš Enge of Czech Republic who got ahead of Neel Jani into third place. Jani was running 4th, followed by Indonesia who had managed to move up from 9th to 5th and Italy who had moved up from 6th. Unfortunately, Italy managed this by jumping the start and was penalised for this later in the race. Canada ran wide at turn 1 and dropped two places to 7th. Then came Malaysia, South Africa and Germany. Those two cars had bumped during the run down the pit straight, but both survived.

The safety car was deployed at the end of lap 1, but I don’t know why. All I can assume is that the race officials thought that the 3 stalled cars might not have been moved to the pits by the end of the first lap, so did it as a precaution. The three cars were cleared off the track very quickly and there was no danger, so the safety car returned to the pits at the end of lap 2. While it was on track a number of teams chose to make their compulsory pit stop:- Indonesia, Malaysia, New Zealand, South Africa, Germany, Great Britain, China, Mexico, Pakistan and India. South Africa emerged first following an excellent stop, followed by Germany, Indonesia, Great Britain, Mexico, India, Pakistan and China. Malaysia and New Zealand ran into problems during their stops and took much longer to get back on track.

On lap 3, the race order was France, Portugal, Czech Republic, Switzerland, Italy, Canada, Ireland, USA, Austria, Australia, Lebanon, The Netherlands, South Africa, Germany, Indonesia, Great Britain and Mexico in 17th place. At the end of lap 4, Brazil pitted with no problems and on lap 6 Robbie Kerr managed to overtake Mikola while Neel Jani & Scott Speed both pitted cleanly. On lap 7 Italy was given a drive-through penalty for a jump start. Canada chose to pit at the same time, but problems with the front right wheel caused a delay. When McIntosh emerged from the pits it was behind Salvador Durán. The Canadian tried to get past, but outbraked himself, bumping the Team Mexico car and causing it to spin off.

By the end of lap 10 the complete race order was France, Portugal, Czech Republic, Ireland, Australia, Austria, The Netherlands, Lebanon, Italy, Switzerland *, USA *, Germany *, South Africa *, Great Britain *, Indonesia *, Canada*, India *, China*, Pakistan *, Mexico *, Brazil *, New Zealand *, Russia * & Malaysia *. Teams marked with an asterisk (*) had completed their mandatory pit stop.

On lap 11, Indonesia attempted an ambitious overtaking maneuver, trying to pass Great Britain and South Africa into turn 1. Mikola did get to the apex before the other but could not keep his car on the track and ran wide at the exit of the turn, spinning off. This happened right in front of Tomas Scheckter and Robbie Kerr capitalised on the confusion, passing the South African car into turn 2. After attempting unsuccessfully to recover the car under yellow flags, the safety car was deployed a lap later.

Around this time, last-placed Malaysia was holding up a number of faster cars on track by not yielding when they came to lap him. The lack of blue flags in A1GP allows this to happen. Just before the safety car was deployed, Portugal pitted. While the wheels were changed quickly and without problems, Álvaro Parente stalled the car as he pulled way and when he reached the end of the pit lane and was trying to rejoin the race, he had to steer between two sets of marshalls recovering Mikola’s car.

When the safety car was deployed, the remaining teams chose to make their pit stops:- France, Czech Republic, Ireland, Australia, The Netherlands, Italy and Lebanon. France made a particularly fast stop but Tomáš Enge stalled the Team Czech Republic car. While running under the safety car, the Team South Africa car retired with a mechanical problem.

After the pit stops had been completed, the race order was France, Switzerland, USA, Ireland, Germany, Czech Republic, The Netherlands, Australia, Great Britain, Canada, Austria, Italy, Lebanon, India, China, Portugal, Pakistan, Brazil, New Zealand, Russia and Malaysia. When the safety car returned to the pits the racing was very close. Portugal and India made up several places as racing resumed. Jos Verstappen also made up several places, passing Ireland (who had fallen back), but carried too much speed into the corner and launched over the back wheels of the German car, taking both of them out of the race and bringing the safety car out again less than a lap after it went in!

The safety car returned to the pits at the end of lap 18. At the restart, Ireland and the Czech Republic both passed USA and Austria dropped from 7th to 10th place. Canada retired, Pakistan overtook India and New Zealand got ahead of Russia.

On lap 23 the British car developed a gearshift problem which caused Robbie Kerr to lose a number of places. A lap later Portugal managed to pass Italy into turn 1. Shortly afterwards, officials gave a drive-through penalty to the Czech Republic for speeding in the pit lane. This would cost Tomáš Enge five places as he rejoined 10th. Brazil had just managed to overtake Lebanon for 10th place and was immediately promoted to 9th as a result of the Czech penalty.

Portugal continued to move through the field, passing Australia for 5th place on lap 30. China span off two laps later and Australia was forced to defend 6th place against a very insistent Toccacelo.

== Results ==
=== Qualification ===
Qualification took place on Saturday, October 22, 2005.

Pos	Team	Driver	Q1 Time	Q2 Time	Q3 Time	Q4 Time	Aggregate	Gap
1	Brazil	Nelson Piquet Jr.	1'50.201	1'30.755	1'31.692	1'30.561	3'01.316	--
2	Switzerland	Neel Jani	1'32.971	1'31.096	1'31.186	1'30.734	3'01.830	0.514
3	France	Alexandre Premat	1'32.354	1'31.087	1'31.834	1'31.463	3'02.550	1.234
4	Czech Republic	Tomáš Enge	1'33.301	1'31.406	1'31.542	1'32.089	3'02.948	1.632
5	The Netherlands	Jos Verstappen	1'33.612	1'31.659	1'32.542	1'31.551	3'03.210	1.894
6	Portugal	Álvaro Parente	1'33.579	1'31.923	1'32.052	1'31.378	3'03.301	1.985
7	Canada	Sean McIntosh	1'34.386	1'32.066	1'33.201	1'31.301	3'03.367	2.051
8	Malaysia	Fairuz Fauzy	1'34.872	1'32.130	1'32.889	1'31.337	3'03.467	2.151
9	Indonesia	Ananda Mikola	1'34.834	1'32.785	1'31.520	1'32.481	3'04.001	2.685
10	(United Kingdom) Great Britain	Robbie Kerr	1'35.642	1'31.782	1'32.382	1'33.315	3'04.164	2.848
11	Germany	Adrian Sutil	1'34.076	1'32.625	1'32.695	1'31.556	3'04.181	2.865
12	Mexico	Salvador Durán	1'34.294	1'32.887	1'31.750	1'32.697	3'04.447	3.131
13	Italy	Enrico Toccacelo	1'36.320	1'34.242	1'32.114	1'32.602	3'04.716	3.400
14	New Zealand	Matt Halliday	1'35.040	1'32.507	1'33.007	1'32.402	3'04.909	3.593
15	(United States) USA	Scott Speed	1'35.657	1'32.383	1'33.970	1'32.641	3'05.024	3.708
16	South Africa	Tomas Scheckter	1'35.405	1'33.068	1'33.574	1'32.450	3'05.518	4.202
17	Russia	Mikhail Aleshin	1'35.527	1'33.433	1'34.324	1'32.854	3'06.287	4.971
18	(Republic of Ireland) Ireland	Ralph Firman	1'34.041	1'33.248	--	--	3'07.289	5.973
19	Australia	Will Davison	1'35.965	--	1'33.988	1'33.339	3'07.327	6.011
20	China	Tengyi Jiang	1'59.211	1'34.975	1'33.672	1'33.871	3'07.543	6.227
21	Austria	Mathias Lauda	--	1'35.752	1'33.927	1'33.991	3'07.918	6.602
22	Pakistan	Adam Khan	1'35.977	1'35.091	1'36.030	1'33.885	3'08.976	7.660
23	Lebanon	Basil Shaaban	1'35.822	1'35.511	1'34.807	1'35.616	3'10.318	9.002
24	India	Armaan Ebrahim	1'38.955	1'37.230	1'35.702	1'35.247	3'10.949	9.663

=== Sprint Race Results ===
The Sprint Race took place on Sunday, October 23, 2005.

Pos	Team	Driver	Laps	Time	Points
1	France	Alexandre Premat	18	27'46.488	10
2	Brazil	Nelson Piquet Jr.	18	+2.055	9
3	Switzerland	Neel Jani	18	+3.289	8
4	The Netherlands	Jos Verstappen	18	+13.485	7
5	Czech Republic	Tomáš Enge	18	+13.928	6
6	Portugal	Álvaro Parente	18	+18.661	5
7	Canada	Sean McIntosh	18	+21.297	4
8	Malaysia	Fairuz Fauzy	18	+32.053	3
9	Indonesia	Ananda Mikola	18	+37.367	2
10	South Africa	Tomas Scheckter	18	+39.722	1
11	Italy	Enrico Toccacelo	18	+40.093	
12	Germany	Adrian Sutil	18	+41.826	
13	(United States) USA	Scott Speed	18	+41.915	
14	New Zealand	Matt Halliday	18	+43.178	
15	Russia	Mikhail Aleshin	18	+51.668	
16	Austria	Mathias Lauda	18	+1'06.727	
17	India	Armaan Ebrahim	18	+1'08.814	
18	Lebanon	Basil Shaaban	18	+1'16.022	
19	(Republic of Ireland) Ireland	Ralph Firman	17	+1 Lap	
DNF	(United Kingdom) Great Britain	Robbie Kerr	5	Puncture	
DNF	China	Tengyi Jiang	1	Collision	
DNF	Pakistan	Adam Khan	0	Collision	
DNF	Mexico	Salvador Durán	0	Collision	
DNF	Australia	Will Davison	0	Collision	

=== Main Race Results ===
The Main Race took place on Sunday, October 23, 2005.

Pos	Team	Driver	Laps	Time	Points
1	France	Alexandre Premat	36	1:01'05.454	10
2	Switzerland	Neel Jani	36	+7.517	9
3	(Republic of Ireland) Ireland	Ralph Firman	36	+15.933	8
4	(United States) USA	Scott Speed	36	+19.023	7
5	Portugal	Álvaro Parente	36	+27.320	6
6	Australia	Will Davison	36	+34.774	5
7	Italy	Enrico Toccacelo	36	+35.629	4
8	Brazil	Nelson Piquet Jr.	36	+36.265	3
9	Czech Republic	Tomáš Enge	36	+37.730	2
10	Austria	Mathias Lauda	36	+51.380	1
11	Lebanon	Basil Shaaban	36	+58.733	
12	(United Kingdom) Great Britain	Robbie Kerr	36	+1'01.947	
13	India	Armaan Ebrahim	36	+1'05.544	
14	China	Tengyi Jiang	36	+1'10.581	
15	Pakistan	Adam Khan	36	+1'16.517	
16	New Zealand	Matt Halliday	35	+1 Lap	
17	Russia	Mikhail Aleshin	35	+1 Lap	
DNF	Canada	Sean McIntosh	20	Mechanical	
DNF	The Netherlands	Jos Verstappen	18	Collision	
DNF	Germany	Adrian Sutil	17	Collision	
DNF	Malaysia	Fairuz Fauzy	15	Technical	
DNF	South Africa	Tomas Scheckter	14	Mechanical	
DNF	Indonesia	Ananda Mikola	11	Technical	
DNF	Mexico	Salvador Durán	9	Spun	

=== Total Points ===
Team	Points	SR	MR	FL
France	21	10	10	1
Switzerland	17	8	9	--
Brazil	12	9	3	--
Portugal	11	5	6	--
Czech Republic	8	6	2	--
(Republic of Ireland) Ireland	8	--	8	--
The Netherlands	7	7	--	--
(United States) USA	7	--	7	--
Australia	5	--	5	--
Canada	4	4	--	--
Italy	4	--	4	--
Malaysia	3	3	--	--
Indonesia	2	2	--	--
Austria	1	--	1	--
South Africa	1	1	--	--

- Fastest lap: A1 Team France (1'31.106 / 165.2 km/h, lap 23 of Main Race)
