= 2008 Brands Hatch A1GP round =

2007-08 A1GP of United Kingdom

Race Details
- Race 10 of 10 in the 2007-08 A1 Grand Prix season
- Date: May 4, 2008
- Location: Brands Hatch; Kent, United Kingdom

Sprint race

Qualifying
- Pole: Great Britain (Robbie Kerr)
- Time: 1'14.424

Podium
- 1st: Great Britain (Robbie Kerr)
- 2nd: USA (Jonathan Summerton)
- 3rd: Ireland (Adam Carroll)

Fastest Lap
- FL: China (Cong Fu Cheng)
- Time: 1'16.184, (Lap 14)

Feature race

Qualifying
- Pole: India (Narain Karthikeyan)
- Time: 1'14.682

Podium
- 1st: India (Narain Karthikeyan)
- 2nd: Great Britain (Robbie Kerr)
- 3rd: Switzerland (Neel Jani)

Fastest Lap
- FL: Ireland (Adam Carroll)
- Time: 1'15.997, (Lap 44)

Official Classifications
- PDF Booklet

The 2007–08 A1 Grand Prix of Nations, Great Britain was an A1 Grand Prix race, held on May 4, 2008, at Brands Hatch, Kent, United Kingdom. It was the tenth and last meeting in the 2007-08 A1 Grand Prix season.

With their results in the Sprint race, Switzerland was crowned as the 2007-08 A1 Grand Prix champion.

== Pre-race ==
Switzerland only needed to score 3 points more than New Zealand to become champions. Third position was also contested, as Great Britain had the possibility of taking the place away from France.

== Qualifying ==
At Great Britain's home track, Robbie Kerr qualified in pole position for the Sprint race, and on the front row for the Feature race. India earned their first pole position in A1GP, by qualifying on pole for the Feature race. New Zealand, the only team that mathematically could still beat Switzerland for the title, only qualified in 10th and 17th positions.

Sprint race qualifying
Pos	Team	Time	Gap
1	(United Kingdom) Great Britain	1'14.424	-
2	(United States) USA	1'14.426	+0.002
3	Switzerland	1'14.772	+0.348
4	(Republic of Ireland) Ireland	1'14.935	+0.511
5	India	1'15.040	+0.616
6	Portugal	1'15.077	+0.653
7	South Africa	1'15.142	+0.718
8	France	1'15.216	+0.792
9	Germany	1'15.306	+0.882
10	New Zealand	1'15.312	+0.888
11	Netherlands	1'15.338	+0.914
12	Australia	1'15.344	+0.920
13	Czech Republic	1'15.357	+0.933
14	Malaysia	1'15.439	+1.015
15	Canada	1'15.470	+1.046
16	China	1'15.954	+1.530
17	Italy	1'16.049	+1.625
18	Pakistan	1'16.086	+1.662
19	Brazil	1'16.117	+1.693
20	Lebanon	1'17.394	+2.970
21	Mexico	1'17.403	+2.979
22	Indonesia	1'17.553	+3.129

Feature race qualifying
Pos	Team	Time	Gap
1	India	1'14.682	-
2	(United Kingdom) Great Britain	1'14.909	+0.227
3	Switzerland	1'14.957	+0.275
4	(Republic of Ireland) Ireland	1'15.020	+0.338
5	Germany	1'15.042	+0.360
6	France	1'15.266	+0.584
7	South Africa	1'15.284	+0.602
8	China	1'15.313	+0.631
9	(United States) USA	1'15.398	+0.716
10	Netherlands	1'15.620	+0.938
11	Portugal	1'15.627	+0.945
12	Malaysia	1'15.664	+0.982
13	Canada	1'15.667	+0.985
14	Brazil	1'15.671	+0.989
15	Czech Republic	1'15.690	+1.008
16	Italy	1'15.827	+1.145
17	New Zealand	1'16.003	+1.321
18	Pakistan	1'16.063	+1.381
19	Australia	1'16.175	+1.493
20	Indonesia	1'16.876	+2.194
21	Lebanon	1'16.942	+2.260
22	Mexico	1'17.062	+2.380

== Sprint race ==
After the start Great Britain took the lead ahead of USA, Ireland, Switzerland, India, Portugal, South Africa and New Zealand. On Lap 4, Robbie Kerr set the fastest lap.
China attacked Australia for 14th, and India pressured Switzerland for 4th place, but the positions remained the same during the race. On Lap 12, Cong Fu Cheng (China) slowed and fell from 15th to 21st. But some laps later, Cheng took fastest lap. Adam Carroll (Ireland) and Jonathan Summerton (USA) fought for 2nd position, whilst Great Britain won the Sprint race at their home track..
In finishing 4th, Neel Jani and Switzerland took the 2007-08 title.

Pos	Team	Driver	Laps	Time	Points
1	(United Kingdom) Great Britain	Robbie Kerr	15	19'19.143	15
2	(United States) USA	Jonathan Summerton	15	+1.126	12
3	(Republic of Ireland) Ireland	Adam Carroll	15	+2.186	10
4	Switzerland	Neel Jani	15	+4.125	8
5	India	Narain Karthikeyan	15	+4.467	6
6	Portugal	Filipe Albuquerque	15	+5.397	5
7	South Africa	Adrian Zaugg	15	+6.114	4
8	New Zealand	Jonny Reid	15	+8.385	3
9	Netherlands	Jeroen Bleekemolen	15	+9.825	2
10	France	Franck Montagny	15	+10.878	1
11	Germany	Michael Ammermüller	15	+11.203	
12	Czech Republic	Filip Salaquarda	15	+11.995	
13	Malaysia	Fairuz Fauzy	15	+14.354	
14	Australia	John Martin	15	+15.846	
15	Canada	James Hinchcliffe	15	+17.317	
16	Brazil	Alexandre Negrão	15	+18.107	
17	Italy	Edoardo Piscopo	15	+18.601	
18	Pakistan	Adam Langley-Khan	15	+23.887	
19	Indonesia	Satrio Hermanto	15	+29.954	
20	Mexico	David Martínez	15	+30.322	
21	China	Cong Fu Cheng	15	+31.521	+1
22	Lebanon	Khalil Beschir	15	+36.238	

== Feature race ==
It was 19 °C for the Feature race. Mandatory pit stops were to take place between laps 8 and 16, and the second window was between laps 32 and 40. Switzerland already took the title, but New Zealand, France and Great Britain were all in contention for the 2nd and 3rd places overall.

India grabbed the lead off the start, ahead of Great Britain and Ireland. On Lap 2, Pakistan and Australia collided and hit the barriers. The Safety car was deployed. Alexandre Negrão (Brazil) had to pit to change the car's nose, following an off-track excursion on the first lap. The Safety car pulled in on Lap 8. Next lap, Jeroen Bleekemolen (Netherlands) passed Adrian Zaugg (South Africa) for eighth. India has a slow pit stop, and Great Britain exit the pits ahead of them. Adam Carroll (Ireland) was closing and pushing Narain Karthikeyan (India). Canada received a drive-through penalty on Lap 13 and another on Lap 17. After the first set of mandatory pit stops, Great Britain leads India, Ireland, Germany, Portugal, France, Switzerland, China, Netherlands and USA.

On Lap 17, Ireland pulled alongside India to pass into Westfield and both cars touch. Ireland's front wing was damaged by contact with the left-rear wheel of India's car. After the wing flew off a lap later, Ireland suffered a puncture. After pitting, Ireland fell out of the points. On Lap 21, Canada received a third drive-through penalty. On Lap 23, Ireland set the fastest lap. The window for the second set of mandatory pit stops opened on Lap 32 and India, Great Britain and Germany all pit. India takes the lead back after a slow stop from Great Britain. On Lap 38, Germany is out in the gravel and Malaysia retires to the pits with engine problems. On Lap 44, Filipe Albuquerque (Portugal) passes Jonny Reid (New Zealand) for seventh.

India wins its second Feature race of the season. Great Britain is second ahead of Switzerland, China, France, Netherlands, Portugal, New Zealand, Italy and Indonesia who score their first points of the season. With their second place, Great Britain took third place in the overall standings from France.

Pos	Team	Driver	Laps	Time	Points
1	India	Narain Karthikeyan	48	1:07'24.691	15
2	(United Kingdom) Great Britain	Robbie Kerr	48	+1.078	12
3	Switzerland	Neel Jani	48	+8.725	10
4	China	Cong Fu Cheng	48	+9.132	8
5	France	Franck Montagny	48	+12.960	6
6	Netherlands	Jeroen Bleekemolen	48	+15.538	5
7	Portugal	Filipe Albuquerque	48	+15.714	4
8	New Zealand	Jonny Reid	48	+19.862	3
9	Italy	Edoardo Piscopo	48	+26.353	2
10	Indonesia	Satrio Hermanto	48	+49.268	1
11	South Africa	Adrian Zaugg	48	+49.661	
12	(United States) USA	Jonathan Summerton	48	+50.032	
13	(Republic of Ireland) Ireland	Adam Carroll	48	+50.247	+1
14	Brazil	Alexandre Negrão	48	+1'00.662	
15	Czech Republic	Filip Salaquarda	47	+1 lap	
16	Mexico	Jorge Goeters	47	+1 lap	
17	Canada	James Hinchcliffe	47	+1 lap	
18	Lebanon	Khalil Beschir	46	+2 laps	
DNF	Germany	Michael Ammermüller	39	Spun off	
DNF	Malaysia	Fairuz Fauzy	39	Engine	
DNF	Pakistan	Adam Langley-Khan	2	Colision	
DNF	Australia	John Martin	2	Colision	

== After race ==
On Monday 5 May, the A1GP's Gala Awards were celebrated at the Hilton Park Lane in London, at the end of its 2007-08 season. The awards presented at the event were:

- Best event for Mexico City, Mexico,
- Most improved team for A1 Team Ireland,
- Rookie driver of the year for Robert Wickens (Canada),
- Most spectacular overtaking move for Robert Wickens (Canada),
- A1GP.com favourite team for A1 Team Malaysia,
- A1 team PR excellence for A1 Team Netherlands,
- Best presented team for A1 Team Ireland,
- Best broadcaster for ESPN Star Sports.

== Notes ==
- The Switzerland team ran with the message:the A1 Team Switzerland car carried the message: Jo Siffert, 40th Anniversary, Brands Hatch which commemorated his 1968 British Grand Prix victory at Brands Hatch.
- It was the 32nd race weekend (64 starts).
- It was the 3rd race weekend in Brands Hatch and the 3rd in the United Kingdom.
- It was the first race weekend as Rookie driver for Frankie Provenzano (Italy).
- Records:
  - India and Narain Karthikeyan earned their first pole position.
  - Lebanon have participated in 32 rounds (64 starts) without scoring a single point.
  - Neel Jani scored 307 points.
