= 2006 Brno A1GP round =

Auto race held near Brno, Czech Republic

2006-07 A1GP of Czech Republic

Race Details
- Race 2 of 11 in the 2006-07 A1 Grand Prix season
- Date: October 8, 2006
- Location: Auto Motodrom Brno; Brno, Czech Republic
- Weather: Clear 16°C

Qualifying
- Pole: New Zealand (Jonny Reid)
- Time: 3'30.053 (1'45.040, 1'45.013)

Sprint Race
- 1st: Malaysia (Alex Yoong)
- 2nd: Canada (James Hinchcliffe)
- 3rd: France (Nicolas Lapierre)

Main Race
- 1st: Malaysia (Alex Yoong)
- 2nd: Czech Republic (Tomáš Enge)
- 3rd: Mexico (Salvador Durán)

Fast Lap
- FL: Malaysia (Alex Yoong)
- Time: 1'47.296, (Lap 2 of Sprint Race)

Official Classifications
- Prac1-A ·Prac1-B ·Prac2 ·Prac3 ·Qual ·SRace ·MRace

Layout of the Brno Circuit

The 2006–07 A1 Grand Prix of Nations, Czech Republic was an A1 Grand Prix race, held on October 8, 2006, at Masaryk Circuit near Brno, Czech Republic. This was the second race in the 2006-07 A1 Grand Prix season.

== Results ==
=== Qualification ===
Qualification took place on Saturday, October 7, 2006

Pos	Team	Driver	Q1 Time	Q2 Time	Q3 Time	Q4 Time	Aggregate	Gap
1	New Zealand	Jonny Reid	1'45.676	1'46.836	1'45.040	1'45.013	3'30.053	--
2	Germany	Nico Hülkenberg	1'45.917	1'47.398	1'45.499	1'45.025	3'30.524	0.471
3	Malaysia	Alex Yoong	1'46.009	1'47.551	1'45.851	1'45.200	3'31.051	0.998
4	China	Congfu Cheng	1'47.559	1'47.215	1'45.861	1'45.670	3'31.531	1.478
5	Canada	James Hinchcliffe	1'46.897	1'48.291	1'46.044	1'45.629	3'31.673	1.620
6	(United States) USA	Philip Giebler	1'46.283	1'47.137	1'45.877	1'45.866	3'31.743	1.690
7	Czech Republic	Tomáš Enge	1'47.203	1'48.151	1'46.253	1'45.763	3'32.016	1.963
8	France	Nicolas Lapierre	1'46.063	1'47.191	1'47.676	1'46.164	3'32.227	2.174
9	Switzerland	Sébastien Buemi	1'46.782	1'48.143	1'46.406	1'46.368	3'32.774	2.721
10	(United Kingdom) Great Britain	Robbie Kerr	1'49.709	1'46.836	1'45.951	1'45.449*	3'32.787	2.734
11	Mexico	Salvador Durán	1'46.514	1'47.683	1'46.429	1'46.995	3'32.943	2.890
12	Netherlands	Jeroen Bleekemolen	1'46.749	1'47.878	1'46.744	1'46.232	3'32.976	2.923
13	Lebanon	Graham Rahal	1'48.882	1'46.843	1'48.100	1'46.517	3'33.360	3.307
14	South Africa	Stephen Simpson	1'47.092	1'48.539	1'46.870	1'46.806	3'33.676	3.623
15	Brazil	Tuka Rocha	1'46.968	1'48.050	1'46.985	1'46.764	3'33.732	3.679
16	Indonesia	Ananda Mikola	1'47.435	1'48.853	1'47.138	1'46.941	3'34.079	4.026
17	Italy	Alessandro Pier Guidi	1'48.295	1'47.260	1'47.637	1'49.384	3'34.897	4.844
18	(Republic of Ireland) Ireland	Michael Devaney	1'48.088	1'49.223	1'47.932	1'47.374	3'35.306	5.253
19	India	Armaan Ebrahim	1'49.046	1'49.458	1'48.253	1'47.823	3'36.076	6.023
20	Australia	Karl Reindler	1'49.645	1'49.097	1'48.577	1'48.918	3'37.495	7.442
21	Greece	Takis Kaitatzis	1'49.044	1'49.577	1'48.976	1'49.784	3'38.020	7.967
22	Singapore	Denis Lian	1'50.321	1'51.283	1'49.290	1'49.447	3'38.767	8.714
23	Pakistan	Nur Ali	1'54.174	1'51.768	1'53.145	1'50.825	3'42.593	12.540

* After qualifying, the A1 Team Great Britain car was found to be 4 mm over the maximum width, and the stewards disallowed the team's fastest qualifying time. ()

=== Sprint Race Results ===
The Sprint Race took place on Sunday, October 8, 2006

Pos	Team	Driver	Laps	Time	Points
1	Malaysia	Alex Yoong	10	18'02.946	6
2	Canada	James Hinchcliffe	10	+ 1.634	5
3	France	Nicolas Lapierre	10	+ 2.731	4
4	China	Congfu Cheng	10	+ 4.662	3
5	Czech Republic	Tomáš Enge	10	+ 6.092	2
6	(United States) USA	Philip Giebler	10	+ 6.683	1
7	Mexico	Salvador Durán	10	+ 10.756	
8	Switzerland	Sébastien Buemi	10	+ 12.430	
9	(United Kingdom) Great Britain	Robbie Kerr	10	+ 13.404	
10	Brazil	Tuka Rocha	10	+ 15.019	
11	Netherlands	Jeroen Bleekemolen	10	+ 15.498	
12	Lebanon	Graham Rahal	10	+ 19.493	
13	(Republic of Ireland) Ireland	Michael Devaney	10	+ 21.644	
14	Italy	Alessandro Pier Guidi	10	+ 24.739	
15	Australia	Karl Reindler	10	+ 32.922	
16	Indonesia	Ananda Mikola	10	+ 34.511	
17	India	Armaan Ebrahim	10	+ 34.848	
18	Singapore	Denis Lian	10	+ 45.084	
19	Greece	Nikos Zachos	10	+ 45.696	
20	Pakistan	Nur Ali	10	+ 1'02.366	
DNF	South Africa	Stephen Simpson	4	+ 6 laps	
DNF	New Zealand	Jonny Reid	1	+ 9 laps	
DNF	Germany	Nico Hülkenberg	0	+ 10 laps	

=== Feature Race Results ===
The Feature Race took place on Sunday, October 8, 2006

Pos	Team	Driver	Laps	Time	Points
1	Malaysia	Alex Yoong	38	1:10'47.815	10
2	Czech Republic	Tomáš Enge	38	+ 7.336	9
3	Mexico	Salvador Durán	38	+ 8.965	8
4	Germany	Nico Hülkenberg	38	+ 9.842	7
5	Canada	James Hinchcliffe	38	+ 12.984	6
6	(United Kingdom) Great Britain	Robbie Kerr	38	+ 14.042	5
7	New Zealand	Jonny Reid	38	+ 14.619	4
8	China	Congfu Cheng	38	+ 31.375	3
9	Netherlands	Jeroen Bleekemolen	38	+ 32.262	2
10	Switzerland	Sébastien Buemi	38	+ 33.253	1
11	South Africa	Stephen Simpson	38	+ 33.921	
12	Lebanon	Graham Rahal	38	+ 35.201	
13	(Republic of Ireland) Ireland	Michael Devaney	10	+ 21.644	
14	Brazil	Tuka Rocha	38	+ 52.456	
15	Indonesia	Ananda Mikola	38	+ 53.670	
16	Australia	Karl Reindler	38	+ 1'05.687	
17	(United States) USA	Philip Giebler	38	+ 1'28.689	
18	India	Armaan Ebrahim	37	+ 1 lap	
19	Singapore	Denis Lian	37	+ 1 lap	
20	Italy	Alessandro Pier Guidi	37	+ 1 lap	
DNF	Greece	Takis Kaitatzis	19	+ 19 laps	
DNF	Pakistan	Nur Ali	10	+ 28 laps	
DNF	France	Nicolas Lapierre	1	+ 37 laps	

=== Total Points ===
Total points awarded:

Team	Points	SR	MR	FL
Malaysia	17	6	10	1
Canada	11	5	6	
Czech Republic	11	2	9	
Mexico	8		8	
Germany	7		7	
China	6	3	3	
(United Kingdom) Great Britain	5		5	
France	4	4		
New Zealand	4		4	
Netherlands	2		2	
(United States) USA	1	1		
Switzerland	1		1	
Australia				
Brazil				
Greece				
India				
Indonesia				
(Republic of Ireland) Ireland				
Italy				
Lebanon				
Pakistan				
Singapore				
South Africa				

- Fastest Lap: Alex Yoong, A1 Team Malaysia, 1'47.296 on lap 2 of Sprint Race
