= 2005 Lausitzring A1GP round =

2005–06 A1GP of Germany

Race Details
- Race 2 of 11 in the 2005–06 A1 Grand Prix season
- Date: October 9, 2005
- Location: EuroSpeedway Lausitz; Klettwitz, Germany
- Weather: Fine

Qualifying
- Pole: France (Nicolas Lapierre)
- Time: 3'05.332 (1'32.661, 1'32.671)

Sprint Race
- 1st: France (Nicolas Lapierre)
- 2nd: Switzerland (Neel Jani)
- 3rd: Brazil (Nelson Piquet Jr.)

Main Race
- 1st: France (Nicolas Lapierre)
- 2nd: Great Britain (Robbie Kerr)
- 3rd: Canada (Sean McIntosh)

Fast Lap
- FL: Brazil (Nelson Piquet Jr.)
- Time: 1'34.736, (Lap 14 of Sprint Race)

Official Classifications
- Prac1 ·Prac2 ·Prac3 ·Qual ·SRace ·MRace

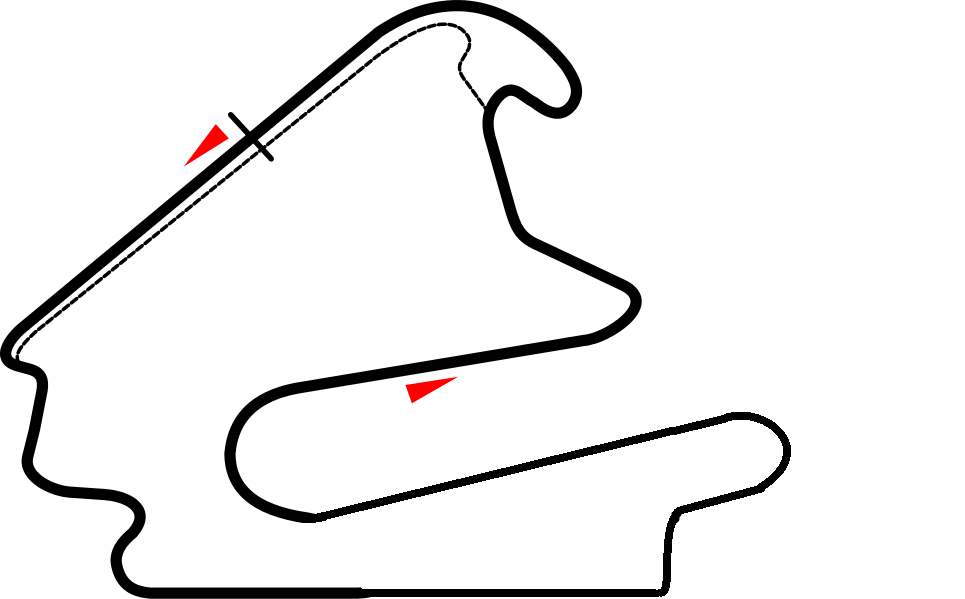
Layout of the EuroSpeedway Lausitz GP circuit

The 2005–06 A1 Grand Prix of Nations, Germany was an A1 Grand Prix race, held on the weekend of October 9, 2005 at the EuroSpeedway Lausitz circuit.

== Report ==
=== Practice ===
Friday practice for the second A1 Grand Prix race showed how close the competition in the new series is set to be. In the first session, A1 Team Great Britain's Robbie Kerr topped the timesheets with a 1'34.675, followed by A1 Team France's Nicolas Lapierre just 0.023 seconds behind. Nelson Piquet Jr. continued his impressive form in the series to set the third fastest time, with the top 11 cars in the session covered by just one second. Impressive performers in the first round, Australia were relatively disappointing in 23rd position, with Christian Jones making his debut in the car. A1 Team Russia decided not to compete in the round, preferring to give themselves extra time to prepare for the next round in Portugal.

The second practice session was also closely contested, with once again the top 11 cars covered by less than one second. Lapierre set the fastest time, a 1'34.150, nearly four tenths of a second ahead of A1 Team Ireland's Ralph Firman in 2nd, and A1 Team Germany's Timo Scheider in 3rd. Jos Verstappen set the fourth-fastest time for A1 Team The Netherlands, while A1 Team Indonesia continued their impressive weekend form with a 5th-place. Jones struggled again, finishing dead last of the teams and setting A1 Team Australia a difficult task for qualifying. China's Tengyi Jiang improved over 1.3 seconds on his morning time to move into 19th, while A1 Team Lebanon had their times for the session cancelled after failing to notify A1 Grand Prix of a change to their nominated driver for the session.

Saturday's session saw the usual suspects move to the top of the leaderboard, with France (2nd), New Zealand (3rd), Brazil (4th), Switzerland (5th) and The Netherlands (6th) all setting quick times. The surprise of the session was Scheider, who took top spot after continuing improvement over the race weekend.

=== Qualifying ===
A1 Team France took their first pole position in A1GP with an impressive qualifying session by Nicolas Lapierre. He was one of only three drivers to set times under 1'33, setting his quickest times on his second and third runs to take an aggregate time of 3'05.332. A1 Team USA surprised the paddock to take the other front row spot, driver Scott Speed managing to set the session's overall best time of 1'32.622 to end up only 0.056 seconds behind Lapierre. A1 Team Brazil confirmed their position as one of the top teams to take third, while Robbie Kerr took fourth for Great Britain. Timo Scheider (Germany) continued his impressive form to take fifth, with Neel Jani (Switzerland) alongside him in sixth. Australia and South Africa continued with their dismal weekends, ending up in 22nd and 23rd respectively, while the inexperienced Khalil Beschir could do no better than 24th for Lebanon, nearly 2 seconds behind South Africa and 7 seconds behind the polesitter.

=== Sprint race ===
Before the start of the sprint race, all A1 Teams and drivers observed a minute's silence in respect to the victims of the 2005 Kashmir earthquake in Pakistan, India and Afghanistan. A1 Team France started at the front of the grid for the 30 minute race, which began with a rolling start. A first-corner incident between USA and Great Britain eliminated both teams on the spot, with Switzerland taking advantage of the chaos to slip into 2nd. The collision also allowed Piquet to make up for starting the race in the wrong gear, the Brazilian able to retain his 3rd-place grid position by the end of the first lap. Pakistan and Malaysia were also major beneficiaries of the confusion, gaining 9 and 13 positions respectively for both teams to move into the top 10. With no compulsory pitstops in the shorter race, the top four positions remained the same for the remainder of the race, the drivers choosing to continue the trend of "playing it safe" in order not to compromise their starting position for the main race. Lapierre took the 10 points and France's first A1GP race win to continue the team's perfect weekend. Switzerland's Jani took their first podium, with Piquet coming in third for Brazil to continue their championship lead. On lap 14, Piquet was also able to set the fastest lap, which could mean an additional point for Brazil, provided the time of 1'34.736 was not beaten in the main race.

The race was not so good for The Netherlands, who were forced to retire after just one lap due to damage. This also meant that Jos Verstappen would start from 22nd place in the main race, hindering the Dutch team's chances of taking A1GP points despite their obvious pace. Other retirees included Pakistan and Portugal, who collided in the first corner of lap 2, forcing both teams out of the race with damage. A1 Team Italy also had a disappointing race, being handed a 25-second penalty for overtaking under a yellow caution flag, and falling out of the points from 8th to 17th.

=== Main race ===
The main race began with A1 Team France on pole, due to its win in the sprint race, but the lead was short-lived, as Switzerland got a better start and moved into first place. A1 Team Malaysia also got a good start from 6th, and Alex Yoong was able to take 3rd by the end of lap 1, following by Brazil. Brazil was able to re-take the position on the following lap, and with Timo Scheider also taking advantage to move into 4th, Malaysia was down to 5th. On lap 3, A1 Team Czech Republic also got past Yoong, while Ireland dropped dramatically from 13th to 19th. Lap 4 saw France move into the lead, passing Jani after using the PowerBoost button. Scheider continued his move up the field, taking 3rd from Brazil on lap 7 when Piquet took his compulsory pitstop. The Brazilian team again had difficulties with their stop, costing Piquet precious time and dropping him to 18th. Further problems emerged from the pitstop when the team were penalised for having an extra man in the stop, and Brazil were given a drive-through penalty. Meanwhile, Great Britain had begun an impressive drive through the field, and were in 11th on lap 10 after having started the race from dead last. The only retirements for the race so far were USA (tyre puncture on lap 4) and Italy (lap 11).

The order at the front of the field remained the same until lap 16, when France pitted to give Switzerland the lead. This allowed A1 Team New Zealand into 2nd, and India into an incredible 3rd place, having started 16th on the grid. Great Britain's drive had continued up to 6th place, and by this stage a podium finish was a real possibility. Switzerland's troublesome long pitstop on lap 21 meant that Jani slipped down to 5th, allowing France to stretch its lead at the front. South Africa ended its poor weekend with retirement on lap 15 and zero points, while India's joy was relatively short-lived, an alternator failure soon after the team's pitstop forcing Karun Chandhok out of the race on lap 19. This retirement caused a safety car period to allow the car to be retrieved from the start-finish straight, with France leading, followed by Great Britain and Canada. Malaysia's race was effectively ended when it was adjudged that Yoong had overtaken another car during the safety car period, and he was handed a drive-through penalty.

At the restart of the race, Czech Republic, Japan and Brazil were battling for eighth spot when Japan's Hideki Noda turned in on Brazil, forcing Piquet to spin out and retire from the race immediately. The collision sent Piquet into Czech driver Tomáš Enge, who was also forced to retire with broken steering the following lap. The positions at the front remained largely the same for the remainder of the race, although Switzerland was able to take 5th from Ireland 6 laps from the finish. Lapierre's win gave France 20 points for the weekend, as Piquet's quick lap in the sprint race proved fast enough to secure Brazil an extra point. Great Britain and Canada filled the remaining podium positions, followed home by the consistent New Zealand, who picked up 14 points. Germany picked up the final point in 10th point, after a troublesome wheel nut forced a long pitstop which saw Scheider fall back to 18th. Lebanon's Khalil Beschir provided the team's best result in the series with 18th, although he finished 2 laps down and was last of the cars that finished. Brazil still remain ahead in the championship, but lie just a single point ahead of both New Zealand and France, tied on 29.

== Results ==
=== Qualification ===
Qualification took place on Saturday, October 8, 2005.

| Pos. | Team | Driver | Sessions | | | | Agg. | Gap |
| Pos. | Team | Driver | Q1 | Q2 | Q3 | Q4 | Agg. | Gap |
|---|---|---|---|---|---|---|---|---|
| 1 | France | Nicolas Lapierre | 1:33.834 | 1:32.661 | 1:32.671 | 1:32.704 | 3:05.332 | |
| 2 | United States | Scott Speed | 1:35.193 | 1:33.305 | 1:32.766 | 1:32.622 | 3:05.388 | +0.056 |
| 3 | Brazil | Nelson Piquet, Jr. | 1:33.207 | 1:33.398 | 1:32.760 | 1:32.826 | 3:05.586 | +0.254 |
| 4 | (United Kingdom) Great Britain | Robbie Kerr | 1:33.233 | 1:33.555 | 1:33.140 | 1:33.061 | 3:06.201 | +0.869 |
| 5 | Germany | Timo Scheider | 1:34.785 | 1:33.212 | 1:33.205 | 1:33.004 | 3:06.209 | +0.877 |
| 6 | Switzerland | Neel Jani | 1:34.658 | 1:33.761 | 1:33.554 | 1:32.901 | 3:06.455 | +1.123 |
| 7 | Italy | Enrico Toccacelo | 1:34.868 | 1:33.629 | 1:33.769 | 1:33.380 | 3:07.009 | +1.677 |
| 8 | (Republic of Ireland) Ireland | Ralph Firman | 1:34.764 | No time | 1:33.626 | 1:33.409 | 3:07.035 | +1.703 |
| 9 | Portugal | Álvaro Parente | 1:36.019 | 1:33.795 | 1:33.659 | 1:33.714 | 3:07.373 | +2.041 |
| 10 | Netherlands | Jos Verstappen | 1:34.405 | 1:33.854 | 1:34.477 | 1:33.537 | 3:07.391 | +2.059 |
| 11 | Mexico | David Martínez | 1:35.729 | 1:34.439 | 1:33.903 | 1:33.522 | 3:07.425 | +2.093 |
| 12 | Czech Republic | Tomáš Enge | 1:34.979 | 1:33.546 | 1:34.162 | 1:33.903 | 3:07.449 | +2.117 |
| 13 | Canada | Sean McIntosh | 1:35.027 | 1:34.377 | 1:33.927 | 1:33.657 | 3:07.584 | +2.252 |
| 14 | New Zealand | Jonny Reid | 1:34.115 | 1:34.530 | 1:33.898 | 1:33.781 | 3:07.679 | +2.347 |
| 15 | Indonesia | Ananda Mikola | 1:36.242 | 1:34.143 | 1:33.638 | 1:34.091 | 3:07.729 | +2.397 |
| 16 | Pakistan | Adam Khan | 1:35.801 | 1:34.768 | 1:34.132 | 1:34.427 | 3:08.559 | +3.227 |
| 17 | India | Karun Chandhok | 1:36.655 | No time | 1:34.890 | 1:34.365 | 3:09.255 | +3.923 |
| 18 | Malaysia | Alex Yoong | 1:36.080 | 1:35.334 | No time | 1:34.165 | 3:09.499 | +4.167 |
| 19 | Austria | Mathias Lauda | 1:37.094 | 1:35.162 | 1:35.189 | 1:34.558 | 3:09.720 | +4.388 |
| 20 | China | Tengyi Jiang | 1:37.109 | 1:35.099 | 1:35.578 | 1:35.062 | 3:10.161 | +4.829 |
| 21 | Japan | Hideki Noda | 1:35.712 | No time | 1:35.179 | 1:35.166 | 3:10.345 | +5.013 |
| 22 | Australia | Christian Jones | 1:35.846 | 1:37.006 | 1:35.442 | 1:34.929 | 3:10.371 | +5.039 |
| 23 | South Africa | Tomas Scheckter | 1:37.190 | 1:36.368 | 1:34.987 | 1:35.537 | 3:10.524 | +5.192 |
| 24 | Lebanon | Khalil Beschir | 1:36.832 | 1:36.549 | 1:35.706 | 1:37.522 | 3:12.255 | +6.923 |

=== Sprint Race Results ===
The Sprint Race took place on Sunday, October 9, 2005.

| Pos. | Team | Driver | Laps | Time/Retired | Grid | Pts. |
|---|---|---|---|---|---|---|
| 1 | France | Nicolas Lapierre | 18 | 30:10.4 | 1 | 10 |
| 2 | Switzerland | Neel Jani | 18 | +2.013 | 6 | 9 |
| 3 | Brazil | Nelson Piquet, Jr. | 18 | +2.458 | 3 | 8 |
| 4 | New Zealand | Jonny Reid | 18 | +8.046 | 14 | 7 |
| 5 | Germany | Timo Scheider | 18 | +8.851 | 5 | 6 |
| 6 | Malaysia | Alex Yoong | 18 | +23.419 | 18 | 5 |
| 7 | Canada | Sean McIntosh | 18 | +24.009 | 13 | 4 |
| 8 | Mexico | David Martínez | 18 | +25.409 | 11 | 3 |
| 9 | (Republic of Ireland) Ireland | Ralph Firman | 18 | +26.581 | 8 | 2 |
| 10 | Japan | Hideki Noda | 18 | +27.842 | 21 | 1 |
| 11 | Czech Republic | Tomáš Enge | 18 | +28.242 | 12 | |
| 12 | South Africa | Tomas Scheckter | 18 | +40.261 | 23 | |
| 13 | Austria | Mathias Lauda | 18 | +41.007 | 19 | |
| 14 | Indonesia | Ananda Mikola | 18 | +42.635 | 15 | |
| 15 | Australia | Christian Jones | 18 | +43.456 | 22 | |
| 16 | India | Karun Chandhok | 18 | +43.879 | 17 | |
| 17 | Italy | Enrico Toccacelo | 18 | +49.525 | 7 | |
| 18 | China | Tengyi Jiang | 16 | +2 Laps | 20 | |
| DNF | Lebanon | Khalil Beschir | 7 | Mechanical | 24 | |
| DNF | Portugal | Álvaro Parente | 3 | Technical | 9 | |
| DNF | Pakistan | Adam Khan | 2 | Puncture | 16 | |
| DNF | Netherlands | Jos Verstappen | 1 | Puncture | 10 | |
| DNF | United States | Scott Speed | 0 | Crash | 2 | |
| DNF | (United Kingdom) Great Britain | Robbie Kerr | 0 | Crash | 4 | |

=== Main Race Results ===
The Main Race also took place on Sunday, October 9, 2005.

| Pos. | Team | Driver | Laps | Time/Retired | Grid | Pts. |
|---|---|---|---|---|---|---|
| 1 | France | Nicolas Lapierre | 35 | 58:45.7 | 1 | 10 |
| 2 | (United Kingdom) Great Britain | Robbie Kerr | 35 | +3.706 | 24 | 9 |
| 3 | Canada | Sean McIntosh | 35 | +5.458 | 7 | 8 |
| 4 | New Zealand | Jonny Reid | 35 | +5.974 | 4 | 7 |
| 5 | Switzerland | Neel Jani | 35 | +7.071 | 2 | 6 |
| 6 | (Republic of Ireland) Ireland | Ralph Firman | 35 | +8.081 | 9 | 5 |
| 7 | Netherlands | Jos Verstappen | 35 | +9.622 | 22 | 4 |
| 8 | Indonesia | Ananda Mikola | 35 | +16.706 | 14 | 3 |
| 9 | Japan | Hideki Noda | 35 | +19.344 | 10 | 2 |
| 10 | Germany | Timo Scheider | 35 | +21.860 | 5 | 1 |
| 11 | Portugal | Álvaro Parente | 35 | +24.740 | 20 | |
| 12 | Pakistan | Adam Khan | 35 | +25.266 | 21 | |
| 13 | Mexico | David Martínez | 35 | +29.178 | 8 | |
| 14 | Australia | Christian Jones | 35 | +30.890 | 15 | |
| 15 | Austria | Mathias Lauda | 35 | +31.132 | 13 | |
| 16 | Malaysia | Alex Yoong | 35 | +45.381 | 6 | |
| 17 | China | Tengyi Jiang | 35 | +1:17.441 | 18 | |
| 18 | Lebanon | Khalil Beschir | 33 | +2 Laps | 19 | |
| DNF | Czech Republic | Tomáš Enge | 27 | Collision | 11 | |
| DNF | Brazil | Nelson Piquet, Jr. | 26 | Collision | 3 | |
| DNF | India | Karun Chandhok | 19 | Mechanical | 16 | |
| DNF | South Africa | Tomas Scheckter | 15 | Mechanical | 12 | |
| DNF | Italy | Enrico Toccacelo | 11 | Mechanical | 17 | |
| DNF | United States | Scott Speed | 4 | Technical | 23 | |

== Standings ==
Event standings

| Pos. | Team | SR | MR | Total |
|---|---|---|---|---|
| 1 | France | 1 | 1 | 21 |
| 2 | Switzerland | 2 | 5 | 15 |
| 3 | New Zealand | 4 | 4 | 14 |
| 4 | Canada | 7 | 3 | 12 |
| 5 | (United Kingdom) Great Britain | DNF | 2 | 9 |
| 6 | Brazil | 3 | DNF | 8 |
| 7 | Germany | 5 | 10 | 7 |
| 8 | (Republic of Ireland) Ireland | 9 | 6 | 7 |
| 9 | Malaysia | 6 | 16 | 5 |
| 10 | Netherlands | DNF | 7 | 4 |
| 11 | Mexico | 8 | 13 | 3 |
| 12 | Indonesia | 14 | 8 | 3 |
| 13 | Japan | 10 | 9 | 3 |
| 14 | Czech Republic | 11 | DNF | 0 |
| 15 | Portugal | DNF | 11 | 0 |
| 16 | South Africa | 12 | DNF | 0 |
| 17 | Pakistan | DNF | 12 | 0 |
| 18 | Austria | 13 | 15 | 0 |
| 19 | Australia | 15 | 14 | 0 |
| 20 | India | 16 | DNF | 0 |
| 21 | Italy | 17 | DNF | 0 |
| 22 | China | 18 | 17 | 0 |
| 23 | Lebanon | DNF | 18 | 0 |
| 24 | United States | DNF | DNF | 0 |

Championship standings

| Pos. | Team | Points | Gap |
|---|---|---|---|
| 1 | Brazil | 30 | |
| 2 | France | 29 | +1 |
| 2 | New Zealand | 29 | +1 |
| 4 | Switzerland | 17 | +13 |
| 5 | Australia | 16 | +14 |
| 5 | Mexico | 16 | +14 |
| 7 | (United Kingdom) Great Britain | 15 | +15 |
| 8 | Canada | 14 | +16 |
| 9 | Malaysia | 11 | +19 |
| 10 | Germany | 8 | +22 |
| 10 | (Republic of Ireland) Ireland | 8 | +22 |
| 10 | Netherlands | 8 | +22 |
| 13 | Japan | 6 | +24 |
| 14 | South Africa | 5 | +25 |
| 15 | Pakistan | 4 | +26 |
| 16 | Indonesia | 3 | +27 |
| 16 | Portugal | 3 | +27 |
| | Czech Republic | 0 | +30 |
| | Italy | 0 | +30 |
| | United States | 0 | +30 |
| | Austria | 0 | +30 |
| | China | 0 | +30 |
| | Lebanon | 0 | +30 |
| | India | 0 | +30 |
| | Russia | 0 | +30 |
