= 2006 Zandvoort A1GP round =

2006-07 A1GP of Netherlands

Race Details
- Race 1 of 11 in the 2006-07 A1 Grand Prix season
- Date: October 1, 2006
- Location: Circuit Park Zandvoort; Zandvoort, Netherlands
- Weather: Overcast, rain at times

Qualifying
- Pole: South Africa (Adrian Zaugg)
- Time: 2'55.531 (1'28.182, 1'27.349)

Sprint Race
- 1st: South Africa (Adrian Zaugg)
- 2nd: Mexico (Salvador Durán)
- 3rd: France (Nicolas Lapierre)

Main Race
- 1st: Germany (Nico Hülkenberg)
- 2nd: USA (Philip Giebler)
- 3rd: Australia (Ryan Briscoe)

Fast Lap
- FL: South Africa (Adrian Zaugg)
- Time: 1'29.125, (Lap 7 of Sprint Race)

Official Classifications
- Prac1-A ·Prac1-B ·Prac2 ·Prac3 ·Qual ·SRace ·MRace

Layout of the Circuit Park Zandvoort

The 2006–07 A1 Grand Prix of Nations, Netherlands was an A1 Grand Prix race, held on October 1, 2006 at the Circuit Park Zandvoort circuit in Zandvoort, Netherlands. This was the first race in the 2006-07 A1 Grand Prix season.

== Report ==
=== Qualifying ===
Qualification took place on Saturday, September 30, 2006

Pos	Team	Driver	Q1 Time	Q2 Time	Q3 Time	Q4 Time	Aggregate	Gap
1	South Africa	Adrian Zaugg	1'28.893	1'28.470	1'28.182	1'27.349	2'55.531	--
2	Mexico	Salvador Durán	1'28.504	1'28.572	1'27.966	1'27.670	2'55.636	0.105
3	France	Nicolas Lapierre	1'28.866	1'28.804	1'27.931	1'27.757	2'55.688	0.157
4	Germany	Nico Hülkenberg	1'28.793	1'29.438	1'27.661	1'28.144	2:55.805	0.274
~~6~~ → 5	(United Kingdom) Great Britain	Darren Manning	1'30.314	1'28.975	1'27.770	1'28.310	2'56.080	0.549
~~7~~ → 6	(United States) USA	Philip Giebler	1'30.129	1'27.884	1'29.017	1'28.404	2'56.288	0.757
~~8~~ → 7	Canada	James Hinchcliffe	1'29.079	1'28.641	1'28.333	1'27.974	2'56.307	0.776
~~9~~ → 8	Netherlands	Jeroen Bleekemolen	1'29.186	1'28.411	1'28.207	1'30.033	2'56.618	1.087
~~10~~ → 9	New Zealand	Matt Halliday	1'29.009	1'29.310	1'28.315	1'28.330	2'56.645	1.114
~~11~~ → 10	Malaysia	Alex Yoong	1'29.390	1'29.387	1'28.501	1'28.395	2'56.896	1.365
~~5~~ → 11	Switzerland	Sébastien Buemi	1'28.905	1'28.765	1'28.298	1'27.777	2'57.063*	0.544
12	Indonesia	Ananda Mikola	1'30.770	1'30.466	1'28.878	1'28.310	2'57.188	1.657
13	Australia	Ryan Briscoe	1'31.561	1'28.761	1'29.184	1'28.548	2'57.309	1.778
14	China	Congfu Cheng	1'31.499	1'28.817	1'29.357	1'28.630	2'57.447	1.916
15	(Republic of Ireland) Ireland	Michael Devaney	1'32.840	1'30.020	1'29.196	1'28.969	2'58.165	2.634
16	Brazil	Tuka Rocha	1'31.998	1'29.045	1'29.598	1'29.373	2'58.418	2.887
17	Italy	Alessandro Pier Guidi	1'30.100	1'29.786	1'29.131	1'29.336	2'58.467	2.936
18	India	Armaan Ebrahim	1:32.795	1'29.465	1'29.522	1'30.358	2'58.987	3.456
19	Lebanon	Basil Shaaban	1'33.008	1'30.147	1'30.268	1'29.861	3'00.008	4.477
20	Singapore	Christian Murchison	1'31.370	1'31.853	1'29.998	1'30.628	3'00.626	5.095
21	Greece	Takis Kaitatzis	1:31.861	1:31.561	1:29.821	1:41.652	3:01.382	5.851
22	Czech Republic	Tomas Kostka	1:31.583	1:30.643	1:30.930	1:32.039	3:01.573	6.042
23	Pakistan	Nur B. Ali	1:37.356	1:34.135	1:33.677	--	3:07.812	12.281

- After a technical oversight, the fastest time for A1 Team Switzerland was disallowed, adjusting their starting position from 5th to 11th.

== Results ==
=== Sprint Race Results ===
The Sprint Race took place on Sunday, October 1, 2006

Pos	Team	Driver	Laps	Time	Points
1	South Africa	Adrian Zaugg	12	18'03.570	7
2	Mexico	Salvador Durán	12	+2.272	5
3	France	Nicolas Lapierre	12	+2.934	4
4	Germany	Nico Hülkenberg	12	+6.190	3
5	(United Kingdom) Great Britain	Darren Manning	12	+12.007	2
6	New Zealand	Matt Halliday	12	+14.940	1
7	(United States) USA	Philip Giebler	12	+22.438	
8	Canada	James Hinchcliffe	12	+23.771	
9	Netherlands	Jeroen Bleekemolen	12	+24.281	
10	Switzerland	Sébastien Buemi	12	+24.778	
11	China	Congfu Cheng	12	+25.325	
12	Malaysia	Alex Yoong	12	+25.885	
13	Australia	Ryan Briscoe	12	+26.666	
14	Brazil	Tuka Rocha	12	+28.317	
15	(Republic of Ireland) Ireland	Michael Devaney	12	+38.351	
16	Lebanon	Basil Shaaban	12	+44.165	
17	Czech Republic	Tomas Kostka	12	+44.763	
18	Greece	Takis Kaitatzis	12	+1'09.669	
19	Indonesia	Ananda Mikola	12	+1'14.939	
20	Pakistan	Nur B. Ali	11	+1 lap	
Not classified
21	Singapore	Christian Murchison	4	+8 laps	
22	India	Armaan Ebrahim	0	+12 laps	
23	Italy	Alessandro Pier Guidi	0	+12 laps	

- Zaugg was awarded extra point for fastest lap out of the two races.

Feature race grid

New for the 2006/07 season is the way to determine the feature race order. The grid is determined on three factors:

1. The driver’s grid position for the Sprint race.
2. The driver’s final position in the Sprint race.
3. The fastest lap time in the Sprint race.

Points are awarded for each element. If a driver started the Sprint race on pole, he would be awarded one point, if he started the race second he would get two points, right down to the 23rd on the grid who will get 23 points.

The same occurs for the race positions – the winner gets one point, the runner-up two and third three points, right down to the last finisher who scores 23. Similarly for the fastest laps; the fastest gets one point, the second two and so on.

The points are all added together after the end of the sprint race; the driver with the lowest number of points will start the Feature race on pole.

If two teams finish on the same number of points after the calculations, the driver who achieved a higher finish position in the Sprint race will be awarded the better starting position.

Pos	Team	Driver	Sprint Grid	Sprint Race	Sprint F.L.	Total
1	South Africa	Adrian Zaugg	1	1	1	3
2	Mexico	Salvador Durán	2	2	2	6
3	France	Nicolas Lapierre	3	3	3	9
4	Germany	Nico Hülkenberg	4	4	4	12
5	(United Kingdom) Great Britain	Darren Manning	5	5	5	15
6	New Zealand	Matt Halliday	9	6	6	21
7	(United States) USA	Philip Giebler	6	7	8	21
8	Canada	James Hinchcliffe	7	8	13	28
9	Switzerland	Sébastien Buemi	11	10	7	28
10	Netherlands	Jeroen Bleekemolen	8	9	15	32
11	Malaysia	Alex Yoong	10	12	10	32
12	China	Congfu Cheng	14	11	11	36
13	Brazil	Tuka Rocha	16	14	9	39
14	Australia	Ryan Briscoe	13	13	14	40
15	(Republic of Ireland) Ireland	Michael Devaney	15	15	12	42
16	Indonesia	Ananda Mikola	12	19	16	47
17	Lebanon	Basil Shaaban	19	16	18	53
18	Czech Republic	Tomas Kostka	22	17	17	56
19	Greece	Takis Kaitatzis	21	18	20	59
20	Singapore	Christian Murchison	20	21	19	60
21	India	Armaan Ebrahim	18	22	22	62
22	Italy	Alessandro Pier Guidi	17	23	23	63
23	Pakistan	Nur B. Ali	23	20	21	64

=== Main Race Results ===
The Main Race took place also on Sunday, October 1, 2006.

Pos	Team	Driver	Laps	Time	Points
1	Germany	Nico Hülkenberg	41	1:10'31.238	10
2	(United States) USA	Philip Giebler	41	+7.870	9
3	Australia	Ryan Briscoe	41	+33.619	8
4	Netherlands	Jeroen Bleekemolen	41	+35.873	7
5	Mexico	Salvador Durán	41	+40.321	6
6	Italy	Alessandro Pier Guidi	41	+42.616	5
7	(United Kingdom) Great Britain	Darren Manning	41	+54.333	4
8	Switzerland	Sébastien Buemi	41	+59.382	3
9	China	Congfu Cheng	41	+1'29.659	2
10	Indonesia	Ananda Mikola	41	+1'14.939	1
11	New Zealand	Matt Halliday	41	+1'49.139	
12	Brazil	Tuka Rocha	40	+1 lap	
13	Canada	James Hinchcliffe	40	+1 lap	
14	(Republic of Ireland) Ireland	Michael Devaney	40	+1 lap	
15	Greece	Takis Kaitatzis	40	+1 lap	
16	Singapore	Christian Murchison	40	+1 lap	
17	Malaysia	Alex Yoong	37	+4 laps	
Not classified
DNF	India	Armaan Ebrahim	34	+7 laps	
DNF	France	Nicolas Lapierre	31	+10 laps	
DNF	Czech Republic	Tomas Kostka	25	+16 laps	
DNF	Lebanon	Basil Shaaban	18	+23 laps	
DNF	Pakistan	Nur B. Ali	17	+24 laps	
DNF	South Africa	Adrian Zaugg	0	+41 laps	

=== Total Points ===
Total points awarded:

Team	Points	SR	MR	FL
Germany	13	3	10	
Mexico	11	5	6	
(United States) USA	9		9	
Australia	8		8	
Netherlands	7		7	
South Africa	7	6		1
(United Kingdom) Great Britain	6	2	4	
Italy	5		5	
France	4	4		
Switzerland	3		3	
China	2		2	
Indonesia	1		1	
New Zealand	1	1		
Brazil				
Canada				
Czech Republic				
Greece				
India				
(Republic of Ireland) Ireland				
Lebanon				
Malaysia				
Pakistan				
Singapore				

- Fastest Lap: Adrian Zaugg, A1 Team South Africa, 1'29.125 (186.9 km/h) on lap 7 of Sprint Race
