= 2007 Taupo A1GP round =

Auto Race

2006-07 A1GP of New Zealand

Race Details
- Race 6 of 11 in the 2006-07 A1 Grand Prix season
- Date: 21 January 2007
- Location: Taupo Motorsport Park; Taupō, New Zealand
- Weather: Dry and Sunny

Qualifying
- Pole: Germany (Nico Hülkenberg)
- Time: 2'28.218 (1:14.146, 1:14.072)

Sprint Race
- 1st: Germany (Nico Hülkenberg)
- 2nd: France (Loïc Duval)
- 3rd: New Zealand (Jonny Reid)

Main Race
- 1st: Germany (Nico Hülkenberg)
- 2nd: France (Loïc Duval)
- 3rd: New Zealand (Jonny Reid)

Fast Lap
- FL: Germany (Nico Hülkenberg)
- Time: 1'14.742, (Lap 15 of Main Race)

Official Classifications

Layout of the Taupo Motorsport Park

The 2006–07 A1 Grand Prix of Nations, New Zealand is an A1 Grand Prix race, held on 21 January 2007 at Taupo Motorsport Park, New Zealand. The sixth race in the 2006–07 A1 Grand Prix season and the first meeting held at the circuit.

== Results ==
=== Sprint Race results ===
The Sprint Race took place on Sunday, 21 January 2007

Pos	Team	Driver	Laps	Time	Points
1	Germany	Nico Hülkenberg	14	19'49.089	6
2	France	Loïc Duval	14	+3.747	5
3	New Zealand	Jonny Reid	14	+ 4.215	4
4	Netherlands	Jeroen Bleekemolen	14	+ 7.532	3
5	Switzerland	Sébastien Buemi	14	+ 7.802	2
6	Canada	James Hinchcliffe	14	+ 8.809	1
7	South Africa	Alan van der Merwe	14	+ 16.324	
8	(United Kingdom) Great Britain	Robbie Kerr	14	+ 29.093	
9	Italy	Enrico Toccacelo	14	+ 29.517	
10	India	Narain Karthikeyan	14	+ 29.631	
11	(United States) USA	Ryan Hunter-Reay	14	+30.137	
12	Mexico	Salvador Duran	14	+ 30.534	
13	China	Ho-Pin Tung	14	+ 31.430	
14	Australia	Karl Reindler	14	+ 31.686	
15	Indonesia	Ananda Mikola	14	+ 32.776	
16	Brazil	Raphael Matos	14	+ 35.807	
17	Czech Republic	Tomáš Enge	14	+ 51.547	
18	Pakistan	Nur B. Ali	14	+ 1:10.910	
19	Malaysia	Alex Yoong	13	+ 1 lap	
DNF	(Republic of Ireland) Ireland	Richard Lyons	6	+ 8 laps	
DNF	Lebanon	Alexander Khateeb	6	+ 8 laps	
DNF	(Singapore) SIngapore	Christian Murchison	0	+ 14 laps	

=== Feature Race results ===
The Feature Race took place on Sunday, 21 January 2007

Pos	Team	Driver	Laps	Time/Retired	Points
1	Germany	Nico Hülkenberg	50	1:03'38.100	10
2	France	Loïc Duval	50	+19.511	9
3	New Zealand	Jonny Reid	50	+ 19.927	8
4	Switzerland	Sébastien Buemi	50	+ 20.856	7
5	Netherlands	Jeroen Bleekemolen	50	+ 21.351	6
6	Canada	James Hinchcliffe	50	+ 21.808	5
7	India	Narain Karthikeyan	50	+ 30.759	4
8	Italy	Enrico Toccacelo	50	+ 31.474	3
9	China	Ho-Pin Tung	50	+ 45.737	2
10	(United States) USA	Ryan Hunter-Reay	50	+ 48.541	1
11	Malaysia	Alex Yoong	50	+49.235	
12	Czech Republic	Tomáš Enge	50	+ 1:06.105	
13	Australia	Karl Reindler	50	+ 1:12.628	
14	Brazil	Raphael Matos	49	+ 1 lap	
15	Singapore	Christian Murchison	49	+ 1 lap	
16	South Africa	Alan van der Merwe	49	+ 1 lap	
17	Lebanon	Alexander Khateeb	48	+ 1 lap	
18	Pakistan	Nur B. Ali	46	+ 4 laps	
DNF	(Republic of Ireland) Ireland	Richard Lyons	45	Spun out	
DNF	Mexico	Salvador Duran	42	+ 8 laps	
DNF	(United Kingdom) Great Britain	Robbie Kerr	40	Gearbox	
DNF	Indonesia	Ananda Mikola	8	+ 42 laps	

=== Total Points ===
Total points awarded:

Team	Points	SR	MR	FL
Germany	17	6	10	1
France	14	5	9	
New Zealand	12	4	8	
Switzerland	9	2	7	
Netherlands	9	3	6	
Canada	6	1	5	
India	4		4	
Italy	3		3	
China	2		2	
(United States) USA	1		1	

- Fastest Lap: Germany
