= 2007 Eastern Creek A1GP round =

2006–07 A1GP of Australia

Race Details
- Race 7 of 11 in the 2006–07 A1 Grand Prix season
- Date: 4 February 2007
- Location: Eastern Creek Raceway; Sydney, New South Wales, Australia
- Weather: Partly cloudy, 27 °C

Qualifying
- Pole: Germany (Nico Hülkenberg)
- Time: 2:36.225 (1:17.962, 1:18.263)

Sprint Race
- 1st: Germany (Nico Hülkenberg)
- 2nd: New Zealand (Jonny Reid)
- 3rd: France (Loïc Duval)

Main Race
- 1st: Germany (Nico Hülkenberg)
- 2nd: New Zealand (Jonny Reid)
- 3rd: China (Ho-Pin Tung)

Fast Lap
- FL: [[A1 Team |]] ()
- Time: , (Lap of Race)

Official Classifications
- [ Prac1-A] ·[ Prac1-B] ·[ Prac2] ·[ Prac3] ·[ Qual] ·[ SRace] ·[ MRace]

Layout of the Eastern Creek Raceway

The 2006–07 A1 Grand Prix of Nations, Australia was an A1 Grand Prix race held on 4 February 2007 at Eastern Creek Raceway in Sydney, Australia. This was the seventh race in the 2006–07 A1 Grand Prix season and the second meeting held at the circuit. Nico Hülkenberg, who won both the Sprint and Main races, set the still standing (as of March 2013) outright lap record for the original 3.93 km (2.44 mi) long circuit with a time of 1:19.1420 in his A1 Team Germany Lola A1GP Zytek.

== Results ==
=== Sprint Race results ===
The Sprint Race took place on Sunday, 4 February 2007

Pos	Team	Driver	Laps	Time	Points
1	Germany	Nico Hülkenberg	14	20'13.223	6
2	New Zealand	Jonny Reid	14	+ 2.154	5
3	France	Loïc Duval	14	+ 7.831	4
4	Switzerland	Sébastien Buemi	14	+ 10.885	3
5	Netherlands	Jeroen Bleekemolen	14	+ 12.137	2
6	China	Ho-Pin Tung	14	+ 13.092	1
7	Malaysia	Alex Yoong	14	+ 13.548	
8	(United States) USA	Philip Giebler	14	+ 14.254	
9	Czech Republic	Tomáš Enge	14	+ 14.929	
10	(Republic of Ireland) Ireland	Richard Lyons	14	+ 15.874	
11	Mexico	Salvador Duran	14	+ 16.336	
12	(Singapore) SIngapore	Christian Murchison	14	+ 16.764	
13	Canada	James Hinchcliffe	14	+ 17.611	
14	Australia	Karl Reindler	14	+ 17.696	
15	Italy	Enrico Toccacelo	14	+ 19.424	
16	South Africa	Alan van der Merwe	14	+ 19.814	
17	Indonesia	Ananda Mikola	14	+ 20.551	
18	India	Parthiva Sureshwaren	14	+ 29.228	
19	(United Kingdom) Great Britain	Robbie Kerr	13	+ 1 lap	
20	Pakistan	Nur B. Ali	12	+ 2 laps	
21	Brazil	Tuka Rocha	11	+ 3 laps	
DNF	Lebanon	Alexander Khateeb	5	+ 9 laps	

=== Feature Race results ===
The Feature Race took place on Sunday, 4 February 2007

Pos	Team	Driver	Laps	Time	Points
1	Germany	Nico Hülkenberg	46	1:08'35.139	10
2	New Zealand	Jonny Reid	46	+ 7.613	9
3	China	Ho-Pin Tung	46	+ 26.076	8
4	Netherlands	Jeroen Bleekemolen	46	+ 33.702	7
5	Czech Republic	Tomáš Enge	46	+ 38.277	6
6	Malaysia	Alex Yoong	46	+ 42.051	5
7	Switzerland	Sébastien Buemi	46	+ 43.651	4
8	(United States) USA	Philip Giebler	46	+ 44.192	3
9	France	Loïc Duval	46	+ 46.237	2
10	(United Kingdom) Great Britain	Robbie Kerr	46	+ 50.101	1
11	Brazil	Tuka Rocha	46	+ 50.939	
12	Italy	Enrico Toccacelo	46	+ 54.269	
13	Indonesia	Ananda Mikola	46	+ 55.695	
14	Australia	Karl Reindler	46	+ 1:05.193	
15	Mexico	Salvador Duran	45	+ 1 lap	
16	India	Parthiva Sureshwaren	45	+ 1 lap	
17	Lebanon	Alexander Khateeb	41	+ 5 laps	
DNF	(Republic of Ireland) Ireland	Richard Lyons	22	+ 24 laps	
DNF	Pakistan	Nur B. Ali	6	+ 40 laps	
DNF	South Africa	Alan van der Merwe	4	+ 42 laps	
DNF	Canada	James Hinchcliffe	0	+ 46 laps	
DNF	Singapore	Christian Murchison	0	+ 46 laps	

=== Total Points ===
Total points awarded:

Team	Points	SR	MR	FL
Germany	17	6	10	1
New Zealand	14	5	9	
China	9	1	8	
Netherlands	9	2	7	
Switzerland	7	3	4	
France	6	4	2	
Czech Republic	6		6	
Malaysia	5		5	
United States	3		3	
(United Kingdom) Great Britain	1		1	

- Fastest Lap: Germany
