= A1 Team Singapore =

- Singapore
- Founded: 2006
- Seat holder(s): Krishna Ramachandra, Ben Neo, Alex Yeo, R. Sasikumar, Janet Tan-Collis, Tsung Yan Soo, Tan Su Shan
- Team principal: Krishna Ramachandra
- Race driver(s): Christian Murchison; Denis Lian
- First race: 2006-07 Netherlands
- Rounds entered: 7
- Championships: 0
- Sprint race victories: 0
- Feature race victories: 0
- Pole positions: 0
- Fastest laps: 0
- Total points: 3
- 2006-07 position: 20th (3 pts)

A1 Team Singapore represented Singapore in the A1 Grand Prix motor racing championship.

== History ==
Singapore's participation in A1GP came as a result of founder Maktoum Hasher Maktoum Al Maktoum approaching the state government about hosting a round of the inaugural season in the city state. The Singaporean authorities turned down the offer on the basis that it was too risky to close the city for a street race run by an unproven championship, and instead opted to enter a team.

The outfit struggled to find sponsorship to fund set-up, going so far as to advertise in The New Paper. Singapore missed the deadline to enter the first season, but found support from lawyer Krishna Ramachandra, footballer R. Sasikumar and 300 citizens who pledged SG$50 in exchange for their names to be stickered onto the rear wing ahead of their debut in the 2006–07 season. West Surrey Racing were contracted to operate the team.

Former Formula Asia champion Denis Lian, kart racer Hafiz Koh and Australian-based Christian Murchison were announced as the teams' drivers, with Murchison's inclusion controversial as he had defaulted his National Service through his Australian residency. The team was scheduled to complete a pre-season test with all three drivers at Elvington Airfield on 21 September 2006, but was cancelled after Richard Hammond's near-fatal crash the day before.

Lian was entered to race in the first round at Zandvoort, but was withdrawn having contracted tonsillitis between practice and qualifying. Murchison replaced him with no prior testing, qualified 20th of 23, was crashed into by Ananda Mikola of Indonesia in the sprint race and finished 16th in the feature race having stalled at the start. Lian returned to the car a week later in Brno, he qualified 21st and finished 18th in the sprint race. Unfortunately he spun on the opening lap of the feature race but still managed to recover and finished 19th. Murchison replaced Lian for the chaotic Beijing round, and finished 8th out of nine classified finishers in the feature race to score three points.

Having failed to attract support from Singaporean corporations, financial difficulties beset the team ahead of the Malaysian round – resulting in the series' parent company A1 Holdings taking control of the team and the firing of Lian and Koh. Murchison finished 11th in the feature race following a race-long battle with Ireland's Michael Devaney, therefore missing out on the prize money that came with a top-10 finish. Murchison then injured his back in training ahead of the next round in Indonesia. Devoid of all sponsorship and national symbols, the team struggled through the Australasian leg of the series before making their last appearance in Durban – but Murchison spun in qualifying, crashed on his own in the sprint race and tangled with the stalled Italian car off the grid in the feature race.

The team withdrew from the final three rounds, citing Murchison's back injury. It did not return for the 2007–08 season, with any available domestic funding diverted to financing the inaugural Singapore Grand Prix.

== Drivers ==
Name	Seasons	Races (Starts)	A1GP Title	Wins	Sprint wins	Main wins	2nd	3rd	Poles	Fastest Laps	Points
Denis Lian	2006–07	1 (2)									0
Christian Murchison	2006–07	6 (12)									3

== Complete A1 Grand Prix results ==
(key), "spr" indicate a Sprint Race, "fea" indicate a Main Race.

Year	Racing team	Chassis, Engine, Tyres	Drivers	1	2	3	4	5	6	7	8	9	10	11	12	13	14	15	16	17	18	19	20	21	22	Points	Rank
2006–07	West Surrey Racing	Lola, Zytek, Cooper Avon		NED spr	NED fea	CZE spr	CZE fea	BEI spr	BEI fea	MYS spr	MYS fea	IDN spr	IDN fea	NZ spr	NZ fea	AUS spr	AUS fea	ZAF spr	ZAF fea	MEX spr	MEX fea	SHA spr	SHA fea	GBR spr	GBR fea	3	20th
2006–07	West Surrey Racing	Lola, Zytek, Cooper Avon	Christian Murchison	Ret	16			16	8	15	11			Ret	15	12	Ret	Ret	Ret							3	20th
2006–07	West Surrey Racing	Lola, Zytek, Cooper Avon	Denis Lian			18	19																			3	20th
