= 2007 Shanghai A1GP round =

2006-07 A1GP of Shanghai, China

Race Details
- Race 10 of 11 in the 2006-07 A1 Grand Prix season
- Date: April 15, 2007
- Location: Shanghai International Circuit; Shanghai, China
- Weather: cloudy

Qualifying
- Pole: Great Britain (Robbie Kerr)
- Time: 3:10.138 (1:35.382, 1:34.756)

Sprint Race
- 1st: Great Britain (Robbie Kerr)
- 2nd: New Zealand (Jonny Reid)
- 3rd: Germany (Nico Hülkenberg)

Main Race
- 1st: New Zealand (Jonny Reid)
- 2nd: Great Britain (Robbie Kerr)
- 3rd: Germany (Nico Hülkenberg)

Fast Lap
- FL: New Zealand (Jonny Reid)
- Time: 1:36.033, (Lap 7 of Sprint Race)

Official Classifications
- Prac1-A ·Prac1-B ·Prac2 ·Prac3 ·Qual ·SRace ·MRace

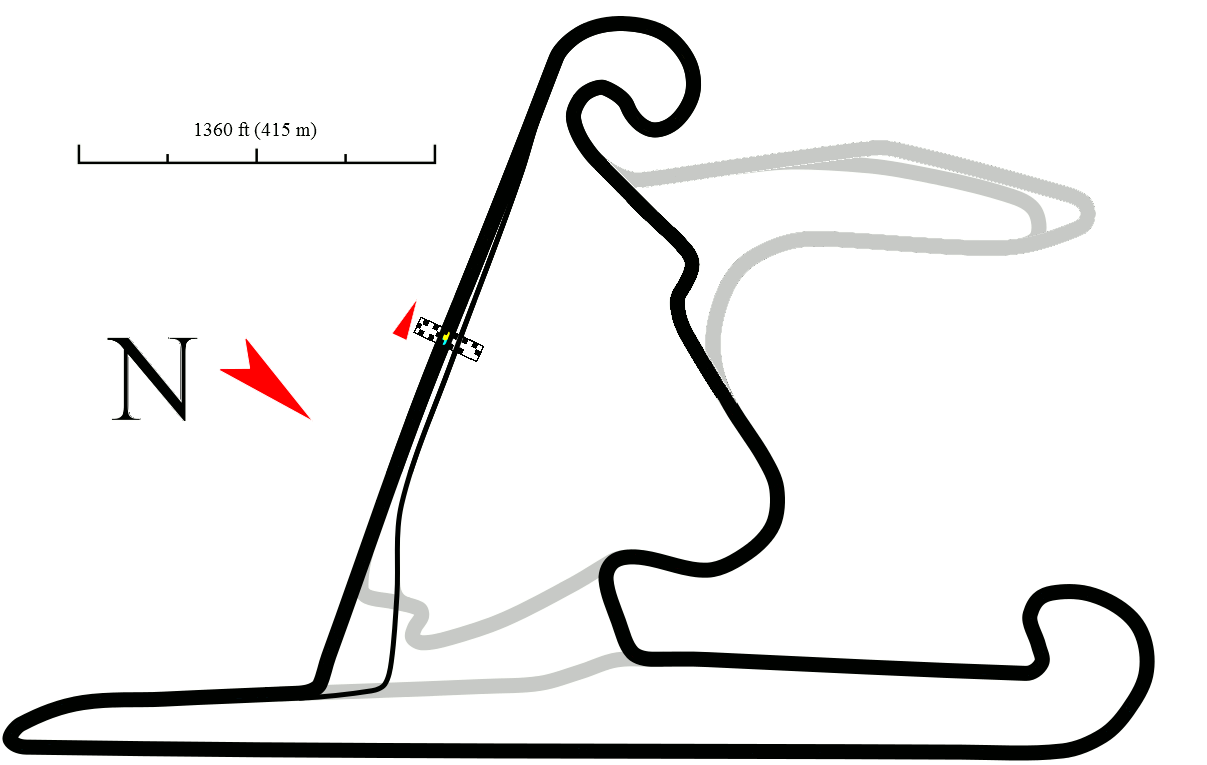
Layout of the Shanghai International Circuit intermediate circuit

The 2006–07 A1 Grand Prix of Nations, Shanghai, China was an A1 Grand Prix race, held on April 15, 2007 at the Shanghai International Circuit, China. This was the tenth race in the 2006-07 A1 Grand Prix season and the second meeting held at the circuit and also the second race in China this season.

== Results ==
=== Qualification ===
Pos	Team	Driver	Q1 Time	Q2 Time	Q3 Time	Q4 Time	Aggregate	Gap
1	(United Kingdom) Great Britain	Robbie Kerr	1'35.717	1'35.921	1'35.382	1'34.756	3'10.138	--
2	New Zealand	Jonny Reid	1'35.453	1'35.286	1'35.525	1'35.253	3'10.539	0.401
3	(United States) USA	Jonathan Summerton	1'35.390	1'36.077	1'35.469	1'35.410	3'10.800	0.662
4	Germany	Nico Hülkenberg	1'35.562	1'35.802	1'35.923	1'35.491	3:11.053	0.915
5	India	Narain Karthikeyan	1'36.352	1'37.999	1'35.457	1'35.726	3'11.183	1.045
6	Switzerland	Sébastien Buemi	1'36.037	1'35.698	1'35.984	1'35.603	3'11.301	1.163
7	France	Jean Karl Vernay	1'36.056	1'36.446	1'36.092	1'35.469	3'11.525	1.387
8	Malaysia	Alex Yoong	1'35.836	1'35.829	1'35.719	1'35.844	3'11.548	1.410
9	Canada	Sean McIntosh	1'36.950	1'36.601	1'36.057	1'35.798	3'11.855	1.717
10	Italy	Enrico Toccacelo	1'36.771	1'35.983	1'36.041	1'36.165	3'12.023	1.885
11	South Africa	Alan van der Merwe	1'36.604	1'36.773	1'36.241	1'36.977	3'12.218	2.080
12	China	Congfu Cheng	1'36.409	1'36.314	1'36.090	1'36.204	3'12.294	2.156
13	Indonesia	Ananda Mikola	1'37.067	1'36.969	1'36.457	1'35.902	3'12.359	2.191
14	Netherlands	Renger van der Zande	1'36.931	1'36.551	1'36.547	1'35.969	3'12.426	2.288
15	Brazil	Vítor Meira	1'36.581	1'36.563	1'36.786	1'35.982	3'12.545	2.407
16	Mexico	Sergio Pérez	1'38.110	1'38.009	1'37.098	1'36.523	3'13.621	3.483
17	(Republic of Ireland) Ireland	Richard Lyons	1'37.077	1'37.569	1'36.914	1'36.842	3'13.756	3.618
18	Portugal	Joao Urbano	1'37.252	1'37.308	1'37.075	1'36.707	3'13.782	3.644
19	Lebanon	Allam Khodair	1'37.401	1'37.070	1'36.748	No Time	3'13.818	3.680
20	Czech Republic	Filip Salaquarda	1'38.888	1'37.817	1'37.976	1'36.980	3'14.797	4.599
21	Australia	Ian Dyk	1'38.830	1'37.922	1'37.419	No Time	3'15.341	5.203
22	Pakistan	Nur Ali	1'40.732	1'40.039	1'39.171	1'39.630	3'18.801	8.663

=== Sprint Race Results ===
The Sprint took place on Sunday, April 15, 2007

Pos	Team	Driver	Laps	Time	Points
1	(United Kingdom) Great Britain	Robbie Kerr	10	16:04.825	6
2	New Zealand	Jonny Reid	10	+0.385	5
3	Germany	Nico Hülkenberg	10	+2.515	4
4	Switzerland	Sébastien Buemi	10	+6.123	3
5	(United States) USA	Jonathan Summerton	10	+7.107	2
6	Malaysia	Alex Yoong	10	+11.157	1
7	India	Narain Karthikeyan	10	+11.826	
8	South Africa	Alan van der Merwe	10	+16.753	
9	Netherlands	Renger van der Zande	10	+17.137	
10	Italy	Enrico Toccacelo	10	+18.201	
11	China	Congfu Cheng	10	+18.790	
12	(Republic of Ireland) Ireland	Richard Lyons	10	+19.407	
13	Indonesia	Ananda Mikola	10	+21.555	
14	Brazil	Vítor Meira	10	+24.231	
15	Mexico	Sergio Pérez	10	+25.046	
16	Australia	Ian Dyk	10	+28.852	
17	Czech Republic	Filip Salaquarda	10	+29.091	
18	Lebanon	Allam Khodair	10	+30.482	
19	Portugal	Joao Urbano	10	+33.789	
20	Pakistan	Nur Ali	10	+49.433	
DNF	Canada	Sean McIntosh	7	+ 3 laps	
DNF	France	Jean Karl Vernay	7	+ 3 laps	

=== Feature Race Results ===
The Feature Race took place on Sunday, April 15, 2007

Pos	Team	Driver	Laps	Time	Points
1	New Zealand	Jonny Reid	38	1:08:13.498	10
2	(United Kingdom) Great Britain	Robbie Kerr	38	+1.567	9
3	Germany	Nico Hülkenberg	38	+3.185	8
4	Netherlands	Renger van der Zande	38	+5.661	7
5	(Republic of Ireland) Ireland	Richard Lyons	38	+10.381	6
6	Canada	Sean McIntosh	38	+12.298	5
7	Italy	Enrico Toccacelo	38	+13.171	4
8	France	Jean Karl Vernay	38	+14.943	3
9	Switzerland	Sébastien Buemi	38	+15.263	2
10	Czech Republic	Filip Salaquarda	38	+21.785	1
11	Malaysia	Alex Yoong	38	+22.331	
12	South Africa	Alan van der Merwe	38	+25.714	
13	Portugal	Joao Urbano	38	+28.900	
14	Lebanon	Allam Khodair	38	+29.276	
15	China	Congfu Cheng	38	+30.395	
16	Indonesia	Ananda Mikola	38	+49.698	
17	India	Narain Karthikeyan	38	+54.586	
18	Pakistan	Nur Ali	36	+2 Laps	
19	Brazil	Vítor Meira	34	+4 Laps	
DNF	(United States) USA	Jonathan Summerton	24	+14 Laps	
DNF	Australia	Ian Dyk	17	+21 Laps	
DNF	Mexico	Sergio Pérez	2	+36 Laps	

=== Total Points ===
- Fastest Lap:
