= 2007 Durban A1GP round =

2006-07 A1GP of South Africa

Race Details
- Race 8 of 11 in the 2006-07 A1 Grand Prix season
- Date: 25 February 2007
- Location: Durban street circuit Durban, South Africa

Qualifying
- Pole: Germany (Nico Hülkenberg)
- Time: 2:35.404 (1:17.884, 1:17.520)

Sprint Race
- 1st: Germany (Nico Hülkenberg)
- 2nd: France (Loïc Duval)
- 3rd: New Zealand (Matt Halliday)

Main Race
- 1st: Germany (Nico Hülkenberg)
- 2nd: Great Britain (Robbie Kerr)
- 3rd: New Zealand (Matt Halliday)

Fast Lap
- FL: Germany (Nico Hülkenberg)
- Time: 1:18.701, (Lap 4 of Sprint Race)

Official Classifications
- Prac1-A ·Prac1-B ·Prac2 ·Prac3 ·Qual ·SRace ·MRace

Layout of the Durban street circuit

The eighth race of the 2006–07 A1 Grand Prix season was held on 25 February 2007 in Durban, South Africa.

== Results ==
The Sprint Race took place on Sunday, 25 February 2007.

Pos	Team	Driver	Laps	Time	Points
1	Germany	Nico Hülkenberg	15	19'57.070	6
2	France	Loïc Duval	15	+ 2.781	5
3	New Zealand	Matt Halliday	15	+ 3.490	4
4	Netherlands	Jeroen Bleekemolen	15	+ 6.356	3
5	Switzerland	Neel Jani	15	+ 10.697	2
6	(Republic of Ireland) Ireland	Richard Lyons	15	+ 14.356	1
7	South Africa	Adrian Zaugg	15	+ 17.109	
8	Portugal	Álvaro Parente	15	+ 18.947	
9	(United Kingdom) Great Britain	Robbie Kerr	15	+ 19.916	
10	Indonesia	Ananda Mikola	15	+ 20.871	
11	Czech Republic	Tomáš Enge	15	+ 22.467	
12	Italy	Enrico Toccacelo	15	+ 23.917	
13	Canada	James Hinchcliffe	15	+ 33.527	
14	China	Ho-Pin Tung	15	+ 42.083	
15	India	Narain Karthikeyan	15	+ 44.085	
16	Australia	Karl Reindler	15	+ 1:17.980	
17	Brazil	Bruno Junqueira	14	+ 1 lap	
18	Pakistan	Nur B. Ali	14	+ 1 lap	
19	Lebanon	Allam Khodair	14	+ 1 lap	
20	(United States) USA	Jonathan Summerton	12	+ 3 laps	
DNF	Mexico	Salvador Duran	9	+ 6 laps	
DNF	Singapore	Christian Murchison	8	+ 7 laps	
DNF	Malaysia	Alex Yoong	0	+ 15 laps	

=== Feature Race results ===
The Feature Race took place on Sunday, 25 February 2007

Pos.	Team	Driver	Laps	Time/Retired	Pts.
1	Germany	Nico Hülkenberg	49	1:10:35.582	10
2	(United Kingdom) Great Britain	Robbie Kerr	49	+9.556	9
3	New Zealand	Matt Halliday	49	+10.519	8
4	Switzerland	Neel Jani	49	+12.642	7
5	Portugal	Álvaro Parente	49	+15.975	6
6	Netherlands	Jeroen Bleekemolen	49	+16.799	5
7	Brazil	Bruno Junqueira	49	+21.868	4
8	Malaysia	Alex Yoong	48	+1 lap	3
9	India	Narain Karthikeyan	45	Gearbox	2
10	Pakistan	Nur Ali	45	+4 laps	1
DNF	Mexico	Salvador Duran	42	Mechanical	
DNF	(Republic of Ireland) Ireland	Richard Lyons	39	Puncture	
DNF	(United States) USA	Jonathan Summerton	33	Crash	
DNF	China	Ho-Pin Tung	27	Gearbox	
DNF	Lebanon	(Brazil) Allam Khodair	24	Mechanical	
DNF	Czech Republic	Tomáš Enge	15	Gearbox	
NC	South Africa	Adrian Zaugg	11	+38 laps	
DNF	Australia	Karl Reindler	8	Crash	
DNF	Indonesia	Ananda Mikola	4	Crash damage	
DNF	France	Loïc Duval	2	Throttle cable	
DNF	Canada	James Hinchcliffe	0	Mechanical	
DNF	Italy	Enrico Toccacelo	0	Stall	
DNF	Singapore	Christian Murchison	0	Crash damage	
