= 2007 Brands Hatch A1GP round =

2006-07 A1GP of Great Britain

Race Details
- Race 11 of 11 in the 2006-07 A1 Grand Prix season
- Date: 29 April 2007
- Location: Brands Hatch; Kent, United Kingdom

Qualifying
- Pole: Great Britain (Robbie Kerr)
- Time: 2:28.899 (1:14.381, 1:14.518)

Sprint Race
- 1st: Great Britain (Robbie Kerr)
- 2nd: Germany (Nico Hülkenberg)
- 3rd: Italy (Enrico Toccacelo)

Main Race
- 1st: Germany (Nico Hülkenberg)
- 2nd: Great Britain (Robbie Kerr)
- 3rd: Italy (Enrico Toccacelo)

Fast Lap
- FL: Great Britain (Robbie Kerr)
- Time: 1:14.923, (Lap 15 of Sprint Race)

Official Classifications
- [ Prac1-A] ·[ Prac1-B] ·[ Prac2] ·[ Prac3] ·[ Qual] ·[ SRace] ·[ MRace]

Layout of the Brands Hatch

The 2006–07 A1 Grand Prix of Nations, Great Britain was an A1 Grand Prix race, held on 29 April 2007 at Brands Hatch, Great Britain. This was the eleventh and final race in the 2006–07 A1 Grand Prix season and the second meeting held at the circuit.

== Results ==
=== Sprint Race results ===
The Sprint Race took place on Sunday, 29 April 2007

| Pos | Team | Driver | Laps | Time | Points |
|---|---|---|---|---|---|
| 1 | (United Kingdom) Great Britain | Robbie Kerr | 15 | 18'51.354 | 6 |
| 2 | Germany | Nico Hülkenberg | 15 | + 8.331 | 5 |
| 3 | Italy | Enrico Toccacelo | 15 | + 13.523 | 4 |
| 4 | France | Loïc Duval | 15 | + 17.112 | 3 |
| 5 | Malaysia | Alex Yoong | 15 | + 21.735 | 2 |
| 6 | Netherlands | Jeroen Bleekemolen | 15 | + 22.191 | 1 |
| 7 | India | Narain Karthikeyan | 15 | + 22.558 | |
| 8 | (Republic of Ireland) Ireland | Richard Lyons | 15 | + 29.185 | |
| 9 | (United States) USA | Jonathan Summerton | 15 | + 29.558 | |
| 10 | Canada | Sean McIntosh | 15 | + 30.550 | |
| 11 | Portugal | Álvaro Parente | 15 | + 30.725 | |
| 12 | Brazil | Bruno Junqueira | 15 | + 31.114 | |
| 13 | Czech Republic | Jan Charouz | 15 | + 36.602 | |
| 14 | Australia | Ian Dyk | 15 | + 38.295 | |
| 15 | South Africa | Adrian Zaugg | 15 | + 59.694 | |
| 16 | New Zealand | Matt Halliday | 15 | + 1:04.903 | |
| 17 | Indonesia | Moreno Soeprapto | 15 | + 1:13.770 | |
| 18 | Mexico | Juan Pablo Garcia | 14 | + 1 lap | |
| DNF | Lebanon | Allam Khodair | 11 | + 4 laps | |
| DNF | Switzerland | Sébastien Buemi | 8 | + 7 laps | |
| DNF | Pakistan | Nur B. Ali | 4 | + 11 laps | |
| DNF | China | Congfu Cheng | 2 | + 13 laps | |

=== Feature Race results ===
The Feature Race took place on Sunday, 29 April 2007

| Pos | Team | Driver | Laps | Time | Points |
|---|---|---|---|---|---|
| 1 | Germany | Nico Hülkenberg | 50 | 1:11:01.907 | 10 |
| 2 | (United Kingdom) Great Britain | Robbie Kerr | 50 | +0.619 | 9 |
| 3 | Italy | Enrico Toccacelo | 50 | +18.534 | 8 |
| 4 | India | Narain Karthikeyan | 50 | +18.797 | 7 |
| 5 | Netherlands | Jeroen Bleekemolen | 50 | +26.269 | 6 |
| 6 | (United States) USA | Jonathan Summerton | 50 | +28.216 | 5 |
| 7 | France | Loïc Duval | 50 | +35.248 | 4 |
| 8 | New Zealand | Matt Halliday | 50 | +35.485 | 3 |
| 9 | Malaysia | Alex Yoong | 50 | +37.513 | 2 |
| 10 | China | Congfu Cheng | 50 | +46.421 | 1 |
| 11 | Portugal | Álvaro Parente | 50 | +50.850 | |
| 12 | Canada | Sean McIntosh | 49 | + 1 lap | |
| 13 | Lebanon | Allam Khodair | 49 | + 1 lap | |
| 14 | Mexico | Juan Pablo Garcia | 49 | + 1 lap | |
| 15 | Czech Republic | Jan Charouz | 49 | + 1 laps | |
| 16 | Indonesia | Moreno Soeprapto | 49 | + 1 laps | |
| 17 | Pakistan | Nur Ali | 48 | + 2 laps | |
| DNF | Brazil | Bruno Junqueira | 9 | + 41 laps | |
| DNF | Australia | Ian Dyk | 0 | + 50 laps | |
| DNF | South Africa | Adrian Zaugg | 0 | + 50 laps | |
| DSQ | Switzerland | Sébastien Buemi | 50 | Disqualified | |
| DSQ | (Republic of Ireland) Ireland | Richard Lyons | 50 | Disqualified | |

=== Total Points ===
- Fastest Lap:
