= 2007 Mexico City A1GP round =

2006-07 A1GP of Mexico

Race Details
- Race 9 of 11 in the 2006-07 A1 Grand Prix season
- Date: March 25, 2007
- Location: Autódromo Hermanos Rodríguez; Mexico City, Mexico

Qualifying
- Pole: Malaysia (Alex Yoong)
- Time: 2'53.138 (1'26.490, 1'26.648)

Sprint Race
- 1st: Malaysia (Alex Yoong)
- 2nd: Great Britain (Oliver Jarvis)
- 3rd: Australia (Ian Dyk)

Main Race
- 1st: Great Britain (Oliver Jarvis)
- 2nd: USA (Jonathan Summerton)
- 3rd: South Africa (Adrian Zaugg)

Fast Lap
- FL: Mexico (Salvador Duran)
- Time: 1'27.534, (Lap 3 of Sprint Race)

Official Classifications
- Prac1-A ·Prac1-B ·Prac2 ·Prac3 ·Qual ·SRace ·MRace

Layout of the Autódromo Hermanos Rodríguez

The 2006–07 A1 Grand Prix of Nations, Mexico was an A1 Grand Prix race, held on March 25, 2007, at Autódromo Hermanos Rodríguez, Mexico. This was the ninth race in the 2006-07 A1 Grand Prix season and the first meeting held at the circuit.

== Results ==
=== Sprint Race Results ===
The Sprint Race took place on Sunday, March 25, 2007.

| Pos | Team | Driver | Laps | Time | Points |
|---|---|---|---|---|---|
| 1 | Malaysia | Alex Yoong | 12 | 17'44.563 | 6 |
| 2 | (United Kingdom) Great Britain | Oliver Jarvis | 12 | + 2.138 | 5 |
| 3 | Australia | Ian Dyk | 12 | + 6.346 | 4 |
| 4 | South Africa | Adrian Zaugg | 12 | + 9.223 | 3 |
| 5 | (United States) USA | Jonathan Summerton | 12 | + 9.440 | 2 |
| 6 | China | Ho-Pin Tung | 12 | + 12.033 | 1 |
| 7 | Italy | Enrico Toccacelo | 12 | + 13.097 | |
| 8 | Indonesia | Ananda Mikola | 12 | + 14.232 | |
| 9 | Netherlands | Renger van der Zande | 12 | + 14.755 | |
| 10 | Switzerland | Marcel Fässler | 12 | + 15.700 | |
| 11 | India | Narain Karthikeyan | 12 | + 16.891 | |
| 12 | Czech Republic | Jarek Janis | 12 | + 17.921 | |
| 13 | Canada | James Hinchcliffe | 12 | + 27.302 | |
| 14 | Portugal | Álvaro Parente | 12 | + 51.746 | |
| 15 | Pakistan | Nur B. Ali | 12 | + 56.095 | |
| 16 | New Zealand | Jonny Reid | 12 | + 1:15.097 | |
| 17 | Mexico | Salvador Duran | 12 | + 1:20.211 | |
| 18 | Lebanon | Allam Khodair | 11 | + 1 lap | |
| DNF | France | Jean-Karl Vernay | 2 | + 10 laps | |
| DNF | Brazil | Bruno Junqueira | 0 | + 12 laps | |
| DNF | Germany | Christian Vietoris | 0 | + 12 laps | |
| DNF | (Republic of Ireland) Ireland | Richard Lyons | 0 | + 12 laps | |

=== Feature Race Results ===
The Feature Race took place on Sunday, March 25, 2007.

| Pos | Team | Driver | Laps | Time | Points |
|---|---|---|---|---|---|
| 1 | (United Kingdom) Great Britain | Oliver Jarvis | 45 | 1:07'37.362 | 10 |
| 2 | (United States) USA | Jonathan Summerton | 45 | + 0.690 | 9 |
| 3 | South Africa | Adrian Zaugg | 45 | + 10.056 | 8 |
| 4 | Italy | Enrico Toccacelo | 45 | + 14.087 | 7 |
| 5 | Malaysia | Alex Yoong | 45 | + 19.271 | 6 |
| 6 | New Zealand | Jonny Reid | 45 | + 21.641 | 5 |
| 7 | Portugal | Álvaro Parente | 45 | + 23.409 | 4 |
| 8 | Australia | Ian Dyk | 45 | + 34.068 | 3 |
| 9 | Germany | Christian Vietoris | 45 | + 35.311 | 2 |
| 10 | China | Ho-Pin Tung | 45 | + 36.242 | 1 |
| 11 | Indonesia | Ananda Mikola | 45 | + 36.909 | |
| 12 | Czech Republic | Jarek Janis | 45 | + 37.411 | |
| 13 | Brazil | Bruno Junqueira | 45 | + 37.877 | |
| 14 | Switzerland | Marcel Fässler | 45 | + 42.238 | |
| 15 | Canada | James Hinchcliffe | 45 | + 51.139 | |
| 16 | (Republic of Ireland) Ireland | Richard Lyons | 45 | + 1:03.978 | |
| 17 | Netherlands | Jeroen Bleekemolen | 45 | + 1:11.491 | |
| 18 | India | Narain Karthikeyan | 44 | + 1 lap | |
| 19 | Lebanon | Allam Khodair | 44 | + 1 lap | |
| 20 | France | Jean-Karl Vernay | 44 | + 1 laps | |
| 21 | Pakistan | Nur B. Ali | 43 | + 2 laps | |
| DNF | Mexico | Salvador Duran | 14 | + 31 laps | |

=== Total Points ===
- Fastest Lap:
