= A1 Team India =

- India
- Founded: 2005
- Seat holder(s): Narain Karthikeyan
- Team principal: David Sears
- Race driver(s): Armaan Ebrahim; Narain Karthikeyan
- Car nickname: -
- First race: 2005–06 Great Britain
- Rounds entered: 35 (69 starts)
- Championships: 0
- Sprint race victories: 0
- Feature race victories: 2
- Pole positions: 1
- Fastest laps: 0
- Total points: 93
- 2008–09 position: 12th (19 pts)

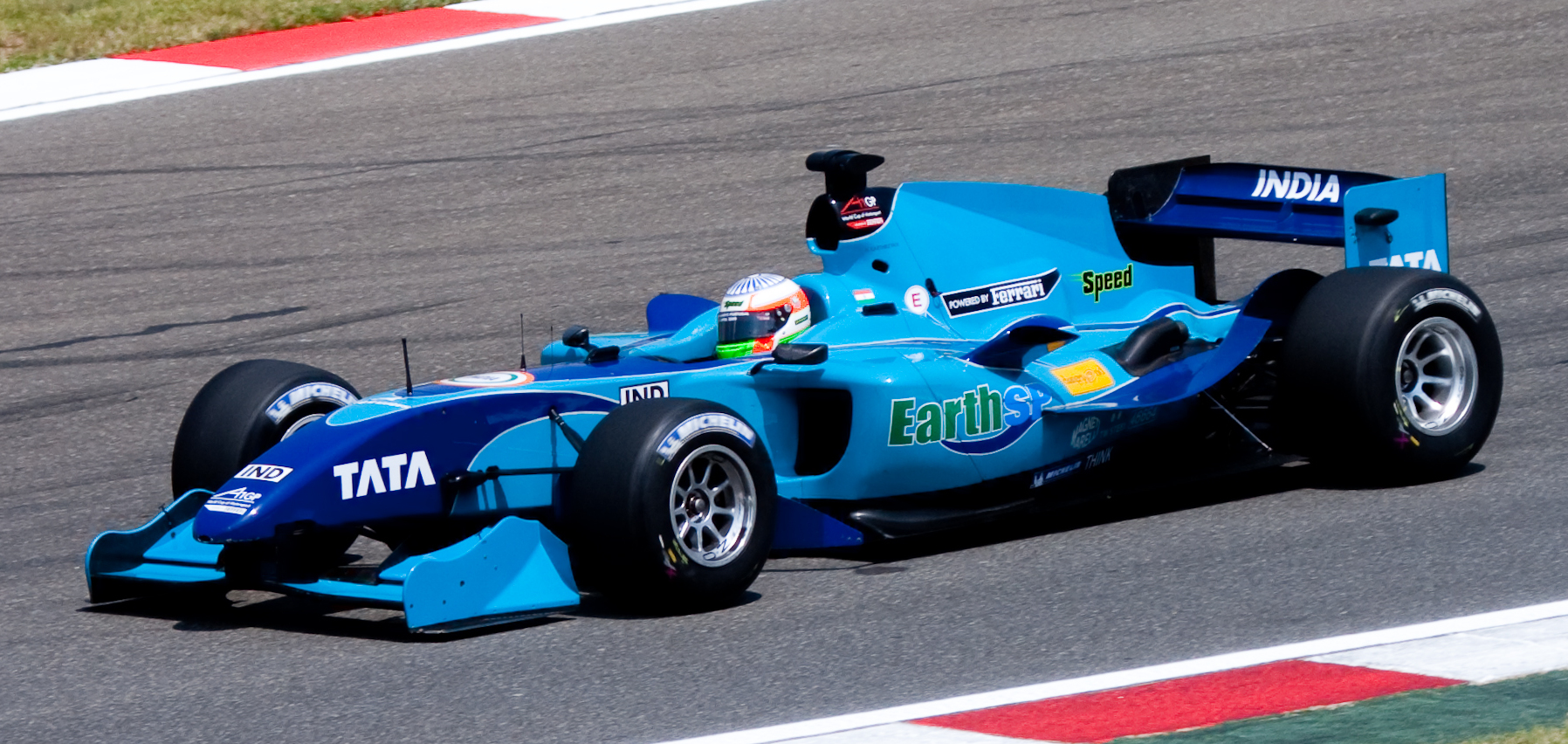
A1 Grand Prix, Kyalami - India

A1 Team India was the Indian team of A1 Grand Prix, an international racing series.

== Management ==
The seatholder for Team India was former Formula One driver Narain Karthikeyan.

Argo racing Cars Ltd. were the Technical Servicer Provider for A1 Team India in Season 4. The UK based team was founded by David Sears and was best known for competing in GP2, and many other single-seater championships. David Sears’ experience lay not only in single-seaters, but in almost all other forms of motorsport. He is considered one of the most widely experienced team principals in recent decades.

Gordon Flynn was the team manager, and Greg Wheeler was the team's race engineer.

Yohann Setna had been involved with A1 Team India since the first season and stood as Sporting Director this year.

== History ==
The inaugural A1 Team India car was presented to the public in July 2005. The team did not take part in the full first season, with their last race in Indonesia. They failed to score any points.

In 2006-07, the team only scored points on three occasions, scoring 13 points total. The 2007–08 season was a much greater success than the previous two seasons. Narain Karthikeyan scored 61 points for the team, as well as two victories.

Despite missing the opening race of the 2008–09 season due to lack of available cars, Team India managed to score a podium in the final Sprint race of the season, en route to scoring 19 points.

== Drivers ==
Name	Seasons	Rounds (Starts)	Titles	Wins	Sprint wins	Feature wins	2nd	3rd	Poles	Fastest Laps	Points
Karun Chandhok	2005–06	2 (3 starts)									0
Armaan Ebrahim	2005–06, 2006–07	11 (22 starts)									0
Narain Karthikeyan	2006–07, 2007–08, 2008–09	20 (40 starts)		2		2	1		1		93
Parthiva Sureshwaren	2006–07, 2007–08	2 (4 starts)									0

== Complete A1 Grand Prix results ==
(key), "spr" indicates the Sprint Race, "fea" indicates the Feature Race.

Year	Racing team	Chassis, Engine, Tyres	Drivers	1	2	3	4	5	6	7	8	9	10	11	12	13	14	15	16	17	18	19	20	21	22	Points	Rank
2005–06	Akbar Ebrahim	Lola, Zytek, Cooper Avon		(United Kingdom) GBR		(Germany) GER		(Portugal) POR		(Australia) AUS		(Malaysia) MYS		(United Arab Emirates) UAE		(South Africa) RSA		(Indonesia) INA		(Mexico) MEX		(United States) USA		(China) CHN		0	24th
2005–06	Akbar Ebrahim	Lola, Zytek, Cooper Avon		spr	fea	spr	fea	spr	fea	spr	fea	spr	fea	spr	fea	spr	fea	spr	fea	spr	fea	spr	fea	spr	fea	0	24th
2005–06	Akbar Ebrahim	Lola, Zytek, Cooper Avon	Karun Chandhok	15	DNS	16	Ret																			0	24th
2005–06	Akbar Ebrahim	Lola, Zytek, Cooper Avon	Armaan Ebrahim					17	13	17	13	11	EX	20	14	14	Ret	18	15							0	24th
2006–07	Arena Motorsport	Lola; Zytek; Cooper Avon		(Netherlands) NED		(Czech Republic) CZE		(China) BEI		(Malaysia) MYS		(Indonesia) INA		(New Zealand) NZL		(Australia) AUS		(South Africa) RSA		(Mexico) MEX		(China) SHA		(United Kingdom) GBR		13	16th
2006–07	Arena Motorsport	Lola; Zytek; Cooper Avon		spr	fea	spr	fea	spr	fea	spr	fea	spr	fea	spr	fea	spr	fea	spr	fea	spr	fea	spr	fea	spr	fea	13	16th
2006–07	Arena Motorsport	Lola; Zytek; Cooper Avon	Armaan Ebrahim	Ret	Ret	17	18	18	11	16	19	18	Ret													13	16th
2006–07	Arena Motorsport	Lola; Zytek; Cooper Avon	Narain Karthikeyan											10	7			15	9	11	18	7	17	7	4	13	16th
2006–07	Arena Motorsport	Lola; Zytek; Cooper Avon	Parthiva Sureshwaren													18	16									13	16th
2007–08	Arena Motorsport	Lola; Zytek; Cooper Avon		(Netherlands) NED		(Czech Republic) CZE		(Malaysia) MYS		(China) ZHU		(New Zealand) NZL		(Australia) AUS		(South Africa) RSA		(Mexico) MEX		(China) SHA		(United Kingdom) GBR				61	10th
2007–08	Arena Motorsport	Lola; Zytek; Cooper Avon		spr	fea	spr	fea	spr	fea	spr	fea	spr	fea	spr	fea	spr	fea	spr	fea	spr	fea	spr	fea			61	10th
2007–08	Arena Motorsport	Lola; Zytek; Cooper Avon	Narain Karthikeyan	10	Ret	21	9	11	6	7	1	10	Ret	11	11			13	9	5	7	5	1			61	10th
2007–08	Arena Motorsport	Lola; Zytek; Cooper Avon	Parthiva Sureshwaren													17	Ret									61	10th
2008–09	Argo Racing Cars	Ferrari, Ferrari, Michelin		(Netherlands) NED		(China) CHN		(Malaysia) MYS		(New Zealand) NZL		(South Africa) RSA		(Portugal) POR		(United Kingdom) GBR										19	12th
2008–09	Argo Racing Cars	Ferrari, Ferrari, Michelin		spr	fea	spr	fea	spr	fea	spr	fea	spr	fea	spr	fea	spr	fea									19	12th
2008–09	Argo Racing Cars	Ferrari, Ferrari, Michelin	Narain Karthikeyan			10	10	Ret	Ret	9	7	6	12	6	11	2	Ret									19	12th
