= A1 Team Pakistan =

- Pakistan
- Founded: 2005
- Seat holder(s): Adam Khan
- Team principal: Arif Hussain
- Race driver(s): Nur Ali opurpaki Enrico Toccacelo
- First race: 2005–06 Great Britain
- Rounds entered: 29
- Championships: 0
- Sprint race victories: 0
- Feature race victories: 0
- Pole positions: 0
- Fastest laps: 0
- Total points: 12

A1 Team Pakistan was the representative team of Pakistan in the former A1 Grand Prix motor racing series.

== History ==
=== 2005–06 season ===
A1 Team Pakistan was launched in front of the Lahore Fort. Pakistan's President Pervez Musharraf was a guest at the event, hosted by A1 Team Pakistan Chairman Arif Hussain and its managing director, Chaudry Salik Hussain. The team was to be run by Super Nova Racing.

Nur Ali was the first driver to be named in A1GP, but was replaced before the first round with British-born driver Adam Khan.

In the first race at Brands Hatch, Adam Khan qualified in 7th place and finished the sprint race in 8th. The team had problems in the pit stop in the feature race and resulted in Khan finishing 13th. Following this, the team failed to score a point until the final race in China where Khan finished fifth. The team missed three rounds after Khan was injured in a practice crash in South Africa, although Enrico Toccacelo was drafted in as a non-scoring substitute driver for said weekend. Pakistan finished 20th in the standings with a total of 10 points.

=== 2006–07 season ===
Khan left the team, and Nur Ali was recalled to race in season two. Swedish outfit Performance Racing took over the running of the team from Super Nova. Ali contested the full season, qualified last at every round (bar Beijing where qualifying was cancelled) and scored the teams' only point as the last classified finisher in the South African feature race.

=== 2007–08 season ===
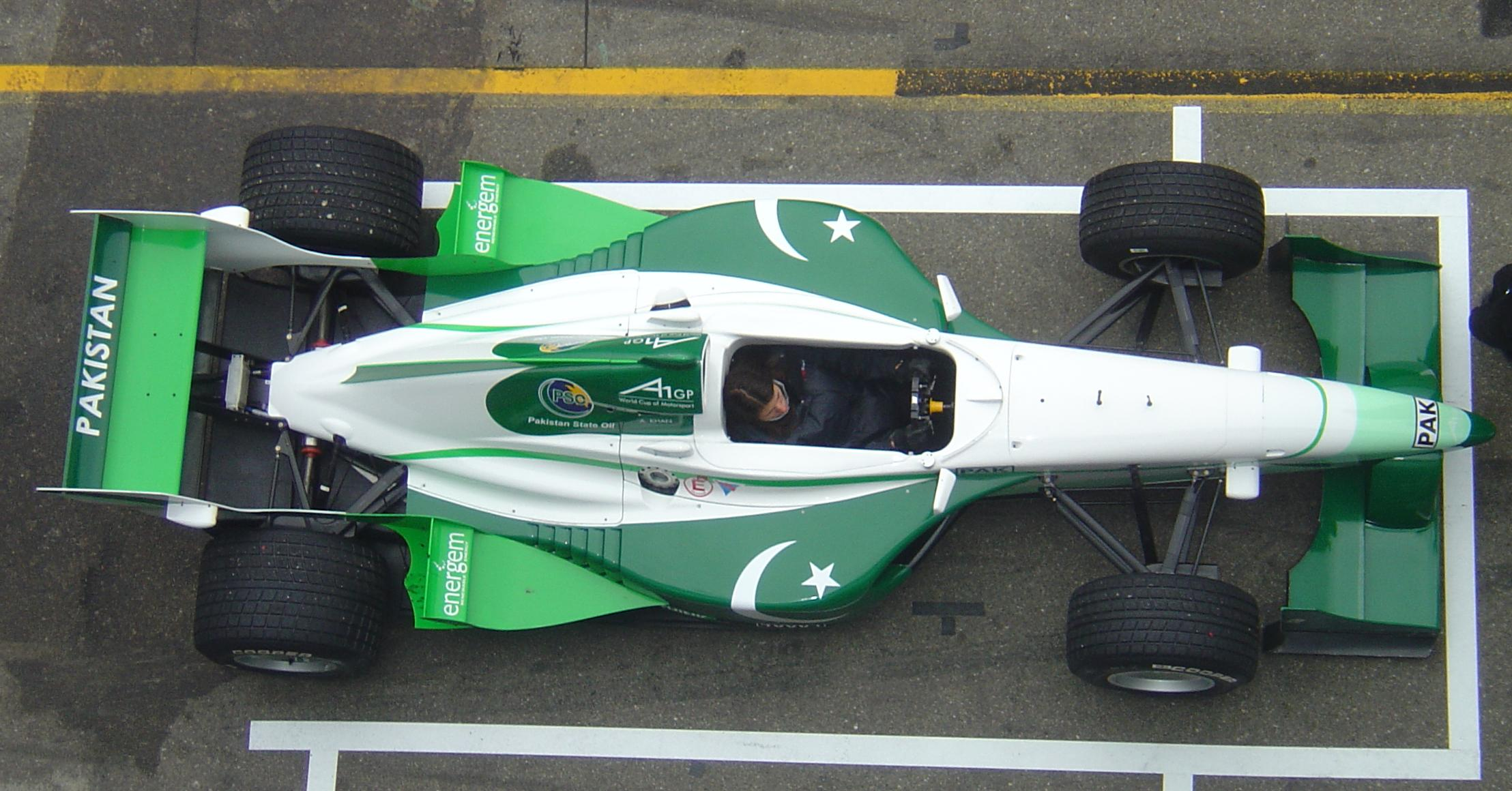
A1 Team Pakistan and their seat holder Adam Khan during a pit stop in 2007.

Khan returned to the squad for season three. Khan's only point of the season came when he finished 10th in the sprint race in New Zealand.

=== 2008–09 season ===
On 10 September 2008, Khan was announced as both the driver and team seat holder for the 2008–09 season. Team Craft took over the running of the team. The team failed to appear at any events that season, initially due to problems with Khan fitting in the new chassis and later due to date-clashes with Khan's duties as demonstration driver for the Renault F1 Team.

== Drivers ==
Name	Seasons	Races (Starts)	A1GP Title	Wins	Sprint wins	Main wins	2nd	3rd	Poles	Fastest Laps	Points
(Pakistan) Nur Ali	2006–07	11 (22)									1
(Pakistan) Adam Khan	2005–06, 2007–08	17 (34)									11
(Italy) Enrico Toccacelo ^{1}	2005–06	1 (2)									0

^{1} Italian driver Enrico Toccacelo from A1 Team Italy, drove the Team Pakistan car in the 2005–06 South African race, after Adam Khan was injured during the practice sessions. Adnan Sarwar Pakistan's first ever local Formula racing driver was also nominated to race for the team but did not carry on with it.

== Complete A1 Grand Prix results ==
(key), "spr" indicate a Sprint Race, "fea" indicate a Main Race.

Year	Racing team	Chassis, Engine, Tyres	Drivers	1	2	3	4	5	6	7	8	9	10	11	12	13	14	15	16	17	18	19	20	21	22	Points	Rank
2005-06	Super Nova Racing	Lola, Zytek, Cooper Avon		GBR spr	GBR fea	GER spr	GER fea	PRT spr	PRT fea	AUS spr	AUS fea	MYS spr	MYS fea	ARE spr	ARE fea	ZAF spr	ZAF fea	IDN spr	IDN fea	MEX spr	MEX fea	USA spr	USA fea	CHN spr	CHN fea	10	20th
2005-06	Super Nova Racing	Lola, Zytek, Cooper Avon	Adam Khan	7	Ret	Ret	12	Ret	15	12	11	13	Ret	16	Ret									12	5	10	20th
2005-06	Super Nova Racing	Lola, Zytek, Cooper Avon	Enrico Toccacelo													11	Ret									10	20th
2006-07	Performance Racing	Lola; Zytek; Cooper Avon		NED spr	NED fea	CZE spr	CZE fea	BEI spr	BEI fea	MYS spr	MYS fea	IDN spr	IDN fea	NZ spr	NZ fea	AUS spr	AUS fea	ZAF spr	ZAF fea	MEX spr	MEX fea	SHA spr	SHA fea	GBR spr	GBR fea	1	22nd
2006-07	Performance Racing	Lola; Zytek; Cooper Avon	Nur Ali	20	Ret	20	Ret	21	Ret	18	21	20	15	18	18	20	Ret	18	10	15	21	20	18	Ret	17	1	22nd
2007-08	Performance Racing	Lola; Zytek; Cooper Avon		NED spr	NED fea	CZE spr	CZE fea	MYS spr	MYS fea	CHN spr	CHN fea	NZ spr	NZ fea	AUS spr	AUS fea	ZAF spr	ZAF fea	MEX spr	MEX fea	SHA spr	SHA fea	GBR spr	GBR fea			1	20th
2007-08	Performance Racing	Lola; Zytek; Cooper Avon	Adam Khan	18	17	15	20	17	14	14	14	10	11	Ret	12	12	Ret	Ret	18	16	17	18	Ret			1	20th
