= A1 Team Lebanon =

- Lebanon
- Founded: 2005
- Seat holder(s): Tameem Auchi
- Team principal: -
- Race driver(s): Daniel Morad
- Car nickname: -
- First race: 2005-06 Great Britain
- Rounds entered: 39 (78 starts)
- Championships: 0
- Sprint race victories: 0
- Feature race victories: 0
- Pole positions: 0
- Fastest laps: 0
- Total points: 8
- 2008-09 position: 17th (8 pts)

A1 Team Lebanon was the Lebanese team of A1 Grand Prix, a former international racing series.

== Management ==
A1 Team Lebanon was led by Tameem Auchi.

== History ==
Daniel Morad became the race driver for A1 Team Lebanon for the 2008-09 season. Although having previously driven in rookie sessions for A1 Team Canada, his Canadian-Lebanese heritage allowed him to switch nationalities, as he had not yet made his race debut.

== Drivers ==
In 2007, several Lebanese fans reacted disappointedly to the decision to drop Beschir, and set up an online petition calling on the team to reinstate him as lead driver.

Name	Seasons	Rounds (Starts)	Titles	Wins	Sprint wins	Feature wins	2nd	3rd	Poles	Fastest Laps	Points
(Australia) Chris Alajajian	2007-08	5 (10 starts)									0
(South Africa) Jimmy Auby	2007-08	2 (4 starts)									0
(Lebanon) Khalil Beschir	2005-06, 2006-07, 2007-08	7 (14 starts)									0
(United Kingdom) Alexander Khateeb	2006-07	2 (4 starts)									0
(Brazil) Allam Khodair	2006-07	4 (8 starts)									0
(Canada) Daniel Morad	2008-09	7 (14 starts)									8
(United States) Graham Rahal	2005-06	4 (8 starts)									0
(Lebanon) Basil Shaaban	2005-06, 2006-07	8 (16 starts)									0

Drivers with a flag have raced for Lebanon, despite not being Lebanese.

== Complete A1 Grand Prix results ==
(key), "spr" indicates the Sprint Race, "fea" indicates the Feature Race.

Year	Racing team	Chassis, Engine, Tyres	Drivers	1	2	3	4	5	6	7	8	9	10	11	12	13	14	15	16	17	18	19	20	21	22	Points	Rank
2005-06	Carlin Motorsport	Lola, Zytek, Cooper Avon		(United Kingdom) GBR		(Germany) GER		(Portugal) POR		(Australia) AUS		(Malaysia) MYS		(United Arab Emirates) UAE		(South Africa) RSA		(Indonesia) INA		(Mexico) MEX		(United States) USA		(China) CHN		0	23rd
2005-06	Carlin Motorsport	Lola, Zytek, Cooper Avon		spr	fea	spr	fea	spr	fea	spr	fea	spr	fea	spr	fea	spr	fea	spr	fea	spr	fea	spr	fea	spr	fea	0	23rd
2005-06	Carlin Motorsport	Lola, Zytek, Cooper Avon	Khalil Beschir	22	Ret	Ret	18					Ret	17													0	23rd
2005-06	Carlin Motorsport	Lola, Zytek, Cooper Avon	Basil Shaaban					18	11	Ret	12			Ret	16	17	Ret	17	Ret							0	23rd
2005-06	Carlin Motorsport	Lola, Zytek, Cooper Avon	Graham Rahal																	13	14	Ret	Ret	18	11	0	23rd
2006-07	Carlin Motorsport	Lola; Zytek; Cooper Avon		(Netherlands) NED		(Czech Republic) CZE		(China) BEI		(Malaysia) MYS		(Indonesia) INA		(New Zealand) NZL		(Australia) AUS		(South Africa) RSA		(Mexico) MEX		(China) SHA		(United Kingdom) GBR		0	23rd
2006-07	Carlin Motorsport	Lola; Zytek; Cooper Avon		spr	fea	spr	fea	spr	fea	spr	fea	spr	fea	spr	fea	spr	fea	spr	fea	spr	fea	spr	fea	spr	fea	0	23rd
2006-07	Carlin Motorsport	Lola; Zytek; Cooper Avon	Basil Shaaban	16	Ret			19	13			19	Ret													0	23rd
2006-07	Carlin Motorsport	Lola; Zytek; Cooper Avon	Graham Rahal			12	12																			0	23rd
2006-07	Carlin Motorsport	Lola; Zytek; Cooper Avon	Khalil Beschir							17	20															0	23rd
2006-07	Carlin Motorsport	Lola; Zytek; Cooper Avon	Alexander Khateeb											Ret	17	Ret	17									0	23rd
2006-07	Carlin Motorsport	Lola; Zytek; Cooper Avon	Allam Khodair															19	Ret	18	19	18	14	Ret	13	0	23rd
2007-08	Argo Racing Cars Ltd.	Lola; Zytek; Cooper Avon		(Netherlands) NED		(Czech Republic) CZE		(Malaysia) MYS		(China) ZHU		(New Zealand) NZL		(Australia) AUS		(South Africa) RSA		(Mexico) MEX		(China) SHA		(United Kingdom) GBR				0	22nd
2007-08	Argo Racing Cars Ltd.	Lola; Zytek; Cooper Avon		spr	fea	spr	fea	spr	fea	spr	fea	spr	fea	spr	fea	spr	fea	spr	fea	spr	fea	spr	fea			0	22nd
2007-08	Argo Racing Cars Ltd.	Lola; Zytek; Cooper Avon	Chris Alajajian	14	19			14	Ret	Ret	13	15	Ret	19	19											0	22nd
2007-08	Argo Racing Cars Ltd.	Lola; Zytek; Cooper Avon	Khalil Beschir			20	21									19	13					22	18			0	22nd
2007-08	Argo Racing Cars Ltd.	Lola; Zytek; Cooper Avon	Jimmy Auby															15	17	18	22					0	22nd
2008-09	Argo Racing Cars Ltd.	Ferrari, Ferrari, Michelin		(Netherlands) NED		(China) CHN		(Malaysia) MYS		(New Zealand) NZL		(South Africa) RSA		(Portugal) POR		(United Kingdom) GBR										8	17th
2008-09	Argo Racing Cars Ltd.	Ferrari, Ferrari, Michelin		spr	fea	spr	fea	spr	fea	spr	fea	spr	fea	spr	fea	spr	fea									8	17th
2008-09	Argo Racing Cars Ltd.	Ferrari, Ferrari, Michelin	Daniel Morad	10	8	12	13	11	12	Ret	Ret	NC	6	Ret	Ret	Ret	12									8	17th
