= A1 Team South Africa =

- South Africa
- Founded: 2005
- Seat holder(s): Tokyo Sexwale
- Team principal: -
- Race driver(s): Adrian Zaugg, Alan van der Merwe
- Car nickname: Vulindlela
- First race: 2005-06 Great Britain
- Rounds entered: 33
- Championships: 0
- Sprint race victories: 2
- Feature race victories: 1
- Pole positions: 5
- Fastest laps: 3
- Total points: 143
- 2008-09 position: 9th (3 pts)

A1 Team South Africa was the South African team of A1 Grand Prix, an international racing series.

== Management ==
A1 Team South Africa's owner was Tokyo Sexwale. The Chief Executive Officer of the team was Dana Cooper and the technical and sporting manager was Mike Carroll. For the 2006–07 season South Africa have enlisted DAMS to run their car, the outfit which ran the French and Swiss teams to 1st and 2nd places in 2005–06.

== History ==
=== 2005–06 season ===
Drivers: Tomas Scheckter, Stephen Simpson

In the inaugural season, Team South Africa scored a podium en route to 17th place in the championship.

=== 2006–07 season ===
Drivers: Stephen Simpson, Alan van der Merwe, Adrian Zaugg

Team South Africa had mixed fortunes in 2006–07. A victory, a podium and two high-placing results were offset by other bad results and the team finished in 14th position.

=== 2007–08 season ===
Driver: Adrian Zaugg

Consistent scoring, two victories and two podiums brought Team South Africa to 5th place in the championship.

=== 2008–09 season ===
Drivers: Adrian Zaugg, Alan van der Merwe

== Drivers ==
Name	Seasons	Races (Starts)	A1GP Title	Wins	Sprint wins	Main wins	2nd	3rd	Poles	Fastest Laps	Points
Tomas Scheckter	2005-06	2 (4)									1
Stephen Simpson	2005-06, 2006-07	10 (20)						1	0		19
Alan van der Merwe	2006-07, 2008-09	8 (10)									0
Adrian Zaugg	2006-07, 2007-08, 2008-09	17 (34)		3	2	1	1	2	5	3	123

== Complete A1 Grand Prix results ==
(key), "spr" indicate a Sprint Race, "fea" indicate a Main Race.

Year	Racing team	Chassis, Engine, Tyres	Drivers	1	2	3	4	5	6	7	8	9	10	11	12	13	14	15	16	17	18	19	20	21	22	Points	Rank
2005-06	BCN Competicion	Lola, Zytek, Cooper Avon		GBR spr	GBR fea	GER spr	GER fea	POR spr	POR fea	AUS spr	AUS fea	MAS spr	MAS fea	UAE spr	UAE fea	RSA spr	RSA fea	IDN spr	IDN fea	MEX spr	MEX fea	USA spr	USA fea	CHN spr	CHN fea	20	17th
2005-06	BCN Competicion	Lola, Zytek, Cooper Avon	Stephen Simpson	24	6					Ret	Ret	Ret	12	12	3	Ret	5	Ret	11	Ret	18	11	Ret	11	14	20	17th
2005-06	BCN Competicion	Lola, Zytek, Cooper Avon	Tomas Scheckter			12	Ret	10	Ret																	20	17th
2006-07	DAMS	Lola; Zytek; Cooper Avon		NED spr	NED fea	CZE spr	CZE fea	BEI spr	BEI fea	MAS spr	MAS fea	IDN spr	IDN fea	NZL spr	NZL fea	AUS spr	AUS fea	RSA spr	RSA fea	MEX spr	MEX fea	SHA spr	SHA fea	GBR spr	GBR fea	24	14th
2006-07	DAMS	Lola; Zytek; Cooper Avon	Adrian Zaugg	1	Ret			Ret	5	13	12							7	Ret	4	3			15	Ret	24	14th
2006-07	DAMS	Lola; Zytek; Cooper Avon	Stephen Simpson			Ret	11																			24	14th
2006-07	DAMS	Lola; Zytek; Cooper Avon	Alan van der Merwe									9	Ret	7	6	16	Ret					8	12			24	14th
2007-08	DAMS	Lola; Zytek; Cooper Avon		NED spr	NED fea	CZE spr	CZE fea	MAS spr	MAS fea	ZHU spr	ZHU fea	NZL spr	NZL fea	AUS spr	AUS fea	RSA spr	RSA fea	MEX spr	MEX fea	SHA spr	SHA fea	GBR spr	GBR fea			96	5th
2007-08	DAMS	Lola; Zytek; Cooper Avon	Adrian Zaugg	1	2	4	16	10	Ret	Ret	3	4	7	7	1	13	7	Ret	6	7	16	7	11			96	5th
2008-09	DAMS	Ferrari, Ferrari, Michelin		(Netherlands) NED		(China) CHN		(Malaysia) MAS		(New Zealand) NZL		(South Africa) RSA		(Portugal) POR		(United Kingdom) GBR										19	14th
2008-09	DAMS	Ferrari, Ferrari, Michelin		spr	fea	spr	fea	spr	fea	spr	fea	spr	fea	spr	fea	spr	fea									19	14th
2008-09	DAMS	Ferrari, Ferrari, Michelin	Adrian Zaugg	6	Ret	5	9	9	5	10	9	7	Ret	17	Ret											19	14th
2008-09	DAMS	Ferrari, Ferrari, Michelin	Alan van der Merwe													15	11									19	14th
