= A1 Team China =

- China
- Founded: 2005
- Seat holder(s): Liu Yu
- Team principal: Werner Gillis
- Race driver(s): Cheng Congfu; Ho-Pin Tung
- Car nickname: n/a
- First race: 2005-06 Great Britain
- Rounds entered: 39 (78 races)
- Championships: 0
- Sprint race victories: 0
- Feature race victories: 0
- Pole positions: 0
- Fastest laps: 4
- Total points: 87
- 2008-09 position: 17th (4 pts)

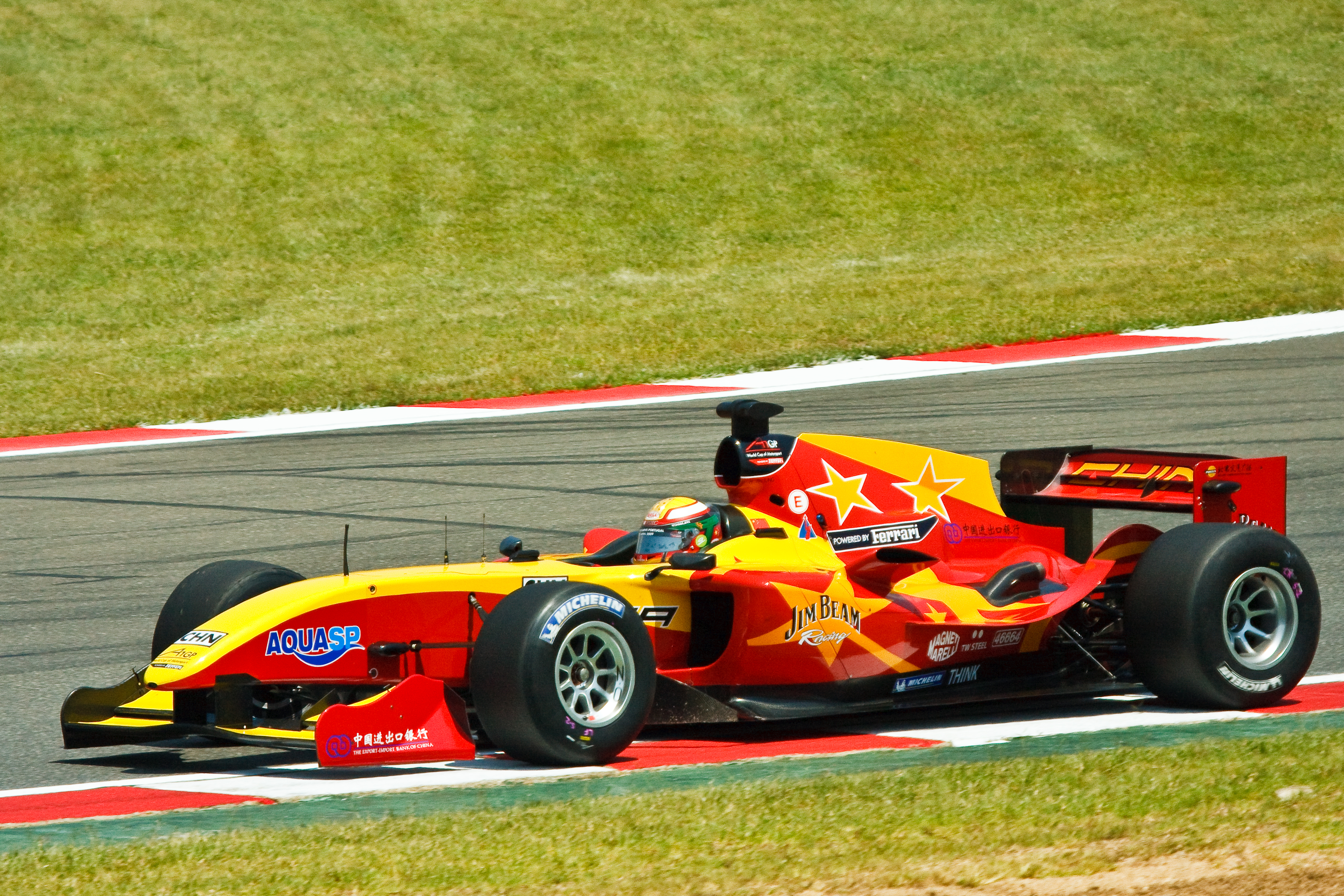
A1 Team China

A1 Team China was the Chinese team of A1 Grand Prix, a now defunct international racing series.

== Management ==
The seat holder A1 Team China is Liu Yu (刘煜). Werner Gillis is the team principal, and technical support is provided by Team Astromega.

== History ==
=== 2008–09 season ===
Drivers: Cheng Congfu, Ho-Pin Tung

=== 2007–08 season ===
Driver: Cheng Congfu

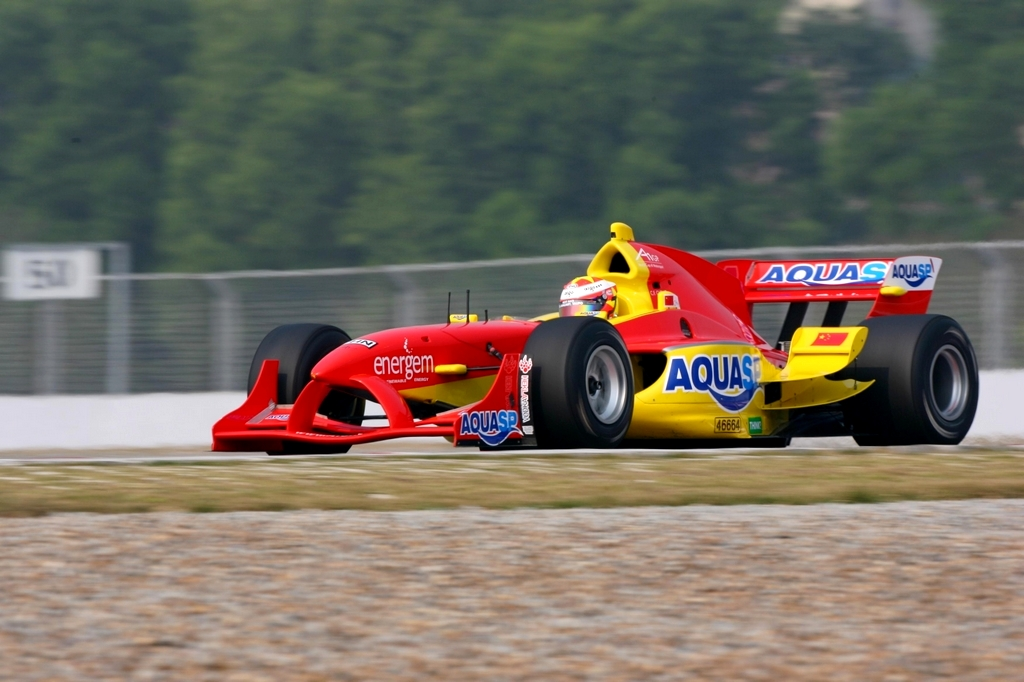
Cheng Congfu taking A1 Team China to a podium finish at Zhuhai International Circuit.

A mixed bag of results for the team, culminated in 13th position, including a podium at one of the team's home races in Zhuhai.

=== 2006–07 season ===
Drivers: Cheng Congfu, Ho-Pin Tung

Fortunes changed for Team China, as the mix of Cheng and Tung managed to lift the team to 15th position, as well as scoring a podium.

=== 2005–06 season ===
Drivers: Tengyi Jiang, Qinghua Ma

Team China were uncompetitive in the inaugural season, scoring points only once and finishing in 22nd position.

== Drivers ==
| Name | Seasons | Races (Starts) | A1GP Title | Wins | Sprint wins | Main wins | 2nd | 3rd | Poles | Fastest Laps | Points |
|---|---|---|---|---|---|---|---|---|---|---|---|
| Cheng Congfu | 2006-07, 2007-08, 2008-09 | 18 (36) | | | | | | 1 | | 4 | 64 |
| Tengyi Jiang | 2005-06 | 10 (20) | | | | | | | | | 6 |
| Qinghua Ma | 2005-06 | 1 (2) | | | | | | | | | 0 |
| Ho-Pin Tung | 2006-07, 2008-09 | 10 (20) | | | | | | 1 | | | 17 |

== Complete A1 Grand Prix results ==
(key), "spr" indicate a Sprint Race, "fea" indicate a Main Race.

| Year | Racing team | Chassis, Engine, Tyres | Drivers | 1 | 2 | 3 | 4 | 5 | 6 | 7 | 8 | 9 | 10 | 11 | 12 | 13 | 14 | 15 | 16 | 17 | 18 | 19 | 20 | 21 | 22 | Points | Rank |
|---|---|---|---|---|---|---|---|---|---|---|---|---|---|---|---|---|---|---|---|---|---|---|---|---|---|---|---|
| 2005-06 | Team Astromega | Lola, Zytek, Cooper Avon | | GBR spr | GBR fea | GER spr | GER fea | PRT spr | PRT fea | AUS spr | AUS fea | MYS spr | MYS fea | ARE spr | ARE fea | ZAF spr | ZAF fea | IDN spr | IDN fea | MEX spr | MEX fea | USA spr | USA fea | CHN spr | CHN fea | 6 | 22nd |
| 2005-06 | Team Astromega | Lola, Zytek, Cooper Avon | Tengyi Jiang | 21 | 12 | 18 | 17 | Ret | 14 | 16 | Ret | 20 | Ret | 19 | 5 | Ret | Ret | Ret | Ret | 15 | 17 | 17 | Ret | | | 6 | 22nd |
| 2005-06 | Team Astromega | Lola, Zytek, Cooper Avon | Qinghua Ma | | | | | | | | | | | | | | | | | | | | | 14 | 16 | 6 | 22nd |
| 2006-07 | Team Astromega | Lola; Zytek; Cooper Avon | | NED spr | NED fea | CZE spr | CZE fea | BEI spr | BEI fea | MYS spr | MYS fea | IDN spr | IDN fea | NZ spr | NZ fea | AUS spr | AUS fea | ZAF spr | ZAF fea | MEX spr | MEX fea | SHA spr | SHA fea | GBR spr | GBR fea | 22 | 15th |
| 2006-07 | Team Astromega | Lola; Zytek; Cooper Avon | Cheng Congfu | 11 | 9 | 4 | 8 | 13 | Ret | 10 | 16 | | | | | | | | | | | 11 | 15 | Ret | 10 | 22 | 15th |
| 2006-07 | Team Astromega | Lola; Zytek; Cooper Avon | Ho-Pin Tung | | | | | | | | | Ret | 13 | 13 | 9 | 6 | 3 | 14 | Ret | 6 | 10 | | | | | 22 | 15th |
| 2007-08 | Team Astromega | Lola; Zytek; Cooper Avon | | NED spr | NED fea | CZE spr | CZE fea | MYS spr | MYS fea | ZHU spr | ZHU fea | NZ spr | NZ fea | AUS spr | AUS fea | ZAF spr | ZAF fea | MEX spr | MEX fea | SHA spr | SHA fea | GBR spr | GBR fea | | | 55 | 13th |
| 2007-08 | Team Astromega | Lola; Zytek; Cooper Avon | Cheng Congfu | 17 | 15 | 10 | 4 | Ret | 5 | 3 | 9 | 14 | Ret | 14 | 10 | 4 | 6 | 17 | 10 | 10 | 15 | 21 | 4 | | | 55 | 13th |
| 2008-09 | Team Astromega | Ferrari, Ferrari, Michelin | | (Netherlands) NLD | | (China) CHN | | (Malaysia) MYS | | (New Zealand) NZL | | (South Africa) RSA | | (Portugal) POR | | (United Kingdom) GBR | | | | | | | | | | 4 | 17th |
| 2008-09 | Team Astromega | Ferrari, Ferrari, Michelin | | spr | fea | spr | fea | spr | fea | spr | fea | spr | fea | spr | fea | spr | fea | | | | | | | | | 4 | 17th |
| 2008-09 | Team Astromega | Ferrari, Ferrari, Michelin | Ho-Pin Tung | 13 | 9 | 17 | 12 | 10 | 9 | | | 13 | Ret | 16 | 8 | | | | | | | | | | | 4 | 17th |
| 2008-09 | Team Astromega | Ferrari, Ferrari, Michelin | Cheng Congfu | | | | | | | Ret | 14 | | | | | 14 | Ret | | | | | | | | | 4 | 17th |
