= List of A1 Grand Prix teams =

The following is a list of teams which competed in the A1 Grand Prix series. 29 teams participated in at least one A1 Grand Prix race.

== A1 team list and statistics ==
Team	Seasons	Drivers	Race weekends (starts)	Total	Sprint	Feature	2nd place	3rd place	Pole positions	Fastest laps	Points finishes	Champions	Second	Third	Total Points (Note: Point scoring systems varied between seasons; direct comparisons may not be applicable. Points dropped in the 2008–09 season are included.)
Team	Seasons	Drivers	Race weekends (starts)	Race wins			2nd place	3rd place	Pole positions	Fastest laps	Points finishes	Championship positions			Total Points
Australia	4	8	39 (78)				1	5		1	29				132
Austria	1	2	11 (22)								6				14
Brazil	4	9	39 (75)	2	1	1	2	3	2	4	27				142
Canada	3	4	32 (64)	2	1	1	3	3	2	2	29				167
China	4	4	39 (78)					2		4	24				90
Czech Republic	3	7	32 (64)	1		1	1	2			19				93
France	4	7	39 (78)	15	8	7	10	8	6	11	57	1			404
Germany	4	7	35 (70)	11	4	7	5	2	4	6	41	1			251
(United Kingdom) Great Britain	4	5	38 (76)	5	3	2	17	6	5	4	48			3	343
Greece	1	2	2 (4)								0				0
India	4	4	35 (69)	2		2	1		1		19				93
Indonesia	4	4	38 (76)								8				21
(Republic of Ireland) Ireland	4	4	39 (78)	6	3	3	3	4	6	9	40	1			282
Italy	4	7	39 (78)	1		1	1	4	1	1	30				127
Japan	1	3	7 (13)								4				8
(South Korea) Korea	1	1	3 (4)								1				4
Lebanon	4	8	39 (78)								2				8
Malaysia	4	3	39 (78)	5	4	1	3	1	3	4	40				193
Mexico	4	8	38 (76)	2	1	1	3	5	1	5	23				135
Monaco	1	1	7 (14)					1	1		6				35
Netherlands	4	4	39 (77)	4	3	1	4	2	5	3	53				294
New Zealand	4	4	39 (78)	7	4	3	6	8	4	6	56		2		333
Pakistan	3	3	29 (58)								4				12
Portugal	4	4	33 (64)	1		1	4	6		2	37			1	227
Russia	1	3	3 (6)								0				0
Singapore	1	2	7 (14)								1				3
South Africa	4	4	39 (78)	3	2	1	1	3	5	4	27				159
Switzerland	4	4	39 (78)	10	5	5	9	11	10	9	57	1	2		438
(United States) USA	4	8	39 (78)	1		1	3	2		3	34				145
