= Ian Dyk =

Australian race driver

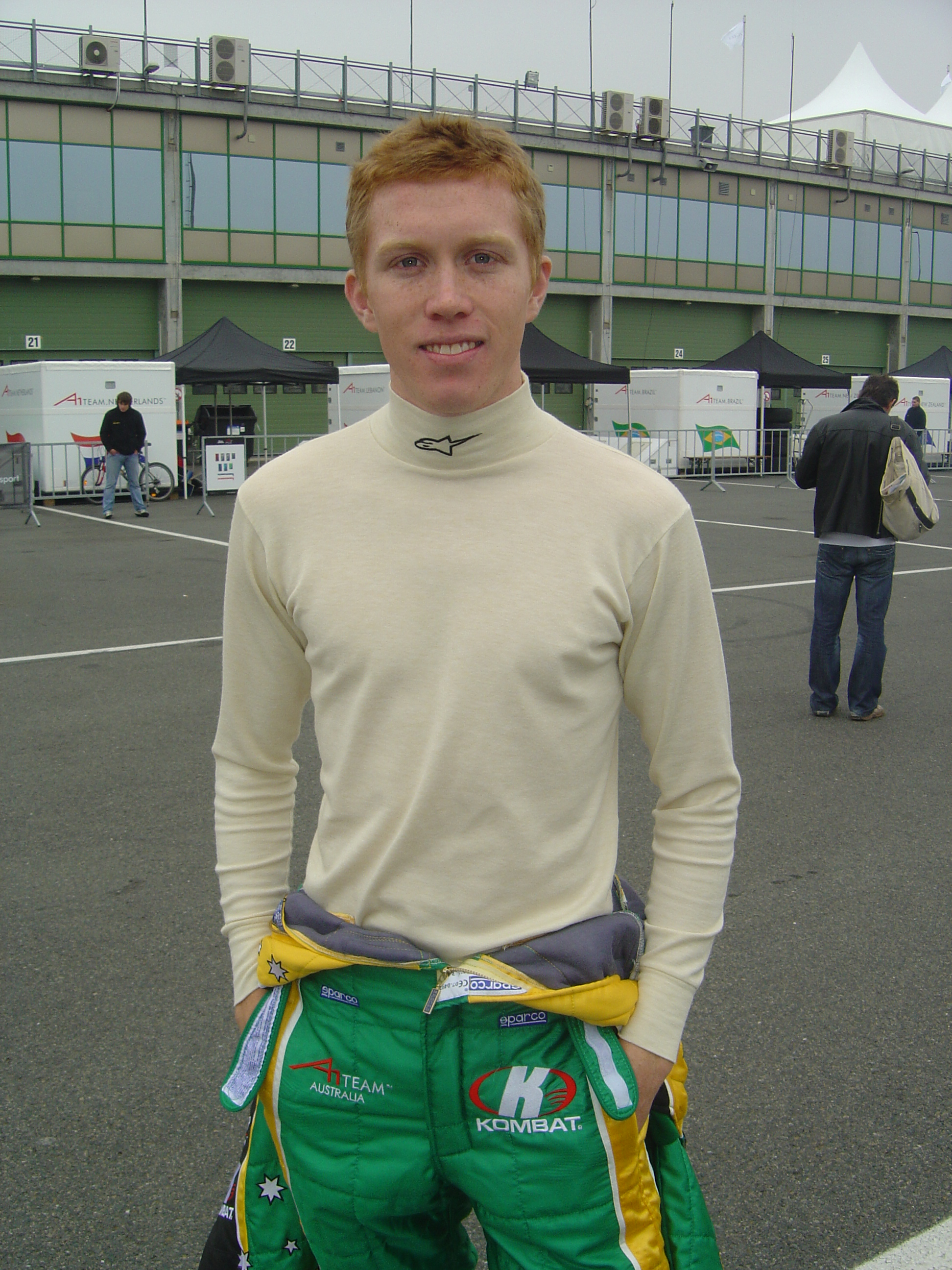
- Dyk in 2007.
- Nationality: Australian
- Born: 15 September 1985 (age 41) Mount Isa, Queensland

A1 Grand Prix
- Years active: 2006-08
- Teams: A1 Team Australia
- Starts: 14
- Best finish: 13th in 2006–07 A1 Grand Prix season

Previous series
- 2002 2002-03 2003-04,07 2005-06: Formula Ford NSW; Australian Formula Ford; Australian Formula 3 Carrera Cup Australia

Ian Dyk (born 15 September 1985), is an Australian race driver. Starting in Motocross in 1991, he moved into karting in 1996 and has progressed to Formula Ford, Australian Formula 3, Carrera Cup Australia and A1 Grand Prix.

Dyk is now a driver instructor and also a member if the Toyota Hilux Hero's stunt team.

== Career results ==
| Season | Series | Position | Car | Team |
|---|---|---|---|---|
| 2000 | Australian Junior National Light Kart Championship | **1st** | | |
| 2002 | New South Wales Formula Ford Championship | 4th | Swift FB89 - Ford | |
| 2002 | Australian Formula Ford Championship | 19th | Van Diemen RF98 - Ford | |
| 2003 | Australian Formula Ford Championship | 7th | Van Diemen RF98 - Ford | |
| 2003 | Australian Formula 3 Championship | 13th | Dallara F301 - Spiess Opel | Bronte Rundle Motorsport |
| 2004 | Australian Formula 3 Championship | **3rd** | Dallara F301 - Spiess Opel | Astuti Racing |
| 2005 | Australian Drivers' Championship | 13th | Dallara F304 - Spiess Opel | Bronte Rundle Motorsport |
| 2005 | Australian Carrera Cup Championship | 8th | Porsche 996 GT3 Cup | Greg Murphy Racing |
| 2006 | Australian Carrera Cup Championship | 11th | Porsche 997 GT3 Cup | Paul Cruickshank Racing |
| 2006-07 | A1 Grand Prix | 13th | Lola B05/52 - Zytek | A1 Team Australia |
| 2007 | Australian Formula 3 Trophy Class | 8th | Dallara F301 - Spiess Opel | Scud Racing |
| 2007-08 | A1 Grand Prix | 17th | Lola B05/52 - Zytek | A1 Team Australia |

=== Complete A1 Grand Prix results ===
(key) (Races in bold indicate pole position) (Races in italics indicate fastest lap)

| Year | Entrant | 1 | 2 | 3 | 4 | 5 | 6 | 7 | 8 | 9 | 10 | 11 | 12 | 13 | 14 | 15 | 16 | 17 | 18 | 19 | 20 | 21 | 22 | DC | Points |
|---|---|---|---|---|---|---|---|---|---|---|---|---|---|---|---|---|---|---|---|---|---|---|---|---|---|
| 2006–07 | Australia | NED; SPR | NED; FEA | CZE; SPR; PO | CZE; FEA; PO | CHN; SPR; PO | CHN; FEA; PO | MYS; SPR | MYS; FEA | IDN; SPR | IDN; FEA | NZL; SPR; PO | NZL; FEA; PO | AUS; SPR; PO | AUS; FEA; PO | RSA; SPR; PO | RSA; FEA; PO | MEX; SPR; 3 | MEX; FEA; 8 | CHN; SPR; 16 | CHN; FEA; Ret | GBR; SPR; 14 | GBR; SPR; Ret | 13th | 25 |
| 2007–08 | Australia | NED; SPR; 21 | NED; FEA; 12 | CZE; SPR; Ret | CZE; FEA; 13 | MYS; SPR; Ret | MYS; FEA; 9 | CHN; SPR; 13 | CHN; FEA; 15 | NZL; SPR | NZL; FEA | AUS; SPR | AUS; FEA | RSA; SPR | RSA; FEA | MEX; SPR | MEX; FEA | CHN; SPR | CHN; FEA | GBR; SPR | GBR; FEA | | | 17th | 20 |
