= List of A1 Grand Prix seasons =

This is a List of A1 Grand Prix seasons, that is a list of the A1 Grand Prix championship seasons since the inaugural 2005–06 season. This list is accurate up to and including the 2008–09 season.

== Summary ==
Season	Chassis	Engine	Tyres	Rounds	Teams	Drivers	Champion (points)	Second (points)	Third (points)
2005–06	Lola	Zytek	Cooper Avon	11	25	58	France (172)	Switzerland (121)	(United Kingdom) Great Britain (97)
2006–07	Lola	Zytek	Cooper Avon	11	24	61	Germany (128)	New Zealand (93)	(United Kingdom) Great Britain (92)
2007–08	Lola	Zytek	Cooper Avon	10	22	46	Switzerland (168)	New Zealand (127)	(United Kingdom) Great Britain (126)
2008–09	A1GP	Ferrari	Michelin	7	21	35	(Republic of Ireland) Ireland (112)	Switzerland (95*)	Portugal (92)
2009–10	season cancelled								

* Switzerland scored 99 points in total, but due to the lack of cars available at the opening round at Zandvoort, only the best six rounds counted towards the championship.

== Champions ==
The champion's trophy is awarded to the most successful A1 Grand Prix team over a season, as determined by a pointscoring system based on results. The teams' championship was first awarded in 2005–06, to A1 Team France.

Season	Team	Racing team	Chassis	Engine	Tyres	Drivers	Wins	Sprints wins	Main wins	2nd	3rd	Poles	Fastest Laps	Points
2005–06	France	DAMS	Lola	Zytek	Cooper Avon	Alexandre Prémat; Nicolas Lapierre	13	7	6	2	0	4	5	172
2006–07	Germany	Super Nova Racing	Lola	Zytek	Cooper Avon	Nico Hülkenberg; Christian Vietoris	9	3	6	3	2	3	3	128
2007–08	Switzerland	Max Motorsport Consulting	Lola	Zytek	Cooper Avon	Neel Jani	4	2	2	2	5	5	5	168
2008–09	(Republic of Ireland) Ireland	Status Grand Prix	A1GP	Ferrari	Michelin	Adam Carroll	5	3	2	3	0	6	5	112
2009–10	season cancelled													
