= 2006 Durban A1GP round =

2005–06 A1GP of South Africa

Race Details
- Race 7 of 11 in the 2005–06 A1 Grand Prix season
- Date: 29 January 2006
- Location: Durban street circuit Durban, South Africa
- Weather: Fine, 25 °C

Qualifying
- Pole: France (Alexandre Premat)
- Time: 2'36.841 (1'18.246, 1'18.595)

Sprint Race
- 1st: France (Alexandre Premat)
- 2nd: Great Britain (Robbie Kerr)
- 3rd: Switzerland (Neel Jani)

Main Race
- 1st: The Netherlands (Jos Verstappen)
- 2nd: Switzerland (Neel Jani)
- 3rd: Portugal (Alvaro Parente)

Fast Lap
- FL: Brazil (Nelson Piquet Jr.)
- Time: 1'18.178, (Lap 39 of Main Race)

Official Classifications
- Prac1 ·Prac2 ·Prac3 ·Qual ·SRace ·MRace

Layout of the Durban street circuit

The 2005–06 A1 Grand Prix of Nations, South Africa was an A1 Grand Prix race, held on the weekend of 29 January 2006 at a street course in Durban, South Africa. This was the only street course of the 2005–06 A1 Grand Prix season.

== Report ==
=== Practice ===
The first practice session was wet, and the second was wetter. Both were interrupted by several red flags. Ananda Mikola driving for A1 Team Indonesia was fastest in the first session with a time of 1:28.477. Will Davison from A1 Team Australia was fastest in the second session with a time of 1:30.520.

During the third practice, on Saturday, A1 Team Pakistan driver Adam Khan was involved in a serious crash, forcing a helicopter flight to the nearest hospital for precautionary CT scans. These scans showed negative, but Khan was unable to compete in the remainder of the weekend's events, replaced by A1 Team Italy's backup driver, Enrico Toccacelo but Pakistan would not score points.

== Results ==
=== Qualification ===
Qualification took place on Saturday, 28 January 2006.

Pos	Team	Driver	Q1 Time	Q2 Time	Q3 Time	Q4 Time	Aggregate	Gap
1	France	Alexandre Premat	1'20.484	1'18.246	1'18.595	--	2'36.841	--
2	(United Kingdom) Great Britain	Robbie Kerr	1'20.647	1'19.158	1'18.921	--	2'38.079	1.238
3	Switzerland	Neel Jani	1'20.387	1'19.056	1'19.778	1'19.037	2'38.093	1.252
4	The Netherlands	Jos Verstappen	1'20.208	1'19.628	1'19.198	1'19.254	2'38.452	1.611
5	(Republic of Ireland) Ireland	Ralph Firman	1'20.342	1'19.258	1'19.251	1'20.340	2'38.509	1.668
6	Czech Republic	Tomáš Enge	1'19.591	--	1'19.285	1'19.256	2'38.541	1.700
7	New Zealand	Matt Halliday	1'19.842	1'20.018	1'19.331	1'19.525	2'38.856	2.015
8	Brazil	Nelson Piquet Jr.	1'20.907	1'19.630	1'20.172	1'19.246	2'38.876	2.035
9	Canada	Sean McIntosh	1'21.905	1'19.349	1'19.647	--	2'38.996	2.155
10	Malaysia	Alex Yoong	1'20.498	1'19.652	1'19.875	1'19.545	2'39.197	2.356
11	Indonesia	Ananda Mikola	1'45.053	1'19.989	1'20.653	1'19.251	2'39.240	2.399
12	Germany	Timo Scheider	1'21.730	1'19.773	1'19.880	1'19.552	2'39.325	2.484
13	(United States) USA	Philip Giebler	1'20.867	1'19.762	1'19.593	--	2'39.355	2.514
14	Italy	Massimiliano Busnelli	1'20.503	1'19.640	--	1'19.779	2'39.419	2.578
15	Portugal	Alvaro Parente	1'20.198	1'19.924	1'19.953	1'19.747	2'39.671	2.830
16	South Africa	Stephen Simpson	1'21.557	1'20.570	1'20.737	1'19.623	2'40.193	3.352
17	Australia	Will Davison	1'22.481	1'20.969	1'20.566	1'20.086	2'40.652	3.811
18	Lebanon	Basil Shaaban	1'22.614	1'20.837	1'21.008	--	2'41.845	5.004
19	Mexico	David Martínez	1'22.600	1'20.810	1'21.076	1'21.036	2'41.846	5.005
20	China	Tengyi Jiang	1'22.976	1'21.286	1'21.538	1'23.357	2'42.824	5.983
21	Austria	Mathias Lauda	1'22.326	1'21.463	1'21.408	--	2'42.871	6.030
22	India	Armaan Ebrahim	1'25.020	1'23.393	1'23.487	--	2'46.880	10.039
23	Pakistan	Adam Khan *	--	--	--	--	--	--

=== Sprint Race results ===
The Sprint Race took place on Sunday, 29 January 2006.

Pos	Team	Driver	Laps	Time	Points
1	France	Alexandre Premat	20	31:06.730	10
2	(United Kingdom) Great Britain	Robbie Kerr	20	+0.243	9
3	Switzerland	Neel Jani	20	+5.850	8
4	(Republic of Ireland) Ireland	Ralph Firman	20	+6.160	7
5	Czech Republic	Tomáš Enge	20	+8.506	6
6	New Zealand	Matt Halliday	20	+9.623	5
7	Germany	Timo Scheider	20	+10.112	4
8	Portugal	Alvaro Parente	20	+14.066	3
9	Australia	Will Davison	20	+22.099	2
10	Mexico	David Martínez	20	+32.780	1
11	Pakistan	Enrico Toccacelo	20	+36.575	
12	Canada	Sean McIntosh	20	+39.260	
13	(United States) USA	Philip Giebler	20	+42.131	
14	India	Armaan Ebrahim	20	+1'25.715	
15	Austria	Mathias Lauda	20	+1'27.136	
16	The Netherlands	Jos Verstappen	19	+1 Lap	
17	Lebanon	Basil Shaaban	18	+2 Laps	
18	China	Tengyi Jiang	17	+3 Laps	
19	Brazil	Nelson Piquet Jr.	16	+4 Laps	
20	South Africa	Stephen Simpson	13	+7 Laps	
21	Indonesia	Ananda Mikola	0	+20 Laps	
22	Italy	Massimiliano Busnelli	0	+20 Laps	
23	Malaysia	Alex Yoong	0	+20 Laps	

=== Main Race results ===
The Main Race took place on Sunday, 29 January 2006.

Pos	Team	Driver	Laps	Time	Points
1	The Netherlands	Jos Verstappen	40	1'00:46.099	10
2	Switzerland	Neel Jani	40	+1.774	9
3	Portugal	Alvaro Parente	40	+1.965	8
4	New Zealand	Matt Halliday	40	+4.352	7
5	South Africa	Stephen Simpson	40	+9.433	6
6	Italy	Massimiliano Busnelli	40	+10.735	5
7	Austria	Mathias Lauda	40	+30.123	4
8	France	Alexandre Premat	40	+37.217 *	3
9	Brazil	Nelson Piquet Jr.	40	+1'03.631	2
10	Canada	Sean McIntosh	36	+4 Laps	1
11	Germany	Timo Scheider	35	+5 Laps	
12	China	Tengyi Jiang	35	+5 Laps	
13	Pakistan	Enrico Toccacelo	31	+9 Laps	
14	Mexico	David Martínez	30	+10 Laps	
15	Lebanon	Basil Shaaban	27	+13 Laps	
16	Malaysia	Alex Yoong	25	+15 Laps	
17	(Republic of Ireland) Ireland	Ralph Firman	14	+26 Laps	
18	India	Armaan Ebrahim	10	+30 Laps	
19	Indonesia	Ananda Mikola	10	+30 Laps	
20	(United Kingdom) Great Britain	Robbie Kerr	9	+31 Laps	
21	Czech Republic	Tomáš Enge	7	+33 Laps	
22	Australia	Will Davison	2	+38 Laps	
23	(United States) USA	Philip Giebler	2	+38 Laps	

* Team France 25 seconds penalty by steward's decision.

=== Total Points ===
Team	Points	SR	MR	FL
Switzerland	17	8	9	--
France	13	10	3	--
New Zealand	12	5	7	--
Portugal	11	3	8	--
The Netherlands	10	--	10	--
(United Kingdom) Great Britain	9	9	--	--
(Republic of Ireland) Ireland	7	7	--	--
Czech Republic	6	6	--	--
South Africa	6	--	6	--
Italy	5	--	5	--
Austria	4	--	4	--
Germany	4	4	--	--
Brazil	3	--	2	1
Australia	2	2	--	--
Canada	1	--	1	--
Mexico	1	1	--	--

- Fastest Lap: A1 Team Brazil (1'18.178 / 151.2 km/h, lap 39 of Main Race)
