= 2006 Monterrey A1GP round =

2005-06 A1GP of Mexico

Race Details
- Race 9 of 11 in the 2005-06 A1 Grand Prix season
- Date: February 26, 2006
- Location: Fundidora Park; Monterrey, Mexico
- Weather: Fine

Qualifying
- Pole: South Africa (Stephen Simpson)
- Time: 2'44.895 (1'22.078, 1'22.817)

Sprint Race
- 1st: France (Alexandre Premat)
- 2nd: Switzerland (Neel Jani)
- 3rd: Italy (Enrico Toccacelo)

Main Race
- 1st: France (Alexandre Premat)
- 2nd: The Netherlands (Jos Verstappen)
- 3rd: Switzerland (Neel Jani)

Fast Lap
- FL: France (Alexandre Premat)
- Time: 1'21.100, (Lap 17 of Main Race)

Official Classifications

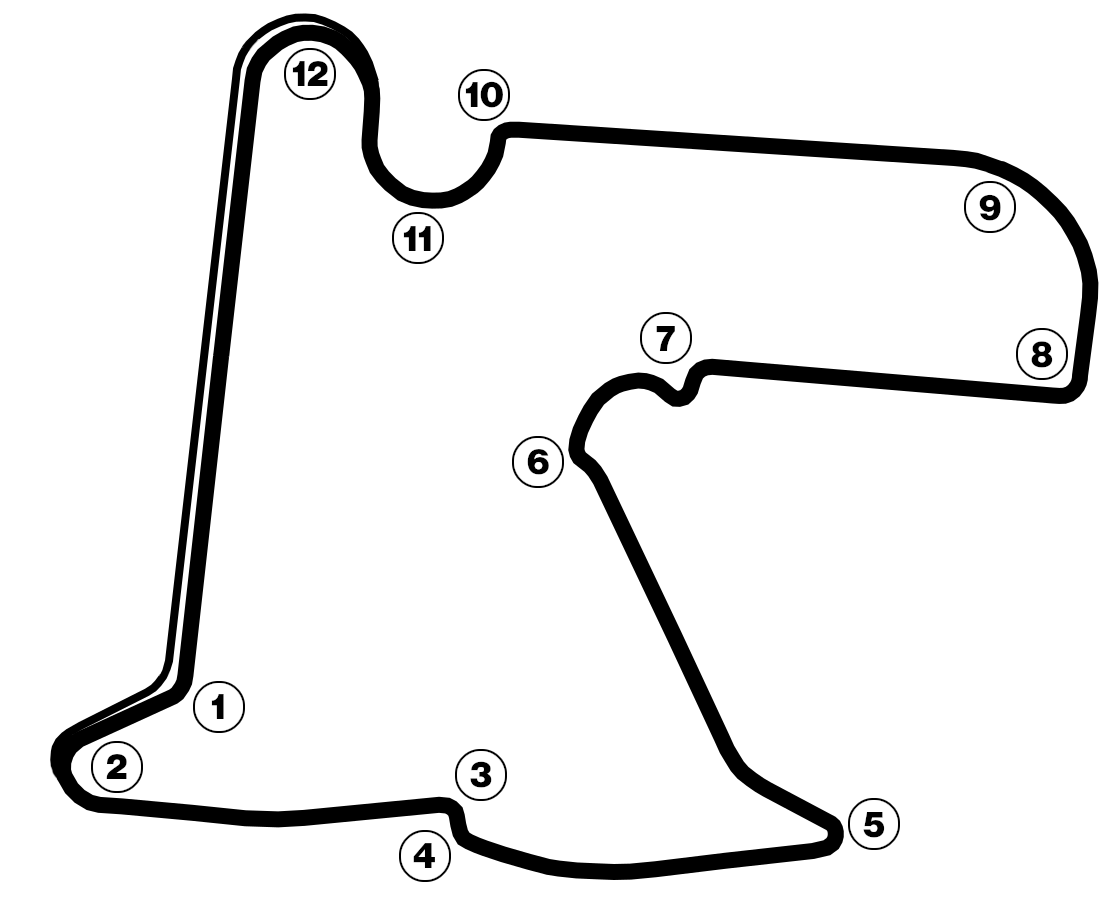
Layout of the Fundidora Park Raceway

The 2005–06 A1 Grand Prix of Nations, Mexico was an A1 Grand Prix race, held on the weekend of February 26, 2006 at the Fundidora Park Circuit.

== Results ==
=== Qualification ===
Qualification took place on Saturday, February 25, 2006.

Pos	Team	Driver	Q1 Time	Q2 Time	Q3 Time	Q4 Time	Aggregate	Gap
1	South Africa	Stephen Simpson	1'25.394	1'22.817	1'23.638	1'22.078	2'44.895	
2	France	Alexandre Premat	1'24.908	1'24.581	1'23.533	1'22.315	2'45.848	0.953
3	Switzerland	Neel Jani	1'25.419	1'23.442	1'23.942	1'22.705	2'46.147	1.252
4	Italy	Enrico Toccacelo	1'26.744	1'23.353	1'26.214	1'23.304	2'46.657	1.762
5	(United States) USA	Bryan Herta	1'27.369	1'25.756	1'24.211	1'22.609	2'46.820	1.925
6	Czech Republic	Tomáš Enge	1'27.380	1'25.340	1'23.658	1'23.236	2'46.894	1.999
7	The Netherlands	Jos Verstappen	1'27.422	1'23.678	1'25.160	1'23.297	2'46.975	2.080
8	(Republic of Ireland) Ireland	Ralph Firman	1'26.193	1'23.552	1'24.142	1'23.439	2'46.991	2.096
9	Brazil	Christian Fittipaldi	1'26.944	1'23.454	1'24.441	1'23.612	2'47.066	2.171
10	Portugal	Alvaro Parente	1'27.220	1'25.012	1'25.181	1'23.059	2'48.071	3.176
11	Malaysia	Alex Yoong	1'26.796	1'24.938	1'25.738	1'23.509	2'48.447	3.552
12	Germany	Timo Scheider	1'27.572	1'25.971	1'24.834	1'23.976	2'48.810	3.915
13	New Zealand	Matt Halliday	1'26.625	1'27.388	1'25.081	1'23.944	2'49.025	4.130
14	Mexico	Salvador Durán	1'27.778	1'25.343	1'25.357	1'23.747	2'49.090	4.195
15	(United Kingdom) Great Britain	Robbie Kerr	1'25.493	1'24.563	1'24.738	1'24.584	2'49.147	4.252
16	Lebanon	Graham Rahal	1'31.310	1'25.856	1'25.588	1'23.678	2'49.266	4.371
17	Japan	Hayanari Shimoda	1'27.906	1'25.181	1'25.602	1'24.183	2'49.364	4.469
18	Austria	Patrick Friesacher	1'27.117	1'25.029	1'25.127	1'24.364	2'49.393	4.498
19	Canada	Patrick Carpentier	1'27.010		1'25.603	1'23.908	2'49.511	4.616
20	Indonesia	Ananda Mikola	1'27.655	1'26.565	1'25.738	1'24.431	2'50.169	5.274
21	Australia	Christian Jones	1'32.131	1'28.912	1'27.757	1'26.359	2'54.116	9.221
22	China	Ma Qinghua	1'31.119	1'41.920	1'28.842	1'27.558	2'56.400	11.505

=== Sprint Race Results ===
The Sprint Race took place on Sunday, February 26, 2006.

Pos	Team	Driver	Laps	Time	Points
1	France	Alexandre Premat	18	29:20.7	10
2	Switzerland	Neel Jani	18	+0.283	9
3	Italy	Enrico Toccacelo	18	+0.874	8
4	The Netherlands	Jos Verstappen	18	+2.141	7
5	Czech Republic	Tomáš Enge	18	+13.553	6
6	(United States) USA	Bryan Herta	18	+20.079	5
7	Malaysia	Alex Yoong	18	+22.870	4
8	Germany	Timo Scheider	18	+23.357	3
9	Canada	Patrick Carpentier	18	+26.236	2
10	Austria	Patrick Friesacher	18	+26.911	1
11	(United Kingdom) Great Britain	Robbie Kerr	18	+28.701	
12	Indonesia	Ananda Mikola	18	+38.460	
13	Lebanon	Graham Rahal	18	+41.406	
14	Brazil	Christian Fittipaldi	18	+50.749	
15	China	Tengyi Jiang	18	+51.721	
16	Australia	Christian Jones	18	+1'12.442	
17	South Africa	Stephen Simpson	9	+9 Laps	
18	New Zealand	Matt Halliday	4	+14 Laps	
19	Portugal	Alvaro Parente	4	+14 Laps	
20	Japan	Hayanari Shimoda	3	+15 Laps	
21	(Republic of Ireland) Ireland	Ralph Firman	0	+18 Laps	
22	Mexico	Salvador Durán	0	+18 Laps	

=== Main Race Results ===
The Main Race took place on Sunday, February 26, 2006.

Pos	Team	Driver	Laps	Time	Points
1	France	Alexandre Premat	36	52:26.7	10
2	The Netherlands	Jos Verstappen	36	+0.780	9
3	Switzerland	Neel Jani	36	+3.525	8
4	Germany	Timo Scheider	36	+4.588	7
5	Italy	Enrico Toccacelo	36	+4.994	6
6	(United Kingdom) Great Britain	Robbie Kerr	36	+11.502	5
7	Czech Republic	Tomáš Enge	36	+14.840	4
8	New Zealand	Matt Halliday	36	+18.828	3
9	Austria	Patrick Friesacher	36	+19.140	2
10	Portugal	Alvaro Parente	36	+19.577	1
11	Malaysia	Alex Yoong	36	+23.000	
12	Brazil	Christian Fittipaldi	36	+23.561	
13	(United States) USA	Bryan Herta	36	+23.876	
14	Lebanon	Graham Rahal	36	+25.517	
15	Canada	Patrick Carpentier	35	+1 Lap	
16	Indonesia	Ananda Mikola	35	+1 Lap	
17	China	Tengyi Jiang	35	+1 Lap	
18	South Africa	Stephen Simpson	35	+1 Lap	
19	Australia	Christian Jones	20	+16 Laps	
20	(Republic of Ireland) Ireland	Ralph Firman	16	+20 Laps	
21	Mexico	Salvador Durán	6	+30 Laps	
22	Japan	Hayanari Shimoda	DNS	+36 Laps	

=== Total Points ===
Team	Points	SR	MR	FL
France	21	10	10	1
Switzerland	17	9	8	--
The Netherlands	16	7	9	--
Italy	14	8	6	--
Czech Republic	10	6	4	--
Germany	10	3	7	--
(United Kingdom) Great Britain	5	--	5	--
(United States) USA	5	5	--	--
Malaysia	4	4	--	--
Austria	3	1	2	--
New Zealand	3	--	3	--
Canada	2	2	--	--
Portugal	1	--	1	--

- Fastest Lap: A1 Team France (1'21.100 / 150.3 km/h, lap 17 of Main Race)
