= 2005 Dubai A1GP round =

2005-06 A1GP of United Arab Emirates

Race Details
- Race 6 of 11 in the 2005-06 A1 Grand Prix season
- Date: December 11, 2005
- Location: Dubai Autodrome; Dubai, United Arab Emirates
- Weather: Fine, 27 °C

Qualifying
- Pole: Switzerland (Neel Jani)
- Time: 3'31.918 (1'45.926, 1'45.992)

Sprint Race
- 1st: Switzerland (Neel Jani)
- 2nd: Italy (Enrico Toccacelo)
- 3rd: Czech Republic (Tomáš Enge)

Main Race
- 1st: France (Nicolas Lapierre)
- 2nd: Great Britain (Robbie Kerr)
- 3rd: South Africa (Stephen Simpson)

Fast Lap
- FL: Ireland (Ralph Firman)
- Time: 1'46.497, (Lap 3 of Main Race)

Official Classifications
- Prac1 ·Prac2 ·Prac3 ·Qual ·SRace ·MRace

Layout of the Dubai Autodrome GP circuit

The 2005-06 A1 Grand Prix of Nations, United Arab Emirates was held on the weekend of December 11, 2005 at the Dubai Autodrome.

== Report ==
=== Qualifying ===
Session One of Qualifying was red-flagged after Salvador Durán of Mexico suffered a bad accident.

== Results ==
=== Qualification ===
Qualification took place on Saturday, December 10, 2005.

Pos	Team	Driver	Q1 Time	Q2 Time	Q3 Time	Q4 Time	Aggregate	Gap
1	Switzerland	Neel Jani	--	1'46.383	1'45.992	1'45.926	3'31.918	--
2	France	Nicolas Lapierre	--	--	1'46.285	1'46.266	3'32.551	0.633
3	(Republic of Ireland) Ireland	Ralph Firman	--	1'47.047	1'46.459	1'46.167	3'32.626	0.708
4	Brazil	Nelson Piquet Jr.	--	1'46.514	1'46.113	1'46.721	3'32.627	0.709
5	(United Kingdom) Great Britain	Robbie Kerr	--	1'46.964	1'46.201	1'46.433	3'32.634	0.716
6	Germany	Adrian Sutil	--	1'47.112	1'46.489	1'46.616	3'33.105	1.187
7	Czech Republic	Tomáš Enge	--	1'47.530	1'46.539	1'46.768	3'33.307	1.389
8	Malaysia	Alex Yoong	--	1'47.942	1'46.934	1'46.386	3'33.320	1.402
9	Canada	Sean McIntosh	--	1'47.503	1'46.856	1'46.985	3'33.841	1.923
10	Portugal	Alvaro Parente	--	1'48.063	1'47.284	1'46.834	3'34.118	2.200
11	Italy	Enrico Toccacelo	--	1'47.658	1'47.201	1'46.940	3'34.141	2.223
12	Indonesia	Ananda Mikola	--	1'48.492	1'47.214	1'47.019	3'34.233	2.315
13	South Africa	Stephen Simpson	--	1'48.046	1'47.309	1'46.943	3'34.252	2.334
14	Japan	Hayanari Shimoda	--	1'48.114	1'46.772	1'47.730	3'34.502	2.584
15	(United States) USA	Philip Giebler	1'47.828	1'48.017	1'47.312	1'47.380	3'34.692	2.774
16	China	Tengyi Jiang	--	1'50.341	1'47.547	1'47.378	3'34.925	3.007
17	New Zealand	Matt Halliday	--	1'47.774	1'47.569	1'47.407	3'34.976	3.058
18	India	Armaan Ebrahim	1'49.740	1'48.324	1'47.383	1'47.624	3'35.007	3.089
19	Netherlands	Jos Verstappen	--	1'48.148	1'47.515	1'47.559	3'35.074	3.156
20	Pakistan	Adam Khan	--	1'48.029	1'47.154	1'48.379	3'35.183	3.265
21	Austria	Mathias Lauda	--	1'50.245	1'48.169	1'47.812	3'35.981	4.063
22	Australia	Christian Jones	1'48.824	1'48.637	1'49.336	1'47.639	3'36.276	4.358
23	Lebanon	Basil Shaaban	1'59.641	1'49.696	1'48.373	--	3'38.069	6.151
24	Mexico	Salvador Durán	--	1'48.002	--	--	1'48.002	--

=== Sprint Race Results ===
The Sprint Race took place on Sunday, December 11, 2005.

Pos	Team	Driver	Laps	Time	Points
1	Switzerland	Neel Jani	15	26:56.613	10
2	Italy	Enrico Toccacelo	15	+8.247	9
3	Czech Republic	Tomáš Enge	15	+9.024	8
4	(Republic of Ireland) Ireland	Ralph Firman	15	+9.961	7
5	Canada	Sean McIntosh	15	+11.192	6
6	Indonesia	Ananda Mikola	15	+13.396	5
7	France	Nicolas Lapierre	15	+13.926	4
8	Portugal	Alvaro Parente	15	+14.884	3
9	(United Kingdom) Great Britain	Robbie Kerr	15	+15.437	2
10	Malaysia	Alex Yoong	15	+16.621	1
11	Netherlands	Jos Verstappen	15	+17.610	
12	South Africa	Stephen Simpson	15	+18.306	
13	(United States) USA	Philip Giebler	15	+22.042	
14	Japan	Hayanari Shimoda	15	+23.367	
15	New Zealand	Matt Halliday	15	+28.865	
16	Pakistan	Adam Khan	15	+29.397	
17	Austria	Mathias Lauda	15	+30.688	
18	Mexico	Salvador Durán	15	+31.669	
19	China	Tengyi Jiang	15	+35.119	
20	India	Armaan Ebrahim	15	+44.885	
21	Australia	Will Davison	14	+1 Lap	
22	Germany	Adrian Sutil	2	+13 Laps	
23	Brazil	Nelson Piquet Jr.	1	+14 Laps	
24	Lebanon	Basil Shaaban	DNS	+15 Laps	

=== Main Race Results ===
The Main Race took place on Sunday, December 11, 2005.

Pos	Team	Driver	Laps	Time	Points
1	France	Nicolas Lapierre	30	56:17.068	10
2	(United Kingdom) Great Britain	Robbie Kerr	30	+3.714	9
3	South Africa	Stephen Simpson	30	+6.690	8
4	Portugal	Alvaro Parente	30	+7.999	7
5	China	Tengyi Jiang	30	+30.788	6
6	Canada	Sean McIntosh	30	+31.343	5
7	Austria	Mathias Lauda	30	+34.442	4
8	Mexico	Salvador Durán	30	+35.502	3
9	Netherlands	Jos Verstappen	30	+36.145	2
10	Australia	Will Davison	30	+36.346	1
11	Italy	Enrico Toccacelo	30	+36.932	
12	Germany	Adrian Sutil	30	+37.848	
13	New Zealand	Matt Halliday	30	+49.124	
14	India	Armaan Ebrahim	30	+49.448	
15	Japan	Hayanari Shimoda	29	+1 Lap	
16	Lebanon	Basil Shaaban	29	+1 Lap	
17	Switzerland	Neel Jani	27	+3 Laps	
18	Czech Republic	Tomáš Enge	27	+3 Laps	
19	Pakistan	Adam Khan	26	+4 Laps	
20	(United States) USA	Philip Giebler	26	+4 Laps	
21	(Republic of Ireland) Ireland	Ralph Firman	7	+23 Laps	
22	Indonesia	Ananda Mikola	5	+25 Laps	
23	Brazil	Nelson Piquet Jr.	4	+26 Laps	
24	Malaysia	Alex Yoong	2	+28 Laps	

=== Total Points ===
Team	Points	SR	MR	FL
France	14	4	10	--
Canada	11	6	5	--
(United Kingdom) Great Britain	11	2	9	--
Portugal	10	3	7	--
Switzerland	10	10	--	--
Italy	9	9	--	--
Czech Republic	8	8	--	--
(Republic of Ireland) Ireland	8	7	--	1
South Africa	8	--	8	--
China	6	--	6	--
Indonesia	5	5	--	--
Austria	4	--	4	--
Mexico	3	--	3	--
Netherlands	2	--	2	--
Australia	1	--	1	--
Malaysia	1	1	--	--

- Fastest Lap: A1 Team Ireland (1'46.497 / 182.2 km/h, lap 3 of Main Race)
