= Jonathan Summerton =

American race car driver (born 1988)

- Nationality: (United States) American
- Born: April 21, 1988 (age 38) Kissimmee, Florida, U.S.

American Le Mans Series
- Categorisation: FIA Gold (until 2015); FIA Silver (2016–)
- Years active: 2012–2013
- Teams: Rahal Letterman Racing; BMW
- Starts: 4
- Wins: 1
- Poles: 0
- Fastest laps: 3

Previous series
- 2009–2010 2008–2009 2006–2008 2006–2007 2004–2005 2004–2005: Indy Lights; Atlantic Championship; A1 Grand Prix; Formula Three Euro Series; Formula BMW USA; Formula BMW ADAC

Jonathan Summerton (born April 21, 1988) is an American race car driver.

== Early life ==
Summerton was born Kissimmee, Florida.

== Early racing ==
Summerton began racing karts at the age of 14 and by the end of the year had begun racing Skip Barber Series cars. In 2004, he began racing in Formula BMW USA and won the Formula BMW USA Scholarship to race in the USA, where in his first year with several wins and fastest laps, he came second in the championship. The following year, he entered the BMW international series where he finished second at Spa-Francorchamps and finished tenth in the championship. In 2006, he competed in Formula Three Euro Series where he finished third at Spa, second at LeMans, and won the final Hockenheim race. He then finished ninth in the championship.

== A1 Grand Prix ==
In 2007, Summerton made starts in the A1 Grand Prix series for A1 Team USA and took second in the feature race at Autódromo Hermanos Rodríguez in Mexico City. For the rest of 2007, he drove a partial season in F3 EuroSeries after being the test driver in the debut of the new Volkswagen engine for RC Motorsport and tested a Champ Car Atlantic Series car for Derrick Walker. He returned to A1 Team USA for the 2007–08 A1 Grand Prix season. Summerton captured A1 Team USA's first A1GP victory in the feature race at Shanghai. The American team would eventually finish 12th in the championship, with Summerton finishing second in the final sprint race of the campaign, at Brands Hatch.

== Atlantics and Indy Lights ==
For the 2008 season, Summerton raced in the Atlantic Championship for Newman Wachs Racing winning two races and finishing third in points. He was signed by the USF1 team to be its main driver but the team later folded due to lack of funding. For the 2009 season, he signed with RLR/Andersen Racing to race in the Firestone Indy Lights Series in addition to competing in Atlantics races with Genoa Racing. He later switched teams and returned to Newman Wachs Racing after Genoa shut down and finished in a first-place tie to teammate John Edwards, but lost the tiebreaker. His Indy Lights season came to an end with a crash at the Milwaukee Mile and the team brought on pay drivers to complete the season in the No. 9 car. He finished second in his first Indy Lights start on the Streets of St. Petersburg and was in the top-five in the championship at the time of his departure, even leading the championship after the first three races of the season. He made one start in 2010 for Walker Racing before being replaced by Dan Clarke.

== Sports car racing ==
After two years on the sidelines, Summerton was signed to Rahal Letterman Lanigan Racing for the 2012 12 Hours of Sebring along with fellow BMW drivers Joey Hand and Dirk Müller in the GTLM class, where they won in their class and finished 18th overall. Summerton set fastest race laps at two events along with finishing third at the Petit LeMans.

== Racing record ==
=== Complete Formula 3 Euro Series results ===
(key) (Races in bold indicate pole position) (Races in italics indicate fastest lap)

Year	Entrant	Chassis	Engine	1	2	3	4	5	6	7	8	9	10	11	12	13	14	15	16	17	18	19	20	DC	Points
2006	ASL Mücke Motorsport	Dallara F305/028	Mercedes	HOC1; 1 Ret	HOC1; 2; 11	LAU; 1; 4	LAU; 2; 7	OSC; 1; 17	OSC; 2 Ret	BRH; 1; 12	BRH; 2; 10	NOR; 1; 3	NOR; 2; 13	NÜR; 1; 24	NÜR; 2; 16	ZAN; 1; 6	ZAN; 2; 17	CAT; 1 Ret	CAT; 2 Ret	BUG; 1; 2	BUG; 2; 4	HOC2; 1; 8	HOC2; 2; 1	9th	32
2007	RC Motorsport	Dallara F306/028	Volkswagen	HOC1; 1	HOC1; 2	BRH; 1	BRH; 2	NOR; 1	NOR; 2	MAG; 1	MAG; 2	MUG; 1	MUG; 2	ZAN; 1	ZAN; 2	NÜR; 1; 18	NÜR; 2; 15	CAT; 1; 16	CAT; 2 Ret	NOG; 1; 14	NOG; 2; 12	HOC2; 1	HOC2; 2	NC†	0

† – As Summerton was a guest driver, he was ineligible for points.

=== Complete A1 Grand Prix results ===
(key) (Races in bold indicate pole position) (Races in italics indicate fastest lap)

Year	Entrant	1	2	3	4	5	6	7	8	9	10	11	12	13	14	15	16	17	18	19	20	21	22	DC	Points
2006–07	USA	NED; SPR	NED; FEA	CZE; SPR	CZE; FEA	BEI; SPR	BEI; FEA	MYS; SPR	MYS; FEA	IDN; SPR	IDN; FEA	NZL; SPR	NZL; FEA	AUS; SPR	AUS; FEA	RSA; SPR; Ret	RSA; FEA; Ret	MEX; SPR; 5	MEX; FEA; 2	SHA; SPR; 5	SHA; FEA; Ret	GBR; SPR; 9	GBR; SPR; 6	9th	42
2007–08	USA	NED; SPR	NED; FEA	CZE; SPR	CZE; FEA	MYS; SPR; 12	MYS; FEA; 10	ZHU; SPR; 12	ZHU; FEA; 10	NZL; SPR; 7	NZL; FEA; 14	AUS; SPR; 5	AUS; FEA; Ret	RSA; SPR; 10	RSA; FEA; Ret	MEX; SPR; 5	MEX; FEA; 3	SHA; SPR; 21	SHA; FEA; 1	GBR; SPR; 2	GBR; SPR; 12			12th	56

=== American open-wheel racing results ===
(key) (Races in bold indicate pole position) (Races in italics indicate fastest lap)

==== Atlantic Championship ====
Year	Team	1	2	3	4	5	6	7	8	9	10	11	12	Rank	Points
2008	Newman Wachs Racing	LBH; 4	LS; 6	MTT; 12	EDM1; 6	EDM2; 1	ROA1; Ret	ROA2; 1	TRR; 2	NJ; 3	UTA; 2	**ATL**; Ret		**3rd**	**224**
2009	Genoa Racing	**SEB**; 3	UTA; 6	**NJ1**; 1	NJ2; 2									**2nd**	**182**
2009	Newman Wachs Racing					LIM; 4	ACC1; 2	ACC2; Ret	**MOH**; 1	TRR; 3	**MOS**; 1	**ATL**; 1	LS; 2	**2nd**	**182**

==== Indy Lights ====
Year	Team	1	2	3	4	5	6	7	8	9	10	11	12	13	14	15	Rank	Points
2009	RLR/Andersen Racing	STP1; 2	STP2; 4	LBH; 4	KAN; 7	INDY; 12	MIL; 16	IOW	WGL	TOR	EDM	KTY	MOH	SNM	CHI	HMS	**17th**	**162**
2010	Walker Racing	STP; 8	ALA	LBH	INDY	IOW	WGL	TOR	EDM	MOH	SNM	CHI	KTY	HMS			**28th**	**24**
