= Dave Stubbs =

Formula E team principal

- Born: 1956 or 1957 (age 68–69)

David Stubbs (born 1956/1957) is a British team principal of the Techeetah Formula E team. He previously worked as team manager in the Williams and Jaguar Formula One teams.

== Career ==
Stubbs began working for Williams in 1978. After becoming team manager in 1985, he then had a brief spell at Brabham in 1989, before joining the Paul Stewart Racing team, which he worked for predominantly in Formula 3000 before moving with the Stewart family into F1 in 1997.

He then stayed with the team after it was acquired by Jaguar and was also part of the Milton Keynes based team's set-up when Red Bull took over in 2005.

Stubbs also worked for the A1 Grand Prix series A1 Team Netherlands squad before joining Status Grand Prix.

On 29 November 2016, Stubbs was confirmed by Techeetah Formula E as team manager.
