= 2008 Eastern Creek A1GP round =

Motorsports race

Coordinates: 33°48′21.2″S 150°52′17″E

2007–08 A1GP of Australia

Race Details
- Race 6 of 10 in the 2007–08 A1 Grand Prix season
- Date: 3 February 2008
- Location: Eastern Creek Raceway; Sydney, New South Wales, Australia
- Weather: variable (dry and wet)

Sprint race

Qualifying
- Pole: France (Loïc Duval)
- Time: 1'18.149

Podium
- 1st: France (Loïc Duval)
- 2nd: New Zealand (Johnny Reid)
- 3rd: Canada (Robert Wickens)

Fastest Lap
- FL: France (Loïc Duval)
- Time: 1'19.350, (Lap 2)

Feature race

Qualifying
- Pole: New Zealand (Jonny Reid)
- Time: 1'18.578

Podium
- 1st: South Africa (Adrian Zaugg)
- 2nd: Switzerland (Neel Jani)
- 3rd: Great Britain (Robbie Kerr)

Fastest Lap
- FL: South Africa (Adrian Zaugg)
- Time: 1'39.034, (Lap 33)

Official Classifications
- PDF Booklet

The 2007–08 A1 Grand Prix of Nations, Australia is an A1 Grand Prix race held on 3 February 2008 at the Eastern Creek Raceway in Sydney, Australia. This was the sixth race in the 2007–08 A1 Grand Prix season.

== Pre-race ==
Fairuz Fauzy who drove in the inaugural 2005–06 season replace this weekend Alex Yoong in the A1 Team Malaysia car. Yoong had the longest run of consecutive starts with 45 successive starts.

For his home race, A1 Team Australia renamed its cars as Jackaroo. The name was chosen between the Australian symbol propositions done by fan in the official team site.

Since Taupo round, A1GP cars used a 30 per cent biofuel mix. A1 Grand Prix continued its environmental campaign in Australia using electric generators for all the paddock's temporary and ancillary structures provided by Active Power Management and initiated by THINK Greener Racing.

== Qualifications ==
Once again, the practice sessions were dominated by France in Friday wet and Saturday humid weather conditions.

On Friday night, Portugal practice their pit stops and a tyre gun hose that became disconnected hit accidentally the leg of James Goodfield, the race engeener of the next door garage, Great Britain. James Goodfield sustain a broken leg and was carry up to the hospital.

Chris Alajajian, driver of the Lebanon, made a mistake on his first out lap for Sprint race qualifying spinning and hitting the tyre barriers at Turn 5. The car was too much damaged to complete a flying lap during qualifying sessions. Lebanon after hard work to repair the car during the night, started both the Sunday races from the last grid position.

Canada was penalised because its driver, Robert Wickens, did not respect blue flags during the feature race qualifying, hampering Sérgio Jimenez (Brazil). Robert Wickens lost his 8th qualifying position to 21st.

Sprint race qualifications
Pos	Team	Time	Gap
1	France	1'18.149	-
2	Switzerland	1'18.218	+0.069
3	South Africa	1'18.243	+0.094
4	New Zealand	1'18.368	+0.219
5	China	1'18.370	+0.221
6	(United States) USA	1'18.464	+0.315
7	Germany	1'18.632	+0.483
8	(United Kingdom) Great Britain	1'18.649	+0.500
9	Australia	1'18.690	+0.541
10	Netherlands	1'18.804	+0.655
11	Brazil	1'18.811	+0.662
12	(Republic of Ireland) Ireland	1'18.929	+0.780
13	India	1'19.004	+0.855
14	Czech Republic	1'19.099	+0.950
15	Canada	1'19.197	+1.048
16	Malaysia	1'19.384	+1.235
17	Portugal	1'19.492	+1.343
18	Pakistan	1'19.623	+1.474
19	Mexico	1'19.785	+1.636
20	Italy	1'19.975	+1.826
21	Indonesia	1'20.154	+2.005
22	Lebanon (1)	no time	-

Main race qualifications
Pos	Team	Time	Gap
1	New Zealand	1'18.578	-
2	Switzerland	1'18.590	+0.012
3	(United Kingdom) Great Britain	1'18.720	+0.142
4	China	1'18.825	+0.247
5	France	1'18.829	+0.251
6	South Africa	1'18.922	+0.344
7	(United States) USA	1'18.976	+0.398
8	Czech Republic	1'19.232	+0.654
9	Brazil	1'19.235	+0.657
10	Malaysia	1'19.252	+0.674
11	Netherlands	1'19.487	+0.909
12	Germany	1'19.516	+0.938
13	Mexico	1'19.529	+0.951
14	Australia	1'19.611	+1.033
15	(Republic of Ireland) Ireland	1'19.706	+1.128
16	Portugal	1'19.733	+1.155
17	Pakistan	1'19.852	+1.274
18	India	1'19.878	+1.300
19	Italy	1'20.051	+1.473
20	Indonesia	1'20.133	+1.555
21	Canada (2)	1'19.199	+0.621
22	Lebanon (1)	no time	-

- (1) = No time for A1 Team Lebanon due to crash during Sprint qualifying.
- (2) = A1 Team Canada was penalised for blue flag disrecpet, losing its 8th position.

== Sprint race ==
This race is known as 'the race of two-halves' due to the track being dry in the first half with 27 °C, then become extremely difficult and wet. In first lap, the order is France, Switzerland, South Africa, New Zealand, Great Britain with a great start from the 8th, China, Germany and USA. Pakistan crash out in the first lap. Loïc Duval (France) made the fastest lap in Lap 2 and is pulling away.
In lap 7, the rain start and Adrian Zaugg (South Africa) is slipping down at Turn 1. Narain Karthikeyan (India) is going off too. Great Britain and Indonesia enter into the pits for wet tyres in lap 9. Cong Fu Cheng (China) spins off in Lap 10, Adam Carroll (Ireland) the next lap.
Robert Wickens (Canada) made an amazing race. He passes Ireland and Netherlands in Lap 11 takink 7th. At Turn 1, next lap, it grabs the 4th position passing four cars including Germany. One lap before the end of the Sprint race, France is leading followed by New Zealand, Switzerland, Canada, Germany, USA, Australia and South Africa.
Neel Jani (Switzerland) spin in the final lap. Loïc Duval (France) in his final round of racing for this A1GP season due to commitments in Japan, converted his pole position with a very comfortable win and breaking the 37-race win-drought, when France was a dominant team in A1GP's debut season. The final standing is France, New Zealand, Canada taking advantage of the rain and took a chance on not switching for wet tyre to climb from 15th, Germany, USA, Australia, South Africa, Brazil, Netherlands and Switzerland in 10th.

Pos	Team	Driver	Laps	Time	Points
1	France	Loïc Duval	14	20'18.536	15+1
2	New Zealand	Jonny Reid	14	+9.198	12
3	Canada	Robert Wickens	14	+11.016	10
4	Germany	Michael Ammermüller	14	+11.929	8
5	(United States) USA	Jonathan Summerton	14	+12.604	6
6	Australia	John Martin	14	+14.210	5
7	South Africa	Adrian Zaugg	14	+14.523	4
8	Brazil	Sérgio Jimenez	14	+30.260	3
9	Netherlands	Jeroen Bleekemolen	14	+33.471	2
10	Switzerland	Neel Jani	14	+33.806	1
11	India	Narain Karthikeyan	14	+44.742	
12	Portugal	João Urbano	14	+46.131	
13	Italy	Edoardo Piscopo	14	+46.196	
14	China	Cong Fu Cheng	14	+49.423	
15	(Republic of Ireland) Ireland	Adam Carroll	14	+50.300	
16	(United Kingdom) Great Britain	Robbie Kerr	14	+56.715	
17	Mexico	David Garza Perez	14	+1'02.846	
18	Czech Republic	Tomáš Enge	14	+1'03.033	
19	Lebanon	Chris Alajajian	14	+1'05.029	
20	Malaysia	Fairuz Fauzy	14	+1'20.880	
21	Indonesia	Satrio Hermanto	14	+1'22.642	
Ret	Pakistan	Adam Langley-Khan	1	Crash	

== Main race ==
It's 25 °C and soaking wet for the Main race. Jonny Reid (New Zealand), having qualified pole, halt on track after quitting the stand and must start the race from the pitlane. Loïc Duval (France), qualified fifth, is stuck on the grid at the start of the formation lap and must start the race second to last.
After the first lap, Ireland and India enter in pit to change their slicks tyres to wets. The order is Switzerland, Great Britain, South Africa, Brazil, USA, China, Germany, Czech Republic, Netherlands, and Canada. In the third lap, New Zealand is 19th and France 14th. Robert Wickens (Canada) grab the 9th to Tomáš Enge (Czech Republic) in Lap 3. In lap 7, New Zealand is already 14th and France in points at 10th. During Lap 9, Pakistan run off without damage. In the next lap, João Urbano (Portugal) spin off trying passes Chris Alajajian (Lebanon) who run off too. Pakistan, Czech Republic and China receive a drive-through penalty for making a false start. The pit window is now open in Lap 10.
Switzerland and Great Britain pit at same time and leave the stand in the same order. In Lap 13, South Africa leads France by 21 seconds but neither have made their pit stop. Adrian Zaugg (South Africa) take the lead after a quick pit stop in Lap 15. In the same lap, Robbie Kerr (Great Britain) run wide and lost a few seconds meanwhile Jonathan Summerton (USA) has gone off and Robert Wickens (Canada) passes. Finally, France makes is mandatory pit stop and South Africa set the current fastest lap in Lap 16.
After the pit window close, Canada and USA fight for 6th in Lap 17. Loïc Duval (France) join the battle and try to passes Jonathan Summerton (USA). In Lap 22, France hit USA, who give up, and receive a drive-through penalty for avoidable collision. Two laps before the opening of the pit for the second mandatories stops in Lap 26, John Martin (Australia) passes Robert Wickens (Canada).
Cong Fu Cheng (China) loses is 11th to 13th after spin in Lap 28, Satrio Hermanto spin also at turn 1, 2 laps after that. Switzerland takes the fasted lap. During his pit stop on lap 31, the French car have a clutch failure and Loïc Duval must renounce. Canada passes Germany for 6th and South Africa takes again the fasted lap on Lap 33. Later, Cong Fu Cheng (China) passes Narain Karthikeyan (India) for 10th.
The 42nd lap is the last and South Africa win 19.560 seconds behind Switzerland, Great Britain, Brazil, Australia, Canada, Germany, Netherlands, New Zealand and China. New Zealand and France are now tied leading the championship with 96 points.

Pos	Team	Driver	Laps	Time	Points
1	South Africa	Adrian Zaugg	42	1:12'00.930	15+1
2	Switzerland	Neel Jani	42	+19.560	12
3	(United Kingdom) Great Britain	Robbie Kerr	42	+25.194	10
4	Brazil	Sérgio Jimenez	42	+42.770	8
5	Australia	John Martin	42	+1'08.647	6
6	Canada	Robert Wickens	42	+1'10.321	5
7	Germany	Christian Vietoris	42	+1'16.299	4
8	Netherlands	Jeroen Bleekemolen	42	+1'17.155	3
9	New Zealand	Jonny Reid	42	+1'22.447	2
10	China	Cong Fu Cheng	42	+1'33.913	1
11	India	Narain Karthikeyan	42	+1'35.414	
12	Pakistan	Adam Langley-Khan	42	+1'39.496	
13	(Republic of Ireland) Ireland	Adam Carroll	41	+1 lap	
14	Italy	Edoardo Piscopo	41	+1 lap	
15	Czech Republic	Tomáš Enge	41	+1 lap	
16	Portugal	João Urbano	41	+1 lap	
17	Malaysia	Fairuz Fauzy	41	+1 lap	
18	Mexico	David Garza Perez	41	+1 lap	
19	Lebanon	Chris Alajajian	40	+2 laps	
20	Indonesia	Satrio Hermanto	39	+3 laps	
Ret	France	Loïc Duval	31	Clutch	
Ret	(United States) USA	Jonathan Summerton	20	Collision	

== After race ==
Due to commitment to race in Japan (Formula Nippon and Super GT) agreed before the start of the A1GP season, Loïc Duval announced he will not drive for France for the final three rounds of the 2007–08. His participation for the next South African round on 24 February was only confirmed 22 February.

== Notes ==
- It was the 28th race weekend (56 starts).
- It was the third venue in Eastern Creek Raceway and in Australia.
- It was the first race weekend for Jonathan Cochet and Michael Klein.
- Records :
  - France even up the 6 pole position of Switzerland.
  - France score 10 fastest laps (6 rewarded by points).
  - Lebanon participate on 28 rounds (56 starts) without won points since their first Grand Prix.
  - Neel Jani score 232 points.
