= 2007 Zhuhai A1GP round =

2007-08 A1GP of Zhuhai, China

Race Details
- Race 4 of 10 in the 2007-08 A1 Grand Prix season
- Date: December 16, 2007
- Location: Zhuhai International Circuit; Zhuhai, China

Sprint race

Qualifying
- Pole: Germany (M.Ammermüller)
- Time: 1'23.203

Podium
- 1st: Germany (M.Ammermüller)
- 2nd: Switzerland (Neel Jani)
- 3rd: China (Cong Fu Cheng)

Fastest Lap
- FL: Switzerland (Neel Jani)
- Time: 1'24.418, (Lap 11)

Feature race

Qualifying
- Pole: Switzerland (Neel Jani)
- Time: 1'23.465

Podium
- 1st: India (Narain Karthikeyan)
- 2nd: New Zealand (Jonny Reid)
- 3rd: South Africa (Adrian Zaugg)

Fastest Lap
- FL: Great Britain (Oliver Jarvis)
- Time: 1'24.703, (Lap 29)

Official Classifications
- PDF Booklet

The 2007–08 A1 Grand Prix of Nations, Zhuhai, China was an A1 Grand Prix race held on December 16, 2007, at the Zhuhai International Circuit, China. It was the fourth meeting in the 2007-08 A1 Grand Prix season.

== Pre-race ==
After suffering injuries in a sportscar racing accident in the United States, Tomáš Enge is back to drive the A1 Team Czech Republic car. Erik Janis who drove since the first round in Zandvoort, this season, will be rookie driver.

== Qualifications ==
India and Narain Karthikeyan score the team's best-ever grid slot with a 3rd position in the Main Race.

Sprint race qualifications
Pos	Team	Time	Gap
1	Germany	1'23.203	-
2	Switzerland	1'23.425	+0.222
3	(Republic of Ireland) Ireland	1'23.675	+0.472
4	China	1'23.784	+0.581
5	(United Kingdom) Great Britain	1'23.850	+0.647
6	Czech Republic	1'23.921	+0.718
7	France	1'23.928	+0.725
8	Netherlands	1'23.965	+0.762
9	India	1'23.972	+0.769
10	Canada	1'24.029	+0.826
11	(United States) USA	1'24.104	+0.901
12	Brazil	1'24.141	+0.938
13	New Zealand	1'24.141	+0.938
14	South Africa	1'24.207	+1.004
15	Portugal	1'24.263	+1.060
16	Italy	1'24.307	+1.104
17	Malaysia	1'24.391	+1.188
18	Australia	1'24.770	+1.567
19	Indonesia	1'24.893	+1.690
20	Lebanon	1'24.915	+1.712
21	Pakistan	1'24.958	+1.755
22	Mexico	1'25.246	+2.043

Main race qualifications
Pos	Team	Time	Gap
1	Switzerland	1'23.465	-
2	(United Kingdom) Great Britain	1'23.650	+0.185
3	India	1'23.767	+0.302
4	France	1'23.784	+0.319
5	Germany	1'23.890	+0.425
6	China	1'23.930	+0.465
7	(United States) USA	1'23.992	+0.527
8	Malaysia	1'24.036	+0.571
9	South Africa	1'24.100	+0.635
10	New Zealand	1'24.114	+0.649
11	Canada	1'24.149	+0.684
12	Portugal	1'24.250	+0.785
13	(Republic of Ireland) Ireland	1'24.294	+0.829
14	Brazil	1'24.328	+0.863
15	Lebanon	1'24.328	+0.863
16	Czech Republic	1'24.350	+0.885
17	Pakistan	1'24.378	+0.913
18	Netherlands	1'24.460	+0.995
19	Australia	1'24.538	+1.073
20	Indonesia	1'24.667	+1.202
21	Italy	1'24.810	+1.345
22	Mexico	1'24.886	+1.421

== Sprint race ==
The start make it through but Australia, South Africa, Lebanon and Brazil and Malaysia are all involved in a multi-car crash in turn 5, lap 1 and the Safety car is out. Brazil and South Africa collide and result the Lebanon is out, Malaysia and South Africa retire in the pit and Brazil loses a lap.
Safety car is in on lap 4 and the order is Germany, Switzerland, Ireland, China, Czech Republic and Great Britain. Switzerland come near Germany; China is pushing Ireland hard. In lap 8, Neel Jani (Switzerland) sets the fastest lap and in lap 11 Cong Fu Cheng (China) passes Adam Carroll (Ireland) for 3rd. Ireland fights back until crossing the line.
New Zealand and Canada fight for 10th since Safety car is on and in lap 11, the two cars touch. Canada spins down to 15th. The same lap, Portugal crash at the final turn.
Germany wins its first race of the season in front of Switzerland, China, Ireland, Czech Republic, Great Britain, India, France, Netherlands and New Zealand. A1 Team China and Cong Fu Cheng enjoy their success in their home race.

Pos	Team	Driver	Laps	Time	Grid	Points
1	Germany	Michael Ammermüller	13	20'31.432	1	15
2	Switzerland	Neel Jani	13	+ 0.601	2	12+1
3	China	Cong Fu Cheng	13	+4.632	4	10
4	(Republic of Ireland) Ireland	Adam Carroll	13	+6.707	3	8
5	Czech Republic	Tomáš Enge	13	+7.386	6	6
6	(United Kingdom) Great Britain	Oliver Jarvis	13	+7.865	5	5
7	India	Narain Karthikeyan	13	+8.661	9	4
8	France	Loïc Duval	13	+9.033	7	3
9	Netherlands	Jeroen Bleekemolen	13	+9.650	8	2
10	New Zealand	Jonny Reid	13	+12.992	13	1
11	Italy	Edoardo Piscopo	13	+14.709	16	
12	(United States) USA	Jonathan Summerton	13	+16.895	11	
13	Australia	Ian Dyk	13	+17.169	18	
14	Pakistan	Adam Langley-Khan	13	+20.944	21	
15	Canada	Robert Wickens	13	+21.784	10	
16	Mexico	David Garza Perez	13	+23.388	22	
17	Indonesia	Satrio Hermanto	13	+23.792	19	
18	Brazil	Sérgio Jimenez	12	+1 Lap	12	
19	Portugal	João Urbano	10	+3 Laps	15	
Ret	South Africa	Adrian Zaugg	1	Damage	14	
Ret	Malaysia	Alex Yoong	1	Damage	17	
Ret	Lebanon	Chris Alajajian	0	Collision	20	

== Main race ==
Just before the race, it was announced that the second pit stop window will be between laps 25 and 33. The race start at 15:00, local time. At the first turn, Ireland and Brazil collide and are delayed. Germany ran wide and lost a lot of places. Malaysia stranded out of the track after a collision with New Zealand and the Safety car is out in this first lap. Brazil, with smoke coming out of the car, Canada and Australia comes into pits meanwhile Edoardo Piscopo (Italy) his pulled off onto the side of the circuit.
Robert Wickens retire is car in pit because of mechanical failure the lap before the Safety car is in, on lap 5. Several fight in the next laps. New Zealand has passed China and then USA for 6th. The first pit stop window is open on lap 8 and the current standing is Great Britain, Switzerland with the current fastest lap, India, France, South Africa, New Zealand, China and USA.
Narain Karthikeyan(India), Loïc Duval (France) and Oliver Jarvis (Great Britain) comes in pit. Neel Jani (Switzerland) still out for one more lap during the long pit stop of the British driver. The Netherlands damage the suspension and retire on lap 9. After most of the racers have made their first compulsory stop, Switzerland lead the race. Portugal stack up India, France, Great Britain and South Africa until it goes off on lap 14. The next lap, South Africa passes Great Britain for 5th. In lap 16, after Portugal pit, Switzerland lead from India, New Zealand, France, South Africa and Great Britain.
Australia is back on track after losing 3 laps in garage. France receive a drive-through penalty for clipping USA's left-rear airline as it left the pit box. Loïc Duval return on track on 15th. Chris Alajajian (Lebanon) clips a kerb, spin and lost a lot of time in lap 18. Lap 19, Adam Carroll (Ireland) pull into the pits and Satrio Hermanto (Indonesia) retire into the gravel. France is on a charge, is now 10th and take the fastest lap in lap 21.
The second pit stop window is now open on lap 25. Switzerland have a problem with the right rear tyre and bring the car to the pits but it lost time to take the wheel off. India is now leading. After a slow stop for Great Britain and India, Oliver Jarvis (Great Britain) make the fastest lap on lap 29. China is going to be given a drive-through penalty for speeding in the pits. Now, the standing is India front of New Zealand, South Africa, Germany, Great Britain, Switzerland and France.
Germany and Great Britain are pushing South Africa until the finish line. Cong Fu Cheng (China) is fighting with Jonathan Summerton (USA) since lap 37 and passes in lap 40 when USA has gone wide across the grass. Jonny Reid (New Zealand) is now close from Narain Karthikeyan (India). India wins and score the team's first ever win in A1GP, it is the 14th nation to take a win. The final standing is India, New Zealand, South Africa, Germany, Great Britain with fastest lap, Switzerland, France, Czech Republic, China and USA.

Pos	Team	Driver	Laps	Time	Grid	Points
1	India	Narain Karthikeyan	45	1:08'30.759	3	15
2	New Zealand	Jonny Reid	45	+0.502	10	12
3	South Africa	Adrian Zaugg	45	+4.128	9	10
4	Germany	Michael Ammermüller	45	+4.907	5	8
5	(United Kingdom) Great Britain	Oliver Jarvis	45	+5.267	2	6+1
6	Switzerland	Neel Jani	45	+14.516	1	5
7	France	Loïc Duval	45	+18.572	4	4
8	Czech Republic	Tomáš Enge	45	+27.140	16	3
9	China	Cong Fu Cheng	45	+27.579	6	2
10	(United States) USA	Jonathan Summerton	45	+33.388	7	1
11	Mexico	David Garza Perez	45	+49.353	22	
12	Portugal	João Urbano	45	+1'03.831	12	
13	Lebanon	Chris Alajajian	44	+1 Lap	15	
14	Pakistan	Adam Langley-Khan	44	+1 Lap	17	
15	Australia	Ian Dyk	42	+3 Laps	19	
Ret	(Republic of Ireland) Ireland	Adam Carroll	27	Collision	13	
Ret	Indonesia	Satrio Hermanto	19	Accident	20	
Ret	Netherlands	Jeroen Bleekemolen	9	Suspension	18	
Ret	Canada	Robert Wickens	3	Accident	11	
Ret	Italy	Edoardo Piscopo	1	Damage	21	
Ret	Brazil	Sérgio Jimenez	1	Damage	14	
Ret	Malaysia	Alex Yoong	0	Collision	8	

== After-race ==
After the first win of the A1 Team India in A1 Grand Prix this weekend, on feature race, Dr. Manmohan Singh, the nation's Prime Minister congratulate Narain Karthikeyan and the team. In January 2008, just before the next round, in Taupo, New Zealand, Narain Karthikeyan meets Indian President, Pratibha Patil who congratulate him and the team's achievements in Zuhai.

== Notes ==
- It was the 26th race weekend (52 starts).
- It was the first venue in Zhuhai International Circuit, the fourth in China (including Shanghai and Beijing venues)
- It was the first race for David Garza Perez and Edoardo Piscopo.
- It was the first race weekend for Gonçalo Araújo, Clemente Faria Jr, Alexandre Imperatori, Niall Quinn, David Garza Perez and Danny Watts.
- Records:
  - India won its first race.
  - Switzerland scored 6 poles position.
  - Lebanon participate on 26 rounds (52 starts) without won points since their first Grand Prix.
  - Alex Yoong participate on 25 races (48 starts).
  - Neel Jani won 218 points.
