= Ananda Mikola =

Indonesian racing driver

- Nationality: Indonesian
- Born: Ananda Mikola Soeprapto; 27 April 1980 (age 46) Jakarta, Indonesia
- Relatives: Moreno Soeprapto (brother); Marcella Zalianty (wife)

A1 Grand Prix
- Years active: 2005-06–2006-07
- Teams: A1 Team Indonesia
- Starts: 40
- Wins: 0
- Podiums: 0
- Poles: 0
- Fastest laps: 0
- Best finish: 18th in 2005-06 (Note: Best overall championship result scored by the team, as A1 Grand Prix did not have a drivers' championship.)

Ananda Mikola Soeprapto (born 27 April 1980 in Jakarta) is an Indonesian former racing driver.

Mikola competed in the Italian and International Formula 3000 series from 1999 to 2001 and was champion of Asian F3 in the 2005 season. He is best known for competing in A1 Grand Prix, representing Indonesia for two seasons and scoring a best race finish of fifth.

== Racing history ==
=== Career summary ===
| Season | Series | Team | Races | Wins | Poles | F.Laps | Podiums | Points | Position |
|---|---|---|---|---|---|---|---|---|---|
| 1996 | Italian Formula Three Championship | ? | 1 | 0 | 0 | 0 | 0 | 0 | NC |
| 1996 | Formula Asia | ? | ? | ? | ? | ? | ? | ? | **1st** |
| 1997 | Italian Formula Three Championship | Cevenini Junior | 10 | 0 | 0 | 0 | 0 | 24 | 10th |
| 1998 | Italian Formula Three Championship | RC Motorsport | 10 | 0 | 0 | 1 | 3 | 94 | 5th |
| 1998 | Masters of Formula 3 | RC Motorsport | 1 | 0 | 0 | 0 | 0 | 0 | NC |
| 1999 | Italian Formula 3000 Championship | Edenbridge Racing | 5 | 0 | 1 | 0 | 0 | 4 | 11th |
| 2000 | International Formula 3000 | World Racing Team | 7 | 0 | 0 | 0 | 0 | 0 | NC |
| 2001 | International Formula 3000 | Team Astromega | 3 | 0 | 0 | 0 | 0 | 0 | NC |
| 2003 | World Series Lights | RC Motorsport | 16 | 0 | 1 | 1 | 2 | 92 | 7th |
| 2004 | Asian Formula Three Championship | Kinetic F3 | 4 | 3 | 0 | 2 | 4 | 32 | 7th |
| 2005 | Asian Formula Three Championship | ThreeBond Racing | 12 | 6 | 2 | ? | 10 | 154 | **1st** |
| 2005–06 | A1 Grand Prix | A1 Team Indonesia | 20 | 0 | 0 | 0 | 0 | 16 | 18th |
| 2006 | Formula V6 Asia | Eurasia Motorsport | 12 | 2 | 0 | 0 | 5 | 98 | **3rd** |
| 2006–07 | A1 Grand Prix | A1 Team Indonesia | 20 | 0 | 0 | 0 | 0 | 1 | 21st |
| 2007 | Euroseries 3000 | G-Tec | 2 | 0 | 0 | 0 | 1 | 8 | 15th |
| 2007 | F3000 Italian Championship | G-Tec | 2 | 0 | 0 | 0 | 1 | 8 | 10th |
| 2008 | Speedcar Series | Speedcar Team | 10 | 0 | 1 | 1 | 1 | 17 | 8th |
| 2009 | Porsche Carrera Cup Asia | Humpuss Racing Team | 2 | 0 | 0 | 0 | 0 | 0 | NC |
| 2012 | Superstars Series | Ferlito Motors | 4 | 0 | 0 | 0 | 0 | 17 | 24th |
| 2015 | Lamborghini Super Trofeo Asia - Pro-Am | ? | 1 | 0 | 0 | 0 | 0 | 0 | NC |

=== A1 Grand Prix results ===
(key) (Races in bold indicate pole position) (Races in italics indicate fastest lap)

| Year | Entrant | 1 | 2 | 3 | 4 | 5 | 6 | 7 | 8 | 9 | 10 | 11 | 12 | 13 | 14 | 15 | 16 | 17 | 18 | 19 | 20 | 21 | 22 | DC | Points |
|---|---|---|---|---|---|---|---|---|---|---|---|---|---|---|---|---|---|---|---|---|---|---|---|---|---|
| 2005–06 | Indonesia | GBR; SPR; 17 | GBR; FEA; Ret | GER; SPR; 14 | GER; FEA; 8 | POR; SPR; 9 | POR; FEA; Ret | AUS; SPR | AUS; FEA | MLY; SPR; Ret | MLY; FEA; 14 | UAE; SPR; 6 | UAE; FEA; Ret | RSA; SPR; Ret | RSA; FEA; Ret | INA; SPR; 11 | INA; FEA; 14 | MEX; SPR; 12 | MEX; FEA; 16 | USA; SPR; Ret | USA; FEA; Ret | CHN; SPR; 5 | CHN; FEA; Ret | 18th | 16 |
| 2006–07 | Indonesia | NED; SPR; 19 | NED; FEA; 10 | CZE; SPR; 16 | CZE; FEA; 15 | CHN1; SPR; 15 | CHN1; FEA; Ret | MLY; SPR; Ret | MLY; FEA; 15 | INA; SPR; 14 | INA; FEA; 11 | NZL; SPR; 15 | NZL; FEA; Ret | AUS; SPR; 17 | AUS; FEA; 13 | RSA; SPR; 10 | RSA; FEA; Ret | MEX; SPR; 8 | MEX; FEA; 11 | CHN2; SPR; 13 | CHN2; FEA; 16 | GBR; SPR | GBR; FEA | 21st | 1 |

== Notes ==
Sporting positions
| Preceded by Christian Jones | Asian Formula Three Champion; 2005 | Succeeded by James Winslow |
