= Mark Gallagher =

Formula 1 motor racing executive

- Born: Mark Henry Gallagher; 9 March 1962 (age 64)
- Education: Queen's University Belfast BSSc in Economics & Business Management
- Notable work: Senior F1 Executive, Author & Broadcaster
- Website: www.mark-gallagher.com

Mark Henry Gallagher (born 9 March 1962) is a Formula 1 motor racing executive, public speaker, media commentator and director. He is currently the managing director of Performance Insights Ltd and was the founder and co-owner of Status Grand Prix, which won the 2009 A1 Grand Prix World Cup Motorsport and competed in GP3, GP2 and World Endurance sports car racing.

== Career ==
He began working as a journalist and broadcaster for Formula One F1 in 1986 and later started as a media consultant for major sponsors. He joined Eddie Jordan’s fledgling F1 team for its debut season in 1991 as Press Officer before working with Pacific Racing and on Ford’s WRC programme before returning to Jordan Grand Prix in 1995 where he became Head of Marketing, joining the management board in 1998. Gallagher joined Jaguar Racing in 2004, remaining with the team when it became Red Bull Racing. He was appointed head of the Cosworth F1 engine business in August 2009. He has commentated on Formula One on ESPN Star Sports and BBC Radio 5 Live and has contributed to a wide range of media channels including BBC News, Channel 4 News, CNN, CNBC and Al Jazeera News. He is a columnist and feature writer for Grand Prix Racing magazine in the UK which is part of the Motorsport Network and presents two podcasts; At The Controls cohosted by Jonathan Legard and Inside Formula 1 with Mika Häkkinen. Between 2005 and 2009 Mark Gallagher was engaged by Pixar Animation Studios to consult on Formula 1 during site visits and coordinated the agreement with Formula 1 for the European launch of Cars at the 2006 Spanish Grand Prix.

== Bibliography ==
- Grand Prix – The Last 25 Years (1991)
- The Business of Winning - Strategic Success from the Formula One track to the Boardroom (2014)
- ’’The Business of Winning, 2nd Edition - Transformation from the F1 track to the Boardroom’’ (2021)
