= 2008 Durban A1GP round =

2008 A1 Grand Prix race

2007-08 A1GP of South Africa

Race Details
- Race 7 of 10 in the 2007-08 A1 Grand Prix season
- Date: 24 February 2008
- Location: Durban street circuit Durban, South Africa
- Weather: Dry

Sprint race

Qualifying
- Pole: Canada (Robert Wickens)
- Time: 1'18.150

Podium
- 1st: Canada (Robert Wickens)
- 2nd: Great Britain (Oliver Jarvis)
- 3rd: Switzerland (Neel Jani)

Fastest Lap
- FL: New Zealand (Johnny Reid)
- Time: 1'18.629, (Lap 3)

Feature race

Qualifying
- Pole: Switzerland (Neel Jani)
- Time: 1'17.688

Podium
- 1st: Switzerland (Neel Jani)
- 2nd: France (Loïc Duval)
- 3rd: Portugal (F.Albuquerque)

Fastest Lap
- FL: China (Congfu Cheng)
- Time: 1'18.744, (Lap 35)

Official Classifications
- PDF Booklet

The 2007–08 A1 Grand Prix of Nations, South Africa is an A1 Grand Prix race, held on 24 February 2008 at the Durban street circuit in Durban, South Africa. This is the seventh meeting in the 2007–08 A1 Grand Prix season.

== Pre-race ==
A1 Team New Zealand and France lead the championship by 96 points.

Portugal replace for the rest of the season, their lead driver João Urbano by the newcomer Filipe Albuquerque. For Czech Republic, it was Josef Král that replaced Tomáš Enge for the rest of the season.
Bruno Junqueira and rookie Alexandre Negrão will return for Brazil this weekend as race driver and rookie driver like it was in the 2006-07 season.

Loïc Duval was the race driver despite his commitment in Super GT and Formula Nippon this season. Nicolas Prost ran the Rookie sessions, Jonathan Cochet the Friday practice session and Loïc Duval the Saturday afternoon practice and the both Sunday races traveling from Japan during the Friday to Saturday night. Therefore, 3 different drivers from the same team, France, take part on the race weekend. A1 Team Greece engage also 3 different drivers on the 2006-07, Netherlands but only 2 actually ran.

== Qualifications ==
On the Saturday morning free practice, Narain Karthikeyan was injured after hitting the tyre barriers at the exit of the second turn. The Indian Rookie driver Parthiva Sureshwaren replaces its lead driver, Narain Karthikeyan, who have participate in one run in each Sprint and Feature qualifying sessions putting India in 9th and 17th positions on the starting grids. Parthiva Sureshwaren will muster start from the back of the grid because he did not take part of the qualifying sessions.

During the Sprint Qualification 1, Jonny Reid (New Zealand) spin out and a red flag stop the session. Only Six teams have done hot laps : Germany, India, Pakistan, Australia, Lebanon and Indonesia. In the Sprint Qualification 2, Adrian Zaugg (South Africa) spins out at the first chicane and have no time. South Africa starts from the back of the grid for the Sunday Sprint race. France is hampered by the yellow flag due to Adrian Zaugg and take only the 17th. Adam Carroll (Ireland) isn't able to make a hot lap due to fuel pump problem.

The home South African team realize only the 15th position for the Feature race grid because of electrical glitch and then traffic problems during its qualification laps.

Sprint race qualifications
Pos	Team	Time	Gap
1	Canada	1'18.150	-
2	Brazil	1'18.168	+0.018
3	New Zealand	1'18.229	+0.079
4	(United Kingdom) Great Britain	1'18.410	+0.260
5	Switzerland	1'18.470	+0.320
6	Germany	1'18.650	+0.500
7	Netherlands	1'18.717	+0.567
8	Malaysia	1'19.091	+0.941
9	India (1)	1'19.213	+1.063
10	Portugal	1'19.224	+1.074
11	China	1'19.261	+1.111
12	Australia	1'19.423	+1.273
13	Mexico	1'19.812	+1.662
14	(United States) USA	1'19.815	+1.665
15	Pakistan	1'20.204	+2.054
16	Italy	1'20.294	+2.144
17	France	1'21.310	+3.160
18	Czech Republic	1'21.919	+3.769
19	Lebanon	1'22.050	+3.900
20	Indonesia	1'23.808	+5.658
21	(Republic of Ireland) Ireland	no time	-
22	South Africa	no time	-

Main race qualifications
Pos	Team	Time	Gap
1	Switzerland	1'17.688	-
2	Canada	1'17.810	+0.122
3	New Zealand	1'17.880	+0.192
4	(United Kingdom) Great Britain	1'17.916	+0.228
5	Brazil	1'17.951	+0.263
6	Netherlands	1'18.002	+0.314
7	Germany	1'18.044	+0.356
8	France	1'18.101	+0.413
9	Portugal	1'18.257	+0.569
10	Australia	1'18.716	+1.028
11	China	1'18.780	+1.092
12	Malaysia	1'18.813	+1.125
13	(Republic of Ireland) Ireland	1'18.824	+1.136
14	Pakistan	1'18.917	+1.229
15	South Africa	1'18.925	+1.237
16	(United States) USA	1'18.927	+1.239
17	India (1)	1'18.932	+1.244
18	Italy	1'19.858	+2.170
19	Mexico	1'20.170	+2.482
20	Czech Republic	1'20.369	+2.681
21	Lebanon	1'21.124	+3.436
22	Indonesia	1'21.408	+3.720

- (1) = Narain Karthikeyan had qualified the car for India but was injured later, and replaced by Parthiva Sureshwaren for the balance of the race meet, incurring a penalty of being sent to the rear of the field for the driver change.

== Sprint race ==
It is a sunny 28 °C weather for the Sprint race. India start from the back of the grid because they have replaced their lead driver between qualifying and race sessions. John Martin (Australia) was in hospital overnight suffering from dehydration but he takes part of both races.
Canada take the lead on start and during the first lap, New Zealand damage its nose on Robert Wickens's (Canada) car and was forced to pit for repairs. Brazil try to passes Switzerland in lap 2, but fail and damage its nose too. The order is Canada, Great Britain, Switzerland, Brazil, China, Netherlands, Germany and Australia for 8th. France starting from 17th is already 13th. In lap 5, Brazil fight China, which is now behind, for 4th. But Bruno Junqueira's front wing is too much damaged and he slows targeting pits to change the car's nose.
In lap 7, Neel Jani (Switzerland) is just behind the second, Oliver Jarvis (Great Britain). Adrian Zaugg (South Africa) is now 14th in lap 8, starting second from last. Bruno Junqueira (Brazil) crashes out in Turn 5/6 chicane hitting the wall and the car is stuck out on track. The Safety car is out until lap 11.

Michael Ammermüller (Germany) hit Jeroen Bleekemolen (Netherlands) on final corner and both cars retire but the incident brought out the red flag. For causing this avoidable collision, Germany was excluded from its 6th.

The final order is Canada behind Great Britain, Switzerland, China, Netherlands, Australia, Portugal, Mexico, Malaysia and USA. New Zealand with Jonny Reid score the bonus point for the fastest lap.

Pos	Team	Driver	Laps	Time	Points
1	Canada	Robert Wickens	11	15'28.156	15
2	(United Kingdom) Great Britain	Oliver Jarvis	11	+0.990	12
3	Switzerland	Neel Jani	11	+1.742	10
4	China	Cong Fu Cheng	11	+2.248	8
5	Netherlands	Jeroen Bleekemolen	11	+3.477	6
6	Australia	John Martin	11	+5.337	5
7	Portugal	Filipe Albuquerque	11	+6.449	4
8	Mexico	David Garza Perez	11	+8.343	3
9	Malaysia	Fairuz Fauzy	11	+8.931	2
10	(United States) USA	Jonathan Summerton	11	+10.270	1
11	France	Loïc Duval	11	+11.067	
12	Pakistan	Adam Langley-Khan	11	+11.625	
13	South Africa	Adrian Zaugg	11	+12.074	
14	Italy	Edoardo Piscopo	11	+12.715	
15	(Republic of Ireland) Ireland	Adam Carroll	11	+13.143	
16	Indonesia	Satrio Hermanto	14	+14.579	
17	India	Parthiva Sureshwaren	11	+15.375	
18	Czech Republic	Josef Král	11	+24.147	
19	Lebanon	Khalil Beschir	11	+30.280	
20	New Zealand	Jonny Reid	11	+46.100	+1
DNF	Brazil	Bruno Junqueira	8	Crash	
EX	Germany	Michael Ammermüller	11	+4.602	

== Main race ==
Its a 32 °C when Switzerland take the lead of the race after starting from pole position. China and Portugal collide in first lap and Cong Fu Cheng (China) is stuck in the wall meanwhile Filipe Albuquerque (Portugal) is launched into the air. The Safety car is out. China, Lebanon, USA, Mexico and South Africa goes in pit for minor repairs. On lap 4, the safety car is on and the order is Switzerland, New Zealand, Brazil, Great Britain, Canada, Netherlands, Germany, France, Australia and Ireland. In the first corner again, on lap 4, Australia hits Germany, who spin, and then Ireland. John Martin (Australia) and Adam Carroll (Ireland) are stuck on the track. France is involved but passes without damages. Indonesia piles into Germany and Pakistan into Indonesia, the three teams retire. Safety car is out again. Before the Safety car is on, on lap 9, many drivers get into pits for minors repairs. In lap 10, the first mandatory pit stop is possible.
Jonny Reid (New Zealand) make a long stop changing his front wing because of a collision into pits with David Garza Perez (Mexico). South Africa have a slow pit stop due to sticking wheel and France gain some places staying out more time than its rivals. In lap 13, New Zealand receive a drive-through penalty for his collision with Mexico. Lebanon also gets a drive-through penalty in lap 15. After the first mandatory stop, Switzerland lead Canada, Great Britain, France, Portugal, Netherlands, Malaysia, Brazil, Italy and China. Ireland receive a drive-through penalty in lap 18. Loïc Duval (France) and Oliver Jarvis (Great Britain) fight for 3rd while Cong Fu Cheng (China) get by Edoardo Piscopo (Italy) in lap 23 for ninth. In the next lap, Czech Republic run slowly and reach the pits. USA retire in pits. China passes Brazil for eighth and South Africa, started from 15th enter into the points getting by Italy. India retire from the race because of a black flag in lap 29 for pit stop violation and exceed the pit lane speed limit. The second pit stop window start in lap 30.
South Africa does a faster pit stop and passes Brazil in the pits like Canada taking the lead behind Switzerland. France pits after its adversaries, into lap 32, and passes Great Britain. Jonny Reid (New Zealand) take the fastest lap in lap 34 but Cong Fu Cheng make a better lap time next lap.
In lap 39, Robert Wickens (Canada) spins and Oliver Jarvis (Great Britain) hits him and damage his car's nose. The Safety car is out until lap 41. On first corner, South Africa hits Netherlands, 3rd and involving three other drivers. The safety car is out again, the order its Switzerland, France, Portugal, China, Malaysia but the commissioners red flag the race. The official classification is, at the end of lap 41, Switzerland front of France, Portugal, Netherlands, Malaysia, China, South Africa, Italy, Brazil and New Zealand. The fastest lap is for China.

Pos	Team	Driver	Laps	Time	Points
1	Switzerland	Neel Jani	41	1:01'55.330	15
2	France	Loïc Duval	41	+1.051	12
3	Portugal	Filipe Albuquerque	41	+1.934	10
4	Netherlands	Jeroen Bleekemolen	41	+3.378	8
5	Malaysia	Fairuz Fauzy	41	+4.549	6
6	China	Cong Fu Cheng	41	+4.984	5+1
7	South Africa	Adrian Zaugg	41	+5.640	4
8	Italy	Edoardo Piscopo	41	+6.562	3
9	Brazil	Bruno Junqueira	41	+19.524	2
10	New Zealand	Jonny Reid	41	+20.220	1
11	(United Kingdom) Great Britain	Oliver Jarvis	40	+1 lap	
12	Canada	Robert Wickens	39	+2 laps	
13	Lebanon	Khalil Beschir	39	+2 laps	
14	Australia	John Martin	39	+2 laps	
Ret	(Republic of Ireland) Ireland	Adam Carroll	35	+6 laps	
Ret	Czech Republic	Josef Král	33	+8 laps	
Ret	India	Parthiva Sureshwaren	29	+12 laps	
Ret	(United States) USA	Jonathan Summerton	25	+16 laps	
Ret	Mexico	David Garza Perez	18	+23 laps	
Ret	Germany	Michael Ammermüller	3	Colision	
Ret	Indonesia	Satrio Hermanto	3	Colision	
Ret	Pakistan	Adam Langley-Khan	3	Colision	

== Notes ==
- It was the 29th race weekend (58 starts).
- It was the third venue in Durban street circuit and in South Africa.
- It was the first race for Filipe Albuquerque and Josef Král.
- It was the first race weekend as Rookie driver for Filipe Albuquerque, Josef Král and Daniel Morad.
- Records :
  - Switzerland score 7 pole positions.
  - France engage 3 different drivers for the same weekend : Loïc Duval as race driver, Jonathan Cochet as practice driver and Nicolas Prost as Rookie driver.
  - Lebanon participate on 29 rounds (58 starts) without won points since their first Grand Prix.
  - Robert Wickens became the youngest polesitter aged 18y 11m 11d.
  - Neel Jani score 257 points.
