= A1 Team Australia =

Auto racing team in that competes in A1 Grand Prix series

- Australia
- Founded: 2005
- Seat holder(s): Alan Docking
- Team principal: Alan Jones
- Race driver(s): John Martin
- Car nickname: Jackeroo
- First race: 2005–06 Great Britain
- Rounds entered: 39 (78 races)
- Championships: 0
- Sprint race victories: 0
- Feature race victories: 0
- Pole positions: 0
- Fastest laps: 1
- Total points: 132
- 2008–09 position: 8th (36 pts)

A1 Team Australia was the Australian team of A1 Grand Prix, an international racing series.

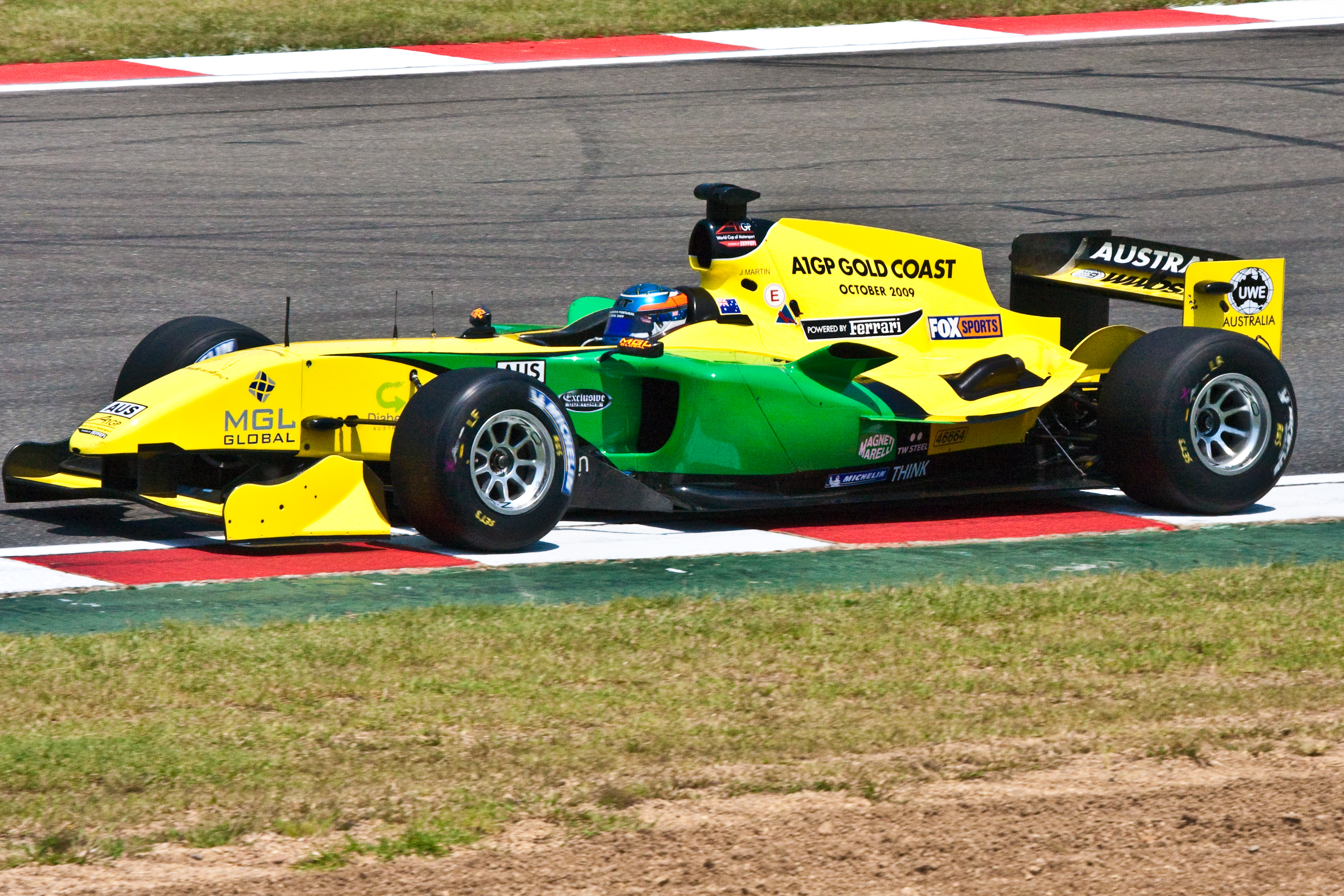
A1 Team Australia

== Management ==
The team chairman is former Formula One world champion Alan Jones, backed by general manager and former NASCAR driver Peter Nolan. The seat is owned by Formula One talent-spotter come principal engineer Alan Docking through his eponymous racing team organisation.

== History ==
Will Power was the team's driver for the opening round at Brands Hatch, scoring a fourth place in the Sprint Race and a second in the Main Race, beaten only by Nelson Piquet Jr. who dominated the weekend. Power amassed 16 points for these two results; however, he had already signed for Champ Car's Team Australia and made no further appearance in A1GP. His replacement was seat owner Jones' son Christian Jones, who did not fare so well; round two in Germany provided no points and a best finish of fourteenth place.

The uncompetitive Jones was replaced with Will Davison for round three in Portugal, and despite a qualifying performance of 18th place and a first-lap retirement in the Sprint Race, secured sixth place and five points in the Main Race. Davison was maintained for the home round at Eastern Creek Raceway, and again provided a sixth-place Main Race result. Davison consistently scored better in the Main Race in his drives, securing a one-point tenth place in the UAE round, although retiring from the main race in Durban.

Contract obligations again caused a driver change when Davison switched to V8 Supercars; Australia's fourth driver of the season was Marcus Marshall, who scored the team's first podium since the opening round with a third-place finish in Indonesia. He also moved into V8 Supercars however, and the driver's seat reverted to Christian Jones, who was again uncompetitive.

The seat for the last two rounds was awarded to Ryan Briscoe, who matched Power and Marshall's podium feat in the final round in China, with a main race third-place finish. In total, Australia's best results were a second place and two third places, for a total of 51 points and 13th place in the first-ever A1GP championship.

Although Team Australia managed to secure three podium finishes during the 2006-07 season, they still finished the championship in 13th position with 25 points.

Team Australia finished the 2007–08 season in 17th position, but did manage to score points in both the Sprint and Feature races of their home race.

In the 2008–09 season, Team Australia scored their first ever fastest lap in the final race of the season, however just narrowly missed out on beating New Zealand in the final standings, finishing 8th.

== Drivers ==
Name	Seasons	Rounds (Starts)	Titles	Wins	Sprint wins	Feature wins	2nd	3rd	Poles	Fastest Laps	Points
Ryan Briscoe	2005–06, 2006–07	5 (10 starts)						2			24
Will Davison	2005–06	5 (10 starts)									13
Ian Dyk	2006–07, 2007–08	7 (14 starts)						1			9
Christian Jones	2005–06	2 (4 starts)									0
Marcus Marshall	2005–06	1 (2 starts)						1			8
John Martin	2007–08, 2008–09	13 (26 starts)								1	54
Will Power	2005–06	1 (2 starts)					1				7
Karl Reindler	2006–07	5 (10 starts)						1			8

== Complete A1 Grand Prix results ==
(key), "spr" indicates the Sprint Race, "fea" indicates the Feature Race.

Year	Racing team	Chassis, Engine, Tyres	Drivers	1	2	3	4	5	6	7	8	9	10	11	12	13	14	15	16	17	18	19	20	21	22	Points	Rank
2005–06	Alan Docking Racing	Lola, Zytek, Cooper Avon		(United Kingdom) GBR		(Germany) GER		(Portugal) POR		(Australia) AUS		(Malaysia) MYS		(United Arab Emirates) UAE		(South Africa) RSA		(Indonesia) INA		(Mexico) MEX		(United States) USA		(China) CHN		51	13th
2005–06	Alan Docking Racing	Lola, Zytek, Cooper Avon		spr	fea	spr	fea	spr	fea	spr	fea	spr	fea	spr	fea	spr	fea	spr	fea	spr	fea	spr	fea	spr	fea	51	13th
2005–06	Alan Docking Racing	Lola, Zytek, Cooper Avon	Will Power	4	2																					51	13th
2005–06	Alan Docking Racing	Lola, Zytek, Cooper Avon	Christian Jones			15	14													16	Ret					51	13th
2005–06	Alan Docking Racing	Lola, Zytek, Cooper Avon	Will Davison					Ret	6	11	6	Ret	11	21	10	9	Ret									51	13th
2005–06	Alan Docking Racing	Lola, Zytek, Cooper Avon	Marcus Marshall															16	3							51	13th
2005–06	Alan Docking Racing	Lola, Zytek, Cooper Avon	Ryan Briscoe																			10	8	9	3	51	13th
2006–07	Alan Docking Racing	Lola; Zytek; Cooper Avon		(Netherlands) NED		(Czech Republic) CZE		(China) BEI		(Malaysia) MYS		(Indonesia) INA		(New Zealand) NZL		(Australia) AUS		(South Africa) RSA		(Mexico) MEX		(China) SHA		(United Kingdom) GBR		25	13th
2006–07	Alan Docking Racing	Lola; Zytek; Cooper Avon		spr	fea	spr	fea	spr	fea	spr	fea	spr	fea	spr	fea	spr	fea	spr	fea	spr	fea	spr	fea	spr	fea	25	13th
2006–07	Alan Docking Racing	Lola; Zytek; Cooper Avon	Ryan Briscoe	13	3					12	17	6	10													25	13th
2006–07	Alan Docking Racing	Lola; Zytek; Cooper Avon	Karl Reindler			15	16	12	3					14	13	14	14	16	Ret							25	13th
2006–07	Alan Docking Racing	Lola; Zytek; Cooper Avon	Ian Dyk																	3	8	16	Ret	14	Ret	25	13th
2007–08	Alan Docking Racing	Lola; Zytek; Cooper Avon		(Netherlands) NED		(Czech Republic) CZE		(Malaysia) MYS		(China) ZHU		(New Zealand) NZL		(Australia) AUS		(South Africa) RSA		(Mexico) MEX		(China) SHA		(United Kingdom) GBR				20	17th
2007–08	Alan Docking Racing	Lola; Zytek; Cooper Avon		spr	fea	spr	fea	spr	fea	spr	fea	spr	fea	spr	fea	spr	fea	spr	fea	spr	fea	spr	fea			20	17th
2007–08	Alan Docking Racing	Lola; Zytek; Cooper Avon	Ian Dyk	21	12	Ret	13	Ret	9	13	15															20	17th
2007–08	Alan Docking Racing	Lola; Zytek; Cooper Avon	John Martin									9	Ret	6	5	6	14	Ret	21	15	14	14	Ret			20	17th
2008–09	Alan Docking Racing	Ferrari, Michelin		(Netherlands) NLD		(China) CHN		(Malaysia) MYS		(New Zealand) NZL		(South Africa) RSA		(Portugal) POR		(United Kingdom) GBR										36	8th
2008–09	Alan Docking Racing	Ferrari, Michelin		spr	fea	spr	fea	spr	fea	spr	fea	spr	fea	spr	fea	spr	fea									36	8th
2008–09	Alan Docking Racing	Ferrari, Michelin	John Martin	12	4	11	6	8	4	Ret	4	12	13	10	12	7	8									36	8th
