= 2008 Taupo A1GP round =

2007-08 A1GP of New Zealand

Race Details
- Race 5 of 10 in the 2007-08 A1 Grand Prix season
- Date: 20 January 2008
- Location: Taupo Motorsport Park; Taupō, New Zealand
- Weather: Sunny and windy

Sprint race

Qualifying
- Pole: New Zealand (Jonny Reid)
- Time: 1'15.241

Podium
- 1st: New Zealand (Jonny Reid)
- 2nd: Germany (Christian Vietoris)
- 3rd: France (Loïc Duval)

Fastest Lap
- FL: Germany (Christian Vietoris)
- Time: 1'15.740, (Lap 9)

Feature race

Qualifying
- Pole: France (Loïc Duval)
- Time: 1'15.296

Podium
- 1st: Germany (Christian Vietoris)
- 2nd: Canada (Robert Wickens)
- 3rd: France (Loïc Duval)

Fastest Lap
- FL: Switzerland (Neel Jani)
- Time: 1'14.679, (Lap 45)

Official Classifications
- PDF Booklet

The 2007–08 A1 Grand Prix of Nations, New Zealand is an A1 Grand Prix race, which was held on 20 January 2008 at the Taupo Motorsport Park, New Zealand. This will be the fifth meeting in the 2007–08 A1 Grand Prix season.

== Pre-race ==
The Taupo circuit changes one of the circuit's corners. The turn 12 at the end of the longest straight will be much slower with a 90-degree left-hander. A1GP will inaugurate the new changes.

It was announced that the Taupo round switch to a 30 per cent biofuel mix. This environmental initiative is the first initiative to help reduce its environmental footprint in motorsport series. The new fuel is an ethanol based-product Hiperflo E30 sourced from sugar beet in Europe and produced by Petrochem Carless. The prediction are a CO_{2} emissions reduction by 21% per car.

A1 Team Indonesia and Performance Racing announce their new partnership. The racing team managed by Bobby Issazadhe provide now the technical and race services like it does with A1 Team Pakistan since 2006–07. Dave Luff is the new race engineer and Bagoes Hermanto became the new Team Principal.

To avoid what happen in the last race when safety car was out during feature race, a new light close to the entry of pit lane is introduced this weekend. When the lights are on, drivers can pit but it is not counted as one of the two mandatory stops. Pits are allowed for mechanical work or to be carried out.

== Qualifications ==
A1 Team France dominate the two practice sessions Friday afternoon and Saturday morning.

Sprint race qualifications
Pos	Team	Time	Gap
1	New Zealand	1'15.241	-
2	South Africa	1'15.522	+0.281
3	France	1'15.628	+0.387
4	Germany	1'15.724	+0.483
5	Netherlands	1'16.036	+0.795
6	(United States) USA	1'16.101	+0.860
7	(Republic of Ireland) Ireland	1'16.182	+0.941
8	Canada	1'16.201	+0.960
9	Malaysia	1'16.386	+1.145
10	Brazil	1'16.408	+1.167
11	Switzerland	1'16.423	+1.182
12	Italy	1'16.472	+1.231
13	(United Kingdom) Great Britain	1'16.731	+1.490
14	Portugal	1'17.147	+1.906
15	Australia	1'17.309	+2.068
16	China	1'17.340	+2.099
17	Lebanon	1'17.682	+2.441
18	Mexico	1'17.809	+2.568
19	Czech Republic	1'17.811	+2.570
20	India	1'17.961	+2.720
21	Indonesia	1'18.421	+3.180
22	Pakistan	1'18.635	+3.394

Main race qualifications
Pos	Team	Time	Gap
1	France	1'15.296	-
2	Germany	1'15.331	+0.035
3	Switzerland	1'15.476	+0.180
4	Canada	1'15.588	+0.292
5	New Zealand	1'15.618	+0.322
6	Portugal	1'15.620	+0.324
7	South Africa	1'15.651	+0.355
8	Netherlands	1'15.795	+0.499
9	(United Kingdom) Great Britain	1'15.895	+0.599
10	(United States) USA	1'15.898	+0.602
11	Brazil	1'16.024	+0.728
12	Australia	1'16.106	+0.810
13	(Republic of Ireland) Ireland	1'16.115	+0.819
14	Malaysia	1'16.198	+0.902
15	Mexico	1'16.313	+1.017
16	Italy	1'16.524	+1.228
17	Lebanon	1'16.556	+1.260
18	China	1'16.761	+1.465
19	India	1'16.791	+1.495
20	Czech Republic	1'17.526	+2.230
21	Pakistan	1'17.556	+2.260
22	Indonesia	1'18.106	+2.810

== Sprint race ==
For this sprint race, the time is sunny with a 19 °C but wind made the track dusty. At first turn, a big collision between Malaysia, Switzerland involve also Canadian and Brazilian drivers. Alex Yoong (Malaysia) and Neel Jani (Switzerland) are out of their own cars and renounce the race. Safety car is out until lap 4. Brazil and Canada have reach the tail of the field.
New Zealand lead the race ahead of Germany, South Africa and France. Pakistan passed Indonesia for 14th. In lap 6, turn 11, Robbie Kerr (Great Britain) attempt to passes Jonathan Summerton (USA) for seventh but the two cars collide. Great Britain has suspension damage and retires.
France passes South Africa for third at turn 12, lap 10. Next lap, Tomáš Enge (Czech Republic) crash into Chris Alajajian (Lebanon) who ran tenth and was able to score the first ever point for the Lebanese team. Robert Wickens is off in lap 13, turn 1. Jonny Reid (New Zealand) won the sprint race as home victory ahead of Germany, France, South Africa, Netherlands, Ireland, USA, Portugal, Australia and India. The extra point for fastest lap is scored by Christian Vietoris for Germany.

Pos	Team	Driver	Laps	Time	Grid	Points
1	New Zealand	Jonny Reid	14	19'25.408	1	15
2	Germany	Christian Vietoris	14	+3.192	4	12+1
3	France	Loïc Duval	14	+4.899	3	10
4	South Africa	Adrian Zaugg	14	+7.823	2	8
5	Netherlands	Jeroen Bleekemolen	14	+9.581	5	6
6	(Republic of Ireland) Ireland	Adam Carroll	14	+10.912	7	5
7	(United States) USA	Jonathan Summerton	14	+11.417	6	4
8	Portugal	João Urbano	14	+13.315	14	3
9	Australia	John Martin	14	+15.580	15	2
10	India	Narain Karthikeyan	14	+22.968	20	1
11	Pakistan	Adam Langley-Khan	14	+25.773	22	
12	Italy	Edoardo Piscopo	14	+26.048	12	
13	Brazil	Sérgio Jimenez	14	+26.541	10	
14	China	Cong Fu Cheng	14	+26.773	16	
15	Lebanon	Chris Alajajian	14	+29.483	17	
16	Indonesia	Satrio Hermanto	14	+31.107	21	
17	Mexico	David Garza Perez	14	+31.349	18	
Ret	Canada	Robert Wickens	11	Spun off	8	
Ret	Czech Republic	Tomáš Enge	10	Collision	19	
Ret	(United Kingdom) Great Britain	Robbie Kerr	9	Damage	13	
Ret	Malaysia	Alex Yoong	0	Collision	9	
Ret	Switzerland	Neel Jani	0	Collision	11	

== Main race ==
Weather is still sunny for the main race and the mandatory pit is announced between laps 34 to 42 (the first pit stop is always included between laps 8 and 16).
New Zealand make a bad start and loses several places meanwhile Switzerland take the lead but have jumped the start. In the first lap, Safety car is out because of an accident involving India at turn 7. Safety car is back in on lap 3 and Canada passes South Africa for sixth. Next lap, Chris Alajajian (Lebanon) and Edoardo Piscopo (Italy) collide and retire, Safety car is again in track. USA and Ireland take advantage to enter in pit to repair some aerodynamics damages. Switzerland receive a drive-through penalty for Neel Jani jump-start. Robbie Kerr (Great Britain) retire in garage for mechanical problems. Safety car is in on lap 7.
The first mandatory pit stops are now available and Germany passes France in pits. In lap 16, Switzerland break its front wing moving around the outside of Pakistan, and running into the grass. Next lap, USA makes its pit stop but the mandatory window is already closed. The current order is now Germany, France, Netherlands, Canada, Portugal, South Africa, New Zealand, Brazil, China and USA. Some laps later, in lap 22, oil is in the track in turn 7 and Indonesia, Australia and Netherlands spin off resulting Safety car back out for the third time on this race. Indonesia retire and Netherlands loses two places and is now fifth. Safety car is on lap 27. Jonny Reid (New Zealand) passes Adrian Zaugg (South Africa) on turn 11, lap 28 and press now Jeroen Bleekemolen (Netherlands). For overtaking behind the Safety car, Switzerland receive a second drive-through penalty. Adam Carroll (Ireland) take the tenth after Jonathan Summerton (USA) runs wide in lap 34. Same lap, the second window for mandatory stops is open.
Portugal is given a drive-through penalty for crossing the white line on entering the pit lane. On lap 39, Brazil passes South Africa for seventh. After mandatory pit stop, Germany lead Canada, France, New Zealand, Ireland, Brazil, South Africa, China, USA and Netherlands. Malaysia and Pakistan collide in lap 41, turn 12. Alex Yoong (Malaysia) retire in pits. In lap 43, Cong Fu Cheng (China) spin off and stop its race.
In lap 49, Switzerland take the fastest lap of the race and the bonus point. Germany win front of Canada, only 1.180 seconds behind, followed by France, New Zealand, Ireland, Brazil, South Africa, USA, Netherlands, Mexico and Pakistan in eleventh.

USA has been penalised 70 seconds for making its mandatory pit stop outside of the proper window. The team loses is 8th final positions and was classified 14th. Therefore, Pakistan score its first point of the season.

Pos	Team	Driver	Laps	Time	Points
1	Germany	Christian Vietoris	50	1:10'40.168	15
2	Canada	Robert Wickens	50	+1.180	12
3	France	Loïc Duval	50	+2.025	10
4	New Zealand	Jonny Reid	50	+3.031	8
5	(Republic of Ireland) Ireland	Adam Carroll	50	+4.088	6
6	Brazil	Sérgio Jimenez	50	+5.117	5
7	South Africa	Adrian Zaugg	50	+10.107	4
8	Netherlands	Jeroen Bleekemolen	50	+11.175	3
9	Mexico	David Garza Perez	50	+19.478	2
10	Pakistan	Adam Langley-Khan	50	+25.559	1
11	Czech Republic	Tomáš Enge	50	+26.506	
12	Portugal	João Urbano	50	+29.848	
13	Switzerland	Neel Jani	50	+34.451	+1
14	(United States) USA	Jonathan Summerton	49	+1 lap	
Ret	China	Cong Fu Cheng	43	Spun off	
Ret	Malaysia	Alex Yoong	38	Colision	
Ret	Australia	John Martin	37	+13 laps	
Ret	Indonesia	Satrio Hermanto	21	Spun off	
Ret	(United Kingdom) Great Britain	Robbie Kerr	4	Mechanical	
Ret	Italy	Edoardo Piscopo	3	Collision	
Ret	Lebanon	Chris Alajajian	3	Collision	
Ret	India	Narain Karthikeyan	1	Accident	

== After race ==
Neel Jani announce he's available for the rest of the season for Switzerland. Its priority is won the A1GP championship and don't want to return in Champ Car World Series this year.

Tony Teixeira, A1GP chairman, congratulate Alex Yoong with a cake to mark his 50th race in the series.

== Notes ==
- It was the 27th race weekend (54 starts).
- It was the second venue in Taupo Motorsport Park, and second in New Zealand.
- It was the first race for John Martin.
- It was the first race weekend for Tom Dillmann, Frederico Duarte, Clemente Faria, Brendon Hartley, James Winslow.
- Records :
  - Alex Yoong participate on 26 races (50 starts). He start consecutively 45 races.
  - Neel Jani won 219 points.
  - Christian Vietoris is the youngest race winner at 18 years, 9 months and 19 days.
  - Lebanon participate on 27 rounds (54 starts) without won points since their first Grand Prix.
  - Germany won with 3 different drivers (Michael Ammermüller, Nico Hülkenberg and Christian Vietoris).
