= A1 Team Portugal =

- Portugal
- Founded: 2005; 20 years ago
- Seat holder(s): Luís Figo; Carlos Queiroz
- Team principal: Luís Vicente
- Race driver(s): Filipe Albuquerque
- First race: 2005–06 Great Britain
- Rounds entered: 32
- Championships: 0
- Sprint race victories: 0
- Feature race victories: 1
- Pole positions: 0
- Fastest laps: 2
- Total points: 227
- 2008–09 position: 3rd (92 pts)

A1 Team Portugal was the Portuguese team for A1 Grand Prix, an international racing series.

== Management ==
The A1 Team Portugal team owners were Luís Figo and Carlos Queiroz. The team's operations were run by CEO Luís Vicente, manager of the Fundação Luís Figo.

== History ==
=== 2008–09 season ===
Driver: Filipe Albuquerque

Filipe Albuquerque was the primary driver for A1 Team Portugal through to the end of the 2009–10 season. He scored his first A1GP victory in the feature race in China. With four additional podium finishes and only two races without points (both during the same event), Albuquerque went on to finish as 3rd in the 2008–09 championship, with 92 points.

=== 2007–08 season ===
Drivers: Filipe Albuquerque, João Urbano

After a dismal start to the season, scoring only five points in the first six races, Team Portugal came alive after Filipe Albuquerque became lead driver. The team scored three podiums, and finished 11th in the championship.

=== 2006–07 season ===
Drivers: Álvaro Parente, João Urbano

Team Portugal only competed in four rounds of the 2006–07 season, starting with the Durban race. They scored twice, and finished in 17th place in the championship.

=== 2005–06 season ===
Drivers: César Campaniço, Álvaro Parente

In the inaugural season, Team Portugal took 3 podiums en route to 9th in the championship.

== FPAK A1GP Portugal Junior Team ==
The Federação Portuguesa de Automobilismo e Karting (FPKA) and the A1 Team Portugal create in November 2007 the FPAK A1GP Portugal Junior Team to encourage Portuguese drivers into A1GP. This project, give to Portuguese Cup and Open Racing Series in Portugal drivers, the opportunities to take part in the rookie sessions or practice events. The first driver to benefit from this Junior Team is Gonçalo Araújo will take part in the rookie session at Zuhai during the fourth round of the 2007–08 season.
Except Gonçalo Araújo, Bruno Serra and Frederico Duarte will take part of Junior Team in 2007–08. This season, its Armando Parente, António Félix da Costa, Gonçalo Araújo and Bruno Serra.

== Drivers ==
Name	Seasons	Races (Starts)	A1GP Title	Wins	Sprint wins	Main wins	2nd	3rd	Poles	Fastest Laps	Points
Filipe Albuquerque	2007–08, 2008–09	11 (22)		1		1	4	4		2	146
João Urbano	2006–07, 2007–08	7 (14)									5
Álvaro Parente	2005–06, 2006–07	13 (26)					1	2			76
César Campaniço	2005–06	1 (2)									0

== Complete A1 Grand Prix results ==
(key), "spr" indicates the Sprint Race, "fea" indicates the Feature Race.

Year	Racing team	Chassis, Engine, Tyres	Drivers	1	2	3	4	5	6	7	8	9	10	11	12	13	14	15	16	17	18	19	20	21	22	Points	Rank
2005–06	Carlin Motorsport	Lola, Zytek, Cooper Avon		(United Kingdom) GBR		(Germany) GER		(Portugal) PRT		(Australia) AUS		(Malaysia) MYS		(United Arab Emirates) UAE		(South Africa) RSA		(Indonesia) INA		(Mexico) MEX		(United States) USA		(China) CHN		66	9th
2005–06	Carlin Motorsport	Lola, Zytek, Cooper Avon		spr	fea	spr	fea	spr	fea	spr	fea	spr	fea	spr	fea	spr	fea	spr	fea	spr	fea	spr	fea	spr	fea	66	9th
2005–06	Carlin Motorsport	Lola, Zytek, Cooper Avon	Álvaro Parente	8	Ret	Ret	11	6	5	2	7	9	18	8	4	8	3	19	Ret	Ret	10	3	4			66	9th
2005–06	Carlin Motorsport	Lola, Zytek, Cooper Avon	César Campaniço																					13	12	66	9th
2006–07	Team Astromega	Lola, Zytek, Cooper Avon		(Netherlands) NED		(Czech Republic) CZE		(China) BEI		(Malaysia) MYS		(Indonesia) INA		(New Zealand) NZL		(Australia) AUS		(South Africa) RSA		(Mexico) MEX		(China) SHA		(United Kingdom) GBR		10	17th
2006–07	Team Astromega	Lola, Zytek, Cooper Avon		spr	fea	spr	fea	spr	fea	spr	fea	spr	fea	spr	fea	spr	fea	spr	fea	spr	fea	spr	fea	spr	fea	10	17th
2006–07	Team Astromega	Lola, Zytek, Cooper Avon	Álvaro Parente															8	5	14	7			11	11	10	17th
2006–07	Team Astromega	Lola, Zytek, Cooper Avon	João Urbano																			19	13			10	17th
2007–08	A1 Team Portugal	Lola, Zytek, Cooper Avon		(Netherlands) NED		(Czech Republic) CZE		(Malaysia) MYS		(China) ZHU		(New Zealand) NZL		(Australia) AUS		(South Africa) RSA		(Mexico) MEX		(China) SHA		(United Kingdom) GBR				59	11th
2007–08	A1 Team Portugal	Lola, Zytek, Cooper Avon		spr	fea	spr	fea	spr	fea	spr	fea	spr	fea	spr	fea	spr	fea	spr	fea	spr	fea	spr	fea			59	11th
2007–08	A1 Team Portugal	Lola, Zytek, Cooper Avon	João Urbano	11	Ret	9	18	13	Ret	19	12	8	12	12	16											59	11th
2007–08	A1 Team Portugal	Lola, Zytek, Cooper Avon	Filipe Albuquerque													7	3	6	7	3	2	6	7			59	11th
2008–09	Boer Racing Services	Ferrari, Ferrari, Michelin		(Netherlands) NED		(China) CHN		(Malaysia) MYS		(New Zealand) NZL		(South Africa) RSA		(Portugal) POR		(United Kingdom) GBR										92	3rd
2008–09	Boer Racing Services	Ferrari, Ferrari, Michelin		spr	fea	spr	fea	spr	fea	spr	fea	spr	fea	spr	fea	spr	fea									92	3rd
2008–09	Boer Racing Services	Ferrari, Ferrari, Michelin	Filipe Albuquerque	9	Ret	6	1	4	2	6	3	2	5	3	2	5	5									92	3rd
