= Durban Street Circuit =

Motorsport track in Durban, South Africa

- Grand Prix Circuit (2006–2008)
- Location: Durban, South Africa
- Coordinates: 29°50′17.96″S 31°2′3.77″E
- Capacity: 22,000
- Opened: 27 January 2006; 20 years ago
- Closed: 24 February 2008; 18 years ago
- Major events: A1 Grand Prix (2006–2008)

Grand Prix Circuit (2006–2008)
- Length: 3.283 km (2.040 mi)
- Race lap record: 1:18.178 ( (Brazil) Nelson Piquet Jr., Lola A1GP, 2006, A1 GP)

The Durban Street Circuit was a 3.283 km (2.040 mi) temporary street circuit located in Durban, South Africa which was 300 m (330 yd) from Durban's North Beach and 800 m (870 yd) from Durban's CBD. The circuit and infrastructure was designed by D3 Motorsport Development which also oversaw the construction of the circuit each year. It was used for the A1 Grand Prix from 2006 to 2008. The A1 Grand Prix race held on this circuit was the first international open-wheel automobile race held in the country since the 1993 South African Grand Prix.

== History ==
The 2006 event attracted more than 105,000 spectators. The event was voted the best round of the 2005–06 A1 Grand Prix season. It was also one of the biggest sports events in Durban's history. Rumors claimed that a future South African Formula One Grand Prix would possibly be raced in the street circuit. However, there are no official sources confirmed that any future South African Grand Prix in the Durban Streets. It was announced on 21 July 2008 that Kyalami would host the South African round of the 2008–09 A1 Grand Prix season instead of the Durban street circuit.

In 2010 the Durban street circuit was to host a round of the new FIA GT1 World Championship. However, following delays in completing alterations to the Durban street circuit due to construction for the 2010 FIFA World Cup, the South African round was postponed until 2011. A Spanish event at the brand new Circuito de Navarra was proposed as a replacement for Durban on the calendar, and was confirmed at the FIA World Motor Sport Council meeting of 24 October.

== The circuit ==
The 3.283 km (2.040 mi) temporary street circuit incorporated long fast straights along NMR Ave, and Suncoast Boulevard, a slow hairpin on Snell Parade and three challenging chicanes. The street circuit and event infrastructure was designed and project managed by D3 Motorsport Development, famous for the Surfers Paradise street circuit in Australia.
