= A1 Team Netherlands =

Dutch Formula One Racing Team

- Netherlands
- Founded: 2005
- Seat holder(s): Jan Lammers
- Team principal: -
- Race driver(s): Jeroen Bleekemolen; Robert Doornbos; Jos Verstappen; Renger van der Zande
- Car nickname: -
- First race: 2005–06 Great Britain
- Rounds entered: 39 (77 starts)
- Championships: 0
- Sprint race victories: 3
- Feature race victories: 1
- Pole positions: 5
- Fastest laps: 1
- Total points: 294
- 2008-09 position: 4th (75 pts)

A1 Team Netherlands was the Dutch team of A1 Grand Prix, an international racing series.

== Management ==
A1 Team Netherlands' owner was former Formula One driver and Le Mans winner Jan Lammers. The team was managed by Lammers's racing team Racing for Holland, notable for their participation in the 24 hours of Le Mans and FIA sportscars series.

== History ==
The 2005-06 season had a difficult start for Team Netherlands. In the first two sprint races the car was hit in the first turn on both the Brands Hatch and EuroSpeedway circuits. Despite these setbacks, Jos Verstappen showed impressive overtaking action in the main races moving from the back of the grid to the seventh position. The season continued with average results, with 4th up to 19th positions as end results.

The street circuit of Durban, South Africa brought the first victory for A1 Team Netherlands as in the last turn of the main race, Jos Verstappen managed to take the lead from the Swiss car. A similar manoeuvre that failed during the sprint race forced Verstappen to start from the 16th place on the grid.

In 2006-07 Team Netherlands finished 5th in the championship, with one victory.

In 2007-08 Team Netherlands finished 7th in the championship, with 2 podiums.

For the 2008-09 season Jeroen Bleekemolen returned as a driver, alongside A1GP rookie Robert Doornbos. Both drivers alternated races, starting with Bleekemolen at Zandvoort. Team Netherlands finished 4th in the championship, with both drivers having scored one victory in a sprint race.

== Drivers ==
Name	Seasons	Rounds (Starts)	Titles	Wins	Sprint wins	Feature wins	2nd	3rd	Poles	Fastest Laps	Points
Jeroen Bleekemolen	2006-07, 2007-08, 2008-09	24 (47 starts)		2	2		2	1	4		187 (Note: This includes the 6 points scored during the 2008–09 Malaysian Grand Prix, where the team scored its worst result of the 2008–09 season and the points of which were therefore later deducted.)
Robert Doornbos	2008-09	3 (5 starts)		1	1		1	1	1	1	31
Renger van der Zande	2006-07	2 (3 starts)									7
Jos Verstappen	2005-06	11 (22 starts)		1		1	1				69

== Complete A1 Grand Prix results ==
(key), "spr" indicates the Sprint Race, "fea" indicates the Feature Race.(results in bold indicate pole position; results in italics indicate fastest lap)

Year	Racing team	Chassis, Engine, Tyres	Drivers	1	2	3	4	5	6	7	8	9	10	11	12	13	14	15	16	17	18	19	20	21	22	Points	Rank
2005–06	Racing for Holland	Lola, Zytek, Cooper Avon		(United Kingdom) GBR		(Germany) GER		(Portugal) POR		(Australia) AUS		(Malaysia) MYS		(United Arab Emirates) UAE		(South Africa) RSA		(Indonesia) INA		(Mexico) MEX		(United States) USA		(China) CHN		69	7th
2005–06	Racing for Holland	Lola, Zytek, Cooper Avon		spr	fea	spr	fea	spr	fea	spr	fea	spr	fea	spr	fea	spr	fea	spr	fea	spr	fea	spr	fea	spr	fea	69	7th
2005–06	Racing for Holland	Lola, Zytek, Cooper Avon	Jos Verstappen	Ret	7	Ret	7	4	Ret	7	4	5	16	11	9	16	1	7	6	4	2	14	Ret	Ret	17	69	7th
2006–07	Racing for Holland	Lola, Zytek, Cooper Avon		(Netherlands) NED		(Czech Republic) CZE		(China) BEI		(Malaysia) MYS		(Indonesia) INA		(New Zealand) NZL		(Australia) AUS		(South Africa) RSA		(Mexico) MEX		(China) SHA		(United Kingdom) GBR		57	5th
2006–07	Racing for Holland	Lola, Zytek, Cooper Avon		spr	fea	spr	fea	spr	fea	spr	fea	spr	fea	spr	fea	spr	fea	spr	fea	spr	fea	spr	fea	spr	fea	57	5th
2006–07	Racing for Holland	Lola, Zytek, Cooper Avon	Jeroen Bleekemolen	9	4	11	9	**1**	Ret	7	9	13	DSQ	4	5	5	4	4	6		17			6	5	57	5th
2006–07	Racing for Holland	Lola, Zytek, Cooper Avon	Renger van der Zande																	9		9	4			57	5th
2007–08	Racing for Holland	Lola, Zytek, Cooper Avon		(Netherlands) NED		(Czech Republic) CZE		(Malaysia) MYS		(China) ZHU		(New Zealand) NZL		(Australia) AUS		(South Africa) RSA		(Mexico) MEX		(China) SHA		(United Kingdom) GBR				87	7th
2007–08	Racing for Holland	Lola, Zytek, Cooper Avon		spr	fea	spr	fea	spr	fea	spr	fea	spr	fea	spr	fea	spr	fea	spr	fea	spr	fea	spr	fea			87	7th
2007–08	Racing for Holland	Lola, Zytek, Cooper Avon	Jeroen Bleekemolen	3	8	5	**2**	18	4	9	Ret	5	8	9	8	5	4	8	4	17	18	9	6			87	7th
2008–09	Racing for Holland	Ferrari, Ferrari, Michelin		(Netherlands) NED		(China) CHN		(Malaysia) MYS		(New Zealand) NZL		(South Africa) RSA		(Portugal) POR		(United Kingdom) GBR										75	4th
2008–09	Racing for Holland	Ferrari, Ferrari, Michelin		spr	fea	spr	fea	spr	fea	spr	fea	spr	fea	spr	fea	spr	fea									75	4th
2008–09	Racing for Holland	Ferrari, Ferrari, Michelin	Jeroen Bleekemolen	**4**	5			6	8			**1**	4			6	2									75	4th
2008–09	Racing for Holland	Ferrari, Ferrari, Michelin	Robert Doornbos			2	16			3	5			1	**DNS**											75	4th
