= 2006 Sepang A1GP round =

2006-07 A1GP of Malaysia

Race Details
- Race 4 of 11 in the 2006-07 A1 Grand Prix season
- Date: November 26, 2006
- Location: Sepang International Circuit; Sepang, Malaysia
- Weather: Dry (Sprint) Wet (Feature)

Qualifying
- Pole: Switzerland (Neel Jani)
- Time: 3:43.014 (, )

Sprint Race
- 1st: Switzerland (Neel Jani)
- 2nd: Germany (Nico Hülkenberg)
- 3rd: New Zealand (Jonny Reid)

Main Race
- 1st: Germany (Nico Hülkenberg)
- 2nd: Great Britain (Robbie Kerr)
- 3rd: France (Nicolas Lapierre)

Fast Lap
- FL: [[A1 Team |]] ()
- Time: , (Lap of Race)

Official Classifications
- [ Prac1-A] ·[ Prac1-B] ·[ Prac2] ·[ Prac3] ·[ Qual] ·[ SRace] ·[ MRace]

Layout of the Sepang International Circuit

The 2006–07 A1 Grand Prix of Nations, Malaysia is an A1 Grand Prix race, held on November 26, 2006, at Sepang International Circuit, Malaysia. This was the fourth race in the 2006-07 A1 Grand Prix season and the second meeting held at the circuit.

== Report ==
=== Main race ===
In wet conditions, Team Germany driver Nico Hülkenberg dominated the field and won by over 40 seconds.

== Results ==
=== Qualification ===
Qualification took place on Saturday, November 25, 2006

| Pos | Team | Driver | Q1 Time | Q2 Time | Q3 Time | Q4 Time | Aggregate | Gap |
|---|---|---|---|---|---|---|---|---|
| 1 | Switzerland | Neel Jani | 1'51.508 | 1'51.506 | 1'52.746 | -- | 3'43.014 | -- |
| 2 | New Zealand | Jonny Reid | 1'51.872 | 1'51.433 | 1'53.485 | -- | 3'43.305 | 0.291 |
| 3 | Germany | Nico Hülkenberg | 1'51.836* | 1'51.545 | 1'52.017 | 1'52.538 | 3'43.562 | 0.548 |
| 4 | (United Kingdom) Great Britain | Robbie Kerr | 1'52.016 | 1'51.925 | 1'52.764 | 1'53.622 | 3:43.941 | 0.927 |
| 5 | China | Congfu Cheng | 1'51.948 | 1'51.936 | 1'53.333 | 1'53.206 | 3'44.884 | 1.870 |
| 6 | Netherlands | Jeroen Bleekemolen | 1'52.534 | 1'52.398 | 1'53.124 | 1'53.889 | 3'44.932 | 1.918 |
| 7 | Malaysia | Alex Yoong | 1'52.648 | 1'53.151 | 1'52.471 | 1'52.597 | 3'45.068 | 2.054 |
| ~~9~~ → 8 | Canada | Sean McIntosh | 1'53.142 | 1'52.210 | 1'53.424 | 1'53.352 | 3'45.352 | 2.338 |
| ~~10~~ → 9 | France | Nicolas Lapierre | 1'52.593 | 1'52.817 | 1'53.062 | 1'53.657 | 3'45.410 | 2.396 |
| ~~11~~ → 10 | (United States) USA | Philip Giebler | 1'53.322 | 1'54.357 | 1'53.894 | 1'52.521 | 3'45.843 | 2.829 |
| ~~8~~ → 11 | South Africa | Adrian Zaugg | 1'52.778 | 1'52.460** | 1'53.849 | 1'53.090 | 3'45.868 | 0.544 |
| 12 | Mexico | Salvador Durán | 1'53.512 | 1'52.728 | 1'54.042 | 1'53.427 | 3'46.155 | 3.151 |
| 13 | (Republic of Ireland) Ireland | Michael Devaney | -- | 1'52.894 | 1'53.576 | 1'53.326 | 3'46.220 | 3.206 |
| 14 | Czech Republic | Tomáš Enge | 1'53.016 | 1'53.391 | 1'53.788 | 1'54.109 | 3'46.407 | 3.393 |
| 15 | Brazil | Raphael Matos | 1'53.402 | 1'53.733 | 1'53.343 | 1'53.457 | 3'46.745 | 3.731 |
| 16 | Singapore | Christian Murchison | 1'54.208 | -- | 1'53.426 | 1'53.768 | 3'47.194 | 4.180 |
| 17 | Australia | Ryan Briscoe | 1'54.545 | 1'53.166 | -- | 1'54.908 | 3'47.711 | 4.697 |
| ~~19~~ → 18 | India | Armaan Ebrahim | 1:54.060 | 1'54.328 | 1'54.575 | 1'54.899 | 3'48.388 | 5.384 |
| ~~18~~ → 19 | Indonesia | Ananda Mikola | 1'54.407 | 1'53.989*** | 1'55.101 | 1'54.260 | 3'48.667 | 5.653 |
| 20 | Italy | Enrico Toccacelo | 1'54.565 | 1'54.610 | 1'54.432 | 1'54.740 | 3'49.175 | 6.171 |
| 21 | Lebanon | Khalil Beschir | 1'55.710 | 1'54.527 | 1'55.610 | -- | 3'50.137 | 7.123 |
| 22 | Pakistan | Nur B. Ali | 2'00.492 | 1'58.589 | 2'00.783 | 1'59.304 | 3'57.893 | 14.879 |

*After an incident in Qualifying segment 1, in which Germany's Nico Hülkenberg was judged to have caused an avoidable collision with Ireland's Michael Devaney, Hülkenberg was deducted his fastest time, though his had no effect on his Sprint race starting grid position.

**After an incident in Qualifying segment 2, in which South Africa's Adrian Zaugg was judged to have blocked USA driver Philip Giebler during his fast lap, Zaugg was deducted his fastest time, resulting in him moving from 8th to 11th on the Sprint race starting grid.

***After an incident in Qualifying segment 2, in which Indonesia's Ananda Mikola was judged to have blocked Italy's Enrico Toccacelo during his fast lap, Mikola was deducted his fastest time, resulting in him moving from 18th to 19th on the Sprint race starting grid.

=== Sprint Race Results ===
The Sprint race took place on Sunday, November 26, 2006

| Pos | Team | Driver | Time | Laps | Points |
|---|---|---|---|---|---|
| 1 | Switzerland | Neel Jani | 10 | 19'06.289 | 6 |
| 2 | Germany | Nico Hülkenberg | 10 | + 1.209 | 5 |
| 3 | New Zealand | Jonny Reid | 10 | + 3.601 | 4 |
| 4 | Malaysia | Alex Yoong | 10 | + 11.826 | 3 |
| 5 | (United Kingdom) Great Britain | Robbie Kerr | 10 | + 12.858 | 2 |
| 6 | France | Nicolas Lapierre | 10 | + 13.731 | 1 |
| 7 | Netherlands | Jeroen Bleekemolen | 10 | + 16.097 | |
| 8 | Canada | Sean McIntosh | 10 | + 17.358 | |
| 9 | (United States) USA | Philip Giebler | 10 | + 18.292 | |
| 10 | China | Congfu Cheng | 10 | + 21.207 | |
| 11 | Mexico | Salvador Durán | 10 | + 22.572 | |
| 12 | Australia | Ryan Briscoe | 10 | + 23.628 | |
| 13 | South Africa | Adrian Zaugg | 10 | + 24.686 | |
| 14 | (Republic of Ireland) Ireland | Michael Devaney | 10 | + 25.433 | |
| 15 | Singapore | Christian Murchison | 10 | + 33.516 | |
| 16 | India | Armaan Ebrahim | 10 | + 35.184 | |
| 17 | Lebanon | Khalil Beschir | 10 | + 45.218 | |
| 18 | Pakistan | Nur B. Ali | 10 | + 1'35.573 | |
| 19 | Brazil | Raphael Matos | 10 | + 1'39.417 | |
| DNF | Indonesia | Ananda Mikola | 1 | + 9 laps | |
| DNF | Czech Republic | Tomáš Enge | 1 | + 9 laps | |
| DNF | Italy | Enrico Toccacelo | 1 | + 9 laps | |

=== Feature Race Results ===
The Feature race took place on Sunday, November 26, 2006

| Pos | Team | Driver | Time | Laps | Points |
|---|---|---|---|---|---|
| 1 | Germany | Nico Hülkenberg | 28 | 1:10'54.943 | 10 |
| 2 | (United Kingdom) Great Britain | Robbie Kerr | 28 | + 42.849 | 9 |
| 3 | France | Nicolas Lapierre | 28 | + 46.621 | 8 |
| 4 | Switzerland | Neel Jani | 28 | + 1'02.321 | 7 |
| 5 | Canada | Sean McIntosh | 28 | + 1'07.609 | 6 |
| 6 | (United States) USA | Philip Giebler | 28 | + 1'08.592 | 5 |
| 7 | Malaysia | Alex Yoong | 28 | + 1'13.059 | 4 |
| 8 | New Zealand | Jonny Reid | 28 | + 1'21.332 | 3 |
| 9 | Netherlands | Jeroen Bleekemolen | 28 | + 1'33.415 | 2 |
| 10 | (Republic of Ireland) Ireland | Michael Devaney | 28 | + 1'36.491 | 1 |
| 11 | Singapore | Christian Murchison | 28 | + 1'38.295 | |
| 12 | South Africa | Adrian Zaugg | 28 | + 1'46.268 | |
| 13 | Italy | Enrico Toccacelo | 28 | + 1'46.472 | |
| 14 | Czech Republic | Tomáš Enge | 28 | + 1'47.778 | |
| 15 | Indonesia | Ananda Mikola | 28 | + 1'56.765 | |
| 16 | China | Congfu Cheng | 28 | + 2'01.301 | |
| 17 | Australia | Ryan Briscoe | 28 | + 2'19.799 | |
| 18 | Brazil | Raphael Matos | 27 | + 1 lap | |
| 19 | India | Armaan Ebrahim | 27 | + 1 lap | |
| 20 | Lebanon | Khalil Beschir | 27 | + 1 lap | |
| 21 | Pakistan | Nur B. Ali | 26 | + 2 laps | |
| DNF | Mexico | Salvador Durán | 11 | + 17 laps | |

=== Total Points ===
- Fastest Lap:
