= A1 Team Ireland =

Irish team of A1 Grand Prix

- Ireland
- Founded: 2005
- Seat holder(s): Teddy Yip Jr. John P Hynes; David Kennedy (racing driver); Mark Gallagher
- Team principal: Mark Gallagher
- Race driver(s): Adam Carroll; Niall Quinn; Michael Devaney; Richard Lyons; Ralph Firman
- First race: 2005-06 Great Britain
- Rounds entered: 39 (78 starts)
- Championships: 1
- Sprint race victories: 3
- Feature race victories: 3
- Pole positions: 6
- Fastest laps: 9
- Total points: 282
- 2008-09 position: 1st (112 pts)

A1 Team Ireland was the Irish team of A1 Grand Prix, an international racing series. The team were the A1 Grand Prix champions for the fourth season, 2008-09.

== The team ==
Founded by Mark Kershaw and Mark Gallagher in 2005, the team was owned and run by Status Grand Prix. In 2008, Mark Kershaw sold his interest in the team. The new the seat holders were Mark Gallagher, Teddy Yip Jr., John P. Hynes and David Kennedy.

== History ==
The inaugural team's 2005-06 car was presented to the public on 15 September 2005. For that debut season, Ralph Firman was the team's principal driver, scoring the team its first podium in Portugal to finish 8th overall in the championship. The series organisers awarded the team for being the best presented team, the first of three consecutive wins for A1 Team Ireland.

In its second season, the team did not perform quite as well. The best result achieved that season was fifth place in the Feature race at Shanghai, and the team finished in 19th place.

For the 2007–08 season, Ralph Firman secured some points at the season opener in Zandvoort before Adam Carroll took over as the A1 Team Ireland principal driver. He went on to get four podium finishes in his debut season and record the team's first Feature Race victory in Mexico City. After winning Ireland's Dunlop Racing Driver of the Year, Niall Quinn joined the team as the Rookie Driver. A1 Team Ireland ended Season Three in 6th position, helping them to win the 'Most Improved Team' award at the 2007/08 Gala Awards. A1 Team Ireland have won the A1GP award for best presented team in all three seasons alongside winning the 'Most Appealing Livery' trophy in Season Two.

In the 2008–09 season, Adam Carroll returned as lead driver and Niall Quinn as rookie driver. A1 Team Ireland were championship contenders most of the season, and won the championship at the last event of the season at Brands Hatch.

== Drivers ==
Name	Seasons	Rounds (Starts)	Titles	Wins	Sprint wins	Feature wins	2nd	3rd	Poles	Fastest Laps	Points
Adam Carroll	2007-08, 2008-09	16 (32 starts)	1	6	3	3	3	3	6	6	198
Michael Devaney	2005-06, 2006-07	7 (14 starts)									16
Ralph Firman	2005-06, 2007-08	9 (18 starts)						1		3	61
Richard Lyons	2006-07	7 (14 starts)									7

== Complete A1 Grand Prix results ==
(key), "spr" indicates the Sprint Race, "fea" indicates the Feature Race.

Year	Racing team	Chassis, Engine, Tyres	Drivers	1	2	3	4	5	6	7	8	9	10	11	12	13	14	15	16	17	18	19	20	21	22	Points	Rank
2005–06	Status Grand Prix	Lola, Zytek, Cooper Avon		(United Kingdom) GBR		(Germany) GER		(Portugal) POR		(Australia) AUS		(Malaysia) MYS		(United Arab Emirates) UAE		(South Africa) RSA		(Indonesia) INA		(Mexico) MEX		(United States) USA		(China) CHN		68	8th
2005–06	Status Grand Prix	Lola, Zytek, Cooper Avon		spr	fea	spr	fea	spr	fea	spr	fea	spr	fea	spr	fea	spr	fea	spr	fea	spr	fea	spr	fea	spr	fea	68	8th
2005–06	Status Grand Prix	Lola, Zytek, Cooper Avon	Michael Devaney	10	Ret					4	14													4	Ret	68	8th
2005–06	Status Grand Prix	Lola, Zytek, Cooper Avon	Ralph Firman			9	6	19	3			7	9	4	Ret	4	Ret	6	Ret	Ret	Ret	5	6			68	8th
2006–07	Status Grand Prix	Lola; Zytek; Cooper Avon		(Netherlands) NED		(Czech Republic) CZE		(China) BEI		(Malaysia) MYS		(Indonesia) INA		(New Zealand) NZL		(Australia) AUS		(South Africa) RSA		(Mexico) MEX		(China) SHA		(United Kingdom) GBR		8	19th
2006–07	Status Grand Prix	Lola; Zytek; Cooper Avon		spr	fea	spr	fea	spr	fea	spr	fea	spr	fea	spr	fea	spr	fea	spr	fea	spr	fea	spr	fea	spr	fea	8	19th
2006–07	Status Grand Prix	Lola; Zytek; Cooper Avon	Michael Devaney	15	14	13	13	20	Ret	14	10															8	19th
2006–07	Status Grand Prix	Lola; Zytek; Cooper Avon	Richard Lyons									17	12	Ret	19	10	Ret	6	Ret	Ret	16	12	5	8	DSQ	8	19th
2007–08	Status Grand Prix	Lola; Zytek; Cooper Avon		(Netherlands) NED		(Czech Republic) CZE		(Malaysia) MYS		(China) ZHU		(New Zealand) NZL		(Australia) AUS		(South Africa) RSA		(Mexico) MEX		(China) SHA		(United Kingdom) GBR				94	6th
2007–08	Status Grand Prix	Lola; Zytek; Cooper Avon		spr	fea	spr	fea	spr	fea	spr	fea	spr	fea	spr	fea	spr	fea	spr	fea	spr	fea	spr	fea			94	6th
2007–08	Status Grand Prix	Lola; Zytek; Cooper Avon	Ralph Firman	8	6																					94	6th
2007–08	Status Grand Prix	Lola; Zytek; Cooper Avon	Adam Carroll			3	6	7	7	4	16	6	5	15	13	15	Ret	4	1	11	3	3	13			94	6th
2008–09	Status Grand Prix	Ferrari, Ferrari, Michelin		(Netherlands) NED		(China) CHN		(Malaysia) MYS		(New Zealand) NZL		(South Africa) RSA		(Portugal) POR		(United Kingdom) GBR										112	1st
2008–09	Status Grand Prix	Ferrari, Ferrari, Michelin		spr	fea	spr	fea	spr	fea	spr	fea	spr	fea	spr	fea	spr	fea									112	1st
2008–09	Status Grand Prix	Ferrari, Ferrari, Michelin	Adam Carroll	Ret	Ret	1	2	5	1	1	2	4	Ret	2	5	1	1									112	1st

== Notes ==
Sporting positions
Preceded by Switzerland	A1 Grand Prix Champion; 2008–09	Succeeded by None
