= A1 Team Switzerland =

Racing team

- Switzerland
- Founded: 2005
- Seat holder(s): Max Welti
- Team principal: -
- Race driver(s): Neel Jani
- Car nickname: -
- First race: 2005-06 Great Britain
- Rounds entered: 39 (78 starts)
- Championships: 1
- Sprint race victories: 5
- Feature race victories: 5
- Pole positions: 10
- Fastest laps: 8
- Total points: 438
- 2008-09 position: 2nd (95 pts)

A1 Team Switzerland was the Swiss team of A1 Grand Prix, an international racing series. The team were the A1 Grand Prix champions for the third season, 2007-08.

== Management ==
A1 Team Switzerland is owned by Max Welti.

== History ==
In the inaugural season, Team Switzerland were "best of the rest", with a victory and ten podiums, finishing 2nd in the championship.

Team Switzerland lost their competitive edge in 2006-07, with only a single race victory, and finishing 8th in the championship.

After a spectacular 2007–08 season, Neel Jani single-handedly clinched the championship for Team Switzerland, with four victories and seven podiums.

In 2008–09, after having scored 4 wins and 3 other podium finishes, Neel Jani scored a total of 95 points for Team Switzerland. At the end of the season, the team finished second in the championship, 17 points behind the champions, Team Ireland, and just 3 points ahead of Team Portugal.

== Drivers ==
Rahel Frey and Natacha Gachnang were the two first females to drive an A1 Grand Prix car during a race weekend.

They first drove as test drivers during a test session at Silverstone. Natacha Gachnang drove in the rookie sessions in the 2007-08 Czech round, on October 12, 2007; and Rahel Frey in the 2007-08 Malaysian rookie sessions, on November 23, 2007.

Name	Seasons	Rounds (Starts)	Titles	Wins	Sprint wins	Feature wins	2nd	3rd	Poles	Fastest Laps	Points
Sébastien Buemi	2006-07	6 (12 starts)									31
Neel Jani	2005-06, 2006-07, 2007-08, 2008-09	30 (60 starts)	1	10	5	5	9	11	10	8	407 (Note: This includes the 4 points scored during the 2008–09 Dutch Grand Prix, where the team scored its worst result of the 2008–09 season and the points of which were therefore later deducted.)
Marcel Fässler	2006-07	1 (2 starts)									0
Giorgio Mondini	2005-06	2 (4 starts)									0

== Complete A1 Grand Prix results ==
(key), "spr" indicates the Sprint Race, "fea" indicates the Feature Race.

Year	Racing team	Chassis, Engine, Tyres	Drivers	1	2	3	4	5	6	7	8	9	10	11	12	13	14	15	16	17	18	19	20	21	22	Points	Rank
2005–06	DAMS	Lola, Zytek, Cooper Avon		(United Kingdom) GBR		(Germany) GER		(Portugal) POR		(Australia) AUS		(Malaysia) MYS		(United Arab Emirates) UAE		(South Africa) RSA		(Indonesia) INA		(Mexico) MEX		(United States) USA		(China) CHN		121	2nd
2005–06	DAMS	Lola, Zytek, Cooper Avon		spr	fea	spr	fea	spr	fea	spr	fea	spr	fea	spr	fea	spr	fea	spr	fea	spr	fea	spr	fea	spr	fea	121	2nd
2005–06	DAMS	Lola, Zytek, Cooper Avon	Neel Jani	9	Ret	2	5	3	2	6	3	2	2	1	Ret	3	2	5	5	2	3					121	2nd
2005–06	DAMS	Lola, Zytek, Cooper Avon	Giorgio Mondini																			16	13	Ret	Ret	121	2nd
2006–07	Max Motorsport	Lola, Zytek, Cooper Avon		(Netherlands) NED		(Czech Republic) CZE		(China) BEI		(Malaysia) MYS		(Indonesia) INA		(New Zealand) NZL		(Australia) AUS		(South Africa) RSA		(Mexico) MEX		(China) SHA		(United Kingdom) GBR		50	8th
2006–07	Max Motorsport	Lola, Zytek, Cooper Avon		spr	fea	spr	fea	spr	fea	spr	fea	spr	fea	spr	fea	spr	fea	spr	fea	spr	fea	spr	fea	spr	fea	50	8th
2006–07	Max Motorsport	Lola, Zytek, Cooper Avon	Sébastien Buemi	10	8	8	10							5	4	4	7					4	9	Ret	DSQ	50	8th
2006–07	Max Motorsport	Lola, Zytek, Cooper Avon	Neel Jani					9	Ret	1	4	10	8					5	4							50	8th
2006–07	Max Motorsport	Lola, Zytek, Cooper Avon	Marcel Fässler																	10	14					50	8th
2007–08	Max Motorsport	Lola, Zytek, Cooper Avon		(Netherlands) NED		(Czech Republic) CZE		(Malaysia) MYS		(China) ZHU		(New Zealand) NZL		(Australia) AUS		(South Africa) RSA		(Mexico) MEX		(China) SHA		(United Kingdom) GBR				168	1st
2007–08	Max Motorsport	Lola, Zytek, Cooper Avon		spr	fea	spr	fea	spr	fea	spr	fea	spr	fea	spr	fea	spr	fea	spr	fea	spr	fea	spr	fea			168	1st
2007–08	Max Motorsport	Lola, Zytek, Cooper Avon	Neel Jani	5	3	8	3	1	1	2	6	Ret	13	10	2	3	1	3	19	1	5	4	3			168	1st
2008–09	Boer Racing Services	Ferrari, Ferrari, Michelin		(Netherlands) NED		(China) CHN		(Malaysia) MYS		(New Zealand) NZL		(South Africa) RSA		(Portugal) POR		(United Kingdom) GBR										95	2nd
2008–09	Boer Racing Services	Ferrari, Ferrari, Michelin		spr	fea	spr	fea	spr	fea	spr	fea	spr	fea	spr	fea	spr	fea									95	2nd
2008–09	Boer Racing Services	Ferrari, Ferrari, Michelin	Neel Jani	5	Ret	4	4	1	Ret	2	1	3	1	15	1	8	3									95	2nd

Sporting positions
Preceded by Germany	A1 Grand Prix Champion; 2007-08	Succeeded by Ireland (Republic of Ireland)
