= 2008 Sepang A1GP round =

2008–09 A1GP of Malaysia

Race Details
- Race 3 of 7 in the 2008–09 A1 Grand Prix season
- Date: November 23, 2008
- Location: Sepang International Circuit; Sepang, Malaysia
- Weather: Dry

Sprint race

Qualifying
- Pole: Switzerland (Neel Jani)
- Time: 1'47.154

Podium
- 1st: Switzerland (Neel Jani)
- 2nd: France (Loïc Duval)
- 3rd: New Zealand (Earl Bamber)

Fastest Lap
- FL: Switzerland (Neel Jani)
- Time: 1'48.550, (Lap 8)

Feature race

Qualifying
- Pole: Ireland (Adam Carroll)
- Time: 1'47.124

Podium
- 1st: Ireland (Adam Carroll)
- 2nd: Portugal (Filipe Albuquerque)
- 3rd: USA (Marco Andretti)

Fastest Lap
- FL: Ireland (Adam Carroll)
- Time: 1'48.563, (Lap 25)

Official Classifications
- PDF Booklet

The 2008–09 A1 Grand Prix of Nations, Malaysia was an A1 Grand Prix race held at Sepang International Circuit, Sepang, Malaysia.

== Pre-race ==
Because Great Britain, India and Mexico had only joined the season at the Chinese round, they were permitted to take part in a special practice session on November 20. In the wet conditions, Narain Karthikeyan was the fastest driver just in front of Danny Watts. Davíd Garza Pérez was the slowest with 3 seconds.

== Drivers ==
Team	Main Driver	Rookie Driver	Reserve Driver
Australia	John Martin	Ashley Walsh	
Brazil	Felipe Guimarães	Felipe Guimarães	
Canada	Did not participate		
China	Ho-Pin Tung		Congfu Cheng
France	Loïc Duval	Nicolas Prost	
Germany	Did not participate		
(United Kingdom) Great Britain	Danny Watts	Danny Watts	James Winslow
India	Narain Karthikeyan	Armaan Ebrahim	
Indonesia	Satrio Hermanto	Zahir Ali	
(Republic of Ireland) Ireland	Adam Carroll	Niall Quinn	
Italy	Edoardo Piscopo	Stefano Coletti	
(South Korea) Korea	Hwang Jin-Woo	Hwang Jin-Woo	
Lebanon	Daniel Morad	Daniel Morad	Jimmy Auby
Malaysia	Fairuz Fauzy	Aaron Lim	
Mexico	Davíd Garza Pérez		
Monaco	Clivio Piccione		
The Netherlands	Jeroen Bleekemolen	Dennis Retera	
New Zealand	Earl Bamber	Earl Bamber	Chris van der Drift
Pakistan	Did not participate		
Portugal	Filipe Albuquerque	Armando Parente	
South Africa	Adrian Zaugg	Gavin Cronje	
Switzerland	Neel Jani	Alexandre Imperatori	
(United States) USA	Marco Andretti	J. R. Hildebrand	

== Qualifying ==
The qualifying sessions were the first to utilise the new "joker" Qualifying lap rule – where the driver has PowerBoost available for use over an entire qualifying lap, to be used in any session at the team's discretion.

Sprint race qualifying
Pos	Team	Time	Gap
1	Switzerland	1'47.154	–
2	France	1'47.747	+0.593
3	New Zealand	1'47.779	+0.625
4	Portugal	1'48.930	+1.776
5	Italy	1'49.007	+1.853
6	(United Kingdom) Great Britain	1'49.076	+1.922
7	(Republic of Ireland) Ireland	1'49.197	+2.043
8	Mexico	1'49.293	+2.139
9	Netherlands	1'49.323	+2.169
10	India	1'49.350	+2.196
11	South Africa	1'49.528	+2.374
12	(United States) USA	1'49.650	+2.496
13	Malaysia	1'49.753	+2.599
14	Brazil	1'50.085	+2.931
15	Monaco	1'50.171	+3.017
16	Australia (1)	1'49.998	+2.844
17	China	1'50.274	+3.120
18	Lebanon	1'50.382	+3.228
19	Indonesia	1'51.423	+4.269
20	(South Korea) Korea	no time	–

Feature race qualifying
Pos	Team	Time	Gap
1	(Republic of Ireland) Ireland	1'47.124	–
2	(United Kingdom) Great Britain	1'47.340	+0.216
3	Lebanon	1'47.645	+0.521
4	Malaysia	1'47.648	+0.524
5	Portugal	1'47.680	+0.556
6	Netherlands	1'47.825	+0.701
7	India	1'47.848	+0.724
8	(United States) USA	1'47.866	+0.742
9	France	1'47.993	+0.869
10	China	1'48.126	+1.002
11	Monaco	1'48.242	+1.118
12	Brazil	1'48.323	+1.199
13	Australia	1'48.586	+1.462
14	Indonesia	1'48.839	+1.715
15	New Zealand	1'48.866	+1.742
16	Switzerland	1'48.980	+1.856
17	South Africa	1'49.061	+1.937
18	Mexico	1'49.537	+2.413
19	Italy	1'49.885	+2.761
20	(South Korea) Korea	no time	–

- (1) : Australia received a two-place grid penalty for the Sprint race for using a non-approved part in practice.

== Sprint Race ==
Following a major crash at the first start, involving (United States) USA, Brazil and India, and the pack slowed down after it seemed to have accelerated off, the race was delayed 30 minutes for track cleanup, and reduced to 11 laps.

This Sprint Race was the first this season to utilise the new Sprint Race pit-stop rule, the windows always set for Laps 4–8.

Pos	Team	Driver	Laps	Time	Points
1	Switzerland	Neel Jani	11	22'41.567	10 +1
2	France	Loïc Duval	11	+9.912	8
3	New Zealand	Earl Bamber	11	+11.813	6
4	Portugal	Filipe Albuquerque	11	+12.453	5
5	(Republic of Ireland) Ireland	Adam Carroll	11	+13.205	4
6	Netherlands	Jeroen Bleekemolen	11	+15.399	3
7	Italy	Edoardo Piscopo	11	+19.947	2
8	Australia	John Martin	11	+21.437	1
9	South Africa	Adrian Zaugg	11	+27.674	
10	China	Ho-Pin Tung	11	+29.492	
11	Lebanon	Daniel Morad	11	+32.049	
12	Monaco	Clivio Piccione	11	+32.406	
13	Indonesia	Satrio Hermanto	11	+38.959	
14	Mexico	Davíd Garza Pérez	11	+55.055	
15	Malaysia	Fairuz Fauzy	10	+1 lap	
Ret	(United Kingdom) Great Britain	Danny Watts	4	Gearbox	
Ret	Brazil	Felipe Guimarães	0	Accident	
Ret	India	Narain Karthikeyan	0	Accident	
Ret	(United States) USA	Marco Andretti	0	Accident	
DNS	(South Korea) Korea	Hwang Jin-Woo	–	Did not start	

Race red-flagged after the start because of accident.

== Feature Race ==
The second pit stop window was set for Laps 20–28. Switzerland were sent to the back of the grid for having a brake cooler in too long before the start, and a pit crew violation during the Sprint Race pit-stop.

Pos	Team	Driver	Laps	Time	Points
1	(Republic of Ireland) Ireland	Adam Carroll	34	1:05'52.205	15 +1
2	Portugal	Filipe Albuquerque	34	+15.996	12
3	(United States) USA	Marco Andretti	34	+47.637	10
4	Australia	John Martin	34	+51.679	8
5	South Africa	Adrian Zaugg	34	+52.106	6
6	New Zealand	Earl Bamber	34	+54.354	5
7	Brazil	Felipe Guimarães	34	+57.369	4
8	Netherlands	Jeroen Bleekemolen	34	+57.490	3
9	China	Ho-Pin Tung	34	+59.158	2
10	Malaysia	Fairuz Fauzy	34	+1'03.888	1
11	Italy	Edoardo Piscopo	34	+1'06.145	
12	Lebanon	Daniel Morad	34	+1'14.990	
13	Indonesia	Satrio Hermanto	34	+1'15.761	
14	France	Loïc Duval	34	+1'16.463	
15	Mexico	Davíd Garza Pérez	34	+1'30.001	
16	(United Kingdom) Great Britain	Danny Watts	28	+6 laps	
Ret	Monaco	Clivio Piccione	2	Mechanical	
Ret	India	Narain Karthikeyan	0	Collision	
Ret	Switzerland	Neel Jani	0	Collision	
DNS	(South Korea) Korea	Hwang Jin-Woo	–	Did not start	

== Notes ==
- It was the 35th race weekend (70 starts).
- It was the 4th race in Malaysia, and the 4th at Sepang International Circuit.
- It was the first race weekend as rookie driver for (Italy) Stefano Coletti, (United States) J. R. Hildebrand, (Portugal) Armando Parente and (Australia) Ashley Walsh.
- Records
  - Switzerland scored their 9th pole position as Neel Jani.
  - (Switzerland) Neel Jani scored their 7th fastest lap.
