= 2009 Kyalami A1GP round =

2008–09 A1GP of South Africa

Race Details
- Race 5 of 7 in the 2008–09 A1 Grand Prix season
- Date: 22 February 2009
- Location: Kyalami; Midrand, South Africa
- Weather: Clear, 27°C

Sprint race

Qualifying
- Pole: Netherlands (Jeroen Bleekemolen)
- Time: 1:27.717

Podium
- 1st: Netherlands (Jeroen Bleekemolen)
- 2nd: Portugal (Filipe Albuquerque)
- 3rd: Switzerland (Neel Jani)

Fastest Lap
- FL: Portugal (Filipe Albuquerque)
- Time: 1:29.072, (Lap 9)

Feature race

Qualifying
- Pole: Monaco (Clivio Piccione)
- Time: 1:27.269

Podium
- 1st: Switzerland (Neel Jani)
- 2nd: Brazil (Felipe Guimarães)
- 3rd: Monaco (Clivio Piccione)

Fastest Lap
- FL: Malaysia (Fairuz Fauzy)
- Time: 1:28.306, (Lap 15)

Official Classifications
- PDF Booklet

The 2008–09 A1 Grand Prix of Nations, South Africa was an A1 Grand Prix race which was held at Kyalami, South Africa.

== Pre-race ==
A1 Team Korea failed to participate the race as the organiser of the series could not supply electrical units and fuel tank due to mistake of the transportation from New Zealand. The team had planned the debut of 2008 Macau Grand Prix winner Keisuke Kunimoto (Lee Kyung-Woo), a Japanese driver of Korean descent, as rookie driver on the weekend.

== Drivers ==
Team	Main Driver	Rookie Driver(s)	Reserve Driver
Australia	John Martin	Ashley Walsh	
Brazil	Felipe Guimarães		
Canada	Did Not Participate		
China	Ho-Pin Tung		Congfu Cheng
France	Nicolas Prost	Nicolas Prost	
Germany	Michael Ammermüller	Michael Ammermüller	
(United Kingdom) Great Britain	Danny Watts	Danny Watts	James Winslow
India	Narain Karthikeyan	Parthiva Sureshwaren	
Indonesia	Zahir Ali	Zahir Ali	Satrio Hermanto
(Republic of Ireland) Ireland	Adam Carroll		
Italy	Edoardo Piscopo		
(South Korea) Korea	Did Not Participate		
Lebanon	Daniel Morad	Daniel Morad	Jimmy Auby
Malaysia	Fairuz Fauzy	Aaron Lim	
Mexico	Salvador Duran	Juan Pablo García	
Monaco	Clivio Piccione	Hubertus Bahlsen	
The Netherlands	Jeroen Bleekemolen	Dennis Retera	
New Zealand	Earl Bamber	Earl Bamber	Chris van der Drift
Pakistan	Did Not Participate		
Portugal	Filipe Albuquerque	António Félix da Costa	
South Africa	Adrian Zaugg	Gavin Cronje	Cristiano Morgado
Switzerland	Neel Jani	Alexandre Imperatori	
(United States) USA	Marco Andretti	J. R. Hildebrand	

== Qualifying ==
Sprint race qualifying
Pos	Team	Time	Gap
1	Netherlands	1:27.717	–
2	Portugal	1:28.072	+ 0.355
3	Switzerland	1:28.153	+ 0.436
4	Monaco	1:28.417	+ 0.700
5	India	1:28.431	+ 0.714
6	(Republic of Ireland) Ireland	1:28.437	+ 0.720
7	France	1:28.531	+ 0.814
8	South Africa	1:28.890	+ 1.173
9	Malaysia	1:28.904	+ 1.187
10	Italy	1:29.253	+ 1.536
11	Germany	1:29.337	+ 1.620
12	New Zealand	1:29.364	+ 1.647
13	(United Kingdom) Great Britain	1:29.567	+ 1.850
14	Brazil	1:29.726	+ 2.009
15	China	1:29.758	+ 2.041
16	Mexico	1:29.884	+ 2.167
17	(United States) USA	1:29.916	+ 2.199
18	Lebanon	1:30.136	+ 2.419
19	Australia	1:30.414	+ 2.697
20	Indonesia	no time	

Feature race qualifying
Pos	Team	Time	Gap
1	Monaco	1:27.269	–
2	Malaysia	1:27.405	+ 0.136
3	New Zealand	1:27.569	+ 0.300
4	Australia	1:28.439	+ 1.170
5	Switzerland	1:28.521	+ 1.252
6	(Republic of Ireland) Ireland	1:28.593	+ 1.324
7	Portugal	1:28.773	+ 1.504
8	Brazil	1:28.878	+ 1.609
9	Netherlands	1:28.926	+ 1.657
10	(United Kingdom) Great Britain	1:29.092	+ 1.823
11	France	1:29.155	+ 1.886
12	China	1:29.158	+ 1.889
13	Mexico	1:29.343	+ 2.074
14	(United States) USA	1:29.487	+ 2.218
15	Germany	1:29.565	+ 2.296
16	South Africa	1:29.884	+ 2.615
17	Italy	1:30.063	+ 2.794
18	India	1:30.505	+ 3.236
19	Indonesia	no time	
20	Lebanon	no time	

== Sprint Race ==
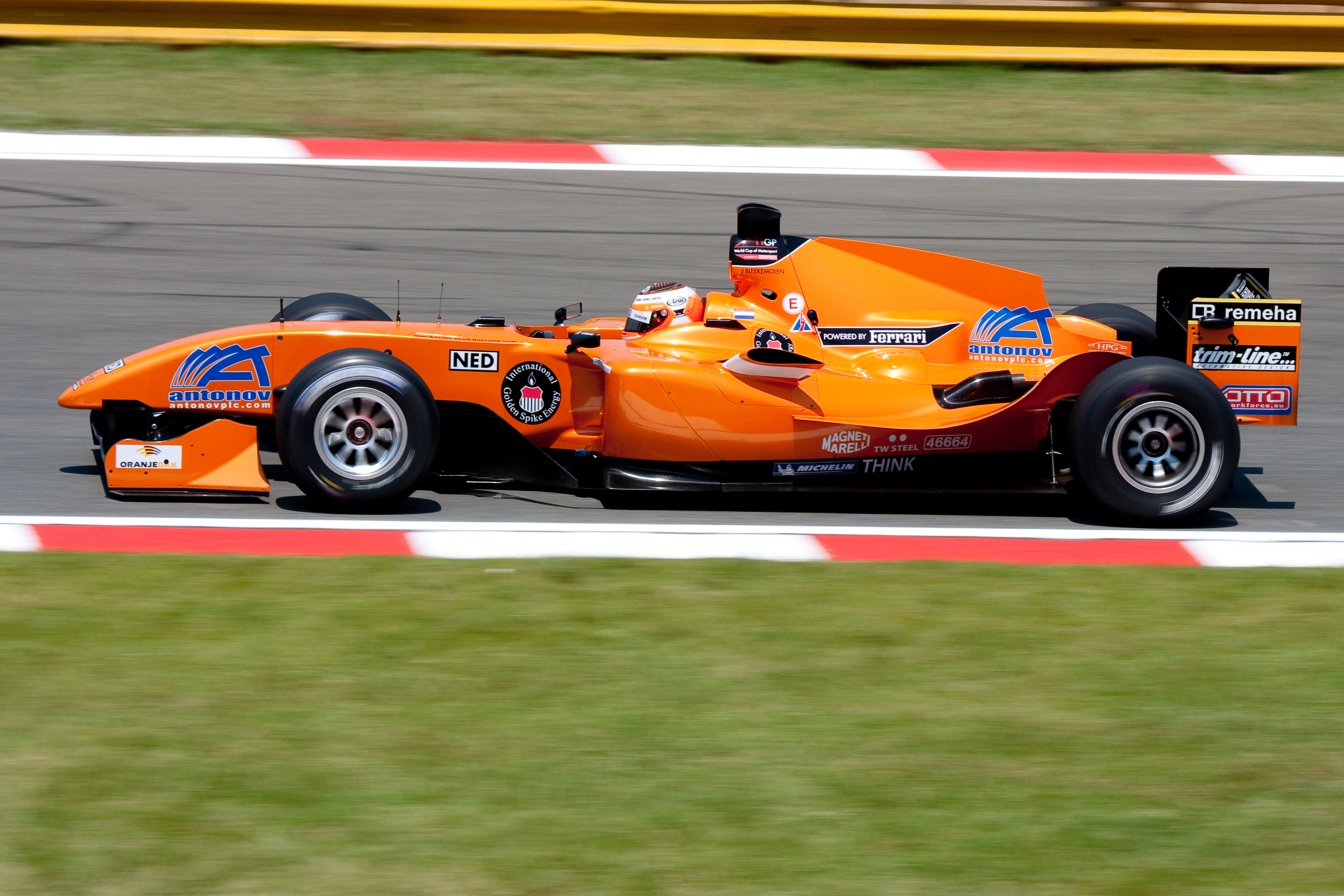
Jeroen Bleekemolen won the race from pole position for A1 Team the Netherlands, his first win in the series.

Pos	Team	Driver	Laps	Time	Points
1	Netherlands	Jeroen Bleekemolen	14	21:35.105	10
2	Portugal	Filipe Albuquerque	14	+ 4.407	8+1
3	Switzerland	Neel Jani	14	+ 10.600	6
4	(Republic of Ireland) Ireland	Adam Carroll	14	+ 12.925	5
5	Monaco	Clivio Piccione	14	+ 14.363	4
6	India	Narain Karthikeyan	14	+ 18.474	3
7	South Africa	Adrian Zaugg	14	+ 21.178	2
8	New Zealand	Earl Bamber	14	+ 26.539	1
9	Malaysia	Fairuz Fauzy	14	+ 26.925	
10	France	Nicolas Prost	14	+ 28.101	
11	Italy	Edoardo Piscopo	14	+ 32.081	
12	Australia	John Martin	14	+ 34.474	
13	China	Ho-Pin Tung	14	+ 37.804	
14	Germany	Michael Ammermüller	14	+ 39.068	
15	Brazil	Felipe Guimarães	14	+ 39.717	
16	Mexico	Salvador Durán	14	+ 45.006	
17	(United States) USA	Marco Andretti	14	+ 55.636	
18	Indonesia	Zahir Ali	14	+ 1:17.724	
19	(United Kingdom) Great Britain	Danny Watts	9	Accident	
20	Lebanon	Daniel Morad	6	+ 8 Laps	

== Feature Race ==
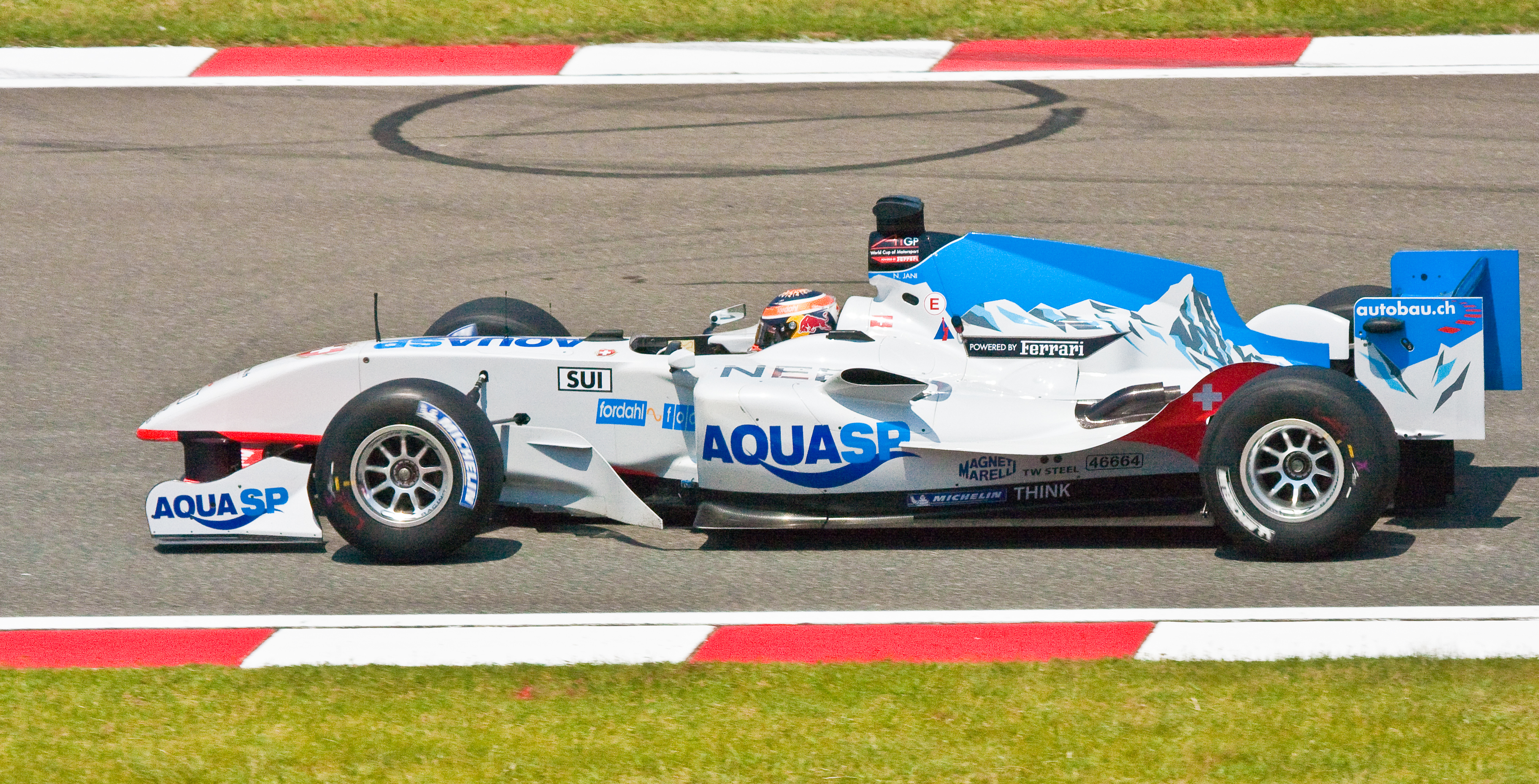
A1 Team Switzerland's Neel Jani won the race, and after Adam Carroll's earlier error, acquired the championship lead.

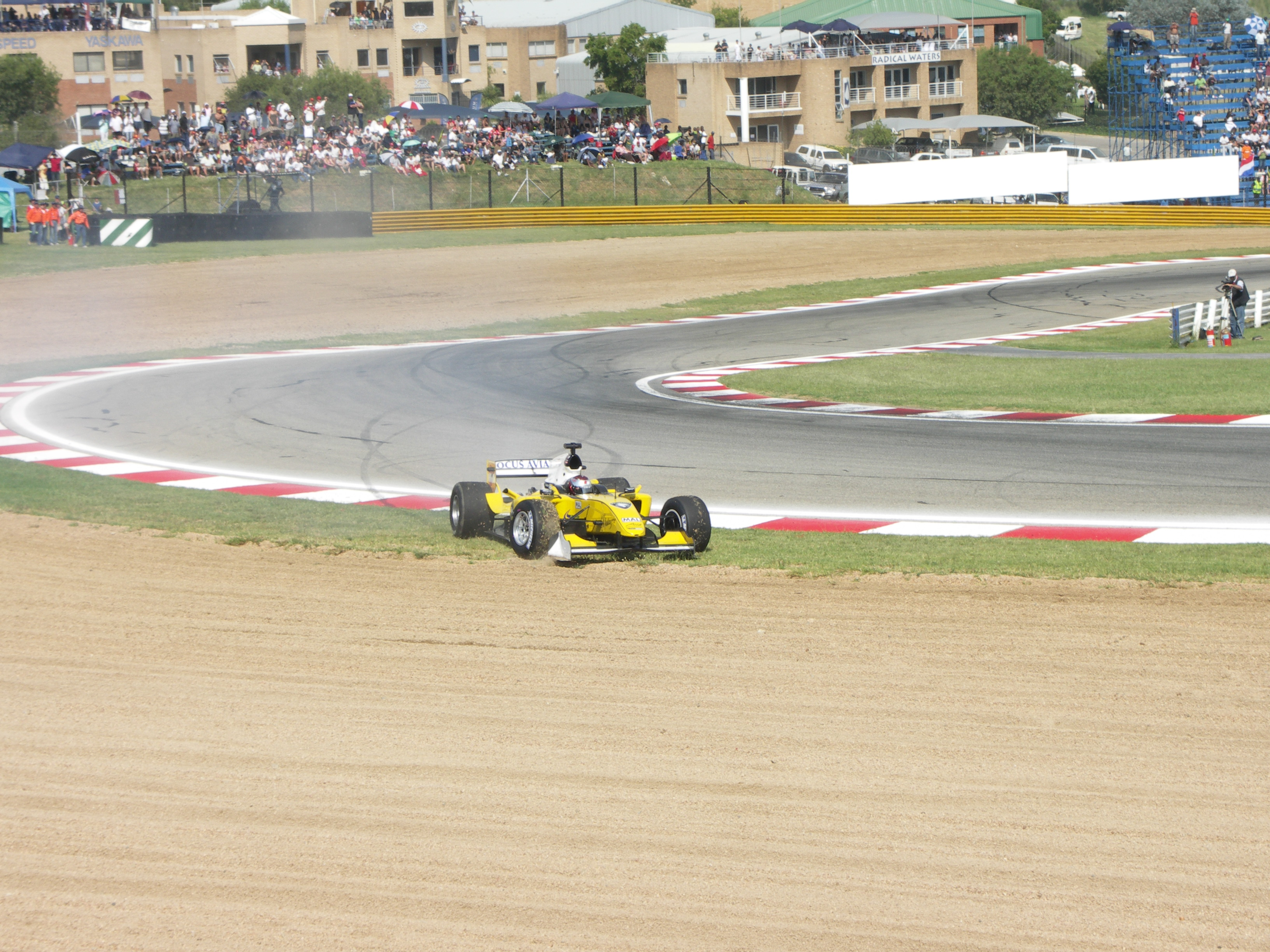
A1 Team Malaysia's Fairuz Fauzy recorded the fastest lap of the race.

Pos	Team	Driver	Laps	Time	Points
1	Switzerland	Neel Jani	40	1:02:24.617	15
2	Brazil	Felipe Guimarães	40	+ 13.176	12
3	Monaco	Clivio Piccione	40	+ 14.193	10
4	Netherlands	Jeroen Bleekemolen	40	+ 17.024	8
5	Portugal	Filipe Albuquerque	40	+ 17.995	6
6	Lebanon	Daniel Morad	40	+ 31.210	5
7	(United Kingdom) Great Britain	Danny Watts	40	+ 34.328	4
8	(United States) USA	Marco Andretti	40	+ 59.000	3
9	Indonesia	Zahir Ali	40	+ 1:03.995	2
10	Italy	Edoardo Piscopo	40	+ 1:04.856	1
11	Germany	Michael Ammermüller	40	+ 1:08.603	
12	India	Narain Karthikeyan	40	+ 1:09.150	
13	Australia	John Martin	40	+ 1:20.545	
14	China	Ho-Pin Tung	22	Electrics	
15	Malaysia	Fairuz Fauzy	17	+ 23 Laps	0+1
16	South Africa	Adrian Zaugg	15	Electrics	
17	New Zealand	Earl Bamber	3	Accident	
18	France	Nicolas Prost	3	Accident	
19	Mexico	Salvador Durán	3	Accident	
20	(Republic of Ireland) Ireland	Adam Carroll	0	Spin	

== Post-race ==
Following the race, the team principals of both Ireland and Malaysia issued statements regarding the on-track incident on the first lap of the Feature Race, which resulted in Ireland spinning out into retirement, and subsequently losing the championship lead to Switzerland.

Frankly, I'm disgusted. We're pushing to win a championship and it's not the only time that this driver has caused incidents, doing the same thing to New Zealand later in the race. That's cost us the championship points lead that we fought so hard to create. We were on course to consolidate our points lead today but for a piece of poor driving. A1 Team Malaysia is one of the very best in A1GP, but today their driver has cost us dearly.

— Mark Gallagher, A1 Team Ireland team principal

It's understandable that A1 Team Ireland was feeling emotional and frustrated after this incident, considering also that they lost the lead in the A1GP World Cup of Motorsport. However, to blame Fairuz for the incident is unfair and we think the Irish team should stick to trying to win races rather than blaming others for their misfortune. A1 Team Ireland is a highly respected team, but on this occasion their comments are ill-judged.

— Jack Cunningham, A1 Team Malaysia chief executive

== Notes ==
- It was the 37th race weekend (74 starts).
- It was the 4th race in South Africa but the first at Kyalami.
- Records:
  - It was the first ever pole position for Monaco and Clivio Piccione.
  - It was the first ever podium for Monaco and Clivio Piccione.
  - Switzerland's win in the feature race was driver Neel Jani's ninth in A1 Grand Prix, tying the record held by Nico Hülkenberg.
  - Lebanon recorded the best finish in their history thanks to Daniel Morad's sixth in the feature race.
