= 2005 Eastern Creek A1GP round =

2005–06 A1GP of Australia

Race Details
- Race 4 of 11 in the 2005–06 A1 Grand Prix season
- Date: 6 November 2005
- Location: Eastern Creek Raceway; Sydney, New South Wales, Australia
- Weather: Fine

Qualifying
- Pole: France (Nicolas Lapierre)
- Time: 2'37.036 (1'18.150, 1'18.886)

Sprint Race
- 1st: France (Nicolas Lapierre)
- 2nd: Portugal (Álvaro Parente)
- 3rd: Brazil (Nelson Piquet Jr.)

Main Race
- 1st: France (Nicolas Lapierre)
- 2nd: Great Britain (Robbie Kerr)
- 3rd: Switzerland (Neel Jani)

Fast Lap
- FL: France (Nicolas Lapierre)
- Time: 1'19.751, (Lap 8 of Sprint Race)

Official Classifications
- Prac1 ·Prac2 ·Prac3 ·Qual ·SRace ·MRace

Layout of the Eastern Creek Raceway

The 2005–06 A1 Grand Prix of Nations, Australia was an A1 Grand Prix race held on the weekend of 6 November 2005 at the Eastern Creek Raceway in Sydney, Australia. Approximately 51,000 fans attended the event over the three days.

== Report ==
=== Practice ===
The fourth round of the 2005–06 A1 Grand Prix season was held in Australia, and the field was again reduced to 24 nations following the withdrawal of A1 Team Indonesia due to driver Ananda Mikola's commitments to his Formula 3 Championship. Within 10 minutes of the start of the first practice session, the lap record at Eastern Creek Raceway was broken by A1 Team Brazil driver Nelson Piquet Jr. Piquet set a time of 1'19.266 on his fourth lap of the day, breaking the previous record by more than 3 seconds. This time would end the session at the top of the sheets, but by that time another 13 teams had beaten the previous record, which was set in a Formula Holden. It rained heavily midway through the session, leaving Mexico's Salvador Durán in second place, but more than a second behind the pacesetter Piquet. A1 Team France came in third with a 1'20.627, followed by Switzerland and a resurgent New Zealand. A1 Team China managed 13th place, 3.116 seconds behind Piquet, whilst A1 Team Russia continued to struggle, down in 23rd, ahead of only A1 Team India, whose car was still slightly damaged from the previous race.

The track dried in time for the second timed session, which saw France's Nicolas Lapierre come out on top with a 1'21.037. Brazil and Switzerland continued their good form to come in 2nd and 3rd, in a session where the top 11 cars were within one second of France's best time. USA's Bryan Herta, on debut, was just outside this range, coming in 12th with a 1'22.084, followed by Great Britain's Robbie Kerr, just 0.089 seconds behind. Italian driver Andrea Montermini, also on debut, came in last, but was creditably less than one second behind Pakistan's 19th-placed time of 1'23.127. China's Tengyi Jiang suffered a 100 mph accident late in the session, causing it to be red-flagged, and leaving the Chinese team with a long night ahead of them to rebuild the car in time for qualifying.

Practice 3 on Sunday saw Brazil return to the head of the field, with Piquet setting a time of 1'19.476. Malaysia's former F1 driver Alex Yoong came in 2nd with a 1'19.840, followed by Great Britain, Portugal and A1 Team Germany, with home team Australia finishing the session with the sixth fastest time. Enrico Toccacelo returned to the Italian car to set the eighth quickest time, while China proved that their hard work overnight paid off, Tengyi coming in 20th. USA came in 22nd, while A1 Team Canada elected not to set a time for the session, preferring to conserve their tyres for the qualifying session.

=== Qualifying ===
Qualifying saw France take its second pole position of the season, and possibly setting itself up for an incredible fifth consecutive race victory. Lapierre posted a 1'18.886 on his first lap, followed by a remarkable 1'18.150 on his second to put himself in a good position for the rest of the session. However, Portugal, Switzerland and Brazil were all able to respond with sub-1'19 laps on the second run to give themselves a chance at the top spot. Lapierre was unable to improve on either of his times on his third lap, and with Portugal setting a 1'18.582 to move to just 0.490 seconds behind on aggregate, France took the risk of waiting in the garage to see if they needed to defend their provisional pole. However, Álvaro Parente was only able to manage a 1'19.685, leaving him in second position. The front-row result, however, is Portugal's best in the series so far. The usual suspects of Switzerland, Brazil and Great Britain completed the top 5, with A1 Team Ireland's Ralph Firman taking 6th. Traditional rivals Australia and New Zealand will line up together on the seventh row of the grid, after Will Davison and Jonny Reid qualified 13th and 14th respectively at their teams' "home" race. Bryan Herta continued to struggle in his first round, and will line up 22nd for the sprint race, ahead of only Austria and India. Remarkably, by the end of the third qualifying session, all 24 teams entered into the round had broken the previous Eastern Creek lap record.

=== Sprint race ===
France, starting from the front on the rolling start, managed to hold its lead into turn 1, followed closely by Portugal and Brazil, able to move up from fourth. The cars got through the corner cleanly, but as they arrived at the tighter turn 2, A1 Team Czech Republic and A1 Team South Africa got tangled up and both ended up in the dirt. South Africa managed to rejoin the race, albeit in last position, but the race was unfortunately over for the Czech Republic before Tomáš Enge was even able to complete a lap. The incident saw the safety car deployed in order to allow marshalls to remove the Czech car from a potentially dangerous position, forcing the cars to remain in order until it left pulled into the pits at the end of lap 3. As the race restarted, France held its lead over Portugal, Brazil, Ireland and Great Britain, with Switzerland in sixth spot after losing three positions off the line. Further back in the field there was again trouble at turn 2 from the restart, with both 11th-placed Germany and 12th-placed Mexico locking their brakes and spinning out of the race. Toccacelo in the Italian car somehow managed to avoid the chaos, dropping just one position to 11th as Australia moved into a pointscoring position. The safety car was again deployed while the cars were recovered, protecting France's lead for a further 3 laps.

The racing restarted on lap 8, with The Netherlands (7th) and Switzerland (6th) locked in a fascinating battle, but the experience Jos Verstappen was unable to make his moves stick. Also at the restart, Italy was able to make a move on Australia to move into the potential pointscoring position of tenth. Another battle arose on the ninth lap, and ended when Stephen Simpson (South Africa) and Basil Shaaban (Lebanon) had a collision, which forced Simpson out of the race with rear suspension damage. Shaaban was able to continue in the race for a few more laps, but the damage had taken its toll, slowing the Lebanese driver before he eventually pulled out. France was able to hold its lead for the remainder of the race, keeping a steady 3 second gap back to Portugal, who was concentrating on keeping the fast-moving Brazil behind. When the allocated 30 minutes were complete, the race was ended, France taking its fifth consecutive win in the series (and Lapierre's third) to increase its points gap back to Brazil. Portugal and Brazil took the other podium positions, while Italy was able to hold on to the final point. France was also able to set the race's fastest lap, meaning a possible extra point to add to its ever-increasing tally. One lap from the end, Austria and Japan spun off together without contact, whilst in a three-way tussle with USA for 15th place. Herta managed to keep his car straight, driving between the two others as they went off the circuit and eventually finishing 15th.

=== Main race ===
After its dominant win in the earlier sprint race, Team France took pole position for the 40-lap feature race. However, a poor start saw Lapierre drop to third as second-placed Portugal took the lead into the first corner, followed by Brazil. Ireland, starting from fourth, dropped down to 12th, while Australia moved up to 7th from 11th position on the grid. The first retirement of the race came on only the second lap, as South African driver Stephen Simpson was forced to swerve around Italy's Enrico Toccacelo after he reportedly "slowed suddenly on the racing line". The car slammed into the barrier and the damage was enough to force the team out of the race. Ireland reacted to its poor start by calling in Ralph Firman for his compulsory pit stop on the second lap, leaving the car in 18th position of the 23 cars remaining in the race. The order of the top 10 teams remained the same until lap 8, with Portugal handed a drive-through penalty for a false start. This gave France the race lead, with Great Britain second. Lap 8 also saw a collision, as Mexico and Russia crashed at turn two, forcing both into early retirement from 11th and 12th positions. Lebanon, following closely behind, was able to narrowly avoid being taken out by the pair, and moved into 12th after a short trip through the gravel.

The incident brought out the safety car, which gave many of the teams the opportunity to take their pitstops. Front-runners France and Great Britain both peeled off into the pits on lap 9, handing Lebanon the race lead, a remarkable occurrence given the team had not yet scored a point in A1GP. Switzerland also benefited from the safety car period, moving into fourth spot, whilst Australia dropped four positions to 8th. The cars held their on-track positions until the safety car left the circuit on lap 12, ending Lebanon's moment of glory as they were shuffled back to third on lap 13, then 8th, 11th and 19th (last) on consecutive laps. Brazil, who already had wheel nut problems in their pitstop drop them down the field, were dealt a further blow when they were handed a penalty for an infringement on that stop. The penalty left Brazil in 16th place with only 15 laps remaining.

On lap 18, Austria and the Czech Republic collided whilst sitting in 13th and 14th, forcing both cars out of the race. The safety car was deployed again as the debris was cleared away, not leaving the circuit until lap 21. The deployment of the safety car again cut into France's lead, and bunched up the cars at the front of the field. Michael Devaney, sensing an opportunity to move out of 8th at the restart, accidentally passed the Portuguese car before the start-finish line, and incurred a 25-second penalty, which was added at the end of the race. Meanwhile, Brazil attempted to move up the field from 15th, but as he moved to overtake Tengyi Jiang in the Chinese car, India's Armaan Ebrahim forced Tengyi to brake hard, his engine stopped suddenly, causing his retirement.

A more dramatic incident, however, occurred on lap 26. Japanese driver Hayanari Shimoda went off the circuit at turn one at very high speed, the car flipping several times before hitting a wall on the outside of the corner. Shimoda was removed from the car by emergency staff, and airlifted by helicopter to Westmead Hospital where precautionary checks were undertaken. Shimoda was later declared fit after spending the night at the hospital, demonstrating the overall strength of the A1 Grand Prix cars. The safety car was sent out for the third time in the race, but the amount of debris created in the accident meant that safety crews were unable to fully clear the circuit until lap 33, when racing restarted. However, the time taken during the safety car periods meant that the scheduled 40 laps could not be completed in the allotted one hour, and the race was ended just two laps later. France took the win over Great Britain and Switzerland, followed by the Netherlands, Malaysia, Australia and Portugal. Ireland finished the race in 7th spot, but the 25-second penalty dropped the team out of the points to 14th, allowing New Zealand, Brazil and the US to add to their respective tallies. France's fastest lap during the feature race of 1'21.015 was not quick enough to beat their best in the sprint race, but the team walked away with a maximum 21 points for the second round in succession. The result boosted France's season tally to 71, well ahead of Brazil on 52, who are closely trailed by Switzerland, just 10 points behind.

== Results ==
=== Qualification ===
Qualification took place on Saturday, 5 November 2005.

Pos	Team	Driver	Q1 Time	Q2 Time	Q3 Time	Q4 Time	Aggregate	Gap
1	France	Nicolas Lapierre	1'18.886	1'18.150	1'19.565	--	2'37.036	--
2	Portugal	Álvaro Parente	1'20.635	1'18.944	1'18.582	1'19.685	2'37.526	0.490
3	Switzerland	Neel Jani	1'19.337	1'18.850	1'20.035	1'18.786	2'37.636	0.600
4	Brazil	Nelson Piquet Jr.	1'20.324	1'18.964	1'19.323	1'19.118	2'38.082	1.046
5	(United Kingdom) Great Britain	Robbie Kerr	1'20.708	1'19.095	1'19.027	1'20.679	2'38.122	1.086
6	(Republic of Ireland) Ireland	Michael Devaney	1'21.769	1'19.022	1'20.011	1'19.605	2'38.627	1.591
7	Canada	Sean McIntosh	1'21.405	1'21.126	1'19.786	1'18.850	2'38.636	1.600
8	The Netherlands	Jos Verstappen	1'20.072	1'19.239	1'20.441	1'19.430	2'38.669	1.633
9	Malaysia	Alex Yoong	1'21.183	1'19.660	1'19.594	1'19.126	2'38.720	1.684
10	Mexico	Salvador Durán	1'19.876	1'19.556	1'20.154	1'19.403	2'38.959	1.923
11	Italy	Enrico Toccacelo	1'20.983	1'19.779	1'20.622	1'19.405	2'39.184	2.148
12	Germany	Adrian Sutil	1'21.274	1'19.876	1'20.390	1'19.503	2'39.379	2.343
13	Australia	Will Davison	1'20.777	1'20.737	1'19.445	1'19.957	2'39.402	2.366
14	New Zealand	Jonny Reid	1'19.786	1'20.523	1'19.728	1'20.434	2'39.514	2.478
15	South Africa	Stephen Simpson	1'22.373	1'20.106	1'20.460	1'19.789	2'39.895	2.859
16	Czech Republic	Tomáš Enge	1'22.482	1'20.549	1'20.696	1'19.560	2'40.109	3.073
17	Pakistan	Adam Khan	1'20.837	1'20.134	1'20.263	--	2'40.397	3.361
18	Russia	Roman Rusinov	1'22.068	1'21.507	1'20.046	1'20.625	2'40.671	3.635
19	Japan	Hayanari Shimoda	1'23.218	1'20.365	1'20.524	1'21.022	2'40.889	3.853
20	China	Tengyi Jiang	1'23.397	1'20.946	1'21.497	1'20.835	2'41.781	4.745
21	Lebanon	Basil Shaaban	1'23.148	1'20.942	1'21.439	1'21.072	2'42.014	4.978
22	(United States) USA	Bryan Herta	1'21.274	1'21.598	1'21.156	1'20.977	2'42.133	5.097
23	Austria	Mathias Lauda	--	1'21.197	1'21.620	1'20.945	2'42.142	5.106
24	India	Armaan Ebrahim	1'23.188	1'22.807	1'21.123	1'21.423	2'42.546	5.510

=== Sprint Race results ===
The Sprint Race took place on Sunday, 6 November 2005.

Pos	Team	Driver	Laps	Time	Points
1	France	Nicolas Lapierre	19	30:32.582	10
2	Portugal	Álvaro Parente	19	+8.699	9
3	Brazil	Nelson Piquet Jr.	19	+9.095	8
4	(Republic of Ireland) Ireland	Michael Devaney	19	+12.485	7
5	(United Kingdom) Great Britain	Robbie Kerr	19	+17.473	6
6	Switzerland	Neel Jani	19	+19.984	5
7	The Netherlands	Jos Verstappen	19	+24.556	4
8	Malaysia	Alex Yoong	19	+26.836	3
9	Canada	Sean McIntosh	19	+27.886	2
10	Italy	Enrico Toccacelo	19	+29.820	1
11	Australia	Will Davison	19	+30.426	
12	Pakistan	Adam Khan	19	+38.112	
13	Russia	Roman Rusinov	19	+39.018	
14	New Zealand	Jonny Reid	19	+40.064	
15	(United States) USA	Bryan Herta	19	+49.910	
16	China	Tengyi Jiang	19	+51.119	
17	India	Armaan Ebrahim	19	+52.753	
18	Japan	Hayanari Shimoda	18	+1 Lap	
19	Austria	Mathias Lauda	18	+1 Lap	
DNF	Lebanon	Basil Shaaban	11	Damage	
DNF	South Africa	Stephen Simpson	8	Damage	
DNF	Mexico	Salvador Durán	3	Collision	
DNF	Germany	Adrian Sutil	3	Collision	
DNF	Czech Republic	Tomáš Enge	0	Crash	

=== Main Race results ===
The Main Race took place on Sunday, 6 November 2005.

Pos	Team	Driver	Laps	Time	Points
1	France	Nicolas Lapierre	35	1:00:54.068	10
2	(United Kingdom) Great Britain	Robbie Kerr	35	+2.479	9
3	Switzerland	Neel Jani	35	+3.018	8
4	The Netherlands	Jos Verstappen	35	+3.525	7
5	Malaysia	Alex Yoong	35	+4.887	6
6	Australia	Will Davison	35	+5.431	5
7	Portugal	Álvaro Parente	35	+6.002	4
8	New Zealand	Jonny Reid	35	+8.921	3
9	Brazil	Nelson Piquet Jr.	35	+9.040	2
10	(United States) USA	Bryan Herta	35	+9.828	1
11	Pakistan	Adam Khan	35	+10.942	
12	Lebanon	Basil Shaaban	35	+13.003	
13	India	Armaan Ebrahim	35	+14.275	
14	(Republic of Ireland) Ireland	Michael Devaney	35	+32.072	
15	Canada	Sean McIntosh	26	Damage	
16	Japan	Hayanari Shimoda	25	Crash	
DNF	China	Tengyi Jiang	22	Engine	
DNF	Austria	Mathias Lauda	17	Collision	
DNF	Czech Republic	Tomáš Enge	17	Collision	
DNF	Russia	Roman Rusinov	7	Collision	
DNF	Mexico	Salvador Durán	7	Collision	
DNF	Germany	Adrian Sutil	7	Mechanical	
DNF	Italy	Enrico Toccacelo	6	Damage	
DNF	South Africa	Stephen Simpson	1	Crash	

=== Total Points ===
Team	Points	SR	MR	FL
France	21	10	10	1
(United Kingdom) Great Britain	15	6	9	--
Portugal	13	9	4	--
Switzerland	13	5	8	--
The Netherlands	11	4	7	--
Brazil	10	8	2	--
Malaysia	9	3	6	--
(Republic of Ireland) Ireland	7	7	--	--
Australia	5	--	5	--
New Zealand	3	--	3	--
Canada	2	2	--	--
Italy	1	1	--	--
(United States) USA	1	--	1	--

- Fastest Lap: A1 Team France (1'19.751 / 177.4 km/h, lap 8 of Sprint Race)
