= 2008 Chengdu A1GP round =

2008–09 A1GP of China

Race Details
- Race 2 of 7 in the 2008–09 A1 Grand Prix season
- Date: November 9, 2008
- Location: Chengdu Goldenport Circuit; Chengdu, Sichuan Province, People's Republic of China
- Weather: Clear, 20°C

Sprint race

Qualifying
- Pole: Ireland (Adam Carroll)
- Time: 1'15.423

Podium
- 1st: Ireland (Adam Carroll)
- 2nd: Netherlands (Robert Doornbos)
- 3rd: Great Britain (Danny Watts)

Fastest Lap
- FL: Ireland (Adam Carroll)
- Time: 1'16.084, (Lap 17)

Feature race

Qualifying
- Pole: Great Britain (Danny Watts)
- Time: 1'15.325

Podium
- 1st: Portugal (Filipe Albuquerque)
- 2nd: Ireland (Adam Carroll)
- 3rd: Great Britain (Danny Watts)

Fastest Lap
- FL: Netherlands (Robert Doornbos)
- Time: 1'15.212, (Lap 33)

Official Classifications
- PDF Booklet

The 2008–09 A1 Grand Prix of Nations, China was an A1 Grand Prix race, held at Chengdu Goldenport Circuit, Chengdu, People's Republic of China.

All proceeds from this race were donated to the Sichuan Earthquake Relief Fund, following the earthquake which devastated the region in May 2008.

== Drivers ==
After missing the first race due to a lack of cars, A1 Teams Great Britain, India and Mexico took part in this race. Both A1 Team Pakistan and A1 Team Germany will not make their season debut until the fourth round at Taupo. Team Pakistan require more changes to their chassis to render it suitable for their lead driver Adam Khan, while Team Germany is undergoing management restructuring.

The status of A1 Team Canada was not announced, but they were removed from the race's drivers list on the A1GP website front page, and did not make an appearance. Their status for future events is still unknown.

Team	Main Driver	Rookie Driver
Australia	John Martin	
Brazil	Felipe Guimarães	Felipe Guimarães
Canada	Did Not Participate	
China	Ho-Pin Tung	
France	Nicolas Prost	Nicolas Prost
Germany	Did Not Participate	
(United Kingdom) Great Britain	Danny Watts	Danny Watts
India	Narain Karthikeyan	Narain Karthikeyan^{↑}
Indonesia	Satrio Hermanto	Zahir Ali
(Republic of Ireland) Ireland	Adam Carroll	Niall Quinn
Italy	Edoardo Piscopo	Christian Montanari
(South Korea) Korea	Hwang Jin-Woo	Hwang Jin-Woo
Lebanon	Daniel Morad	Daniel Morad
Malaysia	Fairuz Fauzy	Aaron Lim
Mexico	Davíd Garza Pérez	Davíd Garza Pérez
Monaco	Clivio Piccione	
The Netherlands	Robert Doornbos	Dennis Retera
New Zealand	Chris van der Drift	Chris van der Drift
Pakistan	Did Not Participate	
Portugal	Filipe Albuquerque	
South Africa	Adrian Zaugg	
Switzerland	Neel Jani	Alexandre Imperiatori
(United States) USA	Marco Andretti	Marco Andretti↑

↑ Karthikeyan and Andretti were granted special dispensation to participate in the rookie session as neither team had completed as many testing miles as the other teams with the new car. Karthikeyan (F1) and Andretti (IRL ICS) are veteran drivers in one of the four series (F1, GP2, FN, IRL-ICS) which their drivers may not compete as A1GP rookies.

== Qualifying ==
Due to a delay in recovering the (Italy) Italian car after spinning into a gravel trap during the first qualifying session, the second qualifying session was cancelled, meaning all times from Q1 set the field for Q1, with (Republic of Ireland) Ireland taking their first ever pole position, ahead of The Netherlands and Switzerland.

Q4 was stopped briefly after a spin for France. The session was resumed with teams able to make a run in time. Danny Watts for (United Kingdom) Great Britain took pole ahead of (Republic of Ireland) Ireland and Portugal.

Sprint race qualifying
Pos	Team	Time	Gap
1	(Republic of Ireland) Ireland	1'15.423	–
2	Netherlands	1'15.492	+0.069
3	Switzerland	1'15.683	+0.260
4	(United Kingdom) Great Britain	1'15.799	+0.376
5	Portugal	1'16.124	+0.701
6	France	1'16.164	+0.741
7	South Africa	1'16.268	+0.845
8	New Zealand	1'16.505	+1.082
9	India	1'16.553	+1.130
10	Monaco	1'16.794	+1.371
11	Australia	1'17.054	+1.631
12	Brazil	1'17.131	+1.708
13	Lebanon	1'17.143	+1.720
14	Malaysia	1'17.171	+1.748
15	Italy	1'17.288	+1.865
16	(United States) USA	1'17.437	+2.014
17	Mexico	1'18.025	+2.602
18	China	1'18.128	+2.703
19	Indonesia	1'19.479	+4.056
20	(South Korea) Korea	1'20.102	+4.679

Feature race qualifying
Pos	Team	Time	Gap
1	(United Kingdom) Great Britain	1'15.325	–
2	(Republic of Ireland) Ireland	1'15.356	+0.031
3	Portugal	1'15.400	+0.075
4	Switzerland	1'15.621	+0.296
5	South Africa	1'15.947	+0.622
6	Malaysia	1'15.963	+0.638
7	Monaco	1'16.016	+0.691
8	Netherlands	1'16.124	+0.799
9	Australia	1'16.289	+0.964
10	Brazil	1'16.403	+1.078
11	(United States) USA	1'16.557	+1.232
12	France	1'16.604	+1.279
13	Lebanon	1'16.702	+1.377
14	Mexico	1'16.965	+1.660
15	New Zealand	1'17.176	+1.851
16	India	1'17.218	+1.893
17	China	1'17.299	+1.974
18	Indonesia	1'17.759	+2.434
19	Italy	1'17.845	+2.520
20	(South Korea) Korea	1'18.875	+3.550

== Sprint Race ==
For safety reasons, a pit stop was not required for the Sprint Race. In lap 2, Brazil is slowing and the Safety car is on while Felipe Guimarães reach the pits. In the same lap 2, China spun and lost some positions but finally catch up and pass (South Korea) Korea on lap 7. when the Safety car is out, the order was (Republic of Ireland) Ireland, Netherlands, (United Kingdom) Great Britain, Switzerland, South Africa, Portugal, New Zealand and France. Those positions remain until the end of the race with the fastest lap for (Republic of Ireland) Adam Carroll.

Pos	Team	Driver	Laps	Time	Points
1	(Republic of Ireland) Ireland	Adam Carroll	18	22'58.740	10 +1
2	Netherlands	Robert Doornbos	18	+2.037	8
3	(United Kingdom) Great Britain	Danny Watts	18	+14.361	6
4	Switzerland	Neel Jani	18	+14.619	5
5	South Africa	Adrian Zaugg	18	+20.108	4
6	Portugal	Filipe Albuquerque	18	+20.475	3
7	New Zealand	Chris van der Drift	18	+27.224	2
8	France	Nicolas Prost	18	+27.923	1
9	Monaco	Clivio Piccione	18	+30.378	
10	India	Narain Karthikeyan	18	+32.268	
11	Australia	John Martin	18	+33.198	
12	Lebanon	Daniel Morad	18	+34.293	
13	Malaysia	Fairuz Fauzy	18	+34.665	
14	Italy	Edoardo Piscopo	18	+36.541	
15	(United States) USA	Marco Andretti	18	+38.102	
16	Mexico	Davíd Garza Pérez	18	+42.511	
17	China	Ho-Pin Tung	18	+49.611	
18	Indonesia	Satrio Hermanto	18	+1'04.128	
19	(South Korea) Korea	Hwang Jin-Woo	18	+1'06.171	
20	Brazil	Felipe Guimarães	14	+4 laps	

== Feature Race ==
The second pit-stop window for the Feature Race was set for Laps 24–32.

Pos	Team	Driver	Laps	Time	Points
1	Portugal	Filipe Albuquerque	51	1:11'23.179	15
2	(Republic of Ireland) Ireland	Adam Carroll	51	+0.571	12
3	(United Kingdom) Great Britain	Danny Watts	51	+4.802	10
4	Switzerland	Neel Jani	51	+7.157	8
5	Malaysia	Fairuz Fauzy	51	+13.302	6
6	Australia	John Martin	51	+15.544	5
7	Monaco	Clivio Piccione	51	+16.236	4
8	(United States) USA	Marco Andretti	51	+16.690	3
9	South Africa	Adrian Zaugg	51	+18.030	2
10	India	Narain Karthikeyan	51	+18.579	1
11	New Zealand	Chris van der Drift	51	+19.675	
12	China	Ho-Pin Tung	51	+20.126	
13	Lebanon	Daniel Morad	51	+22.580	
14	Indonesia	Satrio Hermanto	51	+31.285	
15	Mexico	Davíd Garza Pérez	50	+1 lap	
16	Netherlands	Robert Doornbos	50	+1 lap	+1
17	(South Korea) Korea	Hwang Jin-Woo	50	+1 lap	
Ret	France	Nicolas Prost	37	Spin	
Ret	Italy	Edoardo Piscopo	30	Mechanical	
Ret	Brazil	Felipe Guimarães	13	Mechanical	

== Notes ==
- It was the 34th race weekend (68 starts).
- It was the 6th race in China, and the first at Chengdu Goldenport Circuit.
- It was the first race weekend as main driver for (United States) Marco Andretti, (Netherlands) Robert Doornbos, (France) Nicolas Prost, (New Zealand) Chris van der Drift and (United Kingdom) Danny Watts.
- It was the first race weekend as rookie driver for (Indonesia) Zahir Ali, (Italy) Christian Montanari and (Netherlands) Dennis Retera.
- Records:
  - Adam Carroll, Danny Watts, and (Republic of Ireland) Ireland scored their first pole position.
  - Filipe Albuquerque and Portugal scored their first victory.
  - Adam Carroll and (Republic of Ireland) Ireland scored their first Sprint Race victory.
