= 2008 Zandvoort A1GP round =

2008–09 A1GP of the Netherlands

Race Details
- Race 1 of 7 in the 2008–09 A1 Grand Prix season
- Date: October 5, 2008
- Location: Circuit Park Zandvoort; Zandvoort, Netherlands
- Weather: Wet, Heavy Rain 12°C

Sprint race

Qualifying
- Pole: Netherlands (J.Bleekemolen)
- Time: 1'24.213

Podium
- 1st: Malaysia (Fairuz Fauzy)
- 2nd: New Zealand (Earl Bamber)
- 3rd: France (Loïc Duval)

Fastest Lap
- FL: France (Loïc Duval)
- Time: 1'45.939, (Lap 6)

Feature race

Qualifying
- Pole: Malaysia (Fairuz Fauzy)
- Time: none

Podium
- 1st: France (Loïc Duval)
- 2nd: Malaysia (Fairuz Fauzy)
- 3rd: New Zealand (Earl Bamber)

Fastest Lap
- FL: USA (Charlie Kimball)
- Time: 1'47.115, (Lap 30)

Official Classifications
- PDF Booklet

The 2008–09 A1 Grand Prix of Nations, Netherlands was an A1 Grand Prix race, held at Circuit Park Zandvoort, Zandvoort, Netherlands. It was originally set to be the second race of the 2008–09 A1 Grand Prix season, but a delay in the build schedule of the new chassis forced the race at Mugello to be moved from the season opener. The same build delay meant that only seventeen of the twenty-three A1 teams participated in the race.

This was the first race for (South Korea) A1 Team Korea (Hwang Jin-Woo), A1 Team Monaco (Clivio Piccione), and the new "Powered by Ferrari" A1GP car.

== Drivers and teams ==
On 26 September, an article on the official A1GP website, detailed that a full grid of cars would not be on track at Zandvoort for the race weekend, due to the build schedule delay. It was subsequently confirmed that a maximum of eighteen teams will be racing – Canada, Germany (Michael Ammermüller), (United Kingdom) Great Britain (Danny Watts), India (Narain Karthikeyan) and Mexico (Davíd Garza Pérez) will thus make their season debut at the second round in China. Germany (Michael Ammermüller) did not, in fact, debut until round 5 in South Africa, while Canada did not appear all season.

Subsequently, Team Pakistan revealed that technical issues with their car were compromising the safety of their driver, Adam Khan – and thus, they too delayed the start of their season, leaving 17 teams to race. Like Canada, Pakistan did not appear all season.

As several teams were still arriving as of Saturday morning, and were unable to shake down their cars before the start of the planned sessions, rookie sessions were not held.

Team	Main Driver
Australia	John Martin
Brazil	Felipe Guimarães
Canada	Did Not Participate
China	Ho-Pin Tung
France	Loïc Duval
Germany	Did Not Participate
(United Kingdom) Great Britain	Did Not Participate
India	Did Not Participate
Indonesia	Satrio Hermanto
(Republic of Ireland) Ireland	Adam Carroll
Italy	Fabio Onidi
(South Korea) Korea	Hwang Jin-Woo
Lebanon	Daniel Morad
Malaysia	Fairuz Fauzy
Mexico	Did Not Participate
Monaco	Clivio Piccione
The Netherlands	Jeroen Bleekemolen
New Zealand	Earl Bamber
Pakistan	Did Not Participate
Portugal	Filipe Albuquerque
South Africa	Adrian Zaugg
Switzerland	Neel Jani
(United States) USA	Charlie Kimball

== Qualifying ==
As some teams had only arrived on Saturday morning, the qualifying format was changed for Zandvoort. In place of the usual four fifteen-minute, single-lap sessions, teams were given a one-hour session in which they could complete as many laps as they wished. Those times would set the grid for the Sprint race, while the results from the Sprint race would determine the grid for the Feature race.

The pole position time, set by the Netherlands (Jeroen Bleekemolen) was four seconds quicker than the fastest lap set the previous year in the Lola/Zytek cars. Bleekemolen lined up on pole, 0.316s ahead of (New Zealand) Earl Bamber and 0.338s ahead of (Republic of Ireland) Adam Carroll in third. Both (Brazil) Felipe Guimarães and (China) Ho-Pin Tung failed to set a time.

Sprint race qualifying
Pos	Team	Time	Gap
1	Netherlands	1'24.213	–
2	New Zealand	1'24.529	+0.316
3	(Republic of Ireland) Ireland	1'24.551	+0.338
4	Malaysia	1'24.720	+0.507
5	Monaco	1'25.118	+0.905
6	Switzerland	1'25.524	+1.311
7	South Africa	1'25.928	+1.715
8	Italy	1'25.982	+1.769
9	(United States) USA	1'26.039	+1.826
10	Lebanon	1'26.061	+1.848
11	France	1'26.433	+2.220
12	Australia	1'26.560	+2.347
13	Portugal	1'31.582	+7.369
14	Indonesia	1'31.781	+7.568
15	(South Korea) Korea	1'33.020	+8.807
16	Brazil	no time	–
17	China	no time	–

== Sprint Race ==
Owing to the treacherous conditions, the 12-lap Sprint Race was started behind the Safety Car. The newly introduced mandatory Sprint race pit-stop was removed for this race, to help the teams to conserve equipment.

On Lap 2, the Safety Car pulled in, and the cars were released. On Lap 3, (Republic of Ireland) Adam Carroll spun at the final corner and was hit by (Monaco) Clivio Piccione, forcing both of their retirements. On Lap 3, (Indonesia) Satrio Hermanto also retired after a spin. On Lap 5, (South Korea) Hwang Jin-Woo retired, after colliding with (Australia) John Martin heading into the first corner. Martin managed to continue. On Lap 7, (New Zealand) Earl Bamber passed (Netherlands) Jeroen Bleekemolen for the lead, after a failed passing attempt led to Bleekemolen running wide and allowing Bamber to pass. On Lap 9, (Malaysia) Fairuz Fauzy passed (New Zealand) Bamber for the lead, and then began to build up a lead over the New Zealander. On Lap 11, (China) Ho-Pin Tung spun out of fifth place. On Lap 11, (Brazil) Felipe Guimarães also spun out.

The race was red-flagged on Lap 12, because of the treacherous conditions. (Malaysia) Fauzy won ahead of (New Zealand) Bamber, and (France) Loïc Duval. (France) Duval also set fastest lap.

Pos	Team	Driver	Laps	Time	Points
1	Malaysia	Fairuz Fauzy	12	19'44.533	10
2	New Zealand	Earl Bamber	12	+3.474	8
3	France	Loïc Duval	12	+6.270	6 +1
4	The Netherlands	Jeroen Bleekemolen	12	+13.433	5
5	Switzerland	Neel Jani	12	+16.896	4
6	South Africa	Adrian Zaugg	12	+20.925	3
7	Italy	Fabio Onidi	12	+22.214	2
8	(United States) USA	Charlie Kimball	12	+24.150	1
9	Portugal	Filipe Albuquerque	12	+29.427	
10	Lebanon	Daniel Morad	12	+38.929	
11	Australia	John Martin	12	+1'27.471	
12	China	Ho-Pin Tung	11	Spin	
13	Brazil	Felipe Guimarães	11	Spin	
Ret	(South Korea) Korea	Hwang Jin-Woo	3	Collision	
Ret	Indonesia	Satrio Hermanto	2	Spin	
Ret	(Republic of Ireland) Ireland	Adam Carroll	2	Collision	
Ret	Monaco	Clivio Piccione	1	Collision	

Race stopped after 12 laps because of the terrible conditions

== Feature Race ==
(South Korea) Korea (Hwang Jin-Woo) were sent to the back of the grid for attempting to overtake under a yellow flag, and causing an avoidable collision in the Sprint race.

The second pit-stop window was set to be between Laps 24 and 32. As conditions hadn't improved since earlier, the race was started behind the Safety Car.

The Safety Car pulled in at the end of Lap 2, to get the race underway. On Lap 5, (Switzerland) Neel Jani pulled into the pits and retires, while (Republic of Ireland) Adam Carroll spun out at Turn 6. On Lap 6, (Italy) Fabio Onidi spun and collected (South Africa) Adrian Zaugg, putting both out of the race. After the first set of pit-stops, France (Loïc Duval) led from New Zealand (Earl Bamber) and Portugal (Filipe Albuquerque).

A lot of action took place on Laps 16–17: (Netherlands) Jeroen Bleekemolen pulled into the pits with a steering wheel problem; Indonesia (Satrio Hermanto) crashed out; (South Korea) Korea (Hwang Jin-Woo) spun and rejoined; and Portugal (Filipe Albuquerque) spun and crashed in the final turn. The Safety Car was deployed while the wrecks were cleared. At this point, all remaining cars in the race were guaranteed points-finishes, which means Monaco (Clivio Piccione) and (South Korea) Korea (Hwang Jin-Woo) would score on their debut, and Lebanon (Daniel Morad) would score their first ever points.

On Lap 24, (Lebanon) Daniel Morad did a 360-spin and continues, losing a place to (Australia) John Martin. Meanwhile, Netherlands (Jeroen Bleekemolen) were having gearshifting problems and lost a place to (United States) USA (Charlie Kimball). On Lap 31, (United States) Charlie Kimball retired after running off the track, but not before setting the fastest lap of the race. France (Loïc Duval) still led after the second round of pit-stops.

On Lap 33, the Safety Car was deployed after (Lebanon) Morad lost control and spun into the back of (China) Ho-Pin Tung, sending both cars into the tyre wall at Tarzan corner. At this stage, the race had nearly reached the 69-minute time limit. Two laps later the time expired, and France (Loïc Duval) took the chequered flag behind the safety car, ahead of Malaysia (Fairuz Fauzy), and New Zealand (Earl Bamber).

Brazil (Felipe Guimarães) joined the race late on, after being unable to make the start, as they were unable to repair the damage from their accident in the Sprint race in time.

Pos	Team	Driver	Laps	Time	Points
1	France	Loïc Duval	36	1:11'58.723	15
2	Malaysia	Fairuz Fauzy	36	+2.288	12
3	New Zealand	Earl Bamber	36	+2.709	10
4	Australia	John Martin	36	+6.329	8
5	Netherlands	Jeroen Bleekemolen	36	+8.273	6
6	Monaco	Clivio Piccione	34	+2 laps	5
7	(South Korea) Korea	Hwang Jin-Woo	33	+3 laps	4
8	Lebanon	Daniel Morad	32	Collision	3
9	China	Ho-Pin Tung	31	Collision	2
10	(United States) USA	Charlie Kimball	30	Spin	1 +1
Ret	Portugal	Filipe Albuquerque	15	Accident	
Ret	Indonesia	Satrio Hermanto	12	Accident	
Ret	South Africa	Adrian Zaugg	5	Collision	
Ret	Italy	Fabio Onidi	5	Collision	
NC	Brazil	Felipe Guimarães	5	+ 31 Laps	
Ret	(Republic of Ireland) Ireland	Adam Carroll	4	Spin	
Ret	Switzerland	Neel Jani	4	Mechanical	

Scheduled for 45 laps but stopped earlier because of time limit

== After race ==
At the first practice session, (South Korea) Korea (Hwang Jin-Woo) was warned due to their political insistence which the team put on the car: Dokdo is a territory of Korea. However, they kept running the car with same insistence written in not English but Korean (Hangul) during the race weekend. As a result, the team received a penalty of fine after the race.

== Notes ==
- It was the 33rd race weekend (66 starts).
- It was the 3rd race in the Netherlands, and the 3rd race at Circuit Park Zandvoort.
- It was the first race weekend for (South Korea) A1 Team Korea (Hwang Jin-Woo), and A1 Team Monaco (Clivio Piccione).
- It was the first race weekend as main driver for (New Zealand) Earl Bamber, (Brazil) Felipe Guimarães, (South Korea) Hwang Jin-Woo, (United States) Charlie Kimball, (Lebanon) Daniel Morad, (Italy) Fabio Onidi and (Monaco) Clivio Piccione.
- Records:
  - In the Sprint race, it was the first win for Malaysia and Fairuz Fauzy.
  - Lebanon (Daniel Morad) had participated in 33 rounds (63 starts) before scoring their first points.
  - (South Korea) Korea (Hwang Jin-Woo), Lebanon (Daniel Morad) and Monaco (Clivio Piccione) all scored their first ever points in the series, in the Feature race.
