= A1 Team Korea =

South Korean motor racing team

- Korea
- Founded: 2007
- Seat holder(s): Kim Jung-yong
- Race driver(s): Hwang Jin-woo
- First race: 2008–09 Netherlands
- Rounds entered: 2
- Championships: 0
- Sprint race victories: 0
- Feature race victories: 0
- Pole positions: 0
- Fastest laps: 0
- Total points: 4
- 2008-09 position: 19th (4 pts)

A1 Team Korea was a motor racing team that represented South Korea in A1 Grand Prix.

== History ==
A1 Team Korea's logo

On 13 April 2008, A1 Team Korea was confirmed as an entrant into the 2008–09 A1 Grand Prix season at an official signing session led by Jung-yong "Joshua" Kim of Omnibus Investment and A1 Grand Prix executive director Tony Teixeira. Kim was registered as the seat holder, Carlin Motorsport were tasked with operating the team and 2006 Korean GT champion Hwang Jin-woo was signed as the teams' driver. Korean entertainment company Good EMG sponsored the outfit.

A1 Team Korea were one of seventeen teams to participate in the opening round of the 2008–09 season at Zandvoort, with six sitting out the event as their new cars had not yet been completed (two of those teams, Canada and Pakistan, did not race at all that season). Despite the teams' lack of experience, the smaller field combined with extreme wet-weather allowed them to finish seventh in the feature race, one place behind fellow debutants Monaco. At the following round in Chengdu, Hwang qualified last for both races and was the last classified finisher in the feature race. The team attended the third round at Sepang and turned laps in practice, but did not compete in qualifying or either race due to electrical problems. The team also had to donate parts to cars crashed at the start of the sprint race due to supply shortages.

Having not attended the Taupō round, A1 Team Korea announced that they had sent their "advance team" including new driver Lee Kyung-woo to Kyalami for the fifth round of the championship, however they did not take part in the event. The team did not participate in any other rounds that season, and finished 19th of 21 teams as a result of the 4 points they scored in Zandvoort.

== Complete A1 Grand Prix results ==
(key)

Year	Racing team	Chassis, Engine, Tyres	Drivers	1	2	3	4	5	6	7	8	9	10	11	12	13	14	Points	Rank
2008–09	Carlin Motorsport	Ferrari, Ferrari, Michelin		(Netherlands); NED		(China); CHN		(Malaysia); MLY		(New Zealand); NZL		(South Africa); RSA		(Portugal); POR		(United Kingdom); GBR		4	19th
2008–09	Carlin Motorsport	Ferrari, Ferrari, Michelin		S	F	S	F	S	F	S	F	S	F	S	F	S	F	4	19th
2008–09	Carlin Motorsport	Ferrari, Ferrari, Michelin	Hwang Jin-woo	Ret	7	19	17	DNS	DNS									4	19th
2008–09	Carlin Motorsport	Ferrari, Ferrari, Michelin	Lee Kyung-woo									DNA	DNA					4	19th
