= 2009 Brands Hatch A1GP round =

2008–09 A1GP of Great Britain

Race Details
- Race 7 of 7 in the 2008–09 A1 Grand Prix season
- Date: May 3, 2009
- Location: Brands Hatch; Kent, England
- Weather: Clear, 16°C

Sprint race

Qualifying
- Pole: Ireland (Adam Carroll)
- Time: 1:11.615

Podium
- 1st: Ireland (Adam Carroll)
- 2nd: India (Narain Karthikeyan)
- 3rd: Mexico (Salvador Durán)

Fastest Lap
- FL: Ireland (Adam Carroll)
- Time: 1:12.276, (Lap 8)

Feature race

Qualifying
- Pole: Ireland (Adam Carroll)
- Time: 1:10.902

Podium
- 1st: Ireland (Adam Carroll)
- 2nd: Netherlands (Jeroen Bleekemolen)
- 3rd: Switzerland (Neel Jani)

Fastest Lap
- FL: Australia (John Martin)
- Time: 1:12.698, (Lap 36)

Official Classifications
- PDF Booklet

The 2008–09 A1 Grand Prix of Nations, Great Britain was an A1 Grand Prix race at Brands Hatch, England. It was set to be the final round of the 2008-09 A1 Grand Prix season, but became the season finale, due to the cancellation of the Mexican round due to the 2009 swine flu pandemic. Ultimately, it would be the last race for A1GP as bankruptcy followed later in the year.

A1 Team Ireland became the fourth A1 Grand Prix champions, with a double pole position, and double victory, to take Ireland's first international motor racing championship.

== Title Battle ==
With the British round now becoming the season finale, this left the championship in a three-way battle for the title.

Switzerland lead going into the event with 88 points, with four points to drop; followed by Ireland with 86, and Portugal with 82. The Netherlands are currently too far behind to win the title with 66 points, as even though 27 points are on offer for maximum score, the team has to drop 6 points from their worst event.

Also, even if all the teams finish equal of points, the tie-breaker rules would come into play. Currently Switzerland would win the title with four wins, to Ireland's three, and Portugal's one.

== Drivers ==
Team	Main Driver	Rookie Driver(s)	Reserve Driver
Australia	John Martin		
Brazil	Felipe Guimarães		
Canada	Did Not Participate		
China	Congfu Cheng		Ho-Pin Tung
France	Nicolas Prost	Nicolas Prost	
Germany	Michael Ammermüller		
(United Kingdom) Great Britain	Dan Clarke	Aaron Steele	
India	Narain Karthikeyan	Parthiva Sureshwaren	
Indonesia	Satrio Hermanto		
(Republic of Ireland) Ireland	Adam Carroll	Niall Quinn	
Italy	Vitantonio Liuzzi		
(South Korea) Korea	Did Not Participate		
Lebanon	Daniel Morad	Jimmy Auby	
Malaysia	Aaron Lim		
Mexico	Salvador Durán	Juan Pablo Garcia	
Monaco	Clivio Piccione	Hubertus Bahlsen	
The Netherlands	Jeroen Bleekemolen	Dennis Retera	
New Zealand	Earl Bamber		
Pakistan	Did Not Participate		
Portugal	Filipe Albuquerque		
South Africa	Alan van der Merwe	Cristiano Morgado	
Switzerland	Neel Jani	Alexandre Imperatori	
(United States) USA	J. R. Hildebrand		

== Qualifying ==
Sprint race qualifying
Pos	Team	Time	Gap
1	(Republic of Ireland) Ireland	1:11.615	-
2	Mexico	1:11.653^{†}	+ 0.038
3	Netherlands	1:11.992	+ 0.377
4	(United States) USA	1:11.994^{†}	+ 0.379
5	Portugal	1:12.040^{†}	+ 0.425
6	New Zealand	1:12.108^{†}	+ 0.493
7	India	1:12.109^{†}	+ 0.494
8	Switzerland	1:12.212	+ 0.597
9	Indonesia	1:12.658^{†}	+ 1.043
10	Australia	1:12.745	+ 1.130
11	Lebanon	1:12.889^{†}	+ 1.274
12	France	1:13.011	+ 1.396
13	(United Kingdom) Great Britain	1:13.019	+ 1.404
14	Monaco	1:13.260	+ 1.645
15	Germany	1:13.329	+ 1.714
16	Italy	1:13.549^{†}	+ 1.934
17	Brazil	1:13.584	+ 1.969
18	Malaysia	1:13.686^{†}	+ 2.071
19	South Africa	1:13.854	+ 2.239
20	China	1:13.861	+ 2.246

Feature race qualifying
Pos	Team	Time	Gap
1	(Republic of Ireland) Ireland	1:10.902^{†}	-
2	Monaco	1:11.085^{†}	+ 0.183
3	Netherlands	1:11.146^{†}	+ 0.244
4	Switzerland	1:11.338^{†}	+ 0.436
5	France	1:11.543^{†}	+ 0.641
6	New Zealand	1:11.633	+ 0.731
7	Australia	1:11.930^{†}	+ 1.028
8	China	1:12.180^{†}	+ 1.278
9	Portugal	1:12.270	+ 1.368
10	India	1:12.397	+ 1.495
11	(United States) USA	1:12.662	+ 1.760
12	South Africa	1:12.730^{†}	+ 1.828
13	Mexico	1:12.740	+ 1.838
14	(United Kingdom) Great Britain	1:12.756^{†}	+ 1.854
15	Lebanon	1:12.766	+ 1.864
16	Germany	1:12.797^{†}	+ 1.895
17	Brazil	1:13.048^{†}	+ 2.146
18	Italy	1:13.131	+ 2.229
19	Indonesia	1:13.560	+ 2.658
20	Malaysia	1:14.203	+ 3.301

^{†} Team utilized Powerboost "joker" qualifying lap.

== Sprint Race ==
Pos	Team	Driver	Laps	Time	Points
1	(Republic of Ireland) Ireland	Adam Carroll	18	22:32.704	10+1
2	India	Narain Karthikeyan	18	+ 7.230	8
3	Mexico	Salvador Durán	18	+ 12.340	6
4	(United States) USA	J. R. Hildebrand	18	+ 12.689	5
5	Portugal	Filipe Albuquerque	18	+ 13.018	4
6	Netherlands	Jeroen Bleekemolen	18	+ 13.783	3
7	Australia	John Martin	18	+ 15.208	2
8	Switzerland	Neel Jani	18	+ 22.220	1
9	France	Nicolas Prost	18	+ 22.945	
10	Italy	Vitantonio Liuzzi	18	+ 27.062	
11	Germany	Michael Ammermüller	18	+ 31.947	
12	Indonesia	Satrio Hermanto	18	+ 33.159	
13	(United Kingdom) Great Britain	Dan Clarke	18	+ 33.541	
14	China	Cheng Congfu	18	+ 34.963	
15	South Africa	Alan van der Merwe	18	+ 40.488	
16	Malaysia	Aaron Lim	18	+ 41.528	
17	Lebanon	Daniel Morad	13	Spin	
18	New Zealand	Earl Bamber	13	Spin	
19	Monaco	Clivio Piccione	8	Fire	
20	Brazil	Felipe Guimarães	Did Not Start		

== Feature Race ==
Pos	Team	Driver	Laps	Time	Points
1	(Republic of Ireland) Ireland	Adam Carroll	49	1:04:14.970	15
2	Netherlands	Jeroen Bleekemolen	49	+ 10.156	12
3	Switzerland	Neel Jani	49	+ 13.564	10
4	Monaco	Clivio Piccione	49	+ 14.293	8
5	Portugal	Filipe Albuquerque	49	+ 16.484	6
6	Mexico	Salvador Durán	49	+ 21.810	5
7	(United Kingdom) Great Britain	Dan Clarke	49	+ 23.409	4
8	Australia	John Martin	49	+ 24.493	3+1
9	Italy	Vitantonio Liuzzi	49	+ 46.004	2
10	France	Nicolas Prost	49	+ 49.094	1
11	South Africa	Alan van der Merwe	49	+ 1:13.905	
12	Lebanon	Daniel Morad	49	+ 1:16.257	
13	Indonesia	Satrio Hermanto	48	+ 1 Lap	
14	(United States) USA	J. R. Hildebrand	48	+ 1 Lap	
15	Malaysia	Aaron Lim	27	Spin	
16	Germany	Michael Ammermüller	26	Exhaust	
17	New Zealand	Earl Bamber	6	Spin	
18	India	Narain Karthikeyan	0	Accident	
19	China	Cheng Congfu	0	Collision	
20	Brazil	Felipe Guimarães	Did Not Start		

== Notes ==
- It was the 39th race weekend (78 starts).
- It was the fourth race to be held in Great Britain at Brands Hatch, as well as the third time the track has hosted the season finale.
- It was the first race as main driver for (United States) J. R. Hildebrand and (Malaysia) Aaron Lim.
- It was the first race as rookie driver for (United Kingdom) Aaron Steele.
- (Republic of Ireland) Ireland scored their second double pole-position of the season, and the only double win of the season.
