= Dennis Retera =

Dutch racing driver (born 1986)

- Nationality: (Netherlands) Dutch
- Born: July 11, 1986 (age 40) Best, North Brabant, Netherlands

International GT Open career
- Debut season: 2013
- Current team: V8 Racing
- Categorisation: FIA Silver
- Car number: 72
- Starts: 11
- Championships: 0
- Wins: 0
- Poles: 0
- Fastest laps: 0
- Best finish: 21st in 2014

Previous series
- 2013 2012 2011 2010 2009 2009 2008 2007-2006 2006 2005-2004: European Le Mans Series; Blancpain Endurance Series; Dutch GT4; FIA GT3 European Championship; International Formula Master; BRL V6; GT4 European Series; Formula Renault 2.0 NEC; British Formula Three; Formula Ford Zetec

Championship titles
- 2005 2004: Formula Ford Zetec Benelux; Formula Ford Zetec Benelux - First Division

Dennis Retera (born 11 July 1986 in Best, North Brabant) is a Dutch racing driver currently competing in the International GT Open. Retera has raced in the International Formula Master, Formula Renault 2.0 and other racing series. In 2008, Retera joined A1 Team Netherlands as a test driver.

== Career ==
After a successful karting career with various Rotax Max championships Retera made his car racing debut in the Dutch and Benelux Formula Ford Zetec championships. Retera won both championships in the First Division, for older Formula Ford cars. He finished third in the overall championship for both the Dutch and Benelux series. The following year, Retera signed by the well renowned Geva Racing. This time, Retera won the overall titles of both the Dutch and Benelux championships. The Dutchman also achieved a podium position at the prestigious Formula Ford Festival. After starting from pole position, Retera finished third, behind Duncan Tappy and Charlie Donnelly.

In 2006, Retera raced in a variety of series, most notably the British Formula Three Championship. Retera competed in the first three raceweekends of the series. At Donington Park the Dutchman scored his best result, finishing fifth. Retera also entered the two races of the Formula Renault 2.0 Northern European Cup at TT Circuit Assen retiring from both races. For 2007, Retera returned to the series to compete full-time entered by AR Motorsport. After a promising start with two top-ten finishes, Retera did not achieve any more top ten finishes. The driver from Best ended up twelfth in the final standings.

For 2008, Retera focused on GT racing, more specifically the GT4 European Series. He competed in the Light class in a KTM X-Bow entered by Reiter Engineering. Retera competed eight races of which he won five. He and his teammate, Christopher Haase, finished runner-up in the championship. At the end of the 2008 season, Retera was signed as the official rookie driver for A1 Team Netherlands. Retera drove the Ferrari A1 08 at the Friday practice sessions. Retera's strongest session was at the season finale at Brands Hatch. Retera was classified fourth in the rookie session.

2009 saw Retara racing in his native BRL V6 series. Retera won one race in the Ford Mondeo based stock car racing series. Retera also competed in the International Formula Master for his old team, AR Motorsport. In his second race, at Pau, Retera finished second behind Alessandro Kouzkin. For 2010, he joined Callaway Competition in the FIA GT3 European Championship and ADAC GT Masters. With technical difficulties plaguing the Chevrolet Corvette Z06.R, Retera failed to achieve noticeable results. He turned to his native Dutch GT4 for 2010 with co-driver Jan Joris Verheul in a Rhesus Racing entered Aston Martin Vantage. The Dutchman achieved eight podium finishes throughout the fourteen-race season. Retera was classified fourth in the championship standings.

In 2012, Retera ran part-time schedules in the Blancpain Endurance Series and ADAC GT Masters. For 2014, he returned to full-time racing, in the International GT Open in a Chevrolet Corvette Z06. At the Hungaroring and the Nürburgring, Retera finished third. He was classified 21st in the championship.

== Motorsports results ==
=== Complete Formula Renault 2.0 NEC results ===
(key) (Races in bold indicate pole position) (Races in italics indicate fastest lap)

Year	Entrant	1	2	3	4	5	6	7	8	9	10	11	12	13	14	15	16	DC	Points
2006	AR Motorsport	OSC; 1	OSC; 2	SPA; 1	SPA; 2	NÜR; 1	NÜR; 2	ZAN; 1	ZAN; 2	OSC; 1	OSC; 2	ASS; 1 Ret	ASS; 2 Ret	AND; 1	AND; 2	SAL; 1	SAL; 2	—	0
2007	AR Motorsport	ZAN; 1; 10	ZAN; 2; 6	OSC; 1; 20	OSC; 2; 10	ASS; 1; 11	ASS; 2; 23†	ZOL; 1 Ret	ZOL; 1; 12	NUR; 1; 14	NUR; 2; 23	OSC; 1; 12	OSC; 2; 13	SPA; 1	SPA; 2	HOC; 1	HOC; 2	12th	82

=== Complete A1 Grand Prix results ===
(key) (Races in bold indicate pole position) (Races in italics indicate fastest lap)

Year	Entrant	1	2	3	4	5	6	7	8	9	10	11	12	13	14	DC	Points
2008–09	A1 Team Netherlands	NED; SPR	NED; FEA	CHN; SPR; PO	CHN; FEA; PO	MYS; SPR; PO	MYS; FEA; PO	NZL; SPR; PO	NZL; FEA; PO	RSA; SPR; PO	RSA; FEA; PO	POR; SPR; PO	POR; FEA; PO	GBR; SPR; PO	GBR; FEA; PO	-	-
