= 2009 Taupo A1GP round =

2008–09 A1GP of New Zealand

Race Details
- Race 4 of 7 in the 2008–09 A1 Grand Prix season
- Date: 25 January 2009
- Location: Taupo Motorsport Park; Taupō, New Zealand
- Weather: Clear, 24°C

Sprint race

Qualifying
- Pole: Ireland (Adam Carroll)
- Time: 1:14.507

Podium
- 1st: Ireland (Adam Carroll)
- 2nd: Switzerland (Neel Jani)
- 3rd: Netherlands (Robert Doornbos)

Fastest Lap
- FL: Switzerland (Neel Jani)
- Time: 1:15.021, (Lap 10)

Feature race

Qualifying
- Pole: Ireland (Adam Carroll)
- Time: 1:14.411

Podium
- 1st: Switzerland (Neel Jani)
- 2nd: Ireland (Adam Carroll)
- 3rd: Portugal (Filipe Albuquerque)

Fastest Lap
- FL: Portugal (Filipe Albuquerque)
- Time: 1:14.898, (Lap 30)

Official Classifications
- PDF Booklet

The 2008–09 A1 Grand Prix of Nations, New Zealand was an A1 Grand Prix race held at Taupo Motorsport Park, New Zealand.

== Pre-race ==
The A1 Team Portugal’s sports director, Pedro Chaves has tested the A1GP car at the Autódromo Internacional do Algarve (Portugal) for promotional purposes.

== Drivers ==
Team	Main Driver	Rookie Driver	Reserve Driver
Australia	John Martin	Ashley Walsh	
Brazil	Felipe Guimarães	Felipe Guimarães	
Canada	Did Not Participate		
China	Congfu Cheng	Adderly Fong	Ho-Pin Tung
France	Loïc Duval	Nicolas Prost	
Germany	Did Not Participate		
(United Kingdom) Great Britain	Dan Clarke	James Winslow	
India	Narain Karthikeyan	Parthiva Sureshwaren	
Indonesia	Satrio Hermanto	Zahir Ali	
(Republic of Ireland) Ireland	Adam Carroll	Niall Quinn	
Italy	Edoardo Piscopo		
(South Korea) Korea	Did Not Participate		
Lebanon	Daniel Morad	Daniel Morad	Jimmy Auby
Malaysia	Fairuz Fauzy	Aaron Lim	
Mexico	Salvador Duran	Juan Pablo Garcia	
Monaco	Clivio Piccione	Hubertus Bahlsen	
The Netherlands	Robert Doornbos	Dennis Retera	
New Zealand	Chris van der Drift	Chris van der Drift	Jonny Reid
Pakistan	Did Not Participate		
Portugal	Filipe Albuquerque	António Félix da Costa	
South Africa	Adrian Zaugg	Cristiano Morgado	
Switzerland	Neel Jani	Alexandre Imperatori	
(United States) USA	Marco Andretti	J. R. Hildebrand	

== Qualifying ==
The PowerBoost joker-style qualifying lap was not used for qualifying, with further review being made to determine its use in the following race.

It is the first time in A1GP history that the front row for both the Sprint and the Feature race has been the same since the introduction of the double qualifying sessions.

Sprint race qualifying
Pos	Team	Time	Gap
1	(Republic of Ireland) Ireland	1:14.507	–
2	Netherlands	1:14.772	+ 0.265
3	Portugal	1:14.788	+ 0.281
4	Switzerland	1:15.202	+ 0.695
5	France	1:15.360	+ 0.853
6	New Zealand	1:15.457	+ 0.950
7	Australia	1:15.504	+ 0.997
8	Italy	1:15.614	+ 1.107
9	Malaysia	1:15.710	+ 1.203
10	Lebanon	1:15.839	+ 1.332
11	South Africa	1:15.917	+ 1.410
12	Mexico	1:15.972	+ 1.465
13	Brazil	1:16.074	+ 1.567
14	India	1:16.146	+ 1.639
15	(United Kingdom) Great Britain	1:16.347	+ 1.840
16	Monaco	1:16.424	+ 1.917
17	(United States) USA	1:16.791	+ 2.284
18	China	1:16.885	+ 2.378
19	Indonesia	1:17.266	+ 2.759

Feature race qualifying
Pos	Team	Time	Gap
1	(Republic of Ireland) Ireland	1:14.411	–
2	Netherlands	1:14.676	+ 0.265
3	Portugal	1:14.843	+ 0.432
4	Australia	1:14.976	+ 0.565
5	Switzerland	1:15.043	+ 0.632
6	Malaysia	1:15.246	+ 0.835
7	France	1:15.423	+ 1.012
8	(United States) USA	1:15.527	+ 1.116
9	Lebanon	1:15.587	+ 1.176
10	New Zealand	1:15.622	+ 1.211
11	India	1:15.699	+ 1.288
12	Brazil	1:15.812	+ 1.401
13	Mexico	1:15.892	+ 1.481
14	(United Kingdom) Great Britain	1:15.902	+ 1.491
15	Italy	1:15.942	+ 1.531
16	South Africa	1:16.164	+ 1.753
17	Monaco	1:16.735	+ 2.324
18	Indonesia	1:16.783	+ 2.372
19	China	1:17.184	+ 2.773

== Sprint Race ==
For safety concerns, regarding the "S" bend near the end of the lap, the Sprint Race featured a standing start, rather than the traditional rolling start.

Pos	Team	Driver	Laps	Time	Points
1	(Republic of Ireland) Ireland	Adam Carroll	15	19:40.271	10
2	Switzerland	Neel Jani	15	+ 1.488	8+1
3	Netherlands	Robert Doornbos	15	+ 3.559	6
4	France	Loïc Duval	15	+ 8.594	5
5	New Zealand	Chris van der Drift	15	+ 11.666	4
6	Portugal	Filipe Albuquerque	15	+ 12.665	3
7	Italy	Edoardo Piscopo	15	+ 14.959	2
8	Malaysia	Fairuz Fauzy	15	+ 15.797	1
9	India	Narain Karthikeyan	15	+ 20.973	
10	South Africa	Adrian Zaugg	15	+ 22.030	
11	(United States) USA	Marco Andretti	15	+ 30.565	
12	(United Kingdom) Great Britain	Dan Clarke	15	+ 31.005	
13	Indonesia	Satrio Hermanto	15	+ 32.361	
14	Brazil	Felipe Guimarães	15	+ 33.134	
15	Mexico	Salvador Durán	15	+ 40.601	
16	Monaco	Clivio Piccione	15	+ 49.281*	
17	China	Congfu Cheng	11	Spin	
18	Lebanon	Daniel Morad	8	Accident	
19	Australia	John Martin	5	Suspension	

* 25 second penalty added to time, for causing an avoidable collision

== Feature Race ==
Pos	Team	Driver	Laps	Time	Points
1	Switzerland	Neel Jani	50	1:06'19.574	15
2	(Republic of Ireland) Ireland	Adam Carroll	50	+ 1.047	12
3	Portugal	Filipe Albuquerque	50	+ 2.379	10+1
4	Australia	John Martin	50	+ 10.593	8
5	Netherlands	Robert Doornbos	50	+ 14.402	6
6	France	Loïc Duval	50	+ 17.423	5
7	India	Narain Karthikeyan	50	+ 20.215	4
8	Italy	Edoardo Piscopo	50	+ 23.156	3
9	South Africa	Adrian Zaugg	50	+ 23.347	2
10	Malaysia	Fairuz Fauzy	50	+ 26.832	1
11	(United States) USA	Marco Andretti	50	+ 45.799*	
12	(United Kingdom) Great Britain	Dan Clarke	49	+ 1 lap	
13	New Zealand	Chris van der Drift	49	+ 1 lap	
14	China	Congfu Cheng	49	+ 1 lap	
15	Brazil	Felipe Guimarães	49	+ 1 lap*	
16	Mexico	Salvador Durán	43	Retired	
17	Indonesia	Satrio Hermanto	42	Spin	
18	Monaco	Clivio Piccione	33	Spin	
19	Lebanon	Daniel Morad	1	Suspension	

* 25 second penalty added to time – USA for passing the white line at the end of the pit lane, Brazil for causing an avoidable collision

== Notes ==
- It was the 36th race weekend (72 starts).
- It was the 3rd race in New Zealand, and the 3rd at Taupo Motorsport Park.
- It was the first race as main driver for (United Kingdom) Dan Clarke.
- It was the first race weekend as rookie driver for (Portugal) António Félix da Costa, (Monaco) Hubertus Bahlsen, (China) Adderly Fong and (South Africa) Cristiano Morgado.
- Records:
  - Portugal and Filipe Albuquerque scored their first fastest lap.
  - (Switzerland) Neel Jani tied with (Malaysia) Alex Yoong for the most A1GP starts – 54.
  - (Switzerland) Neel Jani score 8 fastest laps.
