= A1 Team Mexico =

- Mexico
- Founded: 2005
- Seat holder(s): Juan Cortina; Julio Jáuregui.
- Race driver(s): Davíd Garza Pérez
- Car nickname: The Feathered Snake
- First race: 2005-06 Great Britain
- Rounds entered: 32
- Championships: 0
- Sprint race victories: 1
- Feature race victories: 1
- Pole positions: 1
- Fastest laps: 5
- Total points: 116
- 2008-09 position: nc (0 pts)

A1 Team Mexico was the Mexican team of A1 Grand Prix, an international racing series.

== Management ==
A1 Team Mexico owners were Juan Cortina and Julio Jáuregui.

The technical assistance was initially provided by DAMS in 2005-06. However, new regulations brought in for 2006-07 stated that a racing team could not work with more than two A1 Teams. As DAMS worked with A1 Team France and South Africa in 2006–07, Mexico created a bespoke race team named Teamex to replace DAMS. In 2007–08, the team was run by Team Craft, while Escuderia del Mediterraneo took over for 2008–09.

== History ==
=== 2008–09 season ===
Driver: Davíd Garza Pérez

=== 2007–08 season ===
Drivers: Salvador Durán, Davíd Garza Pérez, Jorge Goeters, Michel Jourdain Jr., David Martínez

Team Mexico were relatively uncompetitive in 2007–08. After scoring well in Zandvoort, the team only scored again twice, en route to 16th in the championship.

=== 2006–07 season ===
Drivers: Salvador Durán, Juan Pablo Garcia, David Martínez, Sergio Pérez

Again, mixed fortunes for the Mexican team. Four podiums in the early season, but no points after Indonesia, left them in 10th position in the championship.

=== 2005–06 season ===
Drivers: Luis Diaz, Salvador Durán, David Martínez

Mixed fortunes came over Team Mexico in the inaugural season. A clean sweep of the American rounds and three podiums, brought them to 10th place in the championship.

== Drivers ==
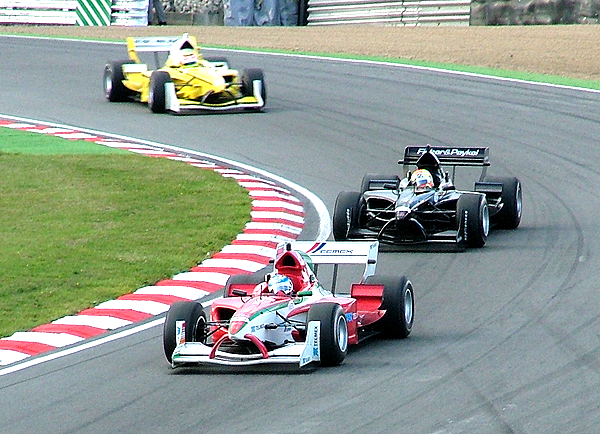
Mexico leads A1 Team New Zealand at the inaugural A1GP

Name	Seasons	Races (Starts)	A1GP Title	Wins	Sprint wins	Main wins	2nd	3rd	Poles	Fastest Laps	Points
Luis Diaz	2005-06	1 (2)									0
Salvador Durán	2005-06, 2006-07, 2007-08	18 (36)		2	1	1	3	4	1	2	107
Juan Pablo Garcia	2006-07	1 (2)									0
Davíd Garza Pérez	2007-08, 2008-09	5 (10)									5
Jorge Goeters	2007-08	1 (2)									0
Michel Jourdain Jr.	2007-08	2 (4)									0
David Martínez	2005-06, 2007-08	3 (6)									4
Sergio Pérez	2006-07	1 (2)									0

== Complete A1 Grand Prix results ==
(key), "spr" indicate a Sprint Race, "fea" indicate a Main Race.

Year	Racing team	Chassis, Engine, Tyres	Drivers	1	2	3	4	5	6	7	8	9	10	11	12	13	14	15	16	17	18	19	20	21	22	Points	Rank
2005-06	DAMS	Lola, Zytek, Cooper Avon		GBR spr	GBR fea	GER spr	GER fea	PRT spr	PRT fea	AUS spr	AUS fea	MYS spr	MYS fea	ARE spr	ARE fea	ZAF spr	ZAF fea	IDN spr	IDN fea	MEX spr	MEX fea	USA spr	USA fea	CHN spr	CHN fea	59	10th
2005-06	DAMS	Lola, Zytek, Cooper Avon	Salvador Durán	6	3			Ret	Ret	Ret	Ret			18	8			3	Ret	Ret	Ret	1	1	3	8	59	10th
2005-06	DAMS	Lola, Zytek, Cooper Avon	David Martínez			8	13									10	Ret									59	10th
2005-06	DAMS	Lola, Zytek, Cooper Avon	Luis Diaz									19	15													59	10th
2006-07	A1 Team Mexico	Lola; Zytek; Cooper Avon		NED spr	NED fea	CZE spr	CZE fea	BEI spr	BEI fea	MYS spr	MYS fea	IDN spr	IDN fea	NZ spr	NZ fea	AUS spr	AUS fea	ZAF spr	ZAF fea	MEX spr	MEX fea	SHA spr	SHA fea	GBR spr	GBR fea	35	10th
2006-07	A1 Team Mexico	Lola; Zytek; Cooper Avon	Salvador Durán	2	5	7	3	2	Ret	11	Ret	2	6	12	Ret	11	15	Ret	Ret	17	Ret					35	10th
2006-07	A1 Team Mexico	Lola; Zytek; Cooper Avon	Sergio Pérez																			15	Ret			35	10th
2006-07	A1 Team Mexico	Lola; Zytek; Cooper Avon	Juan Pablo Garcia																					18	14	35	10th
2007-08	Team Craft	Lola; Zytek; Cooper Avon		NED spr	NED fea	CZE spr	CZE fea	MYS spr	MYS fea	ZHU spr	ZHU fea	NZ spr	NZ fea	AUS spr	AUS fea	ZAF spr	ZAF fea	MEX spr	MEX fea	SHA spr	SHA fea	GBR spr	GBR fea			22	16th
2007-08	Team Craft	Lola; Zytek; Cooper Avon	Salvador Durán	4	4																					22	16th
2007-08	Team Craft	Lola; Zytek; Cooper Avon	Michel Jourdain Jr.			13	22	20	11																	22	16th
2007-08	Team Craft	Lola; Zytek; Cooper Avon	David Garza Perez							16	11	17	9	17	18	8	Ret	16	14							22	16th
2007-08	Team Craft	Lola; Zytek; Cooper Avon	Jorge Goeters																	20	21					22	16th
2007-08	Team Craft	Lola; Zytek; Cooper Avon	David Martínez																			20	16			22	16th
2008-09	Escudería del Mediterráneo	Ferrari, Ferrari, Michelin		(Netherlands) NED		(China) CHN		(Malaysia) MYS		(New Zealand) NZL		(South Africa) RSA		(Portugal) POR		(United Kingdom) GBR										19	13th
2008-09	Escudería del Mediterráneo	Ferrari, Ferrari, Michelin		spr	fea	spr	fea	spr	fea	spr	fea	spr	fea	spr	fea	spr	fea									19	13th
2008-09	Escudería del Mediterráneo	Ferrari, Ferrari, Michelin	David Garza Perez			16	15	14	15																	19	13th
2008-09	Escudería del Mediterráneo	Ferrari, Ferrari, Michelin	Salvador Durán							15	Ret	16	Ret	9	4	3	6									19	13th
