= Hwang Jin-woo =

South Korean racing driver (born 1983)

Hwang Jin-Woo
- Nationality: (South Korea) South Korean
- Born: August 15, 1983 (age 43) South Korea

Super GT (GT300 class) career
- Debut season: 2008
- Car number: 27

Previous series
- 2003 2004–2005 2006–2007: Asian Formula Renault Korea; BAT GT Championship; CJ GT Championship />CJ Superrace Championship

Championship titles
- 2005 2006: BAT GT Championship (GT1); CJ GT Championship (GT1)

Hwang Jin-Woo (Korean: 황진우; Hanja: 黄眞宇; born 15 August 1983) is a South Korean auto racing driver. He won the Korean GT championship in 2005 and 2006 and moved to the Japanese Super GT series in 2008.

In 2008, Hwang also drove the A1 Team Korea car in the 2008–09 A1 Grand Prix season.

Since 2010, Hwang is racing in the South Korea's Superrace championship.
