= A1 Team Germany =

German auto racing team

- Germany
- Founded: 2005
- Seat holder(s): Rolf Beisswanger
- Team principal: Rolf Beisswanger
- Race driver(s): Michael Ammermüller; André Lotterer
- First race: 2005-06 Great Britain
- Rounds entered: 35 (70 races)
- Championships: 1
- Sprint race victories: 4
- Feature race victories: 7
- Pole positions: 4
- Fastest laps: 6
- Total points: 249
- 2008-09 position: NC (0 pts)

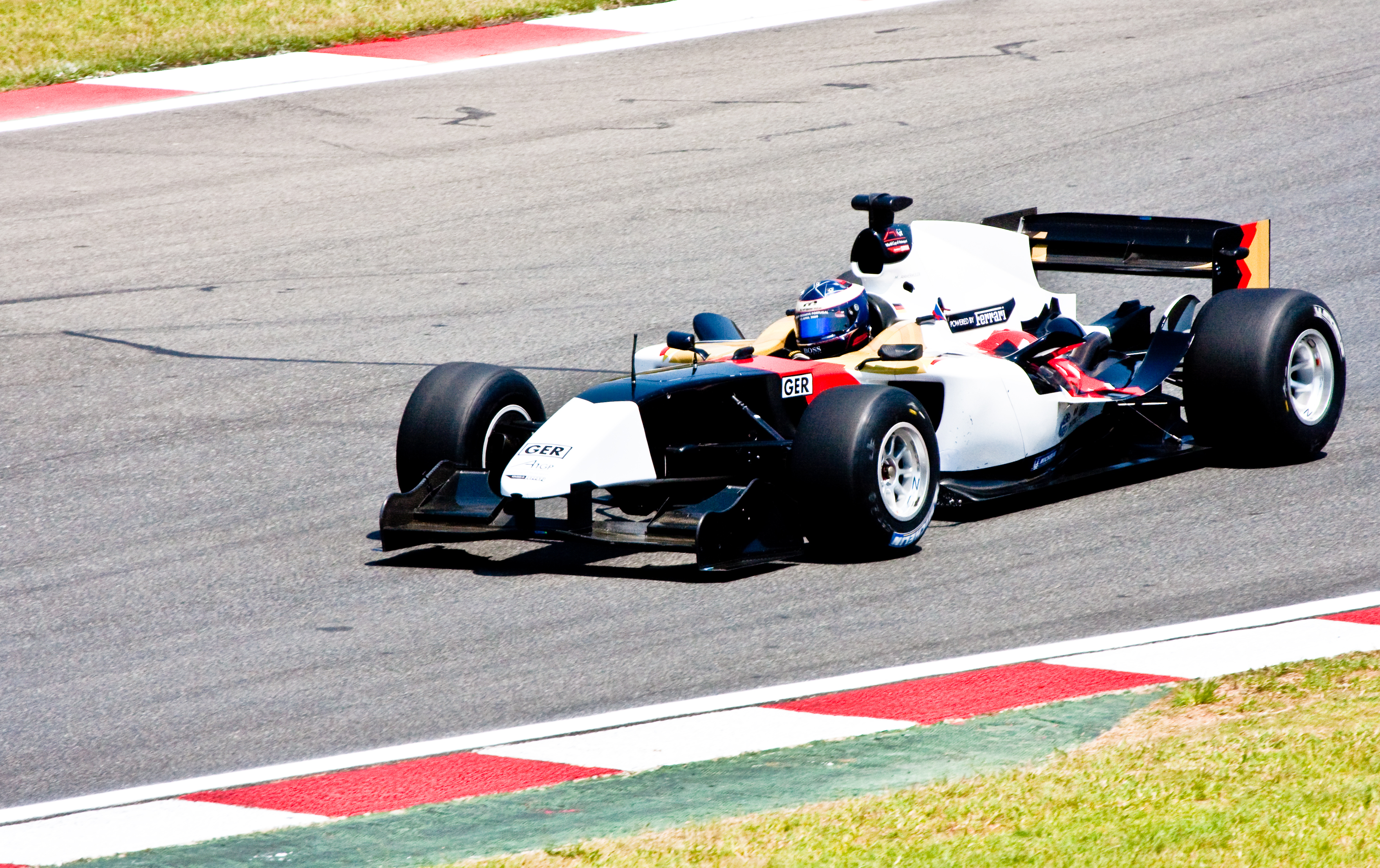
A1 Team Germany

A1 Team Germany was the German team of A1 Grand Prix, an international racing series. The team were the A1 Grand Prix champions for the second season, 2006-07. They were run by the English Super Nova Racing team until the end of 2007-08. GU-Racing took over for 2008-09, but the team missed the first four rounds.

== Management ==
Rolf Beisswanger took over the role of seat holder from Willi Weber, in preparation for 2009.

== History ==
=== 2005–06 season ===
Drivers: Timo Scheider, Sebastian Stahl, Adrian Sutil

The team had a mediocre season, finishing at a disappointing 15th place in the championship.

=== 2006–07 season ===
Drivers: Nico Hülkenberg, Christian Vietoris

Team Germany clinched the A1GP title, with a dominant, and almost singlehanded performance by Nico Hülkenberg, scoring nine victories, and beating nearest rivals New Zealand by 35 points.

=== 2007–08 season ===
Drivers: Michael Ammermüller, Christian Vietoris

Team Germany fell from grace in 2007–08. Although the team won two races, Michael Ammermüller was excluded from two races for his overly aggressive driving style.

=== 2008–09 season ===
Drivers: André Lotterer, Michael Ammermüller

== Drivers ==
Name	Seasons	Races (Starts)	A1GP Title	Wins	Sprint wins	Main wins	2nd	3rd	Poles	Fastest Laps	Points
Michael Ammermüller	2007-08, 2008-09	9 (18)		1	1				1		41
Nico Hülkenberg	2006-07	10 (20)	1	9	3	6	3	2	3	3	126
André Lotterer	2008-09	1 (2)									2
Timo Scheider	2005-06	7 (14)					1				38
Sebastian Stahl	2005-06	1 (2)									0
Adrian Sutil	2005-06	3 (6)									0
Christian Vietoris	2006-07, 2007-08	4 (8)	1	1		1	1			1	44

== Complete A1 Grand Prix results ==
(key), "spr" indicate a Sprint Race, "fea" indicate a Main Race.

Year	Racing team	Chassis, Engine, Tyres	Drivers	1	2	3	4	5	6	7	8	9	10	11	12	13	14	15	16	17	18	19	20	21	22	Points	Rank
2005-06	Super Nova Racing	Lola, Zytek, Cooper Avon		GBR spr	GBR fea	GER spr	GER fea	PRT spr	PRT fea	AUS spr	AUS fea	MYS spr	MYS fea	ARE spr	ARE fea	ZAF spr	ZAF fea	IDN spr	IDN fea	MEX spr	MEX fea	USA spr	USA fea	CHN spr	CHN fea	38	15th
2005-06	Super Nova Racing	Lola, Zytek, Cooper Avon	Timo Scheider	14	10	5	10					12	8			7	Ret	12	12	8	5	7	2			38	15th
2005-06	Super Nova Racing	Lola, Zytek, Cooper Avon	Adrian Sutil					12	Ret	Ret	Ret			Ret	12											38	15th
2005-06	Super Nova Racing	Lola, Zytek, Cooper Avon	Sebastian Stahl																					15	18	38	15th
2006-07	Super Nova Racing	Lola; Zytek; Cooper Avon		NED spr	NED fea	CZE spr	CZE fea	BEI spr	BEI fea	MYS spr	MYS fea	IDN spr	IDN fea	NZ spr	NZ fea	AUS spr	AUS fea	ZAF spr	ZAF fea	MEX spr	MEX fea	SHA spr	SHA fea	GBR spr	GBR fea	128	1st
2006-07	Super Nova Racing	Lola; Zytek; Cooper Avon	Nico Hülkenberg	4	1	Ret	4	5	Ret	2	1	5	2	1	1	1	1	1	1			3	3	2	1	128	1st
2006-07	Super Nova Racing	Lola; Zytek; Cooper Avon	Christian Vietoris																	Ret	9					128	1st
2007-08	Super Nova Racing	Lola; Zytek; Cooper Avon		NED spr	NED fea	CZE spr	CZE fea	MYS spr	MYS fea	ZHU spr	ZHU fea	NZ spr	NZ fea	AUS spr	AUS fea	ZAF spr	ZAF fea	MEX spr	MEX fea	SHA spr	SHA fea	GBR spr	GBR fea			83	8th
2007-08	Super Nova Racing	Lola; Zytek; Cooper Avon	Christian Vietoris	6	9	7	8					2	1													83	8th
2007-08	Super Nova Racing	Lola; Zytek; Cooper Avon	Michael Ammermüller					16	EX	1	4			4	7	EX	Ret	Ret	20	6	10	20	Ret			83	8th
2008-09	GU-Racing International	Ferrari, Ferrari, Michelin		NLD		CHN		MYS		NZL		RSA		POR		GBR										2	21st
2008-09	GU-Racing International	Ferrari, Ferrari, Michelin		spr	fea	spr	fea	spr	fea	spr	fea	spr	fea	spr	fea	spr	fea									2	21st
2008-09	GU-Racing International	Ferrari, Ferrari, Michelin	Michael Ammermüller									14	11			11	Ret									2	21st
2008-09	GU-Racing International	Ferrari, Ferrari, Michelin	André Lotterer											Ret	9											2	21st

Sporting positions
Preceded by France	A1 Grand Prix Champion; 2006-07	Succeeded by Switzerland
