= A1 Team Great Britain =

Sports

- Great Britain
- Founded: 2005
- Seat holder(s): Not known since administration
- Team principal: John Surtees
- Race driver(s): Danny Watts; Dan Clarke
- Car nickname: n/a
- First race: 2005-06 Great Britain
- Rounds entered: 38 (76 races)
- Championships: 0
- Sprint race victories: 2
- Feature race victories: 3
- Pole positions: 5
- Fastest laps: 4
- Total points: 343
- 2008-09 position: 10th (28 pts)

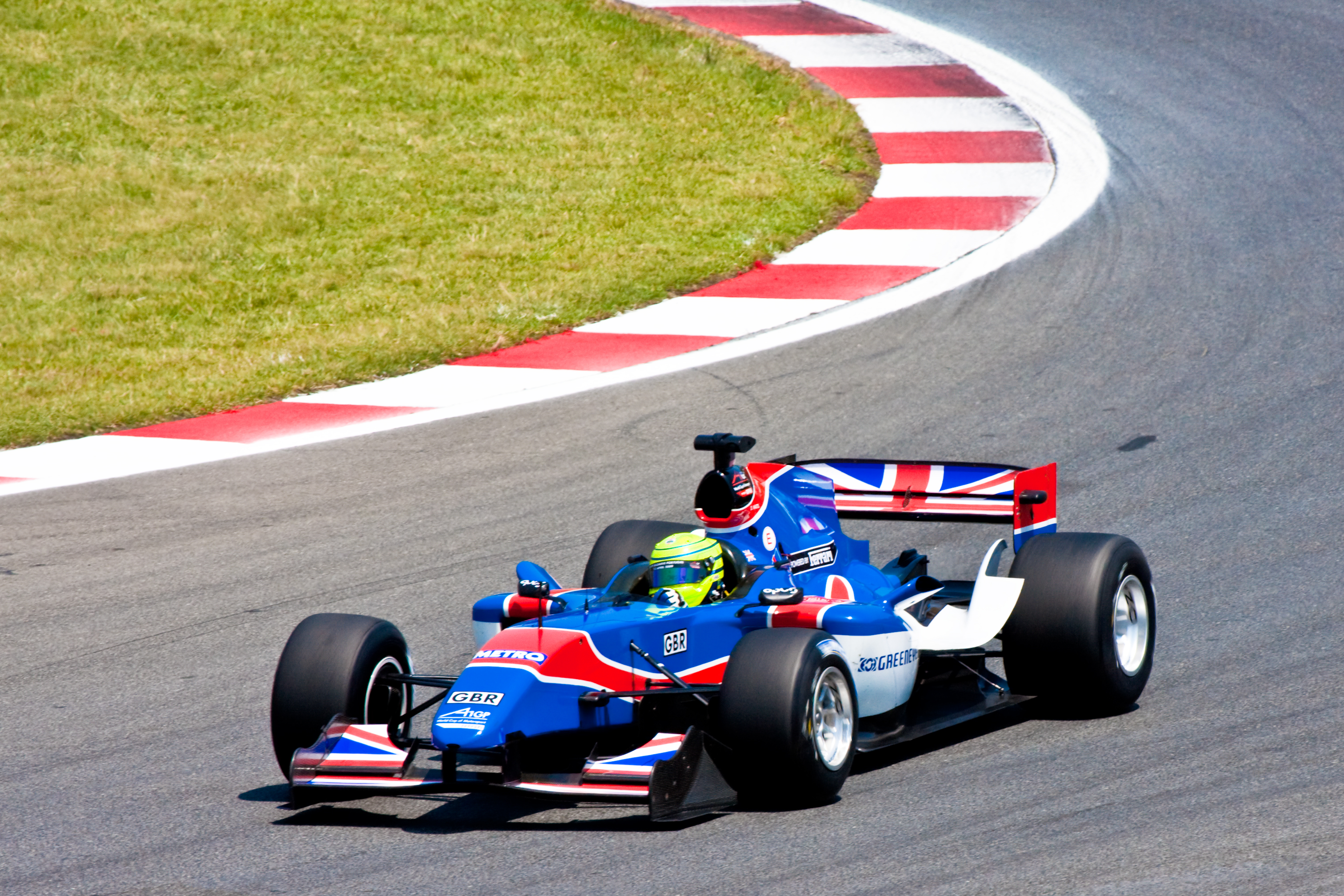
A1 Grand Prix, Kyalami - Great Britain

A1 Team Great Britain was the British team of A1 Grand Prix, an international racing series.

== Management ==
A1 Team Great Britain was one of the first six-seat holders in the series announced, with chairman John Surtees hosting the event. The car was unveiled to the public in September 2005, displaying a distinctive blue, red and white livery to reflect the colours of the flag of the United Kingdom, rather than Britain's traditional racing green colour.

British financier Tony Clements was the national seat holder, and ran the corporate arm of the team until Round 5 of Season 4. Former Formula One and 500cc Motorcycle World Champion John Surtees was the team principal for the first 2 seasons of A1GP, working with the organisational structure, technical development, recruitment and race operations for the team. He quit his role before season 3 and was replaced by Katie Clements. The Arden International racing organisation was responsible for race operations of the team for the first season. However, for season 2 Surtees assembled a bespoke race team to handle the race operations of A1 Team Great Britain. That team stayed in place for the 3rd season of A1GP, and the first 5 rounds of Season 4.

However, between Rounds 5 and 6 of Season 4, A1 Team Great Britain entered administration. From Round 6 onwards, the car was run by mechanics and engineers employed by the series itself, with pit-stops carried out by the German team.

== History ==
=== 2008–09 season ===
Driver: Danny Watts, Dan Clarke

In his first outing for the team at Chengdu, Danny Watts took his first pole position in the Feature Race qualifying.

=== 2007–08 season ===
Drivers: Oliver Jarvis, Robbie Kerr

For the third season running, Team Great Britain finished 3rd in the championship, with two victories and five podiums, including another near-perfect weekend at Brands Hatch.

=== 2006–07 season ===
Drivers: Oliver Jarvis, Robbie Kerr, Darren Manning

Again, Team Great Britain finished third in the overall championship, but accumulated three race victories as well as seven podiums, including a near-perfect weekend in their home race.

=== 2005–06 season ===
Drivers: Robbie Kerr, Darren Manning

A1 Team Great Britain was one of the first six-seat holders in the series announced, with chairman John Surtees hosting the event. The car was unveiled to the public in September 2005, displaying a distinctive blue, red and white livery to reflect the colours of the flag of the United Kingdom, rather than Britain's traditional racing green colour.

Team Great Britain were the first team in the series to offer a testing role to a woman driver. Katherine Legge (who had previously tested a Formula One car for the now-defunct Minardi team), tested at the Dubai Autodrome during the United Arab Emirates race weekend.

The team finished 3rd in the championship, amassing eight podiums.

== Drivers ==
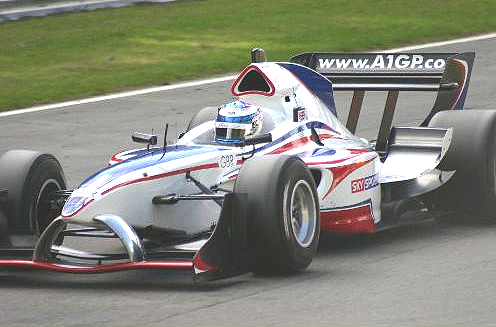
Robbie Kerr negotiates Pilgrim's Drop at Brands Hatch during the 2005-06 curtain raiser.

Name	Seasons	Races (Starts)	A1GP Title	Wins	Sprint wins	Main wins	2nd	3rd	Poles	Fastest Laps	Points
(United Kingdom) Dan Clarke	2008-09	3 (6)									8
(United Kingdom) Oliver Jarvis	2006-07, 2007-08	7 (14)		2		2	5			2	124
(United Kingdom) Robbie Kerr	2005-06, 2006-07, 2007-08	23 (46)		3	3		11	4	4	2	154
(United Kingdom) Darren Manning	2005-06, 2006-07	2 (4)					1				15
(United Kingdom) Danny Watts	2008-09	3 (6)						2	1		20

== Complete A1 Grand Prix results ==
(key), "spr" indicate a Sprint Race, "fea" indicate a Main Race. Results in bold indicate pole position, and results in italics indicate fastest lap.

Year	Racing team	Chassis, Engine, Tyres	Drivers	1	2	3	4	5	6	7	8	9	10	11	12	13	14	15	16	17	18	19	20	21	22	Points	Rank
2005-06	Arden International	Lola, Zytek, Cooper Avon		GBR spr	GBR fea	GER spr	GER fea	PRT spr	PRT fea	AUS spr	AUS fea	MYS spr	MYS fea	ARE spr	ARE fea	ZAF spr	ZAF fea	IDN spr	IDN fea	MEX spr	MEX fea	USA spr	USA fea	CHN spr	CHN fea	97	3rd
2005-06	Arden International	Lola, Zytek, Cooper Avon	Robbie Kerr	5	Ret	Ret	2	Ret	12	5	2	3	Ret	9	2	2	Ret	**2**	10	11	6	4	3			97	3rd
2005-06	Arden International	Lola, Zytek, Cooper Avon	Darren Manning																					2	15	97	3rd
2006-07	A1 Team Great Britain	Lola; Zytek; Cooper Avon		NED spr	NED fea	CZE spr	CZE fea	BEI spr	BEI fea	MYS spr	MYS fea	IDN spr	IDN fea	NZ spr	NZ fea	AUS spr	AUS fea	ZAF spr	ZAF fea	MEX spr	MEX fea	SHA spr	SHA fea	GBR spr	GBR fea	92	3rd
2006-07	A1 Team Great Britain	Lola; Zytek; Cooper Avon	Darren Manning	5	7																					92	3rd
2006-07	A1 Team Great Britain	Lola; Zytek; Cooper Avon	Robbie Kerr			9	6			5	2	3	Ret	8	Ret	19	10	9	2			**1**	2	**1**	2	92	3rd
2006-07	A1 Team Great Britain	Lola; Zytek; Cooper Avon	Oliver Jarvis					7	2											2	1					92	3rd
2007-08	A1 Team Great Britain	Lola; Zytek; Cooper Avon		NED spr	NED fea	CZE spr	CZE fea	MYS spr	MYS fea	ZHU spr	ZHU fea	NZ spr	NZ fea	AUS spr	AUS fea	ZAF spr	ZAF fea	MEX spr	MEX fea	SHA spr	SHA fea	GBR spr	GBR fea			126	3rd
2007-08	A1 Team Great Britain	Lola; Zytek; Cooper Avon	Oliver Jarvis	7	1			6	12	6	5					2	11	2	2							126	3rd
2007-08	A1 Team Great Britain	Lola; Zytek; Cooper Avon	Robbie Kerr			2	17					Ret	Ret	16	3					9	9	1	2			126	3rd
2008-09	A1 Team Great Britain (1-5); GU-Racing International (6-7)	Ferrari, Ferrari, Michelin		(Netherlands) NED		(China) CHN		(Malaysia) MYS		(New Zealand) NZL		(South Africa) RSA		(Portugal) POR		(United Kingdom) GBR										28	10th
2008-09	A1 Team Great Britain (1-5); GU-Racing International (6-7)	Ferrari, Ferrari, Michelin		spr	fea	spr	fea	spr	fea	spr	fea	spr	fea	spr	fea	spr	fea									28	10th
2008-09	A1 Team Great Britain (1-5); GU-Racing International (6-7)	Ferrari, Ferrari, Michelin	Danny Watts			3	**3**	Ret	16			Ret	7													28	10th
2008-09	A1 Team Great Britain (1-5); GU-Racing International (6-7)	Ferrari, Ferrari, Michelin	Dan Clarke							12	12			11	7	13	7									28	10th
