= A1 Team Brazil =

Brazilian racing team (2005-2009)

- Brazil
- Founded: 2005
- Seat holder(s): Emerson Fittipaldi
- Team principal: Fernando Patva
- Race driver(s): Felipe Guimarães
- Car nickname: n/a
- First race: 2005-06 Great Britain
- Rounds entered: 39 (78 races)
- Championships: 0
- Sprint race victories: 1
- Feature race victories: 1
- Pole positions: 2
- Fastest laps: 4
- Total points: 142
- 2008-09 position: 15th (18 pts)

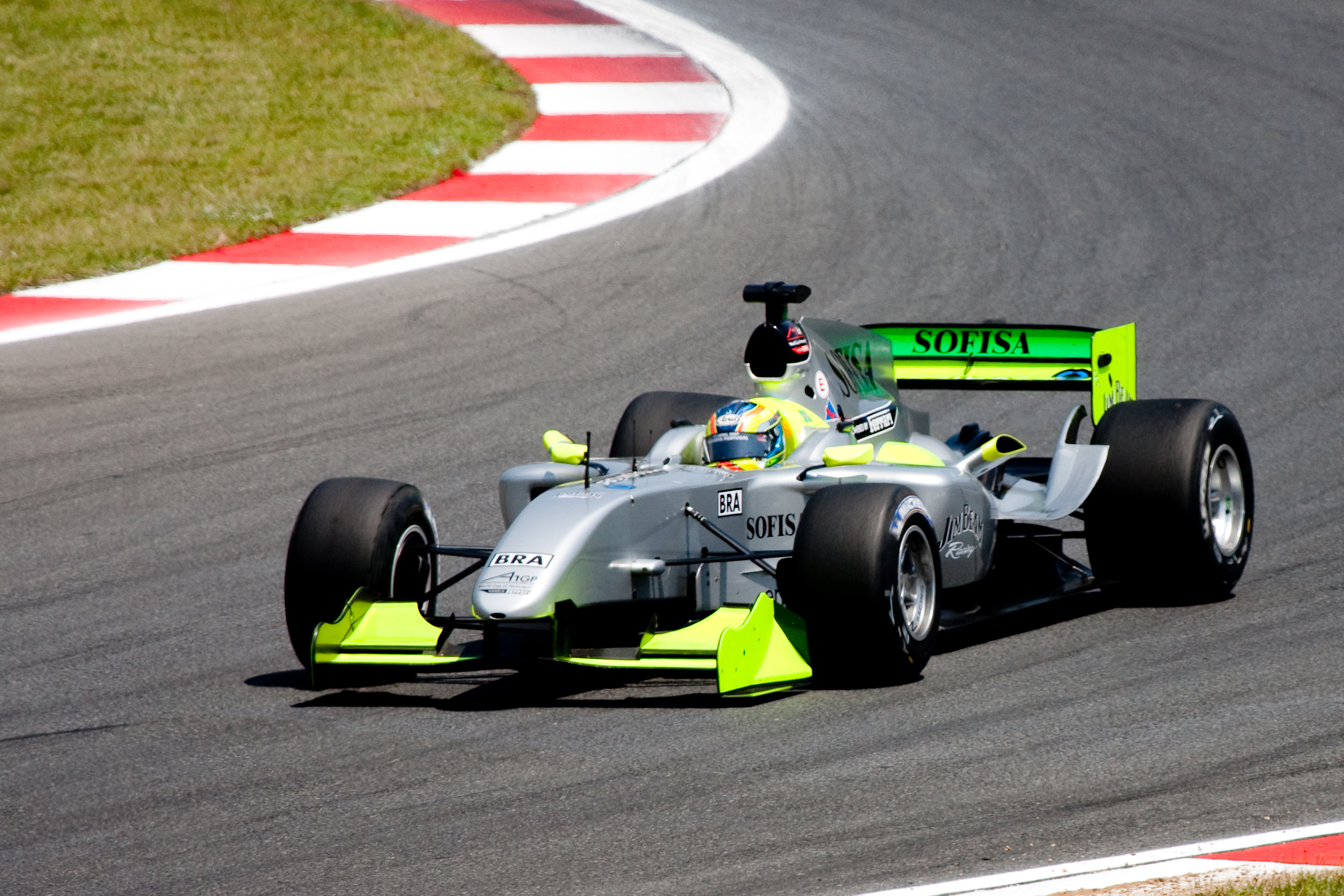
A1 Team Brazil

A1 Team Brazil was the Brazilian team of A1 Grand Prix, an international racing series.

== Management ==
The seat holder for A1 Team Brazil is the former Formula One World Champion Emerson Fittipaldi. Since 2005, Brazilian footballer Ronaldo has been the co-owner of A1 Team Brazil. The team principal is Fernando Paiva. Technical support is provided by DS Motorsport Ltd.

== History ==
=== 2008–09 season ===
Driver: Felipe Guimarães

=== 2007–08 season ===
Drivers: Sérgio Jimenez, Bruno Junqueira, Alexandre Negrão

Performances picked up during the 2007–08 season, with the team scoring a podium in Malaysia, and finishing 11th overall.

=== 2006–07 season ===
Drivers: Bruno Junqueira, Raphael Matos, Vítor Meira, Tuka Rocha

The team suffered a bad season, scoring points in only four races and finishing 18th.

=== 2005–06 season ===
Drivers: Christian Fittipaldi, Nelson Piquet Jr.

After taking maximum points in the opening round of the season, Team Brazil gradually lost competitiveness as the season went on. They finished 6th in the championship.

== Drivers ==
Name	Seasons	Races (Starts)	A1GP Title	Wins	Sprint wins	Main wins	2nd	3rd	Poles	Fastest Laps	Points
Christian Fittipaldi	2005-06	4 (8)									8
Felipe Guimarães	2008-09	7 (11)					1				18
Sérgio Jimenez	2007-08	6 (12)						1			38
Bruno Junqueira	2006-07, 2007-08	5 (10)									10
Raphael Matos	2006-07	3 (6)									5
Vítor Meira	2006-07	1(2)									0
Alexandre Negrão	2007-08	2 (4)									0
Nelson Piquet Jr.	2005-06	7 (14)		2	1	1	1	2	2	3	63
Tuka Rocha	2006-07	4 (8)									0

== Complete A1 Grand Prix results ==
(key), "spr" indicate a Sprint Race, "fea" indicate a Main Race.

Year	Racing team	Chassis, Engine, Tyres	Drivers	1	2	3	4	5	6	7	8	9	10	11	12	13	14	15	16	17	18	19	20	21	22	Points	Rank
2005-06	ASM F3	Lola, Zytek, Cooper Avon		GBR spr	GBR fea	GER spr	GER fea	PRT spr	PRT fea	AUS spr	AUS fea	MYS spr	MYS fea	ARE spr	ARE fea	ZAF spr	ZAF fea	IDN spr	IDN fea	MEX spr	MEX fea	USA spr	USA fea	CHN spr	CHN fea	71	6th
2005-06	ASM F3	Lola, Zytek, Cooper Avon	Nelson Piquet Jr.	1	1	3	Ret	2	8	3	9	4	10	Ret	Ret	Ret	9									71	6th
2005-06	ASM F3	Lola, Zytek, Cooper Avon	Christian Fittipaldi															20	4	14	12	13	Ret	10	Ret	71	6th
2006-07	Charouz Racing System	Lola; Zytek; Cooper Avon		NED spr	NED fea	CZE spr	CZE fea	BEI spr	BEI fea	MYS spr	MYS fea	IDN spr	IDN fea	NZ spr	NZ fea	AUS spr	AUS fea	ZAF spr	ZAF fea	MEX spr	MEX fea	SHA spr	SHA fea	GBR spr	GBR fea	9	18th
2006-07	Charouz Racing System	Lola; Zytek; Cooper Avon	Tuka Rocha	14	12	10	14					15	14			Ret	11									9	18th
2006-07	Charouz Racing System	Lola; Zytek; Cooper Avon	Raphael Matos					6	7	19	18			16	14											9	18th
2006-07	Charouz Racing System	Lola; Zytek; Cooper Avon	Bruno Junqueira															17	7	Ret	13			12	Ret	9	18th
2006-07	Charouz Racing System	Lola; Zytek; Cooper Avon	Vítor Meira																			14	19			9	18th
2007-08	Argo Racing Cars Ltd.	Lola; Zytek; Cooper Avon		NED spr	NED fea	CZE spr	CZE fea	MYS spr	MYS fea	ZHU spr	ZHU fea	NZ spr	NZ fea	AUS spr	AUS fea	ZAF spr	ZAF fea	MEX spr	MEX fea	SHA spr	SHA fea	GBR spr	GBR fea			44	11th
2007-08	Argo Racing Cars Ltd.	Lola; Zytek; Cooper Avon	Sérgio Jimenez	13	11	11	7	4	3	18	Ret	6	13	8	4											44	11th
2007-08	Argo Racing Cars Ltd.	Lola; Zytek; Cooper Avon	Bruno Junqueira													Ret	9	10	8							44	11th
2007-08	Argo Racing Cars Ltd.	Lola; Zytek; Cooper Avon	Alexandre Negrão																	14	13	16	14			44	11th
2008-09	DS Motorsport Ltd	Ferrari, Ferrari, Michelin		(Netherlands) NLD		(China) CHN		(Malaysia) MYS		(New Zealand) NZL		(South Africa) RSA		(Portugal) POR		(United Kingdom) GBR										18	15th
2008-09	DS Motorsport Ltd	Ferrari, Ferrari, Michelin		spr	fea	spr	fea	spr	fea	spr	fea	spr	fea	spr	fea	spr	fea									18	15th
2008-09	DS Motorsport Ltd	Ferrari, Ferrari, Michelin	Felipe Guimarães	14	Ret	20	Ret	Ret	7	14	15	15	2	7	DNS	DNS	DNS									18	15th
