= A1 Team Italy =

Italian motor racing team

- Italy
- Founded: 2005
- Seat holder(s): Piercarlo Ghinzani
- Team principal: -
- Race driver(s): Edoardo Piscopo; Fabio Onidi
- First race: 2005-06 Great Britain
- Rounds entered: 38 (76 races)
- Championships: 0
- Sprint race victories: 0
- Feature race victories: 1
- Pole positions: 0
- Fastest laps: 1
- Total points: 127
- 2008-09 position: 12th (2 pts)

A1 Team Italy was the Italian team of A1 Grand Prix, an international racing series.

== Management ==
A1 Team Italy owner was Piercarlo Ghinzani.

== History ==
=== 2008–09 season ===
Drivers: Edoardo Piscopo, Fabio Onidi. Vitantonio Liuzzi

For the 2008–09 season, Edoardo Piscopo will be returning to drive for the team, and will be joined by Fabio Onidi, a Euroseries 3000 racer. The traditional dark blue livery of the car has also been changed to a red, white and green livery.

=== 2007–08 season ===
Drivers: Edoardo Piscopo, Enrico Toccacelo

Team Italy scored on just five occasions, finishing 18th in the championship with 12 points.

=== 2006–07 season ===
Drivers: Alessandro Pier Guidi, Enrico Toccacelo

The season was moderately successful for the team, with three podiums and a victory, scoring 52 points, and finishing 7th in the championship.

=== 2005–06 season ===
Drivers: Massimiliano Busnelli, Max Papis, Enrico Toccacelo

In the inaugural season, Team Italy scored two podiums en route to 14th place in the championship with 46 points.

== Drivers ==
Name	Seasons	Races (Starts)	A1GP Title	Wins	Sprint wins	Main wins	2nd	3rd	Poles	Fastest Laps	Points
Massimiliano Busnelli	2005-06	2 (4)									0
Alessandro Pier Guidi	2006-07	2 (4)									5
Max Papis	2005-06	1 (2)									4
Fabio Onidi	2008-09	1 (2)									2
Edoardo Piscopo	2007-08, 2008-09	7 (14)									8
Enrico Toccacelo	2005-06, 2006-07, 2007-08	21 (42)		1		1	1	4			26

== Complete A1 Grand Prix results ==
(key), "spr" indicate a Sprint Race, "fea" indicate a Main Race.

Year	Racing team	Chassis, Engine, Tyres	Drivers	1	2	3	4	5	6	7	8	9	10	11	12	13	14	15	16	17	18	19	20	21	22	Points	Rank
2005-06	Team Ghinzani	Lola, Zytek, Cooper Avon		GBR spr	GBR fea	GER spr	GER fea	PRT spr	PRT fea	AUS spr	AUS fea	MYS spr	MYS fea	ARE spr	ARE fea	ZAF spr	ZAF fea	IDN spr	IDN fea	MEX spr	MEX fea	USA spr	USA fea	CHN spr	CHN fea	46	14th
2005-06	Team Ghinzani	Lola, Zytek, Cooper Avon	Enrico Toccacelo	16	Ret	17	Ret	11	7	10	Ret	17	4	2	11					3	5			16	9	46	14th
2005-06	Team Ghinzani	Lola, Zytek, Cooper Avon	Massimiliano Busnelli													Ret	6	14	Ret							46	14th
2005-06	Team Ghinzani	Lola, Zytek, Cooper Avon	Max Papis																			19	7			46	14th
2006-07	Team Ghinzani	Lola; Zytek; Cooper Avon		NED spr	NED fea	CZE spr	CZE fea	BEI spr	BEI fea	MYS spr	MYS fea	IDN spr	IDN fea	NZ spr	NZ fea	AUS spr	AUS fea	ZAF spr	ZAF fea	MEX spr	MEX fea	SHA spr	SHA fea	GBR spr	GBR fea	52	7th
2006-07	Team Ghinzani	Lola; Zytek; Cooper Avon	Alessandro Pier Guidi	Ret	6	14	20																			52	7th
2006-07	Team Ghinzani	Lola; Zytek; Cooper Avon	Enrico Toccacelo					3	1	Ret	13	11	4	9	8	15	12	12	Ret	7	4	10	7	3	3	52	7th
2007-08	Team Ghinzani	Lola; Zytek; Cooper Avon		NED spr	NED fea	CZE spr	CZE fea	MYS spr	MYS fea	ZHU spr	ZHU fea	NZ spr	NZ fea	AUS spr	AUS fea	ZAF spr	ZAF fea	MEX spr	MEX fea	SHA spr	SHA fea	GBR spr	GBR fea			12	18th
2007-08	Team Ghinzani	Lola; Zytek; Cooper Avon	Enrico Toccacelo	12	14	14	10	8	Ret																	12	18th
2007-08	Team Ghinzani	Lola; Zytek; Cooper Avon	Edoardo Piscopo							11	Ret	12	Ret	13	14	14	8	11	Ret	8	12	17	9			12	18th
2008-09	Team Ghinzani	Ferrari, Ferrari, Michelin		(Netherlands) NED		(China) CHN		(Malaysia) MYS		(New Zealand) NZL		(South Africa) RSA		(Portugal) POR		(United Kingdom) GBR										17	16th
2008-09	Team Ghinzani	Ferrari, Ferrari, Michelin		spr	fea	spr	fea	spr	fea	spr	fea	spr	fea	spr	fea	spr	fea									17	16th
2008-09	Team Ghinzani	Ferrari, Ferrari, Michelin	Fabio Onidi	7	Ret																					17	16th
2008-09	Team Ghinzani	Ferrari, Ferrari, Michelin	Edoardo Piscopo			17	Ret	7	11	7	8	11	10													17	16th
2008-09	Team Ghinzani	Ferrari, Ferrari, Michelin	Vitantonio Liuzzi											4	Ret	10	9									17	16th
