= A1 Team USA =

Car racing team

- United States
- Founded: 2005
- Seat holder(s): Rick Weidinger
- Race driver(s): Marco Andretti; Charlie Kimball
- First race: 2005-06 Great Britain
- Rounds entered: 33
- Championships: 0
- Sprint race victories: 0
- Feature race victories: 1
- Pole positions: 0
- Fastest laps: 1
- Total points: 124
- 2008-09 position: 10th (3 pts)

A1 Team USA was the American team of A1 Grand Prix, an international racing series.

== Management ==
Owner Rick Weidinger became interested in A1 Team USA and the A1 Grand Prix series when national franchises were being bid for the new series. Along with minority partners and friends Rusty Lewis and Bill Dean, Weidinger finalized the franchise acquisition in July 2005. The engineering side of the team was originally run by British squads David Price Racing, and then West Surrey Racing. For 2008–2009 the team was run by IndyCar Series team Andretti Green Racing and Andretti Green's IndyCar drivers, primarily Marco Andretti drove the majority of races.

== History ==
=== 2008–09 season ===
Driver: Marco Andretti, Charlie Kimball, J. R. Hildebrand

2008-09 marked the first season in which Andretti Green Racing ran Team USA. Following the Zandvoort race, it was announced that Marco Andretti and Danica Patrick would race for Team USA at some point during the season.

=== 2007–08 season ===
Drivers: Buddy Rice, Jonathan Summerton

After a slow start to the season, Team USA gradually improved, peaking with the team's first victory. Along with 2 podiums, the team finished 12th in the championship.

=== 2006–07 season ===
Drivers: Phil Giebler, Ryan Hunter-Reay

Team USA scored two podiums, and other consistent scoring to finish in 9th place in the championship.

=== 2005–06 season ===
Drivers: Bryan Herta, Phil Giebler, Scott Speed

In the inaugural season, Team USA finished in 16th place in the championship.

=== 2006 Indianapolis 500 entry ===
Wanting to continue the momentum of A1 Team USA and pursue the idea of celebrating American open-wheel racing, team owner Rick Weidinger decided to take the We The People livery to the 90th running of the Indianapolis 500. American racing icon Al Unser Jr. returned from retirement to join the effort. Al, along with his father and uncle, hold 9 Indianapolis 500 victories to their credit; 2 of those belonging to Al Jr. in 1992 and 1994. The 2006 Indy 500 was Al's 18th Indy start.

With operational structure provided by Dreyer & Reinbold Racing, A1 Team USA brought U.S. insurance giant GEICO to complete the American effort as the primary sponsorship partner. With everything in place, Al Unser Jr. took the We The People car out for its maiden laps around the historic Indianapolis Motor Speedway on May 7, 2006. At the 2006 Indianapolis 500, "Little Al" qualified 27th of 33 cars, and was able to move up the field and race in the top half of the pack for most of the race. However, a crash ended his day, finishing 24th with 145 laps completed.

== Drivers ==
Name	Seasons	Races (Starts)	A1GP Title	Wins	Sprint wins	Main wins	2nd	3rd	Poles	Fastest Laps	Points
Marco Andretti	2008-09	2 (4)						1			13
Phil Giebler	2005-06, 2006-07	10 (20)					1				27
Bryan Herta	2005-06	3 (6)									13
Ryan Hunter-Reay	2006-07	1 (2)									1
Charlie Kimball	2008-09	1 (2)								1	3
Buddy Rice	2007-08	2 (4)									0
Scott Speed	2005-06	3 (6)									7
Jonathan Summerton	2006-07, 2007-08	12 (24)		1		1	2	1			74

== Complete A1 Grand Prix results ==
Year	Racing team	Chassis, Engine, Tyres	Drivers	1	2	3	4	5	6	7	8	9	10	11	12	13	14	15	16	17	18	19	20	21	22	Points	Rank
2005-06	David Price Racing	Lola, Zytek, Cooper Avon		GBR spr	GBR fea	GER spr	GER fea	PRT spr	PRT fea	AUS spr	AUS fea	MYS spr	MYS fea	ARE spr	ARE fea	ZAF spr	ZAF fea	IDN spr	IDN fea	MEX spr	MEX fea	USA spr	USA fea	CHN spr	CHN fea	23	16th
2005-06	David Price Racing	Lola, Zytek, Cooper Avon	Scott Speed	11	Ret	Ret	Ret	13	4																	23	16th
2005-06	David Price Racing	Lola, Zytek, Cooper Avon	Bryan Herta							15	10	10	7							6	13	9	Ret			23	16th
2005-06	David Price Racing	Lola, Zytek, Cooper Avon	Philip Giebler											13	Ret	13	Ret	15	9					14	10	23	16th
2006-07	West Surrey Racing	Lola; Zytek; Cooper Avon		NED spr	NED fea	CZE spr	CZE fea	BEI spr	BEI fea	MYS spr	MYS fea	IDN spr	IDN fea	NZ spr	NZ fea	AUS spr	AUS fea	ZAF spr	ZAF fea	MEX spr	MEX fea	SHA spr	SHA fea	GBR spr	GBR fea	42	9th
2006-07	West Surrey Racing	Lola; Zytek; Cooper Avon	Philip Giebler	7	2	6	17	11	Ret	9	6	4	9			8	8									42	9th
2006-07	West Surrey Racing	Lola; Zytek; Cooper Avon	Ryan Hunter-Reay											11	10											42	9th
2006-07	West Surrey Racing	Lola; Zytek; Cooper Avon	Jonathan Summerton															Ret	Ret	5	2	5	Ret	9	6	42	9th
2007-08	A1 Team USA	Lola; Zytek; Cooper Avon		NED spr	NED fea	CZE spr	CZE fea	MYS spr	MYS fea	ZHU spr	ZHU fea	NZ spr	NZ fea	AUS spr	AUS fea	ZAF spr	ZAF fea	MEX spr	MEX fea	SHA spr	SHA fea	GBR spr	GBR fea			56	12th
2007-08	A1 Team USA	Lola; Zytek; Cooper Avon	Buddy Rice	22	13	16	15																			56	12th
2007-08	A1 Team USA	Lola; Zytek; Cooper Avon	Jonathan Summerton					12	10	12	10	7	14	5	Ret	10	Ret	5	3	21	1	2	12			56	12th
2008-09	Andretti Green Racing	Ferrari, Ferrari, Michelin		(Netherlands) NED		(China) CHN		(Malaysia) MYS		(New Zealand) NZL		(South Africa) RSA		(Portugal) POR		(United Kingdom) GBR										24	11th
2008-09	Andretti Green Racing	Ferrari, Ferrari, Michelin		spr	fea	spr	fea	spr	fea	spr	fea	spr	fea	spr	fea	spr	fea									24	11th
2008-09	Andretti Green Racing	Ferrari, Ferrari, Michelin	Charlie Kimball	8	10																					24	11th
2008-09	Andretti Green Racing	Ferrari, Ferrari, Michelin	Marco Andretti			15	8	Ret	3	11	11	17	8	12	Ret											24	11th
2008-09	Andretti Green Racing	Ferrari, Ferrari, Michelin	J. R. Hildebrand													4	14									24	11th

(key), "spr" indicate a Sprint Race, "fea" indicate a Main Race.
