= A1 Team France =

Motor racing team

- France
- Founded: 2005
- Seat holder(s): Jean-Paul Driot
- Team principal: -
- Race driver(s): Loïc Duval; Nicolas Prost
- Car nickname: n/a
- First race: 2005-06 Great Britain
- Rounds entered: 39 (78 races)
- Championships: 1
- Sprint race victories: 8
- Feature race victories: 7
- Pole positions: 6
- Fastest laps: 11
- Total points: 404
- 2008-09 position: 5th (48 pts)

A1 Team France was the French team of A1 Grand Prix, an international racing series. The team were the A1 Grand Prix champions for the inaugural season, 2005-06.

== Management ==
A1 Team France's owner was Jean-Paul Driot. The team was previously managed by Driot's racing team Driot Associates Motor Sport (DAMS) since the series debut, but has switched to Connor Racing for the 2008–09 season.

== History ==
=== 2008–09 season ===
Driver: Loïc Duval

=== 2007–08 season ===
Drivers: Jonathan Cochet, Loïc Duval, Nicolas Lapierre, Franck Montagny

Team France remained competitive during 2007–08, with a win and six podiums leaving them in 4th position overall.

=== 2006–07 season ===
Drivers: Loïc Duval, Nicolas Lapierre, Jean Karl Vernay

Team France fell from grace in 2006–07, however still managed to score seven podiums to finish 4th in the championship.

=== 2005–06 season ===
Drivers: Nicolas Lapierre, Alexandre Premat

Team France were the dominant force during the inaugural season, winning thirteen of the 22 rounds, and becoming runaway champions.

== Drivers ==
| Name | Seasons | Races (Starts) | A1GP Title | Wins | Sprint wins | Main wins | 2nd | 3rd | Poles | Fastest Laps | Points |
|---|---|---|---|---|---|---|---|---|---|---|---|
| Jonathan Cochet | 2007-08 | 1 (2) | | | | | | | | | 0 |
| Loïc Duval | 2006-07, 2007-08, 2008-09 | 13 (26) | | 2 | 1 | 1 | 8 | 4 | 2 | 2 | 167 |
| Nicolas Lapierre | 2005-06, 2006-07, 2007-08 | 11 (22) | 1 | 6 | 3 | 3 | 1 | 4 | 2 | 2 | 117 |
| Franck Montagny | 2007-08 | 2 (4) | | | | | | | | | 10 |
| Alexandre Premat | 2005-06 | 6 (12) | 1 | 7 | 4 | 3 | 1 | | 2 | 3 | 94 |
| Nicolas Prost | 2008-09 | 4 (8) | | | | | | | | | 7 |
| Jean Karl Vernay | 2006-07 | 2 (4) | | | | | | | | | 4 |

== Complete A1 Grand Prix results ==
(key), "spr" indicate a Sprint Race, "fea" indicate a Main Race.

| Year | Racing team | Chassis, Engine, Tyres | Drivers | 1 | 2 | 3 | 4 | 5 | 6 | 7 | 8 | 9 | 10 | 11 | 12 | 13 | 14 | 15 | 16 | 17 | 18 | 19 | 20 | 21 | 22 | Points | Rank |
|---|---|---|---|---|---|---|---|---|---|---|---|---|---|---|---|---|---|---|---|---|---|---|---|---|---|---|---|
| 2005-06 | DAMS | Lola, Zytek, Cooper Avon | | GBR spr | GBR fea | GER spr | GER fea | PRT spr | PRT fea | AUS spr | AUS fea | MYS spr | MYS fea | ARE spr | ARE fea | ZAF spr | ZAF fea | IDN spr | IDN fea | MEX spr | MEX fea | USA spr | USA fea | CHN spr | CHN fea | 172 | 1st |
| 2005-06 | DAMS | Lola, Zytek, Cooper Avon | Alexandre Premat | 2 | (DNS) | | | 1 | 1 | | | 1 | 1 | | | 1 | 8 | | | 1 | 1 | | | 7 | 6 | 172 | 1st |
| 2005-06 | DAMS | Lola, Zytek, Cooper Avon | Nicolas Lapierre | | | 1 | 1 | | | 1 | 1 | | | 7 | 1 | | | 1 | 8 | | | 2 | Ret | | | 172 | 1st |
| 2006-07 | DAMS | Lola; Zytek; Cooper Avon | | NED spr | NED fea | CZE spr | CZE fea | BEI spr | BEI fea | MYS spr | MYS fea | IDN spr | IDN fea | NZ spr | NZ fea | AUS spr | AUS fea | ZAF spr | ZAF fea | MEX spr | MEX fea | SHA spr | SHA fea | GBR spr | GBR fea | 67 | 4th |
| 2006-07 | DAMS | Lola; Zytek; Cooper Avon | Nicolas Lapierre | 3 | Ret | 3 | Ret | 17 | 4 | 6 | 3 | 7 | 3 | | | | | | | | | | | | | 67 | 4th |
| 2006-07 | DAMS | Lola; Zytek; Cooper Avon | Loïc Duval | | | | | | | | | | | 2 | 2 | 3 | 9 | 2 | Ret | | | | | 4 | 7 | 67 | 4th |
| 2006-07 | DAMS | Lola; Zytek; Cooper Avon | Jean Karl Vernay | | | | | | | | | | | | | | | | | Ret | 20 | Ret | 8 | | | 67 | 4th |
| 2007-08 | DAMS | Lola; Zytek; Cooper Avon | | NED spr | NED fea | CZE spr | CZE fea | MYS spr | MYS fea | ZHU spr | ZHU fea | NZ spr | NZ fea | AUS spr | AUS fea | ZAF spr | ZAF fea | MEX spr | MEX fea | SHA spr | SHA fea | GBR spr | GBR fea | | | 118 | 4th |
| 2007-08 | DAMS | Lola; Zytek; Cooper Avon | Loïc Duval | 2 | 5 | | | 2 | 2 | 8 | 7 | 3 | 3 | 1 | Ret | 11 | 2 | | | | | | | | | 118 | 4th |
| 2007-08 | DAMS | Lola; Zytek; Cooper Avon | Nicolas Lapierre | | | 6 | 5 | | | | | | | | | | | | | | | | | | | 118 | 4th |
| 2007-08 | DAMS | Lola; Zytek; Cooper Avon | Jonathan Cochet | | | | | | | | | | | | | | | 12 | 13 | | | | | | | 118 | 4th |
| 2007-08 | DAMS | Lola; Zytek; Cooper Avon | Franck Montagny | | | | | | | | | | | | | | | | | 12 | 8 | 10 | 5 | | | 118 | 4th |
| 2008-09 | DAMS | Ferrari, Ferrari, Michelin | | NLD | | CHN | | MYS | | NZL | | RSA | | POR | | GBR | | | | | | | | | | 47 | 5th |
| 2008-09 | DAMS | Ferrari, Ferrari, Michelin | | spr | fea | spr | fea | spr | fea | spr | fea | spr | fea | spr | fea | spr | fea | | | | | | | | | 47 | 5th |
| 2008-09 | DAMS | Ferrari, Ferrari, Michelin | Loïc Duval | 3 | 1 | | | 2 | 14 | 4 | 6 | | | | | | | | | | | | | | | 47 | 5th |
| 2008-09 | DAMS | Ferrari, Ferrari, Michelin | Nicolas Prost | | | 8 | Ret | | | | | 10 | Ret | 13 | 6 | 9 | 10 | | | | | | | | | 47 | 5th |

Sporting positions
| New sporting event | A1 Grand Prix Champion; 2005-06 | Succeeded by Germany |
