= Renger van der Zande =

Dutch racing driver (born 1986)

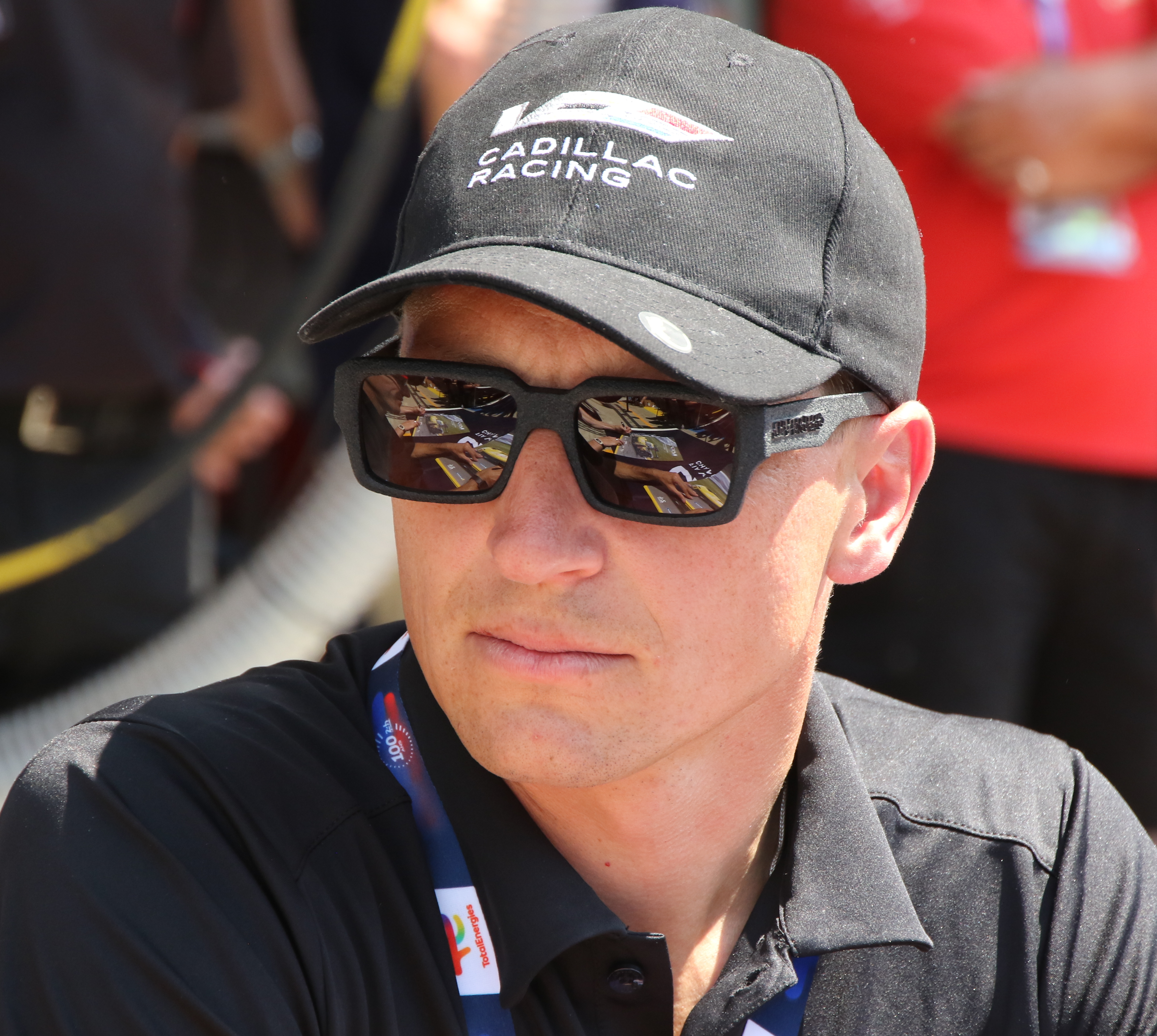
- Van der Zande in 2023
- Nationality: (Netherlands) Dutch
- Born: Renger Adriaan van der Zande; 16 February 1986 (age 40) Dodewaard, Netherlands

IMSA WeatherTech SportsCar Championship career
- Debut season: 2014
- Current team: Acura Meyer Shank Racing w/Curb-Agajanian
- Categorisation: FIA Gold (until 2022); FIA Platinum (2023–)
- Car number: 93
- Former teams: Mishumotors, Starworks Motorsport, Wayne Taylor Racing, Tower Motorsports, Chip Ganassi Racing
- Starts: 127
- Wins: 23
- Poles: 15
- Fastest laps: 21

Previous series
- 2013 2012 2011 2007–10 2009 2008–09 2006–07 2006 2004–05 2004–05: American Le Mans Series, BRL V6, International GT Open; World Endurance Championship, Porsche Supercup; DTM; Formula 3 Euro Series; British Formula 3 GP2 Asia Series; A1 Grand Prix; German Formula Three; FR2.0 Germany; FR2.0 Netherlands

Championship titles
- 2005 2013 2016: FR2.0 Netherlands; BRL V6; IMSA WeatherTech SportsCar Championship

Renger Adriaan van der Zande (Dutch pronunciation: [ˈrɛŋər vɑn dər ˈzɑndə]; born 16 February 1986) is a Dutch racing driver who currently competes for Acura Meyer Shank Racing in the 2025 IMSA SportsCar Championship and for United Autosports in the 2025 24 Hours of Le Mans. He is the son of the 1978 National Dutch Rallycross Champion Ronald van der Zande. In 2016, van der Zande won his first major sports car championship with co-driver Alex Popow and Starworks Motorsport in the WeatherTech SportsCar Championship PC Class. He resides in Amsterdam with his partner Carlijn and their daughter.

== Career ==
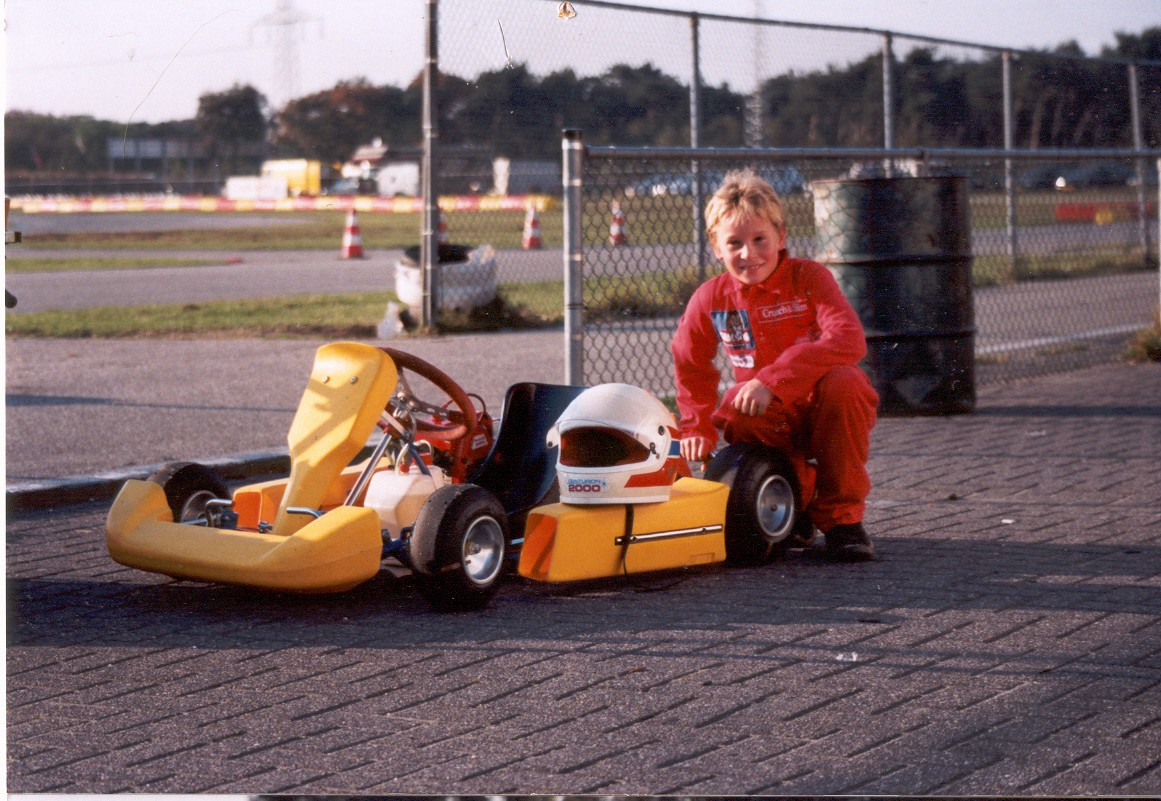
Van der Zande in 1998 with his first go kart

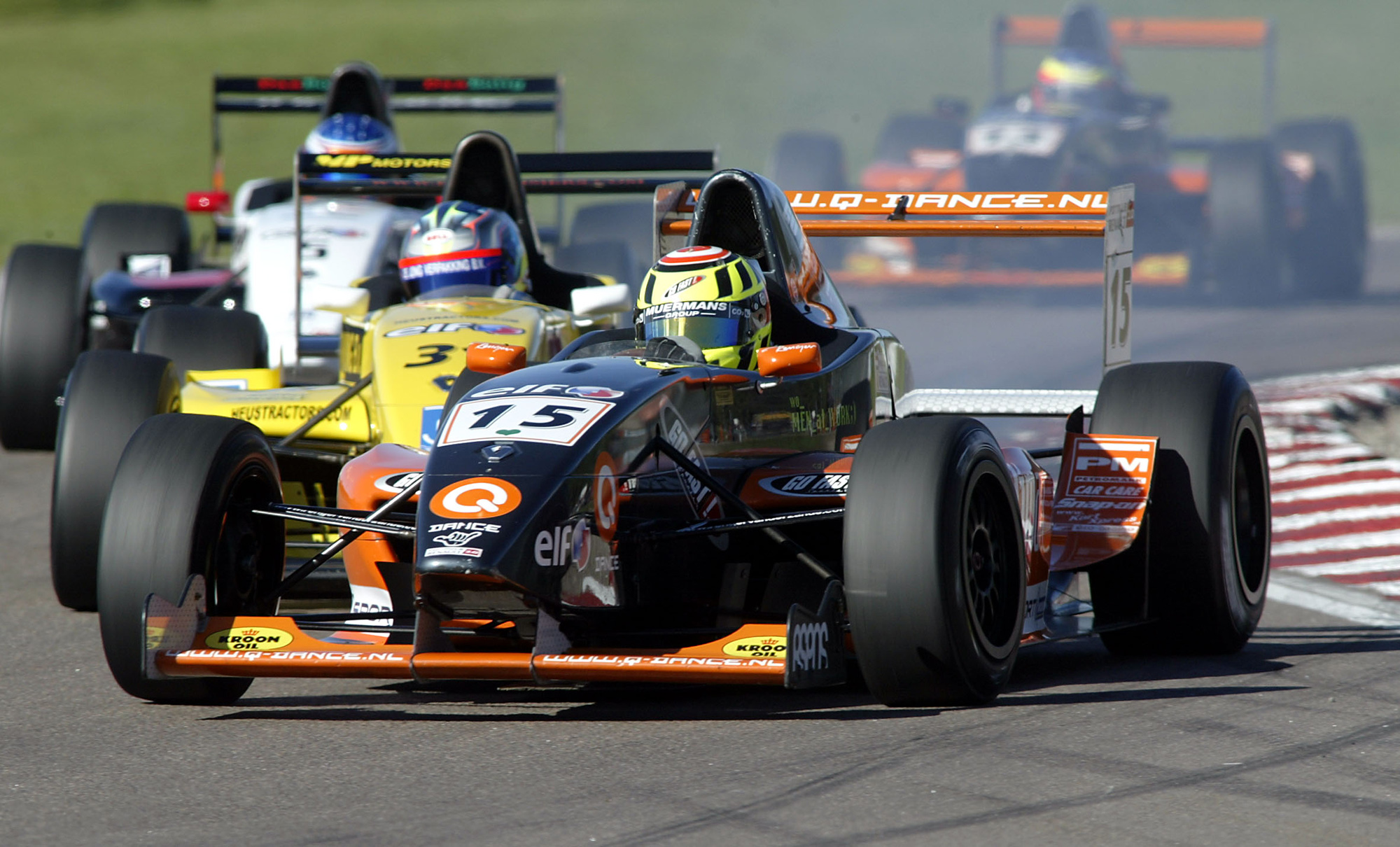
Van der Zande in 2005

Having won the 2005 Formula Renault 2000 Netherlands championship with Van Amersfoort Racing, van der Zande drove three races for the A1GP Netherlands team in the 2006–07 season. He raced for the Prema Powerteam in the Formula Three Euroseries in 2007 and 2008, and made his GP2 Series début by competing in the second round of the 2008–09 GP2 Asia Series season for Trust Team Arden, where he replaced Mika Mäki. However, he was himself replaced by Euroseries rival Edoardo Mortara for the third round in Bahrain.

Having not acquired the budget for a GP2 campaign, van der Zande moved into the British Formula 3 Championship, competing for Hitech Racing. On his debut, he won the first race at Silverstone. He returned to the Euroseries midway through the season, as Atte Mustonen had to pull out of the Oschersleben rounds due to health problems. He returned in Barcelona, again replacing Mustonen at Motopark. This was due to the fact that Daniel Ricciardo had sealed the 2009 British F3 title, before the final round. Hitech teammate Walter Grubmüller overhauled his points tally, and finished as runner-up in the title race. After scoring a point in the first race in Barcelona, van der Zande won the second race from pole position.

In 2010, van der Zande joined RSC Mücke Motorsport for the debut season of the GP3 series, the feeder series for the GP2 Series, earning one podium finish. He also competed in the Windsor Arch F3 Macau Grand Prix with Team Motopark Academy, finishing fifth.

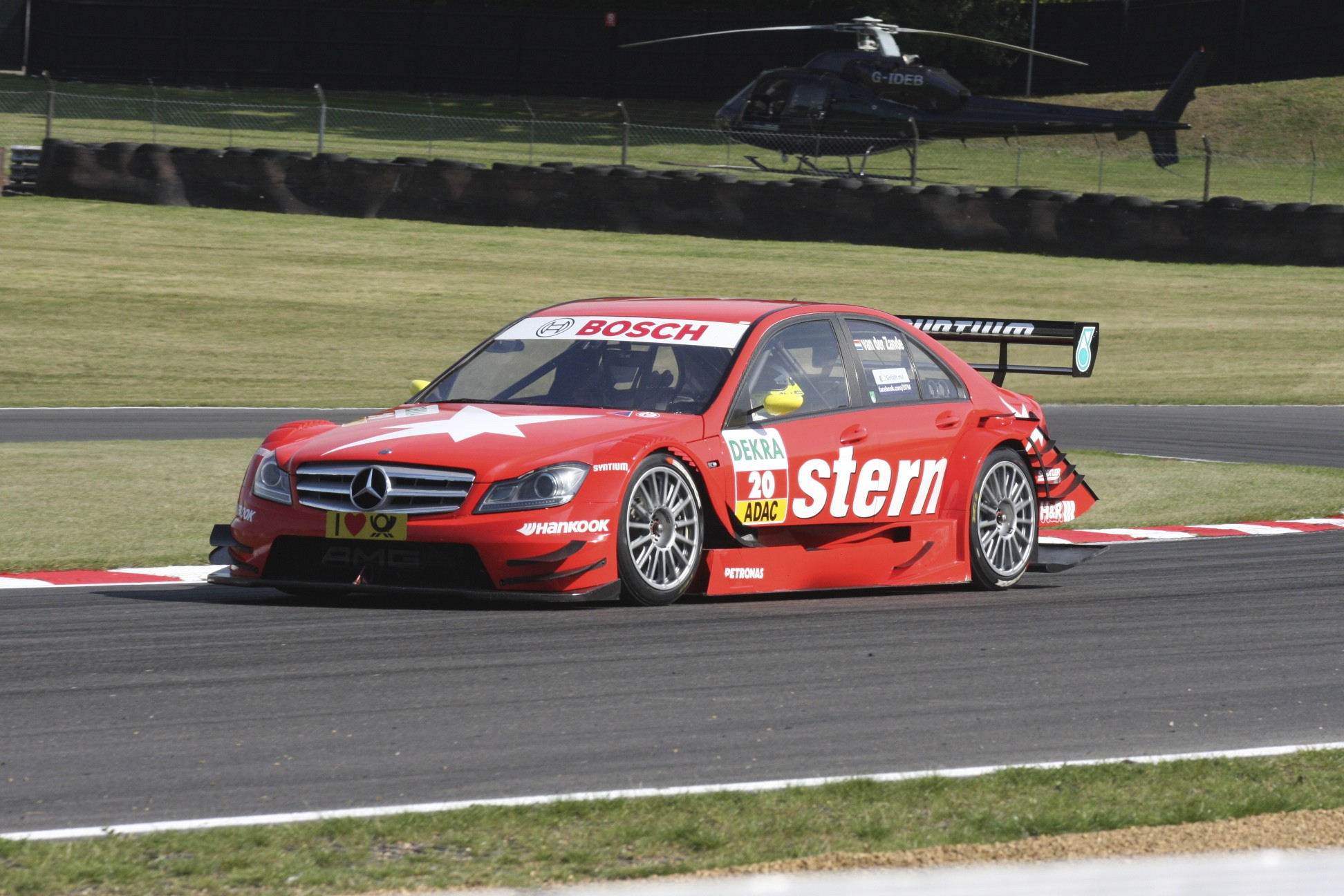
Van der Zande driving at Brands Hatch during the 2011 Deutsche Tourenwagen Masters season.

From GP3, van der Zande advanced to the Deutsche Tourenwagen Masters in 2011 with Persson Motorsport, earning a third-place finish at the Munich Olympic Stadium event. From there, he continued his journey in sports cars for 2012, joining Konrad Motorsport for the first two rounds of the Porsche Supercup at Bahrain. That year, he also joined the Lotus LMP2 team in the FIAWEC for two rounds, qualifying fifth at the 6 Hours of Spa-Francorchamps.

The 2013 was a busy one for van der Zande. He competed in six races in the American Le Mans Series LMPC class with Mishumotors, earning one pole position and one podium. He also competed in the 16 race BRL-V6 season with Teunissen Racing, winning the championship with six race wins and four pole positions. He also competed in select events in the International GT Open with Seyffarth Motorsport in the Mercedes SLS AMG, earning two wins, one pole, and three podiums. That year, he also raced in the Macau GT Cup with Erebus Motorsport, getting as high as third before contact ended his run early.

Van der Zande expanded his racing career to America for the 2014 TUDOR United Sportscar Championship race season, joining Starworks Motorsports with Mirco Schultis. The duo earned wins at Mazda Raceway Laguna Seca, Road America, and Petit Le Mans, and earned an additional four podiums. In Europe, he finished first at the 12 Hours of Zandvoort with Car Collection in the Mercedes-Benz SLS, and also competed GT Masters Nürburgring for HTP Motorsport, and the Macau GT Cup with AMG Driving Academy.

For 2015, van der Zande returned to American sports car racing with Starworks Motorsports and co-driver Mirco Scultis in the IMSA PC class. The duo finished 5th in the TUDOR United Sportscar Championship PC class after winning at Detroit and Watkins Glen. He also joined EFFORT Racing for the Pirelli World Challenge Grand Prix of Sonoma, filling in for full-time driver Ryan Dalziel. Van der Zande earned the Race 1 pole position and earned the win in Race 2. Near the end of the season, van der Zande participated in the 24H Barcelona Trofeu Fermi Vélez, earning the pole position in the #5 Car Collection Motorsport Mercedes-Benz SLS AMG.

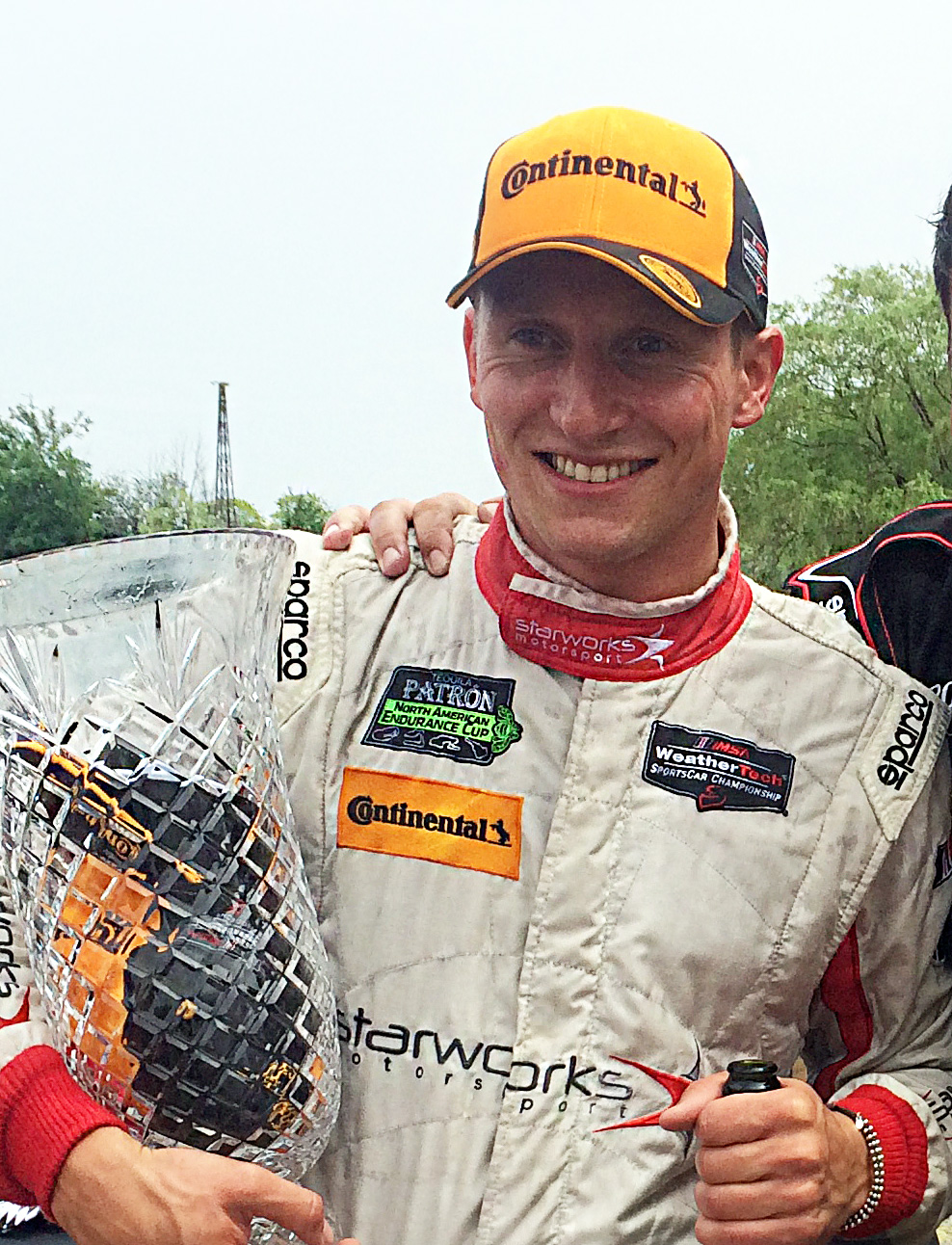
Van der Zande at the Detroit Grand Prix in 2016.

In 2016, van der Zande joined forces with Starworks Motorsport for a third year, racing with co-driver Alex Popow. After winning Detroit, Watkins Glen, Lime Rock Park and Austin, the pair earned the IMSA WeatherTech SportsCar Championship PC class championship in the final race of the season at Petit Le Mans. He also competed in the Blancpain GT Series, finishing second at Spa-Franchorchamps, and also second at the Nürburgring 24 Hour.

In November 2016, it was announced van der Zande would advance to the IMSA WeatherTech SportsCar Championship Prototype class for 2017 with Visit Florida Racing, and with Marc Goossens as his co-driver.

For the 2019 edition of the 24 Hours of Daytona, van der Zande teamed up with Jordan Taylor, Fernando Alonso and Kamui Kobayashi.

In 2020, van der Zande stayed with Wayne Taylor Racing for a third full season in the team's No. 10 car. He won Petit Le Mans with the team after two leaders took each other out in the closing minutes of the race. After being told by the team in August he would be retained for a fourth season, van der Zande was informed by the team of his release on October 21.

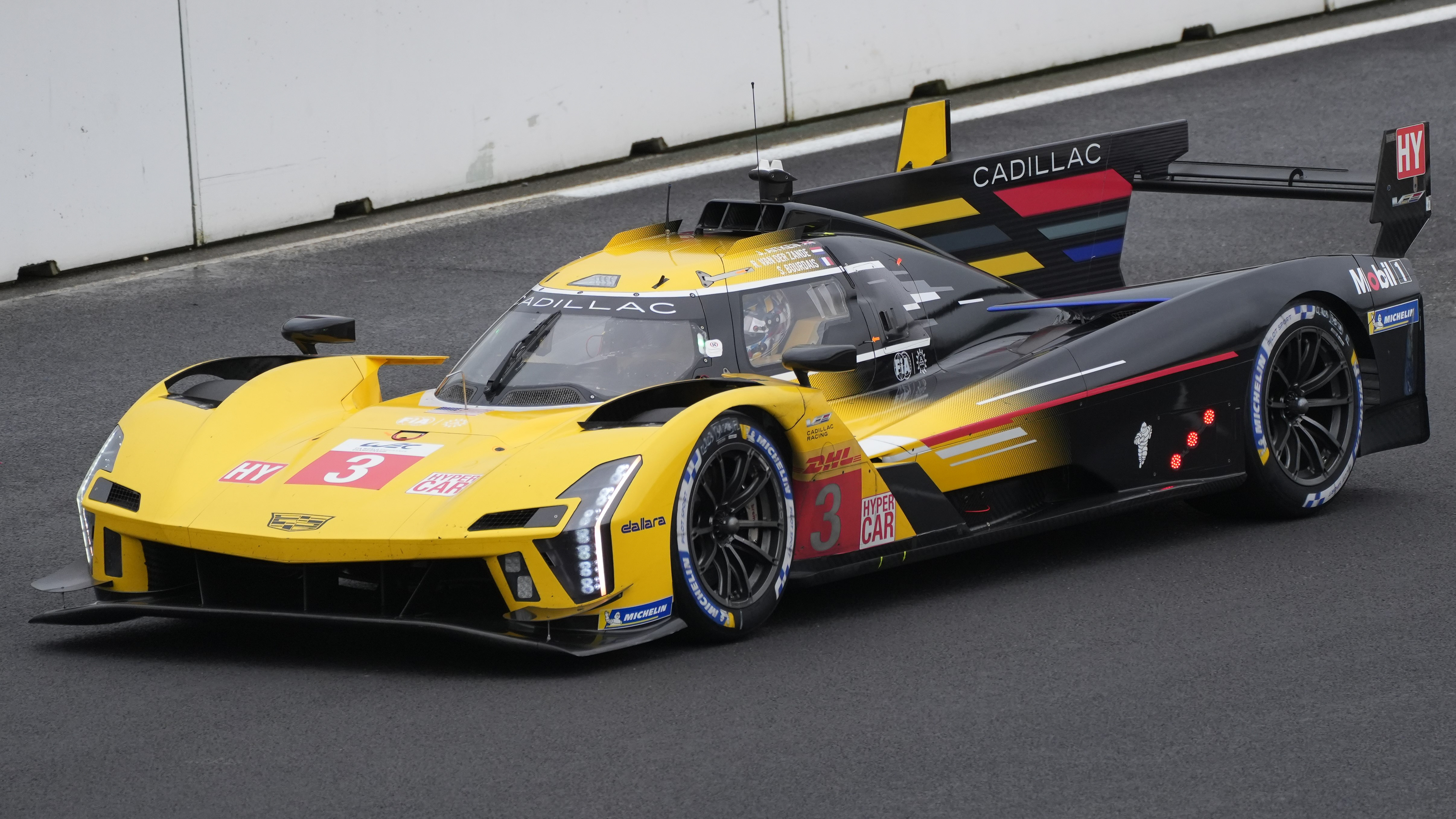
Van der Zande competing at the 2023 6 Hours of Spa-Francorchamps.

In 2021, van der Zande raced in the Chip Ganassi Racing Cadillac DPi-V.R alongside Kevin Magnussen, finishing fourth in the standings. He paired this with a campaign in the 2021 World Endurance Championship LMP2 Class with Inter Europol Competition alongside Alex Brundle and Jakub Śmiechowski. With a best finish of third in class at the 2021 24 Hours of Le Mans, he finished seventh in the standings.

== Racing record ==
=== Career summary ===
Season	Series	Team	Races	Wins	Poles	F/Laps	Podiums	Points	Position
2004	Formula Renault 2.0 Netherlands	Van Amersfoort Racing	?	?	?	?	?	103	7th
2004	Formula Renault 2.0 Germany	Van Amersfoort Racing	4	0	0	0	0	24	26th
2005	Formula Renault 2.0 Netherlands	Van Amersfoort Racing	12	4	4	5	9	203	**1st**
2005	Formula Renault 2.0 Germany	Van Amersfoort Racing	14	4	3	2	5	228	5th
2005	Formula Renault 2.0 Nordic Series	Van Amersfoort Racing	2	0	0	?	2	31	9th
2006	German Formula 3 Championship	SMS Seyffarth Motorsport	20	0	1	0	8	89	4th
2006–07	A1 Grand Prix	A1 Team Netherlands	3	0	0	0	0	57‡	5th‡
2007	Formula 3 Euro Series	Prema Powerteam	20	1	0	0	2	21	11th
2007	Masters of Formula 3	Prema Powerteam	1	0	0	0	0	N/A	9th
2007	Macau Grand Prix	Prema Powerteam	1	0	0	0	0	N/A	17th
2008	Formula 3 Euro Series	Prema Powerteam	20	2	0	0	5	47	4th
2008	Masters of Formula 3	Prema Powerteam	1	0	0	0	0	N/A	NC
2008	Macau Grand Prix	Prema Powerteam	1	0	0	0	0	N/A	5th
2008–09	GP2 Asia Series	Arden Motorsport	1	0	0	0	0	0	31st
2009	British Formula 3 International Series	Hitech Racing	16	3	5	7	9	178	**3rd**
2009	Masters of Formula 3	Hitech Racing	1	0	0	0	0	N/A	6th
2009	Formula 3 Euro Series	Motopark Academy	8	1	0	0	1	7	15th
2009	Macau Grand Prix	Räikkönen Robertson Racing	1	0	0	0	0	N/A	7th
2009	Porsche Supercup	Federsand-Jetstream Motorsport	1	0	0	0	0	9	17th
2010	GP3 Series	RSC Mücke Motorsport	16	0	0	0	1	6	21st
2010	Formula 3 Euro Series	Motopark Academy	2	0	0	0	0	N/A	NC†
2010	Macau Grand Prix	Motopark Academy	1	0	0	0	0	N/A	5th
2010	Supercar Challenge - BRL V6	BRL Association	2	0	0	0	1	16	12th
2011	Deutsche Tourenwagen Masters	Persson Motorsport	10	0	0	0	0	0	17th
2012	FIA World Endurance Championship - LMP2	Lotus	1	0	0	0	0	0	NC
2012	Porsche Supercup	Konrad Motorsport	2	0	0	0	0	14	19th
2013	BRL V6	Teunissen Racing	16	6	2	?	13	298	**1st**
2013	American Le Mans Series - PC	DragonSpeed	6	0	1	0	1	46	13th
2013	International GT Open - GTS	Seyffarth Motorsport	8	2	1	0	3	28	12th
2013	Macau GT Cup	Erebus Motorsport	1	0	0	0	0	N/A	20th
2014	United SportsCar Championship - PC	Starworks Motorsport	10	3	0	1	7	282	**2nd**
2014	ADAC GT Masters	HTP Motorsport	2	0	0	0	1	21	30th
2014	Macau GT Cup	Mercedes-AMG Driving Academy	1	0	0	1	1	N/A	**2nd**
2015	United SportsCar Championship - PC	Starworks Motorsport	10	2	0	3	4	268	5th
2015	ADAC GT Masters	Car Collection Motorsport	2	0	0	0	0	0	NC
2015	Blancpain Endurance Series - Pro-Am	Car Collection Motorsport	1	0	0	0	0	0	NC
2015	24H Series - A6-Pro	Car Collection Motorsport	1	0	1	0	0	0	NC
2015	VLN Series - SP9	Rowe Racing	3	0	0	0	1	0	NC
2015	24 Hours of Nürburgring - SP9	Rowe Racing	1	0	0	0	0	N/A	DNF
2015	Pirelli World Challenge - GT	EFFORT Racing	2	1	1	1	2	266	33rd
2015	FIA GT World Cup	Mercedes AMG Driving Academy	1	0	0	0	0	N/A	4th
2016	IMSA SportsCar Championship - PC	Starworks Motorsport	11	4	1	4	8	355	**1st**
2016	Intercontinental GT Challenge	Mishumotors	1	0	0	0	0	25	6th
2016	Intercontinental GT Challenge	AMG - Team AKKA ASP	1	1	0	0	1	25	6th
2016	24H Series - A6 Pro	GDL Racing	1	0	0	0	0	0	NC
2016	NASCAR Whelen Euro Series - Elite 1	Alex Caffi Motorsports	2	0	0	0	0	158	27th
2016	Blancpain GT Series Endurance Cup	AMG - Team AKKA ASP	2	0	0	0	1	18	22nd
2016	VLN Series - SP9	AMG-Team HTP Motorsport	3	0	0	0	0	0	NC
2016	24 Hours of Nürburgring - SP9	AMG-Team HTP Motorsport	1	0	0	0	1	N/A	**2nd**
2016	24H Series - 991	HRT Performance							
2016	FIA GT World Cup	Mercedes-AMG Driving Academy	1	0	0	0	0	N/A	6th
2017	IMSA SportsCar Championship - Prototype	VisitFlorida Racing	9	1	0	0	2	233	7th
2017	VLN Series - SP9	Haribo Racing Team Mercedes-AMG	2	0	0	0	0	0	NC
2017	24 Hours of Nürburgring - SP9	Haribo Racing Team Mercedes-AMG	1	0	0	0	0	N/A	9th
2017	ADAC GT Masters	Callaway Competition	4	1	0	0	1	37	20th
2017	Blancpain GT Series Endurance Cup	AKKA ASP	1	0	0	0	0	15	21st
2017	Blancpain GT Series Endurance Cup	Black Falcon	1	0	0	0	0	15	21st
2017	Blancpain GT Series Endurance Cup	GRT Grasser Racing Team	1	0	0	0	0	15	21st
2017	FIA GT World Cup	Honda Racing	1	0	0	0	0	N/A	DNF
2018	IMSA SportsCar Championship - Prototype	Wayne Taylor Racing	10	1	2	0	4	270	**3rd**
2018	Blancpain GT Series Endurance Cup	Mercedes-AMG Team Mann Filter	1	0	0	0	0	0	NC
2018	24 Hours of Nürburgring - SP9	Mercedes-AMG Team Mann Filter	1	0	0	0	0	N/A	16th
2018	VLN Series - SP9	Mercedes-AMG Team HTP	2	0	0	1	1	7.75	48th
2018	24 Hours of Le Mans	DragonSpeed	1	0	0	0	0	N/A	DNF
2018–19	FIA World Endurance Championship	DragonSpeed	5	0	0	0	0	8.5	28th
2019	European Le Mans Series - LMP2	DragonSpeed	1	0	0	0	0	1	33rd
2019	24 Hours of Le Mans - LMP1	DragonSpeed	1	0	0	0	0	N/A	DNF
2019	IMSA SportsCar Championship - DPi	Konica Minolta Cadillac	10	1	0	0	3	274	4th
2019	Blancpain GT Series Endurance Cup	Honda Team Motul	1	0	0	0	0	11	20th
2019	Intercontinental GT Challenge	Honda Team Motul	2	0	1	0	0	10	25th
2019	Blancpain GT World Challenge America	Squadra Corse	2	0	0	0	0	0	NC†
2019	24 Hours of Nürburgring - SP9	GetSpeed Performance	1	0	0	0	0	N/A	DNF
2020	IMSA SportsCar Championship - DPi	Konica Minolta Cadillac DPi-V.R	9	2	0	2	5	264	**2nd**
2020	24 Hours of Le Mans - LMP2	DragonSpeed USA	1	0	0	0	0	N/A	11th
2020	GT World Challenge Europe Endurance Cup	Team Honda Racing	1	0	0	0	0	5	26th
2020	Intercontinental GT Challenge	Team Honda Racing	4	0	1	0	1	31	5th
2021	FIA World Endurance Championship - LMP2	Inter Europol Competition	5	0	0	0	1	69	7th
2021	IMSA SportsCar Championship - DPi	Cadillac Chip Ganassi Racing	11	1	1	4	5	3163	4th
2022	IMSA SportsCar Championship - DPi	Cadillac Racing	11	3	4	2	2	3220	**3rd**
2022	FIA World Endurance Championship - LMP2	Vector Sport	2	0	0	0	0	5	22nd
2022	24 Hours of Le Mans - GTE Am	JMW Motorsport	1	0	0	0	0	N/A	15th
2023	IMSA SportsCar Championship - GTP	Cadillac Racing	9	1	0	2	3	2673	7th
2023	24 Hours of Le Mans - Hypercar	Cadillac Racing	1	0	0	0	0	N/A	4th
2023	24 Hours of Nürburgring - SP9	Scherer Sport PHX	1	0	0	0	0	N/A	DNF
2024	IMSA SportsCar Championship - GTP	Cadillac Racing	9	2	2	2	5	2864	**3rd**
2024	IMSA SportsCar Championship - LMP2	Tower Motorsports	1	0	0	0	0	273	46th
2025	IMSA SportsCar Championship - GTP	Acura Meyer Shank Racing w/Curb-Agajanian	9	1	3	1	3	2657	5th
2025	IMSA SportsCar Championship - LMP2	Tower Motorsports	1	0	0	1	0	240	54th
2025	International GT Open	GetSpeed Performance	1	0	0	0	0	0	NC†
2025	24 Hours of Le Mans - LMP2	United Autosports	1	0	0	0	0	N/A	7th
2026	IMSA SportsCar Championship - GTP	Acura Meyer Shank Racing w/ Curb-Agajanian	9	1	3	1	2	2723	**3rd**
2026	24 Hours of Nürburgring - SP-X	HWA Engineering Speed	1	0	0	0	1	N/A	**2nd**
2026	24 Hours of Le Mans - LMP2 Pro-Am	DKR Engineering	1	0	0	0	0	N/A	9th

‡ Team standings.
† – Guest driver; ineligible for championship points *Season is still in progress

=== Complete A1 Grand Prix results ===
(key) (Races in bold indicate pole position) (Races in italics indicate fastest lap)

Year	Entrant	1	2	3	4	5	6	7	8	9	10	11	12	13	14	15	16	17	18	19	20	21	22	DC	Points	Ref
2006–07	Netherlands	NED; SPR	NED; FEA	CZE; SPR	CZE; FEA	CHN; SPR	CHN; FEA	MYS; SPR	MYS; FEA	IDN; SPR	IDN; FEA	NZL; SPR	NZL; FEA	AUS; SPR	AUS; FEA	RSA; SPR	RSA; FEA	MEX; SPR; 9	MEX; FEA	CHN; SPR; 9	CHN; FEA; 4	GBR; SPR	GBR; SPR	5th	57	

=== Complete Formula 3 Euro Series results ===
(key)

Year	Team	1	2	3	4	5	6	7	8	9	10	11	12	13	14	15	16	17	18	19	20	Pos	Points	Ref
2007	Prema Powerteam	HOC; 1; 4	HOC; 2; 21	BRH; 1; 13	BRH; 2; 19†	NOR; 1; 15†	NOR; 2 Ret	MAG; 1; 12	MAG; 2; 8	MUG; 1; 8	MUG; 2; 3	ZAN; 1; 9	ZAN; 2; 5	NÜR; 1; 19	NÜR; 2; 8	CAT; 1; 6	CAT; 2; 1	NOG; 1; 16	NOG; 2; 14	HOC; 1 Ret	HOC; 2; 11	11th	21	
2008	Prema Powerteam	HOC; 1; 8	HOC; 2; 1	MUG; 1; 5	MUG; 2; 20	PAU; 1; 8	PAU; 2; 2	NOR; 1; 10	NOR; 2; 5	ZAN; 1; 7	ZAN; 2; 1	NÜR; 1; 5	NÜR; 2 Ret	BRH; 1; 6	BRH; 2; 3	CAT; 1; 24	CAT; 2; 10	LMS; 1; 18	LMS; 2; 25	HOC; 1; 2	HOC; 2; 5	4th	46	
2009	Motopark Academy	HOC; 1	HOC; 2	LAU; 1	LAU; 2	NOR; 1	NOR; 2	ZAN; 1	ZAN; 2	OSC; 1 DSQ	OSC; 2; 13	NÜR; 1	NÜR; 2	BRH; 1	BRH; 2	CAT; 1; 8	CAT; 2; 1	DIJ; 1 Ret	DIJ; 2; 13	HOC; 1 Ret	HOC; 2; 16†	15th	7	
2010	Motopark Academy	LEC; 1	LEC; 2	HOC; 1	HOC; 2	VAL; 1	VAL; 2	NOR; 1	NOR; 2	NÜR; 1	NÜR; 2	ZAN; 1	ZAN; 2	BRH; 1	BRH; 2	OSC; 1; 14	OSC; 2; 5	HOC; 1	HOC; 2			NC^{†}	N/A	

^{†} Guest driver; ineligible for points

=== Complete GP3 Series results ===
(key) (Races in bold indicate pole position) (Races in italics indicate fastest lap)

Year	Entrant	1	2	3	4	5	6	7	8	9	10	11	12	13	14	15	16	DC	Points
2010	RSC Mücke Motorsport	CAT; FEA; 15	CAT; SPR; 24	IST; FEA; Ret	IST; SPR; Ret	VAL; FEA; Ret	VAL; SPR; 24	SIL; FEA; 11	SIL; SPR; 7	HOC; FEA; 3	HOC; SPR; Ret	HUN; FEA; 9	HUN; SPR; Ret	SPA; FEA; Ret	SPA; SPR; Ret	MNZ; FEA; Ret	MNZ; SPR; Ret	21st	6

=== Complete Deutsche Tourenwagen Masters results ===
(key) (Races in bold indicate pole position) (Races in italics indicate fastest lap)

Year	Team	Car	1	2	3	4	5	6	7	8	9	10	Pos.	Pts
2011	Persson Motorsport	AMG-Mercedes C-Klasse 2008	HOC; 18	ZAN; 13	SPL; 10	LAU; 14	NOR; 10	NÜR; 11	BRH; 15	OSC; Ret	VAL; DSQ	HOC; 12	17th	0

=== Complete Porsche Supercup results ===
(key) (Races in bold indicate pole position) (Races in italics indicate fastest lap)

Year	Team	1	2	3	4	5	6	7	8	9	10	11	12	13	DC	Points
2009	Federsand-Jetstream Motorsport	BHR	BHR	CAT	MON	IST	SIL; 9	NÜR	HUN	ESP	SPA	MNZ	YMC	YMC	17th	9
2012	Konrad Motorsport	BHR; 11	BHR; 7	MON	VAL	SIL	GER	HUN	HUN	SPA	MNZ				19th	14

=== Complete FIA World Endurance Championship results ===
(key) (Races in bold indicate pole position; races in italics indicate fastest lap)

Year	Entrant	Class	Chassis	Engine	1	2	3	4	5	6	7	8	Pos.	Points
2012	Lotus	LMP2	Lola B12/80	Lotus (Judd) 3.6 V8	SEB	SPA; Ret	LMS	SIL	SÃO	BHR	FUJ	SHA	NC	0
2018–19	DragonSpeed	LMP1	BR Engineering BR1	Gibson GL458 4.5 V8	SPA	LMS; Ret	SIL; 25	FUJ	SHA; 6	SEB; Ret	SPA	LMS; Ret	28th	8.5
2021	Inter Europol Competition	LMP2	Oreca 07	Gibson GK428 4.2 L V8	SPA; 5	ALG	MNZ; 4	LMS; 3	BHR; 9	BHR; 5			7th	69
2022	Vector Sport	LMP2	Oreca 07	Gibson GK428 4.2 L V8	SEB	SPA	LMS	MNZ	FUJ; 9	BHR; 9			22nd	5

=== American Le Mans Series results ===
(key) (Races in bold indicate pole position) (Races in italics indicate fastest lap)

Year	Entrant	Class	Make	Engine	1	2	3	4	5	6	7	8	9	10	Pos.	Pts	Ref
2013	DragonSpeed	PC	Oreca FLM09	Chevrolet LS3 6.2 V8	SEB	LBH	LAG; 5	LIM; 5	MOS; 2	ROA; 6	BAL	**COA**; 5	VIR; 6	PET	13th	46	

=== Complete IMSA SportsCar Championship results ===
(key) (Races in bold indicate pole position) (Races in italics indicate fastest lap)

Year	Entrant	No.	Class	Make	Engine	1	2	3	4	5	6	7	8	9	10	11	Pos.	Points	Ref
2014	Starworks Motorsport	8	PC	Oreca FLM09	Chevrolet LS3 6.2 L V8	DAY; 5	SEB; 3	LGA; 1	KAN; 2	WGL; 7	IMS; 10	ELK; 1	VIR; 6	COA; 3	PET; 1		2nd	282	
2015	Starworks Motorsport	8	PC	Oreca FLM09	Chevrolet LS3 6.2 L V8	DAY; 6	SEB; 5	LGA; 6	DET; 1	WGL; 1	MOS; 6	LIM; 3	ELK; 6	COA; 6	PET; 2		5th	268	
2016	Starworks Motorsport	8	PC	Oreca FLM09	Chevrolet LS3 6.2 L V8	DAY; 4	SEB; 3	LBH; 2	LGA; 2	DET; 1	**WGL**; 1	MOS; 2	LIM; 1	ELK; 6	COA; 1	PET; 6	1st	355	
2017	VisitFlorida Racing	90	P	Riley Mk. 30	Gibson GK428 4.2 V8	DAY; 3	SEB; 6	LBH; WD	COA; 7	DET; 9	WGL; 5	MOS; 10					7th	233	
2017	VisitFlorida Racing	90	P	Ligier JS P217	Gibson GK428 4.2 V8								ELK; 5	LGA; 1	PET; 7		7th	233	
2018	Wayne Taylor Racing	10	P	Cadillac DPi-V.R	Cadillac 5.5 L V8	**DAY**; 15	SEB; 2	LBH; 3	MDO; 5	DET; 5	WGL; 5	MOS; 2	ELK; 4	LGA; 12	PET; 1		3rd	270	
2019	Konica Minolta Cadillac	10	DPi	Cadillac DPi-V.R	Cadillac 5.5 L V8	DAY; 1	SEB; 2	LBH; 10	MDO; 6	DET; 9	WGL; 4	MOS; 6	ELK; 5	LGA; 4	PET; 2		4th	274	
2020	Konica Minolta Cadillac	10	DPi	Cadillac DPi-V.R	Cadillac 5.5 L V8	DAY; 1	DAY; 6	SEB; 2	ELK; 2	ATL; 5	MOH; 3	PET; 1	LGA; 6	SEB; 7			2nd	264	
2021	Cadillac Chip Ganassi Racing	01	DPi	Cadillac DPi-V.R	Cadillac 5.5 L V8	DAY; 5	SEB; 5	MDO; 5	**DET**; 1	WGL; 6	WGL; 2	ELK; 3	LGA; 2	LBH; 2	PET; 5		4th	3163	
2022	Cadillac Racing	01	DPi	Cadillac DPi-V.R	Cadillac 5.5 L V8	DAY; 7	**SEB**; 7	**LBH**; 1	LGA; 6	**MDO**; 5	**DET**; 1	WGL; 3	MOS; 1	ELK; 3	PET; 4		3rd	3220	
2023	Cadillac Racing	01	GTP	Cadillac V-Series.R	Cadillac LMC55R 5. 5 L V8	DAY; 3	SEB; 7	LBH; 8	LGA; 1	WGL; 5	MOS; 9	ELK; 4	IMS; 7	PET; 2			7th	2673	
2024	Cadillac Racing	01	GTP	Cadillac V-Series.R	Cadillac LMC55R 5. 5 L V8	DAY; 10	SEB; 2	LBH; 1	**LGA**; 5	DET; 3	WGL; 2		ELK; 9	**IMS**; 6	PET; 1		3rd	2864	
2024	Tower Motorsports	8	LMP2	Oreca 07	Gibson GK428 V8							MOS; 6					46th	273	
2025	Acura Meyer Shank Racing w/ Curb-Agajanian	93	GTP	Acura ARX-06	Acura AR24e 2.4 L turbo V6	DAY; 8	SEB; 3	LBH; 11	LGA; 5	**DET**; 1	**WGL**; 6		**ELK**; 3	IMS; 5	PET; 7		5th	2657	
2025	Tower Motorsports	8	LMP2	Oreca 07	Gibson GK428 V8							MOS; 9					54th	240	
2026	Acura Meyer Shank Racing w/ Curb-Agajanian	93	GTP	Acura ARX-06	Acura AR24e 2.4 L Turbo V6	**DAY**; 5	SEB; 6	**LBH**; 1	LGA; 5	DET; 4	WGL; 2	**ELK**; 4	IMS; 7	PET; 10			3rd	2723	

^{*} Season still in progress.

=== Complete 24 Hours of Le Mans results ===
Year	Team	Co-Drivers	Car	Class	Laps	Pos.	Class Pos.
2018	(United States) DragonSpeed	(United Kingdom) Ben Hanley (Sweden) Henrik Hedman	BR Engineering BR1-Gibson	LMP1	244	DNF	DNF
2019	(United States) DragonSpeed	(United Kingdom) Ben Hanley (Sweden) Henrik Hedman	BR Engineering BR1-Gibson	LMP1	76	DNF	DNF
2020	(United States) DragonSpeed USA	(United Kingdom) Ben Hanley (Sweden) Henrik Hedman	Oreca 07-Gibson	LMP2	361	16th	12th
2021	(Poland) Inter Europol Competition	(Poland) Jakub Śmiechowski (United Kingdom) Alex Brundle	Oreca 07-Gibson	LMP2	360	10th	5th
2022	(United Kingdom) JMW Motorsport	(United States) Jason Hart (United States) Mark Kvamme	Ferrari 488 GTE Evo	GTE; Am	331	50th	15th
2023	(United States) Cadillac Racing	(France) Sébastien Bourdais (New Zealand) Scott Dixon	Cadillac V-Series.R	Hypercar	340	4th	4th
2024	(United States) Cadillac Racing	(France) Sébastien Bourdais (New Zealand) Scott Dixon	Cadillac V-Series.R	Hypercar	223	DNF	DNF
2025	(United Kingdom) United Autosports	(Brazil) Pietro Fittipaldi (Denmark) David Heinemeier Hansson	Oreca 07-Gibson	LMP2	364	24th	7th
2026	(Luxembourg) DKR Engineering	(Mexico) Sebastián Álvarez (Canada) John Farano	Oreca 07-Gibson	LMP2	344	31st	17th
2026	(Luxembourg) DKR Engineering	(Mexico) Sebastián Álvarez (Canada) John Farano	Oreca 07-Gibson	LMP2 Pro-Am	344	31st	9th

=== Complete European Le Mans Series results ===
(key) (Races in bold indicate pole position; results in italics indicate fastest lap)

Year	Entrant	Class	Chassis	Engine	1	2	3	4	5	6	Rank	Points
2019	DragonSpeed	LMP2	Oreca 07	Gibson GK428 4.2 L V8	LEC	MNZ; 10	CAT	SIL	SPA	ALG	33rd	1

=== Complete NASCAR results ===
==== Whelen Euro Series – Elite 1 ====
NASCAR Whelen Euro Series – Elite 1 results
Year	Team	No.	Make	1	2	3	4	5	6	7	8	9	10	11	12	NWES	Pts
2016	Alex Caffi Motorsport	33	Chevy	VAL	VAL	VEN	VEN	BRH	BRH	TOU	TOU	ADR	ADR	ZOL; 5	ZOL; 4	27th	158

Sporting positions
Preceded by Junior Strous	Dutch Formula Renault; Champion; 2005	Succeeded by Filipe Albuquerque (NEC)
Preceded by Jon Bennett; Colin Braun	IMSA SportsCar Championship; PC Champion; 2016; With: Alex Popow	Succeeded by Patricio O'Ward; James French
Preceded by Felipe Nasr; Pipo Derani; Eric Curran	Michelin Endurance Cup; Champion; 2020; With: Ryan Briscoe	Succeeded by Filipe Albuquerque; Ricky Taylor; Alexander Rossi
