= Cornelis Taats =

Dutch mayor

Cornelis Taats (Dodewaard, 31 October 1790 – 25 January 1864) was mayor of Dodewaard from 1827 until his death in 1864.

Taats had the Den Esch house built on Kerkstraat in 1840. This building now has the status of a national monument. In 1844 he bought the Huis te Andelst, which he had demolished two years later. His parents were Gerrit Jacob Taats and Geertruid Scheers.
