= Hien, Netherlands =

Hien
- Hamlet and neighbourhood
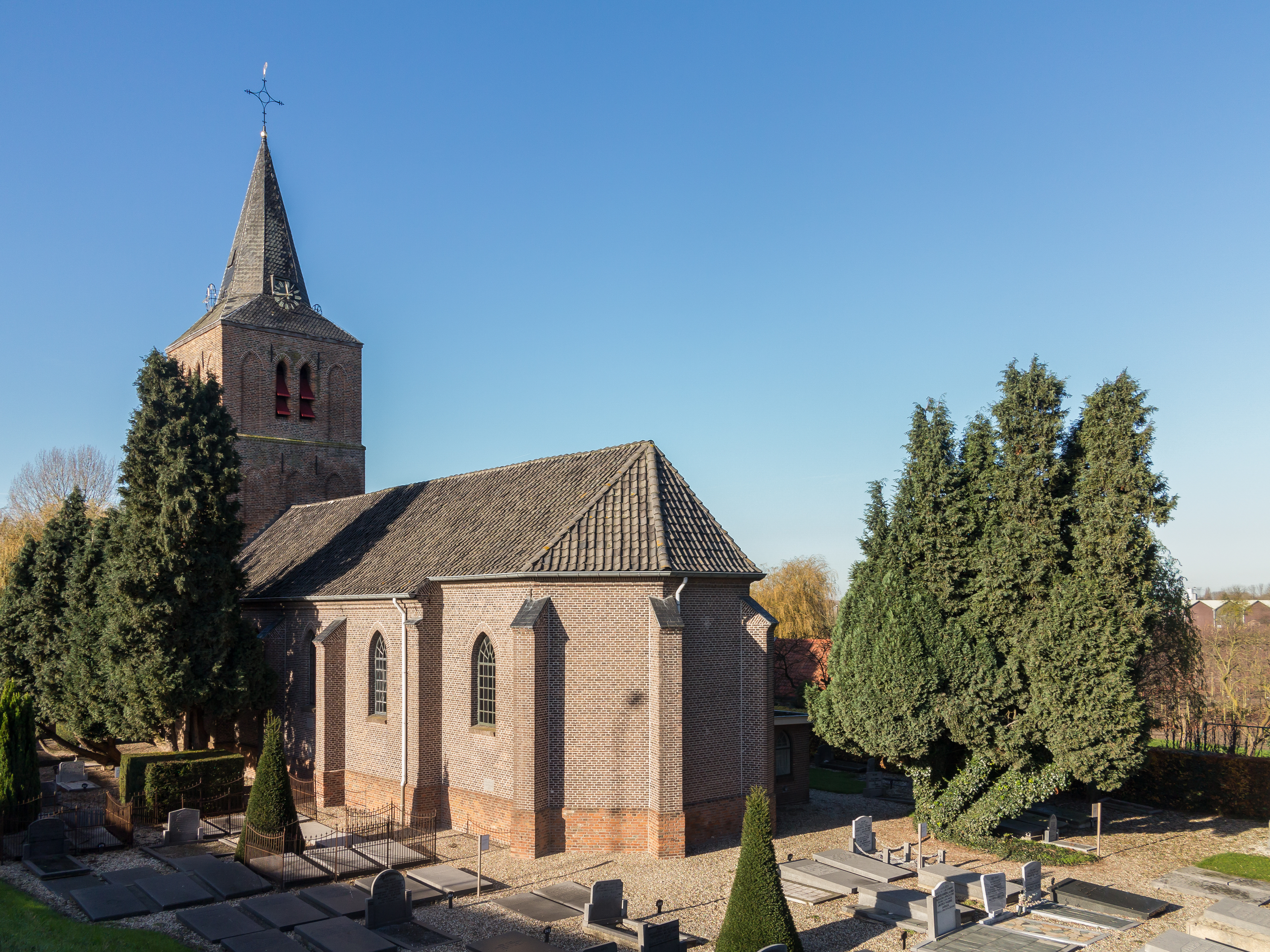
- Church of Hien

- Location in the Netherlands Hien (Netherlands)
- Coordinates: 51.90816°N 5.66616°E
- Country: Netherlands
- Province: Gelderland
- Municipality: Montferland

Area
  - Total: 1.86 km^{2} (0.72 sq mi)
- Elevation: 8 m (26 ft)

Population (2021)
  - Total: 3,310
  - Density: 1,780/km^{2} (4,610/sq mi)
- Time zone: UTC+1 (CET)
  - Summer (DST): UTC+2 (CEST)
- Postal code: 6669
- Dialing code: 0488

Hien is a neighbourhood of Dodewaard and a hamlet in the Dutch province of Gelderland. It is located in the municipality of Neder-Betuwe, about 1 km east of Dodewaard.

It was first mentioned in the late 9th century as Hehun. The etymology is unclear. Around 1300, Hien becomes an independent parish. The tower of church burned down in 1641 and was replaced in 1787. In 1842, the church was demolished and replaced by a new church. In 1840, it was home to 637 people. It grew into a single urban area with Dodewaard and most of the original village including the church has been annexed. There are about a dozen houses in the hamlet left.

== Gallery ==
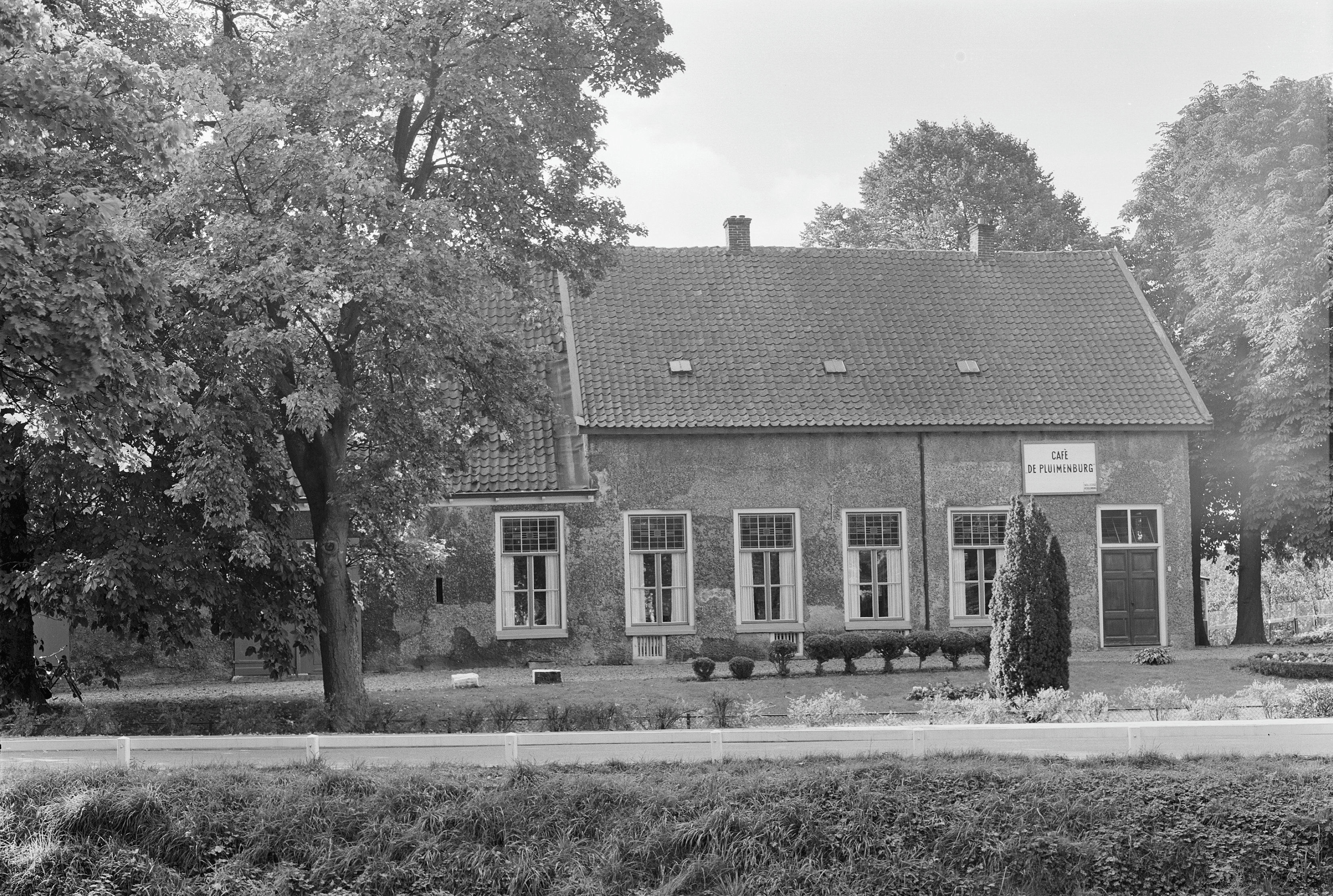
Farm at Hien

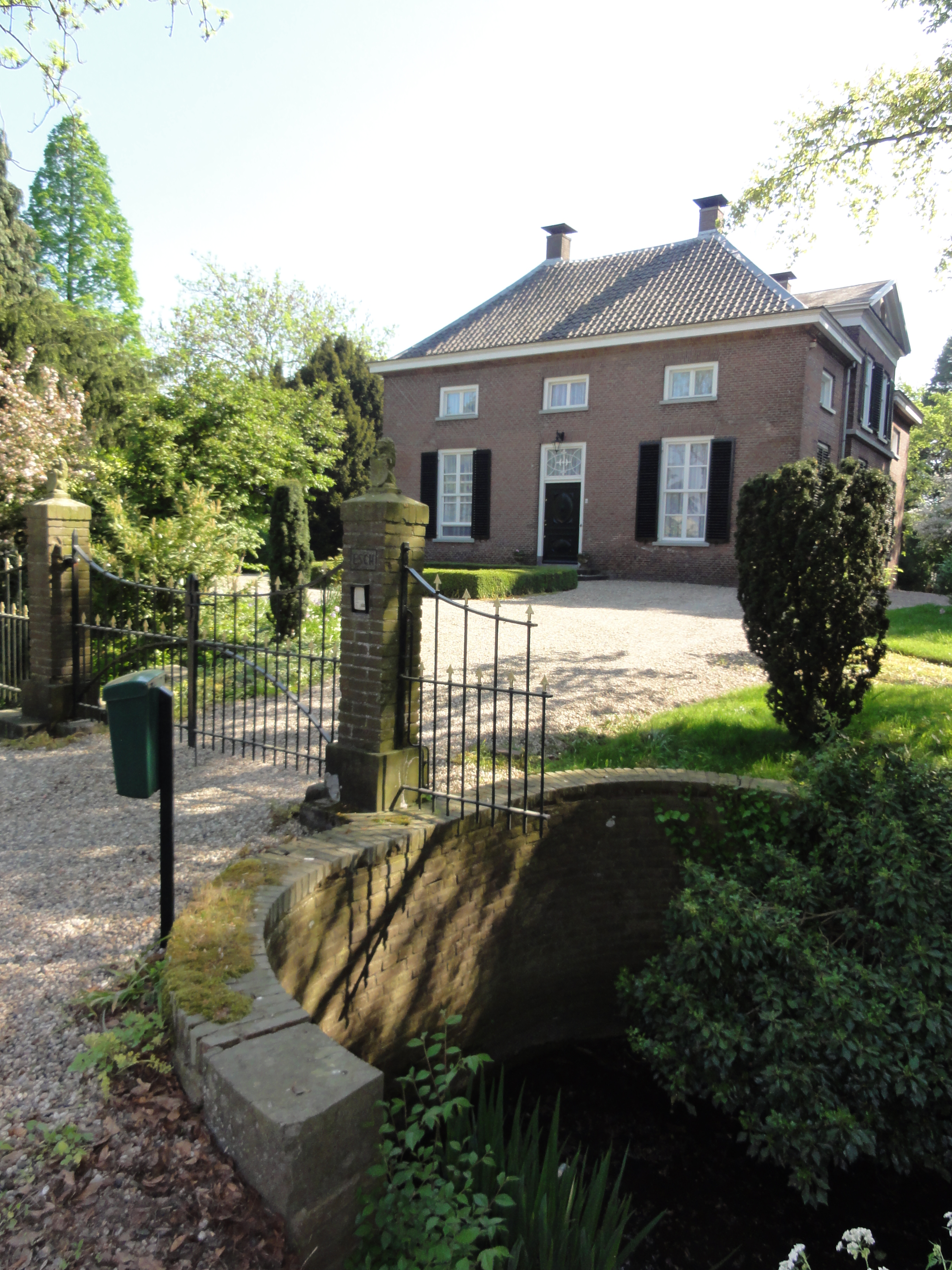
Villa at Hien

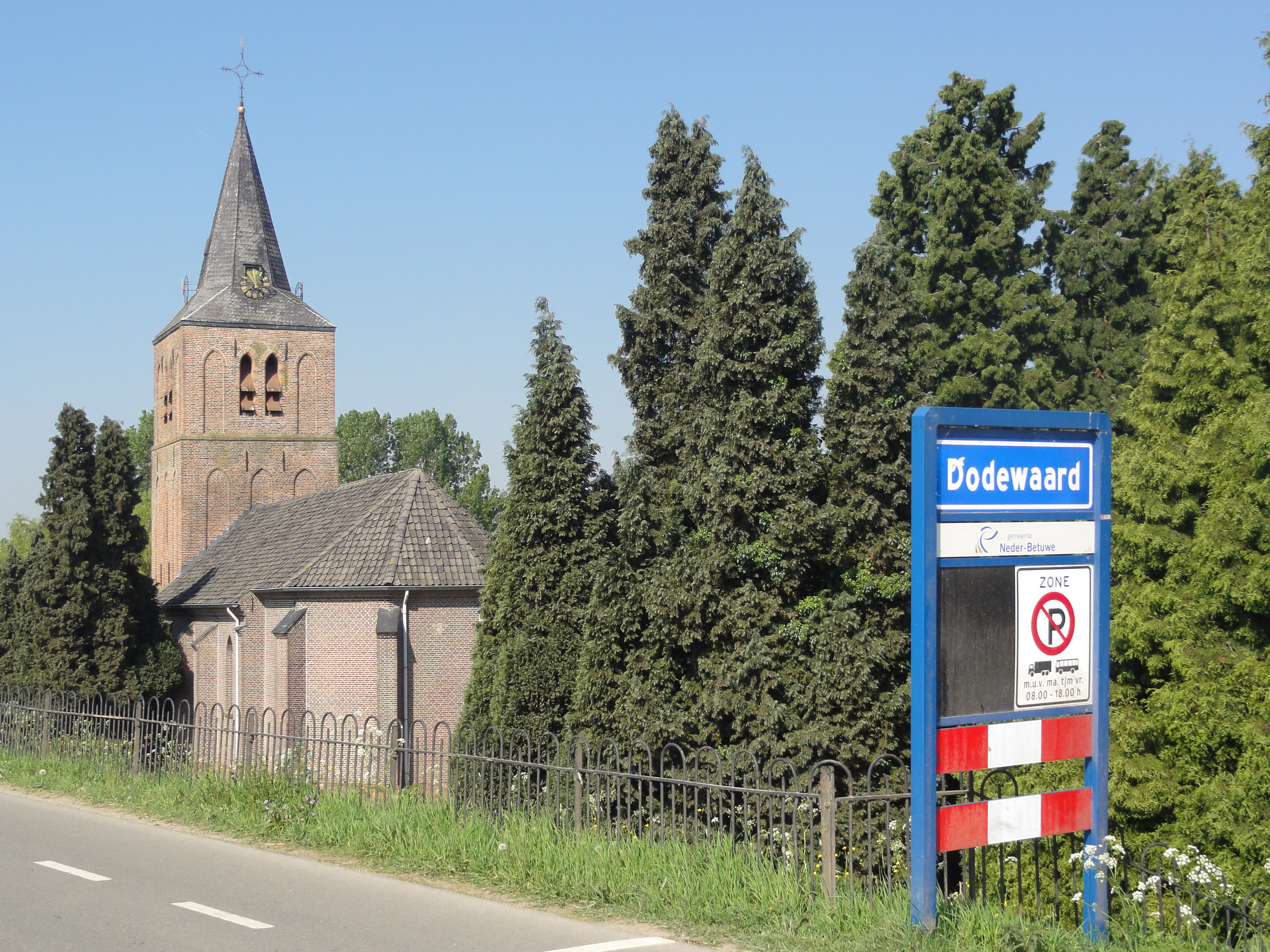
Place name sign of Dodewaard in front of the church of Hien
