= Dodewaard =

- Village
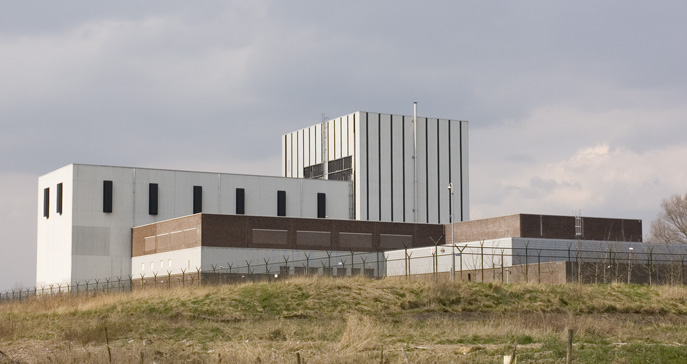
- Remainder of the nuclear power plant

- Flag Coat of arms

- Location in the Netherlands Dodewaard (Netherlands)
- Coordinates: 51°55′N 5°39′E
- Country: Netherlands
- Province: Gelderland
- Municipality: Neder-Betuwe

Area
  - Total: 19.32 km^{2} (7.46 sq mi)
- Elevation: 8 m (26 ft)

Population (2021)
  - Total: 4,465
  - Density: 231.1/km^{2} (598.6/sq mi)
- Time zone: UTC+1 (CET)
  - Summer (DST): UTC+2 (CEST)
- Postal code: 6669
- Dialing code: 0488

Dodewaard (Dutch pronunciation: [ˈdoːdəʋaːrt]) is a village in the Dutch province of Gelderland. It is a part of the municipality of Neder-Betuwe, and lies about 7 km south of Wageningen.

Dodewaard extends south from national highway A15(exit 36 Dodewaard-Opheusden) and sits along the river Waal. The town also has its own railway station, Hemmen-Dodewaard, its train services are operated by Arriva in the Tiel-Arnhem Centraal route on the Elst-Dordrecht railway line.

Dodewaard was a separate municipality until 2002, when it became a part of Kesteren. Before 1818, the municipality was called "Hien en Dodewaard".

It also houses the now defunct Dodewaard nuclear power plant.

== History ==
It was first mentioned in the 11th century de Dodeuuero, and means "land near water of Dudo/Dodo (person)". Dodewaard developed along the Waal River as a stretched out settlement. The Dutch Reformed Church dates from around 1100. The tower was enlarged in the 12th and 16th century and replaced between 1840 and 1842. In 1840, it was home to 714 people.

The Dodewaard nuclear power plant was in service from 1969 until 1997. Most of the complex has been demolished, however the core remains and will not be dismantled until 2045 when the radio activity has been substantially reduced.

== Notable people ==
- Renger van der Zande (born 1986), race-car driver
- Cornelis Taats (1790-1864), mayor from 1827-1864.

== Gallery ==
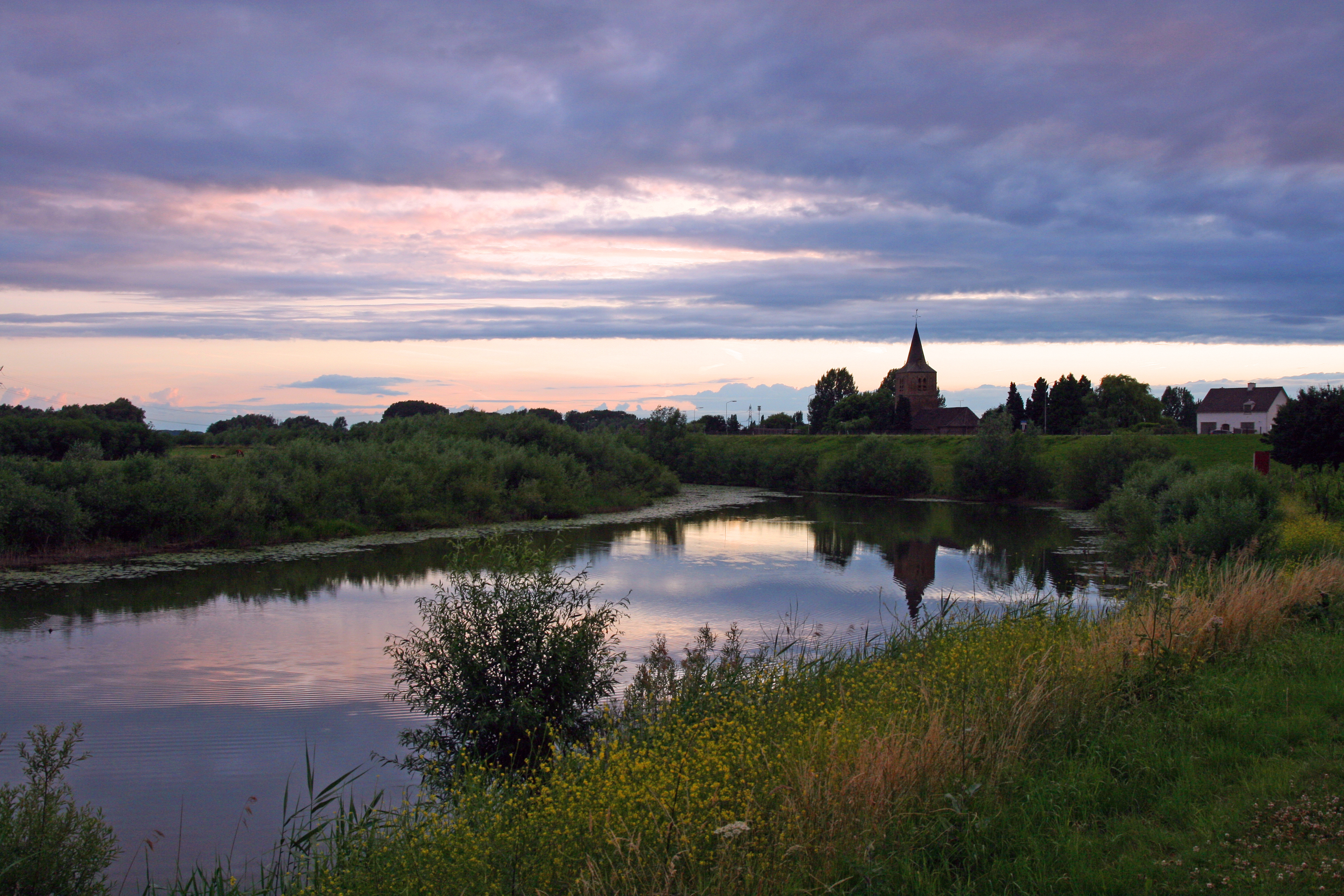
View on Dodewaard

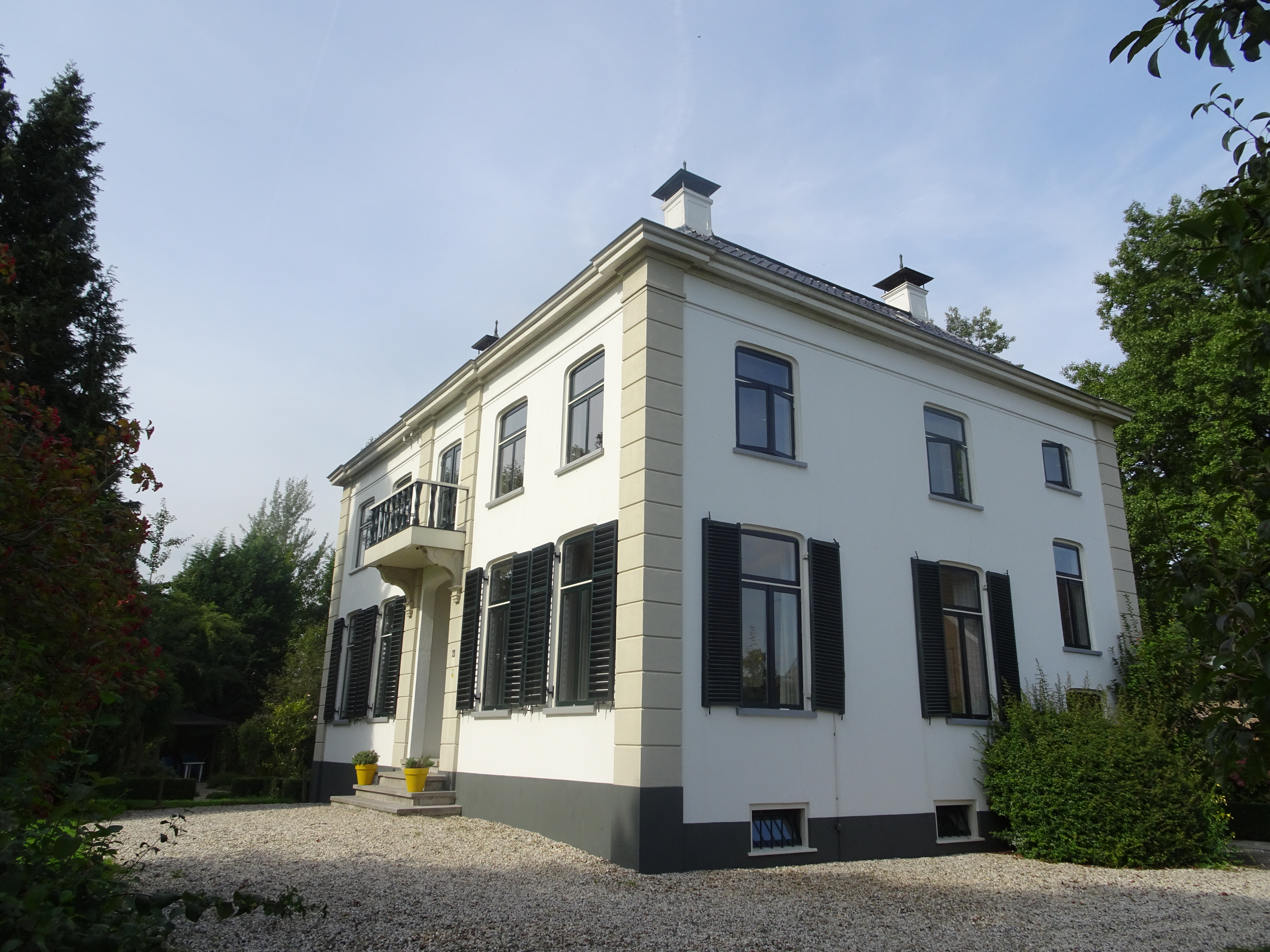
Villa Distelkamp

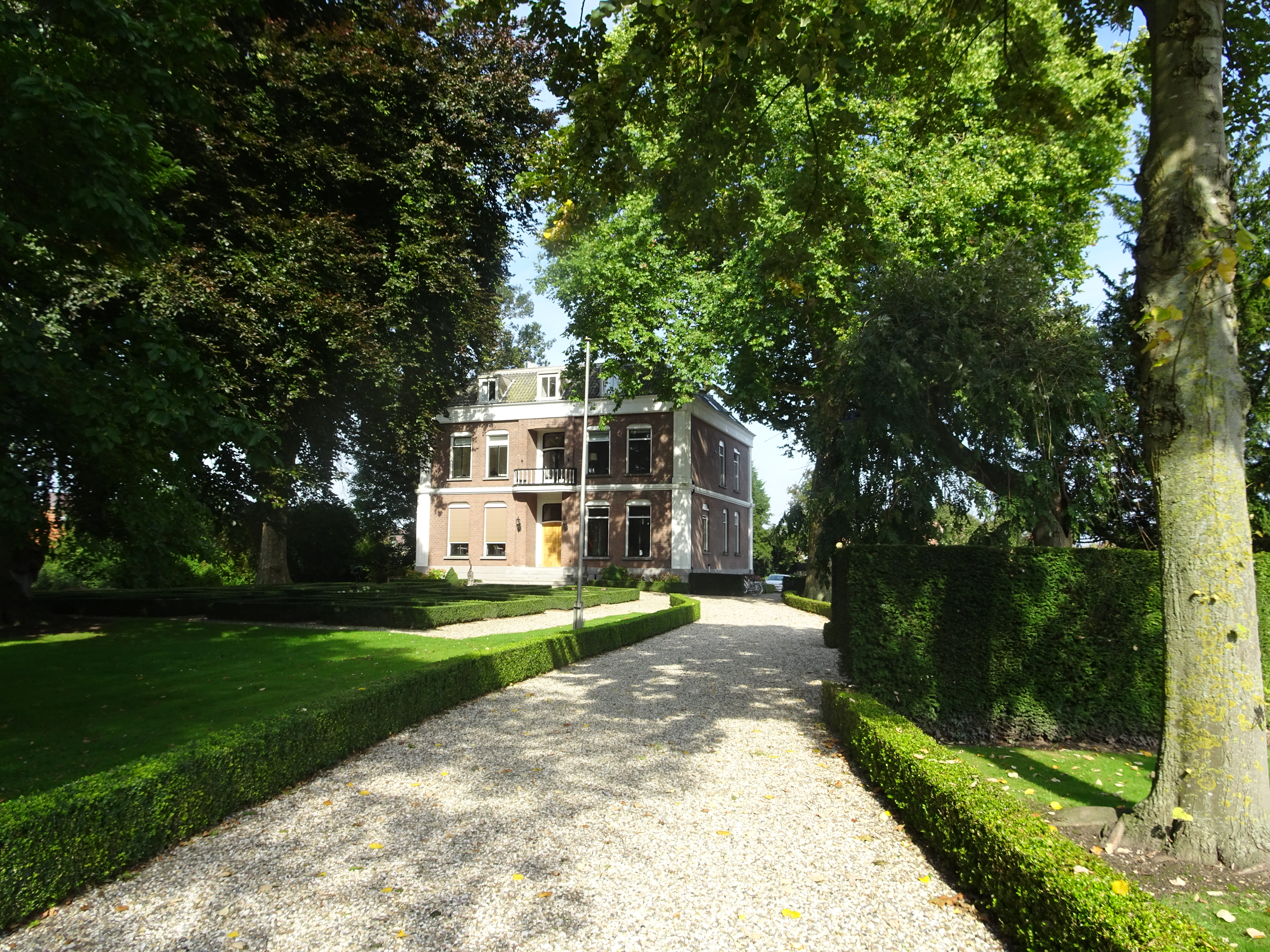
Former town hall

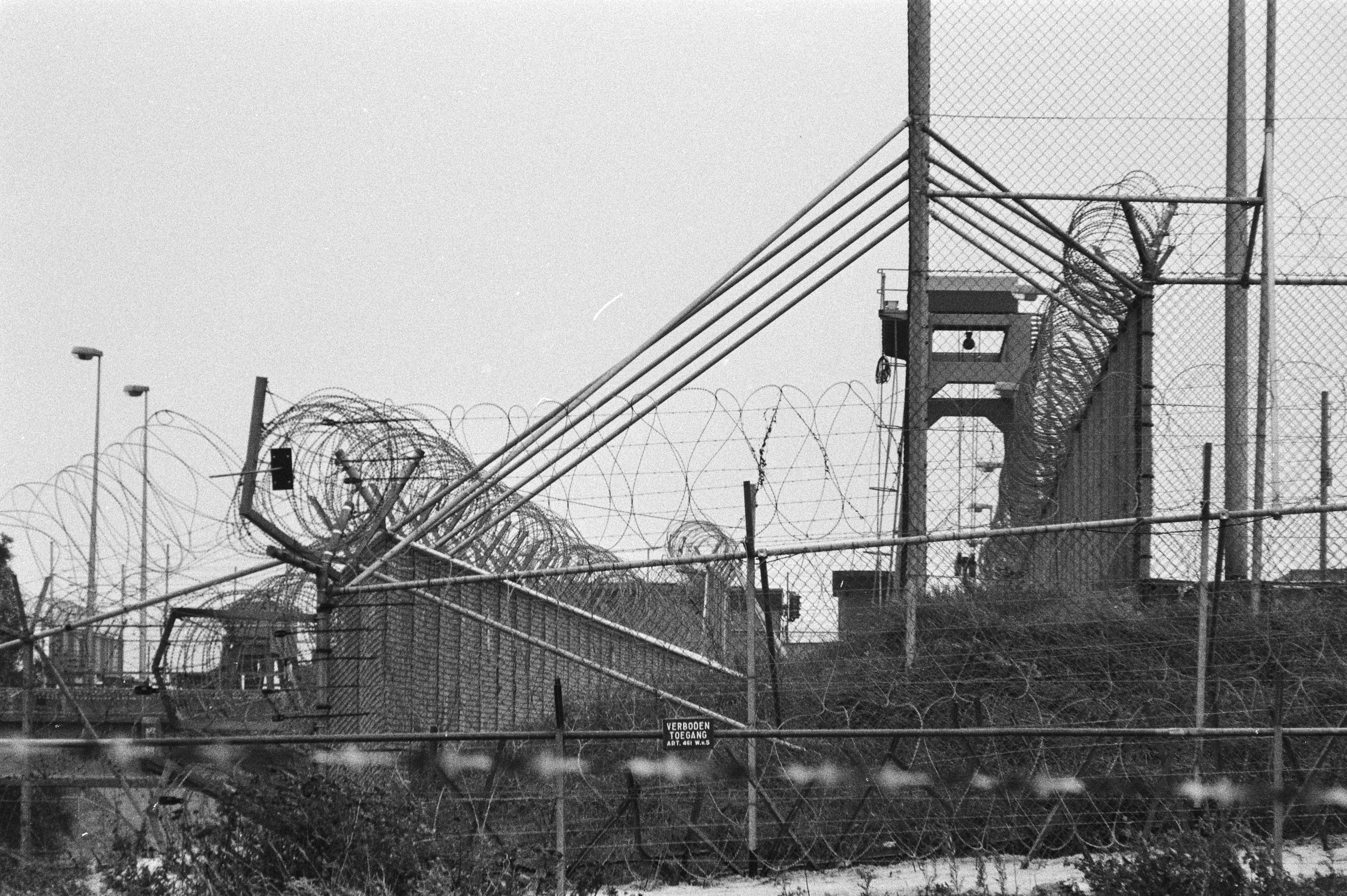
Fence around the nuclear power plant
