= Detroit Grand Prix =

Detroit Grand Prix may refer to:

- Detroit Grand Prix (Formula One)
- Detroit Grand Prix (IndyCar)
